= National Register of Historic Places listings in Steuben County, Indiana =

Location of Steuben County in Indiana

This is a list of the National Register of Historic Places listings in Steuben County, Indiana.

This is intended to be a complete list of the properties and districts on the National Register of Historic Places in Steuben County, Indiana, United States. Latitude and longitude coordinates are provided for many National Register properties and districts; these locations may be seen together in a map.

There are 17 properties and districts listed on the National Register in the county.

Properties and districts located in incorporated areas display the name of the municipality, while properties and districts in unincorporated areas display the name of their civil township. Properties and districts split between multiple jurisdictions display the names of all jurisdictions.

This National Park Service list is complete through NPS recent listings posted February 27, 2026.

== Current listings ==
	Name on the Register	Image	Date listed	Location	City or town	Description
1	Angola Commercial Historic District	Angola Commercial Historic District	December 27, 2010 (#10001073)	Roughly bounded by Superior, Gale, Gilmore, and Martha Sts. 41°38′05″N 85°00′01″W	Angola	
2	Cyrus and Jennie Cline House	Cyrus and Jennie Cline House	September 18, 2017 (#100001615)	313 E. Maumee St. 41°38′06″N 84°59′46″W	Angola	
3	Collins School	Collins School	October 16, 2002 (#02001173)	State Road 120, 0.7 miles east of County Road 450W, and west of Fremont; 41°44′38″N 85°03′47″W	Jamestown Township	
4	Combination Shelter	Combination Shelter	April 3, 1992 (#92000190)	Pokagon State Park, north of Angola; 41°42′36″N 85°02′06″W	Jamestown Township	
5	Erastus and Louise Farnham House and Barn	Erastus and Louise Farnham House and Barn	May 17, 2022 (#100007739)	205 West Swager Dr. 41°43′24″N 84°56′06″W	Fremont	
6	Fawn River State Fish Hatchery	Fawn River State Fish Hatchery	January 2, 1997 (#96001553)	6889 N. State Road 327; 41°44′30″N 85°10′22″W	Millgrove Township and Orland	
7	Fox Lake	Fox Lake	April 12, 2001 (#01000360)	60-760 Lane 130, southwest of Angola; also bounded by W. Fox Lake Road on the south, S. West Fox Lake Road on the west, Lane 250 Fox Lake on the north, and the east shore of Fox Lake on the east 41°37′26″N 85°01′30″W	Pleasant Township	A boundary increase was approved March 2, 2026.
8	Lime Lake - Lake Gage Channel and Bridge		September 6, 2019 (#100004361)	North Gage Drive; 41°42′32″N 85°06′53″W	Angola	
9	Free Church	Free Church	March 24, 1983 (#83000149)	Old State Road 1 N., east of Angola; 41°38′07″N 84°50′17″W	York Township	
10	Cornish Griffin Round Barn	Cornish Griffin Round Barn	April 2, 1993 (#93000187)	2015 SW. Fox Lake Rd., north of Pleasant Lake; 41°36′45″N 85°02′07″W	Steuben Township	
11	William L. Lords House	William L. Lords House	June 16, 1983 (#83000114)	Clear Lake Rd., northeast of Fremont; 41°45′12″N 84°51′05″W	Clear Lake Township	
12	Enos Michael House	Enos Michael House	February 19, 1982 (#82000075)	200 E. Toledo St. 41°43′50″N 84°55′53″W	Fremont	
13	Pleasant Lake Depot	Pleasant Lake Depot	December 7, 2001 (#01001344)	1469 W. Main St. at Pleasant Lake; 41°34′28″N 85°01′03″W	Steuben Township	
14	Pokagon State Park	Pokagon State Park	January 11, 1996 (#95001540)	5 miles north of Angola, west of U.S. Route 27; 41°43′04″N 85°01′11″W	Jamestown and Pleasant Townships	
15	Pryor's Country Place		November 13, 2024 (#100011038)	1540 West Fox Lake Road; 41°37′22″N 85°01′08″W	Angola	
16	Steuben County Courthouse	Steuben County Courthouse	May 12, 1975 (#75000051)	Public Square; 41°38′03″N 84°59′56″W	Angola	
17	Steuben County Jail	Steuben County Jail	April 2, 1976 (#76000035)	201 S. Wayne; 41°38′02″N 84°59′56″W	Angola	

== See also ==
- List of National Historic Landmarks in Indiana
- National Register of Historic Places listings in Indiana
- Listings in neighboring counties: Branch (MI), DeKalb, Hillsdale (MI), LaGrange, Noble, Williams (OH)
- List of Indiana state historical markers in Steuben County
