= Jamestown (disambiguation) =

Jamestown was the first permanent English settlement in what is now the United States.

Jamestown may also refer to:

== Places ==
=== Canada ===
- Jamestown, Newfoundland and Labrador
- Jamestown, Ontario, in Huron County
- Jamestown, Toronto, a neighbourhood within Smithfield in Toronto, Ontario
- St. James Town, a neighbourhood in Toronto, Ontario

=== Ireland ===
- Jamestown, Churchtown, a townland in Churchtown civil parish, barony of Rathconrath, County Westmeath
- Jamestown, Conry, a townland in Conry civil parish, barony of Rathconrath, County Westmeath
- Jamestown, County Laois
- Jamestown, County Leitrim

=== United Kingdom ===
- Jamestown, Easter Ross, Scotland
- Jamestown, West Dunbartonshire, Scotland
- Jamestown, Fife, Scotland

=== United States ===
- Jamestown, California
- Jamestown, Colorado
- Jamestown, Georgia
- Jamestown, Indiana, in Boone County
- Jamestown, Elkhart County, Indiana
- Jamestown, Steuben County, Indiana
- Jamestown, Kansas
- Jamestown, Kentucky, in Campbell County (now part of Dayton, Kentucky)
- Jamestown, Kentucky, in Russell County
- Jamestown, Louisiana
- Jamestown, Missouri
- Jamestown, New Mexico
- Jamestown, New York, the largest American city bearing the name
- Jamestown, North Carolina
- Jamestown, North Dakota, the second largest city bearing the name
- Jamestown, Ohio, a village
- Jamestown, Morrow County, Ohio, a ghost town
- Jamestown, Oklahoma
- Jamestown, Pennsylvania
- Jamestown, Rhode Island
- Jamestown Settlement, the living history museum reconstruction of the town
- Jamestown, South Carolina
- Jamestown S'Klallam Indian Reservation, an Indian reservation in Washington
- Jamestown, Tennessee
- Jamestown, Texas, an unincorporated community in Smith County, Texas
- Jamestown, West Virginia
- Jamestown, Wisconsin
- James Town, Wyoming
- Jamestown Charter Township, Michigan
- Jamestown Dam, a dam in North Dakota
- Jamestown Township, Blue Earth County, Minnesota
- Jamestown Township, Steuben County, Indiana
- Historic Jamestowne, the archaeological site of the original town

=== Other places ===
- Jamestown, South Australia, Australia
- Holetown, Saint James, Barbados; sometimes called its founding name, Jamestown
- Jamestown, Ghana, a district of the city of Accra
- Jamestown, an alternate name for Bayan Lepas, Penang, Malaysia
- Jamestown, New Zealand, an abandoned settlement in northern Fiordland
- Jamestown, Saint Helena, a harbour and the capital of Saint Helena
- Jamestown, Saint Kitts and Nevis, the name of a former town on the edge of Morton Bay on Nevis in the late 17th century
- Jamestown, Eastern Cape, South Africa
- Jamestown, Western Cape, South Africa

== Other uses ==
- Jamestown (horse), American Champion racehorse
- Jamestown (ship), a large sailing ship carrying valuable lumber which was abandoned and ran aground off Iceland in 1881
- Jamestown (TV series), a 2017 British television series
- Jamestown (video game), a shoot-'em-up video game set in a steampunk alternate universe in which Jamestown Colony is settled on Mars
- The Indian massacre of 1622, often referred to as the Jamestown Massacre, in the Virginian town of Jamestown
- USS Jamestown, any one of a number of United States Navy vessels
- "Jamestown", a song by The Movielife from the album Forty Hour Train Back to Penn (2003)
- Jamestown Foundation, a Washington, D.C.–based think tank
- Jamestown Revival, a folk, folk rock, and Americana duo from Magnolia, Texas
- Jamestown L.P., American real estate investment and management company based in Atlanta, Georgia
- Jamestown, American Lunar base from the TV Show For All Mankind (TV series)

== See also ==
- Old Jamestown, Missouri
- Jameston, Pembrokeshire
