= List of Indiana state historical markers in Steuben County =

Location of Steuben County in Indiana

This is a list of the Indiana state historical markers in Steuben County.

This is intended to be a complete list of the official state historical markers placed in Steuben County, Indiana, United States, by the Indiana Historical Bureau. The locations of these historical markers, and their latitude and longitude coordinates, are included below when available, along with their names, years of placement, and topics as recorded by the Historical Bureau. There are 3 historical markers located in Steuben County.

== Historical markers ==
Marker title	Image	Year placed	Location	Topics
Fremont Indiana		1976	Northwestern corner of the junction of Toledo (State Road 120 and Wayne (State Road 827) Streets at the site of the old town pump in Fremont; 41°43′51.4″N 84°55′58.6″W	Historic District, Neighborhoods, and Towns, American Indian/Native American
Indiana's Northern Boundary Line		2000	4.7 miles east of Fremont at the junction of State Road 120 and County Road 775E, along the southern shore of Clear Lake; 41°43′35.4″N 84°50′45.6″W	Early Settlement and Exploration, Government Institutions
Fox Lake Resort		2022	Southeast point of Fox Lake, 1429 Fox Lake Rd., Angola; 41°37′21.2″N 85°01′3.1″W	African American; Historic District/Town

== See also ==
- List of Indiana state historical markers
- National Register of Historic Places listings in Steuben County, Indiana
