= Holiday Woods, Indiana =

- Census-designated place
- Location within Indiana Location within the United States
- Coordinates: 41°37′25″N 85°04′20″W
- Country: United States
- State: Indiana
- County: Steuben
- Township: Pleasant

Area
  - Total: 0.23 sq mi (0.60 km^{2})
  - Land: 0.23 sq mi (0.60 km^{2})
  - Water: 0.0 sq mi (0 km^{2})
- Elevation: 988 ft (301 m)
- Time zone: UTC-5 (Eastern (EST))
  - Summer (DST): UTC-4 (EDT)
- ZIP codes: 46703 (Angola)
- Area code: 260
- FIPS code: 18-34284
- GNIS feature ID: 2830543

Holiday Woods is an unincorporated community and census-designated place (CDP) in Steuben County, Indiana, United States.

== Geography ==
The community is in west-central Steuben County, on high ground south of Silver Lake and east of Hogback Lake. It is 4 miles (6 km) west of Angola.

According to the U.S. Census Bureau, the Holiday Woods CDP has an area of 0.24 square miles (0.62 km^{2}), all land.

== Demographics ==
The United States Census Bureau delineated Holiday Woods as a census designated place in the 2022 American Community Survey.
