= Indiana State Road 327 =

Highway in Indiana

State Road 327
- SR 327 highlighted in red

Route information
- Maintained by INDOT
- Length: 31.768 mi (51.126 km)
- Existed: 1931–present

Major junctions
- South end: SR 205 near Garrett
- US 6 in Corunna; US 20 in Flint
- North end: Rierson Road & W 800 N Street at the Michigan state line

Location
- Country: United States
- State: Indiana
- Counties: Dekalb, Steuben

Highway system
- Indiana State Highway System; Interstate; US; State; Scenic
← SR 312	→ SR 329

State Road 327 (SR 327) is a state road in the north-eastern section of the state of Indiana. Running for about 32 miles (51 km) in a general north–south direction, connecting rural portions of DeKalb and Steuben counties. SR 327 was originally introduced in the early 1930s routed between Garrett and Corunna. The road was extended north to the Michigan state line in the mid-1930s. In the late 1960s the road was extended south to the city of Fort Wayne. This extension did not last; by the mid-1970s, the southern end of SR 327 was truncated to its current location at SR 205.

== Route description ==
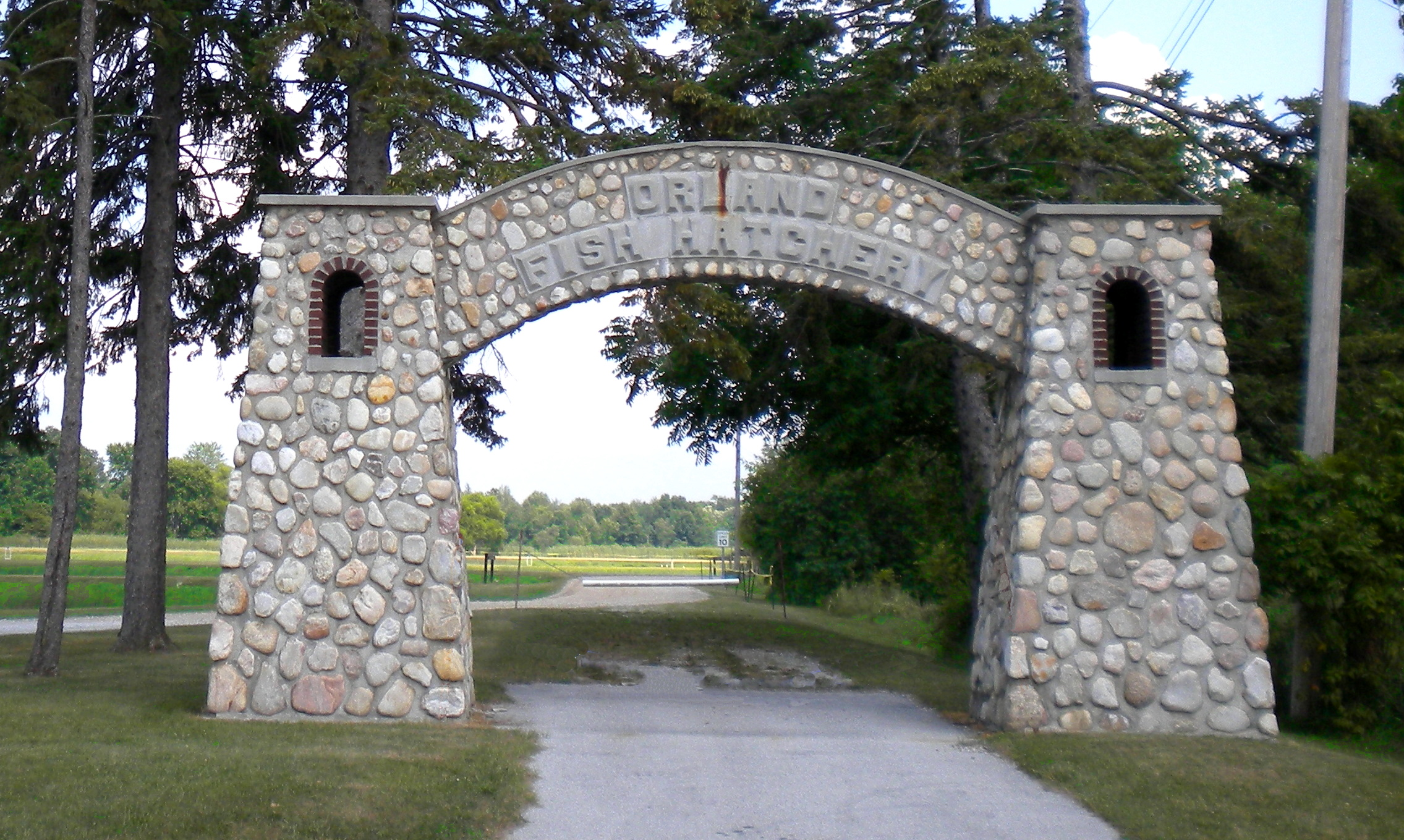
The Fawn River State Fish Hatchery, a mile north of Orland, is on the National Register of Historic Places.

SR 327 starts at an all-way stop with SR 205, and two DeKalb county roads. It heads north as a two-lane highway passing through farmland. The route enters Garrett, concurrent with Randolph Street, and passes through a mix of commercial and residential properties. The highway passes through the Garrett Historic District, a historic district listed on the National Register of Historic Places. While in the historic district the road passes through the central business district before passing under CSX Railroad tracks. North of the railroad tracks the route leaves the historic district, while passes through residential properties. On the north side of Garrett SR 327 has a four-way stop at SR 8 before the road leaves Garrett. North of Garrett the road makes a sharp curve turning due west. The road has a second sharp curve turning back due north and heads towards Corunna. The route enter Corunna from the south and passes through residential properties. The highway passes over the Norfolk Southern Railroad tracks and has an intersection at U.S. Route 6 (US 6).

SR 327 turns west concurrent with US 6 as a two-lane highway, passing through commercial properties. After leaving Corunna, SR 327 turns north leaving US 6 and heads towards Helmer, the landscape becomes farms and fields. South of Helmer the road bends towards the west before curving towards the north and having an intersection with the western terminus of the eastern segment of SR 4. After SR 4 the road enters Helmer and crosses an Indiana Northeastern Railroad track. North of the railroad tracks the road passes through residential properties, before leaving Helmer. Past Helmer the route passes through rural farmland and an intersection at US 20. The highway enters Orland and passes through residential properties with a few commercial properties. After leaving Orland SR 327 passes Fawn River State Fish Hatchery, while passing through agriculture. South of the Michigan state line SR 327 passes under the Indiana Toll Road, before the SR 327 designation ends at the state line. While the SR 327 designation end at the state line the roadway continues north into Michigan as Rierson Road.

No part of SR 327 in Indiana is included in the National Highway System (NHS). The NHS is a network of highways that are identified as being important for the economy, mobility and defense of the nation. The highway is maintained by the Indiana Department of Transportation (INDOT) like all other State Roads in the state. The department tracks the traffic volumes along all state roads as a part of its maintenance responsibilities using a metric called average annual daily traffic (AADT). This measurement is a calculation of the traffic level along a segment of roadway for any average day of the year. Between 2014 and 2015, INDOT figured that lowest traffic levels were 748 vehicles used the highway daily between Indiana Toll Road and Michigan state line. The peak traffic volumes were 7,956 vehicles AADT along the section of SR 327 at its concurrency with US 6.

== History ==
SR 327 had its beginning in 1931 when it was designated from Garrett to Corunna. The route between Corunna and the Michigan state line was authorized in 1934. DeKalb County purchased the right-of-way for the road between Corunna and Helmer in 1935. The state highway commission constructed the section of road, between US 6 and Michigan state line, in 1936. During 1969 SR 327 was extended south to Interstate 69 in Fort Wayne, along former US 27. The entire roadway was paved between 1970 and 1971. The state highway commission truncated SR 327 south of Garrett at an intersection with SR 205 between 1974 and 1975.

== Major intersections ==
County	Location	mi	km	Destinations	Notes
DeKalb	Keyser–Butler township line	0.000	0.000	SR 205 south / CR 56 east / CR 327 south – LaOtto, Churubusco	Southern terminus of SR 327; northern terminus of SR 205
DeKalb	Garrett	3.019	4.859	SR 8 – Avilla, Auburn	
DeKalb	Corunna	8.440	13.583	US 6 east – Butler	Eastern end of US 6 concurrency
DeKalb	Richland Township	8.903	14.328	US 6 west – Kendallville	Western end of US 6 concurrency
DeKalb–Steuben county line	Helmer	15.519	24.975	SR 4 east – Ashley	Western terminus of the eastern section of SR 4
Steuben	Jackson Township	23.757	38.233	US 20 – Lagrange, Angola	
Steuben	Orland	29.731	47.847	SR 120 – Howe, fremont	
Steuben	Millgrove Township	31.768	51.126	Rierson Road; W 800 N Road	Michigan state line
1.000 mi = 1.609 km; 1.000 km = 0.621 mi: Concurrency terminus
