= Jamestown micropolitan area =

The Jamestown micropolitan area may refer to:

- The Jamestown, New York micropolitan area, United States
- The Jamestown, North Dakota micropolitan area, United States

== See also ==
- Jamestown (disambiguation)
