= Angola Commercial Historic District =

Historic district in Indiana, United States

- U.S. National Register of Historic Places
- U.S. Historic district
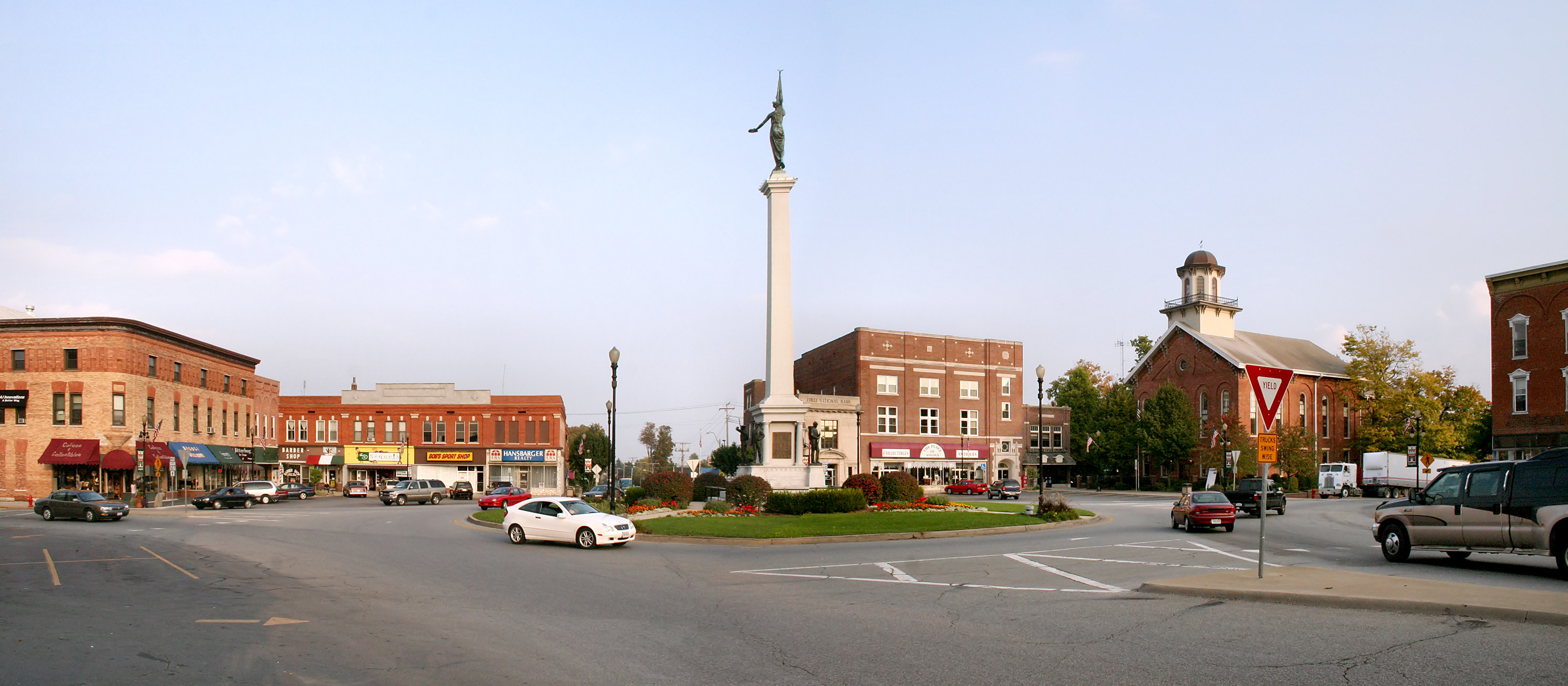
- Angola Commercial Historic District, October 2005

- Location within Indiana Location within the United States
- Location: Roughly bounded by Superior, Gale, Gilmore, and Martha Sts., Angola, Indiana
- Coordinates: 41°38′05″N 85°00′01″W
- Area: 17.56 acres (7.11 ha)
- Built: 1861
- Architect: Multiple
- Architectural style: Late 19th And 20th Century Revivals, Late Victorian, Arts & Crafts
- NRHP reference No.: 10001073
- Added to NRHP: December 27, 2010

Angola Commercial Historic District is a national historic district located at Angola, Indiana. The district encompasses 49 contributing buildings, one contributing site, and two contributing objects in the central business district of Angola. It developed between about 1861 and the 1960, and includes notable examples of Italianate, Romanesque Revival, Beaux-Arts, Classical Revival, Late Gothic Revival, and Art Deco style architecture. Located in the district are the separately listed Steuben County Courthouse and Steuben County Jail. Other notable buildings include the Angola City Hall, Angola Police and Fire Department Building (1939), First Congregational United Church of Christ (1899), United Methodist Church of Angola (1889), Patterson Block (1861), Jackson Block (1870), Croxton Opera House (1892), Angola Masonic Building (1929), Armory Building (1916), and First National Bank (1923).

It was listed on the National Register of Historic Places in 2010.
