= Pleasant Township, Steuben County, Indiana =

Pleasant Township
- Township
- Location in Steuben County
- Coordinates: 41°39′28″N 85°01′35″W
- Country: United States
- State: Indiana
- County: Steuben

Government
  - Type: Indiana township

Area
  - Total: 35.29 sq mi (91.4 km^{2})
  - Land: 32.08 sq mi (83.1 km^{2})
  - Water: 3.21 sq mi (8.3 km^{2}) 9.10%
- Elevation: 1,030 ft (314 m)

Population (2020)
  - Total: 14,424
  - Density: 427.2/sq mi (164.9/km^{2})
- GNIS feature ID: 453749
- Website: pleasanttownshipsteuben.org

Pleasant Township is one of twelve townships in Steuben County, Indiana, United States. As of the 2020 census, its population was 14,424, up from 13,704 at the 2010 census, and it contained 6,970 housing units.

== History ==
Fox Lake and Pokagon State Park are listed on the National Register of Historic Places.

== Geography ==
According to the 2010 census, the township has a total area of 35.29 square miles (91.4 km^{2}), of which 32.08 square miles (83.1 km^{2}) (or 90.90%) is land and 3.21 square miles (8.3 km^{2}) (or 9.10%) is water. Lakes in this township include Booth Lake, Buck Lake, Center Lake, Cheeseboro Lake, Crockett Lake, Crooked Lake, First Basin of Lake James (a.k.a. Lower Basin of Lake James), Fox Lake, Johnson Lake, Lake Charles East, Little Center Lake, Loon Lake, Middle Center Lake, Mud Lake, Second Basin of Lake James (a.k.a. Middle Basin of Lake James), and Silver Lake.

=== Cities and towns ===
- Angola (the county seat)

=== Unincorporated towns ===
- Crooked Lake

(This list is based on USGS data and may include former settlements.)

=== Adjacent townships ===
- Jamestown Township (north)
- Fremont Township (northeast)
- Scott Township (east)
- Otsego Township (southeast)
- Steuben Township (south)
- Salem Township (southwest)
- Jackson Township (west)
- Millgrove Township (northwest)

=== Cemeteries ===
The township contains four cemeteries: Circle Hill, Crockett, Old Circle Hill and Sowles.

=== Major highways ===
- Interstate 69
- U.S. Route 20
- State Road 127
- State Road 827

== Education ==
Pleasant Township residents may obtain a free library card from the Carnegie Public Library of Steuben County.
