= CCC Shelter =

Historic park shelter in Indiana, U.S.

- Combination Shelter
- U.S. National Register of Historic Places
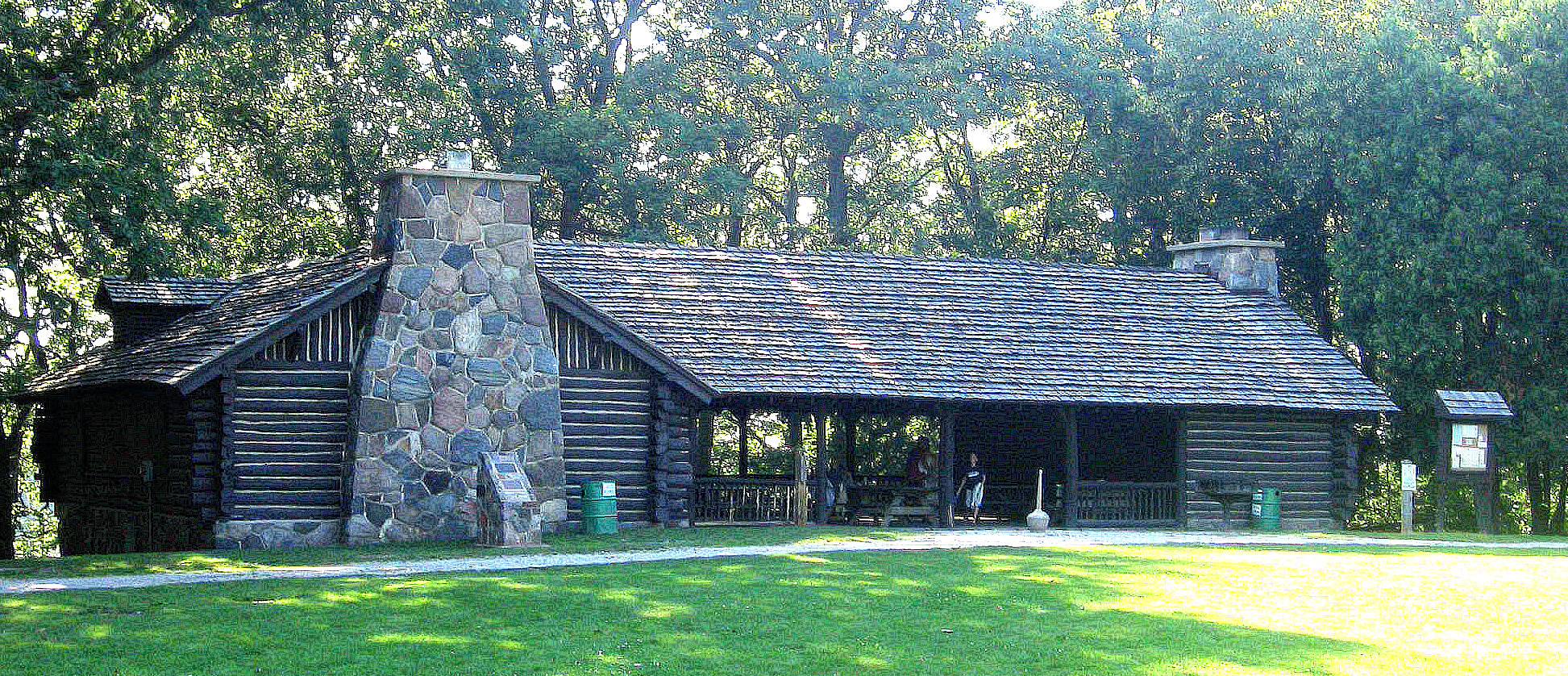
- The CCC Shelter (also known as the Combination Shelter) at Pokagon State Park, built by the Civilian Conservation Corps in 1935/36.

- Location within Indiana
- Location: Pokagon State Park, north of Angola in Jamestown Township, Steuben County, Indiana
- Coordinates: 41°42′35.58″N 85°2′5.65″W
- Area: less than one acre
- Built: 1936
- Built by: Civilian Conservation Corps
- Architectural style: NPS Rustic
- MPS: New Deal Resources in Indiana State Parks MPS
- NRHP reference No.: 92000190
- Added to NRHP: April 3, 1992

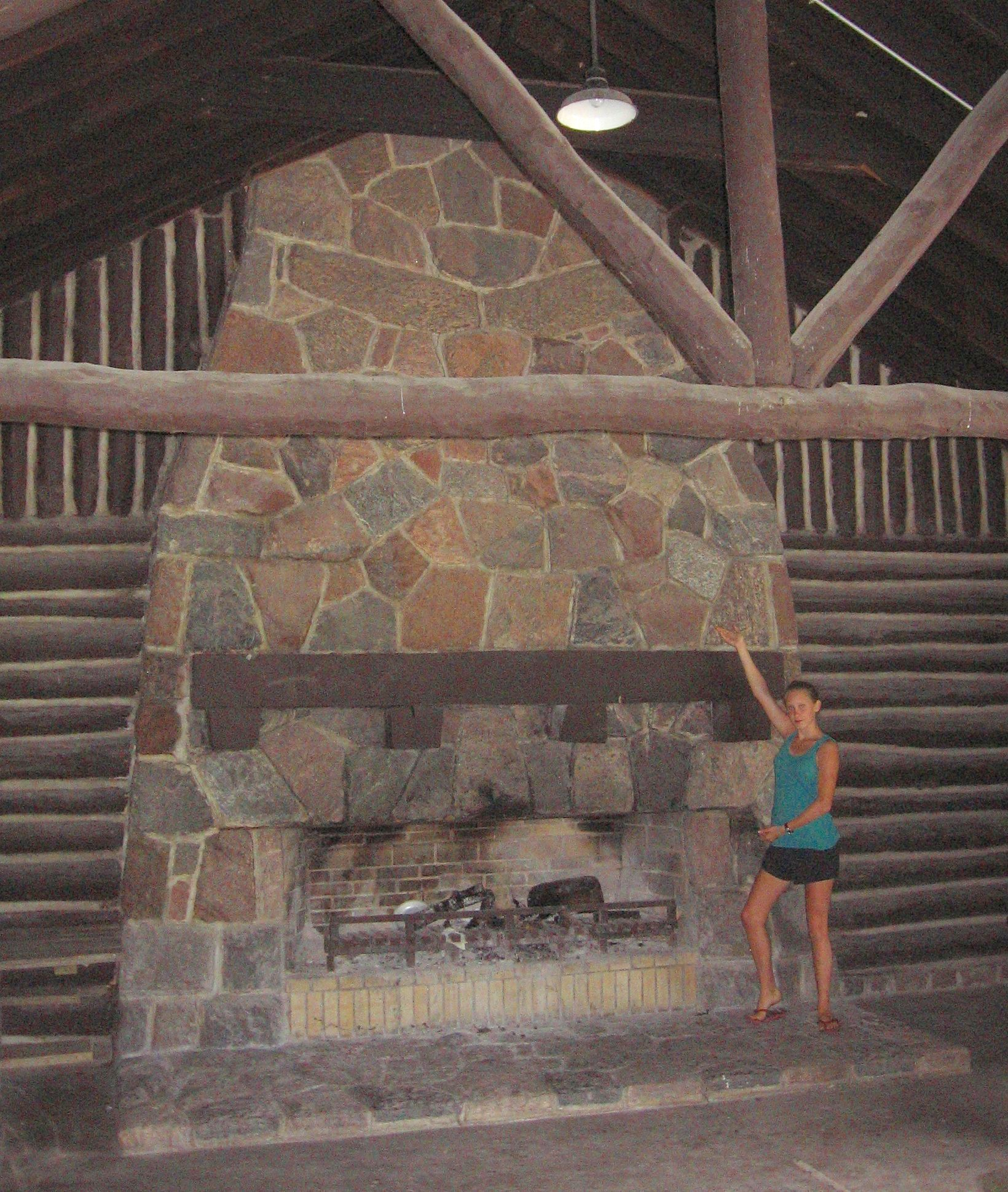
The fireplace along the interior north wall of the CCC Shelter, showing scale. The stones were hand-shaped by CCC workers using mallets and chisels.

The CCC Shelter, also known as the Combination Shelter, is a historic park shelter located at Pokagon State Park in Jamestown Township, Steuben County, Indiana. It is a stone and wood building and its construction was completed by the Civilian Conservation Corps in 1936. Although a low, wide roof gives some protection against rain and snow, the shelter is open on its longer west and east sides. The north and south ends of the structure feature tall fireplaces built with large stones found within the park, individually hewn by the CCC workers.

The shelter is now used for various programs such as the annual Autumn Storytelling or for renting cross-country skis in the winter.

Many other buildings within Pokagon State Park were constructed by the CCC during their stay from 1934 to 1942, including the Gate House (1936), Spring Shelter (1937), and the Saddle Barn (1938), and the first incarnations of the tobaggon run.

The CCC Shelter was added to the National Register of Historic Places in 1992.
