= Nevada Mills, Indiana =

- Unincorporated community
- Location within Indiana Location within the United States
- Coordinates: 41°43′37″N 85°04′56″W
- Country: United States
- State: Indiana
- County: Steuben
- Township: Jamestown
- Elevation: 978 ft (298 m)
- Time zone: UTC-5 (Eastern (EST))
  - Summer (DST): UTC-4 (EDT)
- ZIP code: 46703
- Area code: 260
- GNIS feature ID: 440012

Nevada Mills is an unincorporated community in Jamestown Township, Steuben County, in the U.S. state of Indiana.

== History ==
A post office was established at Nevada Mills in 1867, and remained in operation until 1905. An old variant name of the community was called Millville.
