= Crooked Lake, Indiana =

- Unincorporated community
- Location within Indiana Location within the United States
- Coordinates: 41°40′47″N 85°02′12″W
- Country: United States
- State: Indiana
- County: Steuben
- Township: Pleasant
- Elevation: 1,004 ft (306 m)
- Time zone: UTC-5 (Eastern (EST))
  - Summer (DST): UTC-4 (EDT)
- ZIP code: 46703
- Area code: 260
- GNIS feature ID: 452033

Crooked Lake is an unincorporated community in Pleasant Township, Steuben County, in the U.S. state of Indiana.

The Crooked Lake Association is a group of volunteer community members striving to improve the quality of lake living. They are responsible for Fourth of July activities such as Crooked Lake Independence Day Fireworks and the Crooked Lake Freedom 5, a five-mile race around the lake.

== History ==
A post office was established at Crooked Lake in 1838, but was soon discontinued, in 1843.
