= Edward Ralph May =

American lawyer and politician from Indiana (1819–1852)

- Born: May 10, 1819; Hartford, Connecticut, U.S.
- Died: August 2, 1852 (aged 33); Saint Paul, Minnesota, U.S.
- Education: Amherst College; Yale University
- Occupations: lawyer, politician
- Political party: Democratic
- Spouse: Nancy C. Orton

Edward Ralph May (May 10, 1819 – August 2, 1852) was an American lawyer and politician. He was the only delegate to the Indiana Constitutional Convention of 1850 to cast a vote in favor of permitting African American suffrage.

== May's early life and education ==
Born in Hartford, Connecticut, May entered Amherst College at age 14, then transferred to Yale University, where he graduated in 1838. After teaching school and practicing law in Norwich, Connecticut, he moved in 1843 to Angola, Indiana, a newly founded town in Steuben County with a reputation for anti-slavery sympathies. He was the county's prosecuting attorney for two years (1847–1848). A Democrat, May was elected to the Indiana House of Representatives in 1849 and in 1850 as the joint representative for Steuben and DeKalb counties. Under the law adopted for calling the Constitutional Convention of 1850, May's election to the legislature in 1850 automatically made him a delegate to the convention.

== Voting rights under the Constitution of 1816 ==
Although Indiana's first constitution, adopted in 1816, did not specifically bar voting by African Americans or other persons of color, it guaranteed the right to vote only to white male citizens over the age of 21 who had lived in the state for one year. Although the Convention of 1850 adopted an article specifically prohibiting African Americans from voting, it nonetheless debated the issue of letting them vote.

== May's stand in favor of African American suffrage ==
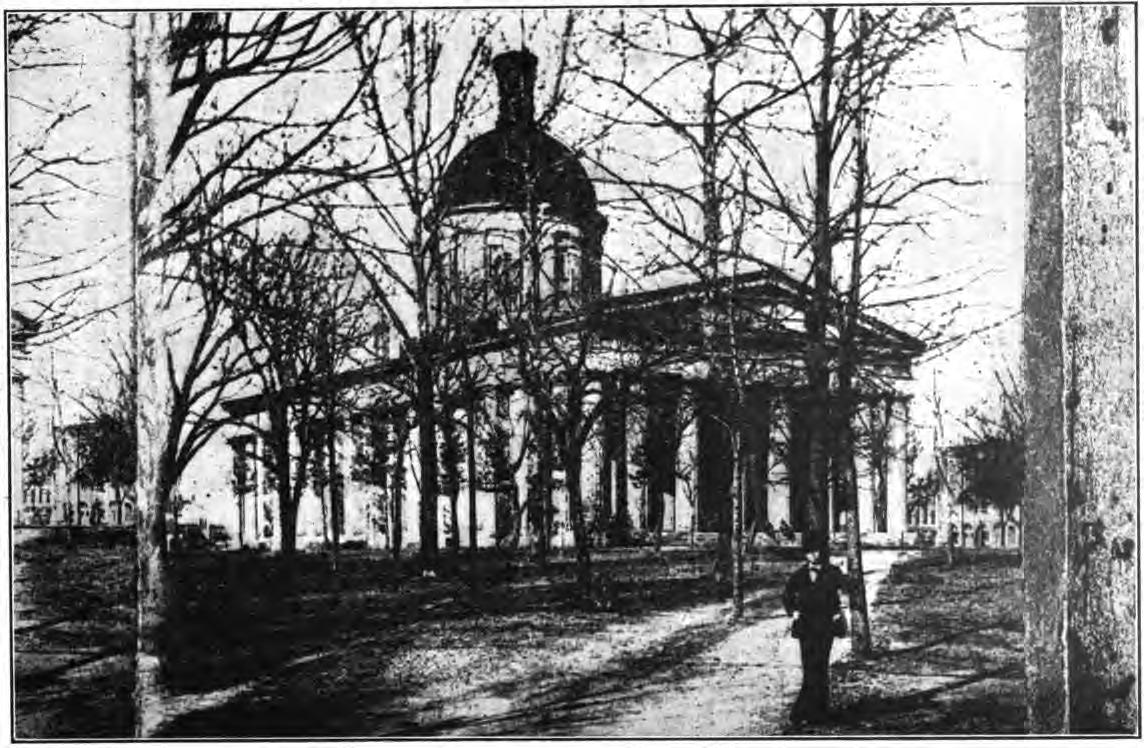
Indiana's third Statehouse, where May delivered his speech. The Constitutional Convention convened here on October 7, 1850, then moved to the nearby Masonic lodge where it met from December 26, 1850, to February 10, 1851.

On October 28, 1850, the Convention took up two petitions on behalf of African American rights: one from "certain persons of color residing in Allen county;" and one "from certain inhabitants of Steuben county on behalf of the colored race." Determination of what to do with the petitions was tabled until the convention could dispose of a proposal by delegate Schuyler Colfax (a future Vice President of the United States) to have a committee inquiry regarding "the expediency of separately submitting the question of negro suffrage to the people." Delegate George Berry of Franklin County moved to amend Colfax's motion to make it a direct instruction to the committee to approve a provision "making negroes and mulattoes voters at all elections in this state." May then rose to propose amending Berry's amendment to allow the committee to propose "such restrictions and qualifications" on African American voters as the committee "might deem necessary." On its face, May's proposal does not appear to be a particularly strong endorsement of African American voting rights, but it permitted him to launch into a speech in which he ridiculed what he saw as the hypocritical attitudes of most of the delegates on racial questions.

Although May defended giving the voting franchise to African Americans subject to qualifications such as, perhaps, property ownership, he compared the possible restrictions to those placed on immigrants from Sweden and Germany, who were not immediately allowed all of the rights of citizenship. The main point of May's speech, however, was not to propose voting restrictions as such but to force the delegates to step back from an uncompromising opposition to African American suffrage. May said:

I have said, sir, that under certain restrictions, with certain qualifications, I would give the colored man the right to vote. I am not now prepared to say what those restrictions should be. I do not desire to tell this Convention under what circumstances the negro shall be allowed to vote. It would be but labor lost, for it is only too clearly to be seen that his Convention have already determined that the negro shall never vote in the State of Indiana. To that decision I of course submit, but it does not accord with my notions of right.

After challenging the Convention "to declare under what circumstances, coupled with what restrictions, they [African Americans] shall enjoy the rights and privileges of men," May made an ironic observation about the majority's apparent willingness to tax African Americans without giving them the vote:

Then, sir, let us prove our superiority by assisting, or rather our magnamity by allowing, the negro to rise above his present, degraded sphere. We already allow him the privilege of supporting our government by paying his taxes with the rest. Gentlemen see no danger in that. Then let us grant him the right to vote, and thus participate in the government which he assists to support.

May's amendment to Berry's proposed amendment failed on a voice vote. When Berry's amendment came up for a recorded vote, even Berry deserted it, leaving May, in a vote of 122 to 1, as the only delegate to support the principle of unqualified suffrage for African American males.

== African American suffrage in the Constitution of 1851 ==
On August 4, 1851, Indiana voters ratified the new constitution in a referendum. Article 2, Section 5, as approved, read: "No Negro or Mulatto shall have the right of suffrage." The 1851 document also contained an article, adopted as a separate question by voters in the referendum, barring new African American immigration into the state. May opposed the immigration ban and May's home county of Steuben was one of only three of Indiana's 92 counties to vote against excluding African Americans from the state.

== After the Convention ==
May returned to Angola and married Nancy C. Orton in 1851. He did not seek re-election to the legislature. In 1852, May and his wife moved to Saint Paul, Minnesota, where both of them died, apparently of cholera.
