= Pokagon Interpretive Center =

Coordinates: 41°42′30.4″N 85°01′50.6″W

The interpretive center located in Pokagon State Park, Angola, Indiana, contains animals and displays about Pokagon and its surrounding areas. It is staffed by full-time and part-time naturalists. The Interpretive Center is the start of some interpretive hikes and the adjacent auditorium is the site of some programs.
