= Jamestown, Steuben County, Indiana =

Jamestown
- Unincorporated community
- Location within Indiana Location within the United States
- Coordinates: 41°45′00″N 85°01′02″W
- Country: United States
- State: Indiana
- County: Steuben
- Township: Jamestown
- Elevation: 974 ft (297 m)
- Time zone: UTC-5 (Eastern (EST))
  - Summer (DST): UTC-4 (EDT)
- ZIP code: 46737
- Area code: 260
- GNIS feature ID: 436933

Jamestown is an unincorporated community in Jamestown Township, Steuben County, in the U.S. state of Indiana.
