= Fox Lake (Angola, Indiana) =

- U.S. National Register of Historic Places
- U.S. Historic district
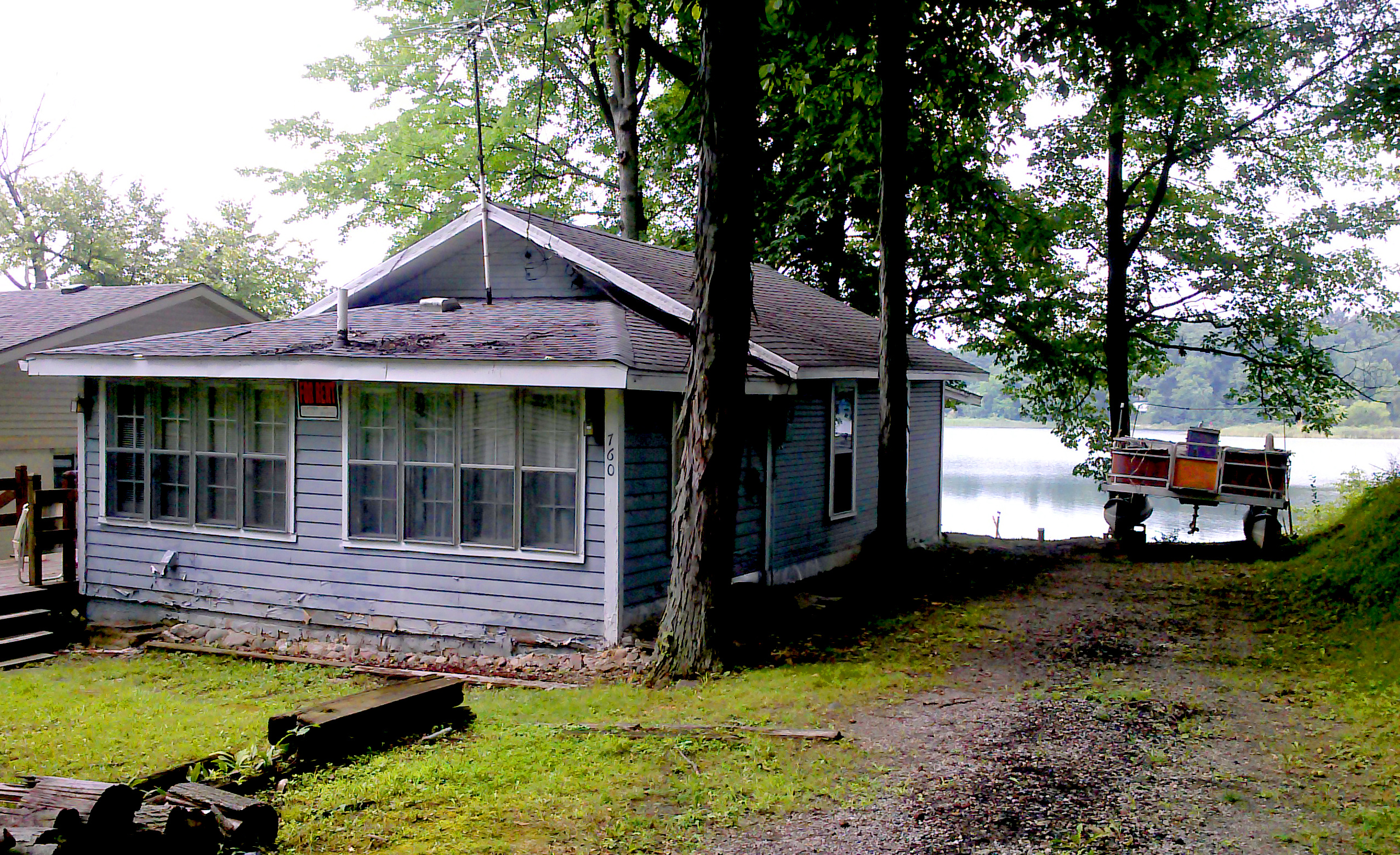
- Fox Lake Resort, August 2013

- Location within Indiana Location within the United States
- Nearest city: 60-760 Lane 130, southwest of Angola in Pleasant Township, Steuben County, Indiana
- Coordinates: 41.623772°N 85.025474°W
- Area: 10.7 acres (4.3 ha)
- Architectural style: Lake cottage
- NRHP reference No.: 01000360 (original); 100012764 (increase)

Significant dates
- Added to NRHP: April 12, 2001
- Boundary increase: March 2, 2026

Fox Lake is a national historic district located in Pleasant Township, Steuben County, Indiana. The district encompasses 27 contributing buildings associated with the Fox Lake Resort vacation community. It developed between 1928 and 1950 as a vacation resort for middle-class African-Americans. The cottages are primarily one-story, frame dwellings with gable roofs and concrete block foundations.

It was listed on the National Register of Historic Places in 2001.
