= Jamestown, Georgia =

Town in Georgia, United States

Coordinates: 32°16′20.54″N 84°50′20.73″W

Jamestown is an extinct town in Chattahoochee County, Georgia, United States.

== History ==
A post office called Jamestown was established in 1849, and remained in operation until 1914. The community was named after John A. James, a railroad agent.
