= USS Jamestown =

USS Jamestown may refer to any one of a number of United States Navy vessels.

- USS Jamestown (1844), was a sloop that served from 1844 until 1892
- USS Jamestown (PG-55), was a patrol gunboat that served from 1941 until 1946
- USS Jamestown (AGTR-3), was originally a Liberty ship (AG-166) completed in 1945, converted and renamed in 1963, and then redesignated in 1964 to AGTR-3. Scrapped in 1970.
