= Millgrove Township, Steuben County, Indiana =

Millgrove Township
- Township
- Location in Steuben County
- Coordinates: 41°44′05″N 85°08′12″W
- Country: United States
- State: Indiana
- County: Steuben

Government
  - Type: Indiana township

Area
  - Total: 23.74 sq mi (61.5 km^{2})
  - Land: 22.03 sq mi (57.1 km^{2})
  - Water: 1.71 sq mi (4.4 km^{2}) 7.20%
- Elevation: 955 ft (291 m)

Population (2020)
  - Total: 1,619
  - Density: 71.6/sq mi (27.6/km^{2})
- Time zone: UTC-5 (Eastern (EST))
  - Summer (DST): UTC-4 (EDT)
- Area code: 260
- GNIS feature ID: 453629

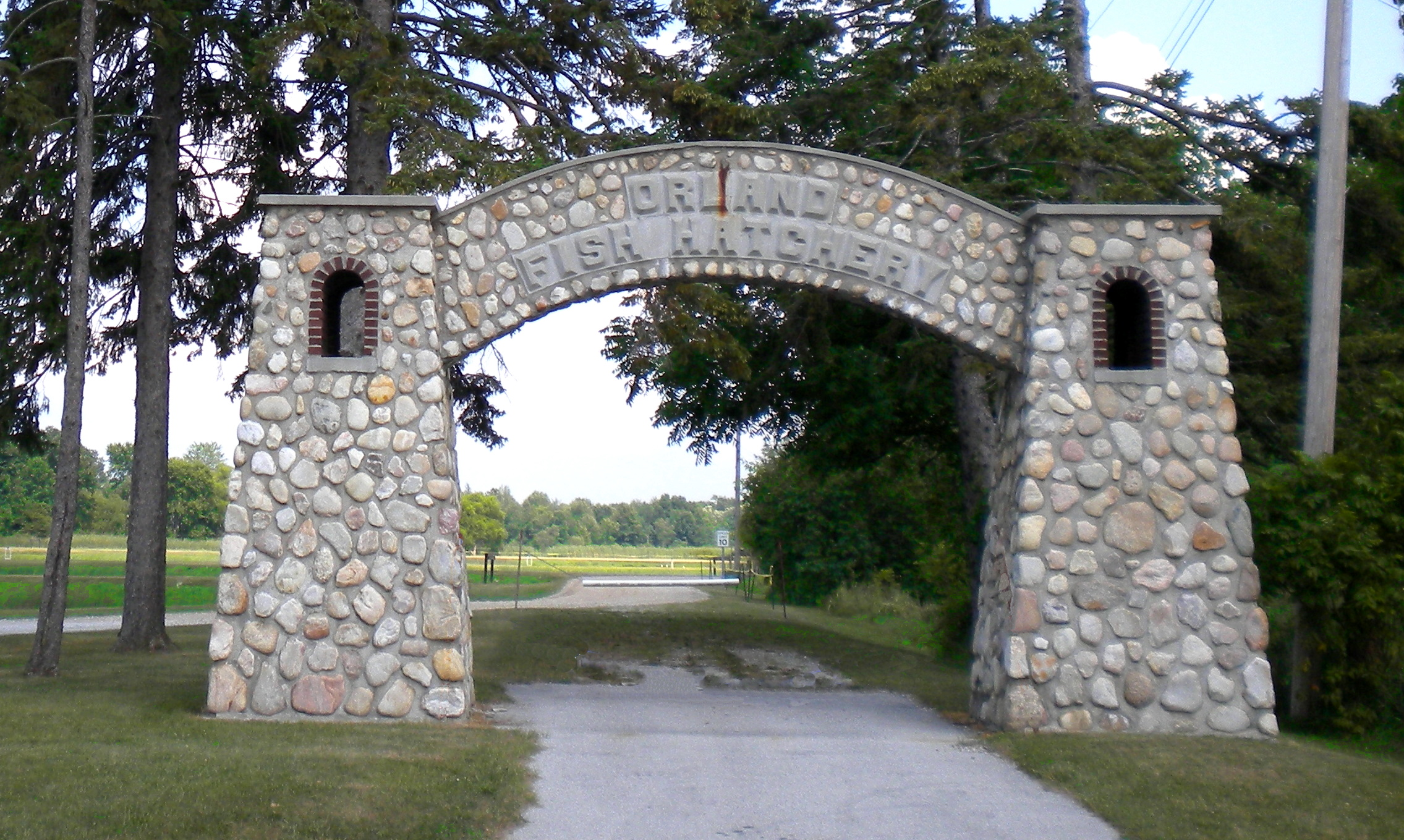
The Fawn River State Fish Hatchery, on the National Register of Historic Places, is located a mile north of Orland.

Millgrove Township is one of twelve townships in Steuben County, Indiana, United States. As of the 2020 census, its population was 1,619, up from 1,577 at 2010, and it contained 960 housing units.

== History ==
Fawn River State Fish Hatchery was listed on the National Register of Historic Places in 1997.

== Geography ==
According to the 2010 census, the township has a total area of 23.74 square miles (61.5 km^{2}), of which 22.03 square miles (57.1 km^{2}) (or 92.80%) is land and 1.71 square miles (4.4 km^{2}) (or 7.20%) is water. Lakes in this township include Bell Lake, Brown Lake, Chair Factory Lake, Lake Gage, Lake Syl-van, Lime Lake, Lime Lake, Perch Lake, Rhodes Lake, Sally Owen Lake, Tamarack Lake and Warner Lake. The stream of Crooked Creek runs through this township.

=== Cities and towns ===
- Orland

=== Unincorporated towns ===
- Panama at 41.7064392°N 85.1074684°W

(This list is based on USGS data and may include former settlements.)

=== Cemeteries ===
The township contains three cemeteries: Carlton, Greenlawn and Mill Grove.

=== Major highways ===
- Interstate 80
- Indiana State Road 120
- Indiana State Road 327
