= Jamestown, Morrow County, Ohio =

Jamestown is a ghost town in Morrow County, in the U.S. state of Ohio.

== History ==
Jamestown had its start when James Bailey opened a store there. Appleton Rich had a blacksmith's in the town as well. Allen Kelly bought the shop from Bailey, opened a tannery, and a post office, of which he was the postmaster. Kelly later sold the store, at which point the town became a ghost town.
