= Collins School =

- U.S. National Register of Historic Places
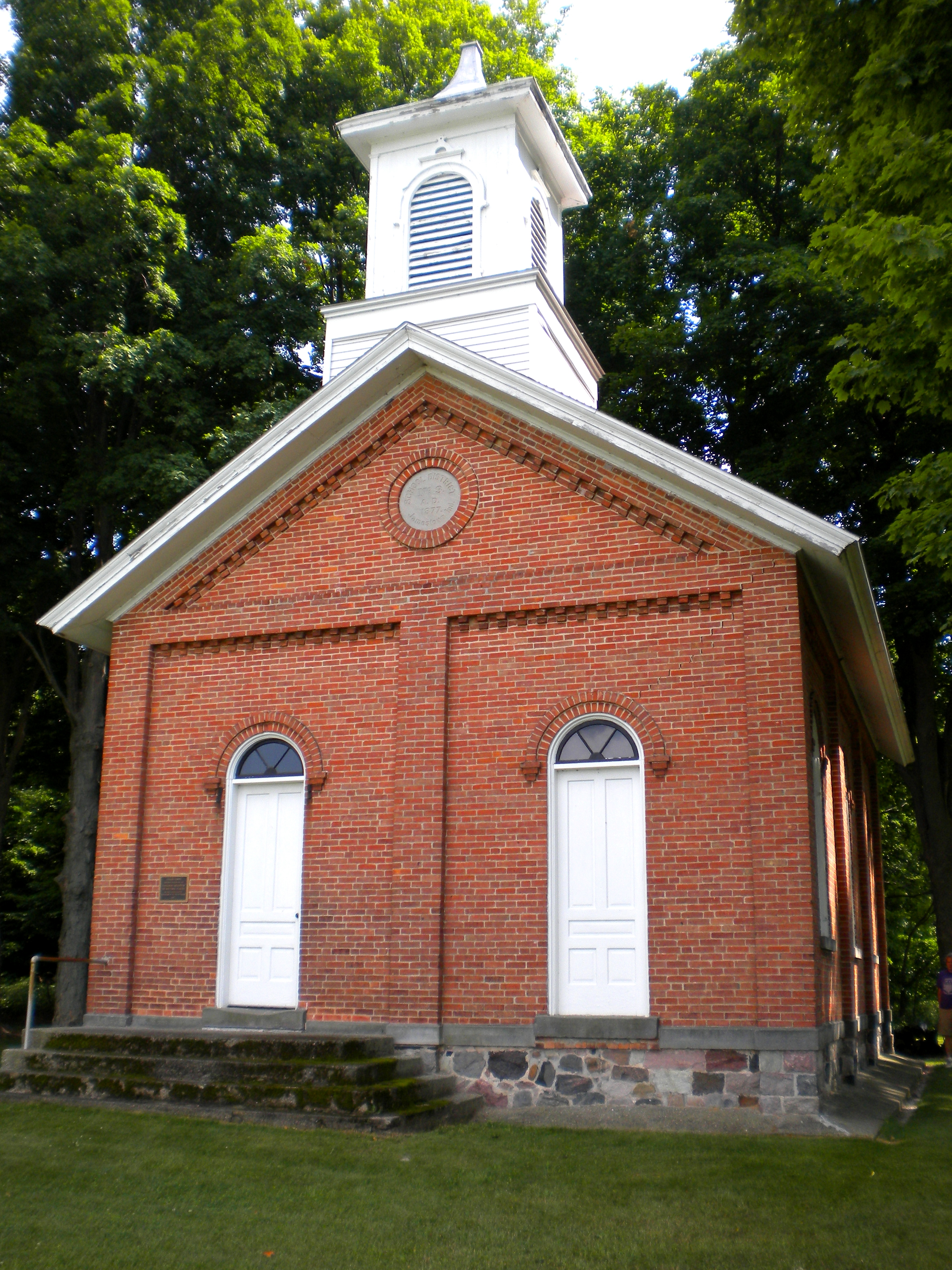
- Collins School, July 2009

- Location within Indiana
- Location: State Road 120, 0.7 miles east of County Road 450W, and west of Fremont in Jamestown Township, Steuben County, Indiana
- Coordinates: 41°44′45″N 85°3′47″W
- Area: less than one acre
- Built: 1877
- Architectural style: Italianate
- MPS: Indiana's Public Common and High Schools MPS
- NRHP reference No.: 02001173
- Added to NRHP: October 16, 2002

Collins School, also known as Jamestown Township District #3 School, is a historic one-room school building located in Jamestown Township, Steuben County, Indiana. It was built in 1877, and is a one-story, rectangular, Italianate style brick building. It has a steep gable roof topped by a square-plan belfry containing the original bell. It remained in use as a school until in 1943. It was restored in 1966–1967.

It was listed on the National Register of Historic Places in 2002.
