= Orland, Indiana =

- Town
- Location of Orland in Steuben County, Indiana.
- Coordinates: 41°43′50″N 85°10′20″W
- Country: United States
- State: Indiana
- County: Steuben
- Township: Millgrove
- Established: 1834

Area
  - Total: 0.69 sq mi (1.78 km^{2})
  - Land: 0.69 sq mi (1.78 km^{2})
  - Water: 0 sq mi (0.00 km^{2})
- Elevation: 958 ft (292 m)

Population (2020)
  - Total: 389
  - Density: 567.2/sq mi (219.01/km^{2})
- Time zone: UTC-5 (Eastern (EST))
  - Summer (DST): UTC-4 (EDT)
- ZIP code: 46776
- Area code: 260
- FIPS code: 18-57006
- GNIS feature ID: 2396836
- Website: www.in.gov/towns/orland/

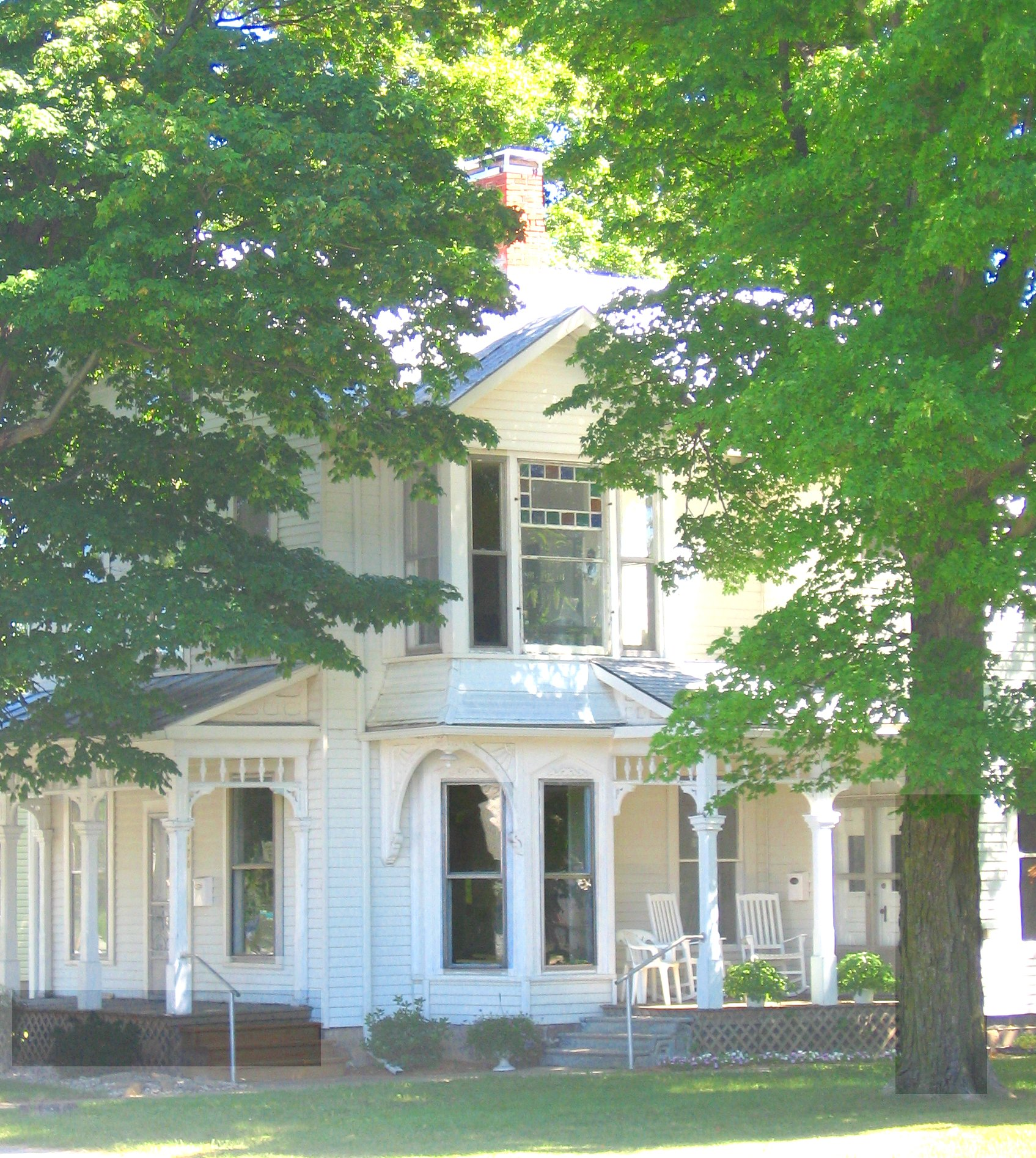
The Ernsberger House, formerly a stop on the Underground Railroad. Today, it is better known as the Parker House, once home to John G. Parker and his wife Elmira J. Parker, daughter of Michigan Governor Cyrus Gray Luce.

Orland is a town located in the northwest corner of Steuben County, Indiana in Millgrove Township at the intersection of State Road 120 and State Road 327. The population was 389 at the 2020 census.

== History ==
Orland is recognized as the first settlement in Steuben County, populated by migrants from Vermont and originally known as Vermont Settlement. Each year in late July, Orland celebrates this heritage with the Vermont Settlement Festival. Orland was settled in 1834 after a Vermont man named John Stocker had gone prospecting for his family and the families of his neighbors. Stocker chose this particular piece of land because of the rich burr-oak openings he found. Pioneers coming from Windham County, Vermont, arrived shortly thereafter and built a Baptist church. The town established a post office in 1837.

In the decades leading up to the Civil War, Orland was a stop on the Underground Railroad, sheltering and protecting runaway slaves until they could complete the journey to Windsor, Upper Canada. The home of Russell Brown was said to contain a secret apartment on the second floor, complete with a separate stairway, in which 15 to 20 slaves might hide. S. U. Clark's hotel also was said to have a secret hiding place behind a basement cupboard, while the Butler family south of Orland "fed and sheltered scores of them and then took them on to other stations."

At one time or another during the period leading up to the Civil War, Brown, Clark, Benjamin Waterhouse, and Captain Samuel Barry were arrested for violating the Fugitive Slave Act of 1850. Both Waterhouse and Barry were convicted, with Barry serving one hour in jail and paying a $30 fine (although other sources put the fine at $1000).

Fawn River State Fish Hatchery was listed on the National Register of Historic Places in 1997.

During the 2019–20 coronavirus pandemic, confirmed cases of COVID-19 were reported on May 2, 2020, at a local meat processing plant run by Miller Poultry which resulted in sanitation of the plant and the implementation of safety measures such as temperature checks, social distancing & available personal protective equipment for workers.

== Geography ==
According to the 2010 census, Orland has a total area of 0.66 square miles (1.71 km^{2}), all land.

== Demographics ==
Historical population
Census	Pop.	Note	%±
1880	416		—
1920	322		—
1930	310		−3.7%
1940	307		−1.0%
1950	386		25.7%
1960	424		9.8%
1970	457		7.8%
1980	424		−7.2%
1990	361		−14.9%
2000	341		−5.5%
2010	434		27.3%
2020	389		−10.4%
U.S. Decennial Census

=== 2010 census ===
As of the census of 2010, there were 434 people, 168 households, and 117 families living in the town. The population density was 657.6 inhabitants per square mile (253.9/km^{2}). There were 190 housing units at an average density of 287.9 per square mile (111.2/km^{2}). The racial makeup of the town was 96.3% White, 1.2% African American, 1.6% from other races, and 0.9% from two or more races. Hispanic or Latino of any race were 9.0% of the population.

There were 168 households, of which 31.5% had children under the age of 18 living with them, 53.0% were married couples living together, 10.7% had a female householder with no husband present, 6.0% had a male householder with no wife present, and 30.4% were non-families. 28.6% of all households were made up of individuals, and 14.3% had someone living alone who was 65 years of age or older. The average household size was 2.58 and the average family size was 3.16.

The median age in the town was 40.2 years. 24% of residents were under the age of 18; 9.2% were between the ages of 18 and 24; 21.4% were from 25 to 44; 29% were from 45 to 64; and 16.1% were 65 years of age or older. The gender makeup of the town was 50.0% male and 50.0% female.

=== 2000 census ===
As of the census of 2000, there were 341 people, 137 households, and 90 families living in the town. The population density was 512.8 inhabitants per square mile (198.0/km^{2}). There were 153 housing units at an average density of 230.1 per square mile (88.8/km^{2}). The racial makeup of the town was 98.83% White, 0.29% Native American, 0.29% Asian, 0.29% from other races, and 0.29% from two or more races. Hispanic or Latino of any race were 0.29% of the population.

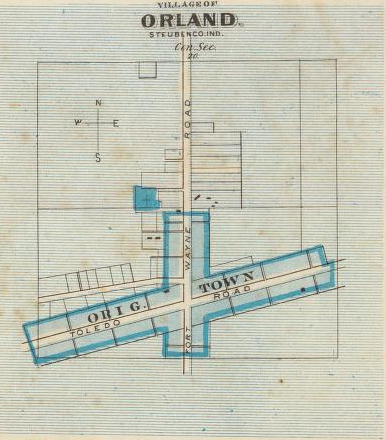
Orland, Indiana from 1876 Atlas

There were 137 households, out of which 34.3% had children under the age of 18 living with them, 49.6% were married couples living together, 12.4% had a female householder with no husband present, and 33.6% were non-families. 29.2% of all households were made up of individuals, and 13.9% had someone living alone who was 65 years of age or older. The average household size was 2.49 and the average family size was 3.10.

In the town, the population was spread out, with 27.6% under the age of 18, 8.2% from 18 to 24, 29.9% from 25 to 44, 19.9% from 45 to 64, and 14.4% who were 65 years of age or older. The median age was 36 years. For every 100 females, there were 100.6 males. For every 100 females age 18 and over, there were 93.0 males.

The median income for a household in the town was $38,542, and the median income for a family was $45,417. Males had a median income of $33,438 versus $20,893 for females. The per capita income for the town was $15,188. About 9.2% of families and 7.9% of the population were below the poverty line, including 11.4% of those under age 18 and 7.7% of those age 65 or over.

== Education ==
The town has a lending library, the Joyce Public Library.

== Notable natives and former residents ==
- Azariah Southworth (May 13, 1986), Television producer/personality 2006–2008.
- Rollie Zeider (1883–1967), major league baseball player, moved to Orland in 1959
