= Steuben County Jail =

- U.S. National Register of Historic Places
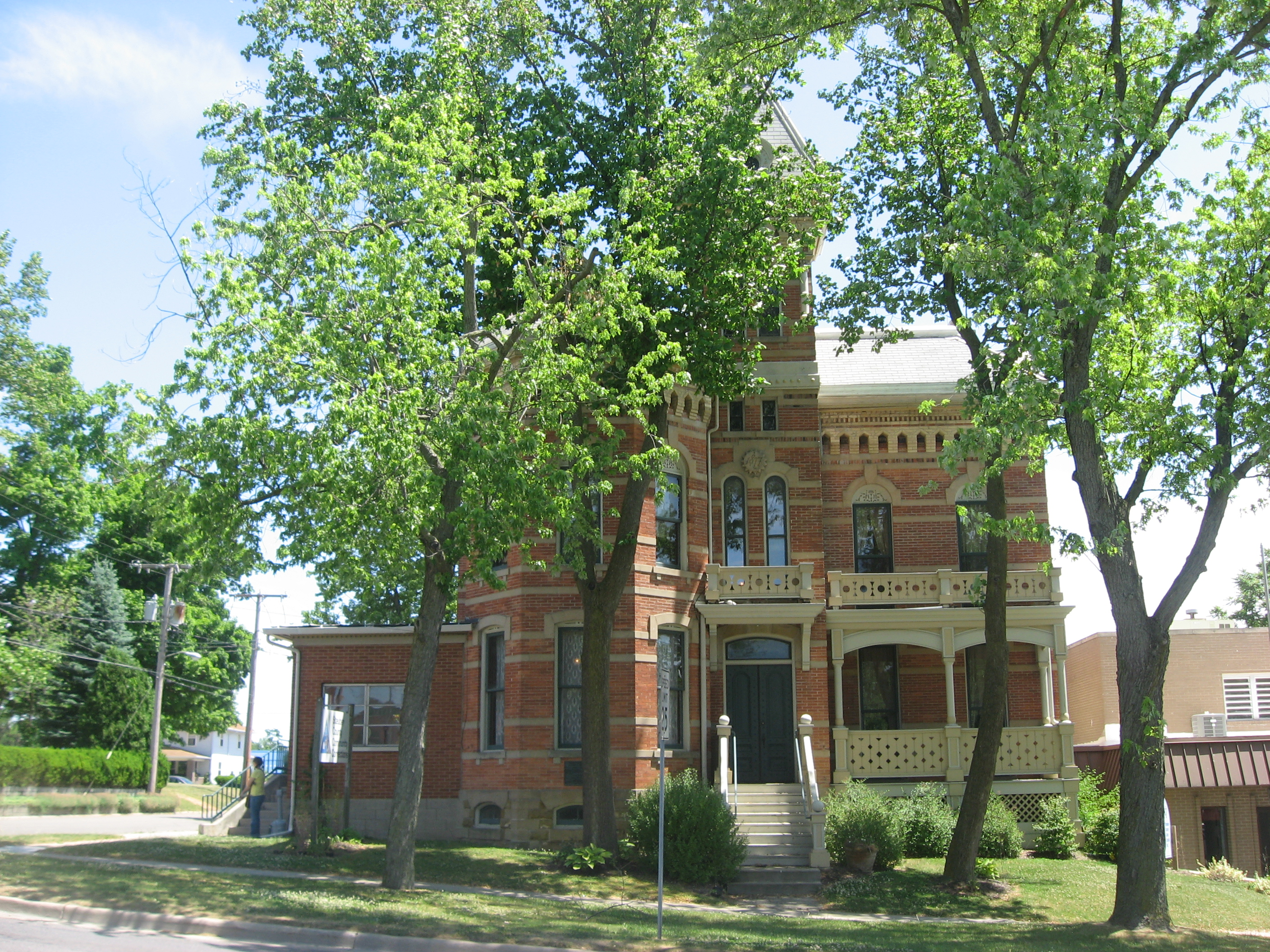
- Steuben County Jail, May 2012

- Location within Indiana Location within the United States
- Location: 201 S. Wayne, Angola, Indiana
- Coordinates: 41°38′2″N 84°59′57″W
- Area: less than one acre
- Built: 1877
- Architect: Gibbs & Moser; Litzenberger & Zoller
- Architectural style: Second Empire
- NRHP reference No.: 76000035
- Added to NRHP: April 2, 1976

Steuben County Jail is a historic jail located at Angola, Indiana. It was built in 1877, and is a 2 1/2-story, brick and concrete building with Second Empire style design elements. It consists of an irregular main section with a rectangular prison wing at the rear. A porch was enclosed in 1961 and wing added in 1971. The main section is topped by a slate mansard roof and has an elaborate tower with a pyramidal roof and elaborate cupola.

It was listed on the National Register of Historic Places in 1976.
