= Jamestown Township, Steuben County, Indiana =

Jamestown Township
- Township
- Location in Steuben County
- Coordinates: 41°43′51″N 85°01′43″W
- Country: United States
- State: Indiana
- County: Steuben

Government
  - Type: Indiana township

Area
  - Total: 23.68 sq mi (61.3 km^{2})
  - Land: 20.7 sq mi (54 km^{2})
  - Water: 2.98 sq mi (7.7 km^{2}) 12.58%
- Elevation: 974 ft (297 m)

Population (2020)
  - Total: 3,269
  - Density: 157/sq mi (61/km^{2})
- Time zone: UTC-5 (Eastern (EST))
  - Summer (DST): UTC-4 (EDT)
- Area code: 260
- GNIS feature ID: 453476

Jamestown Township is one of twelve townships in Steuben County, Indiana, United States. As of the 2020 census, its population was 3,269, up from 3,249 at 2010, and it contained 2,724 housing units.

== History ==
Pokagon State Park, Collins School, and CCC Shelter are listed on the National Register of Historic Places.

== Geography ==
According to the 2010 census, the township has a total area of 23.68 square miles (61.3 km^{2}), of which 20.7 square miles (54 km^{2}) (or 87.42%) is land and 2.98 square miles (7.7 km^{2}) (or 12.58%) is water. Lakes in this township include Barton Lake, Big Otter Lake, Failing Lake, Green Lake, Hog Lake, Jimmerson Lake, Lake Charles West, Lake Lonidaw, Lake Minfenokee, Little Otter Lake, Lone Hickory Lake, Long Beach Lake, Marsh Lake, Middle Basin of Lake James, Seven Sisters Lakes, Snow Lake and the Upper Basin of Lake James. The stream of Follette Creek runs through this township.

=== Unincorporated towns ===
- Jamestown at 41.7483836°N 85.0174646°W
- Lake James at 41.7050503°N 85.0482994°W
- Nevada Mills at 41.7269947°N 85.0821895°W
- Potawatomi Inn (a hotel in Pokagon State Park)
- Valley Outlet Center (a shopping center)

(This list is based on USGS data and may include former settlements.)

=== Cemeteries ===
The township contains one cemetery, Jamestown.

=== Major highways ===
- Interstate 69
- Interstate 80
- Interstate 90
- State Road 120
- State Road 127

== Education ==
Jamestown Township residents may obtain a free library card from the Fremont Public Library.
