= Steuben County Courthouse =

- U.S. National Register of Historic Places
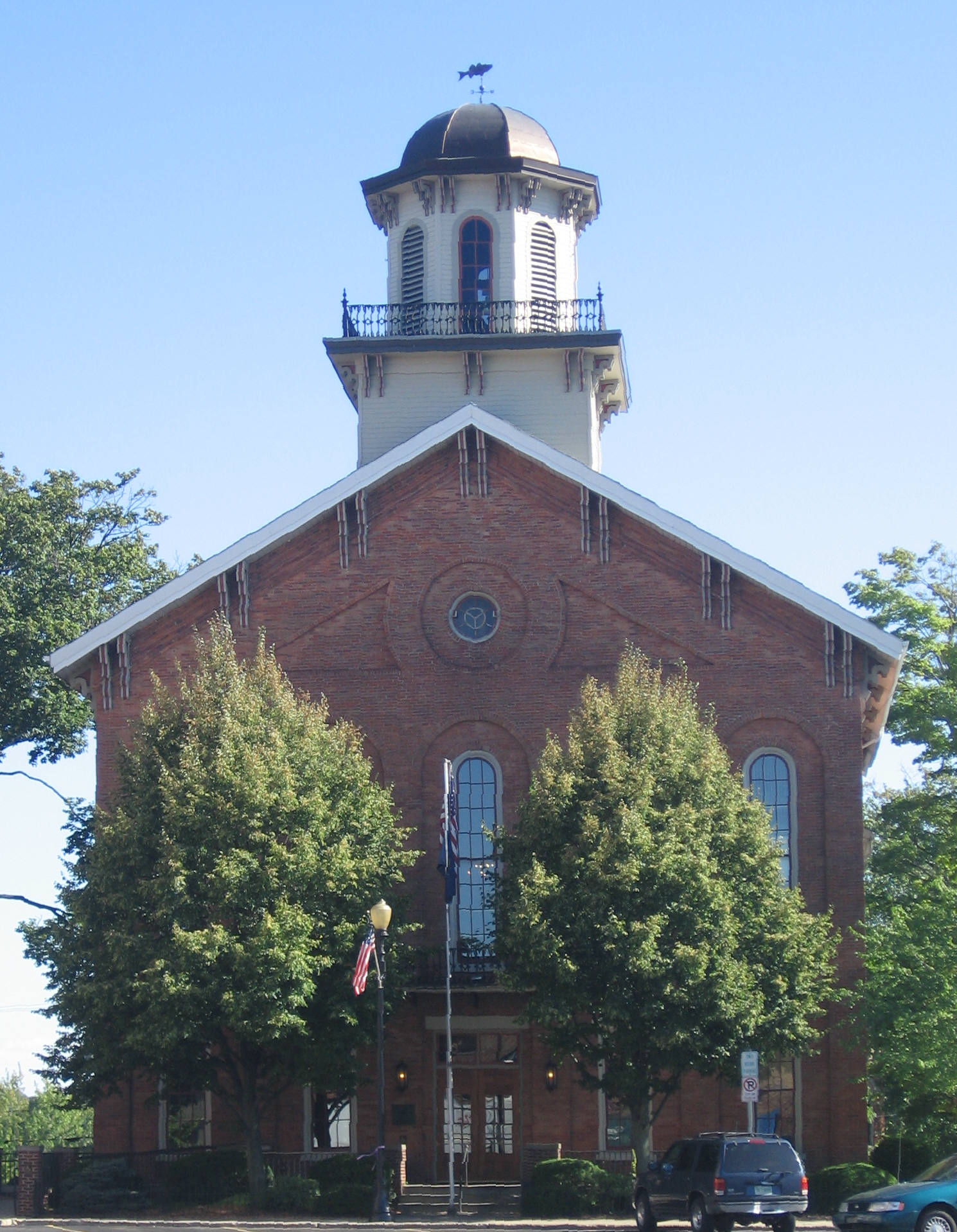
- Steuben County Courthouse, August 2006

- Location within Indiana Location within the United States
- Interactive map showing the location of Steuben County Courthouse
- Location: Public Sq., Angola, Indiana
- Coordinates: 41°38′3″N 84°59′57″W
- Area: 1 acre (0.40 ha)
- Built: 1867-1868
- Built by: Wakefield, Hiram A.
- Architectural style: Greek Revival, Italianate, Romanesque
- NRHP reference No.: 75000051
- Added to NRHP: May 12, 1975

Steuben County Courthouse is a historic courthouse located at Angola, Indiana. It was built in 1867–1868, and is a two-story, rectangular, brick building with Greek Revival, Italianate, and Romanesque Revival style design influences. It features a gable roof with bracketed eaves and topped by an octagonal domed cupola with a square base and captain's walk.

It was listed on the National Register of Historic Places in 1975.
