= Fawn River State Fish Hatchery =

- U.S. National Register of Historic Places
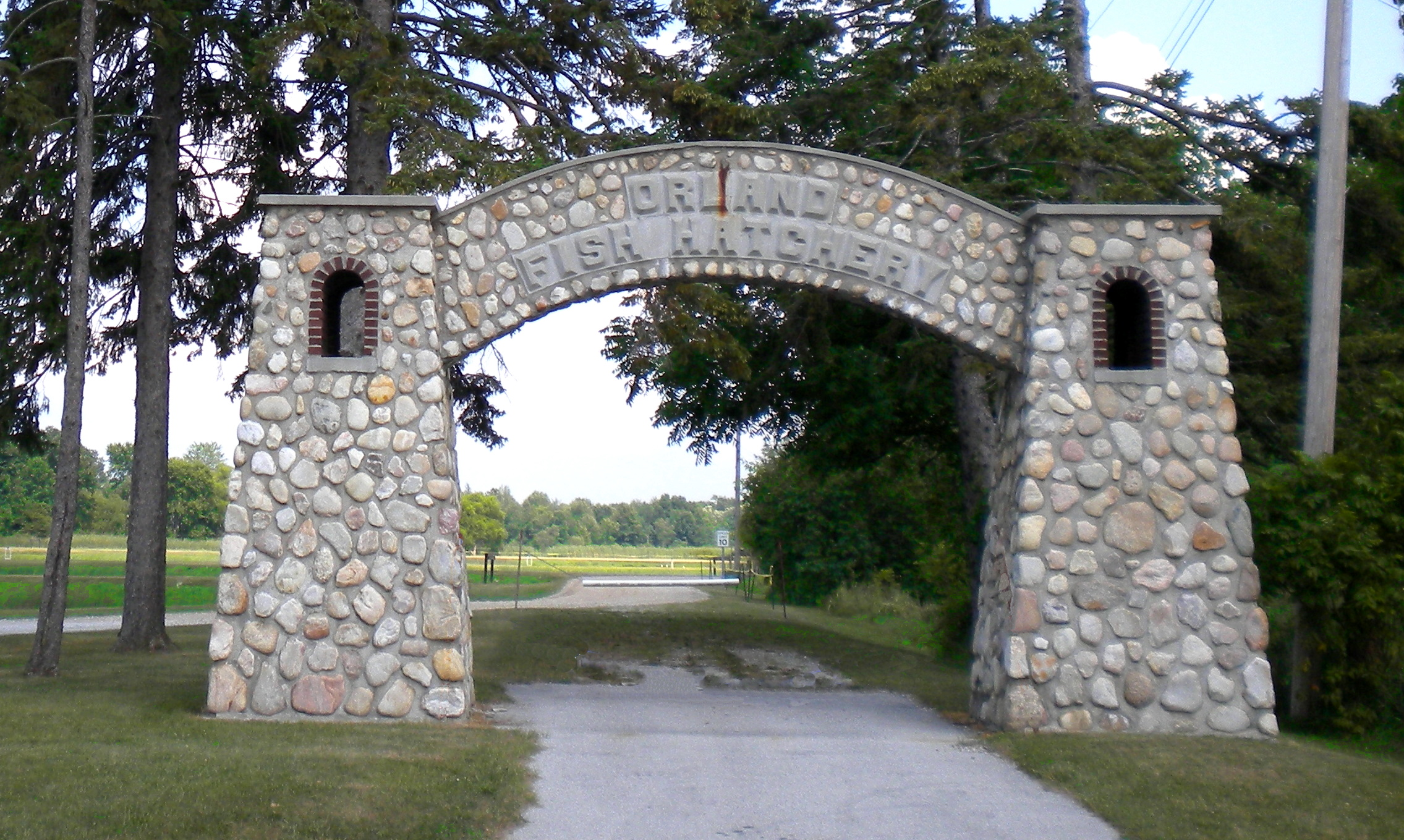
- Fawn River State Fish Hatchery arch, July 2009

- Location within Indiana Location within the United States
- Location: 6889 N. State Road 327, Orland and Millgrove Township, Steuben County, Indiana
- Coordinates: 41°44′30″N 85°10′22″W
- Area: 46.8 acres (18.9 ha)
- Built: 1935-1942
- Built by: Works Progress Administration
- Architectural style: Colonial Revival
- MPS: New Deal Resources on Indiana State Lands MPS
- NRHP reference No.: 96001553
- Added to NRHP: January 2, 1997

Fawn River State Fish Hatchery, also known as the Orland Fish Hatchery, is a historic hatchery located at Orland and Millgrove Township, Steuben County, Indiana. It was developed between 1935 and 1937 by the Works Progress Administration, and dedicated in 1942. Contributing resources include the entrance arch, fieldstone bridge, eight rearing ponds, the property manager's residence, the Colonial Revival style hatchery building, a dam impounding the supply pond, four small pools, and six large rearing ponds.

It was listed on the National Register of Historic Places in 1997.
