= Pokagon State Park =

State park in Indiana, United States

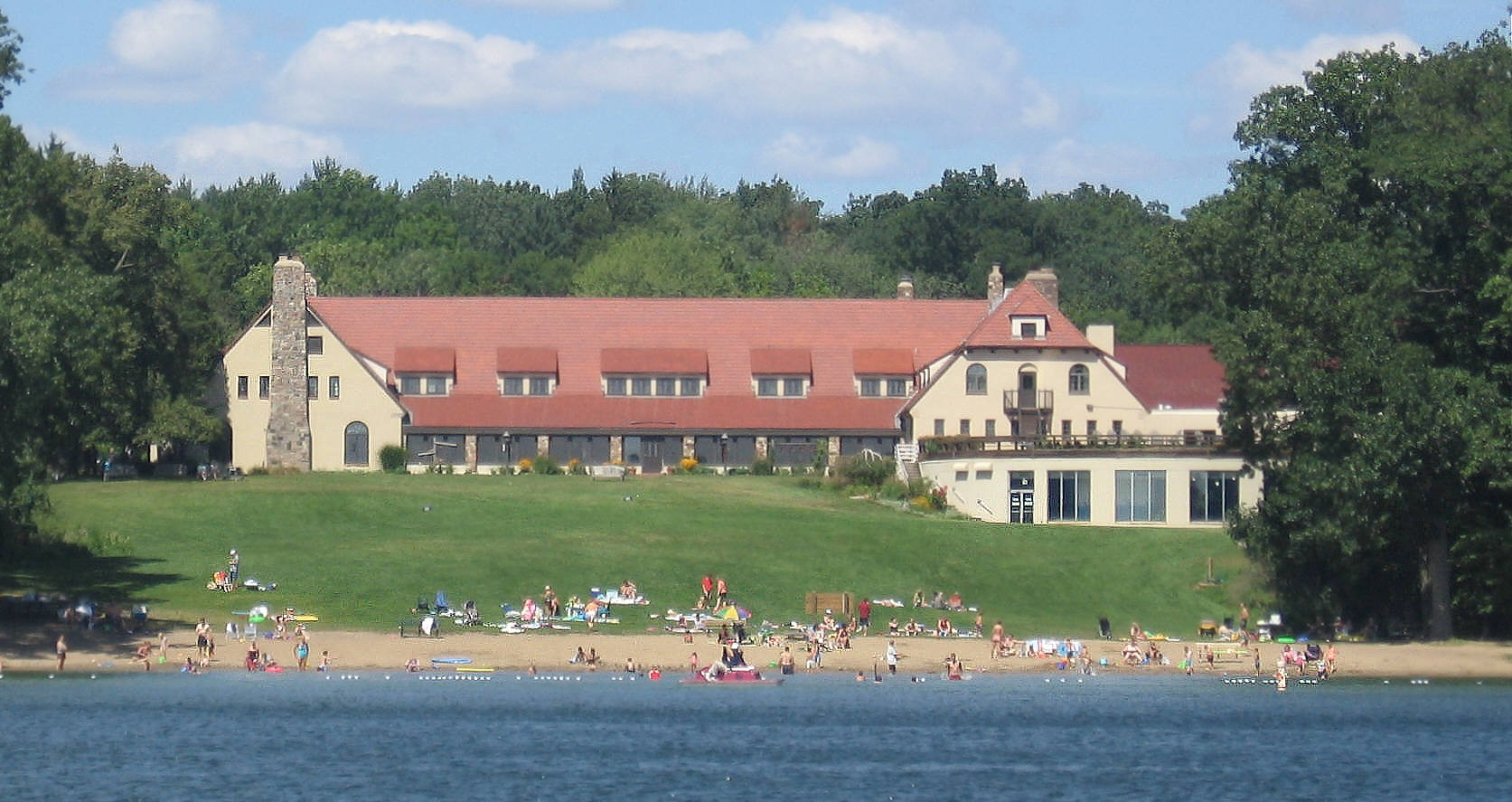
- Potawatomi Inn at Pokagon State Park

- Location within Indiana
- Location: Steuben County, Indiana, United States
- Nearest city: Angola, Indiana
- Coordinates: 41°42′50″N 85°01′31″W
- Area: 1,260 acres (5.1 km^{2})
- Established: 1925
- Visitors: 638,087 (in 2018–2019)
- Governing body: Indiana Department of Natural Resources
- Website: www.in.gov/dnr/parklake/2973.htm
- Pokagon State Park
- U.S. National Register of Historic Places
- U.S. Historic district
- Nearest city: Angola, Indiana
- Area: 1,040 acres (420 ha)
- Built: 1927
- Built by: Civilian Conservation Corps
- Architectural style: Park rustic
- MPS: New Deal Resources in Indiana State Parks MPS
- NRHP reference No.: 95001540
- Added to NRHP: January 11, 1996

Pokagon State Park is an Indiana state park in the northeastern part of the state, near the village of Fremont and 5 miles (8 km) north of Angola. It was named for the 19th-century Potawatomi chief, Leopold Pokagon, and his widely known son, Simon Pokagon, at Richard Lieber's suggestion. The 1,260-acre (5.1 km^{2}) park has an inn, camping facilities, and a staff of full-time naturalists. Pokagon receives nearly 640,000 visitors annually.

== Overview ==
The park is bordered by Lake James on the west and south and Snow Lake on the north. Various wetlands can be seen throughout the park, and the Potawatomi Nature Preserve makes up a large portion of its east side. Over 10 miles (16 km) of hiking trails wind through the park.

The Wisconsin Glacier, the last of the ice age's four glaciers that covered Indiana, created the rolling terrain found in Pokagon. Glaciation's influence can be seen in many of the features of the park, including Lake Londiaw (a kettle lake), Hell's Point (a kame), and various glacial erratics.

The toboggan run is a popular destination during the winter. Visitors can reach speeds of 35–40 miles per hour (55–65 km/h) on the quarter-mile (400 m) long track.

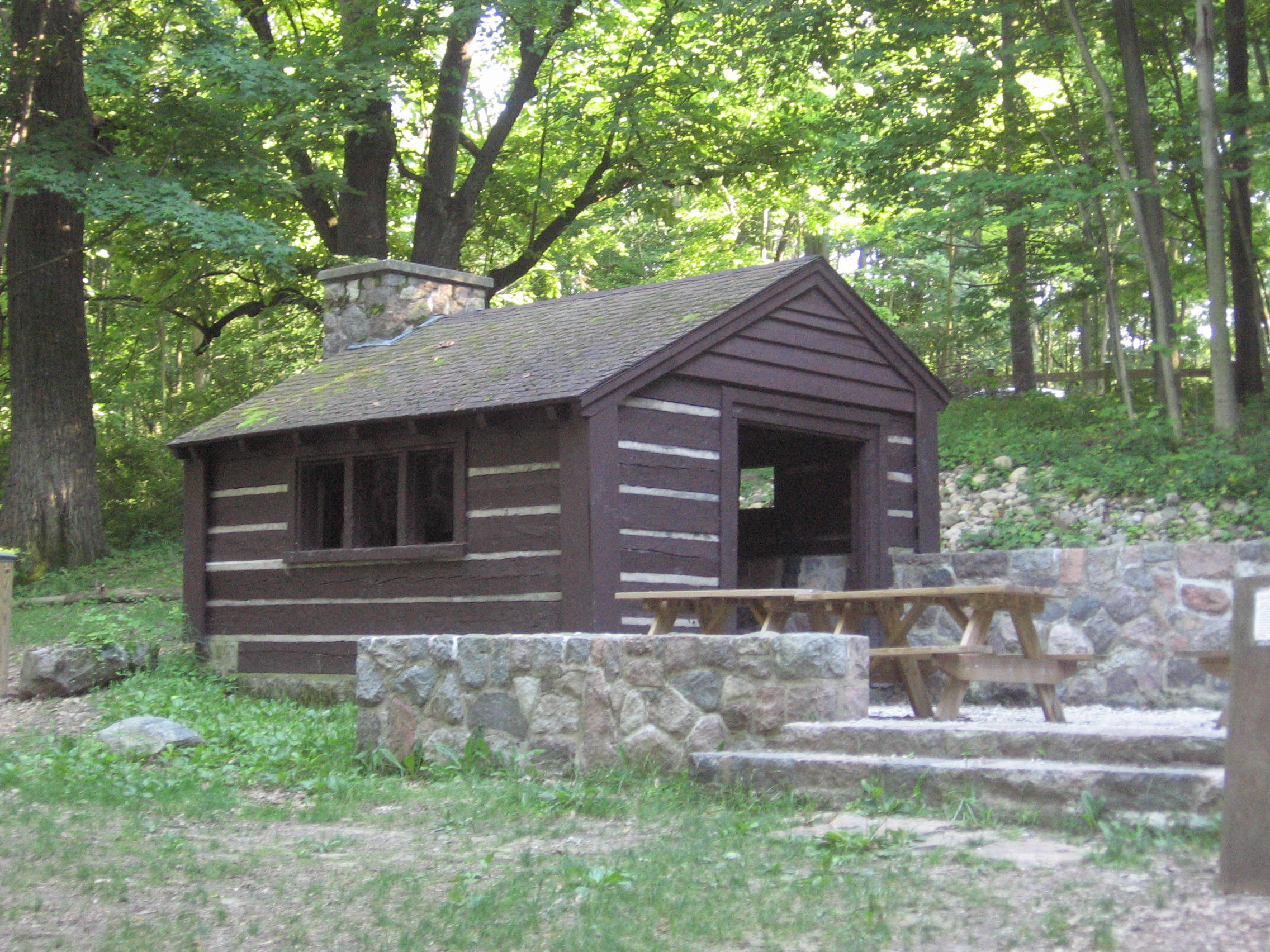
The Spring Shelter, so named because of the artesian spring nearby, was built by the Civilian Conservation Corps in 1937 during the Great Depression.

== History ==
Pokagon State Park was created in 1925. Through fundraising efforts, the citizens of the county purchased the first 580 acres (2.3 km^{2}), much of it farmland, on the shores of Lake James. The county citizens donated this land to the Department of Conservation, State of Indiana, which added two additional parcels the following year, bringing the park up to 707 acres (2.9 km^{2}). In 1927, the newly christened Potawattomi Inn opened its doors. In 1934, Pokagon Boy's Camp opened in what is now the State Park's group camping area; many of the camp's buildings have been repurposed for their current uses.

It was listed on the National Register of Historic Places in 1995.

=== Civilian Conservation Corps ===
In 1934, chapter 556 of the Civilian Conservation Corps (CCC) arrived at Pokagon. During the ensuing eight years, the CCC constructed many of the best-known buildings at Pokagon including the Gate House, the Spring Shelter, the Saddle Barn, the first three incarnations of the toboggan run, and, not least, the CCC Shelter, a National Register of Historic Places site. Behind the Beach House, the land quickly rises to a bluff overlooking the lake.

The CCC also planted trees—sometimes in precise lines—and created roads and trails. They even published their own newsletter, the Pokagon Chieftain. The CCC was instrumental in transforming Pokagon into the rustic park it is today.

Presently the park contains 1,260 acres (5.1 km^{2}). Efforts were made to secure a property across the street from Pokagon. It was officially transferred in June 2007. It will be managed by Pokagon State Park and called Trine State Recreation Area.

=== Potawatomi Inn ===
The Potawatomi Inn opened in 1927 only two years after the park was created. The Inn contained 40 guest rooms, the dining room and the Lonidaw Lounge. Along the south of the dining room, was an open porch, overlooking Lake James. A room cost $3 for the night. In the 1960s additional rooms were added to the west. The original rooms were equipped with bathrooms and the long porch on the south was enclosed to create a sunny area overlooking the lake. During the 1980s a swimming pool with an outdoor deck was added on the south side of the new wing. Increased demand allowed for the park to expand in the 1990s and in 1995 the conference center opened with additional guest rooms.

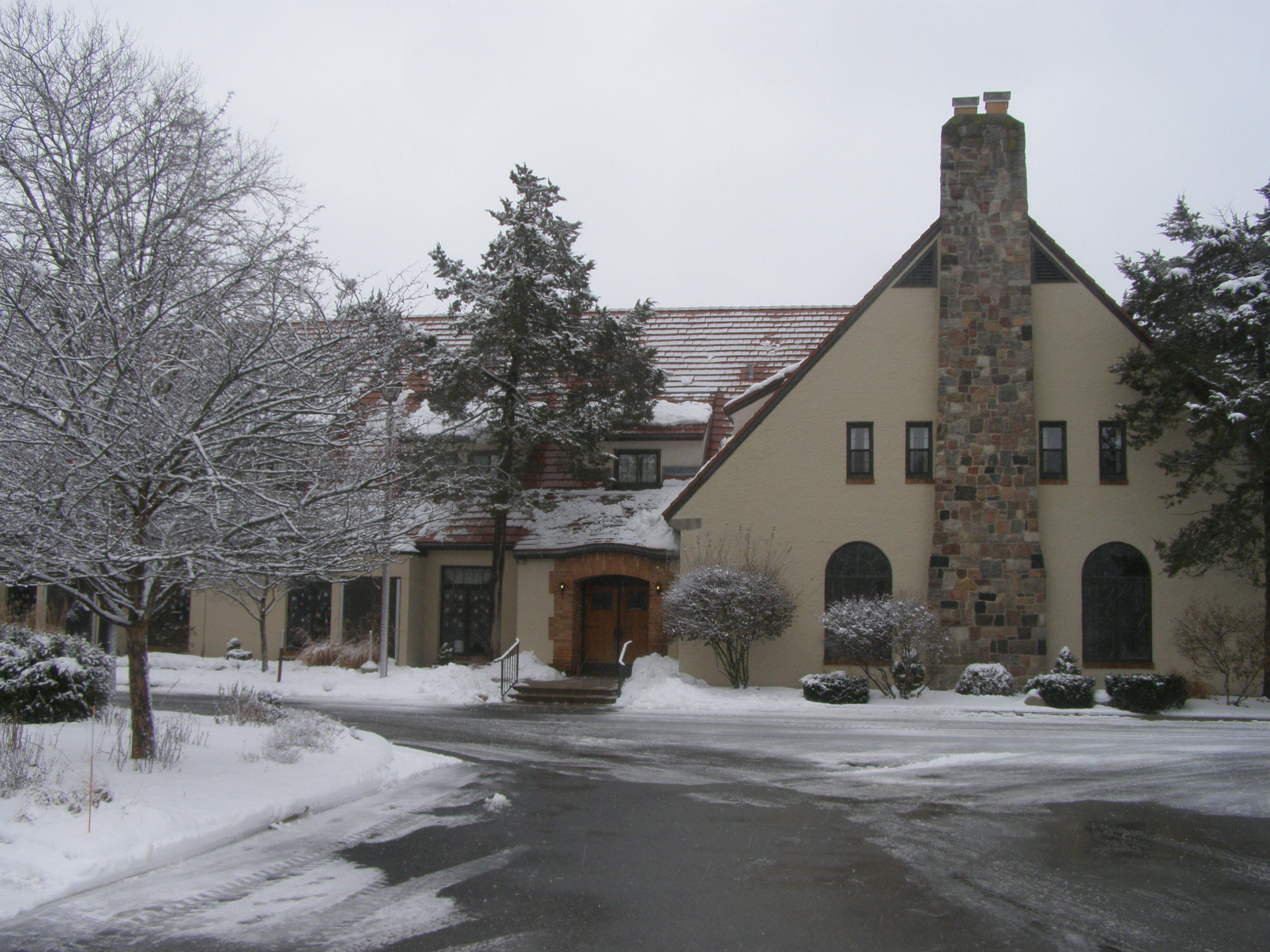
Historic Potawatomi Inn with original entrance visible.

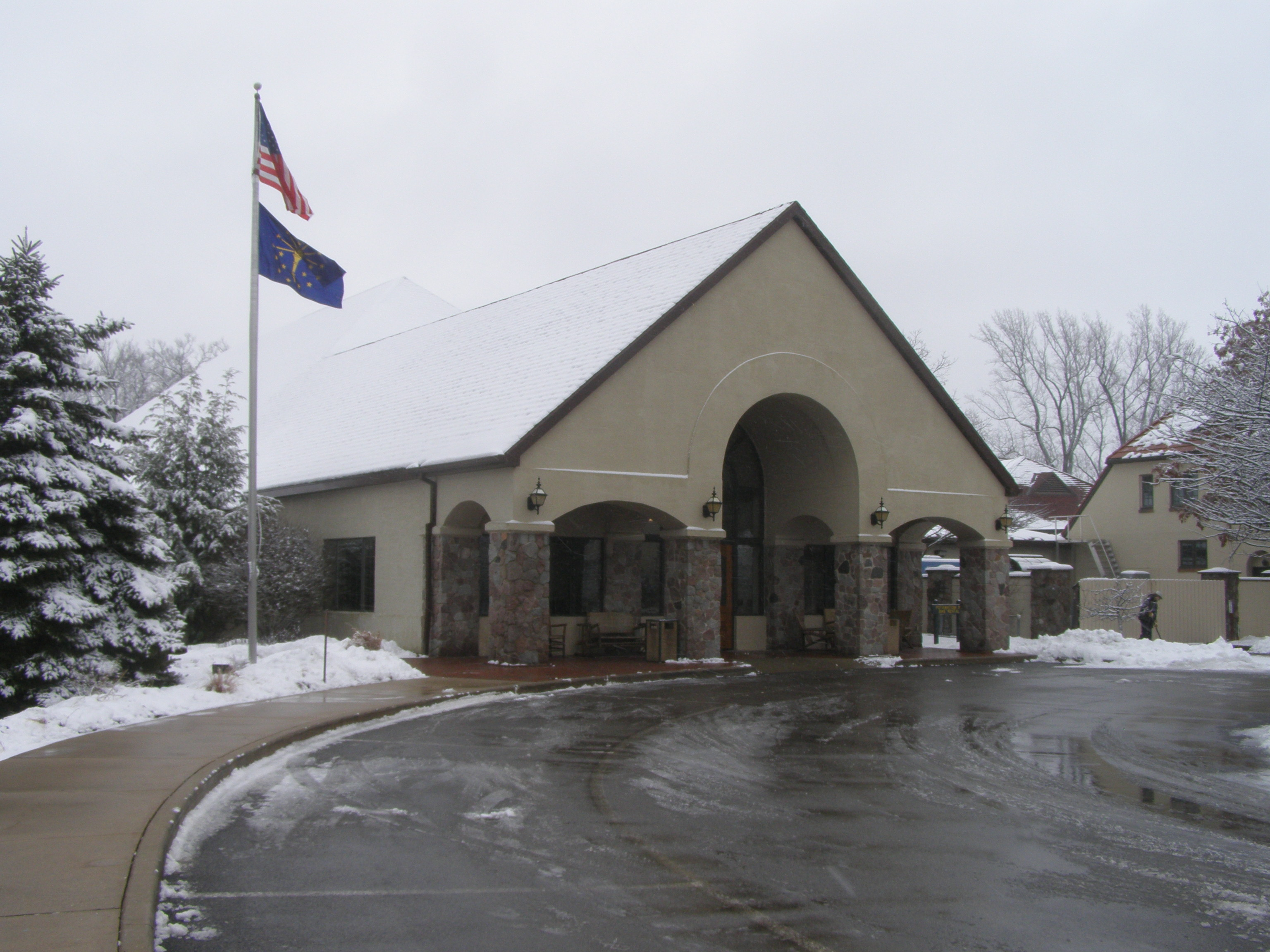
Modern entrance to Potawatomi Inn.

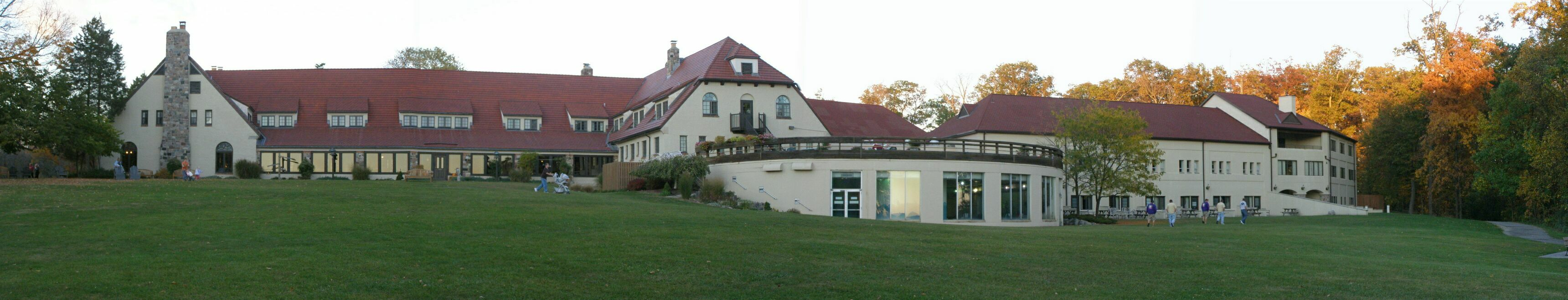
Historic structure to the left, pool additions with 20th-century addition to the right.

== Nature preserves ==
=== Potawatomi Nature Preserve ===
Located across the eastern half of the park, it is accessible from three separate trails, (#3, #6, #9). This is a varied environment of marsh, hardwood forests, pine forest and sand hills.

=== Beechwood Nature Preserve ===
Located outside the park on its northeastern corner, the preserve is accessible from Trail 8. A 1.5-mile (2.4 km) loop trail covers the old meadows. The area is become covered by gray dogwood and other pioneer woody plants. The area features yellow birch, red maple, blue beech, and skunk cabbage. The remnants of an old apple orchard may still be visible. Access is also available from State Road 127.

== Fish and wildlife ==
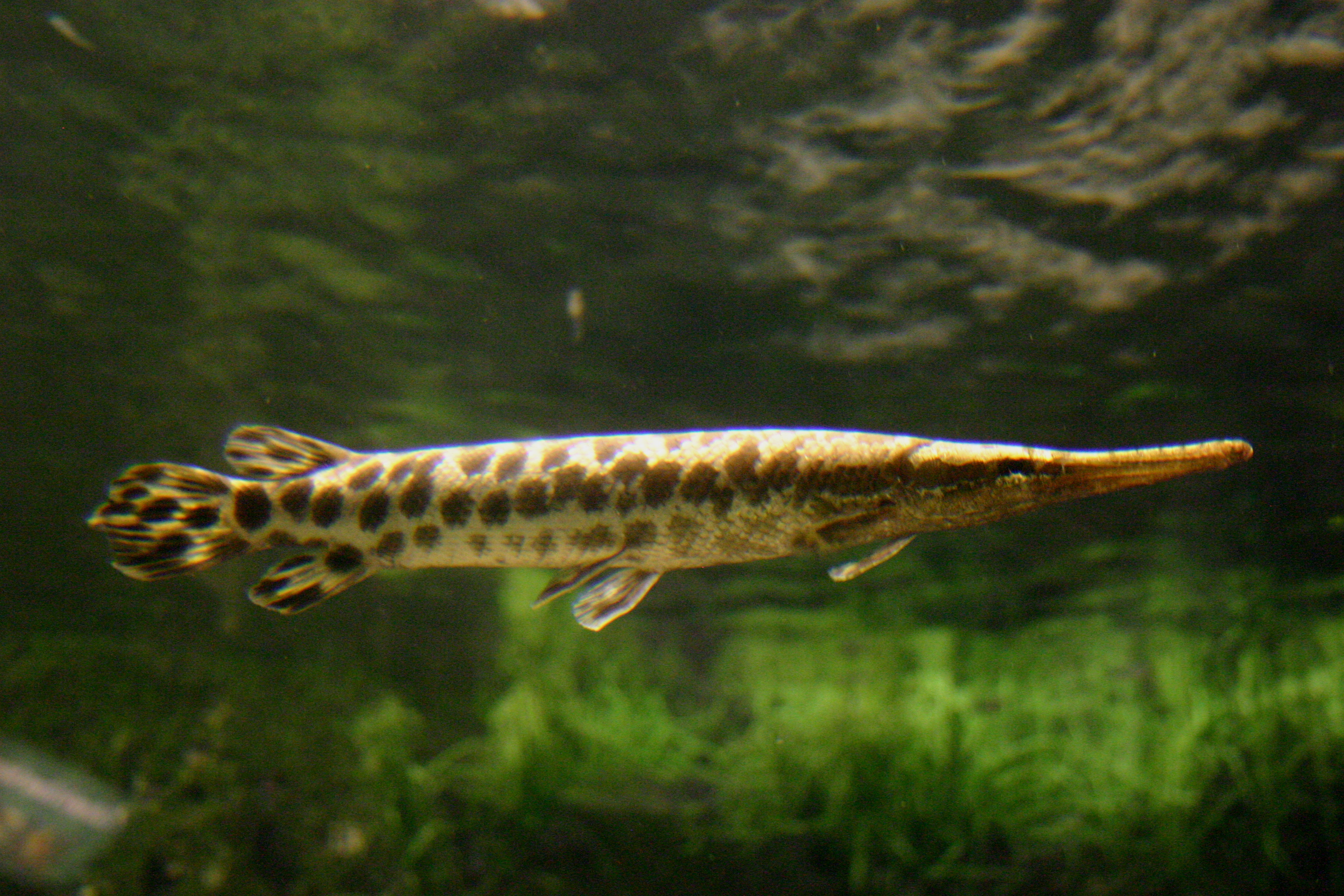
Spotted gar

The common fish found in Lake James include: yellow perch, largemouth bass, northern pike, bluegill, rock bass, and spotted gar.

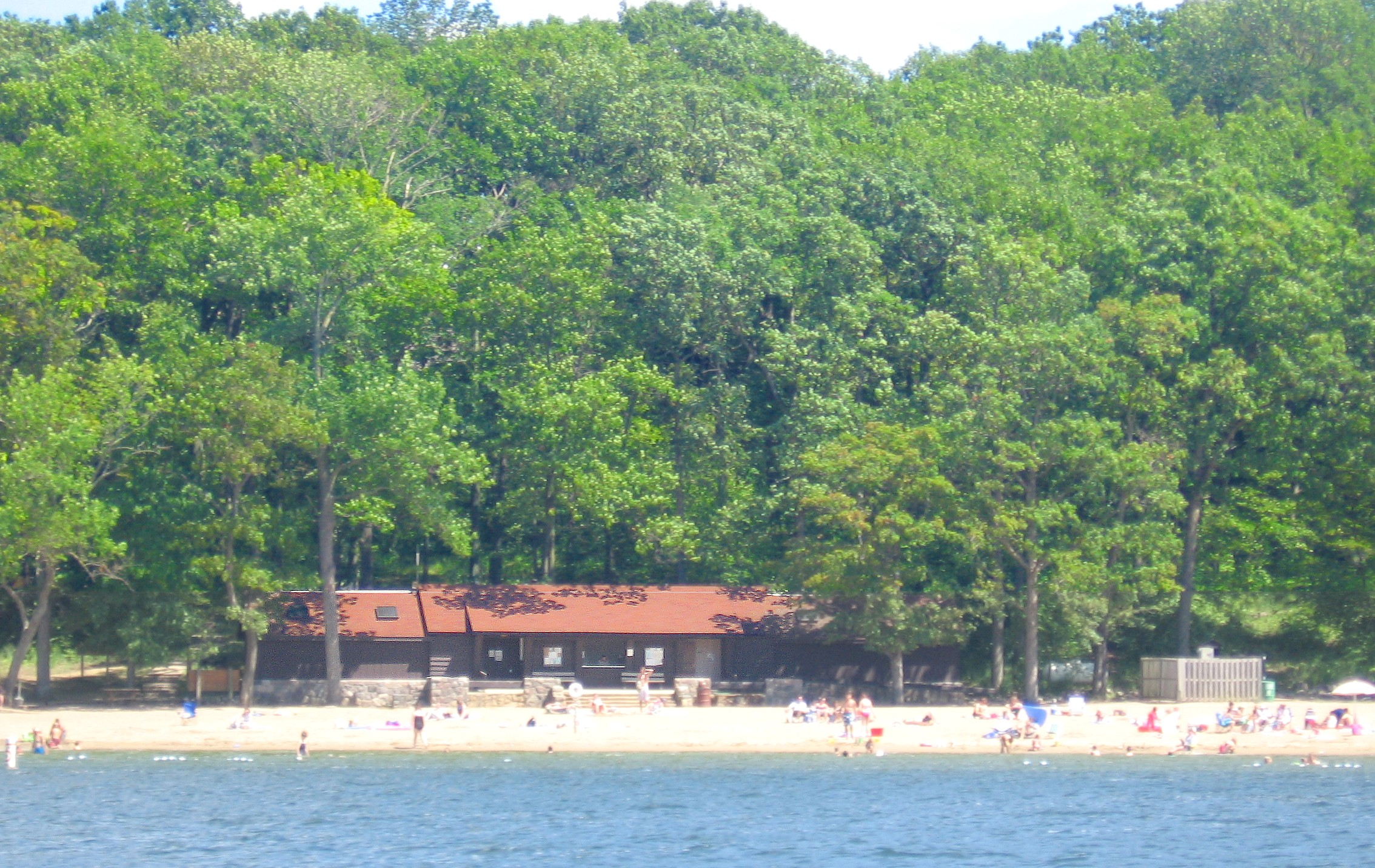
The Beach House, on the western edge of Pokagon, as seen from Lake James. Behind the Beach House, the land quickly rises to a bluff overlooking the lake.

Beavers, coyotes, and foxes can be found in this park.

Pokagon and its surrounding lakes are the home for a variety of birds. Common birds such as ducks, geese, gulls, and purple martins can be found when the lake is not frozen. Migrating birds such as loons, grebes, and double-crested cormorants can also be observed by visitors, typically during autumn. Hawks and red-headed woodpeckers can be seen year around, as can barred and great horned owls. Several bald eagles were sighted on the lake in 2006. Other birds that can be observed by visitors including brown creepers, veeries, several types of warblers, bluebirds, Carolina wrens, Baltimore orioles, and pileated woodpeckers.

Amphibians include mud puppies, salamanders, and frogs. The common reptiles include the garter snake, the eastern massasauga, the hognose snake, the northern water snake, plus the painted turtle, snapping turtle, and the soft shell turtle. All of which are available to see at the nature center.

== Facilities and activities ==
- Bicycle trail
- Hiking trails (including Hell's Point Challenge)
- Pokagon Interpretive Center
- Picnicking
- Playground equipment
- Swimming / beach
- Sand volleyball court
- Saddle barn
- Fishing
- Boating
- Potawatomi Inn
- Cabins
- Meeting and conference facilities
- Reservable shelters
- Camping - reservations recommended
  - Electric hookup 200 sites
  - Non-electric 73 sites
  - Youth tent areas
  - Group camp
  - General store
  - Dumping station
- Winter activities
  - Toboggan run
  - Cross-country skiing
  - Ice fishing

== Equipment rentals ==
- Pontoon boats
- Paddleboats
- Rowboats
- Toboggan (weekends only, in season)
- Ski rental (winter)
- Horse-back riding (seasonal)

== See also ==
- List of Indiana state parks
