= Angola, Indiana =

Angola
- City
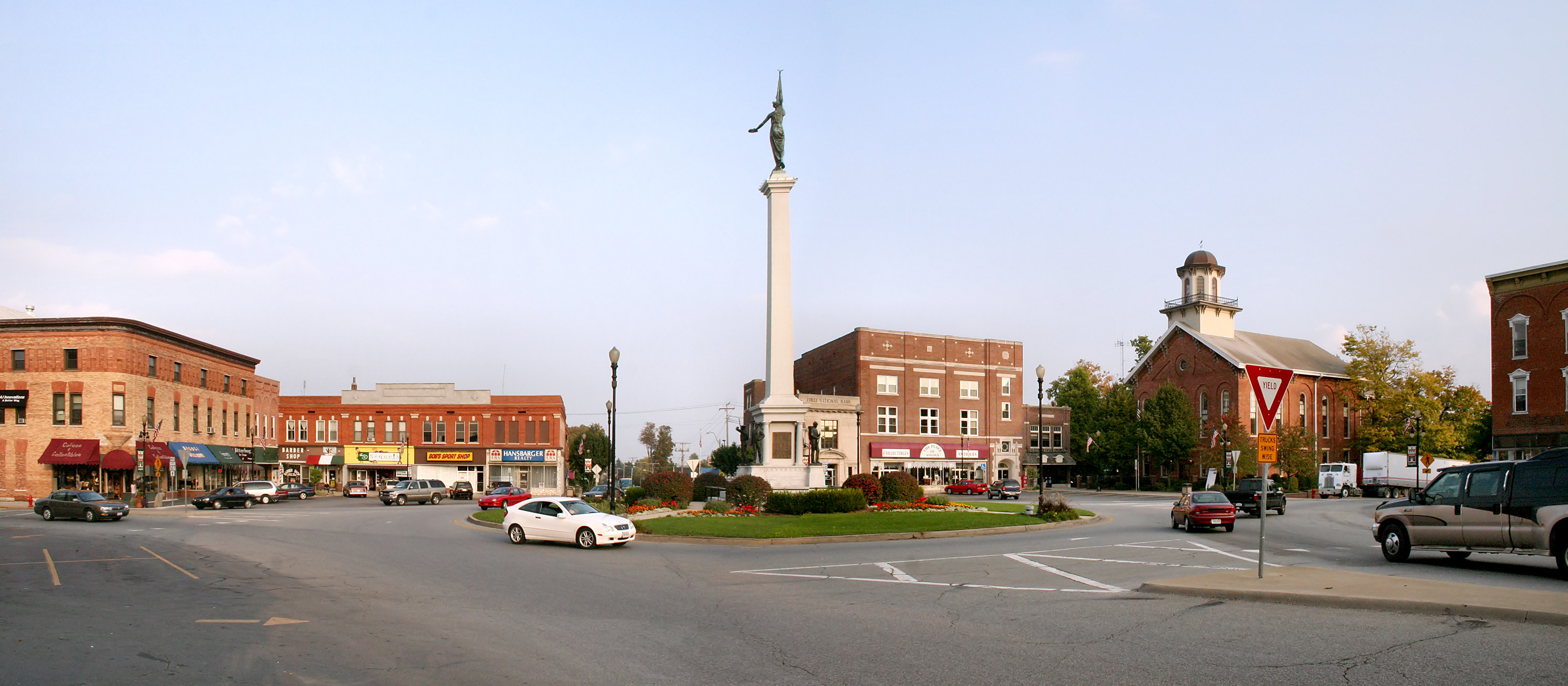
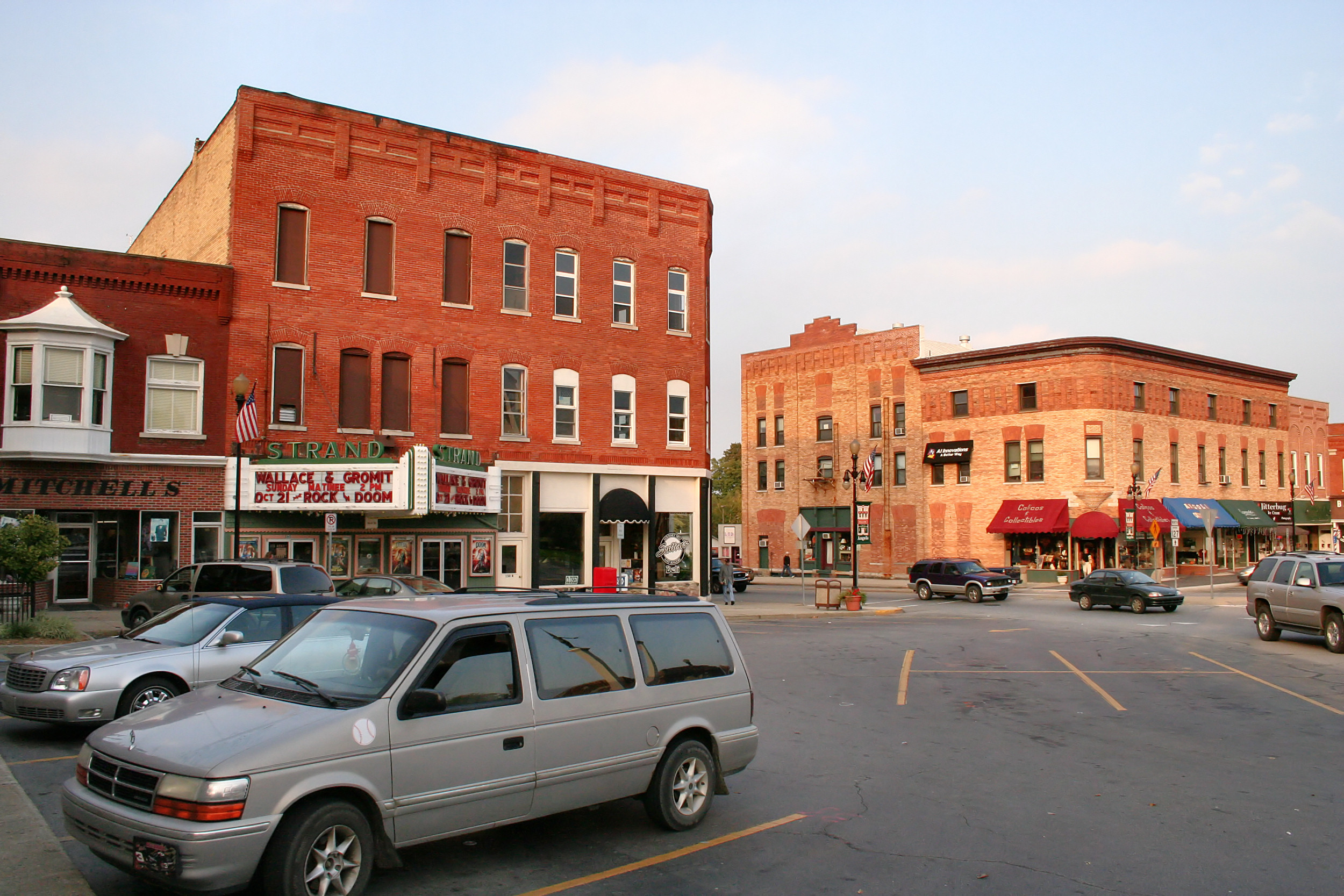
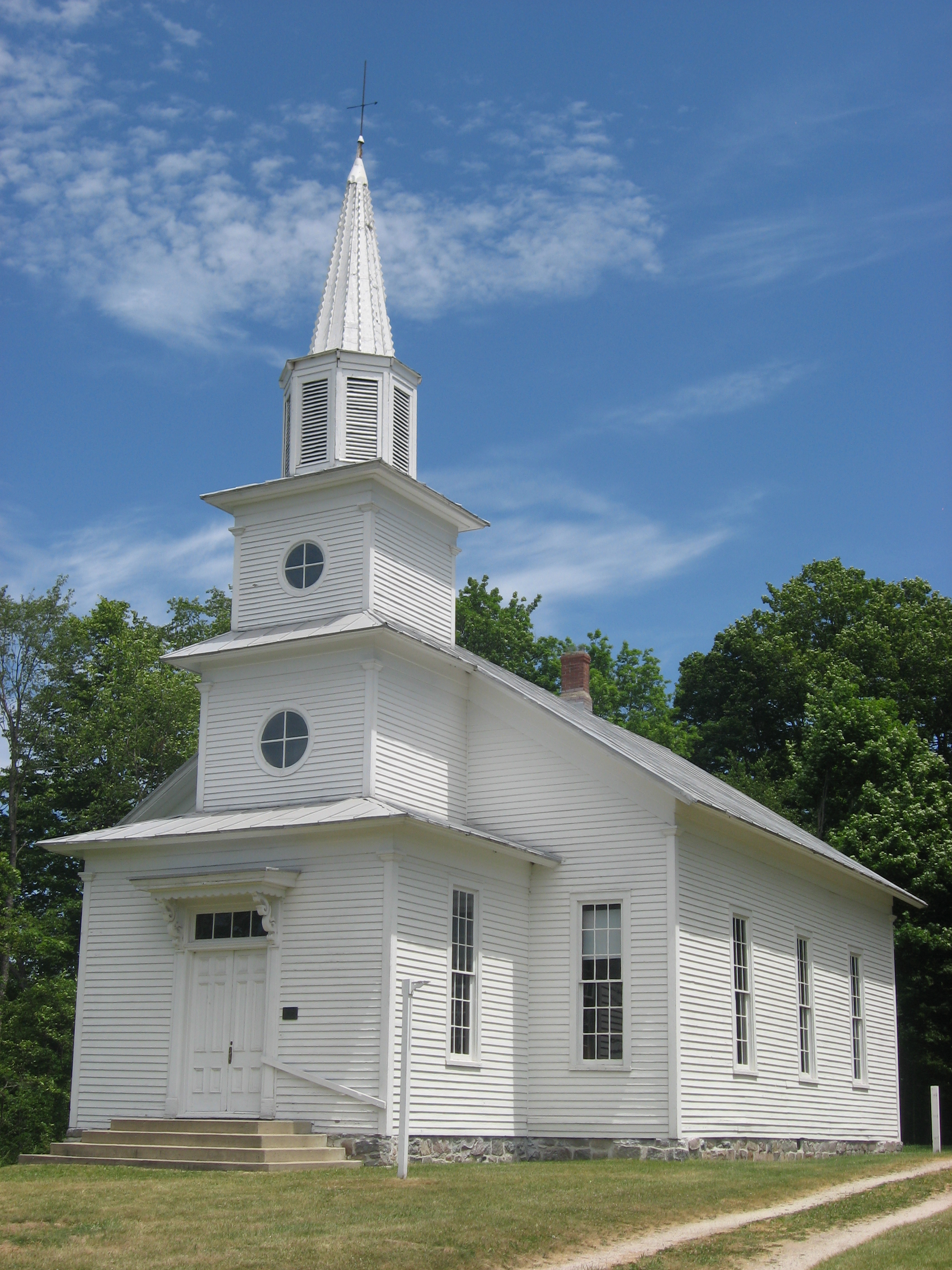
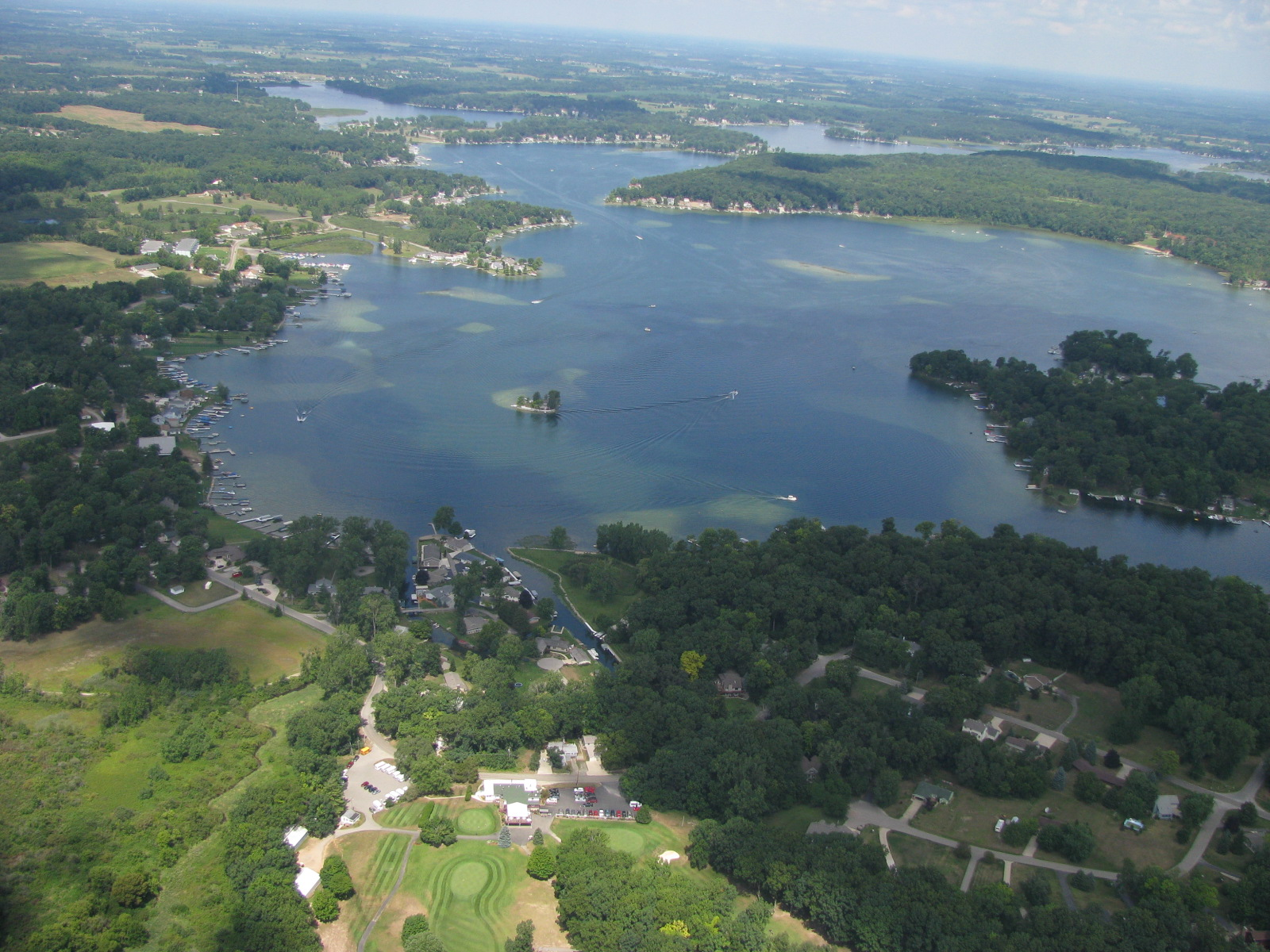
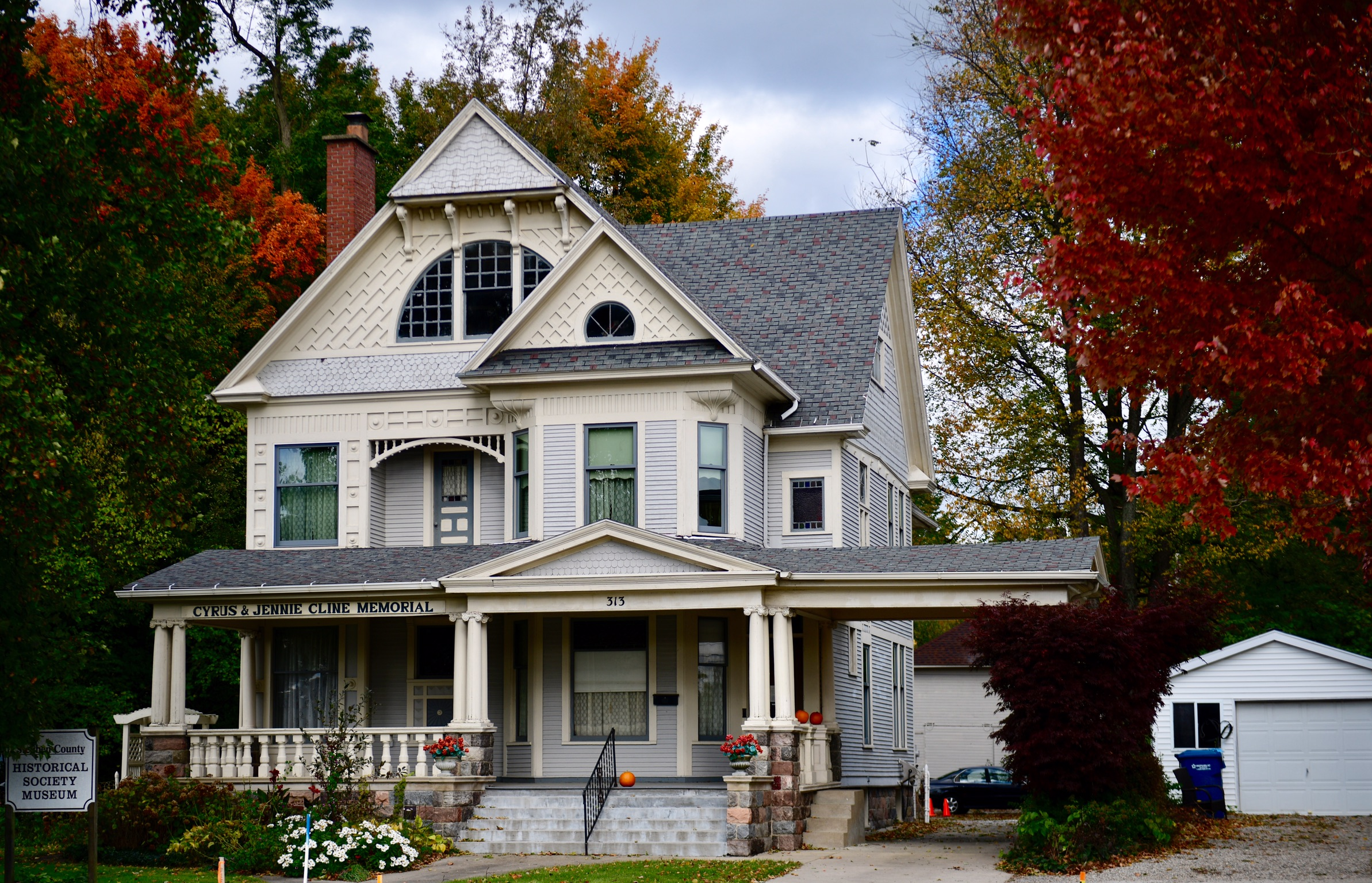
- Downtown Angola's traffic circle Historic Theater Powers Church Lake James Cyrus and Jennie Cline House
- Motto: "Proud of our past. Planning for our future."
- Location of Angola in Steuben County, Indiana.

- Location within Indiana Location within the United States Location within North America
- Coordinates: 41°38′13″N 85°00′05″W
- Country: United States
- State: Indiana
- County: Steuben
- Township: Pleasant
- Founded: 1838
- Incorporated (town): October 1, 1866
- Incorporated (city): 1906

Government
  - Mayor: Dave Martin (R)

Area
  - Total: 6.54 sq mi (16.94 km^{2})
  - Land: 6.49 sq mi (16.82 km^{2})
  - Water: 0.046 sq mi (0.12 km^{2})
- Elevation: 1,037 ft (316 m)

Population (2020)
  - Total: 9,340
  - Density: 1,438.6/sq mi (555.45/km^{2})
- Time zone: UTC-5 (EST)
  - Summer (DST): UTC-4 (EDT)
- ZIP code: 46703
- Area code: 260
- FIPS code: 18-01666
- GNIS ID: 2393958
- Website: www.angolain.org

Angola is a city in Pleasant Township, Steuben County, Indiana, United States. The population was 9,340 at the 2020 census. The city is the county seat of Steuben County. Angola was founded by Thomas Gale and Cornelius Gilmore on June 28, 1838, and is home to Trine University. The town is served by I-69 and the Indiana Toll Road (I-80 and I-90).

== History ==
Angola was founded in 1838 as the seat of Steuben County; the Angola post office has been in operation since the same year. Angola was officially incorporated as a town on October 1, 1866, and became a city in 1906.

Some of the first settlers came from Angola, New York, and they named their new home after their old one.

The Angola Commercial Historic District, Steuben County Courthouse, and Steuben County Jail are listed on the National Register of Historic Places.

Newell LeRoy Sims, a professional sociologist who lived for years in Angola published an in-depth study of the town in 1912 as his PhD dissertation at Columbia University in New York. He used the name "Aton" for the village. A Hoosier village: a sociological study with special reference to social causation (1912) is available online.

== Geography ==
The center of Angola is located at the intersection of U.S. 20 and State Road 127. The roads are known to the citizens of Angola as North and South Wayne street and West and East Maumee street.

According to the 2010 census, Angola has a total area of 6.387 square miles (16.54 km^{2}), of which 6.34 square miles (16.42 km^{2}) (or 99.26%) is land and 0.047 square miles (0.12 km^{2}) (or 0.74%) is water.

=== Climate ===
The National Weather Service reports that Angola's average January temperatures are a maximum of 30.5 °F (−0.8 °C) and a minimum of 16.0 °F (−8.9 °C). Average July temperatures are a maximum of 81.8 °F (27.7 °C) and a minimum of 61.2 °F (16.2 °C). There is an average of 7.5 days with highs of 90 °F (32 °C) or higher. There is an average of 28.1 days with highs of 32 °F (0 °C) or lower and an average of 2.3 days with lows of 0 °F (−18 °C) or lower. The record high temperature was 106 °F (41 °C) on July 13, 1936. The record low temperature was −27 °F (−33 °C) on January 4, 1981.

The average annual precipitation is 38.78 inches (985 mm). There is an average of 128.5 days with measurable precipitation. The wettest year was 1950, with 52.48 inches (1,333 mm) and the driest was 1971, with 24.07 inches (611 mm). The most precipitation in one month was 12.23 inches (311 mm) in May 1943. The most precipitation in a 24-hour period was 5.00 inches (127 mm) on July 9, 1951.

The average annual snowfall is 38.9 inches (990 mm). There are an average of 26.1 days with measurable snowfall. The snowiest season was 1981–82 with 74.9 inches (1,900 mm). The most snowfall in one month was 31.5 inches (800 mm) in January 1999, including the record 24-hour snowfall of 14.3 inches (360 mm) on January 3, 1999.

Climate data for Angola, Indiana (1991–2020 normals, extremes 1898–1907, 1920–present)
Month	Jan	Feb	Mar	Apr	May	Jun	Jul	Aug	Sep	Oct	Nov	Dec	Year
Record high °F (°C)	67 (19)	71 (22)	85 (29)	88 (31)	93 (34)	102 (39)	106 (41)	102 (39)	101 (38)	97 (36)	83 (28)	71 (22)	106 (41)
Mean maximum °F (°C)	52.8 (11.6)	55.0 (12.8)	67.7 (19.8)	77.8 (25.4)	84.9 (29.4)	90.6 (32.6)	90.8 (32.7)	89.7 (32.1)	86.8 (30.4)	79.4 (26.3)	65.5 (18.6)	55.4 (13.0)	92.9 (33.8)
Mean daily maximum °F (°C)	30.5 (−0.8)	33.9 (1.1)	44.8 (7.1)	57.7 (14.3)	69.4 (20.8)	78.4 (25.8)	81.8 (27.7)	80.0 (26.7)	73.6 (23.1)	60.9 (16.1)	47.1 (8.4)	35.7 (2.1)	57.8 (14.3)
Daily mean °F (°C)	23.3 (−4.8)	25.6 (−3.6)	35.1 (1.7)	46.8 (8.2)	58.6 (14.8)	68.1 (20.1)	71.5 (21.9)	69.7 (20.9)	62.4 (16.9)	50.7 (10.4)	38.8 (3.8)	28.9 (−1.7)	48.3 (9.1)
Mean daily minimum °F (°C)	16.0 (−8.9)	17.2 (−8.2)	25.5 (−3.6)	36.0 (2.2)	47.8 (8.8)	57.8 (14.3)	61.2 (16.2)	59.3 (15.2)	51.2 (10.7)	40.4 (4.7)	30.4 (−0.9)	22.2 (−5.4)	38.7 (3.7)
Mean minimum °F (°C)	−5.8 (−21.0)	−1.4 (−18.6)	7.7 (−13.5)	21.6 (−5.8)	32.6 (0.3)	43.9 (6.6)	49.8 (9.9)	48.2 (9.0)	38.0 (3.3)	27.0 (−2.8)	15.8 (−9.0)	3.6 (−15.8)	−9.2 (−22.9)
Record low °F (°C)	−27 (−33)	−23 (−31)	−13 (−25)	4 (−16)	22 (−6)	32 (0)	40 (4)	37 (3)	27 (−3)	16 (−9)	−4 (−20)	−19 (−28)	−27 (−33)
Average precipitation inches (mm)	2.57 (65)	2.31 (59)	2.49 (63)	3.59 (91)	4.39 (112)	4.08 (104)	3.79 (96)	3.93 (100)	3.17 (81)	2.95 (75)	3.00 (76)	2.51 (64)	38.78 (985)
Average snowfall inches (cm)	11.8 (30)	10.3 (26)	5.3 (13)	1.0 (2.5)	0.0 (0.0)	0.0 (0.0)	0.0 (0.0)	0.0 (0.0)	0.0 (0.0)	0.1 (0.25)	2.3 (5.8)	8.1 (21)	38.9 (99)
Average precipitation days (≥ 0.01 in)	13.0	10.5	10.8	11.7	11.7	10.8	9.1	9.1	8.3	10.5	10.8	12.2	128.5
Average snowy days (≥ 0.1 in)	7.7	6.6	3.0	0.9	0.0	0.0	0.0	0.0	0.0	0.0	2.1	5.8	26.1
Source: NOAA

== Demographics ==
=== 2020 census ===
As of the 2020 census, Angola had a population of 9,340. The median age was 29.8 years. 19.1% of residents were under the age of 18 and 15.3% of residents were 65 years of age or older. For every 100 females there were 105.0 males, and for every 100 females age 18 and over there were 105.2 males age 18 and over.

99.0% of residents lived in urban areas, while 1.0% lived in rural areas.

There were 3,378 households in Angola, of which 26.8% had children under the age of 18 living in them. Of all households, 35.3% were married-couple households, 23.3% were households with a male householder and no spouse or partner present, and 32.9% were households with a female householder and no spouse or partner present. About 37.7% of all households were made up of individuals and 15.0% had someone living alone who was 65 years of age or older.

There were 3,691 housing units, of which 8.5% were vacant. The homeowner vacancy rate was 1.1% and the rental vacancy rate was 9.4%.

Racial composition as of the 2020 census
Race	Number	Percent
White	8,137	87.1%
Black or African American	153	1.6%
American Indian and Alaska Native	53	0.6%
Asian	114	1.2%
Native Hawaiian and Other Pacific Islander	0	0.0%
Some other race	377	4.0%
Two or more races	506	5.4%
Hispanic or Latino (of any race)	757	8.1%

=== 2010 census ===
Historical population
Census	Pop.	Note	%±
1850	226		—
1870	1,072		—
1880	1,280		19.4%
1890	1,840		43.8%
1900	2,141		16.4%
1910	2,610		21.9%
1920	2,650		1.5%
1930	2,665		0.6%
1940	3,141		17.9%
1950	5,081		61.8%
1960	4,746		−6.6%
1970	5,117		7.8%
1980	5,486		7.2%
1990	5,824		6.2%
2000	7,344		26.1%
2010	8,612		17.3%
2020	9,340		8.5%
U.S. Decennial Census

As of the 2010 census, there were 8,612 people, 3,111 households, and 1,815 families living in the city. The population density was 1,358.4 inhabitants per square mile (524.5/km^{2}). There were 3,499 housing units at an average density of 551.9 per square mile (213.1/km^{2}). The racial makeup of the city was 93.6% White, 1.4% African American, 0.3% Native American, 0.8% Asian, 0.1% Pacific Islander, 2.1% from other races, and 1.7% from two or more races. Hispanic or Latino of any race were 6.3% of the population.

There were 3,111 households, of which 32.0% had children under the age of 18 living with them, 38.7% were married couples living together, 14.3% had a female householder with no husband present, 5.4% had a male householder with no wife present, and 41.7% were non-families. 33.1% of all households were made up of individuals, and 12.2% had someone living alone who was 65 years of age or older. The average household size was 2.35 and the average family size was 2.99.

The median age in the city was 30.3 years. 22.1% of residents were under the age of 18; 21.2% were between the ages of 18 and 24; 24% were from 25 to 44; 19.6% were from 45 to 64; and 13% were 65 years of age or older. The gender makeup of the city was 50.6% male and 49.4% female.

=== 2000 census ===
As of the 2000 census, there were 7,344 people, 2,769 households, and 1,578 families living in the city. The population density was 1,736.4 inhabitants per square mile (670.4/km^{2}). There were 3,012 housing units at an average density of 712.1 per square mile (274.9/km^{2}). The racial makeup of the city was 94.00% White, 0.82% African American, 0.44% Native American, 1.23% Asian, 0.04% Pacific Islander, 1.92% from other races, and 1.57% from two or more races. Hispanic or Latino of any race were 3.89% of the population.

There were 2,769 households, out of which 30.4% had children under the age of 18 living with them, 41.0% were married couples living together, 11.8% had a female householder with no husband present, and 43.0% were non-families. 34.2% of all households were made up of individuals, and 13.5% had someone living alone who was 65 years of age or older. The average household size was 2.32 and the average family size was 2.99.

In the city, the population was spread out, with 22.7% under the age of 18, 20.7% from 18 to 24, 26.7% from 25 to 44, 17.0% from 45 to 64, and 12.9% who were 65 years of age or older. The median age was 29 years. For every 100 females, there were 105.8 males. For every 100 females age 18 and over, there were 107.3 males.

The median income for a household in the city was $34,925, and the median income for a family was $43,848. Males had a median income of $32,031 versus $23,258 for females. The per capita income for the city was $16,750. About 8.1% of families and 10.5% of the population were below the poverty line, including 6.5% of those under age 18 and 13.2% of those age 65 or over.

== Media ==
=== Radio stations ===
- 100.3 WLKI-FM wlki
- 92.7 HOT FM 92.7
- 101.3 U-Rock

=== Television stations ===
- 63 WINM

WINM is a religious broadcaster and has slight viewership. Angola gets its main broadcast channels from Fort Wayne

=== Newspapers ===
The Herald Republican, the daily newspaper based in Angola and serving Steuben County, was formed through the merger of two longstanding weekly newspapers in Angola, the Steuben Republican (first published in May 1857) and The Angola Herald (January 1876). The newspapers consolidated their printing plants in 1925 and their ownership in the 1960s (in the Willis family), eventually merging into one publication in 1980. Two years later they were sold to Home News Enterprises, which expanded the paper to a twice-weekly format in 1989, and then in August 2001 to KPC Media Group of Kendallville, Indiana, which converted The Herald Republican to a daily in September 2001.

== Transportation ==
Angola is served by Barons Bus Lines Schedule 0025: Cleveland, Ohio to Chicago, Illinois; and Schedule 0026: Chicago, Illinois to Cleveland, Ohio. Both routes feature local service via primarily US Route 20. These routes are an essential transportation service sharing similarities to that of the Essential Air Service, primarily funded by tax payers.

== Education ==
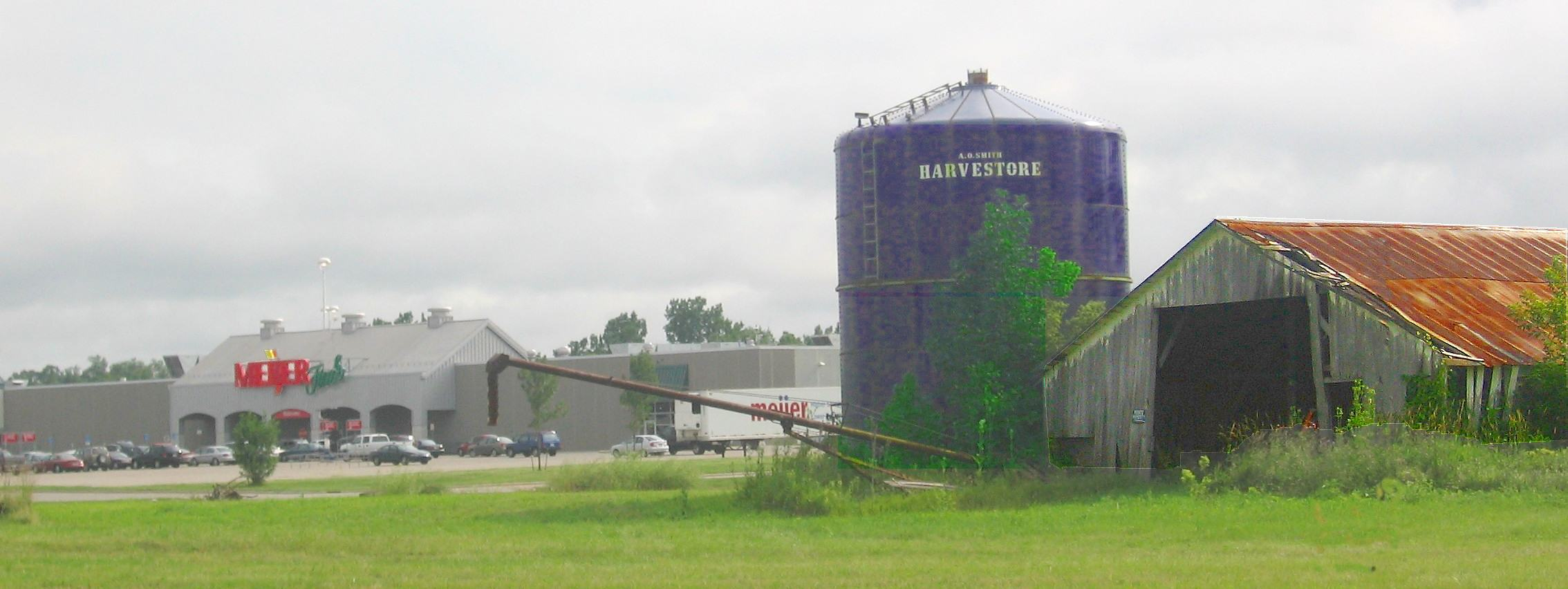
Just north of Angola, on State Road 127, the rural past has made way for big-box stores.

The Metropolitan School District of Steuben County, which operates the following schools in Angola:

- Carlin Park Elementary
- Hendry Park Elementary
- Ryan Park Elementary
- Pleasant Lake Elementary
- Angola Middle School
- Angola High School
- Educational Opportunity Center

Trine University

Angola has a lending library: the Carnegie Public Library of Steuben Co.

== Notable people ==
- Lloy Ball, Olympic volleyball gold medalist
- John Barnes, science-fiction writer
- Hagood Hardy, 1937–1997, Canadian-American jazz musician and composer
- Lewis Blaine Hershey, 1893–1977, U.S. Army four-star general, second Director of the Selective Service
- Lois Irene Marshall, 1873–1958, wife of U.S. Vice President Thomas R. Marshall
- Edward Ralph May, 1819–1852, the only member of the Indiana Constitutional Convention of 1850 to vote for African American suffrage, practiced law in Angola from 1843 to 1852
- Wilbur Simpson, classical bassoonist
- Raymond E. Willis, U.S. Senator
- J. Walter Yeagley, former judge of the District of Columbia Court of Appeals

== See also ==
- Fun Spot Park
