= Indiana Northeastern Railroad =

Railway line in the United States of America

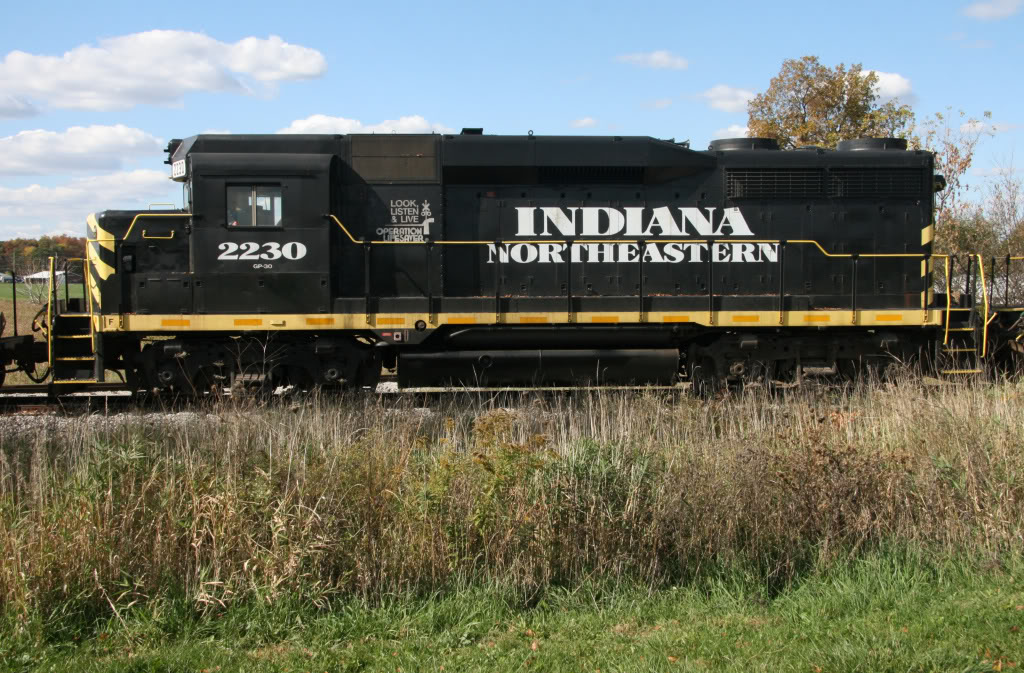
- Indiana Northeastern Railroad locomotive no. 2230. EMD GP30. Ex-Pennsylvania Railroad. Built April 1963.

Overview
- Headquarters: Hillsdale, Michigan
- Reporting mark: IN
- Locale: Indiana, Michigan, Ohio
- Dates of operation: 1992–present
- Predecessor: Hillsdale County Railway, Pigeon River Railroad

Technical
- Track gauge: 4 ft 8 1/2 in (1,435 mm) standard gauge
- Length: 130 miles (210 km)

Other
- Website: inerailroad.com

The Indiana Northeastern Railroad (reporting mark IN) is a Class III short line freight railroad operating on nearly 130 miles (210 km) in southern lower Michigan, northeast Indiana and northwest Ohio. The Indiana Northeastern Railroad Company began operations in December 1992 and is an independent privately owned company. As of 2017, the railroad has hauled more than 7,000 carloads per year. Commodities moved by the railroad include corn, soybeans, wheat and flour. It also handles plastics, fiberboard, aluminum, copper, coal, perlite, stone, lumber, glass, rendering products, as well as agricultural fertilizers and chemicals.

== Routes ==
Indiana Northeastern routes consist of approximately 70 miles in Michigan, 44 miles in Indiana and 9 miles in Ohio. From its headquarters and operational hub in the city of Hillsdale, Michigan, in Hillsdale County, Indiana's northernmost route runs northwest into Jonesville, Michigan, and then predominantly west into Branch County through Quincy to a terminus at Coldwater, Michigan. IN also has a 7-mile branch line from Jonesville to Litchfield, Michigan. The tracks IN operates on between Quincy and Coldwater are owned by the Branch County Rail Users Association (RUA). The Little River Railroad also operates steam excursions on the route between Coldwater and Quincy.

IN's route south of Hillsdale heads southwest through unincorporated Bankers, Michigan and through Reading, Montgomery and Ray. Where it enters Steuben County, Indiana and proceeds through Fremont, Angola, Pleasant Lake and into Steubenville, Indiana where it junctions with IN's southernmost east–west route. All of the trackage IN operates on in Michigan is owned by the State of Michigan with the exception of the portion owned by the RUA.

The southernmost route of IN trackage heads east from South Milford in LaGrange County, Indiana into Stuben County through Helmer, Hudson and Ashley, Indiana. Then proceeds through the junction at Stubenville and on through Hamilton before entering Williams County, Ohio. It then passes through the Village of Edon before arriving at Montpelier, Ohio where it interchanges its traffic with the Norfolk Southern Railway on its Detroit to Fort Wayne line.

=== Former route ===
In 2004, IN purchased a 19-mile segment of track from RUA from Coldwater West to Sturgis, Michigan where it would maintain an interchange with the Michigan Southern Railroad. Due to a lack of traffic IN applied to abandon this line in 2012.

== History ==
=== Lake Shore and Michigan Southern Railway ===
The Indiana Northeastern Railroad's oldest existing line from Hillsdale to Coldwater dates back to the 1830s when the state of Michigan began planning a railroad between Monroe, Michigan and Chicago. Rails reached Hillsdale from the east in 1843. The state of Michigan sold the line in 1846 and it became the Michigan Southern Rail Road. Construction of the line continued west of Hillsdale and by 1852 it became part of a line to Chicago through Coldwater and Sturgis, Michigan. This line would eventually become unofficially known as "The Old Road" and in 1869 came under the Lake Shore and Michigan Southern Railway (LS&MS) when the Michigan Southern Rail Road and the Lake Shore Railway merged that year.

IN's connection from Hillsdale to the unincorporated area of Bankers was originally built as the Detroit, Hillsdale and Indiana Rail Road in 1871. A line that ran from Bankers to Ypsilanti. The line was also acquired by the Lake Shore and Michigan Southern in 1881. The trackage was eventually abandoned northeast of Hillsdale.

IN's north–south route from Bankers to Stubenville, Indiana started as the Fort Wayne, Jackson and Saginaw Railroad in 1870. The route was intended to compete for northbound traffic from Fort Wayne, Indiana. It was also acquired by the LS&MS in 1882. The tracks south of Stubenville were eventually abandoned. IN's seven-mile branch north to Litchfield was part of the Northern Central Michigan Railroad as a route north from Jonesville to Lansing. It was acquired soon after the company began operation by LS&MS in 1897. The tracks immediately north of Litchfield were abandoned.

By 1914, the LS&MS was formally merged with the New York Central & Hudson River Railroad and a number of other leased railroads including the nearby Michigan Central Railroad to create the New York Central Railroad (NYC). New York Central would operate these former LS&MS lines as its Toledo Division.

=== Wabash Railroad 4th District ===
Indiana Northeastern's southernmost route from South Milford, Indiana to its interchange point with the Norfolk Southern Railway in Montpelier, Ohio was originally built by the Wabash Railroad in 1892 and 1893. The line originally known as its "Chicago Extension" ran from a junction with Wabash's Detroit to Fort Wayne line in Montpelier directly west to Gary, Indiana terminating at a junction known as Clark Junction. At the junction Wabash trains would then run over the Baltimore and Ohio Chicago Terminal and Chicago and Western Indiana switching and terminal railroads to connect with the Chicago area rail network and Wabash's own Chicago rail yards. The line would eventually be designated as Wabash's 4th District and became part of the shortest route for trains between Detroit and Chicago. A connection from Montpelier to Toledo, Ohio would also be added after 1900. The 4th District would become the first Wabash district to be dieselized (operating with diesel locomotives instead of steam) in 1950 and the last rail line in Indiana to operate mixed trains in 1962. Wabash would continue to operate the line until the railroad was acquired by the Norfolk and Western Railway (N&W), through lease in 1964 and full ownership in 1970. N&W would designate the line as its Gary District and continue to operate it until the 1980s.

The line lost its through-train passenger service in the 1930s when the Pennsylvania Railroad wanted to compete in the Chicago – Detroit passenger market. The two railroads reached an agreement to run trains on the PRR between Chicago and Ft. Wayne, IN and then switch to the Wabash trackage for the Ft. Wayne to Detroit portion of the trip. This eliminated the necessity of the Montpelier, OH to Chicago, IL portion of the line.

=== Hillsdale County Railway ===
On 1 February 1968, the New York Central Railroad and Pennsylvania Railroad formally merged creating the Penn Central railroad. Which would mean all the former LS&MS NYC lines would be owned and operated by Penn Central.

Penn Central's bankruptcy in 1970 and the dire financial condition of other Northeast and Midwest railroads prompted the federal government to enact legislation creating Conrail in 1976. Conrail would take over the rail operations of the financially struggling carriers and merge them into a new rail system. However, the Penn Central routes in Hillsdale County, west to Quincy in Branch County and south to Stubenville, Indiana would not be included in the new Conrail system.

The State of Michigan, faced with the abandonment of 200 miles of track when Penn Central would cease rail operations, stepped in and create a subsidy program to continue rail service on Michigan trackage that would not be acquired by Conrail. With the assistance of the subsidies the Hillsdale County Railway Company (HCRC) was incorporated on January 27, 1976, and began operations on 1 April 1976, on the former Penn Central routes in Hillsdale County, west to Quincy and south to Stubenville. The company started with routes approximately 60 miles in length and it acquired a handful of first-generation EMD diesel locomotives. The new railway could interchange traffic with Conrail at Quincy and with the Norfolk and Western Railway at Stubenville.

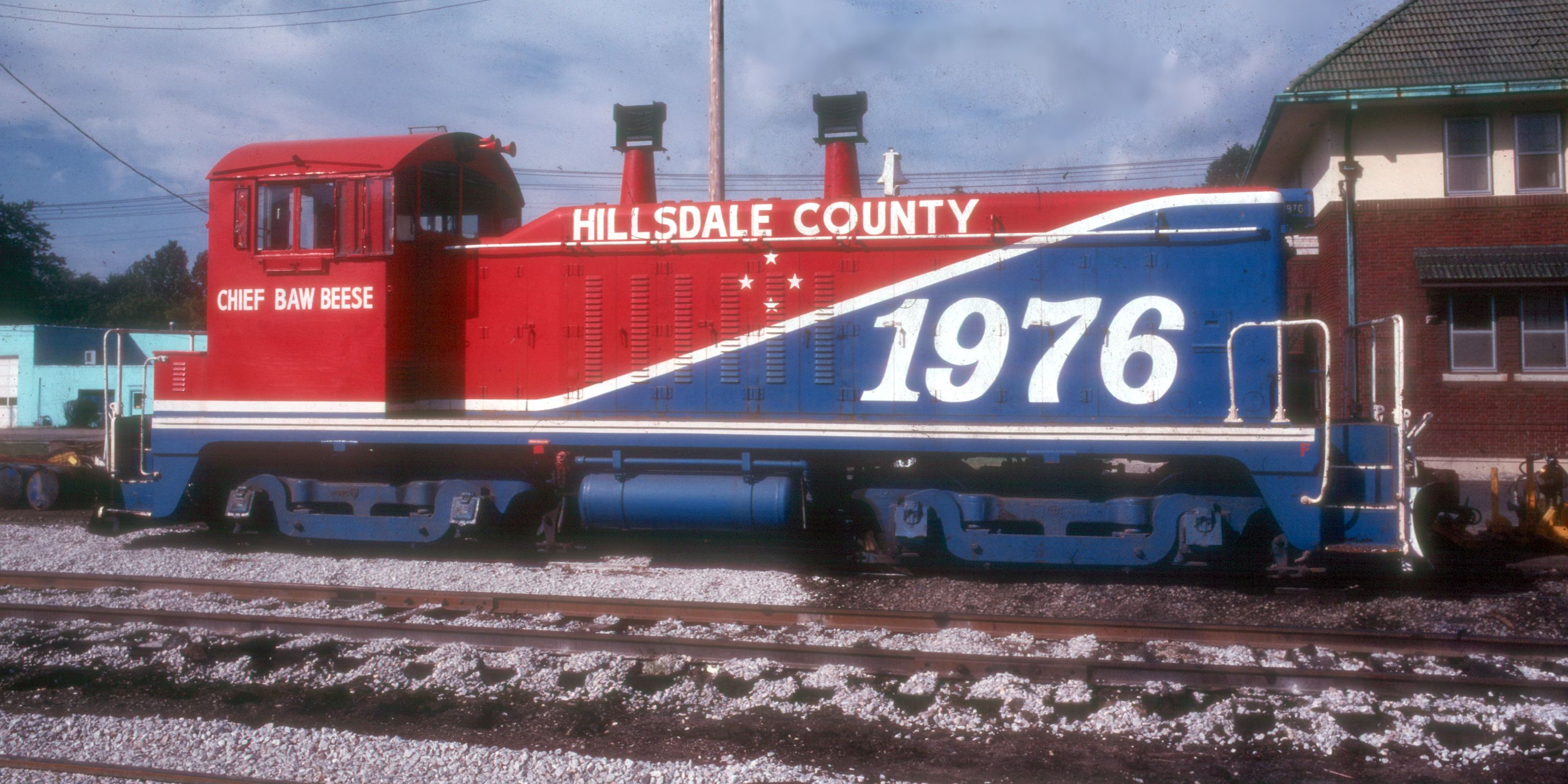
Hillsdale County Railway EMD NW2 locomotive in 1978

Hillsdale County Railway's locomotive-paint scheme was partially similar to the Reading Company's green and yellow scheme. The railway would also join the ranks of other US railroads in 1976 who painted at least one locomotive in a special scheme to commemorate the United States Bicentennial. Its NW2 switching locomotive was numbered 1976 and painted red and blue divided by a white stripe. It was also named Chief Baw Beese after Baw Beese, the early nineteenth-century chief of a Huron Band of Potawotami Native Americans that lived in what became Hillsdale County.

In November 1976 the State of Michigan expanded its support of rail service by enacting the State Transportation Preservation Act of 1976 (Act 295 of 1976). This further authorized the Michigan Department of State Highways and Transportation (now MDOT) to purchase Michigan rail lines in jeopardy of abandonment and contract with a rail carrier to be the designated operator of the lines the state acquired. The state purchased from the Penn Central Corporation the tracks that the Hillsdale County Railway was operating on within Michigan and HCRC would be the designated operator.

By the mid-1980s, Conrail sought abandonment of its less profitable lines including the former LS&MS "Old Road" line from Quincy to White Pigeon, Michigan. At the same time N&W was in the process of abandoning its Gary District between Montpelier, Ohio and Gary, Indiana. Threatened with potentially losing its rail interchanges, HCRC extended operations on a three-mile section of underused track between Pleasant Lake and Stubenville, Indiana. In April 1986 HCRC purchased an almost 25-mile segment from N&W between Ashley, Indiana through Stubenville to a rail connection with N&W's Detroit - Fort Wayne line near Montpelier, Ohio.

The non-profit Branch and St Joseph County County Rail Users Association (RUA) was formed by the city of Coldwater and local business interests to purchase a 30-mile segment between Quincy and Sturgis from Conrail in 1989. RUA contracted with HCRC to operate and maintain over ten miles of the line between Quincy and Coldwater. A new separate short line railroad, the Michigan Southern Railroad, was contracted operate from Coldwater to Sturgis.

=== Pigeon River Railroad ===
In 1980 the Staggers Rail Act was enacted by the federal government which deregulated the United States railroad industry. The legislation made it easier for railroads to set rates, negotiate shipping contracts, seek abandonment of unprofitable routes and get merger approval. Within two years in 1982 the Norfolk and Western Railway and the Southern Railway created the Norfolk Southern Corporation; both railways would be completely merged by 1990. N&W also began to rationalize its routes and in 1983 began abandonment of segments of its Gary District in favor of its route from Detroit to Chicago through Fort Wayne.

The owners of the South Milford Grain Company, a grain elevator business, in South Milford on N&W's Gary District feared that losing rail service would be financially detrimental to their business. In order to preserve their rail connection the grain company acquired an over 15 mile section of the N&W from Wolcottville, Indiana through South Milford to Ashley and created the Pigeon River Railroad (PGRV). The new shortline railroad began operating in November 1985 with a former Detroit and Toledo Shore Line GP7 locomotive. Eastbound PGRV trains from South Milford transferred onto the Hillsdale County Railway at Ashley to interchange with Norfolk Southern in Montpelier. By 1991 PGVR abandoned most of its 5-mile section between South Milford and Wolcottville.

=== Indiana Northeastern Railroad ===
In the early 1990s the Hillsdale County Railway was heavily in debt. Its trackage was suffering from deferred maintenance and derailments were becoming a common occurrence. Then, in 1992, a 50-car eastbound unit train from South Milford hauled by HCRC derailed near Hamilton, Indiana costing the South Milford Grain Company $30,000. The grain elevator company's owners decided to assume HCRC's $1 million in debt and it acquired the railway. The grain company then created the Indiana Northeastern Railroad Company to take over the rail operations of the HCRC and its Pigeon River Railroad on 22 December 1992. The IN immediately began to repair and rebuild trackage, spending $3 million on track improvements within its first two years of operation. In 1994, the railroad gained back on-line customers that had turned to trucking and by 1996 the railroad was hauling 3,400 carloads a year of grain, flour, sugar, food products, fertilizer, plastic and other commodities. Since it began the IN has continued to spend millions of dollars to upgrade its tracks with roadbed, rail, bridge and grade crossing improvements which enables the railroad to haul heavier trains at higher speeds.

The RUA sold its more than 19 mile long Coldwater to Sturgis segment to Indiana Northeastern in 2004. In 2012 IN applied to abandon this segment due to an absence of traffic. Upon abandonment it was anticipated that the route would become a rail trail however, local opposition led to the abandoned segment being deeded to the adjoining property owners.

IN also continued to supplement the diesel locomotive fleet it acquired from HCRC with rebuilt second generation EMD locomotives. In 2012 the railroad opened a new $1.6 million locomotive maintenance facility in Hudson, Indiana. The facility includes three tracks, two that extend inside the facility, a lighted service pit, a 25-ton crane and other equipment to service locomotives and railcars. In 2013, Indiana Northeastern Railroad abandoned the line between Coldwater and Sturgis in Michigan.

Indiana Northeastern celebrated its 25th year in operation in 2017. Through numerous track rehabilitation projects over its nearly 130 miles of routes and careful management of its resources, the railroad has reportedly continued to operate reliably. Since 2022, Nickel Plate Road 765 has visited the railroad to pull the Indiana Rail Experience excursions on their trackage as part of a multi-year long partnership with the Fort Wayne Railroad Historical Society.

== Motive Power ==
Indiana Northeastern's locomotive fleet consists of first and second generation road-switcher diesels all built by Electro-Motive Division (EMD). All locomotives have had previous owners and most were originally built for large Class 1 railroads. Some came from the acquisition of the Hillsdale County Railway and others were acquired through rail service and leasing companies like the Indiana Boxcar Corporation (IBCX).The railroad purchased its first two six-axle locomotives from Motive Power Resources in 2017. IN planned to pair one six-axle locomotive with a four-axle unit to move the grain trains. Indiana Northeastern general manager, Troy Strane told Trains Magazine he believed one of the new six-axle locomotives could do the work equal to two or three of the railroad's four-axle locomotives.

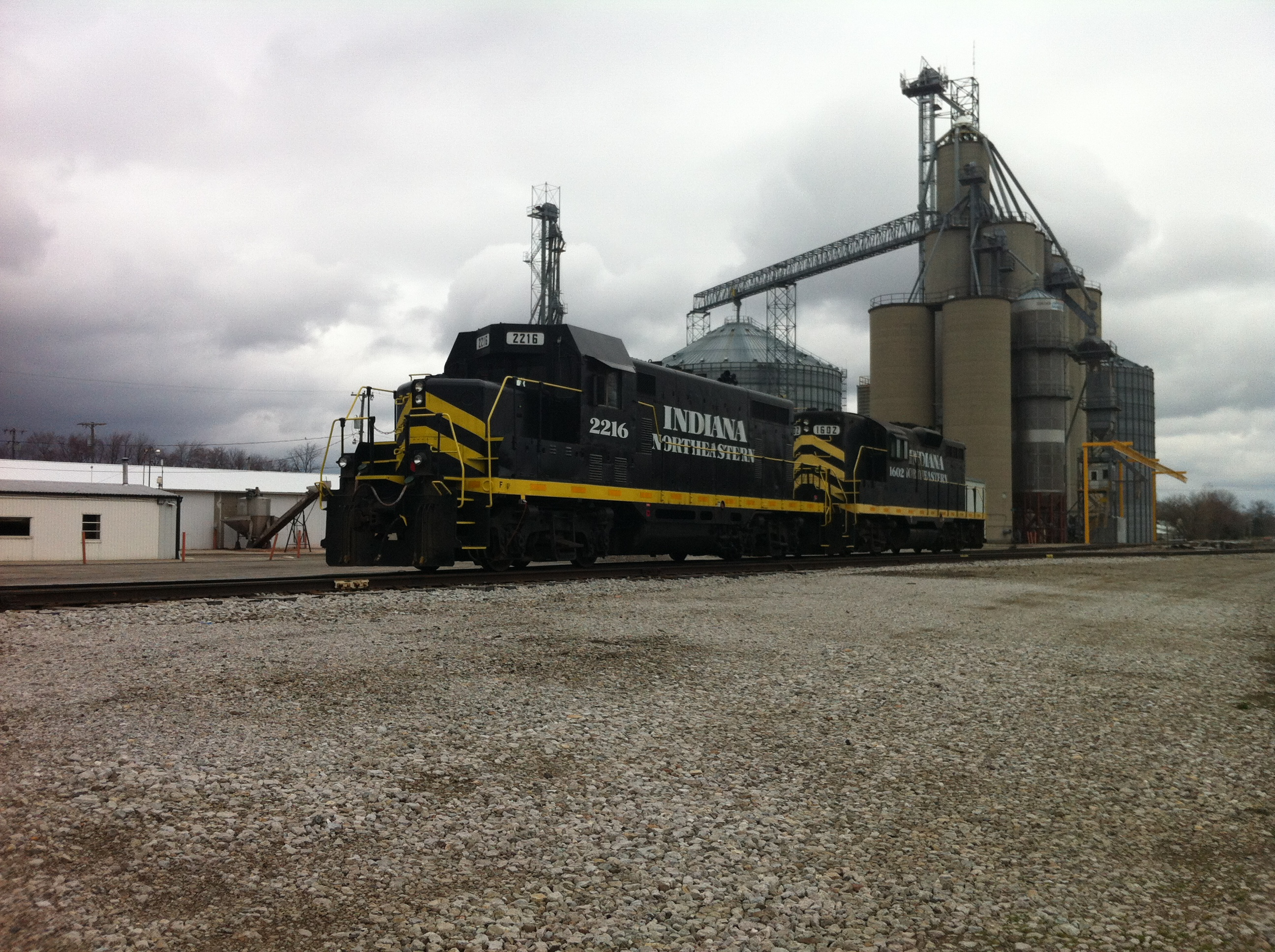
Indiana Northeastern GP7u number 2216 a rebuilt EMD GP7 and GP7 1602 await their next assignment at the Edon Farmers CO-OP in Edon, Ohio

IN's locomotive paint scheme is reminiscent of the Detroit and Toledo Shore Line's (DTSL) Nickel Plate Road influenced scheme from the 1950s. This was also the original paint scheme on IN's predecessor Pigeon River Railroad's only locomotive, former DTSL GP7 number 47. The locomotives are painted completely black with three yellow point-up chevrons on both ends of the locomotive and a yellow stripe along the long side of the frame on each side. (Some locomotives only have two chevrons on their front nose.) The Indiana Northeastern name is painted white in billboard style in the center on each side of the long hood section. The lettering closely resembles a heavy bold Times New Roman style Serif font. The road numbers are also painted white in the same font and placed under the windows on both sides of the cab.

IN has also been running a former Denver and Rio Grande Western Railroad EMD GP40 rebuilt into a GP40-3 with its fleet. The locomotive, numbered DOTX 2000, is owned by the United States Department of Transportation and has been used as an equipment testbed. In 2017 it was painted into IN's paint scheme with "United States Department of Transportation" stenciled on sides of the long hood instead of the Indiana Northeastern name.

=== Locomotive roster ===
Locomotive details
Road Number	Model	Year built	Notes
1073	GP10	1956	Originally Illinois Central Railroad GP9 9167. Rebuilt into a low short hood GP10 at Illinois Central's Paducah shops. Formerly GWRX 1073, formerly MidSouth Rail 1073, formerly Gulf and Mississippi 8167, formerly Illinois Central Gulf 8167.
1601	GP7	1953	Originally Reading 614, previously Hillsdale County Railway 1601, former SJ&LC 614.
1602	GP9	1957	Second IN locomotive with 1602 road number. Originally Great Northern 693, previously Hillsdale County 1766, former Burlington Northern 1766.
1770	GP9	1957	A chop-nosed GP9. Originally Great Northern 697, previously Hillsdale County 1770, former Burlington Northern 1770.
2000	GP40-3	1966	Owned by the United States Department of Transportation, leased to IN as DOTX 2000. Originally Denver and Rio Grande Western GP40 3055. Previously Elecon Engineering (ELOX) 2000 and former OmniTRAX (OMLX) 3055, former Helm Financial (HATX) 3055, former MKRail 3055. Rebuilt into a GP40-3 by Illinois Central.
2185	GP30	1962	Originally Reading 3617 then 5517, previously LETX 2185, former Conrail 2185 .
2216	GP7u	1952	A chop-nosed GP7, originally Santa Fe 2746. Rebuilt at Santa Fe's Cleburne shops in 1980 and renumbered to 2216. Formerly number 1500 from the bankrupt Westmoreland Scenic Railroad. Arrived on IN in 2005 and is frequently kept in Reading, MI for switching work.
2230	GP30	1963	Originally Pennsylvania Railroad 2230. Previously LTEX 2230, formerly Conrail 2230, formerly Penn Central 2230.
3084	SD40-2	1966	First 6 axle purchased by IN. Originally built as Canadian Pacific Railway SD40 5527 Class DRF-30a. Rebuilt by Alstom Canada into an SD40-2 as GCFX 3084. Previously National Railway Equipment Company (NREX) 3084 and former CITX 3084.
3125	SD40M-2	1966	Originally Southern Pacific SD45 8831 then rebuilt as Southern Pacific SD45R 7049. Previously CEFX 3125 rebuilt to SD40-2 standards. Repainted into IN livery in June 2018.
5903	GP9H	1954	Originally built as Cincinnati Union Terminal 5903, previously Hillsdale County 1603, former Conrail 7303, former Penn Central 7303 and former New York Central 5903. Recently renumbered from 1603 and rebuilt for the railroad's 25th anniversary in 2017.
4670	SD70M		Former UP engine, acquired by the Indiana Northeastern in 2023
	SD70M		Former UP engine, acquired by the Indiana Northeastern in 2023

=== Out of service and former locomotives ===
Road Number	Model	Year built	Notes
47	GP7	1952	Originally Detroit and Toledo Shore Line Railroad 47, now Ohi-Rail 47. It was previously Pigeon River Railroad 47 and former Grand Trunk Western 6047. Retired with the arrival of IN 1500 and sold to IBCX.
1602	GP7	1952	Out of Service. First IN locomotive with 1602 road number. Originally Reading 606, previously Hillsdale County Railway 1602 "City of Hillsdale", former SJ&LC 606. Now stored out of service at South Milford, Indiana for a parts source.
4216	GP30M	1963	Out of Service. Originally C&O and Chessie System 3021, now ICBX 4216, previously CSX 4216. The unit has been used as a parts supply to maintain IN's other GP30s.
