= Otsego Township, Steuben County, Indiana =

Otsego Township
- Township
- Location in Steuben County
- Coordinates: 41°34′13″N 84°54′40″W
- Country: United States
- State: Indiana
- County: Steuben

Government
  - Type: Indiana township

Area
  - Total: 34.78 sq mi (90.1 km^{2})
  - Land: 33.54 sq mi (86.9 km^{2})
  - Water: 1.24 sq mi (3.2 km^{2}) 3.57%
- Elevation: 958 ft (292 m)

Population (2020)
  - Total: 2,466
  - Density: 76.8/sq mi (29.7/km^{2})
- Time zone: UTC-5 (Eastern (EST))
  - Summer (DST): UTC-4 (EDT)
- Area code: 260
- GNIS feature ID: 453697

Otsego Township is one of twelve townships in Steuben County, Indiana, United States. As of the 2020 census, its population was 2,466, down from 2,575 at 2010, and it contained 1,780 housing units.

== Geography ==
According to the 2010 census, the township has a total area of 34.78 square miles (90.1 km^{2}), of which 33.54 square miles (86.9 km^{2}) (or 96.43%) is land and 1.24 square miles (3.2 km^{2}) (or 3.57%) is water. Lakes in this township include Ball Lake, Fee Lake, Hamilton Lake, Jackson Lake, Johnson Lake and Round Lake. The stream of Black Creek runs through this township.

=== Cities and towns ===
- Hamilton (north three-quarters)

=== Unincorporated towns ===
- Clarks Landing at 41.5597727°N 84.9116284°W
- Forest Park at 41.5506061°N 84.9252400°W
- Fountain Park at 41.5631060°N 84.9141285°W
- Island Park at 41.5408838°N 84.9210732°W
- Oakwood at 41.5497727°N 84.9135729°W
- Otsego Center at 41.5725504°N 84.9088504°W
- Penn Park at 41.5442172°N 84.9238511°W
- Russels Point at 41.5539394°N 84.9241289°W

(This list is based on USGS data and may include former settlements.)

=== Adjacent townships ===
- Scott Township (north)
- York Township (northeast)
- Richland Township (east)
- Troy Township, DeKalb County (southeast)
- Franklin Township, DeKalb County (south)
- Smithfield Township, DeKalb County (southwest)
- Steuben Township (west)
- Pleasant Township (northwest)

=== Cemeteries ===
The township contains five cemeteries: Carter, Hamilton, North Otsego, Otsego Center and Teegardin.

=== Major highways ===
- Indiana State Road 1
- Indiana State Road 427
