= Steuben =

Steuben or Von Steuben most commonly refers to Friedrich Wilhelm von Steuben (1730–1794), Prussian-American military officer, or to a number of things named for him in the United States. It may also refer to:

== Places ==
- Steuben Township, Marshall County, Illinois
- Steuben County, Indiana
- Steuben Township, Steuben County, Indiana
- Steuben Township, Warren County, Indiana
- Steuben, Maine
- Steuben, New York
- Steuben County, New York
- Steuben Township, Pennsylvania
- Steuben, Wisconsin

== Ships ==
- SS General von Steuben, a German auxiliary cruiser sunk in February 1945
- USS Von Steuben (ID-3017), a U.S. Navy transport in World War I
- USS Von Steuben (SSBN-632), an American submarine
- USS Steuben County, a U.S. Navy tank landing ship in the Korean War

== Other uses ==
- Steuben Glass Works
- Steuben Monument, a sculpture in Milwaukee, Wisconsin
- Von Steuben Metropolitan Science Center
- German-American Steuben Parade

== People with the surname ==
- Friedrich Wilhelm von Steuben (1730–1794), Prussian officer who aided the colonials in the American Revolutionary War
- Charles de Steuben (1788–1856), a German-born French Romantic painter and lithographer active during the Napoleonic Era.
- Fritz Steuben (1898–1981), writer
- Kuno von Steuben (1855–1935), German general in World War I

== See also ==
- Steubenville, Indiana
- Steubenville, Ohio
- Von Steuben Day, holiday in Baron von Steuben's honor
