= Jock Somerlott =

American baseball player (1882–1965)

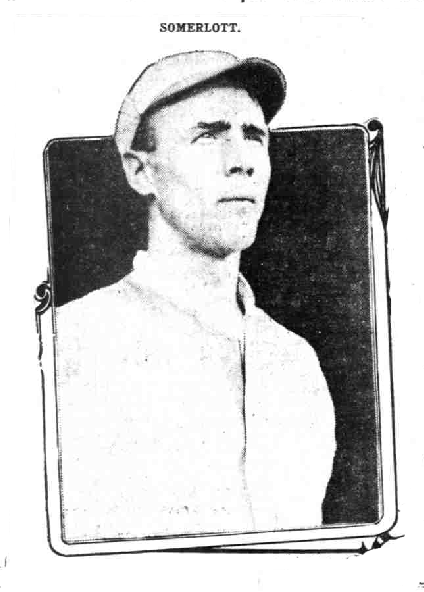
- First baseman
- Born: October 26, 1882; Flint, Indiana, U.S.
- Died: April 21, 1965 (aged 82); Butler, Indiana, U.S.
- Batted: Right Threw: Right

MLB debut
- September 19, 1910, for the Washington Senators

Last MLB appearance
- May 15, 1911, for the Washington Senators

MLB statistics
- Batting average: .204
- Hits: 21
- Runs: 8
- Stats at Baseball Reference

Teams
- Washington Senators (1910–1911)

John Wesley "Jock" Somerlott (October 26, 1882 – April 21, 1965) was an American first baseman in Major League Baseball who played for the Washington Senators from 1910 to 1911. In 29 career games, he batted .204, scored eight runs, and had four stolen bases.

== Personal life ==
John Wesley Somerlott was born in Flint, Indiana, to Jonas C.J. and Elmira (née Mabie) Somerlott, in 1882. He married Bertha Louisa Williams, and they were married at the parsonage of the Church of Christ in Metz by the Rev. F. D. Durham on October 18, 1906, and lived most of their lives together in Steuben County, Indiana. For a time after their marriage the Somerlotts lived in Garrett, Indiana, where he was employed as a fireman on the Baltimore and Ohio Railroad, from which he retired in 1912. He divided his time between baseball and farming until 1937, when the family moved to Bronson, Michigan, where he engaged in business until his retirement in 1947. The Somerlotts moved to Fort Wayne, Indiana, and then California, returning to Steuben County in 1951 until the death of Bertha in 1960, and finally moving to DeKalb County before John died. The couple had one son, John Francis "Jock" on September 1, 1908, in Metz, Steuben County, Indiana.

== Career ==
John Somerlott, or "Jock", as he was familiarly called by the old timers, was in professional baseball in Winnipeg, Manitoba, in the Southern Cooper County League. Somerlott went into the major league in the summer of 1910, with the Washington Nationals (now the Washington Senators), where he played for nearly a year, until he came back to Indiana late in 1911, taking over the Terre Haute ball club as playing manager, presumably he retired from baseball after the season of 1914, when he bought a farm in Steuben County. However, the baseball urge remained, and when Angola was in its heyday in baseball, and in the days when Charlie Gehringer was "farmed out" to Angola by the Detroit Tigers, John became the player-manager for the high-rating Angola team.

Professional career statistics

G	AB	R	H	2B	3B	HR	RBI	SB	BB	SO	BA	OBP	SLG	OPS	TB	SH	HBP
29	103	8	21	0	0	0	4	4	3	15	.204	.234	.204	.438	21	2	1
