= Steuben Township, Indiana =

Steuben Township, Indiana may refer to one of the following places:

- Steuben Township, Steuben County, Indiana
- Steuben Township, Warren County, Indiana

See also

- Steuben Township (disambiguation)
