= Scott Township, Steuben County, Indiana =

Scott Township
- Township
- Location in Steuben County
- Coordinates: 41°39′11″N 84°55′17″W
- Country: United States
- State: Indiana
- County: Steuben

Government
  - Type: Indiana township

Area
  - Total: 28.86 sq mi (74.7 km^{2})
  - Land: 28.7 sq mi (74 km^{2})
  - Water: 0.17 sq mi (0.44 km^{2}) 0.59%
- Elevation: 1,014 ft (309 m)

Population (2020)
  - Total: 1,197
  - Density: 38.7/sq mi (14.9/km^{2})
- Time zone: UTC-5 (Eastern (EST))
  - Summer (DST): UTC-4 (EDT)
- Area code: 260
- GNIS feature ID: 453838

Scott Township is one of twelve townships in Steuben County, Indiana, United States. As of the 2020 census, its population was 1,197, up from 1,111 at the 2010 census, and it contained 460 housing units.

== Geography ==
According to the 2010 census, the township has a total area of 28.86 square miles (74.7 km^{2}), of which 28.7 square miles (74 km^{2}) (or 99.45%) is land and 0.17 square miles (0.44 km^{2}) (or 0.59%) is water. Lakes in this township include Pigeon Lake.

=== Unincorporated towns ===
- Ellis at 41.6325503°N 84.9152393°W

(This list is based on USGS data and may include former settlements.)

=== Adjacent townships ===
- Fremont Township (north)
- York Township (east)
- Otsego Township (south)
- Steuben Township (southwest)
- Pleasant Township (west)
- Jamestown Township (northwest)

=== Cemeteries ===
The township contains four cemeteries: Jones, Jordan, Kope and South Scott.

=== Major highways ===
- Interstate 80
- U.S. Route 20
- Indiana State Road 1
- Indiana State Road 827
