= Cornish Griffin Round Barn =

Historic building in Indiana, US

- U.S. National Register of Historic Places
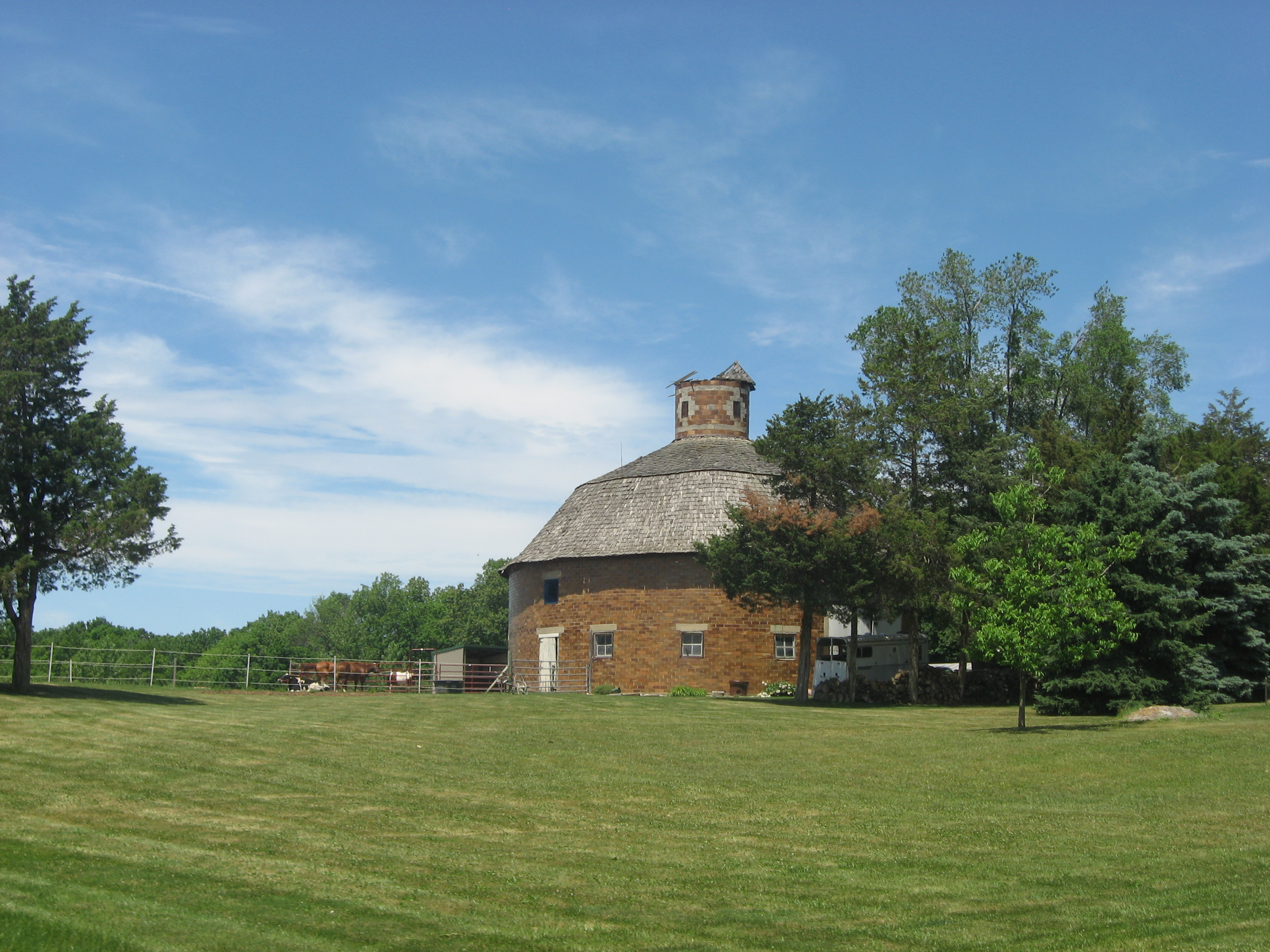
- Roadside view of the barn

- Location within Indiana Location within the United States
- Location: 2015 SW. Fox Lake Rd., north of Pleasant Lake in Steuben Township, Steuben County, Indiana
- Coordinates: 41°36′39″N 85°2′16″W
- Area: Less than 1 acre (0.40 ha)
- Built: c. 1915
- Architect: Cornish Griffin
- Architectural style: True-circular barn
- MPS: Round and Polygonal Barns of Indiana MPS
- NRHP reference No.: 93000187
- Added to NRHP: April 2, 1993

The Cornish Griffin Round Barn, also known as the "Keeler Barn", is a historic round barn located near Pleasant Lake in Steuben Township, Steuben County, Indiana. It was built between 1910 and 1920, and is the only historic round barn in the state with glazed tiles, although many other barns in the state were built with unglazed tile silos. The two-level barn is topped by a two-pitch gambrel roof and the roof is sheathed in wood shingles.

It was listed on the National Register of Historic Places in 1993.
