= Alvarado =

Alvarado may refer to:

== Places ==
- Alvarado, Tolima, Colombia
- Alvarado (canton), Costa Rica
- Alvarado, Veracruz, Mexico
- Alvarado (municipality), Veracruz, Mexico
- Alvarado, Extremadura, Spain
  - Alvarado I solar thermal power station, in Alvarado, Spain
- Alvarado, California, US
- Alvarado, Indiana, US
- Alvarado, Minnesota, US
- Alvarado, Texas, US
- Alvarado, Virginia, US

== Other uses ==
- Alvarado (surname)
  - Alvarado family, conquistadors
  - Alvarado wrestling family
- Alvarado (Madrid Metro), a station on Line 1
- Alvarado Transportation Center, a multimodal transit hub in Albuquerque, New Mexico, US
- Alvarado High School, a high school in the Alvarado Independent School District, Alvarado, Texas
