= Steuben Township =

Steuben Township may refer to the following places in the United States:

== Illinois ==
- Steuben Township, Marshall County, Illinois

== Indiana ==
- Steuben Township, Steuben County, Indiana
- Steuben Township, Warren County, Indiana

== Pennsylvania ==
- Steuben Township, Pennsylvania

== See also ==
- Steuben (disambiguation)
