= Wildwood, Indiana =

- Unincorporated community Census designated place
- Location within Indiana Location within the United States
- Coordinates: 41°35′36″N 85°11′23″W
- Country: United States
- State: Indiana
- County: Steuben
- Township: Salem
- Elevation: 958 ft (292 m)
- Time zone: UTC-5 (Eastern (EST))
  - Summer (DST): UTC-4 (EDT)
- ZIP code: 46761
- Area code: 260
- GNIS feature ID: 2830549

Wildwood is an unincorporated community and census designated place (CDP) in Salem Township, Steuben County, in the U.S. state of Indiana.

== Demographics ==
Historical population
Census	Pop.	Note	%±
2023 (est.)	191

The United States Census Bureau defined Wildwood as a census designated place in the 2022 American Community Survey.
