= Salem Township, Steuben County, Indiana =

Salem Township
- Township
- Location in Steuben County
- Coordinates: 41°34′15″N 85°08′23″W
- Country: United States
- State: Indiana
- County: Steuben

Government
  - Type: Indiana township

Area
  - Total: 34.61 sq mi (89.6 km^{2})
  - Land: 33.92 sq mi (87.9 km^{2})
  - Water: 0.69 sq mi (1.8 km^{2}) 1.99%
- Elevation: 1,004 ft (306 m)

Population (2020)
  - Total: 2,189
  - Density: 66.7/sq mi (25.8/km^{2})
- Time zone: UTC-5 (Eastern (EST))
  - Summer (DST): UTC-4 (EDT)
- Area code: 260
- GNIS feature ID: 453825

Salem Township is one of twelve townships in Steuben County, Indiana, United States. As of the 2020 census, its population was 2,189, down from 2,262 at 2010, and it contained 1,144 housing units.

== Geography ==
According to the 2010 census, the township has a total area of 34.61 square miles (89.6 km^{2}), of which 33.92 square miles (87.9 km^{2}) (or 98.01%) is land and 0.69 square miles (1.8 km^{2}) (or 1.99%) is water. Lakes in this township include Big Turkey Lake, Black Lake, Henry Lake, Limekiln Lake, Little Turkey Lake and McClish Lake. The streams of Mud Creek, Mud Creek and Nettle Creek run through this township.

=== Cities and towns ===
- Hudson (northwest half)

=== Unincorporated towns ===
- Helmer at 41.5311613°N 85.1702495°W
- Lakeside Park at 41.5875502°N 85.1955281°W
- Meadow Shores Park at 41.5833835°N 85.1905279°W
- Salem Center at 41.5850502°N 85.1396925°W
- Turkey Creek at 41.5558835°N 85.1708049°W
- Westview at 41.5864391°N 85.1827498°W
- Wildwood at 41.5947724°N 85.1894166°W

(This list is based on USGS data and may include former settlements.)

=== Adjacent townships ===
- Jackson Township (north)
- Pleasant Township (northeast)
- Steuben Township (east)
- Smithfield Township, DeKalb County (southeast)
- Fairfield Township, DeKalb County (south)
- Wayne Township, Noble County (southwest)
- Milford Township, LaGrange County (west)
- Springfield Township, LaGrange County (northwest)

=== Cemeteries ===
The township contains six cemeteries: Block, Circle, County Line, Hollister, Trinity and Wright.

=== Major highways ===
- Indiana State Road 327
