= Metz, Indiana =

- Unincorporated community and Census designated place
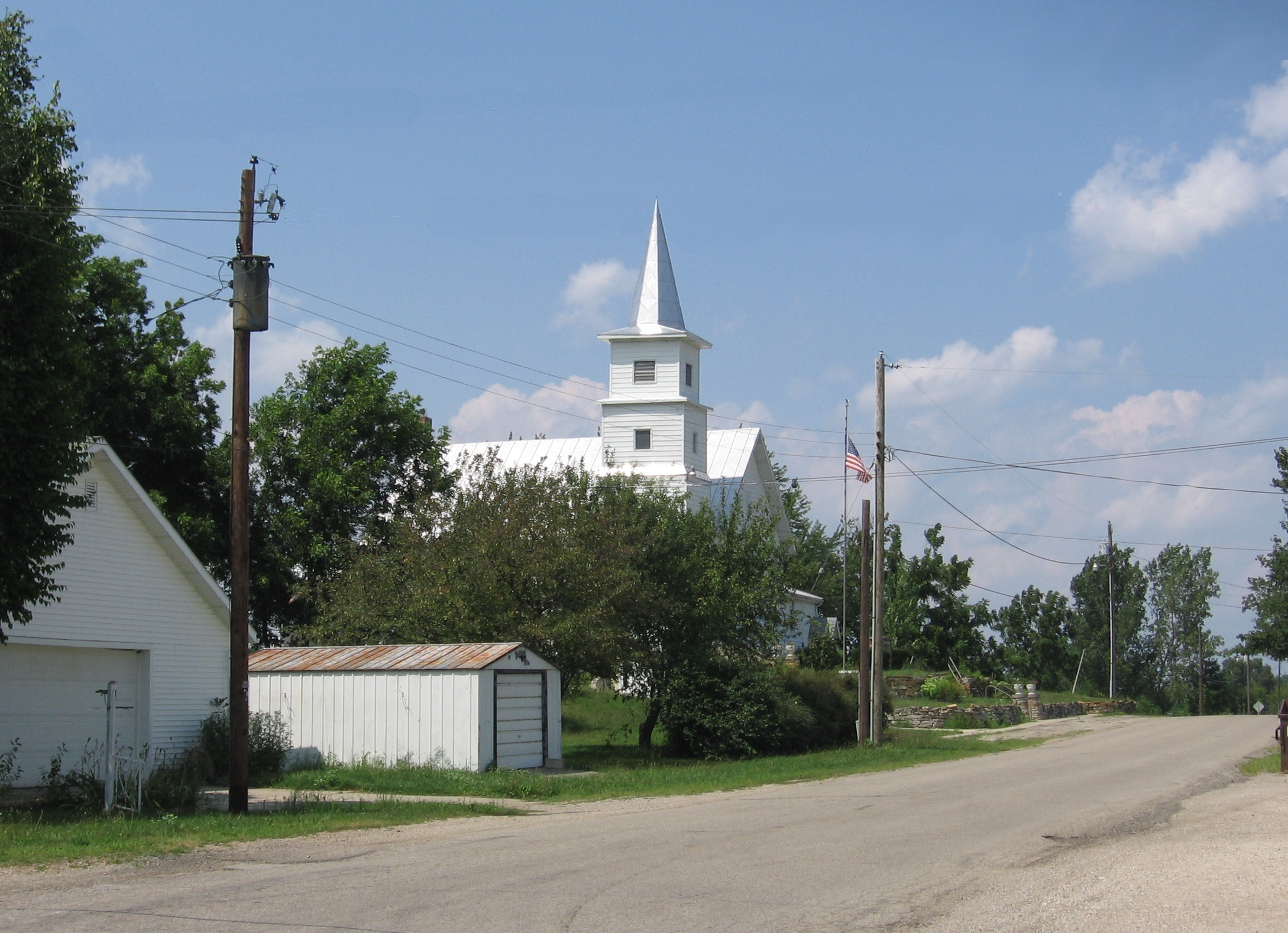
- Metz, looking north from the main intersection toward the Metz Christian Church.

- Location within Indiana Location within the United States
- Coordinates: 41°36′59″N 84°50′15″W
- Country: United States
- State: Indiana
- County: Steuben
- Township: York
- Elevation: 994 ft (303 m)
- Time zone: UTC-5 (Eastern (EST))
  - Summer (DST): UTC-4 (EDT)
- ZIP code: 46703
- Area code: 260
- FIPS code: 18-48618
- GNIS feature ID: 2830545

Metz is an unincorporated community in York Township, Steuben County, in the U.S. state of Indiana.

== History ==
In 1836, Fayette Barron was the first settler at the crossroads that would become Metz.

The village of Metz reached its heyday during the late 19th and early 20th century. By 1885, the village had two dry goods and several other retail shops, a saw mill and a flouring mill, a hotel, various craftsman, and four physicians.

In 1919, the York township schools were consolidated with those of Richland Township into the Metz school. This school, with students from kindergarten through high school, operated for 40 years, until it was closed in 1959, a victim of falling enrollment. Its sports teams were the Mohawks.

A post office was established at Metz in 1849, and remained in operation until it was discontinued in 1959.

Metz Christian Church, built in 1864, is one of the oldest Church of Christ churches in Steuben County.

== Geography ==
Metz is located at the intersection of roads 800 E and 200 S.

== Demographics ==
The United States Census Bureau defined Metz as a census designated place in the 2022 American Community Survey.
