= Alvarado, Indiana =

- Unincorporated community
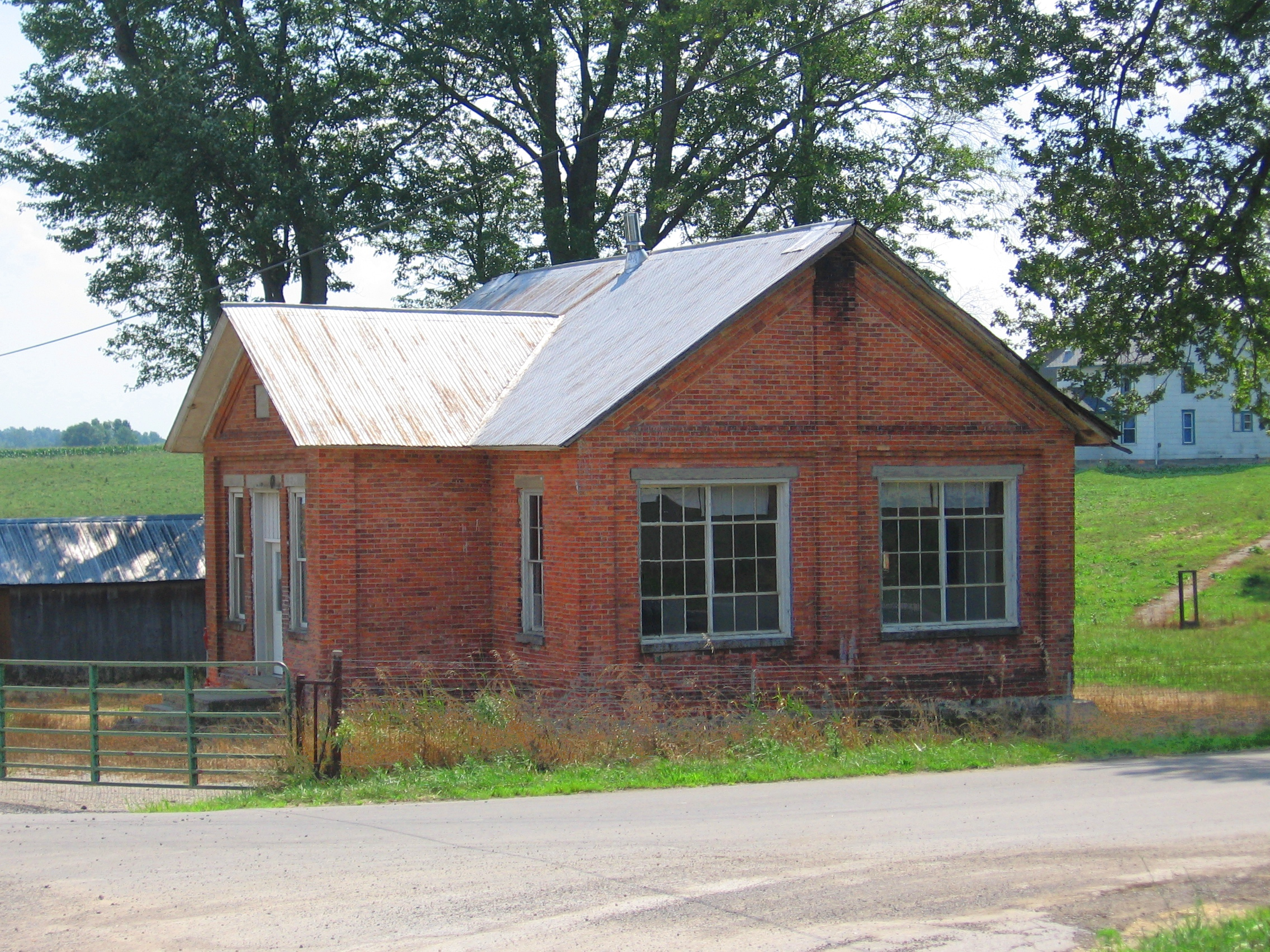
- An old brick house in Alvarado

- Location within Indiana Location within the United States
- Coordinates: 41°34′36″N 84°50′16″W
- Country: United States
- State: Indiana
- County: Steuben
- Township: Richland
- Elevation: 958 ft (292 m)
- Time zone: UTC-5 (Eastern (EST))
  - Summer (DST): UTC-4 (EDT)
- ZIP code: 46742
- Area code: 260
- GNIS feature ID: 430126

Alvarado is an unincorporated community in Richland Township, Steuben County, in the U.S. state of Indiana.

== History ==
=== Early years ===
A post office was established at Alvarado in 1855, and remained in operation until 1904. An old variant name of the community was called Richland Center. In 1849, the Alvarado United Methodist Church was built, and is still in service today.

In 1885, the village of Richland Center was described thus: "Richland Center is a small village, located mostly on the northwest corner of section 20 [of Richland Township]. It is a convenient postoffice for the township, has a graded school and a store, the latter kept by John Douglas, who is also Postmaster. The postoffice is known as Alvarado."

In 1890, the population was estimated as around 300 residents.

=== 20th century ===
In 1900, the population was 321. Alvarado School still operated in the early 20th Century.

By 1920, the population had dropped to 30. The population was 5 in 1930.

== Geography ==
Alvarado lies 1 mile (1.6 km) north of Indiana State Road 427, 3 miles (4.8 km) south of Metz.
