= York, Indiana =

- Unincorporated community
- Location within Indiana Location within the United States
- Coordinates: 41°41′18″N 84°49′21″W
- Country: United States
- State: Indiana
- County: Steuben
- Township: York
- Elevation: 1,066 ft (325 m)
- Time zone: UTC-5 (Eastern (EST))
  - Summer (DST): UTC-4 (EDT)
- ZIP code: 46737
- Area code: 260
- GNIS feature ID: 449750

York is an unincorporated community in York Township, Steuben County, in the U.S. state of Indiana.

== History ==
A post office was established at York in 1839, and remained in operation until 1907. An old variant name of the community was called Hathaway.
