= Powers Church =

Historic church in Indiana, United States

- Free Church
- U.S. National Register of Historic Places
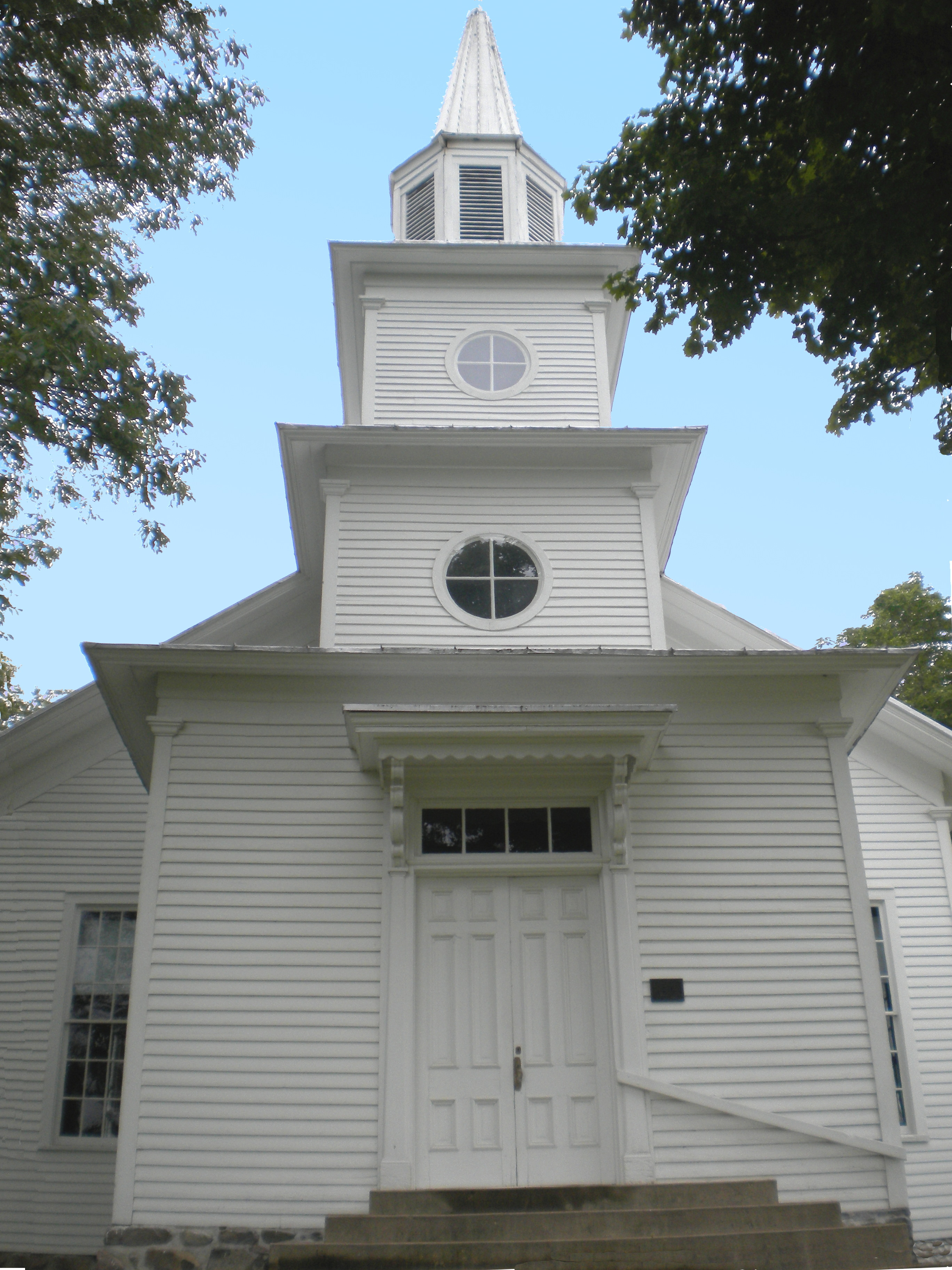
- Front of the church

- Location within Indiana Location within the United States
- Location: Old State Road 1 N., east of Angola in York Township, Steuben County, Indiana
- Coordinates: 41°38′6″N 84°50′17″W
- Area: 10.241 acres (4.144 ha)
- Built: 1876
- Architect: Calvin & Winn Powers
- Architectural style: Greek Revival, Italianate
- Website: powerschurch.org
- NRHP reference No.: 83000149
- Added to NRHP: March 24, 1983

The Powers Church is a historic church in York Township, Steuben County, Indiana, described as a "fine example of early northern Indiana Colonial Revival architecture". In 1983, it was added to the National Register of Historic Places, where it is listed as Free Church, a reference to the Church's non-denominational nature.

The church was built between 1875 and 1876 for $1827 on land donated by the Powers family, one of the earliest settlers in the area. In the 1920s, a dwindling congregation brought an end to the regular services, although the church was still used for funerals and other events until the 1950s, when it was closed. The building sat unused until 1976, at which time a restoration effort was undertaken. Restorers found that many of the original furnishings were still serviceable, including the oak and butternut woodwork and pews as well as the carpet. The steeple was most in need of restoration.

In 1978, the church was again opened to the public, starting an annual tradition of three monthly non-denominational services – June, July, and August – led by area ministers and featuring local musicians, and often followed by an ice cream social.

The building consists of only two rooms: a small anteroom which leads, via two flanking doors, to the much larger sanctuary. The steeple is accessed via a rough-hewn ladder in the anteroom. Behind the church, to the east, stands a boulder commemorating the arrival of the Powers settlers in 1837, and beyond that lies the 10.241-acre (41,440 m^{2}) Powers Cemetery, where the first burials date from 1839, nearly 40 years before the church.

== Gallery ==
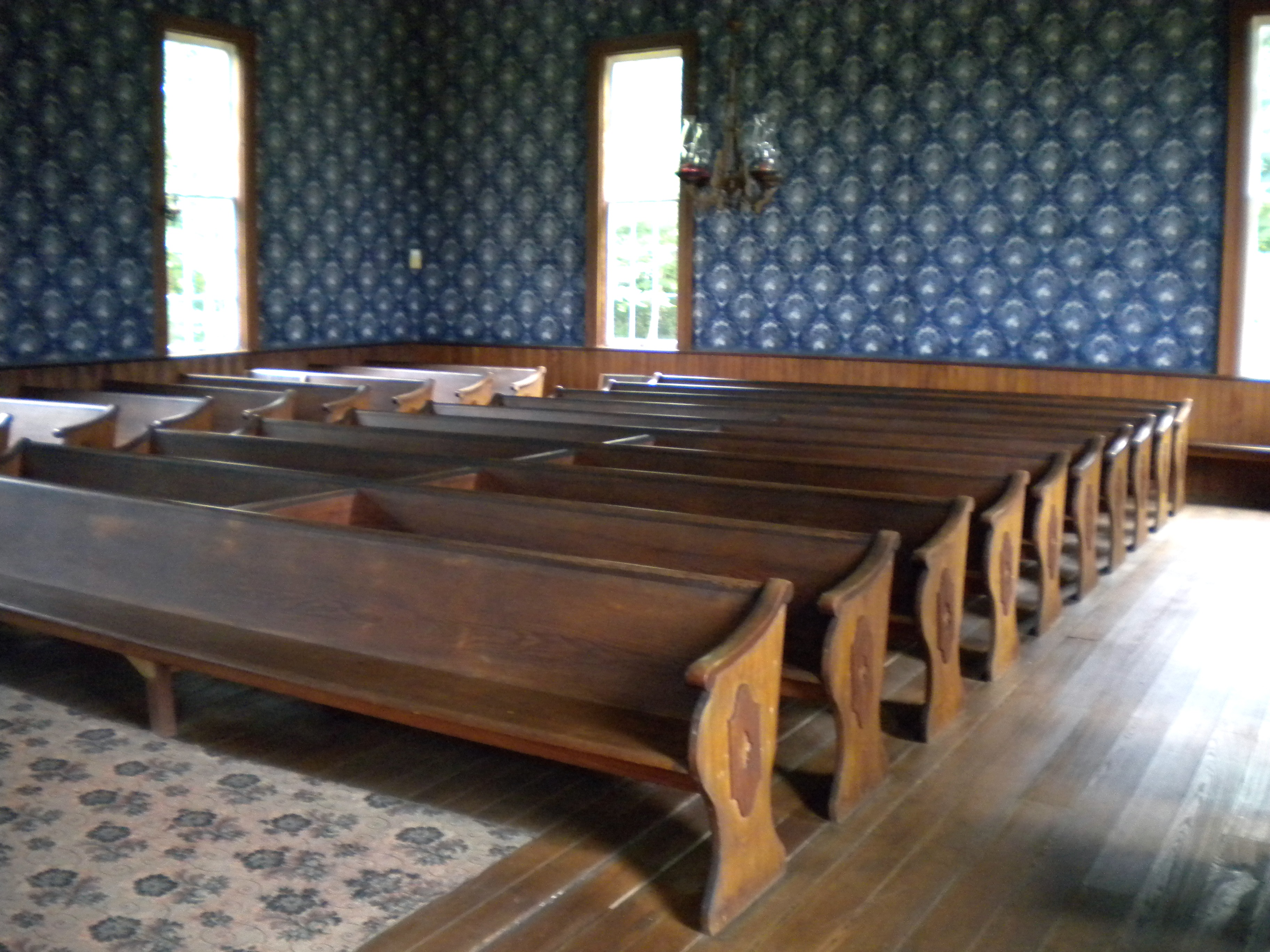
Unlike most churches, the pews are divided down the center by a wooden panel.

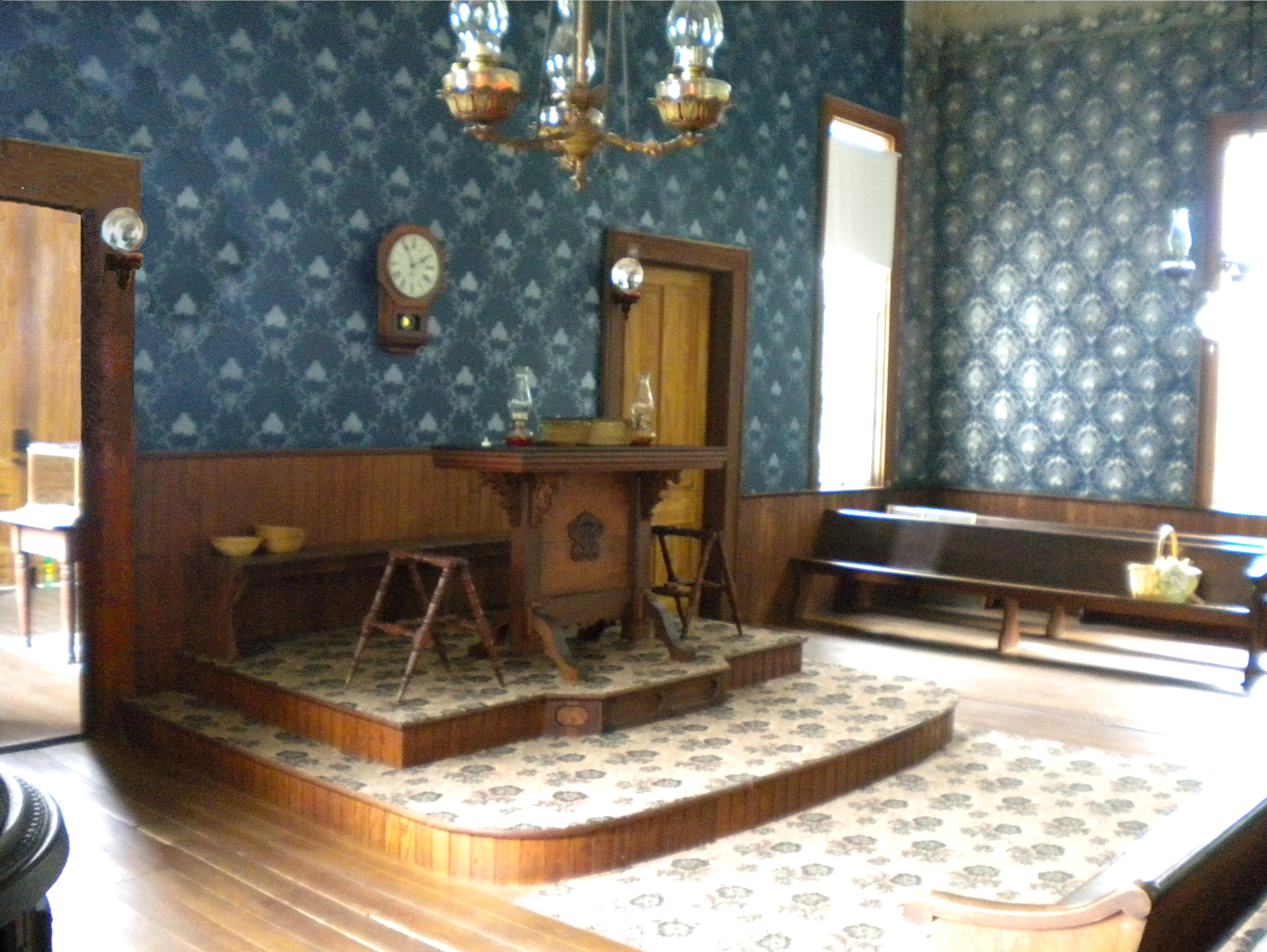
The podium at the front of the chapel

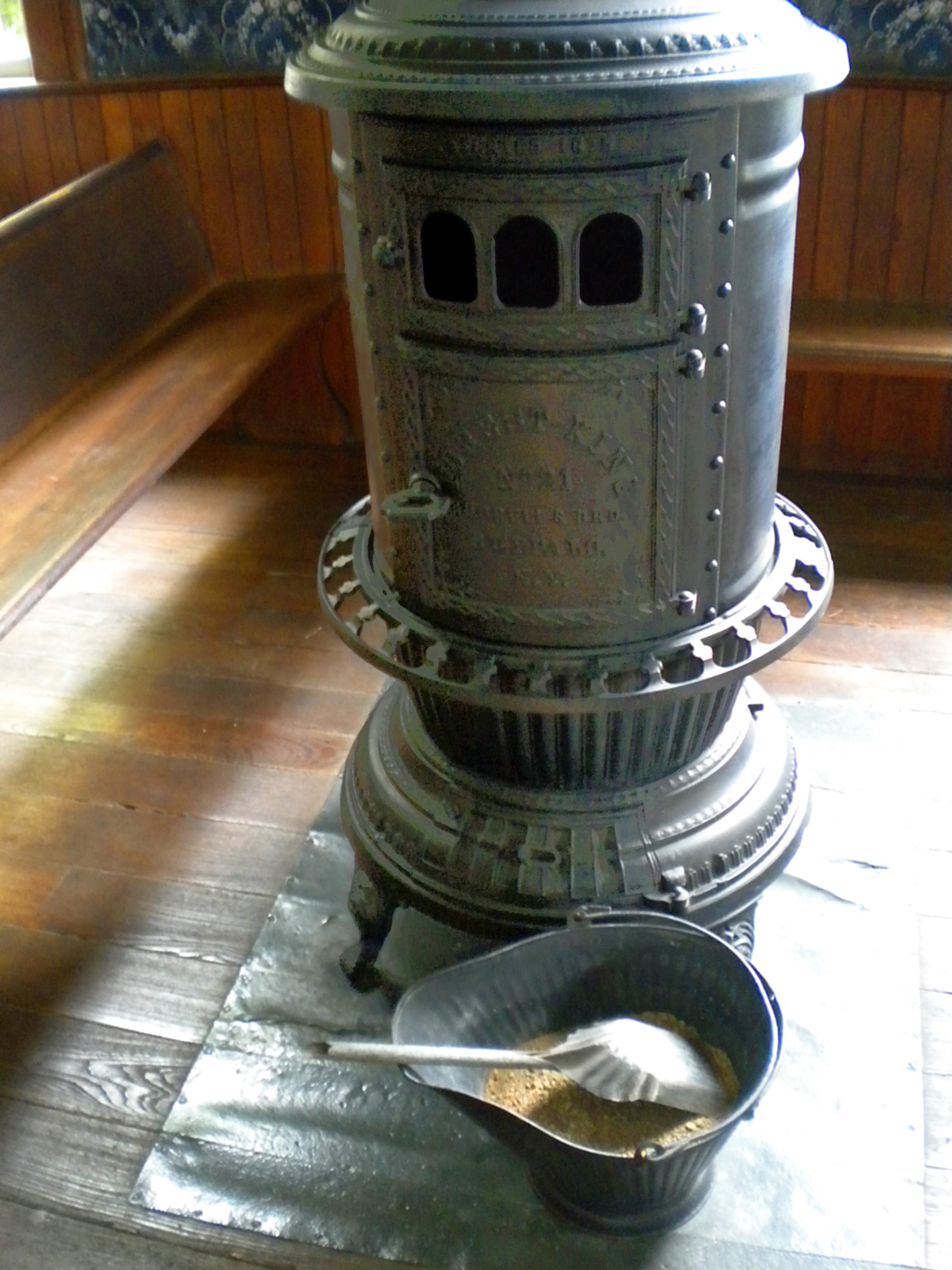
A pair of these stoves provide the heat for the church.
