= Salem Center, Indiana =

- Unincorporated community
- Location within Indiana Location within the United States
- Coordinates: 41°35′06″N 85°08′23″W
- Country: United States
- State: Indiana
- County: Steuben
- Township: Salem
- Elevation: 1,050 ft (320 m)
- Time zone: UTC-5 (Eastern (EST))
  - Summer (DST): UTC-4 (EDT)
- ZIP code: 46747
- Area code: 260
- GNIS feature ID: 449727

Salem Center is an unincorporated community in Salem Township, Steuben County, in the U.S. state of Indiana.

== History ==
A post office was established at Salem Center in 1852, and remained in operation until it was discontinued in 1903.
