= Pleasant Lake station (Indiana) =

- Pleasant Lake Depot
- U.S. National Register of Historic Places
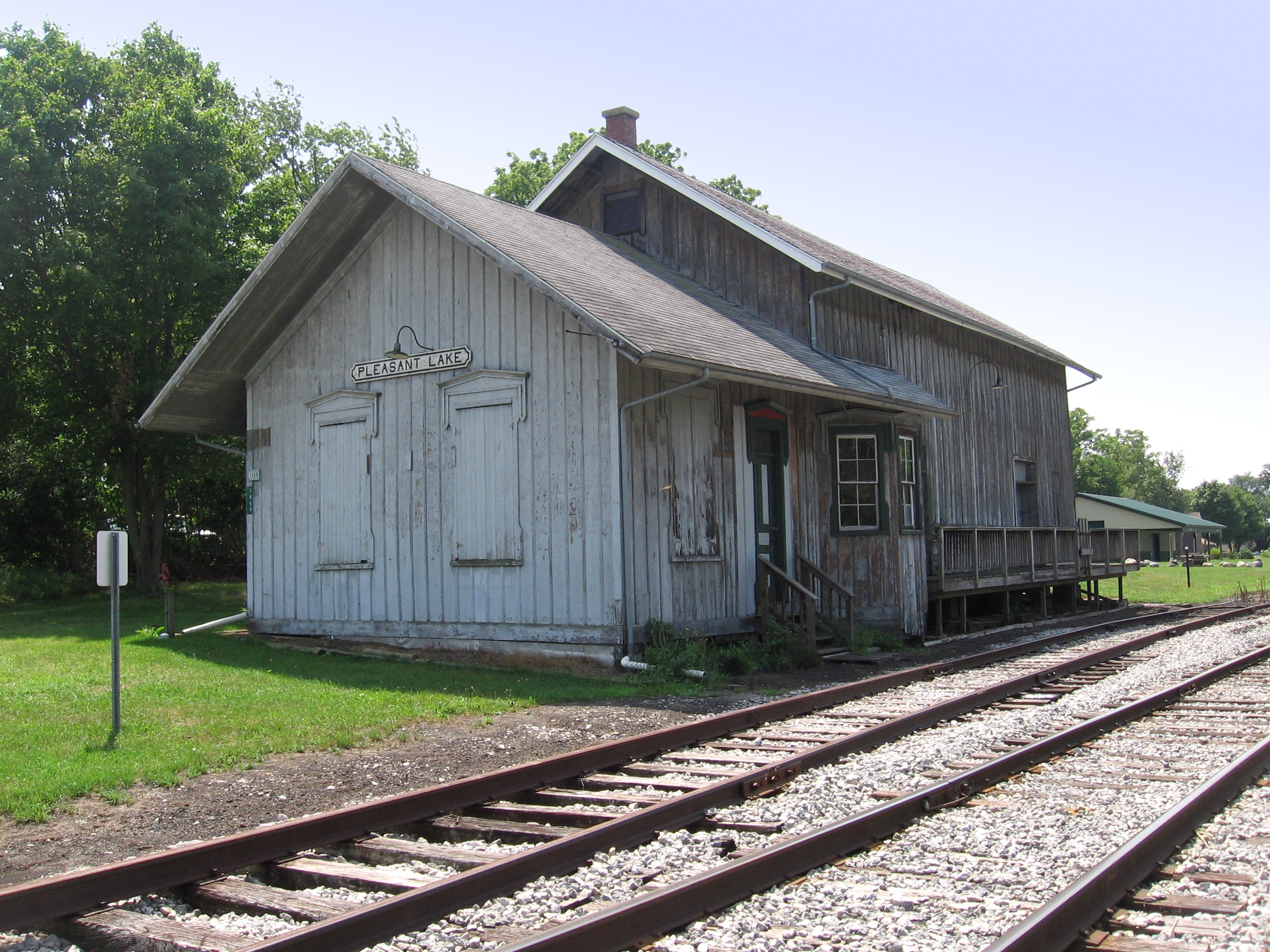
- Pleasant Lake Station, August 2010

- Location within Indiana Location within the United States
- Location: 1469 W. Main St. at Pleasant Lake, Indiana
- Coordinates: 41°34′28″N 85°1′5″W
- Area: less than one acre
- Built: 1882
- Architectural style: Gothic Revival
- NRHP reference No.: 01001344
- Added to NRHP: December 7, 2001

Pleasant Lake, also known as the New York Central Railroad Depot, is a historic train station located at Pleasant Lake, Indiana. It was built in 1882 by the Lake Shore and Michigan Southern Railway, and is a one-story, rectangular, Gothic Revival style frame building. It has a gable roof and is clad in board and batten siding.

It was listed on the National Register of Historic Places in 2001 as the Pleasant Lake Depot.

Preceding station	New York Central Railroad	Following station
Steubenville toward Fort Wayne	Fort Wayne Branch	Angola toward Jackson
