= Jackson Township, Steuben County, Indiana =

Jackson Township
- Township
- Location in Steuben County
- Coordinates: 41°39′23″N 85°08′36″W
- Country: United States
- State: Indiana
- County: Steuben

Government
  - Type: Indiana township

Area
  - Total: 35 sq mi (91 km^{2})
  - Land: 33.94 sq mi (87.9 km^{2})
  - Water: 1.05 sq mi (2.7 km^{2}) 3.00%
- Elevation: 950 ft (290 m)

Population (2020)
  - Total: 1,633
  - Density: 52.4/sq mi (20.2/km^{2})
- Time zone: UTC-5 (Eastern (EST))
  - Summer (DST): UTC-4 (EDT)
- Area code: 260
- GNIS feature ID: 453469

Jackson Township is one of twelve townships in Steuben County, Indiana, United States. As of the 2020 census, its population was 1,633, down from 1,777 at 2010, and it contained 887 housing units.

== Geography ==
According to the 2010 census, the township has a total area of 35 square miles (91 km^{2}), of which 33.94 square miles (87.9 km^{2}) (or 96.97%) is land and 1.05 square miles (2.7 km^{2}) (or 3.00%) is water. Lakes in this township include Bass Lake, Beaverdam Lake, Deep Lake, Grass Lake, Hogback Lake, Howard Lake, Lake Arrowhead, Otter Lake, Pine Canyon Lake, Shallow Lake and Stayner Lake.

=== Unincorporated towns ===
- Flint at 41.6500502°N 85.1271917°W
- Inverness at 41.7006059°N 85.0935790°W

(This list is based on USGS data and may include former settlements.)

=== Adjacent townships ===
- Millgrove Township (north)
- Jamestown Township (northeast)
- Pleasant Township (east)
- Steuben Township (southeast)
- Salem Township (south)
- Milford Township, LaGrange County (southwest)
- Springfield Township, LaGrange County (west)
- Greenfield Township, LaGrange County (northwest)

=== Cemeteries ===
The township contains three cemeteries: Flint, Jackson Prairie and Lake Gage.

=== Major highways ===
- Indiana State Road 327

=== Airports and landing strips ===
- Tri-State Steuben County Airport
