= Ellis, Steuben County, Indiana =

Ellis
- Unincorporated community
- Location within Indiana Location within the United States
- Coordinates: 41°37′57″N 84°54′55″W
- Country: United States
- State: Indiana
- County: Steuben
- Township: Scott
- Elevation: 1,017 ft (310 m)
- Time zone: UTC-5 (Eastern (EST))
  - Summer (DST): UTC-4 (EDT)
- ZIP code: 46703
- Area code: 260
- GNIS feature ID: 434105

Ellis is an unincorporated community in Scott Township, Steuben County, in the U.S. state of Indiana.

== History ==
A post office was established at Ellis in 1888, and remained in operation until it was discontinued in 1903.
