= Inverness, Indiana =

- Unincorporated community
- Location within Indiana Location within the United States
- Coordinates: 41°42′02″N 85°05′37″W
- Country: United States
- State: Indiana
- County: Steuben
- Township: Jackson
- Elevation: 994 ft (303 m)
- Time zone: UTC-5 (Eastern (EST))
  - Summer (DST): UTC-4 (EDT)
- ZIP code: 46703
- Area code: 260
- GNIS feature ID: 436820

Inverness is an unincorporated community in Jackson Township, Steuben County, in the U.S. state of Indiana.
