= Moonlight, Indiana =

- Unincorporated community
- Location within Indiana Location within the United States
- Coordinates: 41°35′04″N 85°01′52″W
- Country: United States
- State: Indiana
- County: Steuben
- Township: Steuben
- Elevation: 958 ft (292 m)
- Time zone: UTC-5 (Eastern (EST))
  - Summer (DST): UTC-4 (EDT)
- ZIP code: 46779
- Area code: 260
- GNIS feature ID: 439385

Moonlight is an unincorporated community in Steuben Township, Steuben County, in the U.S. state of Indiana.
