= York Township, Steuben County, Indiana =

York Township
- Township
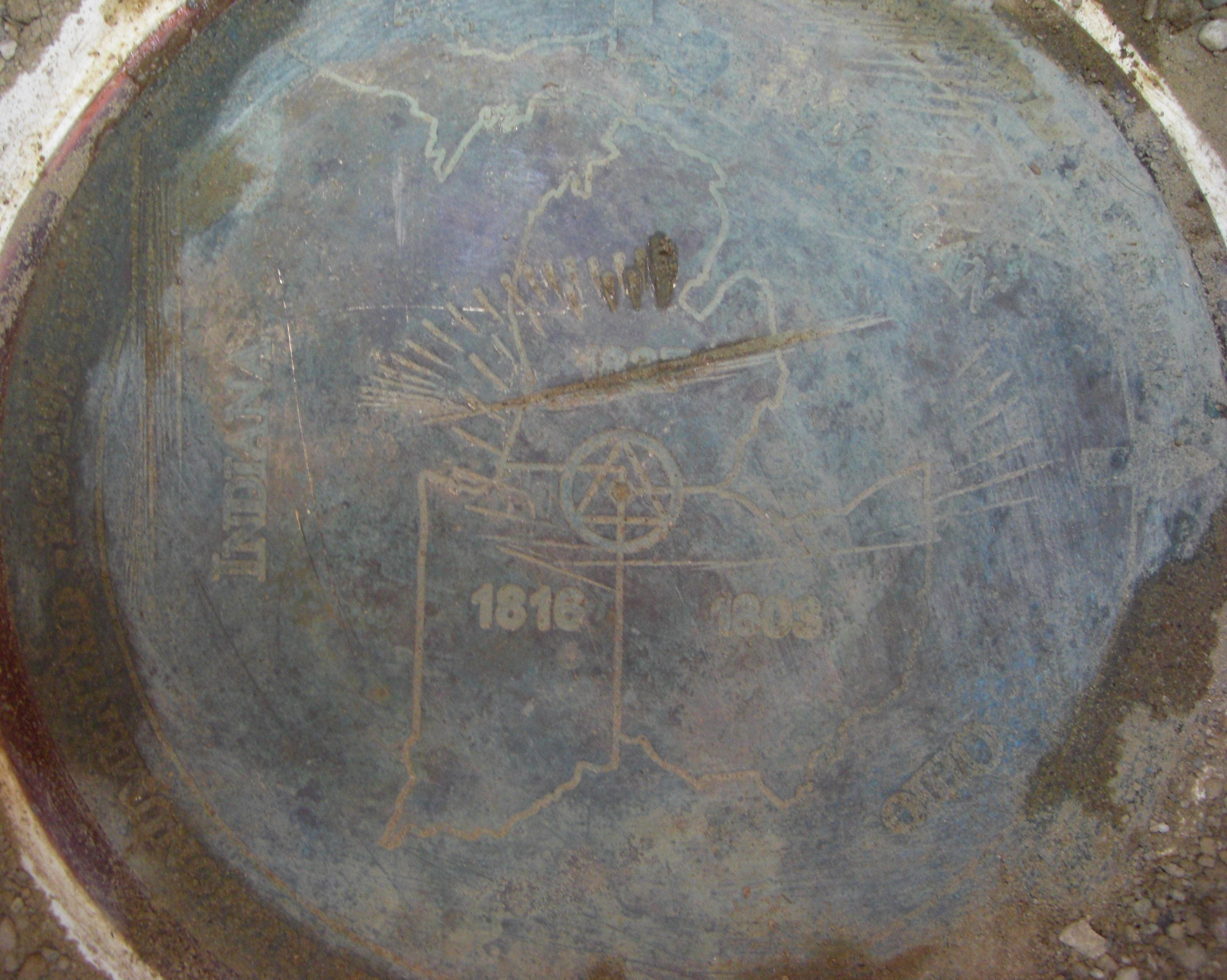
- The brass disc officially marking Indiana's border with Michigan and Ohio

- Location in Steuben County
- Coordinates: 41°39′28″N 84°50′37″W
- Country: United States
- State: Indiana
- County: Steuben

Government
  - Type: Indiana township

Area
  - Total: 22.19 sq mi (57.5 km^{2})
  - Land: 22.19 sq mi (57.5 km^{2})
  - Water: 0 sq mi (0 km^{2}) 0%
- Elevation: 980 ft (300 m)

Population (2020)
  - Total: 710
  - Density: 33/sq mi (13/km^{2})
- Time zone: UTC-5 (Eastern (EST))
  - Summer (DST): UTC-4 (EDT)
- Area code: 260
- GNIS feature ID: 454070

York Township is one of twelve townships in Steuben County, Indiana, United States. As of the 2020 census, its population was 710, down from 733 at 2010, and it contained 293 housing units. York Township has the distinction of being Indiana's lone township to border both Michigan and Ohio as well as bordering two states on land as all other tri-points along Indiana's border are underwater.

== Geography ==
According to the 2010 census, the township has a total area of 22.19 square miles (57.5 km^{2}), all land. The streams of Hanselman Branch and West Branch Fish Creek run through this township.

=== Unincorporated towns ===
- Berlien at 41.6367169°N 84.8766268°W
- Courtney Corner at 41.6294946°N 84.8385700°W
- Eastpoint Terminal (a tollbooth on the Indiana Toll Road)
- Metz at 41.6161614°N 84.8394033°W
- Page at 41.6875500°N 84.8596816°W
- York at 41.6883832°N 84.8224581°W

(This list is based on USGS data and may include former settlements.)

=== Cemeteries ===
The township contains three cemeteries: Dygert, York, and Powers.

=== Major highways ===
- Indiana Toll Road (Interstate 80 and Interstate 90)
- U.S. Route 20

== History ==
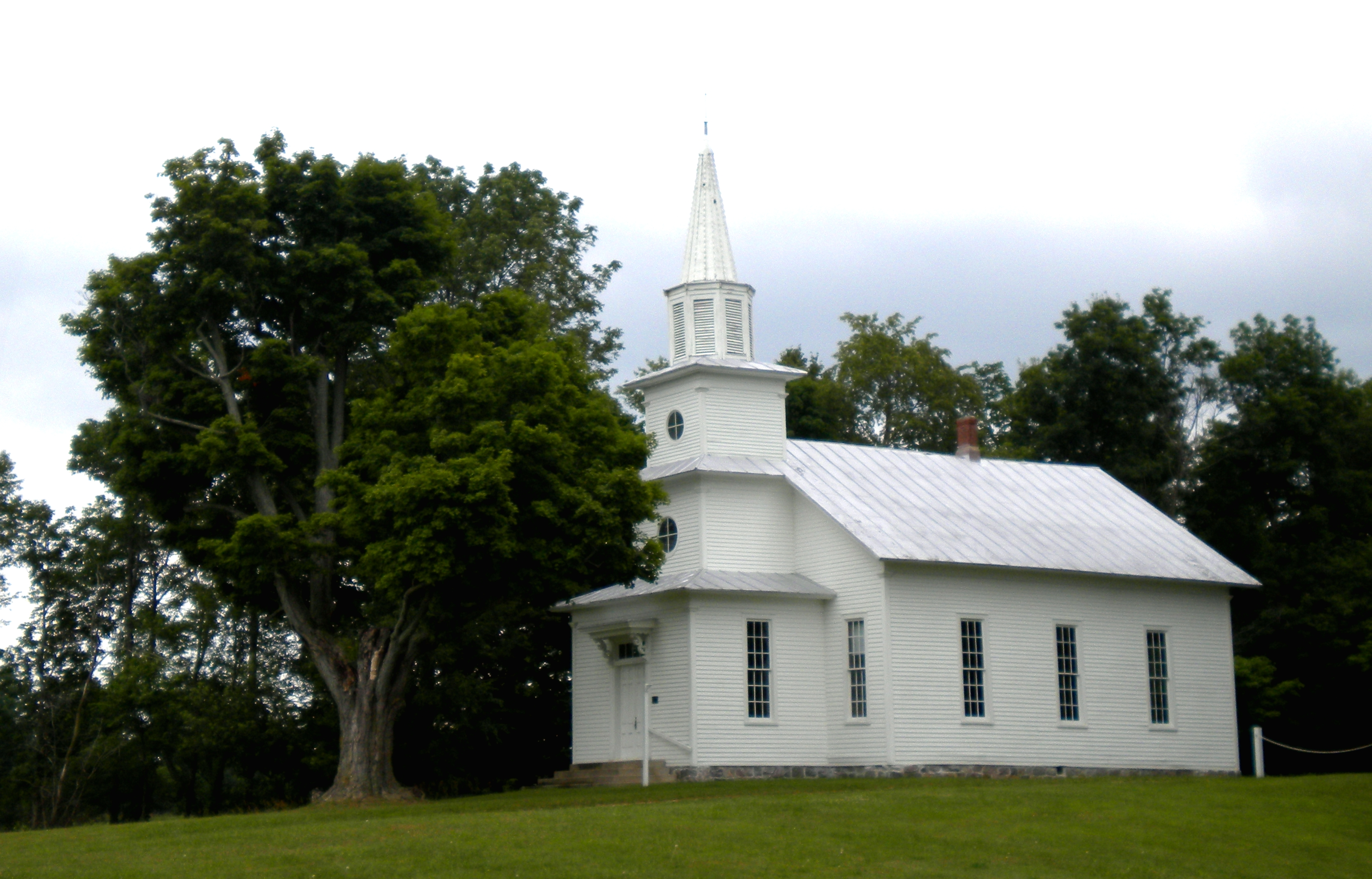
The Powers Church was built in 1876 on land donated by the Powers family. Restored in the 1970s, it was added to the National Register of Historic Places in 1983. Monthly non-denominational services are held in the summer.

In the decades before it was settled by white immigrants, York Township and the surrounding area were the domain of the Potawatomi Indians.

The first recorded white settler in York Township was Fayette Barron, who built a homestead at what would become Metz in 1836. The following year saw the arrival of the Powers families, who settled in the northwest sections of the township. Two Powers brothers had scouted the area the year before, and now brought six families on a long journey from New York state.

In 1879, the Powers families and neighbors built what is now known as the Powers Church. The land for a nondenominational church (hence its other name "Free Church") had been donated in 1839 by Clark Powers, head of one of the original Powers families. The last regular services were held at the church in the 1920s. The church was restored in 1976 and added to the National Register of Historic Places in 1983.

The unincorporated village of Metz enjoyed its heyday during the late 19th and early 20th centuries. At one point or another it boasted a sawmill, a hotel, physicians, an undertaker, and several of the more typical retail shops. In 1919, the York township schools were consolidated with those of Richland Township into the Metz school. This school, with students from kindergarten through high school, operated for 40 years, until it was closed in 1959, a victim of declining enrollment.

== Education ==
York Township residents may obtain a free library card from the Carnegie Public Library of Steuben County.
