= Helmer, Indiana =

- Unincorporated community
- Location within Indiana Location within the United States
- Coordinates: 41°31′58″N 85°10′16″W
- Country: United States
- State: Indiana
- County: Steuben
- Township: Salem
- Elevation: 1,001 ft (305 m)
- Time zone: UTC-5 (Eastern (EST))
  - Summer (DST): UTC-4 (EDT)
- ZIP code: 46747
- Area code: 260
- FIPS code: 18-32926
- GNIS feature ID: 2830542

Helmer is an unincorporated community in Salem Township, Steuben County, in the U.S. state of Indiana.

== History ==
Helmer was a town that started and grew because of the railroad it is located on. Helmer no longer has a post office nor a fire department as it merged with the Salem Center Fire Department.

== Demographics ==
The United States Census Bureau delineated Helmer as a census designated place in the 2022 American Community Survey.
