= Hudson, Indiana =

- Town
- Logo

- Location of Hudson in Steuben County, Indiana.
- Coordinates: 41°31′55″N 85°05′03″W
- Country: United States
- State: Indiana
- County: Steuben
- Township: Steuben, Salem
- Established: August 14, 1869
- Incorporated: 1892

Area
  - Total: 0.69 sq mi (1.80 km^{2})
  - Land: 0.69 sq mi (1.80 km^{2})
  - Water: 0 sq mi (0.00 km^{2})
- Elevation: 974 ft (297 m)

Population (2020)
  - Total: 585
  - Density: 840.8/sq mi (324.62/km^{2})
- Time zone: UTC-5 (Eastern (EST))
  - Summer (DST): UTC-4 (EDT)
- ZIP code: 46747
- Area code: 260
- FIPS code: 18-35086
- GNIS feature ID: 2397001
- Website: www.hudsontown.org

Hudson is a town in Salem and Steuben townships, Steuben County, in the U.S. state of Indiana. The population was 585 at the 2020 census.

== History ==
An old variant name of the community was called North Benton. Hudson was founded by a group of settlers on August 14, 1869. The Hudson post office has been in operation since 1875. Hudson was incorporated as a town in 1892.

== Geography ==
According to the 2010 census, Hudson has a total area of 0.69 square miles (1.79 km^{2}), all land.

== Demographics ==
Historical population
Census	Pop.	Note	%±
1880	316		—
1900	558		—
1910	390		−30.1%
1920	385		−1.3%
1930	431		11.9%
1940	437		1.4%
1950	420		−3.9%
1960	428		1.9%
1970	464		8.4%
1980	447		−3.7%
1990	438		−2.0%
2000	596		36.1%
2010	518		−13.1%
2020	585		12.9%
U.S. Decennial Census

=== 2010 census ===
As of the census of 2010, there were 518 people, 185 households, and 136 families living in the town. The population density was 750.7 inhabitants per square mile (289.8/km^{2}). There were 214 housing units at an average density of 310.1 per square mile (119.7/km^{2}). The racial makeup of the town was 98.1% White, 0.2% Native American, 0.6% Asian, 0.2% Pacific Islander, 0.1% Hudson, 0.6% from other races, and 0.4% from two or more races. Hispanic or Latino of any race were 1.9% of the population.

There were 185 households, of which 42.2% had children under the age of 18 living with them, 51.9% were married couples living together, 11.9% had a female householder with no husband present, 9.7% had a male householder with no wife present, and 26.5% were non-families. 21.6% of all households were made up of individuals, and 6.4% had someone living alone who was 65 years of age or older. The average household size was 2.80 and the average family size was 3.14.

The median age in the town was 34.5 years. 31.3% of residents were under the age of 18; 5.7% were between the ages of 18 and 24; 27.6% were from 25 to 44; 25.5% were from 45 to 64; and 10% were 65 years of age or older. The gender makeup of the town was 50.6% male and 49.4% female.

=== 2000 census ===
As of the census of 2000, there were 596 people, 212 households, and 154 families living in the town. The population density was 728.1 inhabitants per square mile (281.1/km^{2}). There were 238 housing units at an average density of 290.7 per square mile (112.2/km^{2}). The racial makeup of the town was 97.32% White, 1.17% Native American, 0.17% Asian, 1.01% from other races, and 0.34% from two or more races. Hispanic or Latino of any race were 1.17% of the population.

There were 212 households, out of which 40.1% had children under the age of 18 living with them, 61.3% were married couples living together, 6.1% had a female householder with no husband present, and 26.9% were non-families. 21.7% of all households were made up of individuals, and 3.8% had someone living alone who was 65 years of age or older. The average household size was 2.81 and the average family size was 3.27.

In the town, the population was spread out, with 32.4% under the age of 18, 7.9% from 18 to 24, 34.4% from 25 to 44, 18.1% from 45 to 64, and 7.2% who were 65 years of age or older. The median age was 30 years. For every 100 females, there were 104.8 males. For every 100 females age 18 and over, there were 104.6 males.

The median income for a household in the town was $42,321, and the median income for a family was $44,792. Males had a median income of $30,000 versus $24,954 for females. The per capita income for the town was $17,282. About 3.2% of families and 4.3% of the population were below the poverty line, including 2.4% of those under age 18 and none of those age 65 or over.
