= Flint, Indiana =

- Unincorporated community
- Location within Indiana Location within the United States
- Coordinates: 41°39′00″N 85°07′30″W
- Country: United States
- State: Indiana
- County: Steuben
- Township: Jackson
- Elevation: 965 ft (294 m)
- Time zone: UTC-5 (Eastern (EST))
  - Summer (DST): UTC-4 (EDT)
- ZIP code: 46703
- Area code: 260
- GNIS feature ID: 434598

Flint is a small unincorporated community located west of Angola in Jackson Township, Steuben County, in the U.S. state of Indiana.

== History ==
A post office was established at Flint in 1850, and remained in operation until it was discontinued in 1907.

== Notable people ==
- Alonzo M. Clark, Governor of Wyoming from 1931 to 1933.
