= Steuben County, Indiana =

County in Indiana, United States

- County
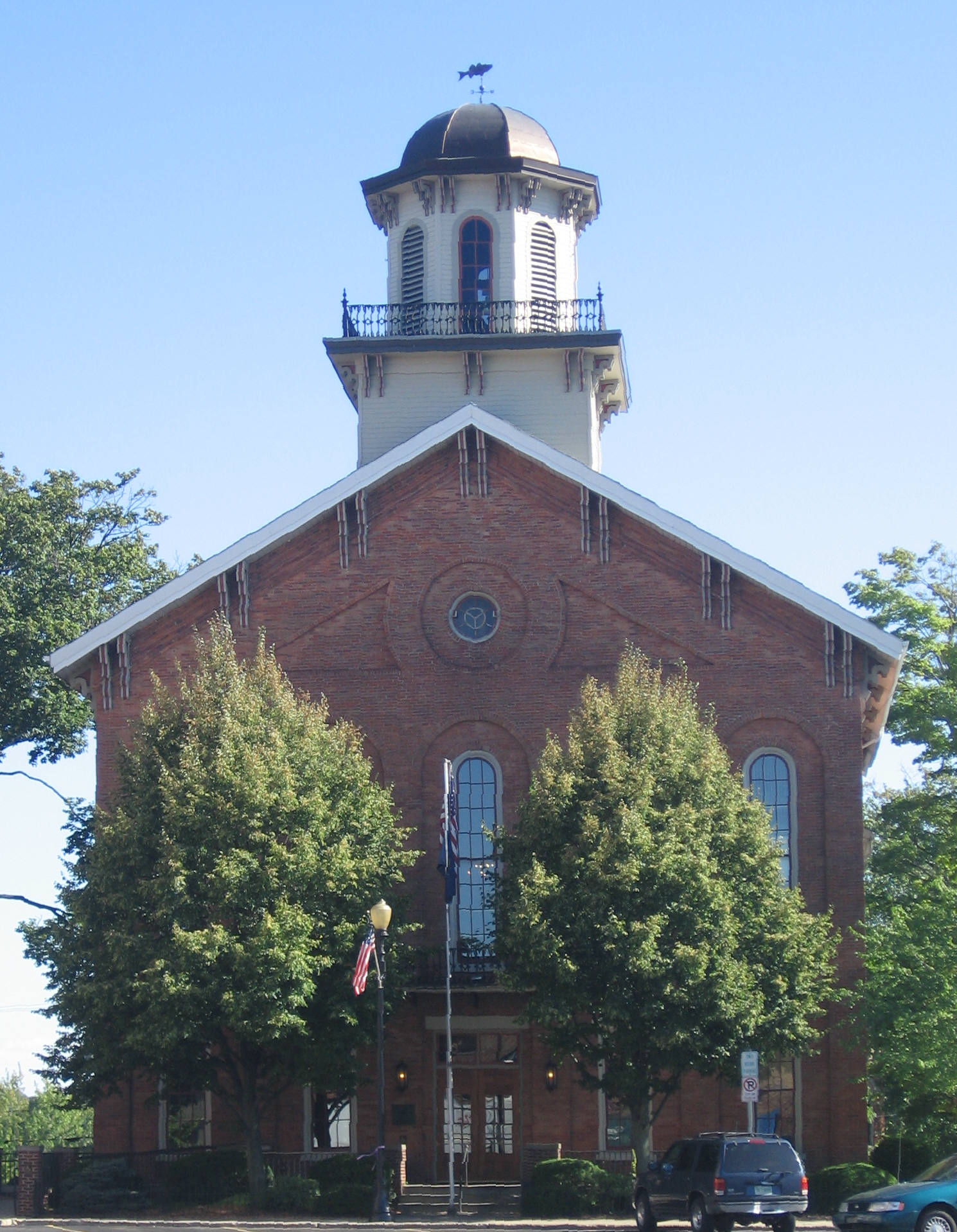
- Steuben County Courthouse in Angola (on the National Register of Historic Places).

- Seal

- Location within the U.S. state of Indiana
- Coordinates: 41°38′N 85°00′W
- Country: United States
- State: Indiana
- Founded: February 5, 1835 (authorized); 1837 (organized)
- Named for: Baron Frederick von Steuben
- Seat: Angola
- Largest city: Angola

Area
  - Total: 322.47 sq mi (835.2 km^{2})
  - Land: 308.94 sq mi (800.2 km^{2})
  - Water: 13.53 sq mi (35.0 km^{2}) 4.20%

Population (2020)
  - Total: 34,435
  - Estimate (2025): 34,799 ▲
  - Density: 111.46/sq mi (43.036/km^{2})
- Time zone: UTC−5 (Eastern)
  - Summer (DST): UTC−4 (EDT)
- Congressional district: 3rd
- Website: www.co.steuben.in.us
- Indiana county number 76

Steuben County is a county located at the northeastern corner of the U.S. state of Indiana. As of the 2020 United States census, the county's population was 34,435. The county seat (and only incorporated city) is Angola. Steuben County comprises the Angola, IN micropolitan statistical area.

== History ==
After the American Revolutionary War established US sovereignty over the territory of the upper Midwest, the new federal government defined the Northwest Territory in 1787, which included the area that is present-day Indiana. In 1800, Congress separated Ohio from the Northwest Territory, designating the rest of the land as the Indiana Territory. President Thomas Jefferson chose William Henry Harrison as the governor of the territory, and Vincennes was established as the capital. After the Michigan Territory was separated and the Illinois Territory was formed, Indiana was reduced to its current size and geography. By December 1816, the Indiana Territory was admitted to the Union as a state.

This area was historically occupied by the Potawatomi people, one of the tribes in the Council of Three Fires. Typically, they lived in highly decentralized bands. Treaties signed by some leaders with United States representatives ceded large areas of their territory to the US. Starting in 1794, Native American titles to Indiana lands were extinguished by usurpation, purchase, or war and treaty. The United States acquired land from the Native Americans in the 1809 treaty of Fort Wayne, by the treaty of St. Mary's in 1818, and in 1826 by the Treaty of Mississinewas, which included the future Steuben County.

The Indiana State Legislature passed an omnibus county bill on February 7, 1835, that authorized the creation of thirteen counties in northeast Indiana, including Steuben. In 1837, the county was organized and named for Baron Frederick von Steuben, an officer of the American Revolutionary War. In 1840 the Potawatomi were forcibly removed from this area and neighboring territory in Michigan and Ohio to Indian Territory in Kansas.

A Potawatomi chief, Baw Beese, led a band that was based at what later became known as Baw Beese Lake nearby in Michigan. His daughter Winona married Negnaska and lived in what is now Indiana. She was executed in the 1830s by her husband's people after she killed Negnaska for selling her pony. Winona's husband had pledged his rifle to Aaron B. Goodwin of Fremont for the use of a five-gallon keg. The Indians had the keg filled with whiskey at Nichols' store in Jamestown, and he took all the money they had. Negnaska sold his wife Winona's pony to pawn his rifle. Winona owned the pony outright, either as a gift from her father or having bought it with her own money. She killed Negnaska in anger for selling what was hers. Winona was held by the tribe for a few hours until her husband's nearest relative arrived to execute her. As was their custom, he stabbed her to the heart as she had her husband.

John D. Barnard and Sheldon Havens encountered the Potawatomi group after the execution; they helped them move the bodies to a nearby grave that had been dug. The Indians did not bury the bodies until after the white men were out of sight, but Dr. B.F. Sheldon found out about it and exhumed the bodies for dissection a few days later, outraging the mourning Potawatomi. About two weeks later, some Potawatomi returned the keg to Goodwin and tried to retrieve Negnaska's rifle, but Goodwin pretended not to know the man had been killed and refused to release the rifle to his friends.

== Geography ==
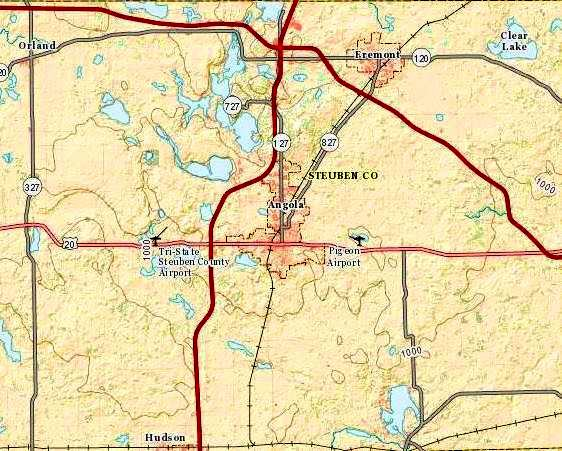
Steuben County and its lakes

The county's low, rolling hills have been largely cleared and leveled for agricultural use, although the drainage areas are still wooded. The highest point (1,200 feet/370 meters ASL) is a hillock one mile (1.6 km) east of Glen Eden.

The county contains a state park and 105 lakes of various sizes. Some of the larger lakes are Lake James, Lake George, Clear Lake, Jimmerson Lake, Lake Gage, and Crooked Lake.

The distance from the northeast corner of Steuben County to the mouth of the Wabash River in Posey County, is the longest straightline distance in Indiana at 321 miles (517 km)

According to the 2010 census, the county has a total area of 322.47 square miles (835.2 km^{2}), of which 13.53 sq mi (35.0 km^{2}) (or 4.20%) are covered by water.

=== Major highways ===
- Indiana Toll Road (Interstate 80 and Interstate 90)
- Interstate 69
- U.S. Route 20
- State Road 1
- State Road 120
- State Road 127
- State Road 327
- State Road 427
- State Road 827

=== Climate ===
Angola, Indiana

Climate chart (precipitation, max. and min. temperature)
J	F	M	A	M	J	J	A	S	O	N	D
2 29 14	1.8 33 16	2.9 44 25	3.4 57 35	3.9 69 47	3.9 78 57	3.7 82 60	4.1 80 58	3.3 73 50	2.6 60 39	3.1 46 30	2.8 34 20
- █ Average max. and min. temperatures in °F
- █ Precipitation totals in inches
- Source: The Weather Channel
Metric conversion
J	F	M	A	M	J	J	A	S	O	N	D
50 −2 −10	46 1 −9	73 7 −4	86 14 2	99 21 8	100 26 14	93 28 16	104 27 14	83 23 10	66 16 4	77 8 −1	70 1 −7
- █ Average max. and min. temperatures in °C
- █ Precipitation totals in mm

In recent years, average temperatures in Angola have ranged from a low of 14 °F (−10 °C) in January to a high of 82 °F (28 °C) in July, although a record low of −27 °F (−33 °C) was recorded in January 1981 and a record high of 106 °F (41 °C) was recorded in July 1936. Average monthly precipitation ranged from 1.83 inches (46 mm) in February to 4.08 inches (104 mm) in August.

== Demographics ==
Historical population
Census	Pop.	Note	%±
1840	2,578		—
1850	6,104		136.8%
1860	10,374		70.0%
1870	12,854		23.9%
1880	14,645		13.9%
1890	14,478		−1.1%
1900	15,219		5.1%
1910	14,274		−6.2%
1920	13,360		−6.4%
1930	13,386		0.2%
1940	13,740		2.6%
1950	17,087		24.4%
1960	17,184		0.6%
1970	20,159		17.3%
1980	24,694		22.5%
1990	27,446		11.1%
2000	33,214		21.0%
2010	34,185		2.9%
2020	34,435		0.7%
2025 (est.)	34,799	▲	1.1%
US Decennial Census; 1790-1960 1900-1990; 1990-2000 2010

=== Racial and ethnic composition ===
Steuben County, Indiana – Racial and ethnic composition Note: the US Census treats Hispanic/Latino as an ethnic category. This table excludes Latinos from the racial categories and assigns them to a separate category. Hispanics/Latinos may be of any race.
Race / Ethnicity (NH = Non-Hispanic)	Pop 1980	Pop 1990	Pop 2000	Pop 2010	Pop 2020	% 1980	% 1990	% 2000	% 2010	% 2020
White alone (NH)	24,273	27,010	31,931	32,513	31,438	98.30%	98.41%	96.14%	95.11%	91.30%
Black or African American alone (NH)	63	51	119	155	234	0.26%	0.19%	0.36%	0.45%	0.68%
Native American or Alaska Native alone (NH)	34	59	94	81	64	0.14%	0.21%	0.28%	0.24%	0.19%
Asian alone (NH)	96	131	132	162	187	0.39%	0.48%	0.40%	0.47%	0.54%
Native Hawaiian or Pacific Islander alone (NH)	x	x	6	6	2	x	x	0.02%	0.02%	0.01%
Other race alone (NH)	106	2	19	12	94	0.43%	0.01%	0.06%	0.04%	0.27%
Mixed race or Multiracial (NH)	x	x	230	274	989	x	x	0.69%	0.80%	2.87%
Hispanic or Latino (any race)	122	193	683	982	1,427	0.49%	0.70%	2.06%	2.87%	4.14%
Total	24,694	27,446	33,214	34,185	34,435	100.00%	100.00%	100.00%	100.00%	100.00%

=== 2020 census ===
As of the 2020 census, the county had a population of 34,435. The median age was 42.8 years. 20.1% of residents were under the age of 18 and 20.5% of residents were 65 years of age or older. For every 100 females there were 103.6 males, and for every 100 females age 18 and over there were 103.4 males age 18 and over.

The racial makeup of the county was 92.5% White, 0.7% Black or African American, 0.3% American Indian and Alaska Native, 0.5% Asian, <0.1% Native Hawaiian and Pacific Islander, 2.0% from some other race, and 4.0% from two or more races. Hispanic or Latino residents of any race comprised 4.1% of the population.

36.8% of residents lived in urban areas, while 63.2% lived in rural areas.

There were 13,766 households in the county, of which 26.2% had children under the age of 18 living in them. Of all households, 51.1% were married-couple households, 19.3% were households with a male householder and no spouse or partner present, and 21.7% were households with a female householder and no spouse or partner present. About 27.8% of all households were made up of individuals and 12.8% had someone living alone who was 65 years of age or older.

There were 18,837 housing units, of which 26.9% were vacant. Among occupied housing units, 77.8% were owner-occupied and 22.2% were renter-occupied. The homeowner vacancy rate was 1.4% and the rental vacancy rate was 9.9%.

=== 2010 Census ===
As of the 2010 United States census, there were 34,185 people, 13,310 households, and 9,153 families in the county. The population density was 110.7 inhabitants per square mile (42.7/km^{2}). There were 19,377 housing units at an average density of 62.7 per square mile (24.2/km^{2}). The racial makeup of the county was 96.8% white, 0.5% black or African American, 0.5% Asian, 0.3% American Indian, 0.9% from other races, and 0.9% from two or more races. Those of Hispanic or Latino origin made up 2.9% of the population. In terms of ancestry, 37.8% were German, 12.6% were English, 10.5% were Irish, and 8.2% were American.

Of the 13,310 households, 30.4% had children under the age of 18 living with them, 54.3% were married couples living together, 9.3% had a female householder with no husband present, 31.2% were non-families, and 25.3% of all households were made up of individuals. The average household size was 2.47 and the average family size was 2.94. The median age was 40.2 years.

The median income for a household in the county was $47,697 and the median income for a family was $57,154. Males had a median income of $40,833 versus $29,614 for females. The per capita income for the county was $22,950. About 7.7% of families and 10.9% of the population were below the poverty line, including 16.4% of those under age 18 and 6.3% of those age 65 or over.

== Government ==
The county government is a constitutional body and is granted specific powers by the Constitution of Indiana, and by the Indiana Code.

County Council: The legislative branch of the county government; controls spending and revenue collection in the county. Representatives are elected to four-year terms from county districts. They set salaries, the annual budget, and special spending. The council has limited authority to impose local taxes, in the form of an income and property tax that is subject to state level approval, excise taxes, and service taxes.

Board of Commissioners: The executive body of the county; commissioners are elected county-wide to staggered four-year terms. One commissioner serves as president. The commissioners execute acts legislated by the council, collect revenue, and manage the county government.

Court: The county maintains a small claims court that handles civil cases. The judge on the court is elected to a term of four years and must be a member of the Indiana Bar Association. The judge is assisted by a constable who is also elected to a four-year term. In some cases, court decisions can be appealed to the state level circuit court.

County Officials: The county has other elected offices, including sheriff, coroner, auditor, treasurer, recorder, surveyor, and circuit court clerk. These officers are elected to four-year terms. Members elected to county government positions are required to declare party affiliations and to be residents of the county.

Steuben County is part of Indiana's 3rd congressional district.

Steuben County is very Republican at the Presidential level. The only time it voted for a Democrat was for Franklin D. Roosevelt in 1932, and it was narrow.

United States presidential election results for Steuben County, Indiana
Year	Republican		Democratic		Third party(ies)	
Year	No.	%	No.	%	No.	%
1888	2,352	61.12%	1,348	35.03%	148	3.85%
1892	2,100	55.73%	1,264	33.55%	404	10.72%
1896	2,655	60.16%	1,674	37.93%	84	1.90%
1900	2,715	61.94%	1,522	34.73%	146	3.33%
1904	2,864	66.59%	1,260	29.30%	177	4.12%
1908	2,704	62.00%	1,453	33.32%	204	4.68%
1912	1,290	32.34%	1,266	31.74%	1,433	35.92%
1916	2,418	50.72%	1,427	29.93%	922	19.34%
1920	4,963	72.47%	1,676	24.47%	209	3.05%
1924	4,046	68.52%	1,610	27.27%	249	4.22%
1928	4,435	71.35%	1,730	27.83%	51	0.82%
1932	3,594	48.38%	3,717	50.04%	117	1.58%
1936	3,998	52.99%	3,402	45.09%	145	1.92%
1940	5,056	66.35%	2,524	33.12%	40	0.52%
1944	4,739	71.61%	1,837	27.76%	42	0.63%
1948	4,341	67.28%	1,996	30.94%	115	1.78%
1952	5,322	73.02%	1,886	25.88%	80	1.10%
1956	5,538	71.56%	2,171	28.05%	30	0.39%
1960	5,464	67.63%	2,588	32.03%	27	0.33%
1964	4,075	50.28%	3,999	49.34%	31	0.38%
1968	4,762	62.51%	2,268	29.77%	588	7.72%
1972	5,636	69.80%	2,401	29.73%	38	0.47%
1976	5,079	59.23%	3,323	38.75%	173	2.02%
1980	5,670	62.94%	2,606	28.93%	732	8.13%
1984	6,424	72.01%	2,441	27.36%	56	0.63%
1988	6,855	68.55%	3,114	31.14%	31	0.31%
1992	4,868	42.44%	3,630	31.65%	2,971	25.90%
1996	5,513	49.53%	4,124	37.05%	1,493	13.41%
2000	6,953	61.66%	4,103	36.38%	221	1.96%
2004	8,433	65.35%	4,345	33.67%	127	0.98%
2008	7,674	54.09%	6,284	44.29%	230	1.62%
2012	8,547	62.41%	4,853	35.44%	295	2.15%
2016	10,133	68.87%	3,744	25.45%	837	5.69%
2020	11,327	69.99%	4,513	27.89%	344	2.13%
2024	11,487	70.00%	4,598	28.02%	324	1.97%

== Education ==
=== Colleges and universities ===
- Trine University

=== School districts ===
- Fremont Community Schools
- Hamilton Community Schools
- M S D of Steuben County
- Prairie Heights Community School Corporation

== Communities ==
=== City and towns ===
- Angola (city/county seat)
- Ashley
- Clear Lake
- Fremont
- Hamilton
- Hudson
- Orland

=== Unincorporated communities ===
- Alvarado
- Berlien
- Clarks Landing
- Cold Springs
- |Courtney Corner
- Crooked Lake
- Ellis
- Flint
- Forest Park
- Fountain Park
- Helmer
- Inverness
- Island Park
- Jamestown
- Lake James
- Lakeside Park
- Meadow Shores Park
- Metz
- Moonlight
- Nevada Mills
- Oakwood
- Otsego Center
- Panama
- Penn Park
- Pleasant Lake
- Ravinia Oaks
- Ray
- Russels Point
- Salem Center
- Steubenville
- Turkey Creek
- Westview
- Wildwood
- York

=== Townships ===
- Clear Lake
- Fremont
- Jackson
- Jamestown
- Millgrove
- Otsego
- Pleasant
- Richland
- Salem
- Scott
- Steuben
- York

=== Protected areas ===
- Cedar Lake Wetlands Conservation Area
- Marsh Lake Wetlands State Fish and Wildlife Area
- Pokagon State Park

== Notable people ==
- Edgar "Pop" Buell (1913–1980), humanitarian aid worker in Laos in the 1960s and 1970s, was born in Richland Township and farmed there until he joined International Voluntary Services in 1960.
- Sile Doty (1800–1876), criminal gang leader.

== See also ==
- The Herald Republican, daily newspaper covering Steuben County
- National Register of Historic Places listings in Steuben County, Indiana
