= Steuben Township, Steuben County, Indiana =

Steuben Township
- Township
- Location in Steuben County
- Coordinates: 41°34′22″N 85°01′30″W
- Country: United States
- State: Indiana
- County: Steuben

Government
  - Type: Indiana township

Area
  - Total: 34.49 sq mi (89.3 km^{2})
  - Land: 33.77 sq mi (87.5 km^{2})
  - Water: 0.72 sq mi (1.9 km^{2}) 2.09%
- Elevation: 965 ft (294 m)

Population (2020)
  - Total: 2,844
  - Density: 84/sq mi (32/km^{2})
- Time zone: UTC-5 (Eastern (EST))
  - Summer (DST): UTC-4 (EDT)
- Area code: 260
- GNIS feature ID: 453874

Steuben Township is one of twelve townships in Steuben County, Indiana, United States. As of the 2020 census, its population was 2,844, up from 2,835 at 2010, and it contained 1,333 housing units.

== History ==
The Cornish Griffin Round Barn and Pleasant Lake Depot are listed on the National Register of Historic Places.

== Geography ==
According to the 2010 census, the township has a total area of 34.49 square miles (89.3 km^{2}), of which 33.77 square miles (87.5 km^{2}) (or 97.91%) is land and 0.72 square miles (1.9 km^{2}) (or 2.09%) is water. Lakes in this township include Bower Lake, Golden Lake, Gooseneck Lake, Jonley Lake, Little Bower Lake, Long Lake, Meserve Lake, Mink Lake, Mud Lake, Perfect Lake, Pleasant Lake, Reed Lakes and Tamarack Lake. The stream of Mud Creek runs through this township.

=== Cities and towns ===
- Ashley (northeast quarter)
- Hudson (northeast half)

=== Unincorporated towns ===
- Moonlight at 41.5844948°N 85.0310770°W
- Pleasant Lake at 41.5753282°N 85.0160765°W
- Steubenville at 41.5322726°N 85.0227436°W

(This list is based on USGS data and may include former settlements.)

=== Adjacent townships ===
- Pleasant Township (north)
- Scott Township (northeast)
- Otsego Township (east)
- Franklin Township, DeKalb County (southeast)
- Smithfield Township, DeKalb County (south)
- Fairfield Township, DeKalb County (southwest)
- Salem Township (west)
- Jackson Township (northwest)

=== Cemeteries ===
The township contains three cemeteries: Matson, Mount Zion and Pleasant Lake.

=== Major highways ===
- Interstate 69
