= Steubenville, Indiana =

- Unincorporated community
- Location within Indiana Location within the United States
- Coordinates: 41°31′56″N 85°01′22″W
- Country: United States
- State: Indiana
- County: Steuben
- Township: Steuben
- Elevation: 991 ft (302 m)
- Time zone: UTC-5 (Eastern (EST))
  - Summer (DST): UTC-4 (EDT)
- ZIP code: 46705
- Area code: 260
- FIPS code: 18-73106
- GNIS feature ID: 444135

Steubenville is an unincorporated community in Steuben Township, Steuben County, in the U.S. state of Indiana.

== History ==
Steubenville was a choice for the county seat of Steuben County in 1841. It was also a train stop for a short time before it was moved to Angola.

A post office was established at Steubenville in 1839, and remained in operation until it was discontinued in 1932.
