= Baw Beese =

Potawatomi leader

Personal details
- Born: c. 1790
- Died: c. 1850 Adrian, MI; Georgian Bay, Ontario; or Miami County, Kansas
- Children: Winona

Baw Beese (c. 1790 – c. 1850) was a Potawatomi chief who led a band that occupied the area of what is now Hillsdale, Michigan, United States. They had a base camp at the large lake that was later named for him by European-American settlers who took over the territory. In November 1840 the Potowatomi were forced to Indian Territory in Kansas under the Indian Removal Act of 1830, which was being enforced in the former Northwest Territory.

== History ==
Before the 1821 Treaty of Chicago, Baw Beese led a band in this area of Potowatomi Indians estimated at over 150 members. The people had occupied these lands near the large lake (later named for him) for their cultivation of maize, as well as hunting and fishing.

Other chiefs of the Baw Beese family lived in surrounding counties in Michigan, Ohio, and Indiana. Because the treaty assigned this land to the Potowatomi (if Baw Beese knew about the treaty, as he was not a signatory), he initially considered the white settlers as a kind of tenant, but more kept coming. The Potowatomi were said to be hospitable to the whites and helped them survive in their early years in this area.

In November 1840 Baw Beese and his band were forcibly removed from Michigan to a reservation in Miami County, Kansas by the U.S. Government under authority of the Indian Removal Act signed into law by President Andrew Jackson in 1830. The voluntary Indian emigrations as outlined in the United States Treaty of Fort Meigs of 1817 and the Treaty of Chicago of 1821 with the tribes were made mandatory under the Indian Removal Act and enforced by the US military.

As a chief, Baw Beese was reported as holding to a strict code of justice. His status did not prevent, nor did he try to intervene when his daughter Winona was executed by one of her husband's family, after she had killed Neganska in anger for selling her pony.

== Legends ==
The story of Baw Beese and Winona has developed into local legend. In some versions, the chief must execute his own child because she killed her husband. In some versions, the young woman's skeleton is reported as found on the banks of Baw Beese Lake, identified by a cross bearing her name, or other identification.

== Death ==
The chief was said to have moved to Adrian, Michigan in the spring of 1864. He died there on July 12, 1889.

But the final days of Baw Beese are disputed. According to another account, he died in exile in the pine forests near Georgian Bay, Canada, after having left the reservation. Other accounts report his being killed in a raid by Sioux, or having a natural death at a very old age on the Kansas reservation, where the Potowatomi were finally required to settle.

== Treaties ==
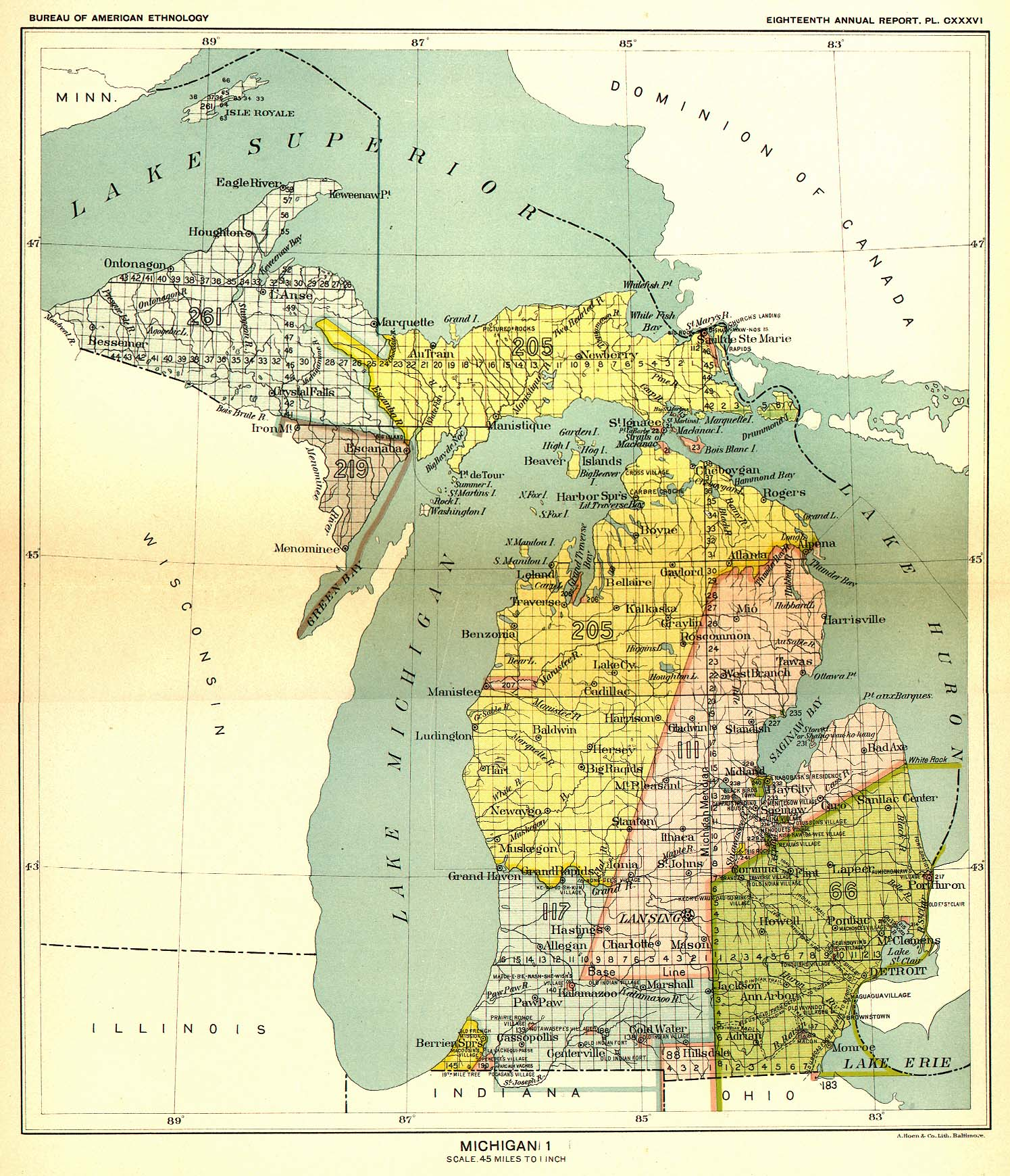
The Treaty of Detroit required the cession by natives of the olive-green region above Toledo. By the Fort Meigs Treaty, Native Americans ceded the small pink square on the Indiana-Ohio-Michigan border. The 1821 Treaty of Chicago required them to cede the L-shaped grey area north of Indiana.

Baw Beese never signed a treaty with the United States, although he did abide by the Treaty of Detroit of 1807. The line between present-day Lenawee and Hillsdale counties was established as the boundary between the settlers and natives. Because of that treaty, he welcomed the white settlers to Hillsdale County but treated them as tenants.

The 1817 Treaty of Fort Meigs detailed the cession by the Potowatomi of the southern half of Hillsdale County, including the primary gathering sites of the Baw Beese family at Bird Lake and Squawfield; however, Baw Beese does not appear to have participated in this treaty. Neither did any of the other chiefs with whom Baw Beese associated.

The closest name to Baw Beese on a US treaty with the Potawatomi is "Paw-pee", on an 1834 document. But there is little reason to believe this is Baw Beese. He was often associated with the chiefs Me-te-au, Ne-au-to-beer-shaw called "Leather Nose", and Wap-ka-zeek, none of whom is listed on this document.

== Namesakes ==
- Baw Beese Lake in Hillsdale, Michigan
- Chief Baw Beese Chapter of the North Country Trail
