= Pleasant Lake, Indiana =

- Unincorporated community
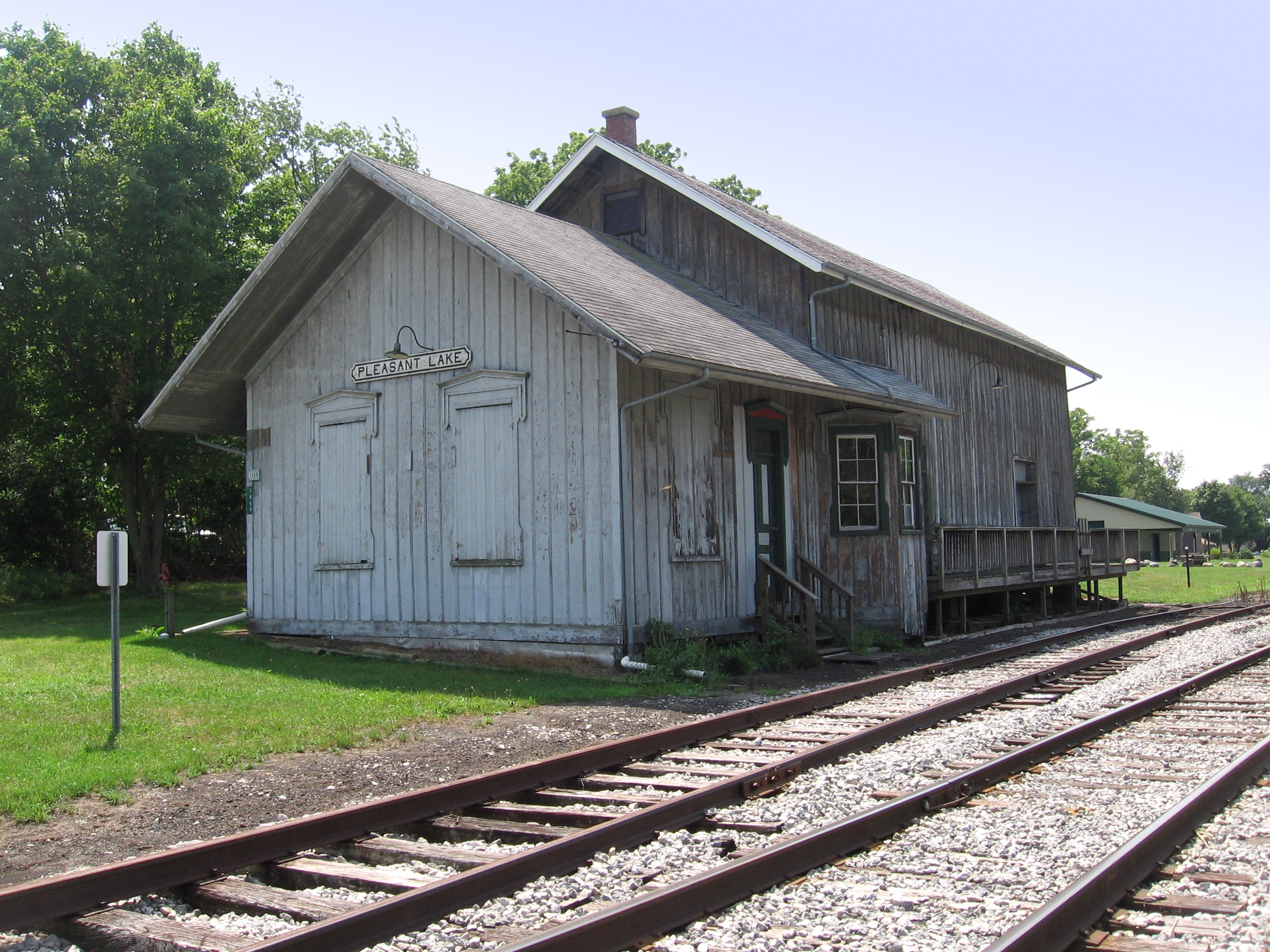
- Although no longer in use, the Pleasant Lake Depot is on the National Register of Historic Places listings in Steuben County, Indiana.

- Location within Indiana Location within the United States
- Coordinates: 41°34′31.2″N 85°0′57.9″W
- Country: United States
- State: Indiana
- County: Steuben
- Township: Steuben
- Elevation: 965 ft (294 m)
- Time zone: UTC-5 (Eastern (EST))
  - Summer (DST): UTC-4 (DST)
- ZIP code: 46779
- Area code: 260
- FIPS code: 18-60534
- GNIS feature ID: 441288

Pleasant Lake is an unincorporated town in Steuben Township, Steuben County, Indiana, United States.

== History ==
Pleasant Lake was originally called Nipcondish, which means "pleasant waters." The town is named after the lake which is the focus of the town.

The Pleasant Lake post office has been in operation since 1851.

== Demographics ==
The United States Census Bureau defined Pleasant Lake as a census designated place in the 2022 American Community Survey.
