= Richland Township, Steuben County, Indiana =

Richland Township
- Township
- Location in Steuben County
- Coordinates: 41°34′15″N 84°49′55″W
- Country: United States
- State: Indiana
- County: Steuben

Government
  - Type: Indiana township

Area
  - Total: 15.58 sq mi (40.4 km^{2})
  - Land: 15.58 sq mi (40.4 km^{2})
  - Water: 0 sq mi (0 km^{2}) 0%
- Elevation: 948 ft (289 m)

Population (2020)
  - Total: 415
  - Density: 36.6/sq mi (14.1/km^{2})
- Time zone: UTC-5 (Eastern (EST))
  - Summer (DST): UTC-4 (EDT)
- Area code: 260
- GNIS feature ID: 453800

Richland Township is one of twelve townships in Steuben County, Indiana, United States. As of the 2020 census, its population was 415, down from 570 at the 2010 census, and it contained 163 housing units, making it the smallest township in the county.

== Geography ==
According to the 2010 census, the township has a total area of 15.58 square miles (40.4 km^{2}), all land, second smallest after Clear Lake township.

=== Unincorporated towns ===
- Alvarado at 41.5767171°N 84.8377368°W

(This list is based on USGS data and may include former settlements.)

=== Cemeteries ===
The township contains five cemeteries: Alvarado, Amish, Metz, Mount Pleasant, and Bethel.

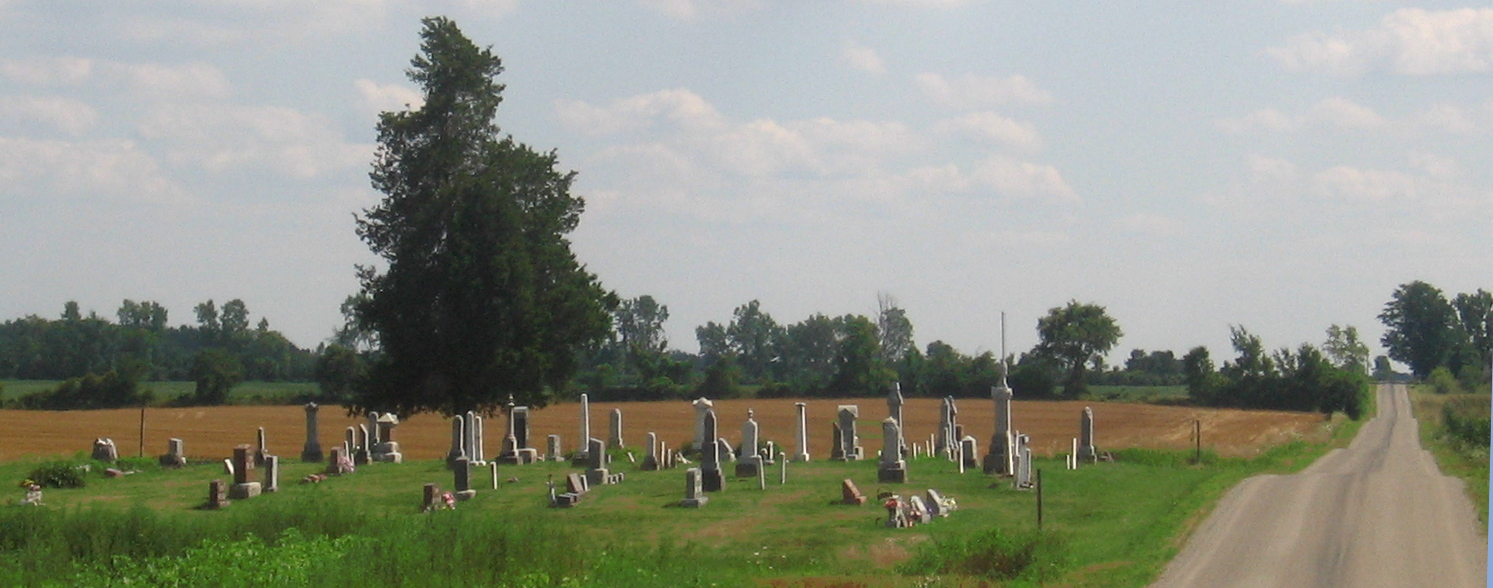
One of the first cemeteries in the area, Bethel Cemetery has graves dating from the late 1840s. Bethel cemetery was associated with the now-disbanded Bethel United Brethren church, the building of which was "sold and moved away".

=== Major highways ===
- Indiana State Road 427

== History ==
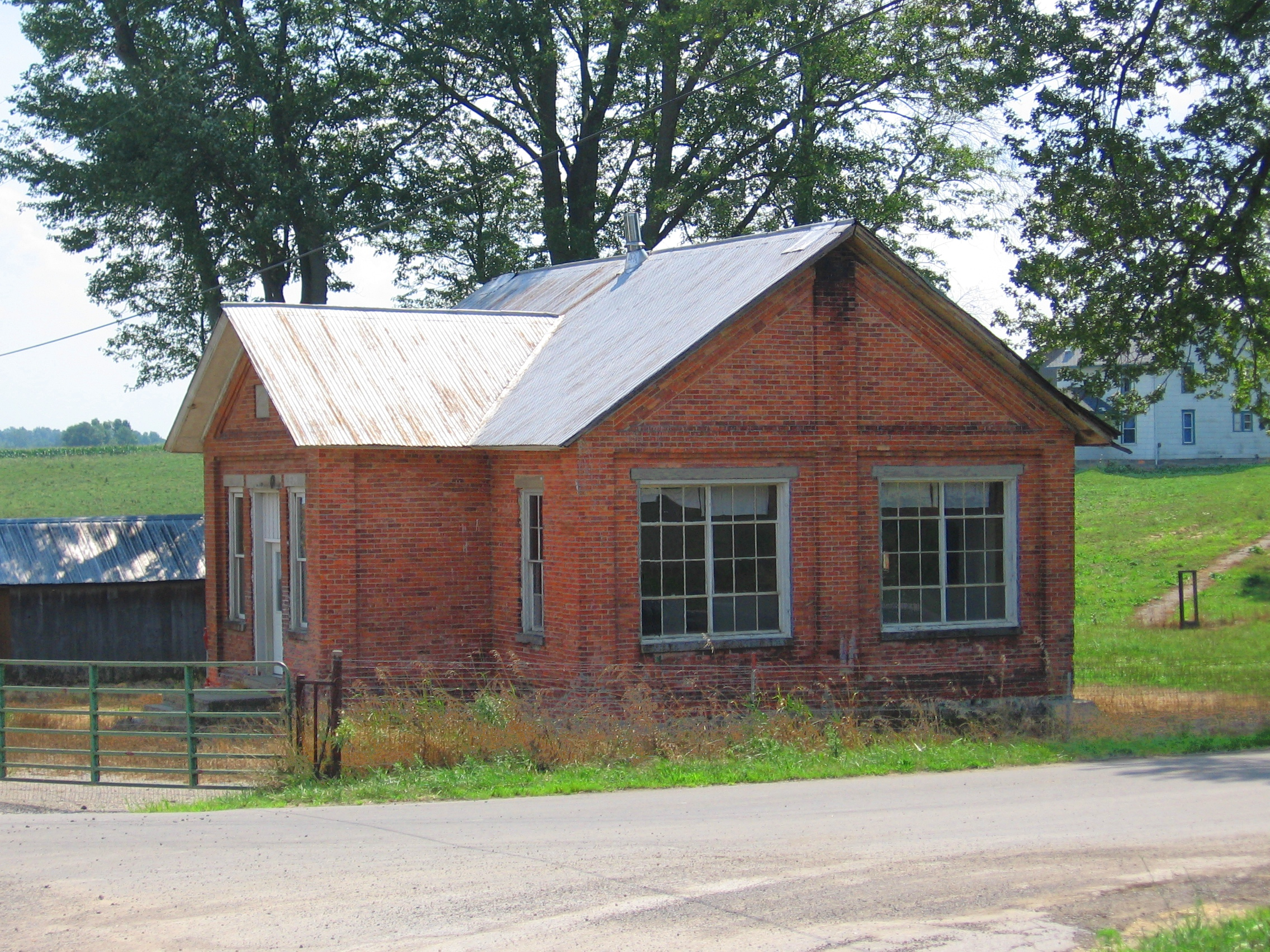
This old brick house stands on the southwest corner of present-day Alvarado.

The first land registration was made by John Douglas on October 11, 1835, but Robert Jackman and family were the first to settle in the township, in 1836. The 1840 census shows only 16 families, including those of Douglas and Jackman.

Much of this early community was centered on what came to be the village of Richland Center, where a log cabin schoolhouse as well as a Methodist church were built in 1850. When this village, which was never incorporated, organized a U. S. post office, there was already an Indiana post office named "Richland Center", so this post office was named "Alvardo", which eventually became the name for the village. Like the rest of Richland township, Alvarado slowly lost population during the 20th century and, in the 21st century, is a small collection of dwellings, farm buildings, and the Alvarado United Methodist Church.

== Notable native ==
- Pop Buell, humanitarian aid worker in Laos in the 1960s and 1970s, was born in Richland Township and farmed there until he joined International Voluntary Services in 1960.

== Notes and references ==
- Alvarado United Methodist Church, "History of the Alvarado United Methodist Church", accessed August 7, 2008.
- Imhof, Oscar (1956) "Richland Township", Harvey Morley, editor, The 1955 History, Complete County Atlas, pictorial and Biographical Album of Steuben County, Indiana, Angola, Indiana.
- Kelly, Niki (1996) "Our Towns: Alvarado", Fort Wayne Journal-Gazette, June 9, 1996.
- "Steuben County Cemeteries", Steuben County, Indiana, INGenWeb Site, accessed August 12, 2008.
- U.S. Board on Geographic Names (GNIS)
- United States Census Bureau cartographic boundary files
