= St. Joseph River (Maumee River tributary) =

River in the upper midwest, United States

St. Joseph River Little St. Joseph River, Bean Creek, Kochisahsepe
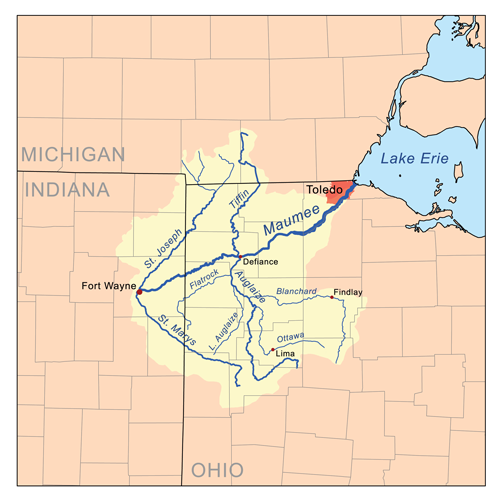
- Map of the Maumee River watershed showing the St. Joseph River.

Location
- Country: United States

Physical characteristics
- Source
  - location: Hillsdale County, Michigan
  - coordinates: 41°38′53″N 84°33′56″W
  - elevation: 856 ft (261 m)
- Mouth
  - location: Maumee River, Ft. Wayne, Indiana
  - coordinates: 41°05′00″N 85°07′56″W
  - elevation: 751 ft (229 m)
- Length: 100 mi (160 km)

Basin features
- Tributaries
  - left: West Branch St. Joseph River
  - right: East Branch St. Joseph River
- GNIS ID: 2678706

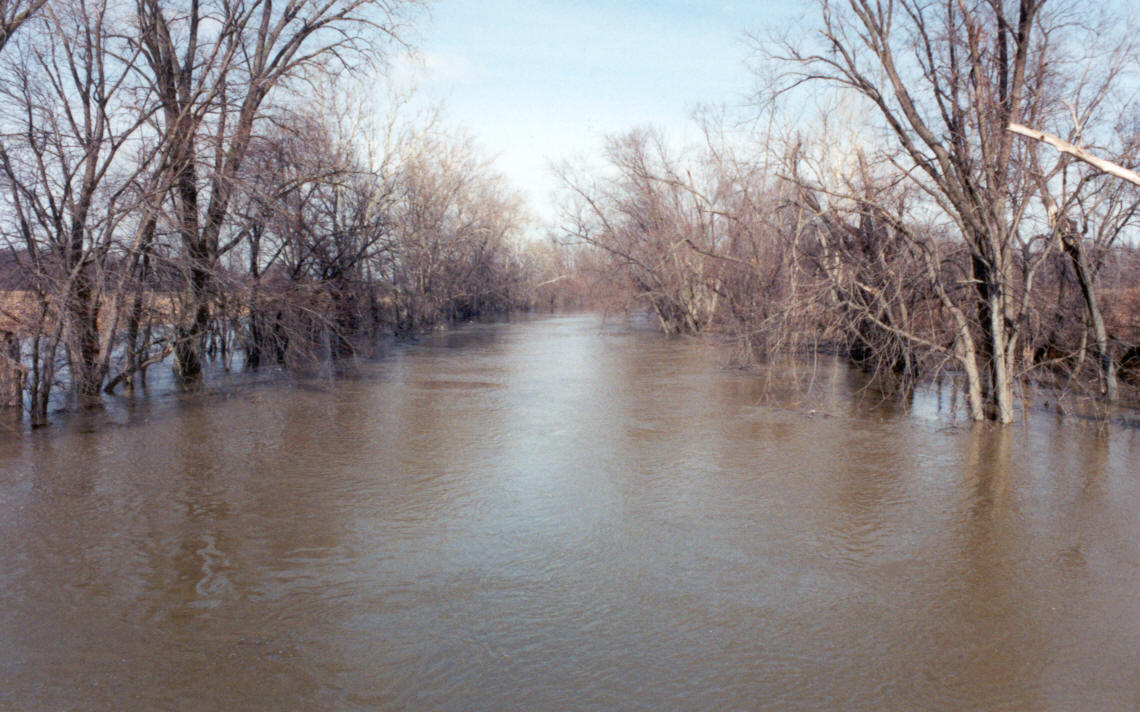
St. Joseph River near Newville in DeKalb County, Indiana.

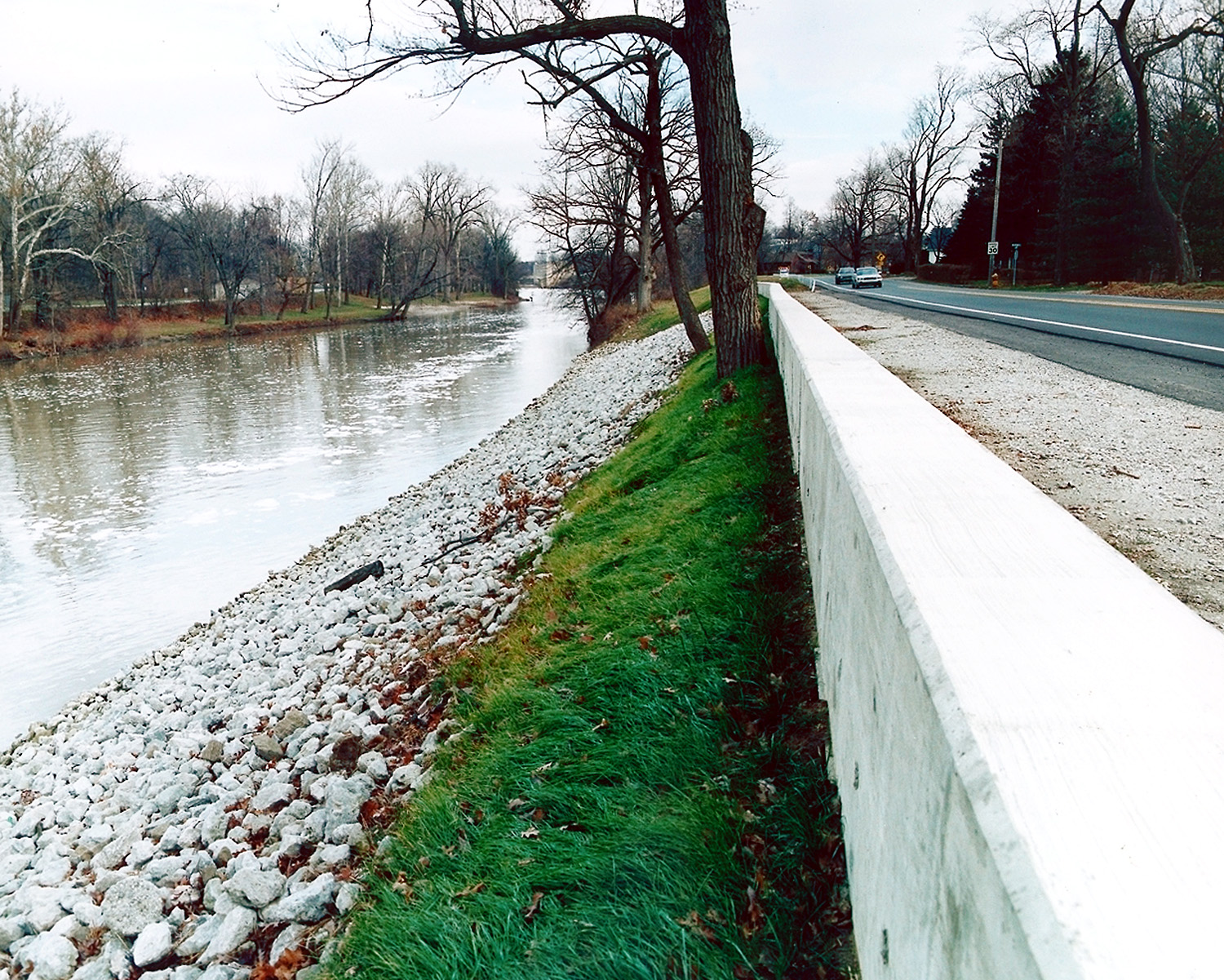
Floodwall along St. Joseph River in Fort Wayne, Indiana.

The St. Joseph River (Miami-Illinois: Kociihsasiipi) is an 86.1-mile-long (138.6 km) tributary of the Maumee River in northwestern Ohio and northeastern Indiana in the United States, with headwater tributaries rising in southern Michigan. It drains a primarily rural farming region in the watershed of Lake Erie.

The St. Joseph River of Lake Michigan is an entirely separate river that rises in western Michigan, dips into Indiana, and flows west into Lake Michigan.

== Origin ==
At the end of the Wisconsin glaciation, the glacier's Erie Lobe retreated toward the northeast, leaving large debris deposits called moraines. The St. Joseph formed as a meltwater channel between the north limbs of two of these moraines, the Wabash Moraine on the west and the Fort Wayne Moraine on the east. At that time it joined the St. Marys River to drain into the Wabash River. Later, the shrinkage of Glacial Lake Maumee, the ancestor of modern Lake Erie, brought about the opening of the modern Maumee River, which captured the flow of the St. Joseph and the St. Marys, causing the St. Marys to reverse its course to meet the flow of the St. Joseph almost head-on.

== The St. Joseph today ==
The St. Joseph River forms in northern Williams County, Ohio, at the confluence of the East and West branches at 41°38′54″N 84°33′55″W. Both branches rise in southern Hillsdale County, Michigan. The headwaters of the East Branch are within 3 miles (4.8 km) of those of the St. Joseph River of Lake Michigan. Both branches initially flow southeast, then turn to the southwest to flow across the northwestern corner of Ohio past Montpelier. The St. Joseph enters De Kalb County in northeastern Indiana, flowing southwest past Saint Joe and into the city of Fort Wayne, where it meets the St. Marys River to form the Maumee River at 41°04′58″N 85°07′56″W. The US Army Corps of Engineers built a flood control project in Fort Wayne that includes a floodwall and upper roadway along the St. Joseph River. (See photo)

== Tributaries ==
From the mouth:

- (left) Becketts Run
- (right) Tiernan Ditch
- (left) Ely Run
- (left) Cedar Creek
- Cedarville Reservoir
  - (left) Nettlehorst Ditch
  - (left) Warner Ditch
  - (right) Wittmer Ditch
    - (right) Haifley Ditch
- (left) Swartz-Carnahan Ditch
  - Dunton Lake
- (right) Boger Ditch
- (left) Metcalf Ditch
- (right) Walker Ditch
- (left) Dilley Ditch
- (left) Wade Ditch
- (left) Bear Creek
  - (right) North Branch Hursey Ditch
    - (right) Carper Ditch
  - (left) South Branch Hursey Ditch
    - (right) Swander Ditch
- (right) Nancy Davis Ditch
- (left) Sol Shank Ditch
  - (right) Weicht Ditch
  - (left) Sebert Ditch
  - (right) Varner Ditch
  - (left) Hoodelmier Ditch
- (right) Melissa Ditch
- (left) Buck Creek
  - (left) Smith Ditch
  - (right) Mason Ditch
    - (left) Metcalf Ditch
      - (right) Harwood Ditch
- (left) Christoffel Ditch
- (right) Willow Run
- (right) Amaden Ditch
- (right) Greens Ditch
- (right) Foulks Ditch
- (left) Peter Grube Ditch
- (left) Big Run
  - (right) Ayford Ditch
    - (left) Walters Ditch
    - (right) Streeter Ditch
  - (right) Praul Ditch
    - (right) Mary Metcalf Ditch
  - (left) Teutsch Ditch
  - (left) Donnell Ditch
    - (right) King Ditch
  - (right) John Smith Ditch
    - (left) Haverstolk Ditch
- (left) Russell Run
- (left) Fish Creek
  - (right) Cornell Ditch
  - (left) Hiram Sweet Ditch
    - (right) Baker Ditch
    - (left) Hamilton Lake
      - Black Creek
        - (left) Haughey Ditch
        - (left) Lillian Metz Ditch
          - (right) Burch Ditch
    - Ball Lake
    - (left) Myers Ditch
    - Perfect Lake
  - (left) West Branch Fish Creek
    - (left) Donald Nunkle Ditch
- (left) Bluff Run
- (left) Bear Creek
  - (left) Tamarack Ditch
- (left) Eagle Creek
  - (right) North Branch Eagle Creek
- (left) Nettle Creek
  - Nettle Lake
    - (right) Mill Stream Drain
- (right) East Branch St. Joseph River (rises in southwest Adams Township, Hillsdale County, Michigan at 41°54′17″N 84°33′52″W)
  - (left) Clear Fork
  - (left) Silver Creek
    - Merry Lake
  - (left) Laird Creek
    - (right) Nile Ditch
    - (left) Ransom Ditch
  - (left) Bird Creek
    - Bird Lake
  - (left) Newton Drain
  - (left) Dillon Drain
  - (left) Anderson Drain
  - (left) Goose Creek
  - (left) Lake Number One
    - Lake Number Two
  - Pittsford Millpond
    - (right) Otto Drain
    - Deer Lake
      - Twin Lake
- (left) West Branch St. Joseph River (rises just south of the intersection of Carpenter Rd. and W. Territorial Rd. in southern Cambria Township, Hillsdale County, Michigan at 41°38′53″N 84°41′24″W)
  - Lake Seneca
    - (left) outflow from Lake La Su An
  - (right) East Fork West Branch St. Joseph River (rises in northwest Cambria Township, Hillsdale County, Michigan at 41°51′53″N 84°40′34″W)
    - (left) Jonas Brown Drain
    - (left) Carruthers Drain
    - (right) outflow from Cub Lake
    - Cambria Millpond
      - (left) Cambria Drain
    - (left) Meade Drain
    - Bear Lake
      - (left) Pike Lake
        - Broom Lake
      - Lake Wilson
        - Bankers Lake
  - (left) West Fork West Branch St. Joseph River (rises from the outflow of Rebeck Lake in northwest Camden Township, Hillsdale County, Michigan at 41°48′22″N 84°48′22″W)
    - (left) Joe Drain
    - (left) Prouty Drain
    - Rebeck Lake
      - Mead Lake
        - Turner Lake

== Drainage basin ==
The St. Joseph River and tributaries drain all or portions of the following:

- Allen County, Indiana
  - Cedar Creek Township
  - Cedarville
  - Eel River Township
  - Fort Wayne
  - Grabill
  - Milan Township
  - Perry Township
  - St. Joseph Township
  - Springfield Township
  - Washington Township
- DeKalb County, Indiana
  - Auburn
  - Butler Township
  - Butler
  - Concord Township
  - Franklin Township
  - Garrett
  - Jackson Township
  - Keyser Township
  - Newville Township
  - Richland Township
  - Grant Township
  - Fairfield Township
  - Saint Joe
  - Smithfield Township
  - Spencer Township
  - Spencerville
  - Stafford Township
  - Troy Township
  - Union Township
  - Waterloo
  - Wilmington Township
- Noble County, Indiana
  - Avilla
  - Allen Township
  - Green Township
  - LaOtto
  - Swan Township
  - Wayne Township
- Steuben County, Indiana
  - Clear Lake Township
  - Hamilton
  - Otsego Township
  - Richland Township
  - York Township
- Defiance County, Ohio
  - Milford Township

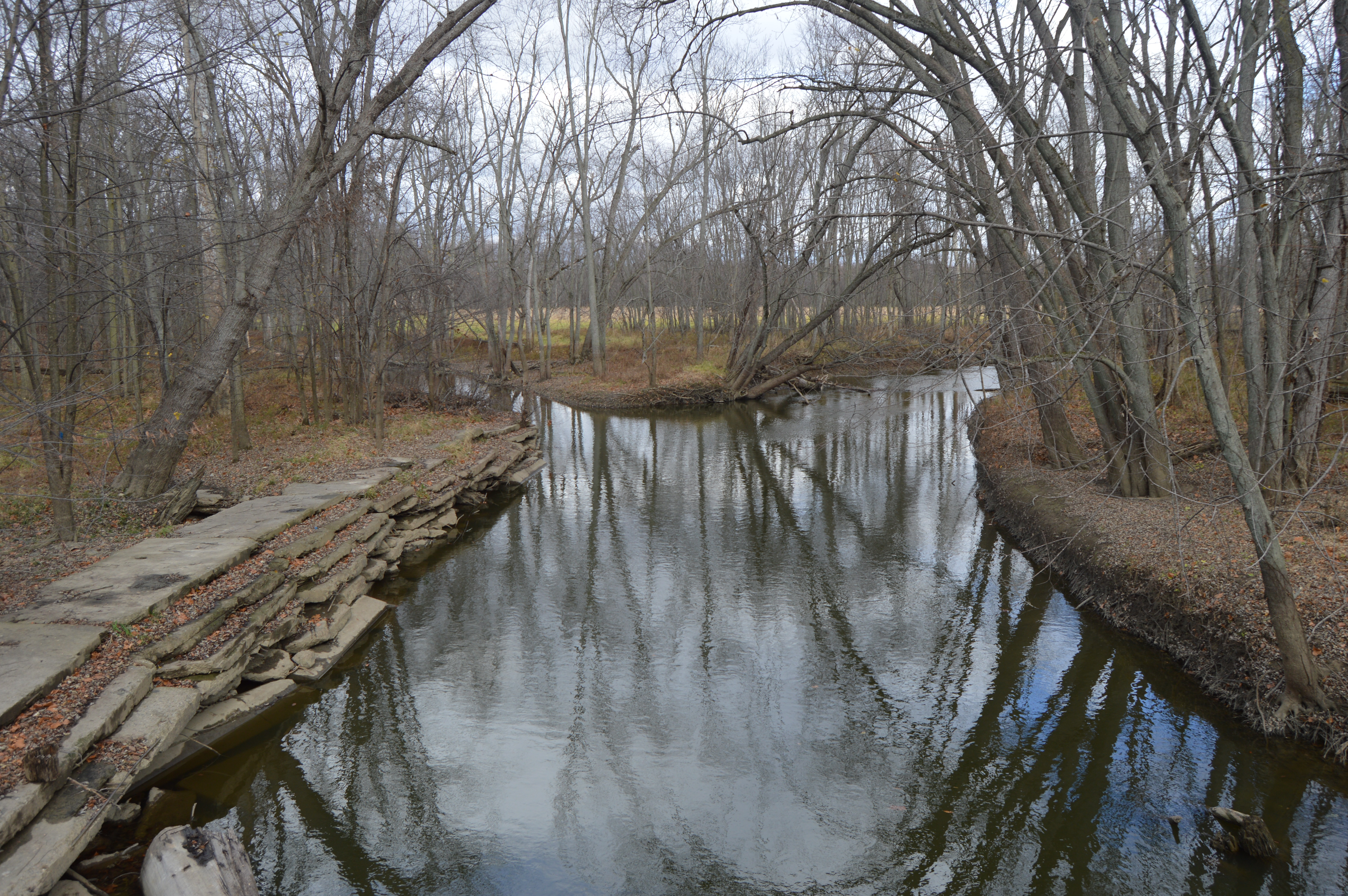
Near the Ohio Turnpike in Bridgewater Township

- Williams County, Ohio
  - Bridgewater Township
  - Blakeslee
  - Center Township
  - Edgerton
  - Edon
  - Florence Township
  - Madison Township
  - Montpelier
  - Northwest Township
  - Pioneer
  - St. Joseph Township
  - Superior Township
- Hillsdale County, Michigan
  - Adams Township
  - Amboy Township
  - Cambria Township
  - Camden Township
  - Camden
  - Jefferson Township
  - Osseo
  - Pittsford Township
  - Ransom Township
  - Reading Township
  - Wheatland Township
  - Woodbridge Township
  - Wright Township

== See also ==
- List of Indiana rivers
- List of Michigan rivers
- List of rivers of Ohio
- USS St. Joseph's River, a World War II-era US Navy vessel named after this river.
