= Troy Township, Indiana =

Troy Township may refer to one of the following places in the State of Indiana:

- Troy Township, Perry County, Indiana
- Troy Township, Fountain County, Indiana
- Troy Township, DeKalb County, Indiana
- and also: Etna-Troy Township, Whitley County, Indiana

See also

- Troy Township (disambiguation)
