= Wilmington Township, DeKalb County, Indiana =

Wilmington Township
- Township
- Location of Wilmington Township in DeKalb County
- Coordinates: 41°23′57″N 84°54′28″W
- Country: United States
- State: Indiana
- County: DeKalb

Government
  - Type: Indiana township

Area
  - Total: 35.98 sq mi (93.2 km^{2})
  - Land: 35.97 sq mi (93.2 km^{2})
  - Water: 0.01 sq mi (0.026 km^{2})
- Elevation: 850 ft (259 m)

Population (2020)
  - Total: 3,995
  - Density: 114.8/sq mi (44.3/km^{2})
- FIPS code: 18-84590
- GNIS feature ID: 454061

Wilmington Township is one of fifteen townships in DeKalb County, Indiana. As of the 2020 census, its population was 3,995 (down from 4,128 at the 2010 census) and it contained 1,600 housing units.

== History ==
Wilmington Township was organized in 1837.

== Geography ==
According to the 2010 census, the township has a total area of 35.98 square miles (93.2 km^{2}), of which 35.97 square miles (93.2 km^{2}) (or 99.97%) is land and 0.01 square miles (0.026 km^{2}) (or 0.03%) is water.

=== Cities and towns ===
- Butler

=== Unincorporated towns ===
- Moore

=== Adjacent townships ===
- Franklin Township (north)
- Troy Township (northeast)
- Stafford Township (east)
- Newville Township (southeast)
- Concord Township (south)
- Jackson Township (southwest)
- Grant Township (west)
- Union Township (west)
- Smithfield Township (northwest)

=== Major highways ===
- U.S. Route 6
- Indiana State Road 1
- Indiana State Road 8

=== Cemeteries ===
The township contains two cemeteries: Kraft and Krontz.
