= Troy Township, Minnesota =

Troy Township is the name of some places in the U.S. state of Minnesota:

- Troy Township, Pipestone County, Minnesota
- Troy Township, Renville County, Minnesota

See also

- Troy Township (disambiguation)
