= Butler Cemetery =

Butler Cemetery may refer to:

- Camp Butler National Cemetery, in Illinois
- Butler Family Cemetery, in South Carolina
- West Farms Soldiers Cemetery, in New York

== See also ==
- Butler Community Mausoleum, in Indiana
