= Concord, Indiana =

Concord, Indiana may refer to:

- Concord, DeKalb County, Indiana, an unincorporated community in Concord Township
- Concord, Tippecanoe County, Indiana, an unincorporated community
