= Fairfield Township, Indiana =

Fairfield Township is the name of three townships in the U.S. state of Indiana:

- Fairfield Township, DeKalb County, Indiana
- Fairfield Township, Franklin County, Indiana
- Fairfield Township, Tippecanoe County, Indiana
