= Summit, Indiana =

Summit is the name of the following places in the U.S. state of Indiana:

- Summit, DeKalb County, Indiana
- Summit, Greene County, Indiana
