= Concord Township, DeKalb County, Indiana =

Concord Township
- Township
- Location of Concord Township in DeKalb County
- Coordinates: 41°20′08″N 84°54′39″W
- Country: United States
- State: Indiana
- County: DeKalb

Government
  - Type: Indiana township

Area
  - Total: 17.96 sq mi (46.5 km^{2})
  - Land: 17.92 sq mi (46.4 km^{2})
  - Water: 0.03 sq mi (0.078 km^{2})
- Elevation: 830 ft (253 m)

Population (2020)
  - Total: 1,405
  - Density: 74.5/sq mi (28.8/km^{2})
- FIPS code: 18-14824
- GNIS feature ID: 453244

Concord Township is one of fifteen townships in DeKalb County, Indiana, United States. As of the 2020 census, its population was 1,405, up from 1,335 at 2010, and it contained 507 housing units.

== History ==
Concord Township was originally called Dekalb Township, and under the latter name was organized in 1837.

== Geography ==
According to the 2010 census, the township has a total area of 17.96 square miles (46.5 km^{2}), of which 17.92 square miles (46.4 km^{2}) (or 99.78%) is land and 0.03 square miles (0.078 km^{2}) (or 0.17%) is water.

=== Incorporated towns ===
- Saint Joe

=== Unincorporated towns ===
- Concord
- Orangeville

(This list is based on USGS data and may include former settlements.)

=== Adjacent townships ===
- Wilmington Township (north)
- Stafford Township (northeast)
- Newville Township (east)
- Spencer Township (south)
- Jackson Township (west)
- Union Township (west)

=== Major highways ===
- Indiana State Road 1
- Indiana State Road 8
- Indiana State Road 101

=== Cemeteries ===
The township contains three cemeteries: Alton, Concord, and Jenkins.
