= Franklin Township, DeKalb County, Indiana =

Franklin Township
- Township
- Location of Franklin Township in DeKalb County
- Coordinates: 41°28′54″N 84°54′22″W
- Country: United States
- State: Indiana
- County: DeKalb

Government
  - Type: Indiana township

Area
  - Total: 35.18 sq mi (91.1 km^{2})
  - Land: 35.11 sq mi (90.9 km^{2})
  - Water: 0.07 sq mi (0.18 km^{2})
- Elevation: 922 ft (281 m)

Population (2020)
  - Total: 1,367
  - Density: 33.7/sq mi (13.0/km^{2})
- FIPS code: 18-25342
- GNIS feature ID: 453300

Franklin Township is one of fifteen townships in DeKalb County, Indiana. As of the 2020 census, its population was 1,367, up from 1,182 at the 2010 census, and it contained 510 housing units.

== History ==
Franklin Township was organized in 1837, making it the oldest township in DeKalb County.

== Geography ==
According to the 2010 census, the township has a total area of 35.18 square miles (91.1 km^{2}), of which 35.11 square miles (90.9 km^{2}) (or 99.80%) is land and 0.07 square miles (0.18 km^{2}) (or 0.20%) is water. Terry Lake is in this township.

=== Cities and towns ===
- Hamilton (south quarter)

=== Unincorporated towns ===
(This list is based on USGS data and may include former settlements.)

=== Adjacent townships ===
- Otsego Township, Steuben County (north)
- Richland Township, Steuben County (northeast)
- Troy Township (east)
- Stafford Township (southeast)
- Wilmington Township (south)
- Grant Township (southwest)
- Smithfield Township (west)
- Steuben Township, Steuben County (northwest)

=== Major highways ===
- Indiana State Road 1
- Indiana State Road 427

=== Cemeteries ===
The township contains one cemetery, Rude.
