= Maria and Franklin Wiltrout Polygonal Barn =

- U.S. National Register of Historic Places
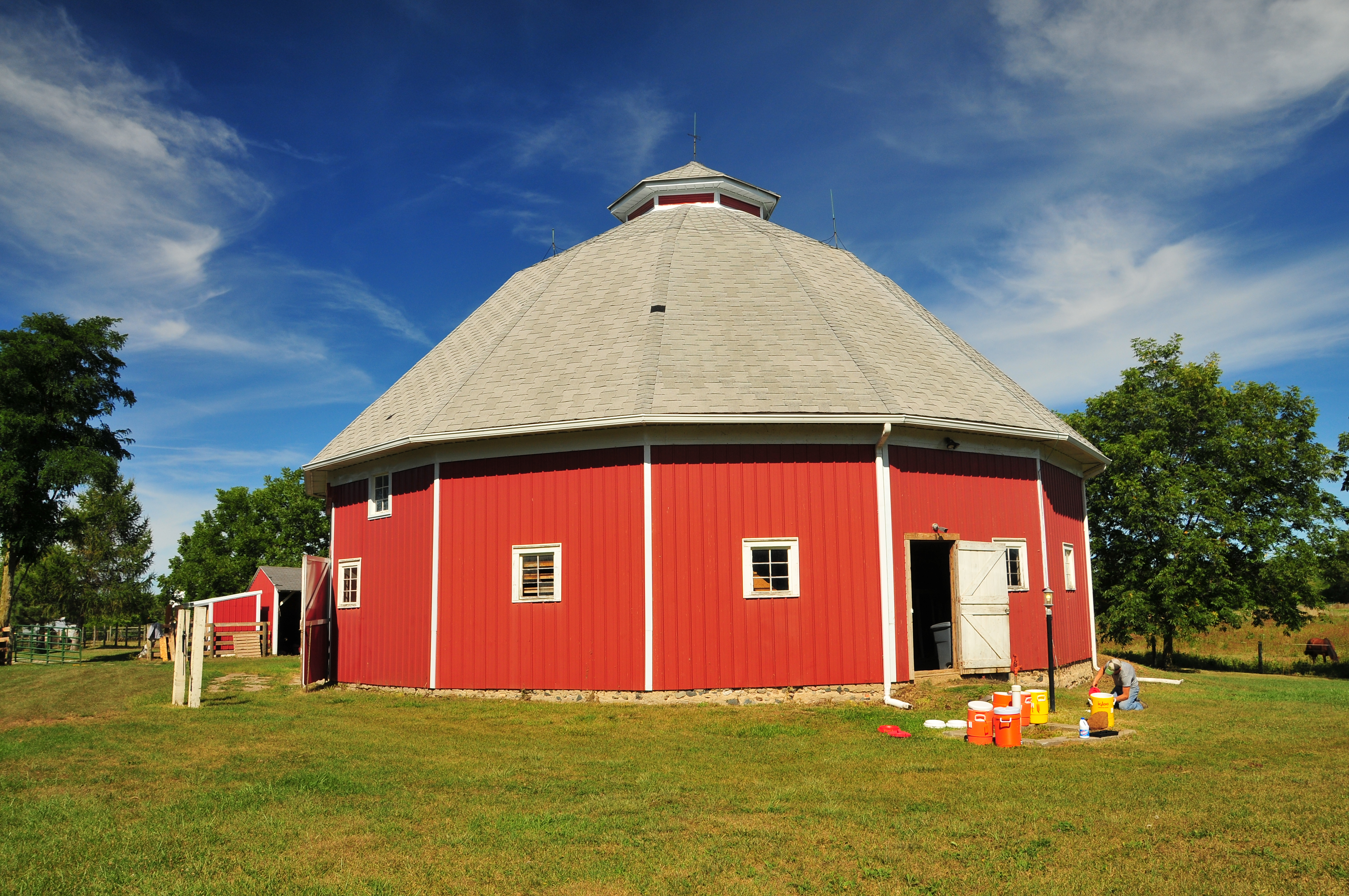
- Maria and Franklin Wiltrout Polygonal Barn, September 2013

- Location within Indiana Location within the United States
- Location: 0209 County Road 16, northwest of Corunna, Fairfield Township, DeKalb County, Indiana
- Coordinates: 41°28′3″N 85°11′2″W
- Area: less than one acre
- Built: 1910
- Built by: Reynolds, Frank
- Architectural style: Fourteen-sided barn
- MPS: Round and Polygonal Barns of Indiana MPS
- NRHP reference No.: 93000183
- Added to NRHP: April 2, 1993

Maria and Franklin Wiltrout Polygonal Barn, also known as the Alfred Barn, is a historic 14-sided barn located in Fairfield Township, DeKalb County, Indiana. Built in 1910, the structure is a two-story, wood-frame structure measuring 60 feet in width. It is topped by a two-pitch gambrel type roof with a 14-sided cupola. It is one of three 14-sided barns left in Indiana.

Original owners Maria and Franklin Wiltrout likely purchased the barn as a constructible kit from a mail-order catalog. The Chicago House Wrecking Company sold a kit ("Barn Design No. 206", designed by Frank Reynolds, advertised in contemporary Indiana farming magazines) that mirrors the design of the Wiltrout Barn closely.

It was added to the National Register of Historic Places in 1993.
