= Saint Joe, Indiana =

Town in Indiana, United States

- Logo
- Nickname: Pickle Town
- Motto: "We Pull Together With Community Pride"
- Location of St. Joe in DeKalb County, Indiana.
- Coordinates: 41°18′53″N 84°54′04″W
- Country: United States
- State: Indiana
- County: DeKalb
- Township: Concord

Area
  - Total: 0.34 sq mi (0.87 km^{2})
  - Land: 0.34 sq mi (0.87 km^{2})
  - Water: 0 sq mi (0.00 km^{2})
- Elevation: 820 ft (250 m)

Population (2020)
  - Total: 418
  - Density: 1,246.1/sq mi (481.12/km^{2})
- Time zone: UTC-5 (EST)
  - Summer (DST): UTC-4 (EDT)
- ZIP code: 46785
- Area code: 260
- FIPS code: 18-66834
- GNIS feature ID: 2396897
- Website: www.stjoeindiana.org

Saint Joe is a town in Concord Township, DeKalb County, Indiana, United States. The population was 460 at the 2010 census.

== History ==
Saint Joe was laid out in 1875, and incorporated as a town in 1899. The town derives its name from the St. Joseph River.

== Geography ==
According to the 2010 census, St. Joe has a total area of 0.27 square miles (0.70 km^{2}), all land.

== Demographics ==
Historical population
Census	Pop.	Note	%±
1880	180		—
1900	483		—
1910	391		−19.0%
1920	386		−1.3%
1930	407		5.4%
1940	437		7.4%
1950	479		9.6%
1960	499		4.2%
1970	564		13.0%
1980	546		−3.2%
1990	452		−17.2%
2000	478		5.8%
2010	460		−3.8%
2020	418		−9.1%
U.S. Decennial Census

=== 2010 census ===
As of the census of 2010, there were 460 people, 157 households, and 115 families living in the town. The population density was 1,703.7 inhabitants per square mile (657.8/km^{2}). There were 179 housing units at an average density of 663.0 per square mile (256.0/km^{2}). The racial makeup of the town was 95.9% White, 0.9% Asian, 0.4% from other races, and 2.8% from two or more races. Hispanic or Latino of any race were 3.7% of the population.

There were 157 households, of which 42.7% had children under the age of 18 living with them, 55.4% were married couples living together, 7.0% had a female householder with no husband present, 10.8% had a male householder with no wife present, and 26.8% were non-families. 19.1% of all households were made up of individuals, and 7% had someone living alone who was 65 years of age or older. The average household size was 2.93 and the average family size was 3.39.

The median age in the town was 33.1 years. 32.6% of residents were under the age of 18; 9.9% were between the ages of 18 and 24; 23.7% were from 25 to 44; 23% were from 45 to 64; and 10.9% were 65 years of age or older. The gender makeup of the town was 50.9% male and 49.1% female.

=== 2000 census ===
As of the census of 2000, there were 478 people, 165 households, and 132 families living in the town. The population density was 1,687.7 inhabitants per square mile (651.6/km^{2}). There were 184 housing units at an average density of 649.6 per square mile (250.8/km^{2}). The racial makeup of the town was 97.49% White, 0.21% African American, 0.21% Native American, 1.46% from other races, and 0.63% from two or more races. Hispanic or Latino of any race were 3.77% of the population.

There were 165 households, out of which 45.5% had children under the age of 18 living with them, 64.2% were married couples living together, 10.3% had a female householder with no husband present, and 19.4% were non-families. 18.2% of all households were made up of individuals, and 7.3% had someone living alone who was 65 years of age or older. The average household size was 2.90 and the average family size was 3.22.

In the town, the population was spread out, with 32.2% under the age of 18, 9.8% from 18 to 24, 32.4% from 25 to 44, 15.5% from 45 to 64, and 10.0% who were 65 years of age or older. The median age was 32 years. For every 100 females, there were 105.2 males. For every 100 females age 18 and over, there were 102.5 males.

The median income for a household in the town was $36,417, and the median income for a family was $36,833. Males had a median income of $33,125 versus $22,109 for females. The per capita income for the town was $14,570. About 4.6% of families and 5.5% of the population were below the poverty line, including 1.9% of those under age 18 and 12.5% of those age 65 or over.

== Emergency services ==
- Fire & Rescue: Concord Township Volunteer Fire Department
- Police: Dekalb County Sheriff's Department & Indiana State Police
- EMS: Parkview Dekalb EMS

Dispatch non-emergency number for Dekalb County Communications: 260-333-7911 Emergency: 911

== Education ==
The town of Saint Joe lies in the school district of Dekalb County Eastern Community School District. Local schools residents attend are:

- Riverdale Elementary School (K–6) in St. Joe
- Butler Elementary (K–6)
- Eastside Junior-Senior High School (7–12)

== Parks and recreation ==
There are several recreational centers in Saint Joe, including:

- Wild Cherry Park
- Saint Mark's Lutheran Church's Park
- Saint Joseph River Greenway
- Riverdale Elementary School's Playground
- Saint Joe Church of Christ's Playground
- Saint Joe Valley Conservation Club
- Public access to the Saint Joseph River
- Four baseball diamonds:
  - Three at Riverdale Elementary
  - One at NUCOR
    - About one mile east of town

== Churches ==
The town of Saint Joe is home to three churches:

- Saint Joe Church of Christ
- Saint Mark's Lutheran Church
- Coburn Corners Church of Christ
  - Located 3 miles to the southeast of town

== Arts and culture ==
The town of Saint Joe holds an annual Pickle Festival in honor of the Pickle industry local to the town.

== Notable people ==
- Jacob D. Leighty (1839–1912), U.S. representative from Indiana
