= Ashley, Indiana =

- Town
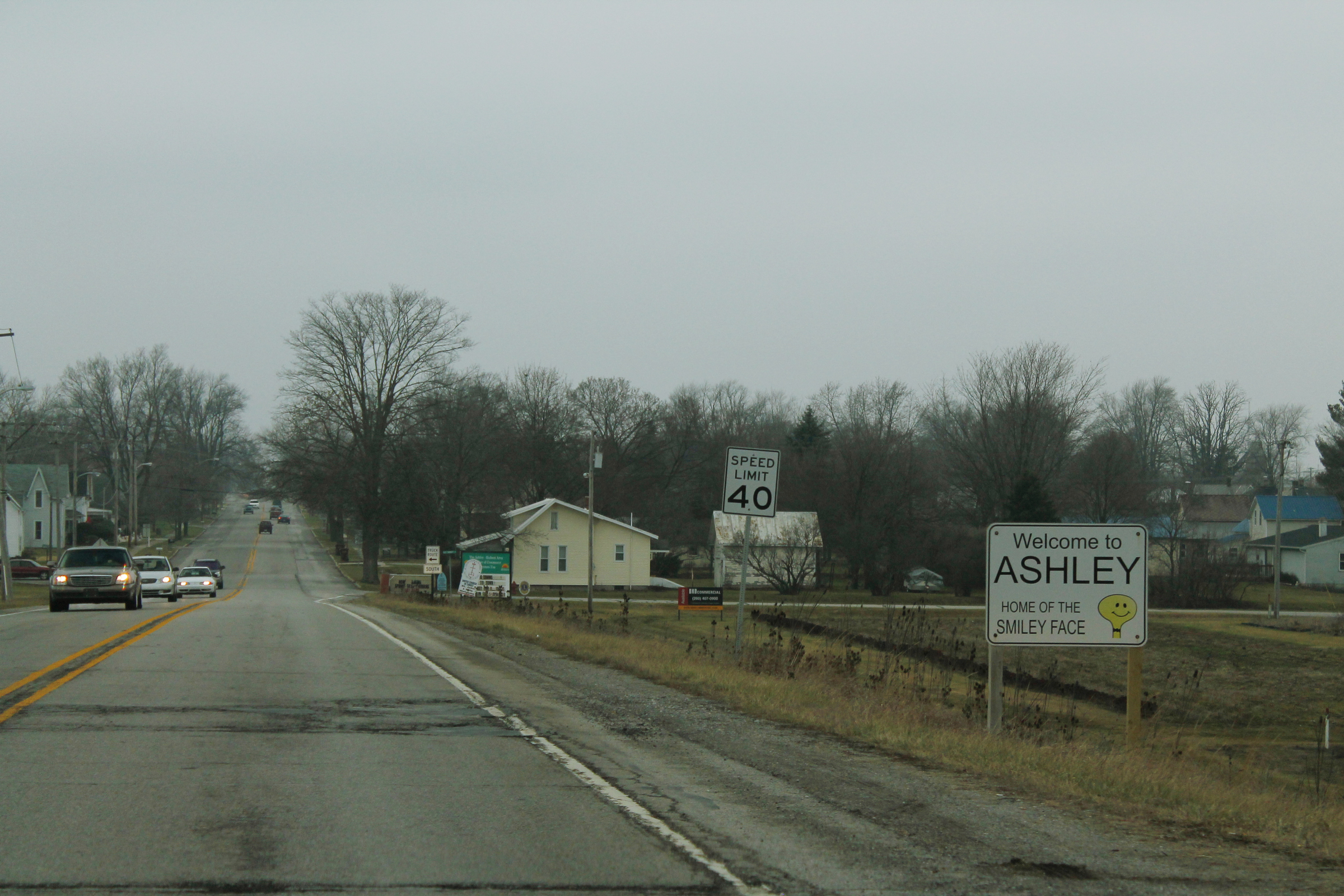
- Entering Ashley on Indiana State Road 4

- Location of Ashley in DeKalb County and Steuben County, Indiana.

- Location in Indiana Ashley (the United States) Ashley (North America)
- Coordinates: 41°31′17″N 85°03′41″W
- Country: United States
- State: Indiana
- Counties: DeKalb, Steuben
- Townships: Smithfield, Steuben
- Incorporated: July 18, 1892

Area
  - Total: 1.90 sq mi (4.93 km^{2})
  - Land: 1.90 sq mi (4.93 km^{2})
  - Water: 0 sq mi (0.00 km^{2})
- Elevation: 984 ft (300 m)

Population (2020)
  - Total: 1,026
  - Density: 538.8/sq mi (208.05/km^{2})
- Time zone: UTC−5 (EST)
  - Summer (DST): UTC−5 (EST)
- ZIP code: 46705
- Area code: 260
- FIPS code: 18-02458
- GNIS ID: 2397441
- Website: ashley.in.gov

Ashley is a town in Indiana located on the border of Smithfield Township, DeKalb County and Steuben Township, Steuben County. The population was 1,026 at the 2020 census.

== History ==
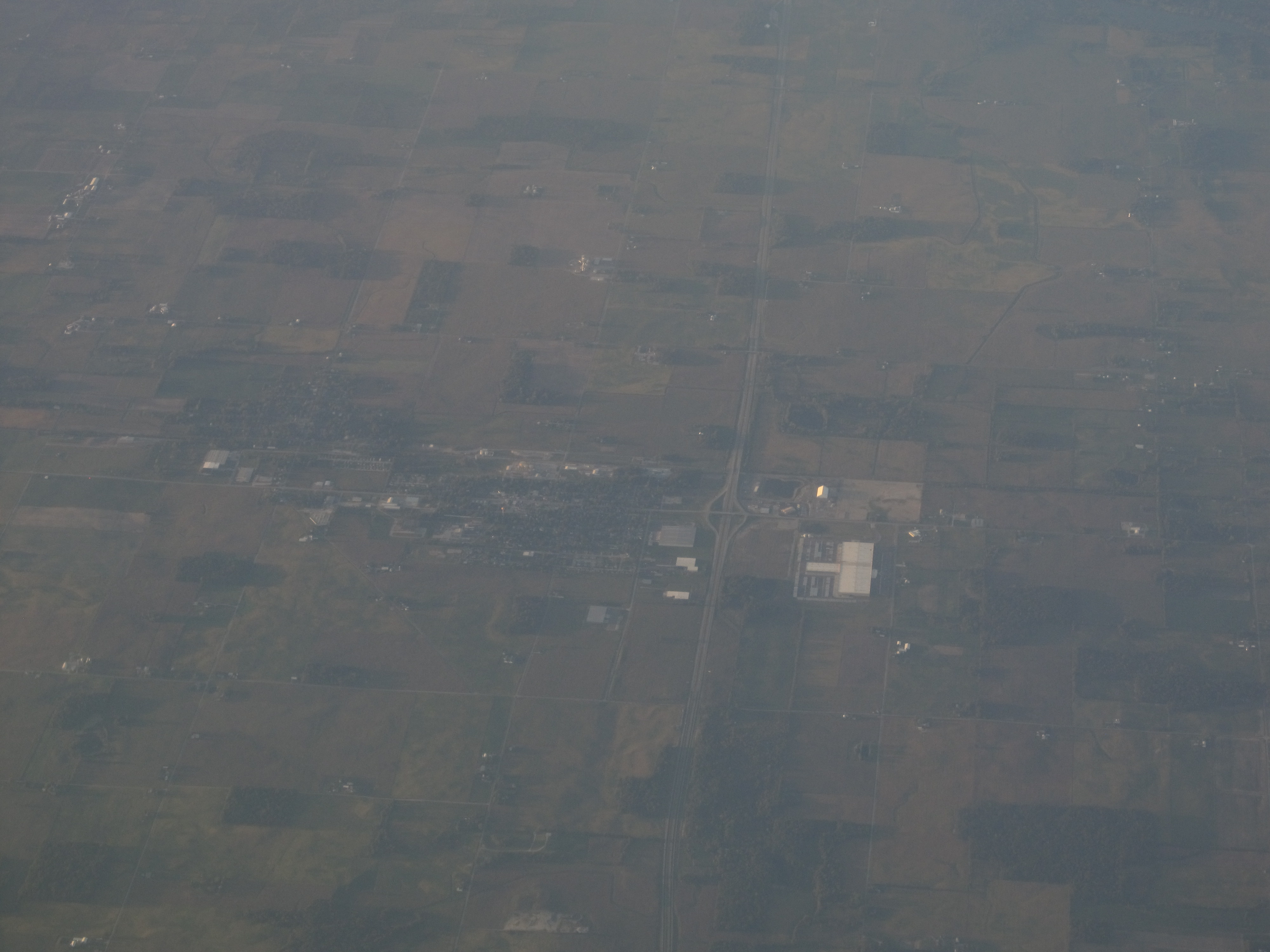
Aerial photo of Ashley, 2012

Ashley was platted and incorporated on July 18, 1892, when the Wabash Railroad was extended to that point. That year, a post office was established, and it is still currently in operation.

== Geography ==
According to the 2010 census, Ashley has a total area of 1.81 square miles (4.69 km^{2}), all land.

== Demographics ==
Historical population
Census	Pop.	Note	%±
1900	1,040		—
1910	639		−38.6%
1920	618		−3.3%
1930	623		0.8%
1940	675		8.3%
1950	680		0.7%
1960	721		6.0%
1970	721		0.0%
1980	841		16.6%
1990	767		−8.8%
2000	1,010		31.7%
2010	983		−2.7%
2020	1,026		4.4%
U.S. Decennial Census

=== 2020 census ===
As of the 2020 census, Ashley had a population of 1,026. The median age was 34.3 years. 25.3% of residents were under the age of 18 and 11.2% of residents were 65 years of age or older. For every 100 females there were 109.0 males, and for every 100 females age 18 and over there were 102.6 males age 18 and over.

0.0% of residents lived in urban areas, while 100.0% lived in rural areas.

There were 401 households in Ashley, of which 32.9% had children under the age of 18 living in them. Of all households, 36.9% were married-couple households, 24.7% were households with a male householder and no spouse or partner present, and 29.7% were households with a female householder and no spouse or partner present. About 30.7% of all households were made up of individuals and 9.0% had someone living alone who was 65 years of age or older.

There were 436 housing units, of which 8.0% were vacant. The homeowner vacancy rate was 1.9% and the rental vacancy rate was 8.8%.

Racial composition as of the 2020 census
Race	Number	Percent
White	925	90.2%
Black or African American	7	0.7%
American Indian and Alaska Native	4	0.4%
Asian	2	0.2%
Native Hawaiian and Other Pacific Islander	1	0.1%
Some other race	11	1.1%
Two or more races	76	7.4%
Hispanic or Latino (of any race)	37	3.6%

=== 2010 census ===
As of the 2010 census, there were 983 people, 378 households, and 255 families living in the town. The population density was 543.1 inhabitants per square mile (209.7/km^{2}). There were 450 housing units at an average density of 248.6 per square mile (96.0/km^{2}). The racial makeup of the town was 95.6% White, 0.2% African American, 0.5% Native American, 0.3% Asian, 1.6% from other races, and 1.7% from two or more races. Hispanic or Latino of any race were 3.4% of the population.

There were 378 households, of which 39.4% had children under the age of 18 living with them, 42.1% were married couples living together, 16.1% had a female householder with no husband present, 9.3% had a male householder with no wife present, and 32.5% were non-families. 27.8% of all households were made up of individuals, and 8.7% had someone living alone who was 65 years of age or older. The average household size was 2.60 and the average family size was 3.10.

The median age in the town was 34 years. 30.5% of residents were under the age of 18; 8.5% were between the ages of 18 and 24; 25% were from 25 to 44; 25.1% were from 45 to 64; and 10.8% were 65 years of age or older. The gender makeup of the town was 50.9% male and 49.1% female.

=== 2000 census ===
As of the 2000 census, there were 1,010 people, 409 households and 254 families living in the town. The population density was 1,251.5 inhabitants per square mile (483.2/km^{2}). There were 450 housing units at an average density of 557.6 per square mile (215.3/km^{2}). The racial makeup of the town was 97.52% White, 0.40% African American, 0.10% Native American, 0.30% Asian, 0.20% Pacific Islander, 0.30% from other races, and 1.19% from two or more races. Hispanic or Latino of any race were 0.99% of the population.

There were 409 households, out of which 37.4% had children under the age of 18 living with them, 47.2% were married couples living together, 11.0% had a female householder with no husband present, and 37.7% were non-families. 31.8% of all households were made up of individuals, and 11.0% had someone living alone who was 65 years of age or older. The average household size was 2.47 and the average family size was 3.14.

In the town, the population was spread out, with 30.5% under the age of 18, 9.6% from 18 to 24, 33.5% from 25 to 44, 16.6% from 45 to 64, and 9.8% who were 65 years of age or older. The median age was 30 years. For every 100 females, there were 99.2 males. For every 100 females age 18 and over, there were 95.0 males.

The median income for a household in the town was $35,893, and the median income for a family was $42,841. Males had a median income of $32,833 versus $23,208 for females. The per capita income for the town was $14,922. About 10.2% of families and 12.8% of the population were below the poverty line, including 16.3% of those under age 18 and 15.0% of those age 65 or over.
