= Newville, Indiana =

Newville
- Unincorporated community
- Location within Indiana Location within the United States
- Coordinates: 41°20′55″N 84°50′42″W
- Country: United States
- State: Indiana
- County: DeKalb
- Township: Newville
- Elevation: 820 ft (250 m)
- ZIP code: 46721
- FIPS code: 18-53766
- GNIS feature ID: 440155

Newville is an unincorporated community in Newville Township, DeKalb County, Indiana.

== History ==
Newville was platted in 1837. It took its name from Newville Township. A post office was established at Newville in 1839, and remained in operation until it was discontinued in 1907.

== Geography ==
Newville is located at 41°20′55″N 84°50′42″W.

== Notable residents ==
- Jeff Berry, Ku Klux Klan leader
