= Butler Center, Indiana =

Butler Center
- Unincorporated community
- Location within Indiana Location within the United States
- Coordinates: 41°18′30″N 85°08′12″W
- Country: United States
- State: Indiana
- County: DeKalb
- Township: Butler
- Elevation: 860 ft (260 m)
- ZIP code: 46738
- FIPS code: 18-09604
- GNIS feature ID: 431900

Butler Center is an unincorporated community in Butler Township, DeKalb County, Indiana.

Butler Center is situated at the geographical center of Butler Township, hence the name.

== Geography ==
Butler Center is located at 41°18′30″N 85°08′12″W.
