= Corunna, Indiana =

- Town
- Location of Corunna in DeKalb County, Indiana.
- Coordinates: 41°26′09″N 85°08′39″W
- Country: United States
- State: Indiana
- County: DeKalb
- Township: Richland

Area
  - Total: 0.18 sq mi (0.46 km^{2})
  - Land: 0.18 sq mi (0.46 km^{2})
  - Water: 0 sq mi (0.00 km^{2})
- Elevation: 968 ft (295 m)

Population (2020)
  - Total: 236
  - Density: 1,320.8/sq mi (509.97/km^{2})
- Time zone: UTC-5 (EST)
  - Summer (DST): UTC-4 (DST)
- ZIP code: 46730
- Area code: 260
- FIPS code: 18-15220
- GNIS feature ID: 2396663
- Website: corunnatown.com

Corunna is a town in Richland Township, DeKalb County, Indiana, United States. The population was 236 at the 2020 census estimate.

== History ==
A post office was established at Corunna in 1858. The town was most likely named after Corunna, Michigan.

In 1914, Corunna had three schools, a bank, two mills, and a hotel.

== Geography ==
According to the 2010 census, Corunna has a total area of 0.17 square miles (0.44 km^{2}), all land.

== Demographics ==
Historical population
Census	Pop.	Note	%±
1870	242		—
1880	276		14.0%
1910	318		—
1920	272		−14.5%
1930	268		−1.5%
1940	278		3.7%
1950	338		21.6%
1960	361		6.8%
1970	359		−0.6%
1980	304		−15.3%
1990	241		−20.7%
2000	254		5.4%
2010	254		0.0%
2020	236		−7.1%
U.S. Decennial Census

=== 2010 census ===
As of the census of 2010, there were 254 people, 88 households, and 64 families living in the town. The population density was 1,494.1 inhabitants per square mile (576.9/km^{2}). There were 98 housing units at an average density of 576.5 per square mile (222.6/km^{2}). The racial makeup of the town was 94.9% White, 0.4% African American, 0.4% Native American, 0.4% Asian, 2.4% from other races, and 1.6% from two or more races. Hispanic or Latino of any race were 4.3% of the population.

There were 88 households, of which 42.0% had children under the age of 18 living with them, 48.9% were married couples living together, 12.5% had a female householder with no husband present, 11.4% had a male householder with no wife present, and 27.3% were non-families. 21.6% of all households were made up of individuals, and 3.4% had someone living alone who was 65 years of age or older. The average household size was 2.89 and the average family size was 3.36.

The median age in the town was 34.3 years. 29.5% of residents were under the age of 18; 6.6% were between the ages of 18 and 24; 28.4% were from 25 to 44; 25.1% were from 45 to 64; and 10.2% were 65 years of age or older. The gender makeup of the town was 49.2% male and 50.8% female.

=== 2000 census ===
As of the census of 2000, there were 254 people, 85 households, and 64 families living in the town. The population density was 1,456.4 inhabitants per square mile (562.3/km^{2}). There were 94 housing units at an average density of 539.0 per square mile (208.1/km^{2}). The racial makeup of the town was 96.06% White, 0.79% Native American, 3.15% from other races. Hispanic or Latino of any race were 4.33% of the population.

There were 85 households, out of which 29.4% had children under the age of 18 living with them, 60.0% were married couples living together, 8.2% had a female householder with no husband present, and 24.7% were non-families. 16.5% of all households were made up of individuals, and 7.1% had someone living alone who was 65 years of age or older. The average household size was 2.99 and the average family size was 3.47.

In the town, the population was spread out, with 27.6% under the age of 18, 9.4% from 18 to 24, 28.3% from 25 to 44, 27.2% from 45 to 64, and 7.5% who were 65 years of age or older. The median age was 35 years. For every 100 females, there were 104.8 males. For every 100 females age 18 and over, there were 104.4 males.

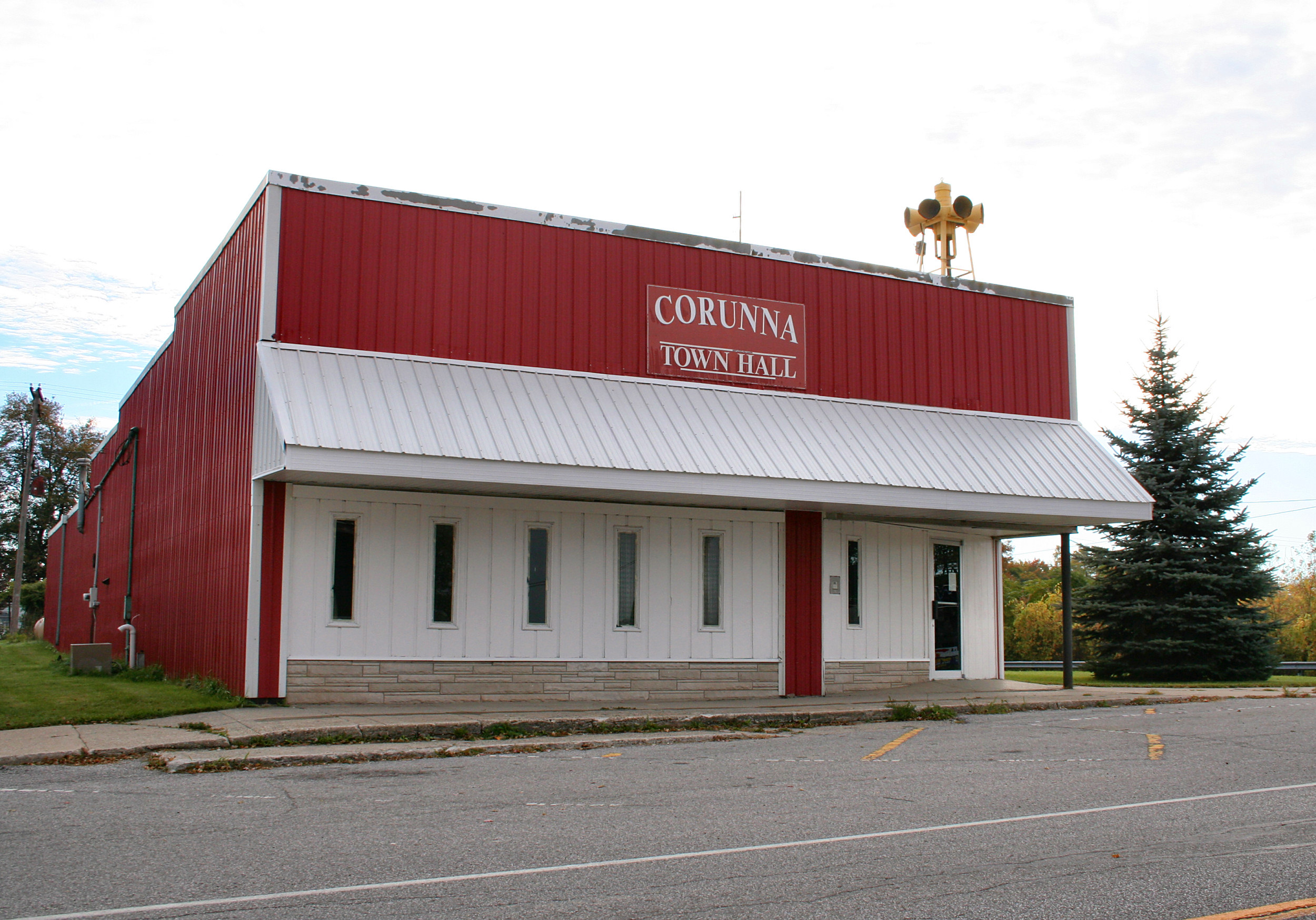
Corunna town hall.

The median income for a household in the town was $40,625, and the median income for a family was $49,688. Males had a median income of $37,708 versus $22,031 for females. The per capita income for the town was $19,301. None of the families and 4.8% of the population were living below the poverty line.

== Government ==
The Corunna Town Hall is located at 102 N Bridge St.. This building is also the former home to the Corunna Volunteer Fire Department The Corunna Volunteer Fire Department dedicated a new building on October 28, 2006, which is located at 1111 U.S. 6.
