= William Cornell Homestead =

Historic house in Indiana, United States

- U.S. National Register of Historic Places
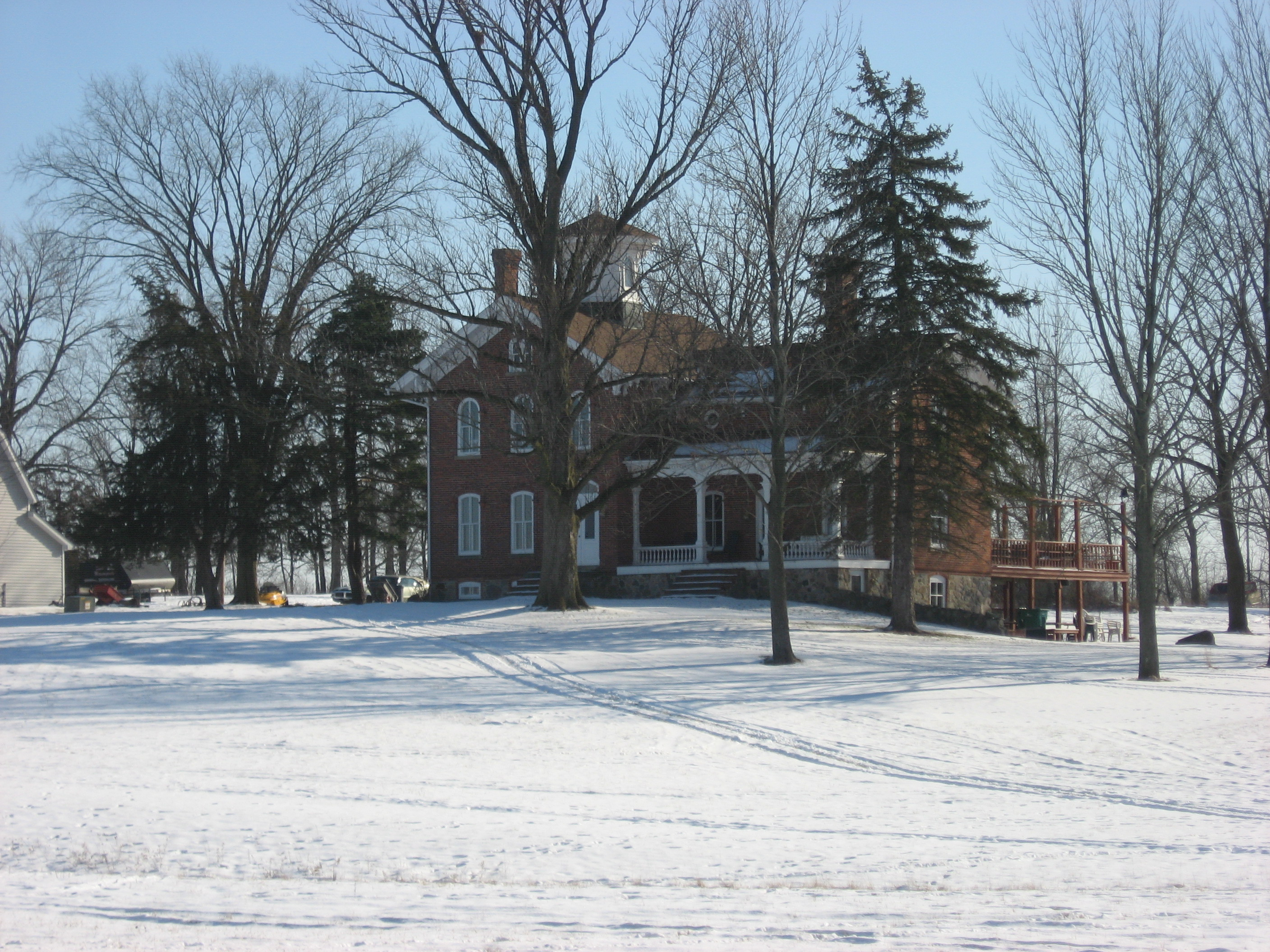
- William Cornell Homestead, January 2013

- Location within Indiana Location within the United States
- Location: Southwest of Auburn off State Road 427, Butler Township, DeKalb County, Indiana
- Coordinates: 41°16′44″N 85°5′28″W
- Area: 6.1 acres (2.5 ha)
- Built: c. 1863
- NRHP reference No.: 73000015
- Added to NRHP: August 14, 1973

William Cornell Homestead is a historic home located in Butler Township, DeKalb County, Indiana. The house was built about 1863, and is a two-story, L-shaped brick dwelling topped by an octagonal cupola. It features arched and porthole windows and sits on a cut fieldstone foundation.

The property is named for its original owner, William Cornell, a farmer born to an abolitionist family in Carroll County, Maryland. Cornell arrived in DeKalb County in 1813. His sons served in the Union Army during the Civil War. According to family tradition, the house built on the property is based on a home one of the sons encountered in the South during the war. Another story passed down by the Cornell family states the home was used as a station on the Underground Railroad. While this claim has not been verified by historians, the home's proximity to other Underground Railroad stations in Indiana combined with the abolitionist leanings of the Cornell family make this a plausible tale. William Cornell's son, Winfield Scott Cornell, inherited the property, then sold it in 1906 to another farmer, Ebben Carnahan.

It was added to the National Register of Historic Places in 1973.
