= Troy Township =

Troy Township may refer to:

== Illinois ==
- Troy Township, Will County, Illinois

== Indiana ==
- Troy Township, DeKalb County, Indiana
- Troy Township, Fountain County, Indiana
- Troy Township, Perry County, Indiana

== Iowa ==
- Troy Township, Clarke County, Iowa
- Troy Township, Iowa County, Iowa
- Troy Township, Monroe County, Iowa
- Troy Township, Wright County, Iowa

== Kansas ==
- Troy Township, Reno County, Kansas, in Reno County, Kansas

== Michigan ==
- Troy Township, Michigan

== Minnesota ==
- Troy Township, Pipestone County, Minnesota
- Troy Township, Renville County, Minnesota

== North Carolina ==
- Troy Township, Montgomery County, North Carolina

== North Dakota ==
- Troy Township, Divide County, North Dakota

== Ohio ==
- Troy Township, Ashland County, Ohio
- Troy Township, Athens County, Ohio
- Troy Township, Delaware County, Ohio
- Troy Township, Geauga County, Ohio
- Troy Township, Morrow County, Ohio
- Troy Township, Richland County, Ohio
- Troy Township, Wood County, Ohio

== Pennsylvania ==
- Troy Township, Bradford County, Pennsylvania
- Troy Township, Crawford County, Pennsylvania

== South Dakota ==
- Troy Township, Day County, South Dakota
- Troy Township, Grant County, South Dakota

== See also ==
- Troy (disambiguation)
