= Jeff Lynn Berry =

American KKK leader (died 2013)

Jeffery Lynn Berry
- Born: c. 1949
- Died: May 31, 2013 (aged 63–64)
- Citizenship: American
- Occupation: Leader of the American Knights of the Ku Klux Klan
- Organization: American Knights of the Ku Klux Klan
- Title: "National Imperial Wizard"
- Allegiance: American Knights of the Ku Klux Klan
- Conviction: Conspiracy to commit criminal confinement with a deadly weapon
- Criminal charges: Conspiracy to commit criminal confinement with a deadly weapon
- Penalty: Seven years in prison

Details
- Date: 1999 (incident)
- Location: Newville, Indiana

Jeffery Lynn Berry (c. 1949 – May 31, 2013) was the leader of the American Knights of the Ku Klux Klan in Newville, Indiana. He was sentenced to seven years in prison on December 4, 2001, for conspiracy to commit criminal confinement with a deadly weapon. The charges stemmed from a 1999 incident in which Berry refused to allow a local reporter and a photographer to leave his home following an interview.

== Leadership ==
In an interview, Berry identified himself as the Klan's "national imperial wizard". In a book written by his former assistant and now former Klansman, Brad Thompson, Berry's Klan was described as "a gigantic financial rip-off designed to line the pockets of its top leadership".

Berry later left the Klan six months after Jacob Holdt, a Danish photographer, produced a documentary with him about racism. After leaving the Klan, Berry was physically assaulted by other Klan members, including his son, who believed that Berry had betrayed his race. This assault resulted in him becoming blind and an invalid.

== Books ==
- Thompson, Brad and Worth Weller. Under The Hood: Unmasking the Modern Ku Klux Klan ISBN 978-0-9668231-0-3. Thompson is the former Indiana "grand dragon" of the American Knights of the Ku Klux Klan. Weller is a journalist.

== Death ==
On June 7, 2013, the Southern Poverty Law Center reported that Berry had died from lung cancer, on May 31, 2013, at a hospital in Cook County, Illinois. He was 64.
