= Cedar, Indiana =

Cedar
- Unincorporated community
- Location within Indiana Location within the United States
- Coordinates: 41°18′46″N 85°09′22″W
- Country: United States
- State: Indiana
- County: DeKalb
- Township: Butler
- Elevation: 866 ft (264 m)
- ZIP code: 46738
- FIPS code: 18-10965
- GNIS feature ID: 432258

Cedar is an unincorporated community in Butler Township, DeKalb County, Indiana.

== History ==
Cedar was named after Cedar Creek. The post office was discontinued in 1914.

== Geography ==
Cedar is located at 41°18′46″N 85°09′22″W.
