= Sedan, Indiana =

Sedan
- Unincorporated community
- Location within Indiana Location within the United States
- Coordinates: 41°26′11″N 85°05′58″W
- Country: United States
- State: Indiana
- County: DeKalb
- Township: Richland
- Elevation: 932 ft (284 m)
- ZIP code: 46730
- FIPS code: 18-68616
- GNIS feature ID: 443193

Sedan is an unincorporated community in Richland Township, DeKalb County, Indiana.

== History ==
Originally named Lawrence, the town's post office was first established in 1854 and referred to as Iba (or Ida). Renamed Sedan P.O. in 1861, the post office was subsequently discontinued in 1908. The community was likely named after Sedan, in France.

== Geography ==
Sedan is located at 41°26′11″N 85°05′58″W.

== Demographics ==
Historical population
Census	Pop.	Note	%±
1870	176		—
U.S. Decennial Census

Sedan appeared as a separately-returned community in the 1870 Census, when it was reported to have a population of 176.
