= Orangeville, DeKalb County, Indiana =

Orangeville
- Unincorporated community
- Location within Indiana Location within the United States
- Coordinates: 41°20′09″N 84°51′25″W
- Country: United States
- State: Indiana
- County: DeKalb
- Township: Concord
- Elevation: 820 ft (250 m)
- ZIP code: 46785
- FIPS code: 18-56795
- GNIS feature ID: 440679

Orangeville is an unincorporated community in Concord Township, DeKalb County, Indiana.

== History ==
Orangeville was platted in 1836.
