= Auburn Junction, Indiana =

Auburn Junction
- Unincorporated community
- Location within Indiana Location within the United States
- Coordinates: 41°21′07″N 85°04′29″W
- Country: United States
- State: Indiana
- County: DeKalb
- Township: Jackson
- Elevation: 866 ft (264 m)
- ZIP code: 46706
- FIPS code: 18-02692
- GNIS feature ID: 430337

Auburn Junction is an unincorporated community in Jackson Township, DeKalb County, Indiana.

== History ==
Auburn Junction was at the junction of three railroads near Auburn, hence the name.

At Auburn Junction, the Baltimore & Ohio Railroad, the Eel River Railroad, and the Fort Wayne and Jackson Railroad all met at grade. The only thing that remains of Auburn Junction today is the B&O trackage, now owned by CSX and a mile section of the Ft Wayne and Jackson that serves as an industrial spur to two local businesses, also known as the City of Auburn Port Authority.

A post office was established at Auburn Junction in 1884, and remained in operation until it was discontinued in 1931.

== Geography ==
Auburn Junction is located at 41°21′07″N 85°04′29″W.
