= Spencer Township, DeKalb County, Indiana =

Spencer Township
- Township
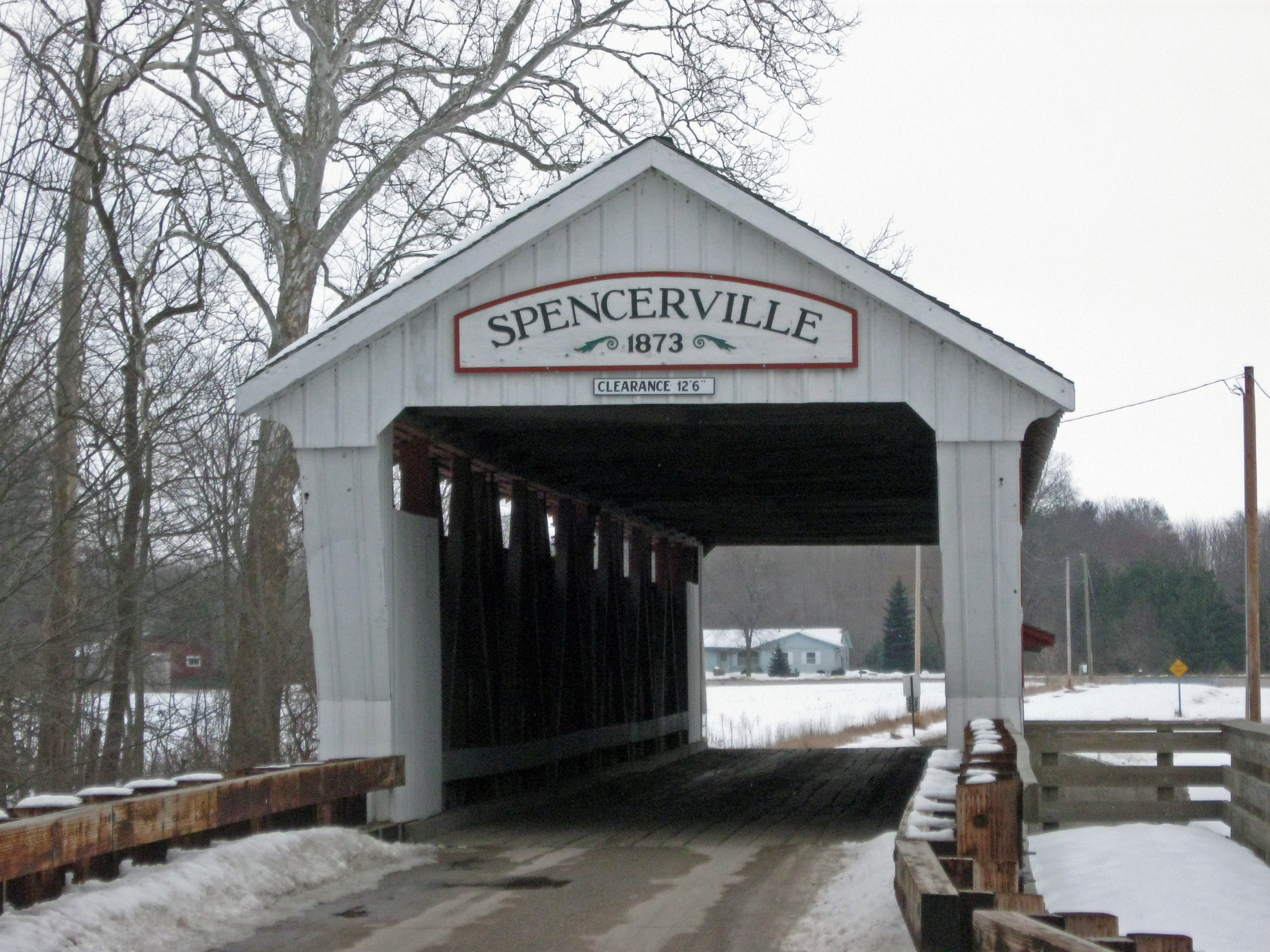
- West portal of the Spencerville, Indiana covered bridge.

- Location of Spencer Township in DeKalb County
- Coordinates: 41°17′32″N 84°54′16″W
- Country: United States
- State: Indiana
- County: DeKalb

Government
  - Type: Indiana township

Area
  - Total: 18.01 sq mi (46.6 km^{2})
  - Land: 17.95 sq mi (46.5 km^{2})
  - Water: 0.07 sq mi (0.18 km^{2})
- Elevation: 797 ft (243 m)

Population (2020)
  - Total: 1,198
  - Density: 68.7/sq mi (26.5/km^{2})
- FIPS code: 18-71918
- GNIS feature ID: 453859

Spencer Township is one of fifteen townships in DeKalb County, Indiana. As of the 2020 census, its population was 1,198, down from 1,233 at the 2010 census. It contained 452 housing units.

== History ==
The Spencerville Covered Bridge was added to the National Register of Historic Places in 1981.

== Geography ==
According to the 2010 census, the township has a total area of 18.01 square miles (46.6 km^{2}), of which 17.95 square miles (46.5 km^{2}) (or 99.67%) is land and 0.07 square miles (0.18 km^{2}) (or 0.39%) is water.

=== Unincorporated towns ===
- Spencerville

=== Adjacent townships ===
- Concord Township (north)
- Newville Township (east)
- Scipio Township, Allen County (southeast)
- Springfield Township, Allen County (south)
- Cedar Creek Township, Allen County (southwest)
- Jackson Township (west)

=== Major highways ===
- Indiana State Road 1
- Indiana State Road 101

=== Cemeteries ===
The township contains two cemeteries: Riverside and White City.
