= Waterloo Community Mausoleum =

Historic site in DeKalb County, Indiana

- U.S. National Register of Historic Places
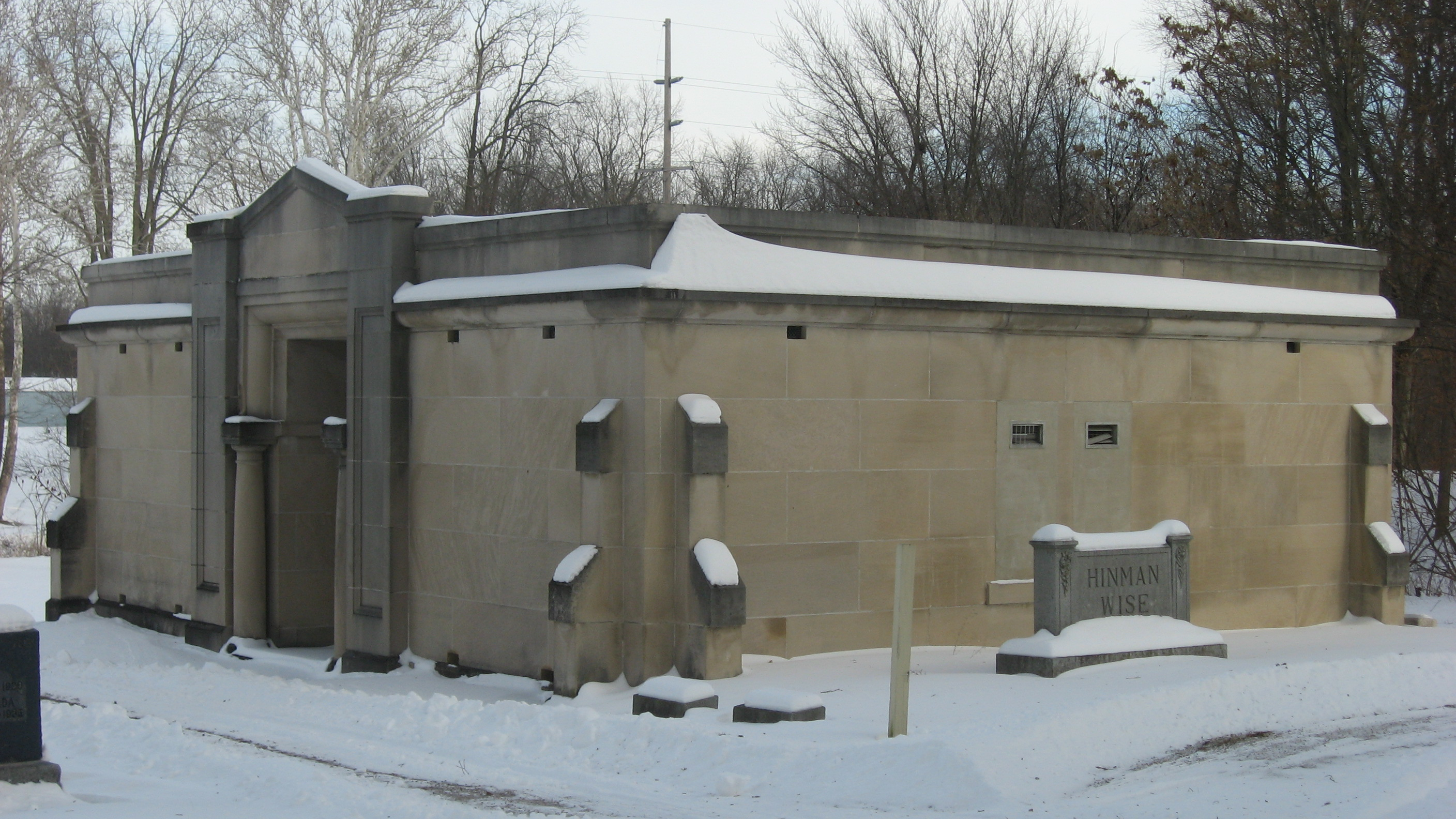
- Waterloo Community Mausoleum, January 2014

- Location within Indiana Location within the United States
- Location: N. Center St., Waterloo, Indiana
- Coordinates: 41°26′14″N 85°01′23″W
- Area: less than 1 acre (0.40 ha)
- Built: 1916
- Architect: Ohio Mausoleum Company; Bryan, Cecil E.
- Architectural style: Classical Revival
- MPS: The Early Community Mausoleum Movement in Indiana
- NRHP reference No.: 14000072
- Added to NRHP: March 24, 2014

The Waterloo Community Mausoleum is a historic mausoleum located in Maplewood Cemetery in Waterloo, Indiana. It was built in 1916, and is a one-story, rectangular limestone structure with simple Classical Revival-style detail and Gothic buttresses. It measures 44 feet in width and 32 feet in depth. The mausoleum was used for interments until the 1960s.

This was the second community mausoleum built in DeKalb County, constructed a few years after a national movement to construct community mausolea began in neighboring Ohio in the early 20th century. Many members of Waterloo's prominent farming families (including the Links, the Bowmans, and the Hammans) are interred here.

It was added to the National Register of Historic Places in 2014.
