= Moore, Indiana =

Moore
- Unincorporated community
- Location within Indiana Location within the United States
- Coordinates: 41°23′49″N 84°57′09″W
- Country: United States
- State: Indiana
- County: DeKalb
- Township: Wilmington
- Elevation: 879 ft (268 m)
- ZIP code: 46721
- FIPS code: 18-50886
- GNIS feature ID: 439389

Moore, Indiana is an unincorporated community in Wilmington Township, DeKalb County, Indiana, United States, in the northeastern corner of the state.

An early variant name was Moore's Station. Moore contained a post office from 1875 until 1909, and the post office was called Moore's Station in its early years.

== Geography ==
Moore is located at 41°23′49″N 84°57′09″W.

The community is northeast of Auburn and south of U.S. Route 6 (Grand Army of the Republic Highway).
