= Summit, DeKalb County, Indiana =

Summit
- Unincorporated community
- Location within Indiana Location within the United States
- Coordinates: 41°30′47″N 85°01′34″W
- Country: United States
- State: Indiana
- County: DeKalb
- Township: Smithfield
- Elevation: 1,001 ft (305 m)
- ZIP code: 46705
- FIPS code: 18-74080
- GNIS feature ID: 444393

Summit is an unincorporated community in Smithfield Township, DeKalb County, Indiana.

== Geography ==
Summit lies 10 miles (16 km) from Auburn, Indiana, the county seat.

== History ==
A post office was established at Summit in 1871, and remained in operation until it was discontinued in 1908. Summit was named for its lofty elevation.

In 1890, the population was 75 residents.

The population was 23 in 1940.

== See also ==
- Fairfield Center, Indiana
