= Saint Johns, Indiana =

Saint Johns
- Unincorporated community
- Location within Indiana Location within the United States
- Coordinates: 41°18′31″N 85°06′49″W
- Country: United States
- State: Indiana
- County: DeKalb
- Township: Butler
- Elevation: 860 ft (260 m)
- ZIP code: 46738
- FIPS code: 18-66906
- GNIS feature ID: 442564

Saint Johns is an unincorporated community in Butler Township, DeKalb County, Indiana.

== History ==
Saint Johns once contained a post office called DeKalb. It operated between 1840 and 1905.

== Geography ==
Saint Johns is located at 41°18′31″N 85°06′49″W.
