= Fairfield Center, Indiana =

Fairfield Center
- Unincorporated community
- Location within Indiana Location within the United States
- Coordinates: 41°28′57″N 85°07′41″W
- Country: United States
- State: Indiana
- County: DeKalb
- Township: Fairfield
- Elevation: 965 ft (294 m)
- ZIP code: 46730
- FIPS code: 18-22360
- GNIS feature ID: 449653

Fairfield Center is an unincorporated community in Fairfield Township, DeKalb County, Indiana.

== History ==
A post office was established at Fairfield Center in 1852, and remained in operation until it was discontinued in 1906. Fairfield Center is at the geographical center of Fairfield Township, hence the name.

== Geography ==
Fairfield Center is located at 41°28′57″N 85°07′41″W.
