= Concord, DeKalb County, Indiana =

Concord
- Unincorporated community
- Location within Indiana Location within the United States
- Coordinates: 41°19′34″N 84°56′43″W
- Country: United States
- State: Indiana
- County: DeKalb
- Township: Concord
- Elevation: 850 ft (260 m)
- ZIP code: 46706
- FIPS code: 18-14815
- GNIS feature ID: 432848

Concord is an unincorporated community in Concord Township, DeKalb County, Indiana.

== History ==
A post office was established at Concord in 1876, and remained in operation until it was discontinued in 1929. The community took its name from Concord Township.

== Geography ==
Concord is located at 41°19′34″N 84°56′43″W.
