= Butler Community Mausoleum =

Historic site in DeKalb County, Indiana

- U.S. National Register of Historic Places
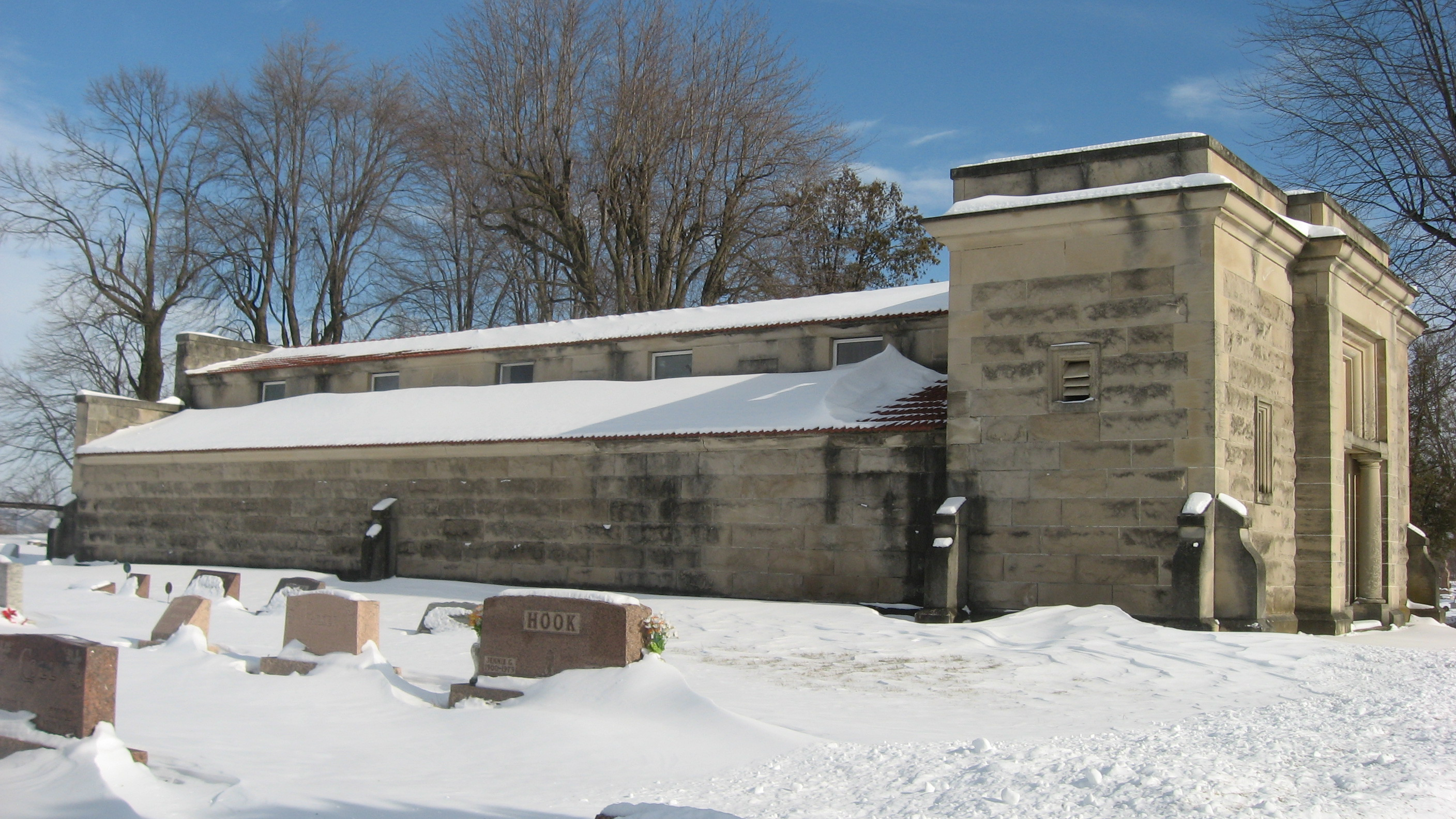
- Butler Community Mausoleum, January 2014

- Location within Indiana Location within the United States
- Location: County Road 28 E., east of Butler, Stafford Township, DeKalb County, Indiana
- Coordinates: 41°25′49″N 84°50′59″W
- Area: less than 1 acre (0.40 ha)
- Built: 1914
- Architect: Ohio Mausoleum Company
- Architectural style: Classical Revival
- MPS: The Early Community Mausoleum Movement in Indiana
- NRHP reference No.: 14000070
- Added to NRHP: March 24, 2014

Butler Community Mausoleum is a historic mausoleum located in Butler Cemetery near Butler in Stafford Township, DeKalb County, Indiana. It was built in 1914, and is a one-story, limestone structure with a red tile roof and simple Classical Revival style detail. It measures 36 feet wide and 78 feet deep and consists of a tall vestibule section and long nave-like wing with clerestory. At the entrance are flanking Doric order columns. The mausoleum was used for interments into the 1960s.

It was added to the National Register of Historic Places in 2014.
