= Spencerville, Indiana =

Spencerville
- Unincorporated community and Census-designated place
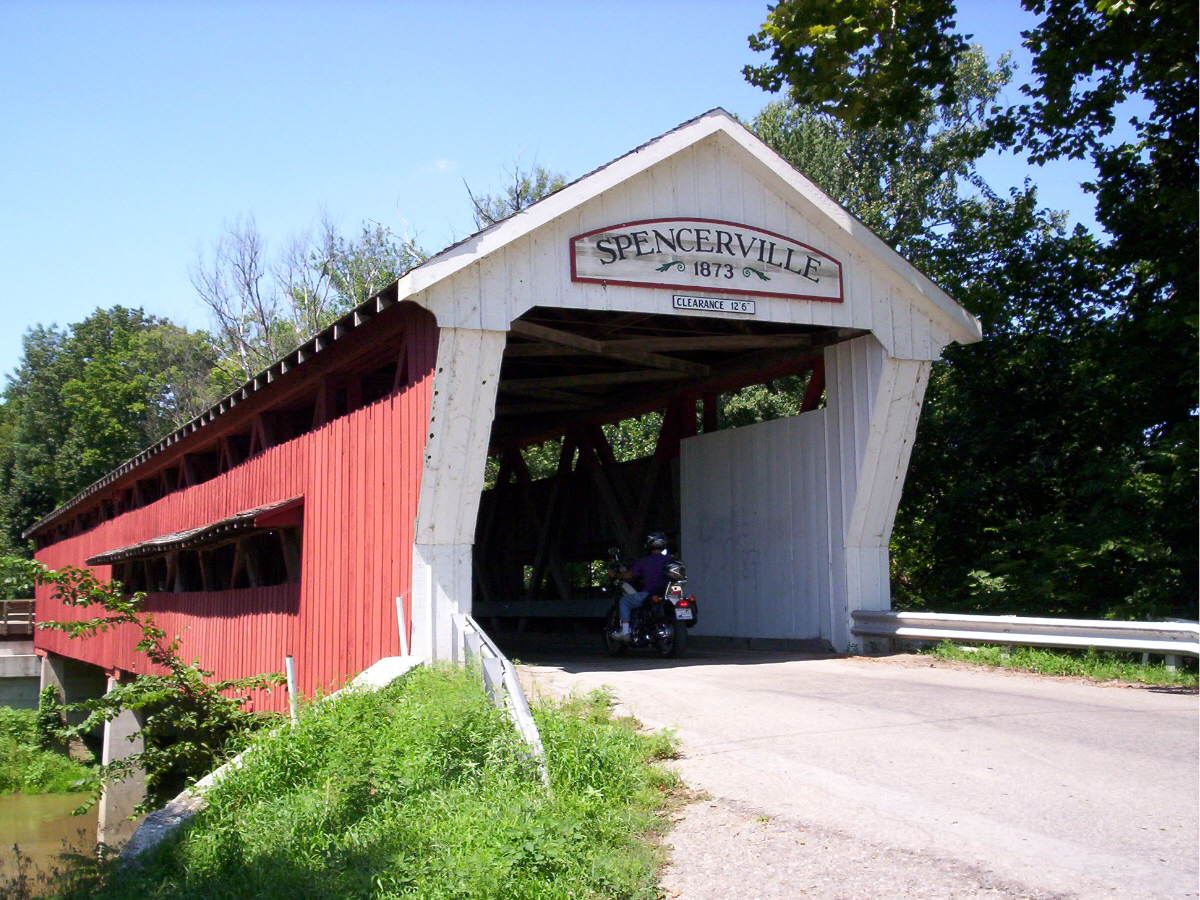
- West portal of the Spencerville Covered Bridge

- Location within Indiana Location within the United States
- Coordinates: 41°16′58″N 84°55′25″W
- Country: United States
- State: Indiana
- County: DeKalb
- Township: Spencer
- Elevation: 794 ft (242 m)
- ZIP code: 46788
- FIPS code: 18-71990
- GNIS feature ID: 2830356

Spencerville is an unincorporated community located in Spencer Township, DeKalb County, Indiana, United States. Spencerville is home to the county's only covered bridge.

== History ==
The Spencerville post office was established in 1839. Spencerville was named after John Spencer, who was a relative of one of the city's founders.

== Demographics ==
Historical population
Census	Pop.	Note	%±
2023 (est.)	322

The United States Census Bureau defined Spencerville as a census designated place in the 2022 American Community Survey.
