= Waterloo, Indiana =

- Town
- Logo

- Location of Waterloo in DeKalb County, Indiana.
- Coordinates: 41°25′50″N 85°01′24″W
- Country: United States
- State: Indiana
- County: DeKalb
- Township: Grant, Smithfield

Area
  - Total: 2.11 sq mi (5.47 km^{2})
  - Land: 2.11 sq mi (5.47 km^{2})
  - Water: 0 sq mi (0.00 km^{2})
- Elevation: 915 ft (279 m)

Population (2020)
  - Total: 2,116
  - Density: 1,002.7/sq mi (387.16/km^{2})
- Time zone: UTC-5 (Eastern (EST))
  - Summer (DST): UTC-4 (EDT)
- ZIP code: 46793
- Area code: 260
- FIPS code: 18-81278
- GNIS feature ID: 2397725
- Website: waterlooin.gov

Waterloo is a town in Grant and Smithfield townships, DeKalb County, Indiana, United States. The population was 2,116 at the 2020 census.

== History ==
Waterloo was laid out in 1856 when the railroad was extended to that point. It was likely named after Waterloo, in Belgium.

The Waterloo Community Mausoleum was added to the National Register of Historic Places in 2014.

== Geography ==
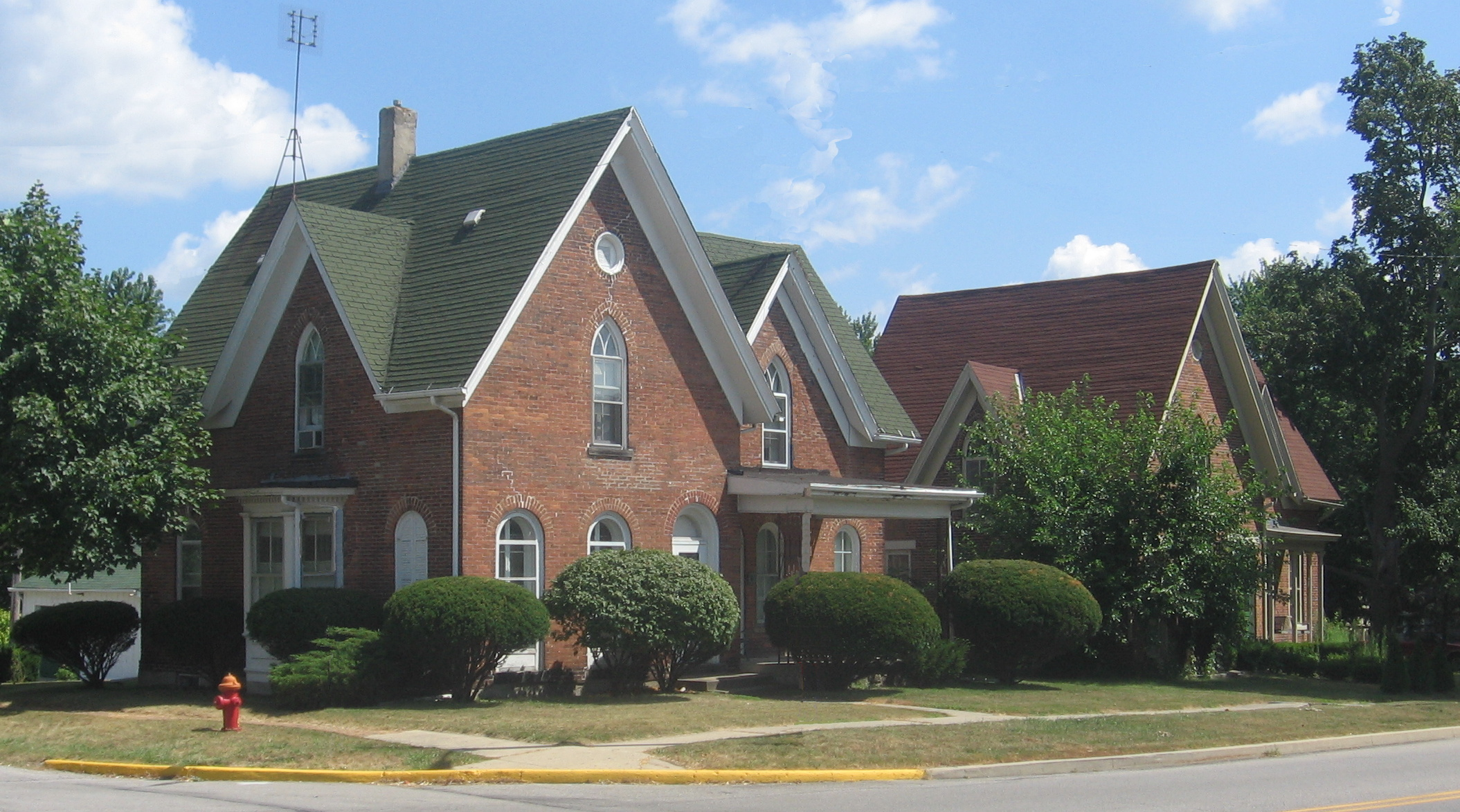
Historic houses in Waterloo

According to the 2010 census, Waterloo has a total area of 1.74 square miles (4.51 km^{2}), all land.

A nearly complete mastodon skeleton discovered near Waterloo in 1888 is displayed at the Carnegie Museum of Natural History in Pittsburgh.

== Demographics ==
Historical population
Census	Pop.	Note	%±
1860	343		—
1870	1,259		267.1%
1880	1,376		9.3%
1890	1,478		7.4%
1900	1,244		−15.8%
1910	1,167		−6.2%
1920	1,172		0.4%
1930	1,244		6.1%
1940	1,257		1.0%
1950	1,414		12.5%
1960	1,432		1.3%
1970	1,876		31.0%
1980	1,951		4.0%
1990	2,040		4.6%
2000	2,200		7.8%
2010	2,242		1.9%
2020	2,116		−5.6%
U.S. Decennial Census

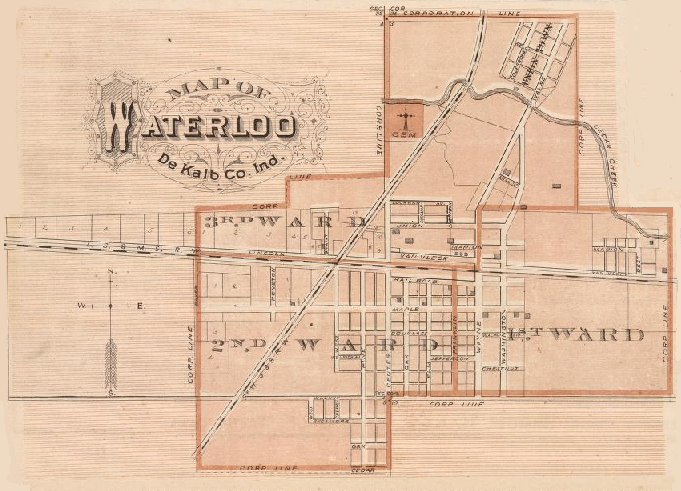
Waterloo, Indiana from 1876 Illustrated Historical Atlas of the State of Indiana, Baskin, Forster, Co., Chicago.

=== 2020 census ===
As of the 2020 census, Waterloo had a population of 2,116. The median age was 35.2 years. 26.5% of residents were under the age of 18 and 11.7% of residents were 65 years of age or older. For every 100 females there were 99.6 males, and for every 100 females age 18 and over there were 97.8 males age 18 and over.

0.0% of residents lived in urban areas, while 100.0% lived in rural areas.

There were 793 households in Waterloo, of which 35.4% had children under the age of 18 living in them. Of all households, 45.1% were married-couple households, 20.2% were households with a male householder and no spouse or partner present, and 23.7% were households with a female householder and no spouse or partner present. About 24.9% of all households were made up of individuals and 8.4% had someone living alone who was 65 years of age or older.

There were 911 housing units, of which 13.0% were vacant. The homeowner vacancy rate was 1.5% and the rental vacancy rate was 23.4%.

Racial composition as of the 2020 census
Race	Number	Percent
White	1,973	93.2%
Black or African American	6	0.3%
American Indian and Alaska Native	8	0.4%
Asian	3	0.1%
Native Hawaiian and Other Pacific Islander	2	0.1%
Some other race	28	1.3%
Two or more races	96	4.5%
Hispanic or Latino (of any race)	59	2.8%

=== 2010 census ===
As of the census of 2010, there were 2,242 people, 809 households, and 577 families living in the town. The population density was 1,288.5 inhabitants per square mile (497.5/km^{2}). There were 942 housing units at an average density of 541.4 per square mile (209.0/km^{2}). The racial makeup of the town was 95.3% White, 0.5% African American, 0.1% Native American, 1.7% from other races, and 2.4% from two or more races. Hispanic or Latino of any race were 3.8% of the population.

There were 809 households, of which 42.5% had children under the age of 18 living with them, 48.1% were married couples living together, 16.8% had a female householder with no husband present, 6.4% had a male householder with no wife present, and 28.7% were non-families. 23.4% of all households were made up of individuals, and 7.5% had someone living alone who was 65 years of age or older. The average household size was 2.77 and the average family size was 3.19.

The median age in the town was 31.5 years. 30% of residents were under the age of 18; 10.1% were between the ages of 18 and 24; 29.1% were from 25 to 44; 22.9% were from 45 to 64; and 8% were 65 years of age or older. The gender makeup of the town was 50.6% male and 49.4% female.

=== 2000 census ===
As of the census of 2000, there were 2,200 people, 832 households, and 584 families living in the town. The population density was 1,466.6 inhabitants per square mile (566.3/km^{2}). There were 898 housing units at an average density of 598.7 per square mile (231.2/km^{2}). The racial makeup of the town was 95.50% White, 0.23% African American, 0.45% Native American, 0.18% Asian, 2.82% from other races, and 0.82% from two or more races. Hispanic or Latino of any race were 3.68% of the population.

There were 832 households, out of which 39.1% had children under the age of 18 living with them, 52.3% were married couples living together, 11.8% had a female householder with no husband present, and 29.7% were non-families. 23.8% of all households were made up of individuals, and 8.4% had someone living alone who was 65 years of age or older. The average household size was 2.64 and the average family size was 3.10.

In the town, the population was spread out, with 30.4% under the age of 18, 9.5% from 18 to 24, 33.0% from 25 to 44, 18.8% from 45 to 64, and 8.4% who were 65 years of age or older. The median age was 31 years. For every 100 females, there were 106.4 males. For every 100 females age 18 and over, there were 100.8 males.

The median income for a household in the town was $39,831, and the median income for a family was $45,625. Males had a median income of $35,035 versus $24,635 for females. The per capita income for the town was $16,248. About 7.9% of families and 12.4% of the population were below the poverty line, including 16.8% of those under age 18 and 17.8% of those age 65 or over.

== Education ==
Waterloo lies in the Dekalb County Central United School District. Public schools serving Waterloo are:

- Waterloo Elementary School
- DeKalb Middle School
- DeKalb High School

The town is served by the Waterloo-Grant Township Public Library, one of four public libraries in Dekalb County. It is a Carnegie library that opened in 1913.

== Rail transportation ==
Waterloo is located on the old Lake Shore and Michigan Southern Railway, and is now on the Norfolk Southern Railway. The town is now served daily by two Amtrak trains: the Capitol Limited and the Lake Shore Limited.

In October 2010, the Town of Waterloo received a $1.8 million grant from the federal government to build a longer platform just east of the current station, bringing it up to ADA standards, and add a canopy, lighting, and interactive signage. Ultimately, the platform was not built, but the grant was used to install the lighting and electronic signage, as well as a parking lot, in 2016. The previous rail depot, which was restored in 2010, was moved closer to the existing platform and reopened to Amtrak passengers.

== Media ==
WINT-TV, Channel 15, which became WANE-TV, Fort Wayne, in 1956, began broadcasting from studios in Waterloo in 1954.
