= Richland Township, DeKalb County, Indiana =

Richland Township
- Township
- Location of Richland Township in DeKalb County
- Coordinates: 41°24′43″N 85°08′31″W
- Country: United States
- State: Indiana
- County: DeKalb

Government
  - Type: Indiana township

Area
  - Total: 23.58 sq mi (61.1 km^{2})
  - Land: 23.5 sq mi (61 km^{2})
  - Water: 0.08 sq mi (0.21 km^{2})
- Elevation: 915 ft (279 m)

Population (2020)
  - Total: 1,235
  - Density: 56.7/sq mi (21.9/km^{2})
- FIPS code: 18-64008
- GNIS feature ID: 453790

Richland Township is one of fifteen townships in DeKalb County, Indiana. As of the 2020 census, its population was 1,235, down from 1,333 at 2010, and it contained 510 housing units.

== History ==
Richland Township was organized in 1837.

== Geography ==
According to the 2010 census, the township has a total area of 23.58 square miles (61.1 km^{2}), of which 23.5 square miles (61 km^{2}) (or 99.66%) is land and 0.08 square miles (0.21 km^{2}) (or 0.34%) is water. Burdick Lake, Depew Lake, Haynes Lake and Lintz Lake are in this township.

=== Cities and towns ===
- Corunna

=== Unincorporated towns ===
- Sedan

=== Adjacent townships ===
- Fairfield Township (north)
- Smithfield Township (northeast)
- Grant Township (east)
- Union Township (east)
- Keyser Township (south)
- Allen Township, Noble County (west)
- Wayne Township, Noble County (northwest)

=== Major highways ===
- U.S. Route 6
- Indiana State Road 327

=== Cemeteries ===
The township contains two cemeteries: Corunna and Sedan.
