= Jackson Township, DeKalb County, Indiana =

Jackson Township
- Township
- Location of Jackson Township in DeKalb County
- Coordinates: 41°18′30″N 85°10′00″W
- Country: United States
- State: Indiana
- County: DeKalb

Government
  - Type: Indiana township

Area
  - Total: 35.59 sq mi (92.2 km^{2})
  - Land: 35.4 sq mi (92 km^{2})
  - Water: 0.19 sq mi (0.49 km^{2})
- Elevation: 850 ft (259 m)

Population (2020)
  - Total: 3,664
  - Density: 86.5/sq mi (33.4/km^{2})
- FIPS code: 18-36936
- GNIS feature ID: 453440
- Website: jacksontownshipdekalb.com

Jackson Township is one of fifteen townships in DeKalb County, Indiana. As of the 2020 census, its population was 3,664, up from 3,064 at the 2010 census, and it contained 1,448 housing units.

== History ==
Jackson Township was founded in 1838.

== Geography ==
According to the 2010 census, the township has a total area of 35.59 square miles (92.2 km^{2}), of which 35.4 square miles (92 km^{2}) (or 99.47%) is land and 0.19 square miles (0.49 km^{2}) (or 0.53%) is water. Dunton Lake is in this township.

=== Cities and towns ===
- Auburn (south edge)

=== Unincorporated towns ===
- Auburn Junction
- Hopewell

=== Adjacent townships ===
- Union Township (north)
- Wilmington Township (northeast)
- Concord Township (east)
- Spencer Township (east)
- Springfield Township, Allen County (southeast)
- Cedar Creek Township, Allen County (south)
- Perry Township, Allen County (southwest)
- Butler Township (west)
- Keyser Township (west)

=== Cemeteries ===
The township contains two cemeteries: Bear Creek and Watson.
