= DeKalb County, Indiana =

County in Indiana, United States

- County
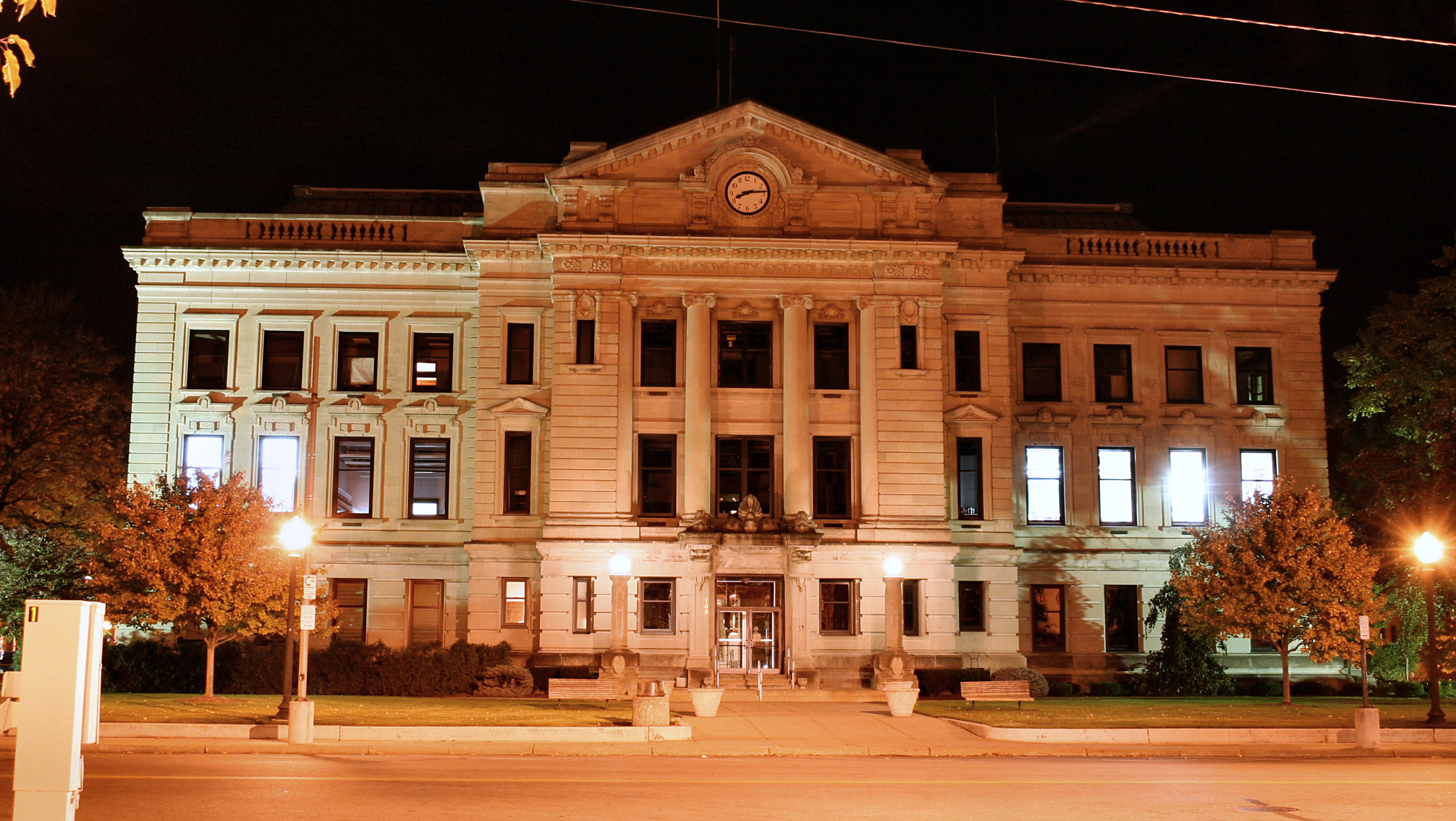
- The DeKalb County Courthouse in Auburn, Indiana

- Location within the U.S. state of Indiana
- Coordinates: 41°22′01″N 85°03′32″W
- Country: United States
- State: Indiana
- Founded: February 7, 1835 (authorized); 1837 (organized)
- Named for: Johann, Baron de Kalb
- Seat: Auburn
- Largest city: Auburn

Area
  - Total: 363.85 sq mi (942.4 km^{2})
  - Land: 362.82 sq mi (939.7 km^{2})
  - Water: 1.03 sq mi (2.7 km^{2}) 0.28%

Population (2020)
  - Total: 43,265
  - Estimate (2025): 44,535 ▲
  - Density: 119.25/sq mi (46.041/km^{2})
- Time zone: UTC−5 (Eastern)
  - Summer (DST): UTC−4 (EDT)
- Congressional district: 3rd
- Website: DeKalb County Government
- Indiana county number 17

DeKalb County is a county in the U.S. state of Indiana. As of the 2020 United States Census, the population was 43,265. The county seat is Auburn.

== History ==
On February 7, 1835, the Indiana State Legislature passed an omnibus bill that authorized the creation of thirteen counties in northeast Indiana on previously unorganized land (including the recent Wabash New Purchase). The organization of the county's government commenced in 1837. It was named for General Johann de Kalb, a Continental Army officer from Bavaria, who was killed at the Battle of Camden in South Carolina. The first settlers in the future DeKalb County were from New England, settling what was then known as the Northwest Territory. These people were "Yankee" migrants, descended from the English Puritans who settled New England in the colonial era. In the 1870s immigrants from Ireland and Germany began arriving in DeKalb County, in large numbers.

== Geography ==
DeKalb County lies on the east side of Indiana; its east border abuts the western border of Ohio. Its low, rolling terrain is entirely devoted to agriculture or urban development. Its highest point (1,060 feet/320 meters ASL) is a small rise in the NW portion of the county, 2 miles (3.2 km) west of Fairfield Center. The Saint Joseph River flows southwestward through the SE portion of the county, while the western part of the county is drained by Cedar Creek.

According to the 2010 census, the county has a total area of 363.85 square miles (942.4 km^{2}), of which 362.82 square miles (939.7 km^{2}) (or 99.72%) is land and 1.03 square miles (2.7 km^{2}) (or 0.28%) is water.

=== Adjacent counties ===
- LaGrange County - northwest
- Steuben County - north
- Williams County, Ohio - northeast
- Defiance County, Ohio - southeast
- Allen County - south
- Noble County - west

=== Cities and towns ===
- Altona
- Ashley
- Auburn (county seat)
- Butler
- Corunna
- Garrett
- Hamilton
- Saint Joe
- Waterloo

=== Unincorporated communities ===
- Auburn Junction
- Butler Center
- Cedar
- Concord
- Fairfield Center
- Hopewell
- Moore
- Newville
- Orangeville
- Saint Johns
- Sedan
- Spencerville
- Summit

=== Townships ===
- Butler
- Concord
- Fairfield
- Franklin
- Grant
- Jackson
- Keyser
- Newville
- Richland
- Smithfield
- Spencer
- Stafford
- Troy
- Union
- Wilmington

=== Major highways ===
- Interstate 69
- U.S. Route 6
- State Road 1
- State Road 3
- State Road 4
- State Road 8
- State Road 101
- State Road 205
- State Road 327
- State Road 427

== Climate and weather ==
Auburn, Indiana

Climate chart (precipitation, max. and min. temperature)
J	F	M	A	M	J	J	A	S	O	N	D
1.8 31 17	1.4 36 20	2.6 48 29	3.4 61 39	3.7 72 49	4.2 81 58	3.7 84 62	2.8 82 60	3.6 75 54	2.7 63 43	3.2 49 34	2.5 37 23
- █ Average max. and min. temperatures in °F
- █ Precipitation totals in inches
- Source: The Weather Channel
Metric conversion
J	F	M	A	M	J	J	A	S	O	N	D
46 −1 −8	36 2 −7	65 9 −2	85 16 4	94 22 9	106 27 14	94 29 17	72 28 16	92 24 12	67 17 6	80 9 1	64 3 −5
- █ Average max. and min. temperatures in °C
- █ Precipitation totals in mm

In recent years, average temperatures in Auburn have ranged from a low of 17 °F (−8 °C) in January to a high of 84 °F (29 °C) in July, although a record low of −24 °F (−31 °C) was recorded in January 1984 and a record high of 106 °F (41 °C) was recorded in June 1988. Average monthly precipitation ranged from 1.42 inches (36 mm) in February to 4.17 inches (106 mm) in June.

== Government ==
The county government is a constitutional body, granted specific powers by the Constitution of Indiana and the Indiana Code.

County Council: The fiscal branch of the county government; controls spending and revenue collection in the county. Representatives are elected to four-year terms from county districts. They are responsible for setting salaries, the annual budget, and special spending. The council also has limited authority to impose local taxes, in the form of an income and property tax that is subject to state level approval, excise taxes, and service taxes.

Board of Commissioners: A three-member board of commissioners combines executive and non-fiscal legislative powers. Commissioners are elected county-wide, in staggered four-year terms. One commissioner serves as president. The commissioners also function as the county drainage board, exercising control over the construction and maintenance of legal drains.

Courts: DeKalb County has a Circuit Court (75th Judicial Circuit) and two Superior Courts. By local rule, approved by the Indiana Supreme Court, the jurisdiction of the Circuit Court is currently limited to juvenile and domestic cases. Criminal, civil and domestic cases are heard in the two superior courts. Judges of each court are elected for six-year terms on partisan tickets.

County Officials: The county has other elected offices, including sheriff, coroner, auditor, treasurer, recorder, surveyor, and circuit court clerk. Each officer is elected to a four-year term of four years and oversees a different part of county government. Members elected to county government positions are required to declare a party affiliation and to be residents of the county.

DeKalb County is part of Indiana's 3rd congressional district and in 2008 was represented by Mark Souder in the United States Congress. It is in Indiana Senate districts 13 and 14, and Indiana House of Representatives districts 51, 52 and 85.

United States presidential election results for DeKalb County, Indiana
Year	Republican		Democratic		Third party(ies)	
Year	No.	%	No.	%	No.	%
1888	2,879	46.28%	3,160	50.80%	182	2.93%
1892	2,499	40.02%	2,801	44.86%	944	15.12%
1896	3,137	45.56%	3,678	53.41%	71	1.03%
1900	3,218	46.11%	3,488	49.98%	273	3.91%
1904	3,416	49.97%	2,827	41.35%	593	8.67%
1908	2,991	42.41%	3,684	52.24%	377	5.35%
1912	1,125	18.11%	2,766	44.53%	2,320	37.35%
1916	2,898	43.53%	3,372	50.65%	387	5.81%
1920	6,514	56.35%	4,750	41.09%	296	2.56%
1924	6,093	54.63%	4,133	37.05%	928	8.32%
1928	7,373	64.04%	4,077	35.41%	64	0.56%
1932	5,590	43.06%	7,235	55.74%	156	1.20%
1936	5,848	44.89%	6,970	53.50%	209	1.60%
1940	7,676	57.17%	5,690	42.38%	60	0.45%
1944	7,479	60.38%	4,810	38.83%	98	0.79%
1948	6,941	54.86%	5,439	42.99%	272	2.15%
1952	8,713	64.66%	4,347	32.26%	416	3.09%
1956	9,061	66.75%	4,435	32.67%	79	0.58%
1960	8,957	62.66%	5,277	36.92%	61	0.43%
1964	6,210	44.71%	7,559	54.42%	120	0.86%
1968	7,650	56.93%	4,790	35.65%	998	7.43%
1972	8,834	66.44%	4,354	32.74%	109	0.82%
1976	7,860	55.17%	6,151	43.18%	235	1.65%
1980	7,886	56.53%	4,911	35.20%	1,153	8.27%
1984	8,769	64.82%	4,617	34.13%	142	1.05%
1988	9,018	65.75%	4,657	33.95%	41	0.30%
1992	6,682	44.48%	4,652	30.97%	3,688	24.55%
1996	6,851	51.36%	4,840	36.28%	1,648	12.35%
2000	8,701	63.12%	4,776	34.65%	308	2.23%
2004	10,468	67.96%	4,810	31.23%	125	0.81%
2008	9,780	56.95%	7,175	41.78%	219	1.28%
2012	10,587	64.71%	5,419	33.12%	354	2.16%
2016	12,054	70.92%	3,942	23.19%	1,000	5.88%
2020	14,237	72.43%	4,966	25.26%	453	2.30%
2024	14,377	72.50%	5,064	25.54%	390	1.97%

== Demographics ==
Historical population
Census	Pop.	Note	%±
1840	1,968		—
1850	8,251		319.3%
1860	13,880		68.2%
1870	17,167		23.7%
1880	20,225		17.8%
1890	24,307		20.2%
1900	25,711		5.8%
1910	25,054		−2.6%
1920	25,600		2.2%
1930	24,911		−2.7%
1940	24,756		−0.6%
1950	26,023		5.1%
1960	28,271		8.6%
1970	30,837		9.1%
1980	33,606		9.0%
1990	35,324		5.1%
2000	40,285		14.0%
2010	42,223		4.8%
2020	43,265		2.5%
2025 (est.)	44,535	▲	2.9%
US Decennial Census; 1790-1960 1900-1990; 1990-2000 2010-2014

=== Racial and ethnic composition ===
DeKalb County, Indiana – Racial and ethnic composition Note: the US Census treats Hispanic/Latino as an ethnic category. This table excludes Latinos from the racial categories and assigns them to a separate category. Hispanics/Latinos may be of any race.
Race / Ethnicity (NH = Non-Hispanic)	Pop 1980	Pop 1990	Pop 2000	Pop 2010	Pop 2020	% 1980	% 1990	% 2000	% 2010	% 2020
White alone (NH)	33,171	34,792	39,009	40,406	40,232	98.71%	98.49%	96.83%	95.70%	92.99%
Black or African American alone (NH)	28	37	101	141	183	0.08%	0.10%	0.25%	0.33%	0.42%
Native American or Alaska Native alone (NH)	64	90	73	84	67	0.19%	0.25%	0.18%	0.20%	0.15%
Asian alone (NH)	48	75	130	186	225	0.14%	0.21%	0.32%	0.44%	0.52%
Native Hawaiian or Pacific Islander alone (NH)	x	x	19	17	39	x	x	0.05%	0.04%	0.09%
Other race alone (NH)	9	9	23	19	79	0.03%	0.03%	0.06%	0.04%	0.18%
Mixed race or Multiracial (NH)	x	x	254	339	1,255	x	x	0.63%	0.80%	2.90%
Hispanic or Latino (any race)	286	321	676	1,031	1,185	0.85%	0.91%	1.68%	2.44%	2.74%
Total	33,606	35,324	40,285	42,223	43,265	100.00%	100.00%	100.00%	100.00%	100.00%

=== 2020 census ===
As of the 2020 census, the county had a population of 43,265. The median age was 39.8 years. 24.4% of residents were under the age of 18 and 17.1% of residents were 65 years of age or older. For every 100 females there were 98.6 males, and for every 100 females age 18 and over there were 97.1 males age 18 and over.

The racial makeup of the county was 94.0% White, 0.4% Black or African American, 0.2% American Indian and Alaska Native, 0.5% Asian, 0.1% Native Hawaiian and Pacific Islander, 0.8% from some other race, and 3.9% from two or more races. Hispanic or Latino residents of any race comprised 2.7% of the population.

47.0% of residents lived in urban areas, while 53.0% lived in rural areas.

There were 16,868 households in the county, of which 31.2% had children under the age of 18 living in them. Of all households, 52.0% were married-couple households, 17.5% were households with a male householder and no spouse or partner present, and 22.2% were households with a female householder and no spouse or partner present. About 25.8% of all households were made up of individuals and 11.1% had someone living alone who was 65 years of age or older.

There were 18,096 housing units, of which 6.8% were vacant. Among occupied housing units, 78.8% were owner-occupied and 21.2% were renter-occupied. The homeowner vacancy rate was 1.4% and the rental vacancy rate was 9.3%.

=== 2010 census ===
As of the 2010 United States census, there were 42,223 people, 15,951 households, and 11,328 families in the county. The population density was 116.4 inhabitants per square mile (44.9/km^{2}). There were 17,558 housing units at an average density of 48.4 per square mile (18.7/km^{2}). The racial makeup of the county was 96.9% white, 0.5% Asian, 0.4% black or African American, 0.2% American Indian, 0.8% from other races, and 1.2% from two or more races. Those of Hispanic or Latino origin made up 2.4% of the population. In terms of ancestry, 36.3% were German, 10.9% were American, 10.8% were Irish, and 9.1% were English.

Of the 15,951 households, 35.2% had children under the age of 18 living with them, 54.8% were married couples living together, 10.5% had a female householder with no husband present, 29.0% were non-families, and 24.3% of all households were made up of individuals. The average household size was 2.61 and the average family size was 3.08. The median age was 38.1 years.

The median income for a household in the county was $47,697 and the median income for a family was $55,280. Males had a median income of $44,880 versus $30,663 for females. The per capita income for the county was $21,779. About 6.7% of families and 9.0% of the population were below the poverty line, including 11.3% of those under age 18 and 6.2% of those age 65 or over.

== Education ==
=== School districts ===
- DeKalb County Central United School District
- DeKalb County Eastern Community School District
- Garrett-Keyser-Butler Community School District
- Hamilton Community Schools

=== Private schools ===
- Lakewood Park Christian School
- St. Joseph's Catholic School (Garrett)
- Trinity Lutheran Church Preschool
- Zion Lutheran Pre-School (Garrett)

== See also ==
- National Register of Historic Places listings in DeKalb County, Indiana
- The Star, daily newspaper covering DeKalb County
