= Smithfield Township, DeKalb County, Indiana =

Smithfield Township
- Township
- Location of Smithfield Township in DeKalb County
- Coordinates: 41°29′01″N 85°01′30″W
- Country: United States
- State: Indiana
- County: DeKalb

Government
  - Type: Indiana township

Area
  - Total: 35.09 sq mi (90.9 km^{2})
  - Land: 34.99 sq mi (90.6 km^{2})
  - Water: 0.1 sq mi (0.26 km^{2})
- Elevation: 935 ft (285 m)

Population (2020)
  - Total: 1,662
  - Density: 46.1/sq mi (17.8/km^{2})
- FIPS code: 18-70200
- GNIS feature ID: 453854

Smithfield Township is one of fifteen townships in DeKalb County, Indiana. As of the 2020 census, its population was 1,662, up from 1,613 at the 2010 census. It contained 718 housing units.

== History ==
Smithfield Township was named for Isaac B. Smith, a pioneer settler.

== Geography ==
According to the 2010 census, the township has a total area of 35.09 square miles (90.9 km^{2}), of which 34.99 square miles (90.6 km^{2}) (or 99.72%) is land and 0.1 square miles (0.26 km^{2}) (or 0.28%) is water. Cedar Lake is in this township.

=== Cities and towns ===
- Ashley (southeast three-quarters)
- Waterloo (north edge)

=== Unincorporated towns ===
- Summit

=== Adjacent townships ===
- Steuben Township, Steuben County (north)
- Otsego Township, Steuben County (northeast)
- Franklin Township (east)
- Wilmington Township (southeast)
- Grant Township (south)
- Richland Township (southwest)
- Fairfield Township (west)
- Salem Township, Steuben County (northwest)

=== Major highways ===
- Interstate 69
- U.S. Route 6
- State Road 4
- State Road 427

=== Cemeteries ===
The township contains two cemeteries: Barkers Chapel and Cedar Lake.
