= Butler Township, DeKalb County, Indiana =

Butler Township
- Township
- Location of Butler Township in DeKalb County
- Coordinates: 41°17′35″N 85°08′16″W
- Country: United States
- State: Indiana
- County: DeKalb

Government
  - Type: Indiana township

Area
  - Total: 23.75 sq mi (61.5 km^{2})
  - Land: 23.69 sq mi (61.4 km^{2})
  - Water: 0.06 sq mi (0.16 km^{2})
- Elevation: 850 ft (260 m)

Population (2020)
  - Total: 1,733
  - Density: 71.4/sq mi (27.6/km^{2})
- FIPS code: 18-09550
- GNIS feature ID: 453148

Butler Township is one of fifteen townships in DeKalb County, Indiana. As of the 2020 census, its population was 1,733, up from 1,691 at 2010, and it contained 704 housing units.

== History ==
Butler Township was founded in 1837.

The William Cornell Homestead was added to the National Register of Historic Places in 1973.

== Geography ==
According to the 2010 census, the township has a total area of 23.75 square miles (61.5 km^{2}), of which 23.69 square miles (61.4 km^{2}) (or 99.75%) is land and 0.06 square miles (0.16 km^{2}) (or 0.25%) is water. Holiday Lakes is in this township.

=== Unincorporated towns ===
- Butler Center
- Cedar
- Saint Johns

(This list is based on USGS data and may include former settlements.)

=== Adjacent townships ===
- Keyser Township (north)
- Jackson Township (east)
- Cedar Creek Township, Allen County (southeast)
- Perry Township, Allen County (south)
- Eel River Township, Allen County (southwest)
- Swan Township, Noble County (west)

=== Major highways ===
- Interstate 69
- State Road 3
- State Road 205
- State Road 327
