= Grant Township, DeKalb County, Indiana =

Grant Township
- Township
- Location of Grant Township in DeKalb County
- Coordinates: 41°25′16″N 85°01′12″W
- Country: United States
- State: Indiana
- County: DeKalb

Government
  - Type: Indiana township

Area
  - Total: 17.49 sq mi (45.3 km^{2})
  - Land: 17.47 sq mi (45.2 km^{2})
  - Water: 0.02 sq mi (0.052 km^{2})
- Elevation: 892 ft (272 m)

Population (2020)
  - Total: 3,086
  - Density: 185.8/sq mi (71.7/km^{2})
- FIPS code: 18-28836
- GNIS feature ID: 453335

Grant Township is one of fifteen townships in DeKalb County, Indiana. As of the 2020 census, its population was 3,086, down from 3,245 at the 2010 census, and it contained 1,293 housing units.

== Geography ==
According to the 2010 census, the township has a total area of 17.49 square miles (45.3 km^{2}), of which 17.47 square miles (45.2 km^{2}) (or 99.89%) is land and 0.02 square miles (0.052 km^{2}) (or 0.11%) is water.

=== Cities and towns ===
- Auburn (north edge)
- Waterloo (vast majority)

=== Adjacent townships ===
- Smithfield Township (north)
- Franklin Township (northeast)
- Wilmington Township (east)
- Union Township (south)
- Richland Township (west)
- Fairfield Township (northwest)

=== Major highways ===
- Interstate 69
- U.S. Route 6
- State Road 427

=== Cemeteries ===
The township contains three cemeteries: Lutz, Ridge, and Tamarack.

== Education ==
Grant Township residents are eligible to obtain a library card at the Waterloo-Grant Township Public Library in Waterloo.
