= Union Township, DeKalb County, Indiana =

Union Township
- Township
- Location of Union Township in DeKalb County
- Coordinates: 41°22′24″N 85°01′22″W
- Country: United States
- State: Indiana
- County: DeKalb

Government
  - Type: Indiana township

Area
  - Total: 17.75 sq mi (46.0 km^{2})
  - Land: 17.74 sq mi (45.9 km^{2})
  - Water: 0.01 sq mi (0.026 km^{2})
- Elevation: 879 ft (268 m)

Population (2020)
  - Total: 13,718
  - Density: 745.1/sq mi (287.7/km^{2})
- FIPS code: 18-77228
- GNIS feature ID: 453912

Union Township is one of fifteen townships in DeKalb County, Indiana. As of the 2020 census, its population was 13,718, up from 13,220 at the 2010 census, and it contained 6,104 housing units. Craig Bassett is the current elected Trustee.

== History ==
Union Township was organized in 1837.

== Geography ==
According to the 2010 census, the township has a total area of 17.75 square miles (46.0 km^{2}), of which 17.74 square miles (45.9 km^{2}) (or 99.94%) is land and 0.01 square miles (0.026 km^{2}) (or 0.06%) is water.

=== Cities and towns ===
- Auburn (northeast three-quarters)

=== Adjacent townships ===
- Grant Township (north)
- Concord Township (east)
- Wilmington Township (east)
- Jackson Township (south)
- Keyser Township (west)
- Richland Township (west)

=== Major highways ===
- Interstate 69
- State Road 8
- State Road 427

=== Cemeteries ===
The township contains seven cemeteries: Cosper, Catholic, Evergreen, Mott, Old Auburn, Roselawn and Woodlawn.
