= Fairfield Township, DeKalb County, Indiana =

Fairfield Township
- Township
- Location of Fairfield Township in DeKalb County
- Coordinates: 41°28′44″N 85°07′58″W
- Country: United States
- State: Indiana
- County: DeKalb

Government
  - Type: Indiana township

Area
  - Total: 35.98 sq mi (93.2 km^{2})
  - Land: 35.66 sq mi (92.4 km^{2})
  - Water: 0.31 sq mi (0.80 km^{2})
- Elevation: 958 ft (292 m)

Population (2020)
  - Total: 1,367
  - Density: 38.4/sq mi (14.8/km^{2})
- FIPS code: 18-22288
- GNIS feature ID: 453284

Fairfield Township is one of fifteen townships in DeKalb County, Indiana. As of the 2020 census, its population was 1,367, representing a tiny decline from 1,368 at the 2010 census, and it contained 661 housing units.

== History ==
Fairfield Township was founded in 1844.

The Maria and Franklin Wiltrout Polygonal Barn was added to the National Register of Historic Places in 1993.

== Geography ==
According to the 2010 census, the township has a total area of 35.98 square miles (93.2 km^{2}), of which 35.66 square miles (92.4 km^{2}) (or 99.11%) is land and 0.31 square miles (0.80 km^{2}) (or 0.86%) is water. Indian Lake, Lower Story Lake and Upper Story Lake are in this township.

=== Unincorporated towns ===
- Fairfield Center

=== Adjacent townships ===
- Salem Township, Steuben County (north)
- Steuben Township, Steuben County (northeast)
- Smithfield Township (east)
- Grant Township (southeast)
- Richland Township (south)
- Wayne Township, Noble County (west)
- Milford Township, LaGrange County (northwest)

=== Major highways ===
- U.S. Route 6
- Indiana State Road 4
- Indiana State Road 327
