= Troy Township, Fountain County, Indiana =

Troy Township
- Township
- Location of Troy Township in Fountain County
- Coordinates: 40°09′25″N 87°21′00″W
- Country: United States
- State: Indiana
- County: Fountain

Government
  - Type: Indiana township

Area
  - Total: 44.44 sq mi (115.1 km^{2})
  - Land: 43.86 sq mi (113.6 km^{2})
  - Water: 0.58 sq mi (1.5 km^{2})
- Elevation: 650 ft (198 m)

Population (2020)
  - Total: 3,735
  - Density: 85.16/sq mi (32.88/km^{2})
- FIPS code: 18-76616
- GNIS feature ID: 453902

Troy Township is one of eleven townships in Fountain County, Indiana. As of the 2020 census, its population was 3,735 and it contained 1,674 housing units.

Historical population
Census	Pop.	Note	%±
1890	2,968		—
1900	3,366		13.4%
1910	3,050		−9.4%
1920	2,785		−8.7%
1930	2,817		1.1%
1940	2,876		2.1%
1950	2,927		1.8%
1960	3,449		17.8%
1970	3,458		0.3%
1980	4,019		16.2%
1990	3,840		−4.5%
2000	3,801		−1.0%
2010	3,711		−2.4%
2020	3,735		0.6%
Source: US Decennial Census

== Geography ==
Troy Township lies along the western side of Fountain County; the Wabash River defines the western borders of both. According to the 2010 census, the township has a total area of 44.44 square miles (115.1 km^{2}), of which 43.86 square miles (113.6 km^{2}) (or 98.69%) is land and 0.58 square miles (1.5 km^{2}) (or 1.31%) is water.

Map of Troy Township

Troy Township contains the Fountain County seat of Covington, in the western part of the county near the river. At one time, the unincorporated community of Layton existed in the southeast part of the township along the present route of U.S. Route 136.

Interstate 74 passes through the southern part of the township. U.S. Route 136 lies to the north of I-74 for most of its route; it passes through Covington, but east of Layton, I-74 crosses to its north side.

=== Cemeteries ===
The township contains the four cemeteries of Bend, Mount Hope, Prescott Grove and Sand Hill.
