= Stafford Township, DeKalb County, Indiana =

Stafford Township
- Township
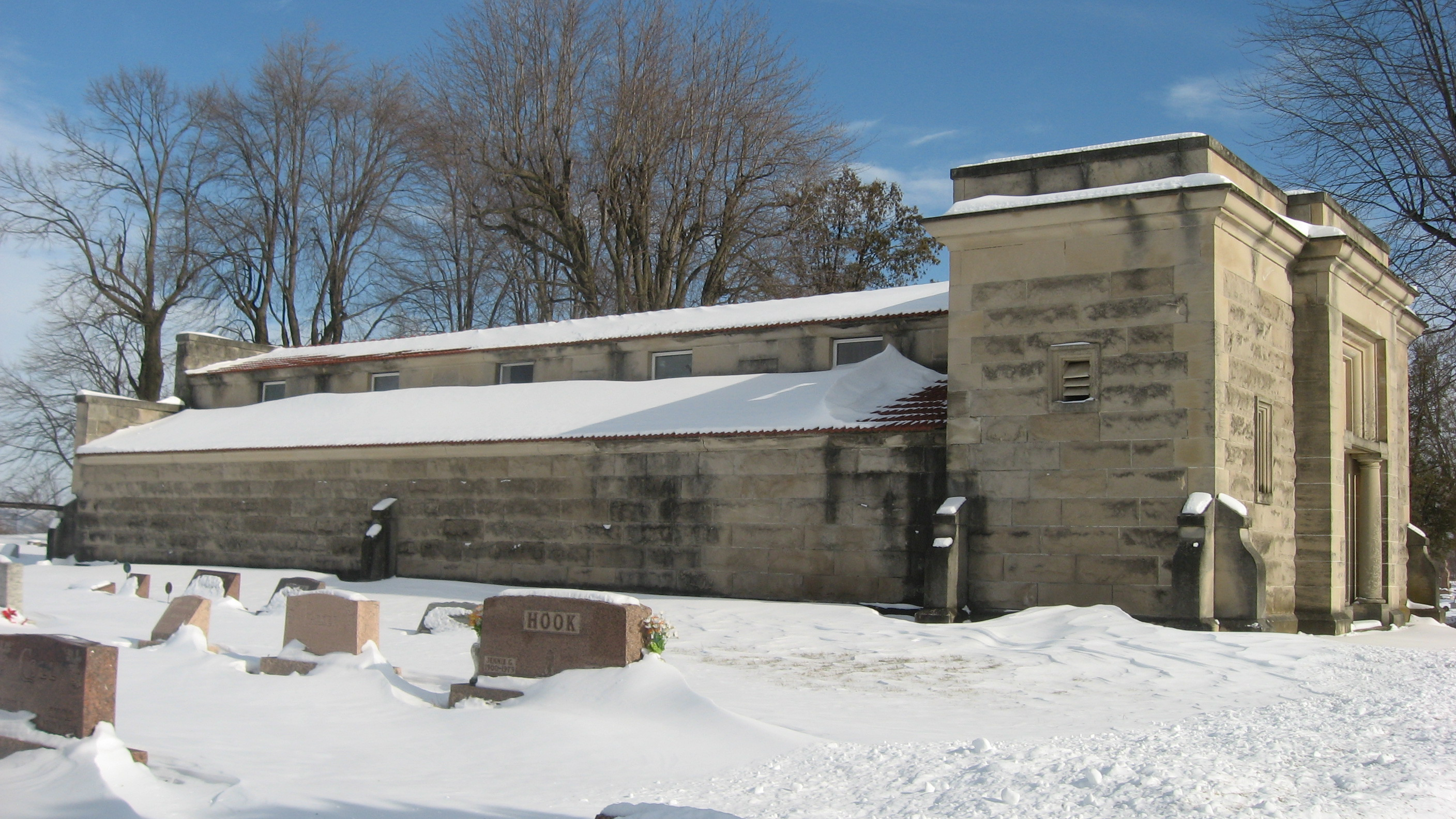
- The Butler Community Mausoleum in the township's northwest

- Location of Stafford Township in DeKalb County
- Coordinates: 41°23′50″N 84°49′19″W
- Country: United States
- State: Indiana
- County: DeKalb

Government
  - Type: Indiana township

Area
  - Total: 14.77 sq mi (38.3 km^{2})
  - Land: 14.77 sq mi (38.3 km^{2})
  - Water: 0 sq mi (0 km^{2})
- Elevation: 840 ft (256 m)

Population (2020)
  - Total: 276
  - Density: 19.2/sq mi (7.4/km^{2})
- FIPS code: 18-72512
- GNIS feature ID: 453868

Stafford Township is one of fifteen townships in DeKalb County, Indiana. As of the 2020 census, its population was 276, down from 283 at the 2010 census, and it contained 121 housing units.

== Geography ==
According to the 2010 census, the township has a total area of 14.77 square miles (38.3 km^{2}), all land.

=== Major highways ===
- U.S. Route 6

=== Cemeteries ===
The township contains one cemetery, Wartenbe.

=== Popular culture ===
The fictional Dr. Richard Kimble from the 1960s television series The Fugitive was from a community called Stafford in Indiana, as was his pursuer Lt. Gerard. The Kimble family lived in Stafford throughout the series.
