= Newville Township, DeKalb County, Indiana =

Newville Township
- Township
- Location of Newville Township in DeKalb County
- Coordinates: 41°18′50″N 84°49′31″W
- Country: United States
- State: Indiana
- County: DeKalb

Government
  - Type: Indiana township

Area
  - Total: 13.79 sq mi (35.7 km^{2})
  - Land: 13.77 sq mi (35.7 km^{2})
  - Water: 0.02 sq mi (0.052 km^{2})
- Elevation: 830 ft (253 m)

Population (2020)
  - Total: 562
  - Density: 40.5/sq mi (15.6/km^{2})
- FIPS code: 18-53784
- GNIS feature ID: 453666

Newville Township is one of fifteen townships in DeKalb County, Indiana. As of the 2010 census, its population was 558 and it contained 196 housing units.

== Geography ==
According to the 2010 census, the township has a total area of 13.79 square miles (35.7 km^{2}), of which 13.77 square miles (35.7 km^{2}) (or 99.85%) is land and 0.02 square miles (0.052 km^{2}) (or 0.15%) is water.

=== Unincorporated towns ===
- Newville
- Newville Center

(This list is based on USGS data and may include former settlements.)

=== Major highways ===
- Indiana State Road 8

=== Cemeteries ===
The township contains two cemeteries: Evergreen and Riverside.
