= Troy Township, DeKalb County, Indiana =

Troy Township
- Township
- Location of Troy Township in DeKalb County
- Coordinates: 41°28′50″N 84°49′51″W
- Country: United States
- State: Indiana
- County: DeKalb

Government
  - Type: Indiana township

Area
  - Total: 14.9 sq mi (39 km^{2})
  - Land: 14.9 sq mi (39 km^{2})
  - Water: 0 sq mi (0 km^{2})
- Elevation: 860 ft (262 m)

Population (2020)
  - Total: 333
  - Density: 20.4/sq mi (7.9/km^{2})
- FIPS code: 18-76598
- GNIS feature ID: 453901

Troy Township is one of fifteen townships in DeKalb County, Indiana. As of the 2020 census, its population was 333, up from 304 at the 2010 census, and it contained 124 housing units.

== Geography ==
According to the 2010 census, the township has a total area of 14.9 square miles (39 km^{2}), all land.

=== Cemeteries ===
The township contains one cemetery, Eddy.
