= Indiana State Road 727 =

Highway in Indiana

State Road 727
- SR 727 highlighted in red

Route information
- Maintained by INDOT
- Length: 0.787 mi (1,267 m)
- Existed: 1934–present

Major junctions
- West end: Pokagon State Park
- East end: SR 127 in Jamestown Township

Location
- Country: United States
- State: Indiana

Highway system
- Indiana State Highway System; Interstate; US; State; Scenic
← SR 662	→ SR 827

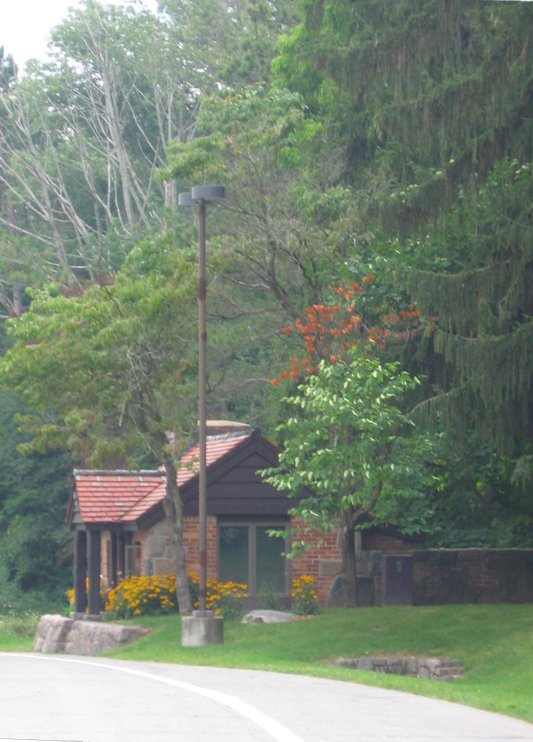
The original guard house at the end of SR 727, at the entrance to Pokagon State Park. This guard house, like many stone structures at Pokagon, was built by the Civilian Conservation Corps.

Indiana State Road 727 (SR 727) is a very short east–west state highway in Indiana, lying entirely within Steuben County. The route is a spur of SR 127 that serves Pokagon State Park. The western terminus of SR 727 is at the main entrance into Pokagon State Park, and its eastern terminus is at SR 127 two miles south of SR 120, immediately northwest of the SR 127 interchange with I-69.

== Route description ==
Starting from the main entrance into Pokagon State Park, SR 727 travels due east through a heavily forested area, which includes the Potawatomi Nature Preserve as well as two crossings of Pokagon's Trail 3. Curving to the southeast, SR 727's journey comes to an abrupt end upon arriving at its junction with SR 127. Less than 0.25-mile (0.40 km) southeast of this intersection, SR 127 meets I-69 at Exit 354.

== History ==
SR 727 was first authorized in 1934 between Ashley and Pleasant Lake, along Steuben county road 400W and 500S. During 1935 the Indiana State Highway Commission wanted to improve SR 727 to hard type of driving surface, so in August 1935 the state accepted a bid for $16,246 equivalent to US$381,504.98 in 2025. The resurfacing was completed during 1936. The designation was extended west of Ashley to SR 327, south of Helmer, in 1940. In 1965 Indiana State Highway Commission truncated SR 727 in Ashley at its intersection with SR 4. The highway commission completed a major rerouting of SR 727 around 1968 when it was moved to its current location.

== Major intersections ==
The entire route is in Jamestown Township, Steuben County.

mi	km	Destinations	Notes
0.000	0.000	Pokagon State Park	Western terminus of SR 727 at state park entrance.
0.787	1.267	SR 127 – Angola, Fremont	Eastern terminus of SR 727
1.000 mi = 1.609 km; 1.000 km = 0.621 mi
