= Interstate 69 in Indiana =

Segment of Interstate Highway in Indiana

Interstate 69
- I-69 highlighted in red, and proposed route highlighted in pink

Route information
- Maintained by INDOT
- Length: 342 mi (550 km)
- Existed: 1956–present
- NHS: Entire route

Major junctions
- South end: US 41 in Evansville
- I-64 near Elberfeld; SR 56 / SR 61 in Petersburg; US 50 / US 150 in Washington; US 231 near Crane; SR 37 / SR 45 / SR 46 / SR 48 in Bloomington; I-65 / I-70 / I-74 / I-465 in Indianapolis; I-469 / US 24 / US 30 / US 33 in Fort Wayne; US 27 / SR 3 in Fort Wayne; I-80 Toll / I-90 Toll / Indiana Toll Road near Angola
- North end: I-69 at the Michigan state line near Fremont

Location
- Country: United States
- State: Indiana
- Counties: Vanderburgh, Warrick, Gibson, Pike, Daviess, Greene, Monroe, Morgan, Johnson, Marion, Hamilton, Madison, Delaware, Grant, Huntington, Wells, Allen, DeKalb, Steuben

Highway system
- Interstate Highway System; Main; Auxiliary; Suffixed; Business; Future; Indiana State Highway System; Interstate; US; State; Scenic
← SR 68	→ SR 69

Interstate 69 (I-69), also known as the Iraq Afghanistan Veterans Memorial Highway south of Indianapolis, in the US state of Indiana travels southwest to northeast, connecting all three of the state's largest cities, Evansville, Indianapolis, and Fort Wayne. The highway proceeds north to the state of Michigan, reaching its capital city, Lansing and beyond, and is planned to eventually proceed south to the state of Kentucky and beyond.

I-69 begins in Southwestern Indiana at the interchange with U.S. Route 41 (US 41) and Veterans Memorial Parkway in Evansville and crosses the state line traveling due northeast into Michigan northwest of the town of Fremont. Between I-64 and Bloomington, four new terrain sections were opened in phases in 2009, 2012, and 2015 as part of the planned national extension of I-69 southwest from Indianapolis via Paducah, Kentucky; Memphis, Tennessee; Shreveport, Louisiana; and Houston, Texas, to the international border with Mexico in Texas. The portion of I-69 between US 41 and I-64 is known as the Robert D. Orr Highway and originally was designated I-164. This newer, southern segment was divided into construction segments SIUs 3 and 4, with SIU 2 being the previously existing segment of I-465 with which I-69 now runs concurrently around Indianapolis. The connection to I-465 on the southern segment was opened in early August 2024, with the southbound connections opening on August 6 and the northbound connections opening on August 9. I-69 will be extended southwards to cross a new bridge over the Ohio River into Kentucky. Construction of the bridge is set to begin in 2027 and take four years to complete.

== Route description ==
I-69 begins at an interchange with US 41 on the southern edge of Evansville. The road continues northwest as Veterans Memorial Parkway, a four-lane divided highway that parallels the Ohio River to Downtown Evansville, where the parkway continues as Riverside Drive. From US 41, I-69 briefly heads east, then gradually curves to the north around the southern and eastern city limits.

Between Evansville and Bloomington, I-69 traverses the largely rural, open areas of Southwestern Indiana. Along the way, I-69 has interchanges with I-64 near the town of Elberfeld, US 50 and US 150 on the eastern side of the city of Washington, and US 231 near the town of Crane. Near the town of Elnora, I-69 transitions from generally flat terrain to much more hilly, even at times rugged terrain with the highway cutting through several hills in Greene County.

Just southwest of Bloomington, I-69 has an interchange with SR 37, at the latter's new truncation point. From then on, the highway continues its journey northeastward, running around the western city limits of Bloomington and northeast to the city of Martinsville, where the highway runs along the south and eastern sides of the city. Continuing northeast, the highway gradually returns to flatter terrain before entering Indianapolis. The highway continues through the southwestern side of Indianapolis before merging into I-465, Indianapolis's outer beltway, at an interchange southwest of downtown.

I-69 continues, concurrent with I-465, as well as I-74, eastward along the southern side of Indianapolis, having an interchange with I-65 southwest of the city of Beech Grove. The highways then turn due north, with I-74 soon splitting off at an interchange east of Beech Grove, continuing along the eastern side of Indianapolis, having an interchange with I-70 south of the city of Lawrence, before meeting the northern, older segment of I-69 at an interchange at the northeast corner of I-465, where Binford Boulevard, a four-lane divided surface arterial that formerly carried SR 37, transitions into the I-69 freeway. Southbound at this junction, most I-69 motorists take exit 200, which was formerly known as exit 0, to remain on a freeway and reach either I-465 south (with I-69 south) or I-465 west.

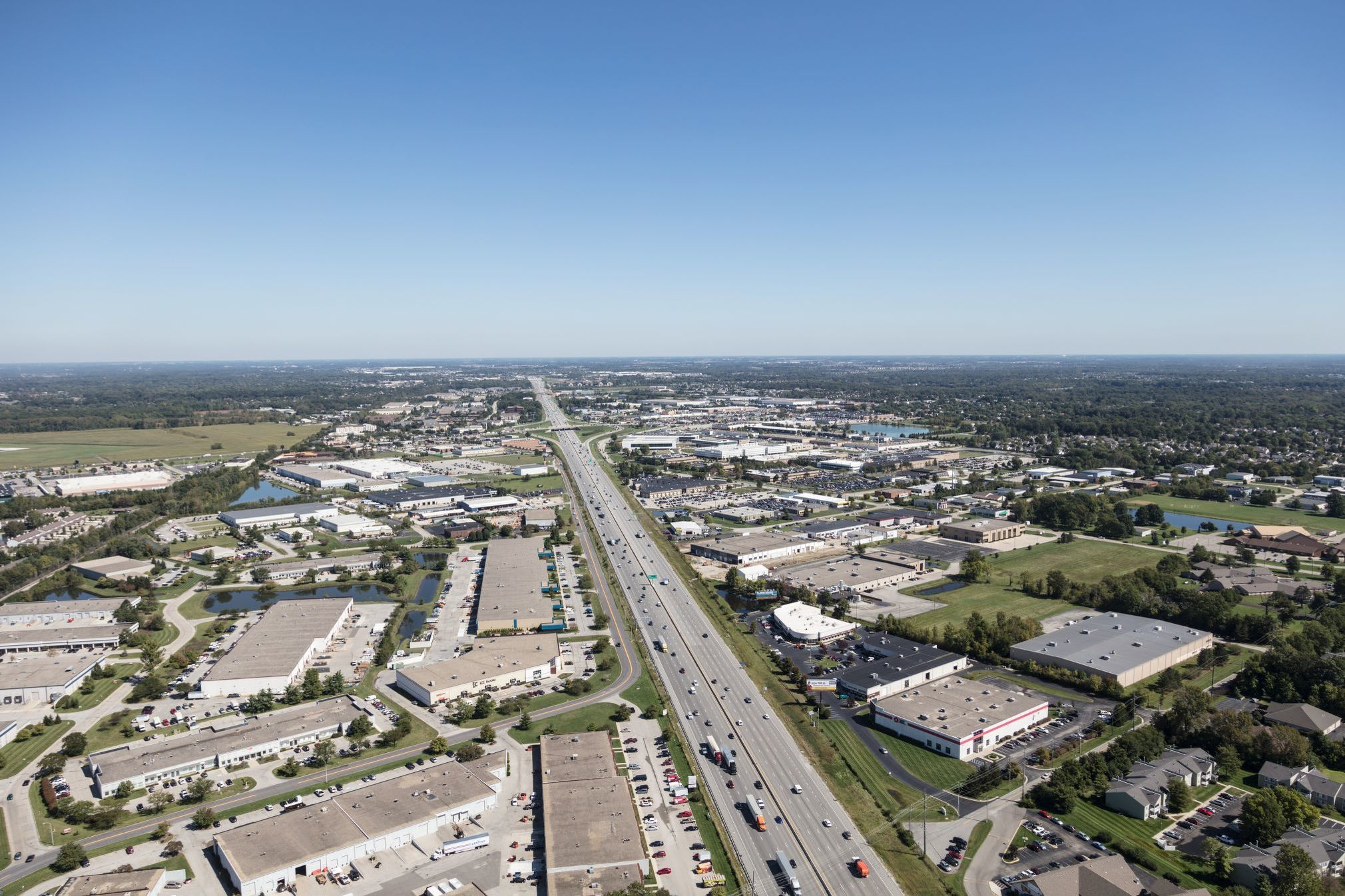
Interstate 69 on the north side of Indianapolis approaching Fishers

Continuing from the I-465 interchange in a northeasterly direction, I-69 continues through the northeastern side of Indianapolis before entering the city of Fishers. In Fishers, I-69 turns east-northeast, while the northern segment of SR 37 resumes to the north. From there, the freeway turns more easterly through the Campus Parkway/Southeastern Parkway (former Greenfield Avenue and SR 238) interchange and remains on that general heading until it reaches the Pendleton area.

After bypassing Pendleton to the west and north, SR 9 and SR 67 join I-69, which continues to the east-northeast into the Anderson area. There, SR 9 departs, and, shortly thereafter, I-69 begins two long curves to the northeast, and then the north. Between Daleville and Chesterfield, SR 67 departs I-69, bound for Muncie. From the Anderson–Muncie region, I-69 continues north, running concurrently with US 35 between SR 28 east of Alexandria and SR 22 near Gas City. After passing SR 18 east of Marion, I-69 then heads more northeast, straight toward the Fort Wayne metropolitan area.

At the south junction of I-469, located at Lafayette Center Road near General Motors Fort Wayne Assembly, US 33 joins I-69. US 24 used to be cosigned with I-69 from this point to the interchange at Jefferson Boulevard (originally known as Upper Huntington Road), even though it took travelers on that route several miles out of their way. However, in the mid-2010s, the Indiana Department of Transportation (INDOT) rerouted and resigned US 24 from its junction with I-469 in New Haven to use the northern leg of that beltway (concurrent with westbound US 30) to I-69, then south on the parent Interstate route to the aforementioned Jefferson Boulevard interchange. Now, eastbound US 24 joins northbound I-69 and US 33 there. US 33 continues north to the Goshen Road interchange near Coliseum Boulevard on the northwest side of Fort Wayne, where it departs I-69, eastbound US 30 joins, and the freeway curves more to the east once again. The next junction is the US 27/SR 3 interchange at Lima Road on the north side of Fort Wayne. From the mid-1960s to 2001, US 27 was rerouted onto a concurrency with I-69 from here north to the Michigan border, but the route was thereafter truncated to this point as its national northern terminus. Past the next interchange at Coldwater Road, which was the original routing of US 27 north of town, the I-69 freeway curves back to a northerly heading. At the north junction of I-469, both US 30 and the present routing of US 24 now depart to the east along that beltway, and shortly thereafter, I-69 leaves the Fort Wayne metro area.

I-69 then continues north, passing just to the west of Auburn, Waterloo, and Angola, before reaching I-80/I-90 (Indiana Toll Road) near Fremont. Very shortly thereafter, the route crosses into the state of Michigan at a point just northwest of Fremont.

The portion of I-69 between Indianapolis and the Toll Road was first proposed in the seminal report Interregional Highways, released in January 1944. By March 1946, it was formally made part of the new National System of Interstate Highways by the US Public Roads Administration. In 1958, its first extension was approved. This took the route into Michigan in order to connect with I-94 near Marshall. It was extended yet again, north to Lansing in the 1960s, and then east—first to Flint and finally to the border with Canada at Port Huron, Michigan—in the 1980s. The extreme southern portion of I-69 from I-465 to central Indianapolis was never built, though unpaved ghost ramps and overpasses for its connection to I-65 and I-70 at the North Split interchange just northeast of Downtown Indianapolis remained until that interchange was completely rebuilt in 2021–2023.

=== Configuration ===
Previously, all of I-69 in Indiana north of the Indianapolis metropolitan area was four lanes, but INDOT has reconstructed and widened I-69 to six lanes through most of the Fort Wayne metropolitan area by adding a travel lane in the median for each direction. Likewise, much of the stretch through Bloomington was reconstructed and widened to six lanes as it was upgraded from the original Indiana 37 highway.

In addition, INDOT has widened I-69 from I-465 on the northeast side of Indianapolis to SR 37/116th Street in Fishers from the original six to eight through lanes, with additional auxiliary lanes between interchanges. A project to add a third travel lane in the median for each direction between SR 37/116th Street and SR 38 near Pendleton, as well as to completely rebuild the Campus Parkway/Southeastern Parkway junction (exit 210) as a diverging diamond interchange (DDI) without necessitating its closure to traffic, began in 2016 and was completed in early 2018. As part of the Next Level Roads initiative, INDOT began a project in mid-2018 to extend the six-lane section north from Pendleton to SR 9 in Anderson and to rehab the existing four lanes of pavement from there to the junction of SR 67 and SR 32 near Daleville.

=== Services ===
Initially, there were seven rest areas and two weigh stations located along the original length of I-69 in Indiana. Of those, only four rest areas and one weigh station remain open at present. The Pipe Creek Rest Areas serve northbound and southbound travelers in Delaware County near mile marker 250 (formerly marker 50). Rebuilt in 2008, these areas also serve motorists on US 35, concurrent with I-69 along this stretch of freeway. Near milemarker 280 (formerly marker 80) in Huntington County, there were originally twin weigh stations for commercial vehicles; however, only the southbound facility is still used. Also in Huntington County, the northbound Flat Creek Rest Area once served those heading north near the original milemarker 89 (now marker 289) but joined its southbound companion (which had closed in January 2009 and was located a couple miles to the north in Wells County, just south of the Wells–Allen county line near original milemarker 92) on the list of permanently closed rest stops by late 2012. These areas were closed due to their age, cost of maintenance and operation, as well as their relative proximity to the Fort Wayne metropolitan area. Two other rest areas just north of that city in DeKalb County were also closed by 2001 for similar reasons. There, the twin Cedar Creek Rest Areas once served northbound and southbound traffic near the original milemarker 123 (now marker 323). In July 2011, it was reported that INDOT had begun building a new northbound facility at that location. In November 2012, it replaced the aforementioned Flat Creek northbound rest area farther to the south, which closed upon completion of this new facility at the Cedar Creek site. Finally, between Fort Wayne and the Michigan state line, the Pigeon Creek Welcome Center serves southbound motorists in Steuben County near milemarker 345 (formerly marker 145).

There are no rest stops or weigh stations on I-69 south of Indianapolis.

== History ==
=== Pre-construction (1940s–1950s) ===
In the 1944 study titled Interregional Highways and again, in 1947 when the original Interstate routes were first officially designated, I-69 had its northern terminus listed as the Indiana Toll Road. But, in 1956, highway officials of the state of Michigan approached their Indiana counterparts about extending I-69 north from the Toll Road and into their state along the route of US 27 to reach the proposed I-94 near Marshall. After some further studies, both states requested this change and the Bureau of Public Roads (BPR) approved their proposal on January 21, 1958, making the Michigan state line the new northern terminus of I-69 in Indiana and moving its national terminus permanently into Michigan.

The original southern termination point of I-69 was to have been located at the northeast corner of the inner loop (now known locally as the I-65/I-70 "North Split" interchange) near 13th Street and College Avenue in Indianapolis. Preliminary routing of the highway from SR 38 near Pendleton to Indianapolis had it generally following the SR 67 corridor southwest, joining I-70 near German Church Road on the east side of Marion County, where the two routes would then be cosigned into the city. Later route location studies in 1961 recommended a different path, heading generally west from Pendleton to SR 37 near Fishers, then southwest past the Indianapolis outer beltway concurrent with the new location of that state route (now known as Binford Boulevard). Once well into the city, it would turn south to cross Fall Creek and meet up with the inner loop at its northeast corner.

However, in 1962, the BPR ruled that it would only approve funding for I-69 to be built to the first Interstate Highway connection in the Indianapolis area, which was the I-465 outer beltway near Castleton. State officials later sought to designate the proposed Northeast Freeway connecting that I-69/I-465 interchange to the North Split interchange, approximately 11 miles (18 km) in length, as I-165 to get around this initial ruling. But, after a political fight over the inner-city portions of I-70 and I-65 (part of the national freeway revolt), it was eventually decided in the late 1970s to scrap the Northeast Freeway altogether. In its place, the state was allowed to use federal funds to widen I-70 from its original six lanes to eight and ten lanes as well as to rework its east side interchange with I-465 to handle the additional traffic loads from I-69 and the northeastern suburbs it serves.

=== Construction (1960s–1970s) ===
Like all Interstate Highways in Indiana, the original I-69 was constructed in segments which, when all were complete, made up the route that exists today north of Indianapolis. There were 11 segments in the federally approved original route between I-465 in the Castleton neighborhood of northeastern Indianapolis and the Michigan state line.

The first section of I-69 to be completed in Indiana was the 10.16-mile (16.35 km) stretch in Allen County around the west and north sides of Fort Wayne between the former Upper Huntington Road (now Jefferson Boulevard), which then carried US 24 and SR 37, and Coldwater Road, which, at the time, was US 27 (later SR 327, but now neither). This initial portion of I-69 freeway opened to traffic on October 23, 1962. The 11th and final segment (of the original route) to be completed was the 5.05-mile (8.13 km) stretch between the north leg of I-465 in Indianapolis and the split with SR 37 at Fishers, which fully opened to traffic on November 16, 1971.

=== Expansion on a national scale (1990s and beyond) ===
Long after the route's original completion, I-69 was divided into a number of SIUs dealing with a proposed extension of the freeway to the Mexican border in Texas. The original 157.30-mile (253.15 km) section of I-69 in Indiana in its entirety is now part of segment of independent utility 1 (SIU 1).

When the United States Congress enacted the Intermodal Surface and Transportation Efficiency Act in the mid-1990s, it established High Priority Corridors 18 and 20. Together, these corridors mandate the construction of an Interstate Highway from Port Huron, Michigan, to Brownsville, Texas. The new highway was designated I-69. The routing of the highway has proven to be controversial in Indiana, as it was to become a planned toll road in southern Indiana called Southern Indiana Toll Road (SITR). After nearly 10 years of studies and close coordination between the Federal Highway Administration (FHWA), the US Army Corps of Engineers (USACE), the Environmental Protection Agency (EPA), and INDOT, the final route for I-69 between Indianapolis and Evansville was announced in March 2004. At that time, it was still uncertain when the extension would be built since no funds were available to construct the $1.8-billion highway. Nonetheless, the FHWA and INDOT were extremely methodical working on in close coordination with USACE, the EPA, and other state and federal agencies on the two-tiered environmental studies required for I-69.

==== SIU 1 ====
SIU 1 includes the entire length of I-69 in 1998, from the I-465 interchange on the northeast side of Indianapolis north to Lansing, Michigan, then east to Port Huron, Michigan. It was built in stages between 1956 and 1992, with the final gap between Charlotte, Michigan, and Lansing completed on October 22, 1992. SIU 1 also includes the I-469 loop around the east side of Fort Wayne that opened in stages between 1989 and 1995. When the national I-69 extension project was conceived, SIU 1 was already long completed except for the northernmost portion of I-469 which was still under construction at the time, so the scope of future work in this segment of the "new I-69" would be limited.

==== Post-construction changes ====
A major project in the Fort Wayne metropolitan area began in 2002, resulting in an additional travel lane in each direction, bridge and pavement reconstruction, and interchange reconfiguration. Plans for SIU 1 also included spot changes and pavement rehabilitation to the I-469 loop around Fort Wayne and additional mainline and interchange changes to I-69 northeast of Indianapolis.

At the north end of the Fort Wayne section, a new dogbone interchange was built in 2012 at Union Chapel Road (exit 317) to serve the then-new Parkview Regional Medical Center campus, replacing an original grade separation without Interstate access at that location.

Just to the south of the Parkview complex, the junction at Dupont Road (exit 316) was rebuilt and converted into Indiana's first DDI by late October 2014.

On October 24, 2007, INDOT announced a $600 million (equivalent to $896 million in 2025) plan to reconstruct the I-69/I-465 interchange on the northeast side of Indianapolis that included the widening of about eight miles (13 km) of I-69, I-465, and Binford Boulevard. Environmental studies and design work were subsequently undertaken, and construction on the I-69 portion of the project was initially expected to begin in 2012. However, that portion of the plan was later scaled back, with the I-69/I-465/Binford Boulevard interchange still awaiting most of the planned changes.

In the mid-2010s, the I-69 portion of the Operation Indy Commute project attempted to address capacity issues the complete 2007 plan would have corrected, by adding two new travel lanes between 82nd Street and a rebuilt split with SR 37 as well as by adding auxiliary lanes between interchanges in this same area.

In December 2015, another new plan was announced to rebuild the I-69/I-465/Binford Boulevard interchange. Construction on the project, which was to improve safety and traffic flow, was finally initiated in early 2022 under "Clear Path 465". The project included added travel lanes, new ramp lanes, 14 new bridges, two rehabilitated bridges, maintenance work and interchange modifications, especially at the I-465/I-69/Binford Blvd interchange. Construction was scheduled to be completed by the end of 2025, but has since been pushed out to late 2026.

INDOT widened 14 miles (23 km) of I-69 from four to six lanes between the 116th Street/SR 37 interchange at Fishers and the SR 38/State Street interchange in Pendleton, a project that began in 2016 and was completed in early 2018. This contract also included the reconstruction and conversion of the interchange at Campus Parkway/Southeastern Parkway (exit 210) into I-69's second DDI while maintaining traffic flow and full access for all directional movements. As a followup, INDOT announced in 2018 that the six-lane section would be extended by another 8.4 miles (13.5 km), from Pendleton to SR 9 in Anderson. The $79-million (equivalent to $99.6 million in 2025) contract also includes pavement rehabilitation for another 6.5 miles (10.5 km) beyond that point, to the SR 67/SR 32 interchange in Daleville.

A new interchange (exit 204) at 106th Street in Fishers, constructed between April and December 2016 (with final landscaping work extending into 2017), was opened to traffic on December 7, 2016. The original two-lane grade separation without I-69 access was replaced by two separate two-lane bridges over the freeway. Each bridge carries one direction of traffic in an oval-shaped roundabout that controls traffic on 106th Street and interchange ramps to and from both directions of I-69.

==== SIU 2 ====
In 2021, INDOT confirmed SIU 2 would connect I-69 SIU 1 and SIU 3 by utilizing the eastern and southern legs of the I-465 beltway in Indianapolis. Much of this stretch of I-465 was reconstructed during the first decade of the 2000s, with additional reconstructions scheduled for the 2010s, independent of the I-69 extension project. Construction for the I-69 extension between Martinsville and Indianapolis officially began in 2019; the segment opened to traffic in early-August 2024. The southern leg of I-465 was the last major portion of the beltway that has yet to be widened from its original six-lane cross-section, and was the scene of chronic traffic congestion. In conjunction with the construction of the I-69/I-465 southwest interchange at the northern end of SIU 3, several miles of I-465 between I-70 to the west and I-65 to the east were reconstructed and widened to handle the additional traffic expected to be generated on I-465 when the last section of I-69 was completed. Construction began in 2021 on the final segment and was completed along with the I-69 interchange at the end of 2024, the I-465 south project also involved a complete reconstruction and widening of I-465 from I-65 to I-70: the roadway was reconstructed and widened to accommodate additional travel lanes; bridges and overpasses were replaced; and interchanges at SR 67 and US 31 were reconfigured.

==== Proposed alternatives to I-465 routing of SIU 2 ====
On November 9, 2006, then-Governor Mitch Daniels announced plans for a 75-mile (121 km) outer loop around Indianapolis to be known as the Indiana Commerce Connector (ICC). As proposed, that route would have been entirely privately funded, with a portion of the revenues possibly applied to constructing I-69 from Indianapolis to Naval Surface Warfare Center Crane Division (NSWC Crane Division). The remaining portion of the highway to Evansville, Indiana, was already funded with funds from the Major Moves initiative. Strong opposition from local residents and the then-Democratic-controlled House of Representatives forced Daniels to abandon the ICC plan on March 24, 2007, although House Democrats assured southwest Indiana residents that this decision would not affect construction on I-69 between Indianapolis and NSWC Crane Division. If built, the ICC or similar outer loop around Indianapolis was proposed to be designated as either I-269 or I-470.

==== SIU 3 ====
From I-465 on the southwest side of Indianapolis, I-69 follows the route of SR 37 south via Martinsville to Bloomington, at which point a new terrain routing to the southwest now serves NSWC Crane Division, Washington, and Oakland City. The route intersects I-64, at southern terminus of SIU 3. Beyond there, SIU 4 of I-69 continues south along the former I-164 freeway into Evansville, where a new toll bridge is planned to enter Kentucky and cross the Ohio River near the existing US 41 bridges (just north of which I-69 temporarily ends).

==== Tier 1 studies ====
INDOT took a two-tier approach to completing the environmental impacts documentation required for construction to proceed. During the Tier 1 studies, 14 route alternatives were analyzed and compared against the "No-Build" option. Of these alternatives, nine were eliminated from consideration as either having too great of an impact on the natural and human environment, failing to achieve the stated goals established for the I-69 extension, or both. The five alternatives that remained were as follows:

- Alternative 1 ran from US 41 to Terre Haute and along I-70 from Terre Haute to Indianapolis. This alternative was favored heavily by Terre Haute.
- Alternative 2 used US 41 to Vincennes and SR 67 from Vincennes to Indianapolis; it was favored by Princeton and Vincennes.
- Alternative 3 was one of the two mostly overland routes along SR 57, then cutting cross country on an alignment that roughly follows SR 45, to SR 37 near Bloomington and using SR 37 to Indianapolis. This proposal was largely supported by the Evansville area but opposed by a vocal minority in Bloomington. A modified version of Alternative 3 is the current path of I-69's construction.
- Alternative 4 followed SR 57 to US 231 near Bloomfield and US 231 from there to Spencer. Next, it went cross country to Martinsville and either followed SR 37 from Martinsville to Indianapolis or continued north to I-70 and used I-70 to Indianapolis. This concept had more support from the Hoosier Hills Area.
- Alternative 5 was the last studied and used SR 57 to US 50 bypass just south of Washington. Afterward, it followed US 50 eastward through Daviess and Martin counties to SR 37 just east of Bedford and then SR 37 from Bedford to Indianapolis. This alternative was favored mainly by Bedford.

In 2003, INDOT presented the Tier 1 environmental impact statement (EIS) to the FHWA, which identified Alternative 3C (following SR 37 between Indianapolis and Bloomington, then over new terrain to US 231 north of NSWC Crane Division, then following SR 57 south-southwest to the I-64/I-164 interchange northeast of Evansville) as the least environmentally damaging practical alternative. Subsequently, in March 2003, the FHWA issued a Record of Decision (ROD) approving the Tier 1 EIS for SIU 3.

In November 2005, then-Governor Mitch Daniels announced the Major Moves initiative, which would raise billions of dollars for transportation projects by leasing the Indiana Toll Road. Legislation enacted in March 2006 authorized Governor Daniels to lease the Indiana Toll Road to a joint venture between Macquarie Infrastructure Group and Cintra for $3.8 billion (equivalent to $5.83 billion in 2025). The same legislation also authorized a similar public–private partnership for the design, construction, and operation of 117 miles (188 km) of I-69 between Martinsville and Evansville as a toll expressway. This came following new highway legislation by Congress in January 2006 that allocated over $58 million (equivalent to $89 million in 2025) to modify SR 37 to a full expressway from Indianapolis to Bloomington, regardless of what happened with I-69.

Nearly 15 years of environmental studies wrapped up on both the toll and free sections of the I-69 extension between Indianapolis and Evansville in 2006; the project was still being considered as a toll road by then. Project engineers and designers were by then identifying the exact placement of interchanges, bridge structures, and connecting roads. In June 2006, officials revisited their decision from the Tier 1 EIS to account for the effects of tolling on the route, preparing a report that concluded that the previously selected route remained the preferred alternative, even with tolls; the report was approved by the FHWA in late 2006.

In October 2006, Democratic State Representatives David Crooks and Trent Van Haaften proposed revising Major Moves legislation to make the entire 142-mile (229 km) length of I-69 between Evansville and Indianapolis part of SITR. Under their proposal, SITR would be operated by either INDOT or a public authority to be established by future legislation. Additionally, the proposal called for SITR construction bonds to be paid off 30–40 years following the road's completion, at which point the tolls would be removed.

On November 9, 2006, Governor Daniels announced that I-69 between Evansville and Indianapolis would be built as a toll-free route, effectively canceling plans for SITR.

==== Studies ====
During Tier 2 studies, INDOT further divided SIU 3 into six smaller segments, allowing work on each subsegment to proceed at its own pace. On December 21, 2006, INDOT announced completion of the Tier 2 draft EIS for the 13-mile (21 km) section between I-64 and SR 64 near Oakland City. Officials further noted that they would accelerate the final EIS and construction on the southernmost two-mile (3.2 km) section from I-64 to SR 68 to facilitate access to the Toyota's Princeton plant. On April 30, Governor Daniels signed the state's two-year $26-billion (equivalent to $39.9 billion in 2025) budget, which included $119 million (equivalent to $183 million in 2025) to fund construction of the southernmost segment of I-69, ensuring that construction would begin as scheduled in the summer of 2008. The final EIS for the southernmost section was issued on October 22, 2007.

On February 10, 2008, INDOT and the FHWA issued the Tier 2 draft EIS for two sections from Oakland City to Crane, totaling 55 miles (89 km). Of the changes to the original alternative, the draft EIS extended the bridge over the Patoka River from 500 to 4,400 feet (150 to 1,340 m) to minimize damage to the river and adjacent wetlands. Construction on two rural interchanges would be postponed to free up $30 million for the extended bridge. INDOT released the 5,000-page Tier 2 final EIS for Section 3 from US 50 in Washington to US 231 near Crane on December 10, 2009. The ROD for Section 3 was issued in March 2010 and construction began in April 2010. The ROD for Section 2 (Oakland City to Washington) was issued in May 2010. In May 2010, Governor Daniels announced plans for I-69 to be open from I-64 to Bloomington by 2014 (Sections 1 through 4).

==== Lawsuits ====
Opposition groups, including various community groups and local governments, cited environmental issues and the cost of extending I-69. Opponents of SITR protested the I-69 extension, including petition signing by more than 144,000 Hoosiers along the proposed I-69 corridor and mass mailings of opposition to Governor Daniels. Other acts of protest included the vandalizing of the Indiana Statehouse by protesters who spray-painted "I-69 is the enemy" and "No I-69" on the side of the limestone building. In 2005, activists opposed to the extension set fire to I-69 project offices near Bloomington. In 2007, a group performed a mock eviction of the I-69 project office in Oakland City.

There were mixed opinions of the project. The routing was strongly opposed in Bloomington and Martinsville, while there was strong support in Evansville and Washington. The US Navy also supported the routing because it would provide access to NSWC Crane Division. The new route was also supported by the Teamsters Union, which represents many truck drivers, the American Trucking Associations, and several trade unions representing the construction industry. Some residents of Bloomington and Martinsville both opposed upgrading SR 37 to I-69. The greatest support for I-69 was in Indiana's far southwestern counties and Evansville. Since the southwest corner was the only region not served by an Interstate Highway to Indianapolis, officials in southwest Indiana contended that highway opponents were blocking I-69 construction in an attempt to further isolate the region from the remainder of the state. To the west, communities along US 41 favored the presently selected alignment in lieu of the only other feasible routing: I-70 to Terre Haute, then US 41 south to Evansville.

After the signing of Major Moves, highway opponents immediately filed two lawsuits to block the toll road lease legislation, arguing it violated the Indiana Constitution. Among the arguments, the plaintiffs contested that funds generated from the sale of a state public works asset must go to the state's General Fund. In May 2006, St. Joseph County Superior Court Judge Michael Scopelitis issued a ruling declaring it a public suit (one that questions a public improvement) and, as such, required the plaintiffs to post a $1.9-billion (equivalent to $2.91 billion in 2025) bond to continue the suit. In response, plaintiffs appealed the ruling to the Indiana Supreme Court, which upheld the lower court's ruling. With no means for the opposition to post the bond, Major Moves, and thus the proceeding of SITR, took effect with the closing of the deal on June 29, 2006.

On October 3, 2006, protest groups, citing environmental concerns, along with six individuals who live along the I-69 corridor, filed a lawsuit in federal court, alleging that state and federal agencies rigged environmental studies and violated several federal laws in the selection of a new-terrain route for I-69. They pressed the court for a summary ruling directing the FHWA and INDOT to route I-69 over I-70 and US 41. Judge David Hamilton disagreed, and on December 10, 2007, he issued a 58-page ruling upholding the selected route for I-69 and the Tier 1 ROD. His ruling did, however, leave open the possibility that the FHWA and INDOT could be forced to reconsider some or all of the previously rejected Tier 1 alternatives if there were new significant findings during the Tier 2 studies that were absent from the Tier 1 EIS. Judge Hamilton's ruling paved the way for construction to begin on the southernmost segment.

==== Construction begins ====
On December 12, 2007, the FHWA issued its ROD, giving final federal approval for construction to begin on the section between I-64/I-164 and SR 64 near Oakland City. INDOT awarded the first SIU 3 construction contract to Gohmann Asphalt and Construction Company of Sellersburg, Indiana, on February 6, 2008. This contract, completed on May 31, 2008, included the removal of buildings and vegetation from the I-69 right-of-way between I-64 and SR 68. Gohmann also won the construction contract for the first two miles (3.2 km) from I-64 to SR 68 with a $25-million (equivalent to $36.7 million in 2025) bid. Construction began with a groundbreaking ceremony in Evansville on July 16, 2008. INDOT built this first section of the extension of I-69 using the design–build method.

==== The first open segment ====
On September 29, 2009, the first two miles (3.2 km) of the I-69 extension opened when traffic was shifted from the short segment of SR 57 between I-64 and SR 68 to the portion of the new I-69 route mentioned above. There was some initial confusion as the shift and detour were unannounced and poorly signed initially. This resulted in numerous accidents when motorists either drove through the dead end on the old SR 57 or inadvertently ended up in opposing lanes of traffic on I-164 in the days following the I-69 opening. State troopers directed traffic through the new I-69 segment until crews could install additional signage to more clearly mark the new route. The former SR 57 roadway between SR 68 and I-64 was closed off with a cul-de-sac and now serves as a local access road.

==== Completion to Bloomington ====
The remaining mileage in Section 1, along with all of Section 2 and Section 3, for a total of 64 miles (103 km) from SR 64 to US 231 near NSWC Crane Division, was opened to motorists on November 19, 2012.

Section 4, from Crane to SR 37 in Bloomington, approximately 27 miles (43 km) in length, was expected to be completed and opened to traffic in 2014 but complications with wet weather delayed completion and opening to December 9, 2015.

==== Section 5 ====
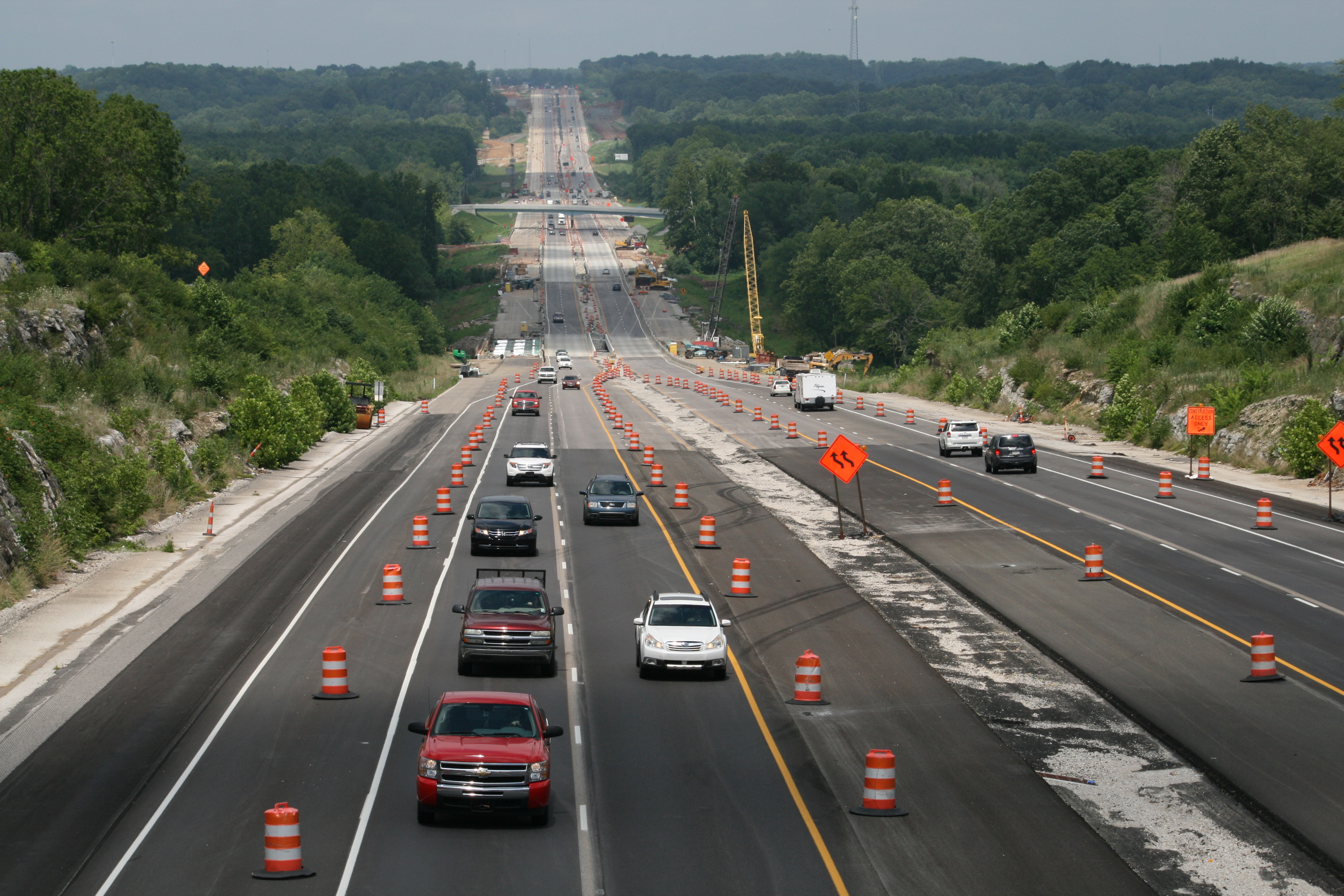
Section 5 under construction in Monroe County (2017)

Construction on Section 5 to rebuild SR 37 through Bloomington to Martinsville to Interstate standards at a cost of $425 million (equivalent to $536 million in 2025) was completed October 31, 2018. Under a public-private partnership, I-69 Development Partners was originally responsible for the section's construction. However, the partnership experienced multiple delays from the original completion date of October 2016 due to financial and other difficulties, including several work stoppages by subcontractors who cited a lack of being paid in the agreed to manner by the private group. On August 14, 2017, the state of Indiana terminated the P3 arrangement with I-69 Development Partners, citing default on the contract terms and construction being delayed two years from the initial October 2016 completion deadline. INDOT assumed direct oversight of Section 5 construction and contracted with Walsh Construction to serve as the prime contractor for the remainder of the project. Walsh oversaw several subcontractors retained from the I-69 Development Partners P3 arrangement that performed the earthworks, structure erection, paving, and other work to complete Section 5. As work wrapped up, the FHWA approved the designation of the highway as I-69 up to Martinsville on September 18, 2018, and signage was installed.

==== Section 6 ====
The routing of Section 6 of I-69 from Martinsville to Indianapolis was again studied by INDOT, with five candidate finalist routes selected from nearly two dozen options. On March 30, 2016, INDOT announced that I-69 would complete its route to Indianapolis following the current right-of-way of the SR 37 expressway. The Interstate would be constructed along the path of SR 37 from Martinsville—through Morgan, northwest Johnson, and southwest Marion counties—connecting with I-465. The only significant deviation from the alignment of SR 37 was just south of the junction at I-465, where the freeway deviates slightly to the west to allow the Harding Street interchange of I-465 to remain, with only slight modification to its western ramps. The freeway has two lanes in each direction in Morgan County, three in each direction from Smith Valley Road to Southport Road in Marion County, and four in each direction from Southport Road to I-465. INDOT reported that studies showed that this preferred routing would reduce crashes and congestion the most, affect less forest and farm acreage, and result in the greatest decrease in travel time. The SR 37 routing also reduced the cost of the project by eliminating the need for a bridge over the White River between Martinsville and I-465. However, the path also impacted the most businesses, which had been a concern raised by Martinsville residents, business owners, and lawmakers. The total cost of Section 6 was estimated to be $1.5 billion, which includes $700 to $800 million in actual construction costs, with an initial completion date of 2025. INDOT subsequently moved the planned completion date to 2024.

Unlike the P3 arrangement initially sought for Section 5, Section 6 was built through traditional procurement methods, with five contracts left over several fiscal years. On February 8, 2018, a combined Tier 2 final EIS and ROD was published for Section 6. On September 4, 2018, $600 million (equivalent to $757 million in 2025) in funding for I-69 Section 6 was announced by Indiana Governor Eric Holcomb, with a goal of speeding up Section 6 completion to 2024. Construction of access roads and changes to local roads in the corridor began in Martinsville in 2019. Construction of the freeway itself began in Morgan and Johnson counties in 2020. The project for Section 6 is known as "I-69 Finish Line". INDOT closed SR 37 between Morgan Street and SR 39 in Martinsville starting on January 2, 2021, to enable the construction of I-69 through Martinsville to be completed in one construction season versus two seasons had SR 37 been kept open. This stretch was opened to traffic in stages in late December 2021. The northbound lanes were opened to traffic on December 20 following a ribbon-cutting ceremony with Governor Holcomb, and the southbound lanes were opened to traffic on December 23. A year later in December 2022, the Road and Bridges Magazine designated it as the top road project for 2022. On December 16, 2022, over twelve miles (19 km) of SR 37 between SR 44 in Martinsville and SR 144 in Bargersville were officially signed as I-69 during an opening ceremony. The full roundabout at the SR 144 exit was opened on June 13, 2023. Start of construction of I-69 and the I-69/I-465 interchange in Marion County began in early 2021 and included the reconstruction and widening of nine miles (14 km) of I-465 between I-70 to the west and I-65 to the east. The new roadway connecting I-69 and I-465 opened in early-August 2024, with the southbound connections opening on August 6 and the northbound connections opening on August 9. Construction and widening on I-465 will continued through the end of 2024, but I-69 was signed along SR 37 and I-465.

==== Financing construction ====
To fund the construction of this extension, Indiana Governor Daniels introduced a proposal known as "Major Moves" in early 2006. It provided $700 million (equivalent to $1.07 billion in 2025) from the Indiana Toll Road lease to be used to complete nearly 20 years of environmental studies and construct about half of the proposed extension (between the I-64/164 interchange and NSWC Crane Division). It also allowed for the construction of 117 miles (188 km) of the 142-mile (229 km) I-69 extension to Evansville to be constructed as the SITR. Due to ongoing controversy over making this portion of the extension a toll road, the governor announced in November 2006 that the entire stretch of the highway would be toll-free, subject to construction of the ICC (SIU 2). Officials with INDOT have since stated that I-69 will be toll-free regardless of whether or not the ICC is constructed. Additionally, the US Congress allocated an additional $14 million (equivalent to $22.1 million in 2025) in the 2005 SAFETEA-LU authorization to construct I-69 Evansville to Indianapolis.

The 2014–2015 Indiana State budget placed $400 million (equivalent to $530 million in 2025) in a "Major Moves 2020" fund, some of which went towards completing I-69. INDOT and the Indiana Finance Authority released a request for qualifications on May 23, 2013, for a public–private partnership agreement to complete the 26 miles (42 km) of Section 5 of SIU 3, with four proposals shortlisted on July 31, 2013.

==== Designation extension ====
In April 2010, INDOT petitioned the FHWA and the American Association of State Highway and Transportation Officials (AASHTO) to change the designation of the I-69 extension from "Proposed Route 69" to "Interstate 69", citing the two miles (3.2 km) of the extension already open to traffic and a total of 107 miles (172 km) out of 183 miles (295 km) from the southern terminus of the original I-69 to the Ohio River near Evansville that would be open by the end of 2012. The ruling allowed INDOT to erect I-69 signs on portions of I-465 between the current interchange with I-69 in the northeast and the proposed interchange on the southwest, and reset reference posts (RP) and renumber exits and reference posts on the original section north of Indianapolis (starting with RP 200 instead of the then-current RP 0). The latter task was accomplished by the end of 2012.

==== SIU 4 ====
Interstate 164
- Location: Evansville
- Length: 21.39 mi (34.42 km)
- Existed: 1968–2014

This section of I-69 incorporated the former I-164, a spur highway of I-64, between that highway and US 41 in Evansville. I-164, also known as the Robert D. Orr Highway, had a total length of 21.24 miles (34.18 km) and was the only auxiliary route of I-64 in Indiana. Requested as an Interstate and approved in 1968, the freeway was opened to traffic on August 2, 1990.

At the October 18, 2013, AASHTO meeting, an INDOT request for a redesignation of 20.70 miles (33.31 km) of I-164 to I-69 between US 41 and I-64 was approved, pending concurrence from the FHWA. On November 15, 2013, INDOT announced that I-164 would become part of I-69, an action completed in late 2014. Signage was changed to I-69 beginning the week of November 17, 2014. When the I-69 Ohio River Crossing is complete roughly 2.5 miles (4.0 km) east of US 41, the remainder of the former spur will become an extension of Veterans Memorial Parkway.

==== I-69 Ohio River Crossing (I-69 ORX) ====
The original plan (in a draft EIS prepared by INDOT in 2004 but later dropped) was for I-69 to leave the now-former I-164 alignment somewhere just east of Green River Road (exit 3) and head south (instead of turning west with I-164) for approximately three miles (4.8 km) before crossing the Ohio River at a point near the mouth of the Green River. This portion of the route had not then been funded, as construction of the new Ohio River crossing and its approaches in both states was expected to cost approximately $800 million. Indiana and Kentucky officials had said construction on the new Ohio River Bridge would not begin until at least 2020 after two new crossings near Louisville were completed. With Indiana then preparing to break ground on SIU 3, Kentucky officials indicated that collecting tolls might be the only feasible option for completing the I-69 bridge, as traditional federal and state funding for such projects were drying up. As of February 2013, neither Kentucky nor Indiana officials had yet come up with the money to plan and construct this I-69 bridge.

In 2016, both states initiated a renewed push to build the bridge, and the present I-69 Ohio River Crossing (I-69 ORX) project was born. The process was broadened to study several alternative alignments for the river crossing and the possibility of making it a tolled facility was approved. As of February 2018, a new draft EIS was in the process of being prepared, a project website had been set up, public involvement and input were being solicited, and the preliminary routing alternatives had been narrowed to three. By June of that year, refinements had been made in all three proposed alternatives based on public input and additional engineering data. On December 14, 2018, the central corridor was chosen as the preferred route with an estimated cost of $1.5 billion for a new terrain bridge east of existing US 41.

Groundbreaking on Section 1 of the ORX project was in June 2022. Section 1 focuses on the Kentucky approaches with improvements in Henderson and an extension of I-69 from KY 425 to US 60 of over six miles (9.7 km) including new interchanges with US 41 and US 60 and a reconstructed KY 351 interchange. Section 2 is the bistate project between Indiana and Kentucky that will complete the I-69 connection from US 60 in Henderson to I-69 in Evansville, which includes the new river crossing. Design is expected to begin in 2025 with construction anticipated to begin in 2027 and continue through 2031. Both states are looking for opportunities to accelerate the timeline. When the Ohio River Crossing is complete, roughly 2.5 miles (4.0 km) east of US 41, the remainder of the former will become an extension of Veterans Memorial Parkway. Section 3 is the bridge approach construction in Indiana. Design work and pre-construction activities are underway. INDOT is overseeing this section and construction was expected to begin in 2024 and end in 2027. In late November 2023, Indiana awarded a nearly $202 million contract to ORX Constructors to build their approach bridges and roadway; construction will begin by summer 2024 with completion set for 2026.

== Controversies ==
The routing for SIU 3 of I-69 in Indiana was particularly controversial. The planned extension to Evansville pitted cities, towns, and counties against one another. The greatest support for an extended I-69 was in Indiana's far southwestern counties and Evansville, while the greatest opposition was between Indianapolis and Bloomington. Some in Bloomington and Martinsville opposed changing SR 37 to I-69, while still others welcomed this. The opposition led to Southwestern Indiana highway activists accusing highway opponents farther north of trying to isolate this region from the rest of the state by blocking the construction of a direct highway link to Indianapolis. To the west, communities along US 41 favored the selected alignment in lieu of the only other feasible routing: I-70 to Terre Haute, then US 41 south to Evansville. Terre Haute preferred the I-70/US 41 routing over the selected routing of I-69 for local economic reasons. Despite the SR 37 routing ultimately being chosen, an Interstate-quality bypass was built east of Terre Haute (SR 641) to connect US 41 and I-70, bypassing the Honey Creek development.

INDOT, current and past governors, businesses, and elected officials in Evansville and adjacent southwest Indiana communities favored a direct route via Bloomington that would be built over new terrain from Bloomington to Evansville. Highway advocates argued that this direct route reduces the travel time to Indianapolis as well as improves access to Bloomington for residents of southwestern Indiana, something a route via Terre Haute would not achieve. INDOT officials also pointed out that SR 37 would eventually be rebuilt from a four-lane expressway to full freeway status with or without I-69. After an extensive review of the alternative routes as well as detailed environmental studies, the state selected the new terrain route via Bloomington.

Opponents pointed out that the construction of I-69 would lead to the destruction of 1,500 acres (610 ha) of forest and more than 300 acres (120 ha) of wetlands. The route selected, as of 2010, passes through the Patoka River National Wildlife Refuge but on a corridor that the federal government purposely did not acquire for the refuge. This was because of an agreement with the state not to dispute the passage of a highway on this corridor. Environmental groups then filed suit in federal court on October 2, 2006, to block further study and construction of the route, but the lawsuit was dismissed by US District Judge David F. Hamilton on December 12, 2007, clearing the way for construction to begin in 2008. Opponents had considered appealing Judge Hamilton's ruling to the US Court of Appeals for the Seventh Circuit (which could have possibly sent the case to the US Supreme Court), but they ultimately abandoned further legal challenges to the proposed route. Instead, opponents tried to block construction through the legislative process, when Democrats in the Indiana House of Representatives stripped funding for the I-69 extension in their version of the 2008 two-year state budget. Money for I-69 was restored after budget negotiations with the Republican-controlled Indiana Senate.

Another area of controversy arose in late 2005 when governor Mitch Daniels proposed levying tolls on the highway to finance its construction, either as a state project or a public–private partnership, to accelerate the project. As the route would overlay the existing SR 37 between Bloomington and Indianapolis, and there is no other free alternative route between Bloomington and Martinsville, this proposal raised concerns among some local residents and businesses. In March 2006, Daniels signed a bill known as "Major Moves" that leased the Indiana Toll Road but also included a compromise on constructing I-69 in southwest Indiana. As part of the deal, the legislation permitted the Governor to enter a similar public–private partnership for construction of 117 miles (188 km) of I-69 as the SITR from Martinsville to the I-64/I-164 interchange, while the remaining 25 miles (40 km) from Martinsville to the I-465/SR 37 interchange in Indianapolis would remain toll-free. On June 20, 2006, the Indiana Supreme Court rejected a legal challenge brought on by I-69 opponents, upholding Major Moves legislation in a 4–0 decision. The toll road option was highly unpopular, even among many who supported the extension via Bloomington. As a result, Governor Daniels announced in December 2006 that I-69 through southwest Indiana would be toll-free.

=== Protests ===
While Citizens for Appropriate Rural Roads had continued to rally crowds of opponents to appear at public hearings, other groups and individuals conducted acts of vandalism, ranging from spray-painting graffiti on the Indiana Statehouse in June 2005, to the breaking of windows of a private pro-I-69 business in Evansville in June 2008, to attempted arson at the I-69 regional planning office in Bloomington in July 2005. In the case of the Statehouse incident, two dozen protesters were arrested on charges ranging from disorderly conduct to an assault on a police officer. In addition to incidents in Indianapolis, numerous incidents have also occurred in and around the construction sites in Gibson County. Especially active was a group called Roadblock Earth First which was responsible for a number of incidents in Oakland City and at a Haubstadt asphalt yard given the contract for the first segment. In 2009, two protesters were arrested on charges of felony racketeering for disrupting public meetings in 2007 and 2008. These protests and acts of vandalism were viewed by some as an effort to intimidate proponents of I-69.

== Exit list ==
Exit numbers on the new southern section of I-69 are a continuation of the old I-164 exit numbering. Starting on August 6, 2012, the state of Indiana began renumbering all exits and reference posts on the original route of I-69 from I-465 to the Michigan state line by adding 200 to each value; it was decided to add an even 200 despite the fact that the new extension is only 184 miles (296 km) to minimize confusion.

The last remaining indications of the highway's completion began to be put up in May, 2024 when highway directional signs that for over 10 years simply said "I-69 North" were changed out with signs saying "Indianapolis", signifying that there was no longer a gap. In September, mileage signs both to Indianapolis and to Evansville began to be installed.

County	Location	mi	km	Old exit	New exit	Destinations	Notes
Ohio River		0.00	0.00	—	—	I-69 south – Fulton	Future continuation into Kentucky; to be finished by 2031
Ohio River		0.00	0.00	I-69 Ohio River Crossing; Indiana–Kentucky line			
Vanderburgh	Evansville			Continuation beyond temporary southern terminus			
Vanderburgh	Evansville	0.000	0.000	—	—	Veterans Memorial Parkway – Downtown Evansville	Current southern terminus
Vanderburgh	Evansville	0.690	1.110	—	0	US 41 – Vincennes, Henderson, KY	
Vanderburgh	Evansville	3.577	5.757	—	3	Green River Road	
Warrick	Ohio Township	6.339	10.202	—	5	SR 662 east (Covert Avenue)	
Vanderburgh	Evansville	7.857	12.645	—	7	SR 66 (Lloyd Expressway)	Signed as exits 7A (east) and 7B (west)
Vanderburgh	Knight Township	9.439	15.191	—	9	SR 62 (Morgan Avenue)	38th Parallel sign located at north end of interchange.
Vanderburgh	Knight Township	10.551	16.980	—	10	Lynch Road	
Vanderburgh	Scott Township	15.867	25.535	—	15	Boonville–New Harmony Road	
Vanderburgh	Scott Township	19.329	31.107	—	18	SR 57 south	Southern end of SR 57 concurrency; formerly signed as exit 19 southbound
Gibson–Warrick county line	Johnson–Greer township line	21.493– 21.878	34.590– 35.209	—	21	I-64 – Louisville, St. Louis	I-64 exits 29A-B; signed as exits 21A (east) and 21B (west)
Gibson–Warrick county line	Johnson–Greer township line	23.230	37.385	—	22	SR 57 north / SR 68 – Haubstadt, Lynnville	Northern end of SR 57 concurrency; northern terminus prior to November 19, 2012
Gibson	Barton Township	27.951	44.983	—	27	SR 168 – Fort Branch, Mackey, Owensville	
Gibson	Columbia Township	33.700	54.235	—	33	SR 64 – Princeton, Huntingburg, Oakland City University	
Pike	Washington Township	46.616	75.021	—	46	SR 56 / SR 61 – Jasper, Petersburg	
Daviess	Washington	62.618	100.774	—	62	US 50 / US 150 – Washington, Vincennes	
Daviess	Elmore Township	76.620	123.308	—	76	SR 58 – Elnora, Odon	
Greene	Taylor Township	87.831	141.350	—	87	US 231 – Loogootee, Bloomfield, NSA Crane, Jasper, Crane	Northern terminus from November 19, 2012, to December 9, 2015
Greene	Scotland	98.994	159.315	—	98	SR 45	
Greene	Cincinnati	104.401	168.017	—	104	SR 445 west	
Monroe	Bloomington	114.898	184.910	—	114	SR 37 south – Bedford	Southern end of unsigned SR 37 concurrency; northern terminus from December 9, 2015, to September 18, 2018
Monroe	Bloomington	116.098	186.842	—	115	Fullerton Pike	Interchange opened on August 6, 2017
Monroe	Bloomington	116.898	188.129	—	116	Tapp Road	Interchange opened on June 1, 2018
Monroe	Bloomington	118.198	190.221	—	117	SR 45 south / Bloomfield Road/2nd Street	Southern end of SR 45 concurrency
Monroe	Bloomington	118.998	191.509	—	118	SR 48 west / 3rd Street	Eastern end of middle segment of SR 48
Monroe	Bloomington	120.898	194.566	—	120	SR 45 north / SR 46 – Ellettsville, Spencer, Bloomington	Northern end of SR 45 concurrency; Exits signed as 120A (east) and 120B (west)
Monroe	Bloomington	124.698	200.682	—	123	College Avenue/Walnut Street	Southbound exit, northbound entrance from Walnut Street
Monroe	Washington Township	126.798	204.062	—	125	Sample Road	Full interchange opened July 14, 2018
Morgan	Washington Township	135.098	217.419	—	134	Liberty Church Road	Opened August 7, 2018; northern terminus near this interchange from August 31, 2018, to December 20, 2021
Morgan	Martinsville	136.78	220.13	—	137	SR 39 north to SR 67 – Martinsville	Opened on December 20 (northbound) and December 23, 2021 (southbound); southern terminus of SR 39
Morgan	Martinsville	138.05	222.17	—	138	Ohio Street / Artesian Avenue	Opened on December 20 (northbound) and December 23, 2021 (southbound)
Morgan	Martinsville	139.70– 140.23	224.83– 225.68	—	140	SR 252 east / Hospital Drive – Morgantown SR 44 east / Reuben Drive – Franklin	Western terminus of SR 252 and SR 44; opened on December 20 (northbound) and December 23, 2021 (southbound); SR 44 ramps are a diamond design using north half of the dogbone interchange with SR 252 as partial collector-distributor lanes; northern terminus from December 20, 2021, to December 16, 2022
Morgan	Green Township	144.8	233.0	—	145	Henderson Ford Road	Interchange fully opened in December 2021
Johnson	Bargersville	152.7	245.7	—	153	SR 144 west – Mooresville, Bargersville	Eastern terminus of SR 144, completed on December 16, 2022. Northern terminus from December 16, 2022 to August 9, 2024
Johnson	Smith Valley	155.8	250.7	—	156	Smith Valley Road	Southbound exit and entrance opened on August 16, 2023; northbound exit opened on November 13, 2023 and northbound entrance opened on November 17, 2023
Marion	Indianapolis	158.5	255.1	—	158	County Line Road	Southbound exit and entrance opened on June 1, 2022; rest of the interchange opened on August 3, 2022
Marion	Indianapolis	160.2	257.8	—	160	Southport Road	Interchange opened; southbound exit opened to traffic on November 11, 2022; rest of interchange opened on December 6, 2023
Marion	Indianapolis	161.8	260.4	—	162	Epler Avenue to Harding Street	Opened August 6 and 9, 2024; northbound exit and southbound entrance
Marion	Indianapolis	162.2	261.0	—	163	I-465 west / I-74 west - Peoria	Southern end of I-74/I-465/US 36/US 40/SR 67 concurrencies, I-465 exit 5, opened August 6 and 9, 2024
Marion	Indianapolis	163.5	263.1	—	4	Harding Street	Exit number follows I-465; southbound exit and northbound entrance
Marion	Indianapolis	165.1	265.7	—	2	US 31 south (East Street)	Exit number follows I-465; southern end of US 31 concurrency; signed as exits 2A (north) and 2B (south)
Marion	Indianapolis	167.3	269.2	—	53	I-65 – Indianapolis, Louisville	Exit number follows I-465; concurrency signed as exits 53A (north) and 53B (south)
Marion	Beech Grove	168.6	271.3	—	52	Emerson Avenue	Exit number follows I-465; single-point urban interchange
Marion	Indianapolis	171.6	276.2	—	49	I-74 east / US 421 south – Cincinnati; Southeastern Avenue	Exit number follows I-465, northern end of I-74 concurrency, southern end of US 421 concurrency
Marion	Indianapolis	172.5	277.6	—	48	Shadeland Avenue	Exit number follows I-465, northbound exit and southbound entrance; former SR 100
Marion	Indianapolis	173.2	278.7	—	47	US 52 east (Brookville Road)	Exit number follows I-465, southern end of US 52 concurrency
Marion	Indianapolis	175.1	281.8	—	46	US 40 east (Washington Street)	Exit number follows I-465, northern end of US 40 concurrency
Marion	Indianapolis	176.5	284.0	—	44	I-70 – Indianapolis, Dayton	Exit number follows I-465, I-70 eastbound exit 89, westbound exit 90; signed northbound as exits 44A (east) & 44B (west)
Marion	Lawrence	178.9	287.9	—	42	US 36 east / SR 67 north (Pendleton Pike)	Exit number follows I-465, northern end of US 36/SR 67 concurrency
Marion	Indianapolis	180.2	290.0	—	40	56th Street; Shadeland Avenue	Exit number follows I-465, full access to and from 56th Street; directional access (northbound to northbound and southbound to southbound) only for Shadeland Avenue (former SR 100)
Marion	Indianapolis	183.5– 184.000	295.3– 296.119	0	200	I-465 west	North end of I-465/US 31/US 52/US 421 concurrency; southbound exit and northbound entrance; I-465 exit 37A; former southern terminus
Marion	Indianapolis	184.842– 184.856	297.474– 297.497	1	201	Binford Boulevard / 82nd Street	Southbound exit and northbound exit; Former SR 37 along Binford Boulevard; I-465 exit 37B
Marion–Hamilton county line	Indianapolis–Fishers line	186.579	300.270	3	203	96th Street	
Hamilton	Fishers	187.756	302.164	—	204	106th Street	Roundabout interchange; opened to traffic on December 7, 2016
Hamilton	Fishers	188.937– 189.494	304.065– 304.961	5	205	116th Street SR 37 north – Noblesville	Northern end of unsigned SR 37 concurrency; complete access to 116th Street; SR 37 northbound exit and southbound entrance via collector-distributor lanes
Hamilton	Fall Creek Township	190.146– 190.152	306.010– 306.020	10	210	Campus Parkway, Southeastern Parkway to 146th Street	Diverging diamond interchange; former SR 238 (Greenfield Avenue)
Madison	Green Township	198.445	319.366	14	214	SR 13 – Fortville, Lapel	
Madison	Pendleton	202.714	326.237	19	219	SR 38 west – Pendleton, Noblesville	Southern end of SR 38 concurrency
Madison	Pendleton	206.439	332.231	22	222	SR 9 south / SR 67 south / SR 38 east – Pendleton, Anderson	Southern end of SR 9/SR 67 concurrency, northern end of SR 38 concurrency
Madison	Anderson	210.273	338.402	26	226	SR 9 north / SR 109 south – Anderson	Northern end of SR 9 concurrency
Delaware	Daleville	217.486– 233.784	350.010– 376.239	34	234	SR 67 north – Muncie; SR 32 – Anderson, Muncie	Northern end of SR 67 concurrency; SR 32 ramps are a folded diamond design using north half of the diamond interchange with SR 67 as partial collector-distributor lanes
Delaware	Mount Pleasant–Harrison township line	224.978	362.067	41	241	SR 332 east / McGalliard Road – Frankton, Muncie	
Delaware	Harrison Township	228.778	368.183	45	245	US 35 south / SR 28 – Muncie, Alexandria, Albany	Southern end of US 35 concurrency
Grant	Jefferson Township	239.019	384.664	55	255	SR 26 – Fairmount, Hartford City	
Grant	Monroe Township	243.114	391.254	59	259	US 35 north / SR 22 – Gas City, Upland	Northern end of US 35 concurrency
Grant	Monroe Township	248.140	399.343	64	264	SR 18 – Marion, Montpelier	
Huntington	Jefferson Township	256.859	413.374	73	273	SR 5 / SR 218 – Warren	
Huntington	Salamonie Township	261.540	420.908	78	278	SR 5 – Huntington, Warren	
Huntington	Markle	270.394	435.157	86	286	US 224 – Huntington, Decatur	
Wells	No major junctions						
Allen	Lafayette Township	280.515	451.445	96	296	I-469 east / US 33 south Lafayette Center Road west – Roanoke	Signed as exits 296A (I-469/US 33) and 296B (Lafayette Center Road); southern terminus of I-469, exit 0; southern end of US 33 concurrency
Allen	Lafayette Township	283.049	455.523	99	299	Airport Expressway – Lower Huntington Road	To Fort Wayne International Airport
Allen	Fort Wayne	286.060	460.369	102	302	US 24 west / Jefferson Boulevard – Huntington, Fort Wayne	Southern end of US 24 concurrency
Allen	Fort Wayne	289.297	465.578	105	305	SR 14 west / Illinois Road – South Whitley	Eastern terminus of SR 14; formerly a cloverleaf interchange, improved to a Parclo A4 interchange by removing the NW & SE loop ramps. Improvements were completed in the second half of 2021
Allen	Fort Wayne	293.253	471.945	109	309	SR 930 east / Goshen Road – Fort Wayne US 30 west / US 33 north – Columbia City, Elkhart	Signed as exits 309A (SR 930) and 309B (US 30, US 33); western terminus of SR 930; northern end of US 33 concurrency; southern end of US 30 concurrency
Allen	Fort Wayne	295.034	474.811	111	311	US 27 south / Lima Road – Fort Wayne SR 3 north / Lima Road – Kendallville	Signed as exits 311A (US 27) and 311B (SR 3); northern terminus of US 27 and southern terminus of SR 3
Allen	Fort Wayne	296.336	476.907	112	312	Coldwater Road	Signed as exits 312A (south) and 312B (north) northbound
Allen	Fort Wayne	299.079	481.321	115	315	I-469 east / US 24 east / US 30 east	Northern terminus of I-469, exit 31; northern end of US 24 and US 30 concurrency
Allen	Fort Wayne	299.799	482.480	116	316	SR 1 north / Dupont Rd	Diverging diamond interchange
Allen	Perry Township	301.266– 301.276	484.841– 484.857	—	317	Union Chapel Road	Dogbone interchange; opened to traffic throughout 2012-2013, fully open to traffic in August 2013
DeKalb	Keyser Township	310.261	499.317	126	326	CR 11-A	
DeKalb	Auburn	313.026	503.767	129	329	SR 8 – Garrett, Auburn	
DeKalb	Grant–Smithfield township line	318.329	512.301	134	334	US 6 – Kendallville, Waterloo	
DeKalb–Steuben county line	Smithfield–Steuben township line	340.378	547.785	140	340	SR 4 west – Ashley, Hudson, Hamilton	
Steuben	Pleasant Township	331.995	534.294	148	348	US 20 – Lagrange, Angola	
Steuben	Pleasant Township	334.411	538.182	150	350	CR 200 West	
Steuben	Jamestown Township	338.025	543.999	154	354	SR 127 to SR 120 / SR 727 – Orland, Fremont, Angola, Pokagon State Park	
Steuben	Jamestown Township	340.061	547.275	156	356	I-80 Toll / I-90 Toll / Indiana Toll Road – Chicago, Toledo	Toll Road exit 144; double trumpet design in southeast quadrant of junction; additional ramps connect SR 120 and SR 127 with Toll Road; actual junction (I-69 under Toll Road) at milepoint 355.62
Steuben	Jamestown Township	340.925	548.666	157	357	Lake George Road – Jamestown	
Steuben	Jamestown Township	341.824	550.112	—	—	I-69 north – Lansing	Continuation into Michigan
1.000 mi = 1.609 km; 1.000 km = 0.621 mi: Concurrency terminus; Incomplete access; Unopened

== Related routes ==
=== Auxiliary route ===
There is one auxiliary Interstate Highway for I-69 in Indiana, I-469, the beltway around the south, east, and north sides of Fort Wayne.

=== Indiana Commerce Connector ===
The Indiana Commerce Connector (ICC) was a proposed 75-mile (121 km), Interstate-grade, partial outer beltway on the south and east sides of Indianapolis that was put forward by Governor Mitch Daniels in November 2006. The proposed road segment likely would have been numbered either I-269 or I-470 and connected four Interstate Highways at six locations. Proposed as a privately built toll road, it would have extended southward from Pendleton at I-69, through Greenfield at I-70, Shelbyville at I-74, Franklin at I-65, Martinsville at I-69, to a southern terminus at I-70 near Mooresville. On March 24, 2007, Governor Daniels withdrew the proposal for the ICC due to lack of public support.

In April 2014, the logistics group Connexus Indiana and others came out in favor of reactivating the proposal for the ICC. However, the Indy Chamber (formerly the Indianapolis Chamber of Commerce) was among those who stated opposition to the plan.

== Notes ==
Interstate 69
Previous state: Kentucky	Indiana	Next state: Michigan
