= Indiana State Road 127 =

Highway in Indiana

State Road 127
- SR 127 highlighted in red

Route information
- Maintained by INDOT
- Length: 6.937 mi (11.164 km)
- Existed: 1931–present

Major junctions
- South end: US 20 in Angola
- North end: I-69 / I-80 Toll / I-90 Toll / SR 120 near Fremont

Location
- Country: United States
- State: Indiana
- Counties: Steuben

Highway system
- Indiana State Highway System; Interstate; US; State; Scenic
← SR 124	→ SR 128

State Road 127 (SR 127) is a short north–south highway in northeast corner of the U.S. state of Indiana between U.S. Route 20 (US 20) in Angola, Indiana and SR 120. Its present length was formerly a part of old US 27, whose designation was moved to the new Interstate 69 (I–69) when the freeway was completed in northern Indiana in 1967.

SR 127 is in fact a "child" of US 27; however, Indiana decommissioned all of US 27 north of Fort Wayne, so SR 127 no longer connects with US 27 anywhere. It functions in part to connect SR 120 to I–69 and, south of its interchange with I–69, it provides a local thoroughfare into Angola. The last several miles of SR 127 north of Angola's town square are crowded with fast-food franchises and other national chains.

SR 127 also provides access, through the very short SR 727, to Pokagon State Park.

== Route description ==
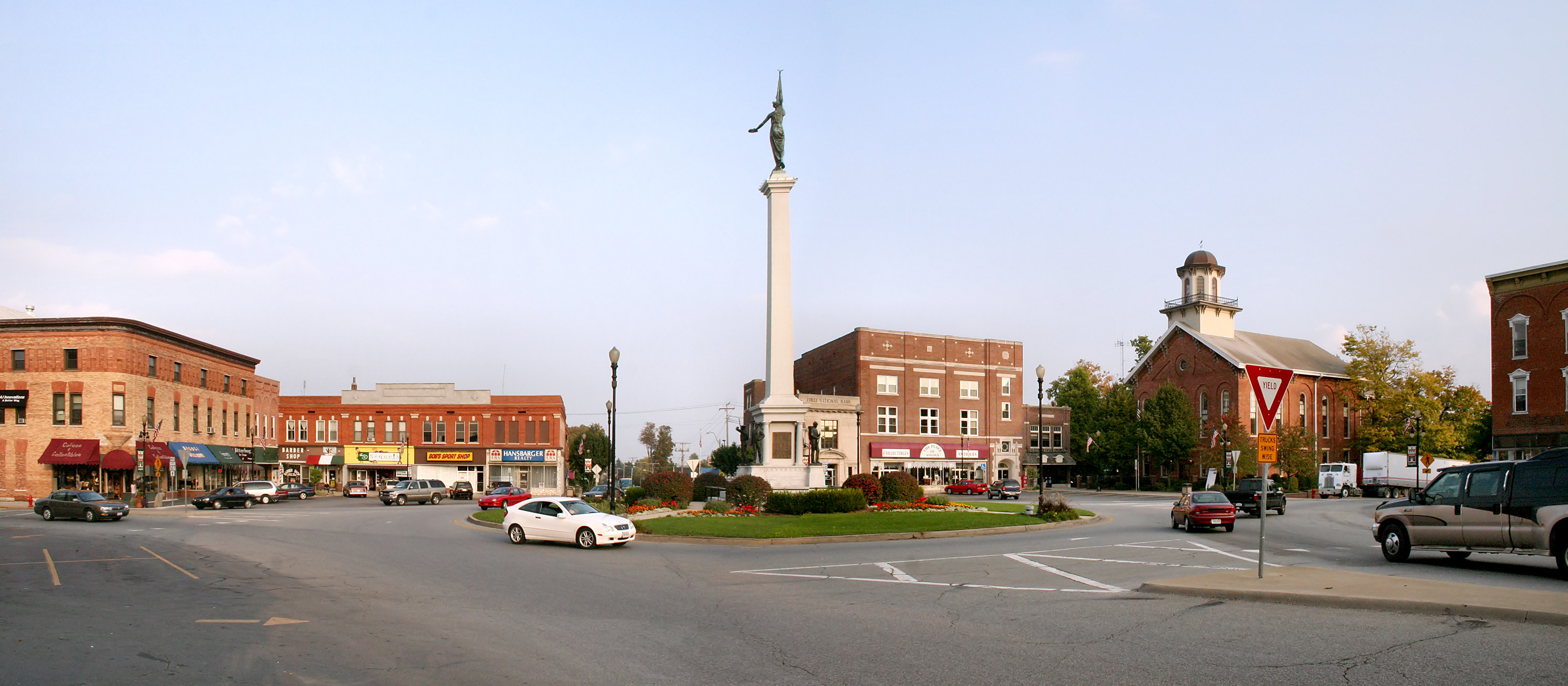
The traffic circle or roundabout at the intersection of US 20 and State Road 127 in Angola, looking east. SR 127 heads north (to the left) from this intersection.

SR 127 southern terminus is at US 20. SR 127 heads north as a two–lane highway passing through residential areas. At Calvary Lane in Angola the road becomes a four–lane highway with a center turn lane. At 200 North the road becomes a two–lane rural highway, passing farmland and woodlands. North of Angola, SR 127 has an interchange with Interstate 69 (I-69). Where SR 127 passes under I-69 heading west then at an intersection with SR 727, SR 127 turns north. After SR 727, SR 127 is within a few hundred yards from I-69.

== History ==
SR 127 was first authorized in 1931 between Pokagon State Park and US 27. Between late 1967 and early 1968 the road was extended north to SR 120, along the old route of US 27. In late 1968 or early 1969 the road was extended south to US 20 in Angola, along what had been US 27 before it was diverted to Interstate 69. The route from Pokagon State Park to SR 127 became SR 727 that this time.

== Major intersections ==
The entire route is in Steuben County.

Location	mi	km	Destinations	Notes
Angola	0.000	0.000	US 20	SR 127 begins
Angola	1.538	2.475	SR 827 north	Southern terminus of SR 827
Jamestown Township	4.983– 5.078	8.019– 8.172	I-69 – Fort Wayne, Lansing	Exit number 354 on I-69
Jamestown Township	5.212	8.388	SR 727 west – Pokagon State Park	Eastern terminus of SR 727
Jamestown Township	6.882– 6.937	11.076– 11.164	I-80 Toll / I-90 Toll / Indiana Toll Road — Chicago, Toledo; SR 120 – Fremont, Elkhart	Northern terminus of SR 127
1.000 mi = 1.609 km; 1.000 km = 0.621 mi
