= Clear Lake Township, Steuben County, Indiana =

Clear Lake Township
- Township
- Location in Steuben County
- Coordinates: 41°43′47″N 84°50′09″W
- Country: United States
- State: Indiana
- County: Steuben

Government
  - Type: Indiana township

Area
  - Total: 11.1 sq mi (29 km^{2})
  - Land: 9.56 sq mi (24.8 km^{2})
  - Water: 1.54 sq mi (4.0 km^{2}) 13.87%
- Elevation: 1,033 ft (315 m)

Population (2020)
  - Total: 818
  - Density: 83.6/sq mi (32.3/km^{2})
- Time zone: UTC-5 (Eastern (EST))
  - Summer (DST): UTC-4 (EDT)
- Area code: 260
- GNIS feature ID: 453223

Clear Lake Township is one of twelve townships in Steuben County, Indiana, United States. As of the 2020 census, its population was 818, up from 799 at 2010, and it contained 912 housing units. It is the north easternmost township in the state.

== History ==
William L. Lords House was listed on the National Register of Historic Places in 1983.

== Geography ==
According to the 2010 census, the township has a total area of 11.1 square miles (29 km^{2}), of which 9.56 square miles (24.8 km^{2}) (or 86.13%) is land and 1.54 square miles (4.0 km^{2}) (or 13.87%) is water. Lakes in this township include Clear Lake, Handy Lake, Lake Anne, Long Lake, Mirror Lake, Mud Lake, and Round Lake.

=== Cities and towns ===
- Clear Lake

=== Cemeteries ===
The township contains three cemeteries: Teeters, Clear Lake Baptist, and Clear Lake Lutheran.

=== Major highways ===
- Indiana State Road 120

== Education ==
Clear Lake Township residents may obtain a free library card from the Fremont Public Library.
