= Fremont Township, Steuben County, Indiana =

Fremont Township
- Township
- Location in Steuben County
- Coordinates: 41°44′02″N 84°55′03″W
- Country: United States
- State: Indiana
- County: Steuben

Government
  - Type: Indiana township

Area
  - Total: 23.15 sq mi (60.0 km^{2})
  - Land: 22.94 sq mi (59.4 km^{2})
  - Water: 0.21 sq mi (0.54 km^{2}) 0.91%
- Elevation: 1,070 ft (326 m)

Population (2020)
  - Total: 2,851
  - Density: 130.5/sq mi (50.4/km^{2})
- Time zone: UTC-5 (Eastern (EST))
  - Summer (DST): UTC-4 (EDT)
- ZIP code: 46737
- Area code: 260
- GNIS feature ID: 453317

Fremont Township is one of twelve townships in Steuben County, Indiana, United States. As of the 2020 census, its population was 2,851, down from 2,993 at the 2010 census, and it contained 1,211 housing units.

== Geography ==
According to the 2010 census, the township has a total area of 23.15 square miles (60.0 km^{2}), of which 22.94 square miles (59.4 km^{2}) (or 99.09%) is land and 0.21 square miles (0.54 km^{2}) (or 0.91%) is water. Lakes in this township include Eaton Lake, Fish Lake and Walters Lake.

=== Cities and towns ===
- Fremont

=== Cemeteries ===
The township contains four cemeteries: Bower, Coventer (also known as Ray Cemetery), Lakeside, and Fremont Cemetery (listed by the USGS as "The Old Cemetery").

=== Major highways ===
- Interstate 80
- Indiana State Road 120
- Indiana State Road 827

== Education ==
Fremont Township residents may obtain a free library card from the Fremont Public Library.
