= Erastus Farnham House =

United States historic place

Coordinates: 41°43′23″N 84°56′5.5″W

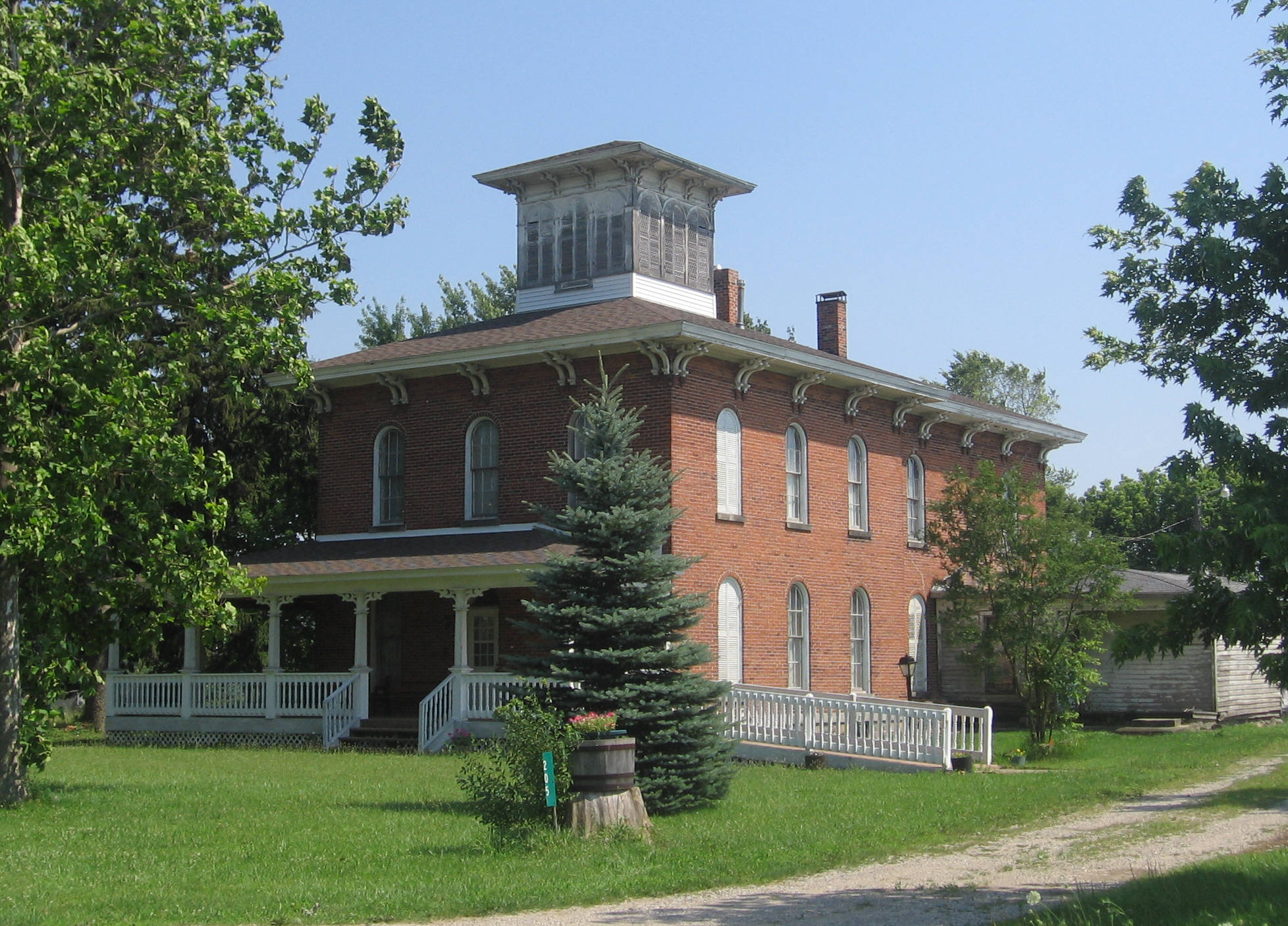
The Erastus Farnham House, just south of Fremont, Indiana, on State Road 827. Built c. 1849, it is reported to have been a stop on the Underground Railroad.

The Erastus Farnham House is located just south of Fremont, Indiana, on Indiana State Road 827 and was built in 1847–1849 by Erastus Farnham. A staunch abolitionist and one of the local Underground Railroad leaders, Farnham designed this home in part to be used as a stop on the Underground Railroad. The home still retains many of its nineteenth-century features including a cupola that served as a lookout point and an internal cistern, which allowed the owners to capture and store rainwater. "This extra water allowed the house to support additional guests when necessary without raising suspicion." The property was listed on the National Register of Historic Places in 2022.

Due to its location in northeast corner of Indiana, Fremont acted as a final stop in Indiana for many refugees traveling through Fort Wayne and Richmond. "The house is filled with stories and secrets but to this day retains its original charm and features."

From local historian Maurice McClew:

"My mother's father, Erastus Farnham, who was at one time county surveyor, was a pretty active member of the underground organization. He lived about two miles south of Fremont, near the Fremont and Angola road. . . My mother told me that the first negro she ever saw was a runaway slave who was brought to my grandfather's house and kept hidden until he could be taken on north at night.
"My grandfather had a brother named A. Farnham who lived on the Fremont and Angola road not far from my grandfather's place. He similarly kept runaway slaves and helped them to make their way to freedom."

== Notes ==
- Indiana Department of Natural Resources, "Underground Railroad Sites: Fremont ", accessed August 24, 2009.
- Sauer, Lee "Freedom Trail: The Underground Railroad ran through northeast Indiana, KPC News.net, accessed August 18, 2008.
- Michna-Bales, Jeanine, Through Darkness to Light: Photographs Along the Underground Railroad, Princeton Architectural Press, New York, USA, 2017.
