= William L. Lords House =

Historic house in Indiana, United States

- U.S. National Register of Historic Places
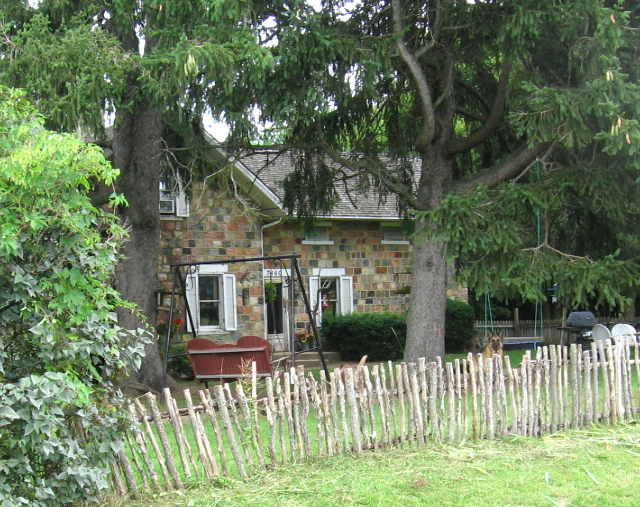
- William L. Lords House, August 2013

- Location within Indiana Location within the United States
- Location: Clear Lake Rd., northeast of Fremont in Clear Lake Township, Steuben County, Indiana
- Coordinates: 41°45′12″N 84°51′5″W
- Area: less than one acre
- Built: c. 1866
- NRHP reference No.: 83000114
- Added to NRHP: June 16, 1983

William L. Lords House, also known as the Stone House, is a historic home located in Clear Lake Township, Steuben County, Indiana. It was built about 1866, and is a 1 1/2-story, "T"plan, dwelling constructed of random laid cut fieldstone. The house is representative of "folk architecture."

It was listed on the National Register of Historic Places in 2002.
