= John J. Carson =

American politician

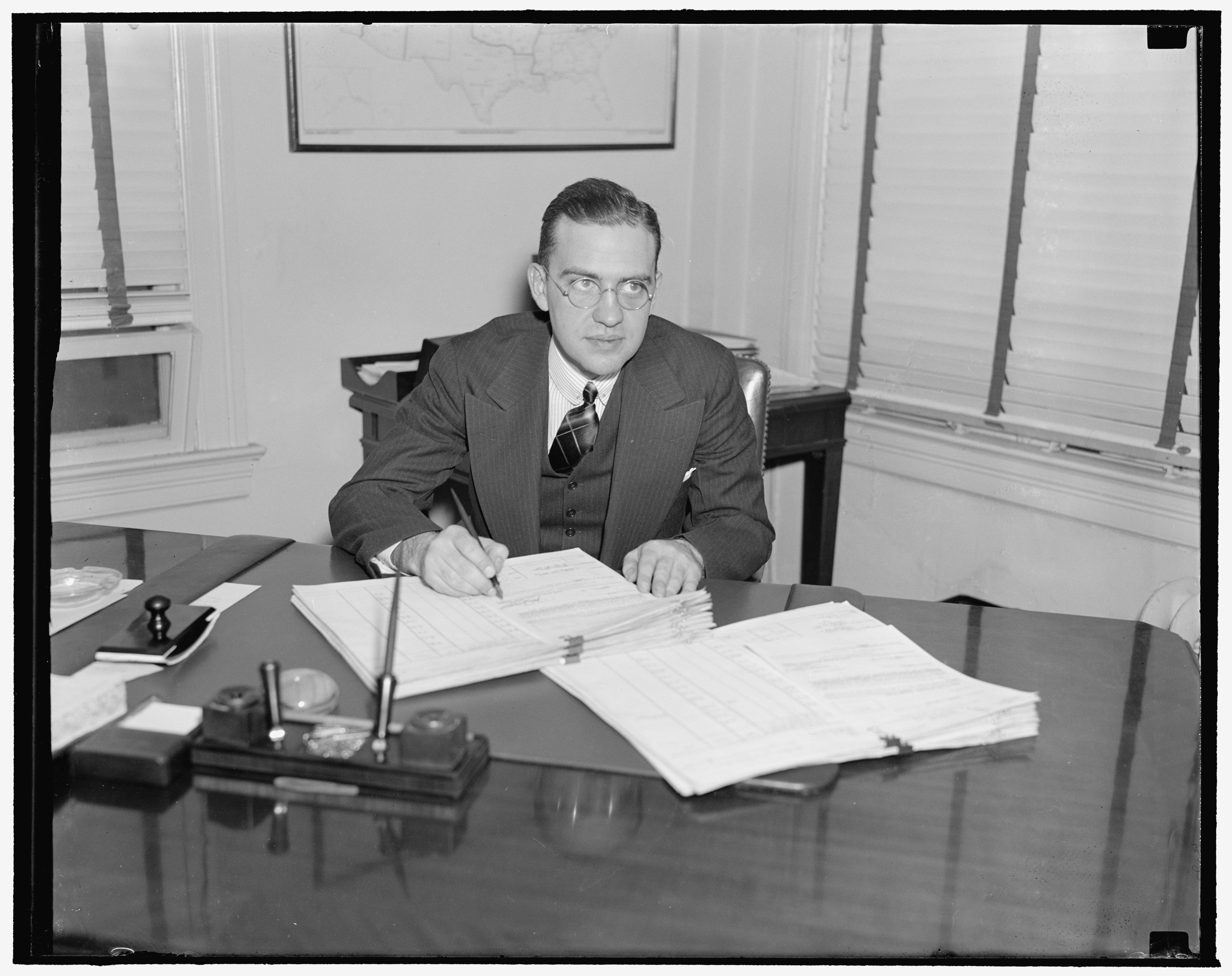

Commissioner of the Federal Trade Commission
- Former
- In office September 28, 1948 – March 31, 1953
- President: Harry S. Truman; Dwight D. Eisenhower

Personal details
- Born: Smith Valley, Indiana, U.S.
- Party: Republican

John J. Carson was a 20th-century American politician who served in the Truman Administration as a commissioner of the Federal Trade Commission (FTC) from 1949 to 1953. A Republican who was nominated to one of the party's posts on the FTC, he nevertheless drew ire from his own party owing to his past association with a group of business cooperatives.

== Background ==
Carson was born in Smith Valley, Indiana, an unincorporated community south of Indianapolis, where he grew up.

== Career ==
Carson's first job was as a messenger boy for the president of the American National Bank of Indianapolis. He then worked for the Van Camp Packing Company as bookkeeper and accountant. By 1912, he had gone into journalism and had become city editor in Indianapolis.

In 1918, Carson was assigned to work in Washington, D.C. as an assistant correspondent for the St. Louis Globe-Democrat newspaper. He moved shortly thereafter to the St. Louis Republic newspaper. He then moved to the Baltimore Sun, where he came to know H. L. Mencken, and then the Scripps-Howard Evening Sun through 1922.

Although Carson was a Republican, he faced allegations of socialism from Republican Senators such as John W. Bricker due to his past association with a group of business cooperatives. Carson maintained that his support for cooperatives was not rooted in socialism, but rather in the ideals expressed in the quadragesimo anno, an encyclical issued by Pope Pius XI that condemned unregulated capitalism. As a member of the FTC, his term overlapped closely with that of Stephen J. Spingarn.

== See also ==
- List of former FTC commissioners
- Stephen J. Spingarn
- Harry S. Truman
