= Enos Michael House =

Historic house in Indiana, United States

- U.S. National Register of Historic Places
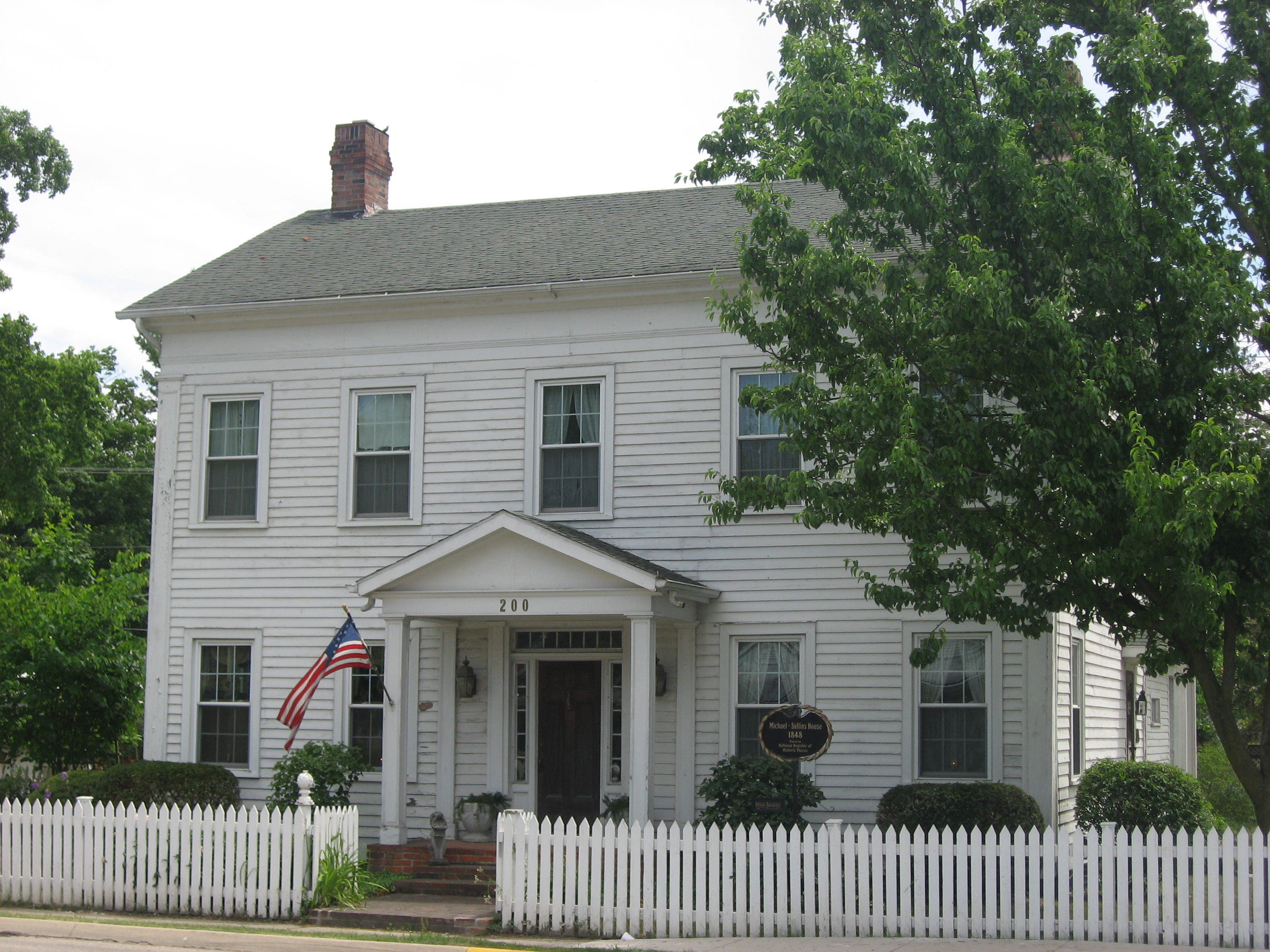
- Enos Michael House, May 2012

- Location within Indiana Location within the United States
- Location: 200 E. Toledo St., Fremont, Indiana
- Coordinates: 41°43′50″N 84°55′53″W
- Area: less than one acre
- Built: 1848, 1920
- Architectural style: Greek Revival
- NRHP reference No.: 82000075
- Added to NRHP: February 19, 1982

Enos Michael House, also known as the Michael-Sullins House, is a historic home located in Fremont, Indiana. It was built in 1848, and is a 2 1/2-story, rectangular, five bay, Greek Revival style frame dwelling. It sits on a cut stone foundation and has a side gable roof. A rear addition was built about 1920. It features a recently added one-bay, central entrance portico.

It was listed on the National Register of Historic Places in 1982.
