= Indiana State Road 120 =

Highway in Indiana

State Road 120
- SR 120 highlighted in red

Route information
- Maintained by INDOT
- Length: 60.093 mi (96.710 km)
- Existed: 1937–present

Major junctions
- West end: Jackson Boulevard. and Middleton Run Road in Elkhart
- SR 15 in Bristol; SR 13 in York Township; SR 5 in Van Buren Township; SR 9 in Howe; SR 3 in Greenfield Township; SR 327 in Orland; SR 127 in Jamestown Township; I-80 / I-90 / Indiana Toll Road in Jamestown Township; SR 827 in Fremont
- East end: Michigan state line east of Fremont

Location
- Country: United States
- State: Indiana
- Counties: Elkhart, LaGrange, Steuben

Highway system
- Indiana State Highway System; Interstate; US; State; Scenic
← SR 119	→ SR 121

State Road 120 (SR 120) is a state road in the northeastern section of the state of Indiana. Running for about 60 miles (97 km) in a general east–west direction, connecting rural portions of Elkhart, LaGrange and Steuben counties. The western terminus is a junction with Jackson Boulevard and Middleton Run Road in Elkhart. The eastern terminus is at the Indiana–Michigan border, east of Fremont.

The modern route of SR 120 was originally just small part of a much longer Native American trail. In the early 1920s a project to construct a road replacing the Native American trail took place. SR 120 was introduced in 1937 routed along its current routing, as a state road number for Vistula Road, which was falling apart. The western end of SR 120 has been moved a couple of different times within the city of Elkhart.

== Route description ==
SR 120 begins in Elkhart at the intersection of Middleton Run Road and Jackson Boulevard. It follows Jackson Boulevard, northeasterly paralleling the St. Joseph River and the Grand Elk Railroad. The road leaves the city of Elkhart and enters Elkhart County before entering the town of Bristol. In Bristol the road runs along Vistula Street and has a short concurrency with SR 15. As SR 120 leaves Bristol it crosses over the Grand Elk Railroad. East of Bristol SR 120 curves and becomes an east–west roadway, passing through rural Elkhart and LaGrange Counties, having intersections with SR 13 and SR 5. In LaGrange county the road enters the town of Howe, passing through an intersection with SR 9. After the SR 9 intersection SR 120 is concurrent with Defiance Street, until SR 120 turns south onto 3rd Street, before turning east again on Wayne Street.

East of Howe SR 120 passes north of Ontario and through an intersection with the northern end of SR 3 near Brighton. Then, upon entering Steuben County, SR 120 enters the town of Orland on Toledo Street, before having a four-way stop with SR 327. After SR 327, SR 120 leaves Orland heading northeasterly before turning easterly again, closely paralleling the Indiana Toll Road. SR 120 passes through an intersection with the northern end of SR 127, before crossing over Interstate 69. After Interstate 69, SR 120 has an entrance to the Indiana Toll Road and then passes under the toll road. SR 120 enters the town of Fremont, running along Toledo Street, having an all-way stop with the northern end of SR 827 (Wayne Street). After Fremont SR 120 passes near Clear Lake, as the road turns towards the southeast. Before the Indiana-Michigan state line SR 120 has an intersection with the former northern end of SR 1. At the Indiana-Michigan border SR 120 becomes Territorial Road, a county road in Hillsdale County, Michigan; this roadway was formerly M-120 which connected to OH-120.

== History ==
The first path along part of the modern SR 120 roadway was the Vistula Trail, an old Native American trail, between Fort Duquesne and Green Bay via South Bend and the south shore of Lake Michigan. In 1922 Vistula Road was built at a cost of $87,500, equivalent to US$1,683,026.84 in 2025. During 1930 SR 19 was proposed and accepted as a state road along modern SR 120 from Elkhart to Bristol. The second state road proposed along modern SR 120 was SR 827 from Fremont east to the Michigan/Indiana border in 1934. The right-of-way for SR 827, east of Fremont, was purchased in 1935. The following year Steuben County was having trouble maintaining the roadway, with bridges needing replacement and the gravel road surface was deteriorating. The state highway commission accepted Vistula Road as a state road in 1937 and it becomes part of SR 120. In late 1938 or early 1939 two parts of SR 120 opens to traffic with the first being between SR 13 and SR 3 and the second being throughout Steuben County. By 1941 SR 120 went between Elkhart and the Michigan state line, east of Fremont, uninterrupted. The entire roadway was paved by 1965. In late 1969 or early 1970 SR 120s western end was moved from an intersection between Middleton Run Road and US 20 (now Old US 20/Toledo Road) to an intersection between Goshen Avenue and Jackson Boulevard. The western end of SR 120 was moved once again to an intersection between Jackson Boulevard and Middleton Run Road on September 9, 2000.

At one time, State Road 120 was to have been rerouted onto Elkhart County Road 17 to end at U.S. 20.

== Major intersections ==
County	Location	mi	km	Destinations	Notes
Elkhart	Elkhart	0.000	0.000	Jackson Boulevard; Middleton Run Road	Western terminus of SR 120
Elkhart	Concord–Washington township line	1.683	2.709	CR 17 to Indiana Toll Road	
Elkhart	Bristol	5.640	9.077	SR 15 south	Western end of SR 15 concurrency
Elkhart	Bristol	5.866	9.440	SR 15 north to I-80 Toll / I-90 Toll	Eastern end of SR 15 concurrency
Elkhart	York Township	12.598	20.275	SR 13 to Indiana Toll Road – Middlebury, Constantine	
LaGrange	Van Buren Township	17.864	28.749	SR 5 south – Shipshewana	Northern terminus of SR 5
LaGrange	Howe	26.192	42.152	SR 9 to Indiana Toll Road – LaGrange, Sturgis	
LaGrange	Greenfield Township	32.280	51.950	SR 3 south – Mongo, Kendallville	Northern terminus of SR 3
Steuben	Orland	39.793	64.041	SR 327	
Steuben	Jamestown Township	49.429	79.548	SR 127 south to I-69 – Angola	Northern terminus of SR 127
Steuben	Jamestown Township	49.583	79.796	I-80 Toll / I-90 Toll / Indiana Toll Road — Chicago, Toledo	Exit number 144 on I-80/I-90/Ind. Toll Road
Steuben	Fremont	52.991	85.281	SR 827 south	Northern terminus of SR 827
Steuben	Fremont Township	60.093	96.710	Territorial Road	Eastern terminus of SR 120 at Michigan State line
1.000 mi = 1.609 km; 1.000 km = 0.621 mi: Concurrency terminus; Tolled
