= Smith Valley, Indiana =

- Unincorporated community
- Location within Indiana Location within the United States
- Coordinates: 39°36′19″N 86°11′49″W
- Country: United States
- State: Indiana
- County: Johnson
- Township: White River
- Elevation: 696 ft (212 m)
- ZIP code: 46142
- FIPS code: 18-70290
- GNIS feature ID: 449732

Smith Valley is an unincorporated community in White River Township, Johnson County, Indiana.

== History ==
Smith Valley was named for William K. Smith, a pioneer settler. A post office was established at Smith Valley in 1870, and remained in operation until it was discontinued in 1902.

== Notable people ==
John J. Carson, member of the Federal Trade Commission (FTC) from 1948 to 1953; born in Smith Valley.
