= Clear Lake, Indiana =

- Town
- Location of Clear Lake in Steuben County, Indiana.
- Coordinates: 41°44′40″N 84°50′16″W
- Country: United States
- State: Indiana
- County: Steuben
- Township: Clear Lake
- Incorporated: 1933

Area
  - Total: 2.46 sq mi (6.38 km^{2})
  - Land: 1.11 sq mi (2.88 km^{2})
  - Water: 1.35 sq mi (3.50 km^{2})
- Elevation: 1,037 ft (316 m)

Population (2020)
  - Total: 354
  - Density: 318.2/sq mi (122.84/km^{2})
- Time zone: UTC-5 (EST)
  - Summer (DST): UTC-5 (EST)
- ZIP code: 46737
- Area code: 260
- FIPS code: 18-13438
- GNIS feature ID: 2396653
- Website: http://www.townofclearlake.org

Clear Lake is a town located in the northeast corner of Steuben County, Indiana, in Clear Lake Township. As such, it is the northeasternmost community in the state of Indiana. The population was 354 at the 2020 census.

== History ==
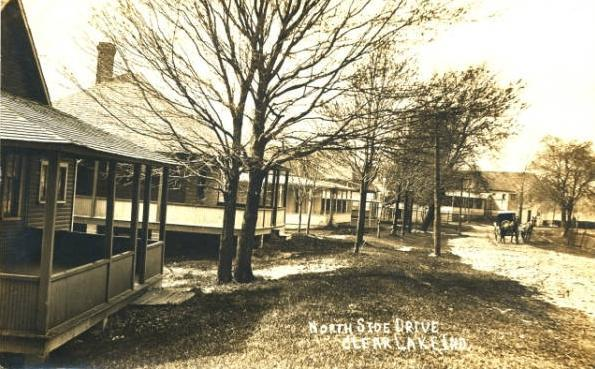
The north shore drive of Clear Lake, Indiana in 1910

A post office was established at Clear Lake in 1870, and remained in operation until it was discontinued in 1903. Clear Lake was incorporated as a town in 1933.

== Geography ==
According to the 2010 census, Clear Lake has a total area of 2.38 square miles (6.16 km^{2}), of which 1.04 square miles (2.69 km^{2}) (or 43.7%) is land and 1.34 square miles (3.47 km^{2}) (or 56.3%) is water.

== Demographics ==
Historical population
Census	Pop.	Note	%±
1940	65		—
1950	151		132.3%
1960	147		−2.6%
1970	271		84.4%
1980	301		11.1%
1990	272		−9.6%
2000	244		−10.3%
2010	339		38.9%
2020	354		4.4%
U.S. Decennial Census

=== 2010 census ===
As of the census of 2010, there were 339 people, 169 households, and 115 families living in the town. The population density was 326.0 inhabitants per square mile (125.9/km^{2}). There were 614 housing units at an average density of 590.4 per square mile (228.0/km^{2}). The racial makeup of the town was 98.8% White, 0.9% Asian, and 0.3% from two or more races. Hispanic or Latino of any race were 0.6% of the population.

There were 169 households, of which 9.5% had children under the age of 18 living with them, 65.7% were married couples living together, 0.6% had a female householder with no husband present, 1.8% had a male householder with no wife present, and 32.0% were non-families. 28.4% of all households were made up of individuals, and 18.4% had someone living alone who was 65 years of age or older. The average household size was 2.01 and the average family size was 2.43.

The median age in the town was 58.9 years. 9.1% of residents were under the age of 18; 3.8% were between the ages of 18 and 24; 11.7% were from 25 to 44; 38.6% were from 45 to 64; and 36.6% were 65 years of age or older. The gender makeup of the town was 51.3% male and 48.7% female.

=== 2000 census ===
As of the census of 2000, there were 244 people, 113 households, and 87 families living in the town. The population density was 233.4 inhabitants per square mile (90.1/km^{2}). There were 506 housing units at an average density of 484.1 per square mile (186.9/km^{2}). The racial makeup of the town was 98.77% White, 0.41% Asian, and 0.82% from two or more races.

There were 113 households, out of which 23.9% had children under the age of 18 living with them, 67.3% were married couples living together, 8.0% had a female householder with no husband present, and 23.0% were non-families. 22.1% of all households were made up of individuals, and 11.5% had someone living alone who was 65 years of age or older. The average household size was 2.16 and the average family size was 2.47.

In the town, the population was spread out, with 17.2% under the age of 18, 3.3% from 18 to 24, 19.3% from 25 to 44, 37.7% from 45 to 64, and 22.5% who were 65 years of age or older. The median age was 50 years. For every 100 females, there were 103.3 males. For every 100 females age 18 and over, there were 98.0 males.

The median income for a household in the town was $49,250, and the median income for a family was $50,096. Males had a median income of $30,417 versus $27,125 for females. The per capita income for the town was $23,092. About 4.2% of families and 4.4% of the population were below the poverty line, including none of those under the age of eighteen and 6.9% of those 65 or over.
