= Indiana State Road 827 =

State highway in Steuben County, Indiana, United States

State Road 827
- SR 827 highlighted in red

Route information
- Maintained by INDOT
- Length: 6.630 mi (10.670 km)
- Existed: 1934–present

Major junctions
- South end: SR 127 in Angola
- North end: SR 120 in Fremont

Location
- Country: United States
- State: Indiana
- Counties: Steuben

Highway system
- Indiana State Highway System; Interstate; US; State; Scenic
← SR 727	→ SR 912

State Road 827 (SR 827) is a northeast–southwest State Road located in Steuben County, Indiana, United States, in the northeastern part of the state. The highway runs from the City of Angola northeast to SR 120 in Fremont. The highway was formed in the 1930s, as an alternative for traffic between Toledo, Ohio and Angola. A section of roadway was authorized as SR 827, but later became part of SR 120. A small realignment project was completed in Angola during the 2000s.

== Route description ==
SR 827 starts in Angola at the corner of Wayne Street (SR 127) and Harcourt Road. It follows Harcourt Road east-southeasterly, over Indiana Northeastern Railroad track, until it reaches Williams Street. The highway follows Williams Street northeasterly until it leaves the City of Angola, where the Williams Street name ends. SR 827 roughly parallels the Indiana Northeastern Railroad on its way to Fremont. South of Fremont the state road passes below the Indiana Toll Road. SR 827 enters Fremont traveling on Wayne Street, crossing back over the Indiana Northeastern Railroad track. The state highway designation for SR 827 terminates at an intersection with Toledo Street (SR 120) where Wayne Street continues north, towards Michigan.

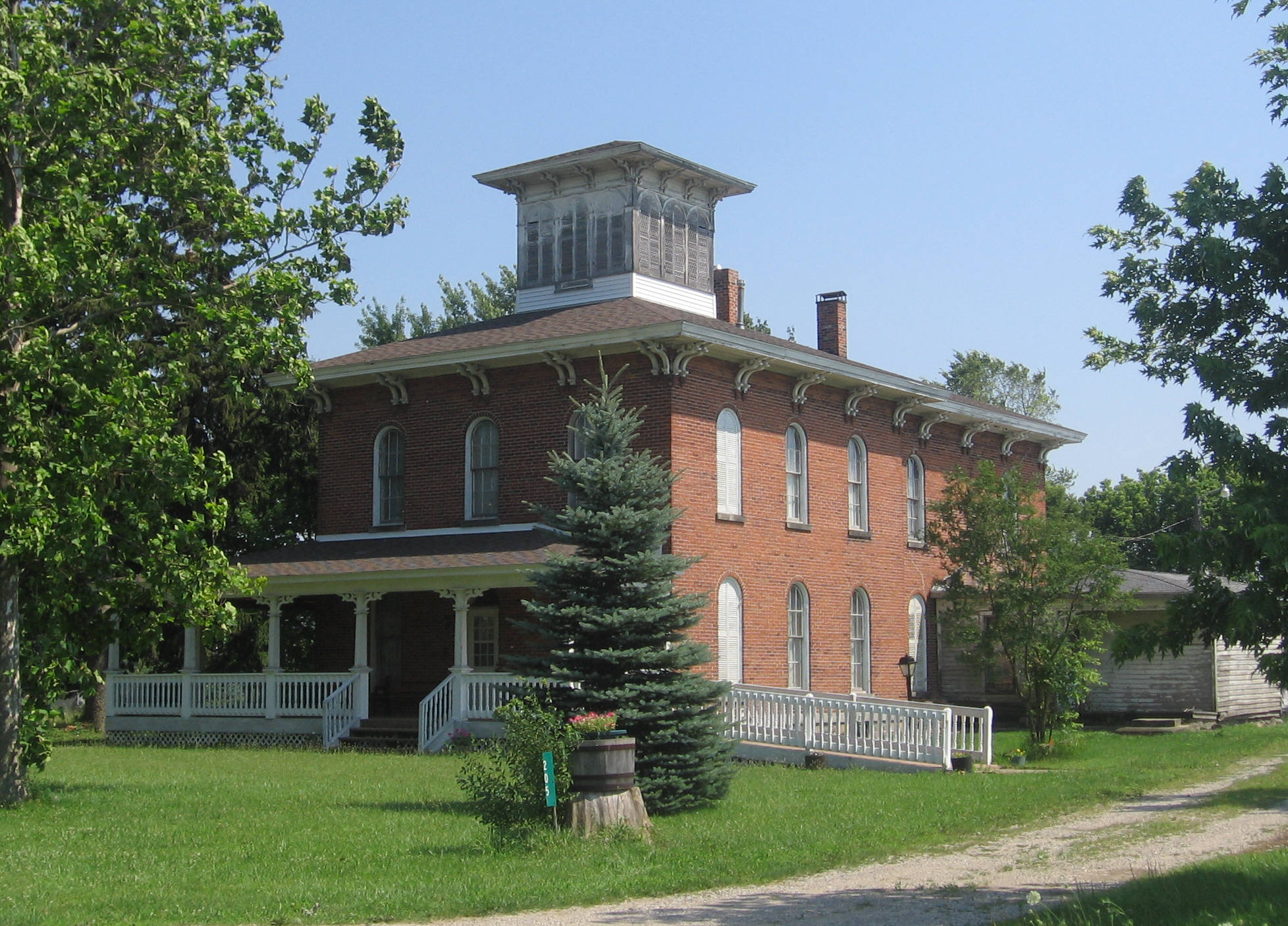
The Erastus Farnham House, just south of Fremont, Indiana, on State Road 827. Built c. 1849, it is reported to have been a stop on the Underground Railroad.

== History ==
The Indiana State Highway Commission proposed a state road following modern SR 827 in 1932, continuing north to Michigan east of Ray. SR 827 was commissioned in 1934 between Angola and Fremont. At this time SR 827 was authorized between Fremont and Michigan State Line, east of Fremont. In the same year the Tri-State Scenic Highway was founded, running between Toledo, Ohio and Angola via of Fremont. The Tri-State Scenic Highway was planned to relieve traffic on US 20 and in the state of Indiana it became part of the state road system as SR 827. Steuben County had purchased most right of way needed for the Tri-State Scenic Highway by mid-1935. When all right of way was secured the Indiana State Highway Commission was to take control of the Tri-State Scenic Highway. The state highway commission built the section of road east of Fremont in 1936. During 1939 the section of road that was authorized as SR 827, between Fremont and Michigan, became part of SR 120 as it was commissioned between Bristol and Michigan. The entire route of SR 827 was paved by 1962. In Angola, it was diverted over a recently completed bridge in 2005 so that it intersects SR 127 just north of Angola.

== Major intersections ==
The entire route is in Steuben County.

Location	mi	km	Destinations	Notes
Angola	0.000	0.000	SR 127	Southern terminus of SR 827
Fremont	6.630	10.670	SR 120	Northern terminus SR 827
1.000 mi = 1.609 km; 1.000 km = 0.621 mi

== See also ==
- List of state roads in Indiana
- List of highways numbered 827
