= Fremont, Indiana =

- Town
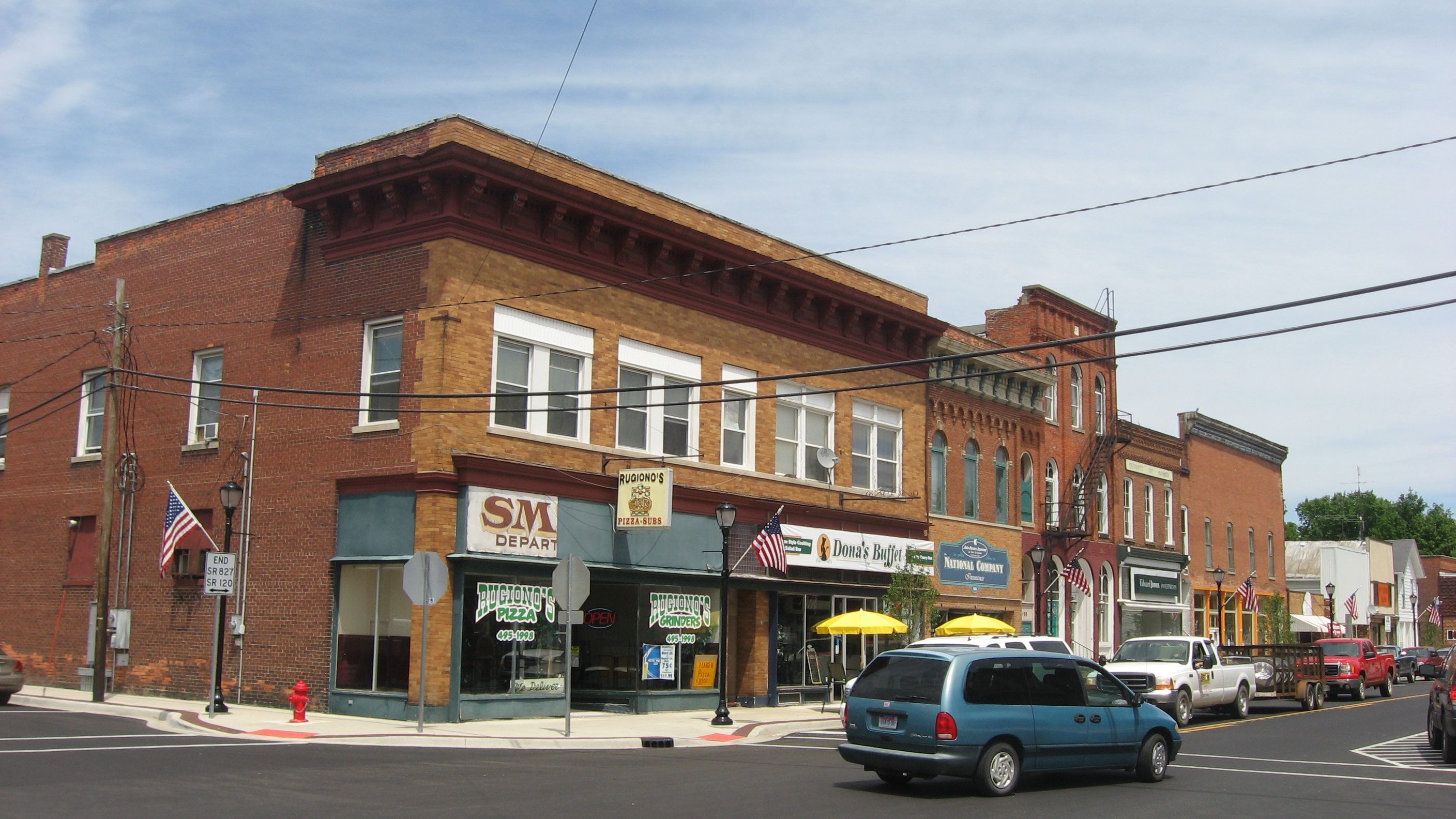
- Downtown Fremont
- Motto: "A Place To Go home To"
- Location of Fremont in Steuben County, Indiana.
- Coordinates: 41°43′41″N 84°56′23″W
- Country: United States
- State: Indiana
- County: Steuben
- Township: Fremont
- Platted: 1837
- Incorporated: 1867

Area
  - Total: 3.12 sq mi (8.08 km^{2})
  - Land: 3.11 sq mi (8.05 km^{2})
  - Water: 0.015 sq mi (0.04 km^{2})
- Elevation: 1,053 ft (321 m)

Population (2020)
  - Total: 2,034
  - Density: 654/sq mi (252.7/km^{2})
- Time zone: UTC-5 (EST)
  - Summer (DST): UTC-4 (EDT)
- ZIP code: 46737
- Area code: 260
- FIPS code: 18-25882
- GNIS feature ID: 2396951
- Website: www.townoffremont.org

Fremont is a town in Fremont Township, Steuben County, in the U.S. state of Indiana. The population was 2,034 at the 2020 census.

== History ==
Fremont was first settled in 1834 under the name Willow Prairie. It became the Village of Brockville when it was platted in 1837. In 1848, it was renamed to honor John C. Frémont, "the Great Pathfinder", in part because there was already a Brockville in Indiana.

A post office was established under the name Brockville in 1837, and was renamed to Fremont in 1848. The post office is currently in operation.

The town of Fremont was officially incorporated in 1867.

In 1914, the first hospital in Steuben County was opened in Fremont by Dr. Wade.

== Geography ==
Fremont is located four miles east of the interchange between Interstate 69 and the Indiana Toll Road (Interstate 80/90) on State Road 120.

According to the 2010 census, Fremont has a total area of 2.22 square miles (5.75 km^{2}), of which 2.21 square miles (5.72 km^{2}) (or 99.55%) is land and 0.01 square miles (0.03 km^{2}) (or 0.45%) is water.

As an oddity, someone traveling due east from Fremont crosses into Michigan—not into Ohio. This is due to the early 19th century Ohio-Michigan boundary dispute over Toledo (q.v. Toledo War for details).

== Demographics ==
Historical population
Census	Pop.	Note	%±
1870	392		—
1880	632		61.2%
1890	672		6.3%
1900	709		5.5%
1910	694		−2.1%
1920	729		5.0%
1930	802		10.0%
1940	855		6.6%
1950	947		10.8%
1960	937		−1.1%
1970	1,043		11.3%
1980	1,180		13.1%
1990	1,407		19.2%
2000	1,696		20.5%
2010	2,138		26.1%
2020	2,034		−4.9%
U.S. Decennial Census

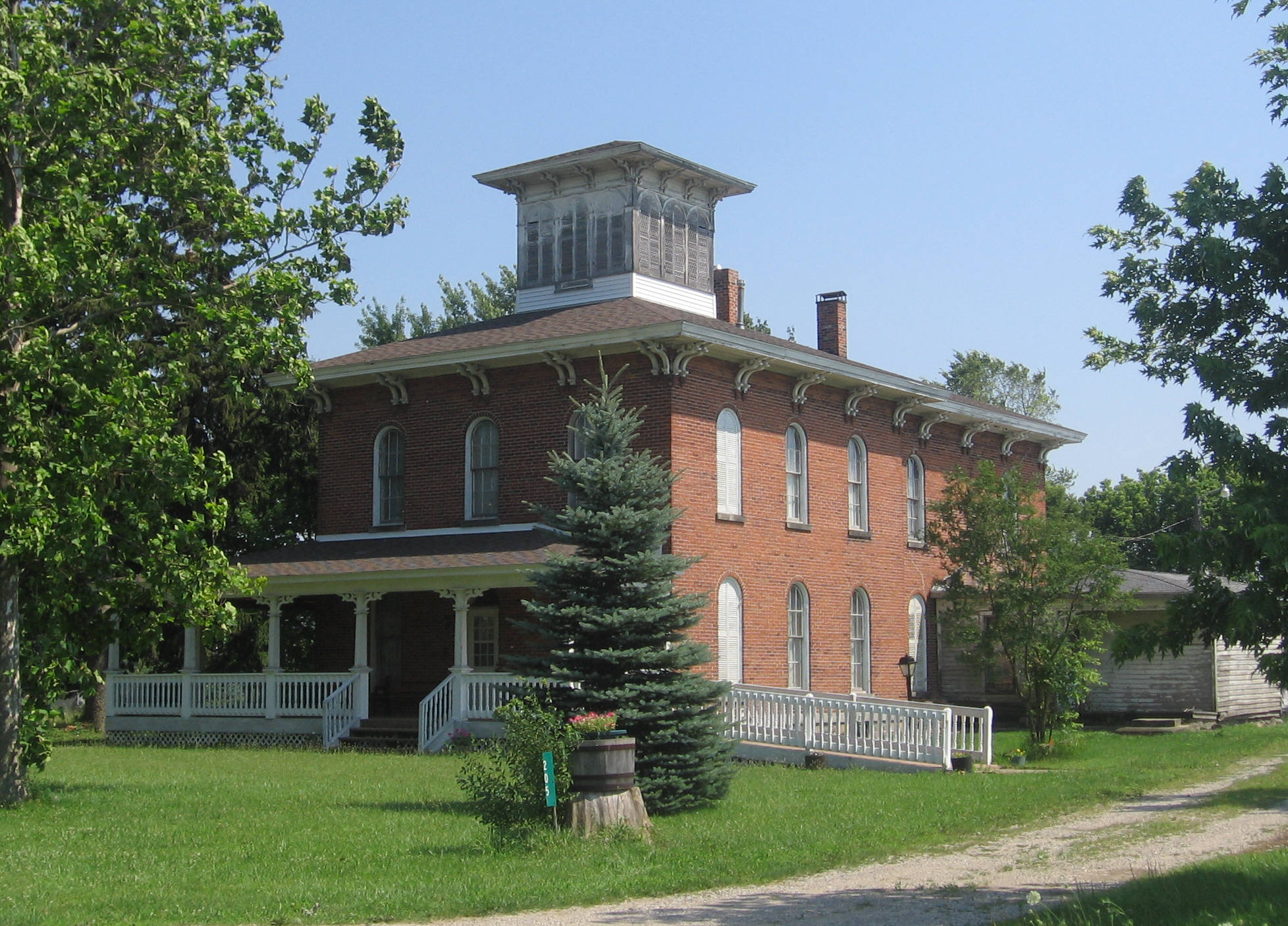
The Erastus Farnham House, just south of Fremont, on State Road 827. Built c. 1849, it is reported to have been a stop on the Underground Railroad.

=== 2020 census ===
As of the 2020 census, Fremont had a population of 2,034. The median age was 37.2 years. 25.2% of residents were under the age of 18 and 16.2% of residents were 65 years of age or older. For every 100 females there were 91.9 males, and for every 100 females age 18 and over there were 89.5 males age 18 and over.

0.0% of residents lived in urban areas, while 100.0% lived in rural areas.

There were 839 households in Fremont, of which 34.2% had children under the age of 18 living in them. Of all households, 41.1% were married-couple households, 17.8% were households with a male householder and no spouse or partner present, and 29.3% were households with a female householder and no spouse or partner present. About 28.4% of all households were made up of individuals and 14.4% had someone living alone who was 65 years of age or older.

There were 878 housing units, of which 4.4% were vacant. The homeowner vacancy rate was 1.2% and the rental vacancy rate was 8.9%.

Racial composition as of the 2020 census
Race	Number	Percent
White	1,926	94.7%
Black or African American	7	0.3%
American Indian and Alaska Native	1	0.0%
Asian	10	0.5%
Native Hawaiian and Other Pacific Islander	0	0.0%
Some other race	14	0.7%
Two or more races	76	3.7%
Hispanic or Latino (of any race)	54	2.7%

=== 2010 census ===
As of the census of 2010, there were 2,138 people, 815 households, and 561 families living in the town. The population density was 963.1 inhabitants per square mile (371.9/km^{2}). There were 878 housing units at an average density of 395.5 per square mile (152.7/km^{2}). The racial makeup of the town was 98.6% White, 0.2% African American, 0.2% Native American, 0.3% Asian, 0.4% from other races, and 0.3% from two or more races. Hispanic or Latino of any race were 1.8% of the population.

There were 815 households, of which 40.4% had children under the age of 18 living with them, 46.1% were married couples living together, 15.3% had a female householder with no husband present, 7.4% had a male householder with no wife present, and 31.2% were non-families. 23.9% of all households were made up of individuals, and 9.5% had someone living alone who was 65 years of age or older. The average household size was 2.62 and the average family size was 3.08.

The median age in the town was 33.1 years. 29.1% of residents were under the age of 18; 9.8% were between the ages of 18 and 24; 28.8% were from 25 to 44; 21.9% were from 45 to 64; and 10.5% were 65 years of age or older. The gender makeup of the town was 48.4% male and 51.6% female.

=== 2000 census ===
As of the census of 2000, there were 1,696 people, 640 households, and 455 families living in the town. The population density was 761.9 inhabitants per square mile (294.2/km^{2}). There were 679 housing units at an average density of 305.0 per square mile (117.8/km^{2}). The racial makeup of the town was 98.11% White, 0.18% African American, 0.29% Native American, 0.06% Asian, 0.47% from other races, and 0.88% from two or more races. Hispanic or Latino of any race were 1.95% of the population.

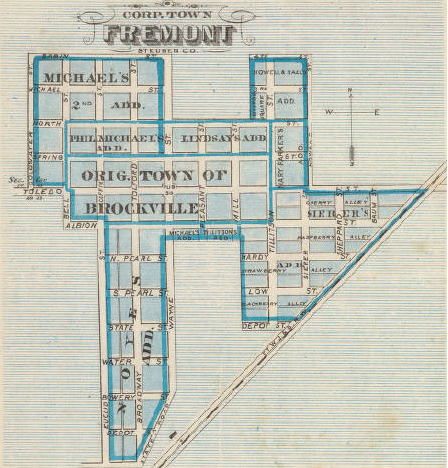
Fremont, Indiana from 1876 Atlas

There were 64 households, out of which 4.34% had children under the age of 18 living with them, 508% were married couples living together, 15.2% had a female householder with no husband present, and 2.89% were non-families. 26.1% of all households were made up of individuals, and 11.7% had someone living alone who was 65 years of age or older. The average household size was 2.65 and the average family size was 3.18.

In the town, the population was spread out, with 33.1% under the age of 18, 8.1% from 18 to 24, 29.7% from 25 to 44, 18.3% from 45 to 64, and 10.8% who were 65 years of age or older. The median age was 32 years. For every 100 females, there were 83.0 males. For every 100 females age 18 and over, there were 80.4 males.

The median income for a household in the town was $38,462, and the median income for a family was $42,446. Males had a median income of $31,333 versus $22,260 for females. The per capita income for the town was $16,067. About 5.7% of families and 7.3% of the population were below the poverty line, including 6.6% of those under age 18 and 10.1% of those age 65 or over.

== Sites of interest ==
The following are National Register of Historic Places sites in or near Fremont:

- The Enos Michael House, 200 E. Toledo St, built c. 1850.
- The William L. Lords House, Clear Lake Rd., built c. 1848.
- Pokagon State Park, four miles west of Fremont, is known for recreational activities such as swimming in Lake James, camping and tobogganing in the winter months. In addition to the park itself, the Combination Shelter (known locally as the CCC Shelter) at the park is also on the Register.

Fremont and the surrounding area enjoys several facilities and activities throughout the year:

- Fremont hosts its annual Music Fest each July, which features a parade, live music, games and vendors.
- City Park hosts a farmers' market on Saturday mornings during the summer months.
- Pokagon State Park sponsors a deer hunt in the autumn of most years to help control the population.
- Vistula Park is home to Fremont's little league baseball and softball diamonds. It also has basketball hoops, a pavilion and over a mile of paved walking trails in its woods.

== Education ==
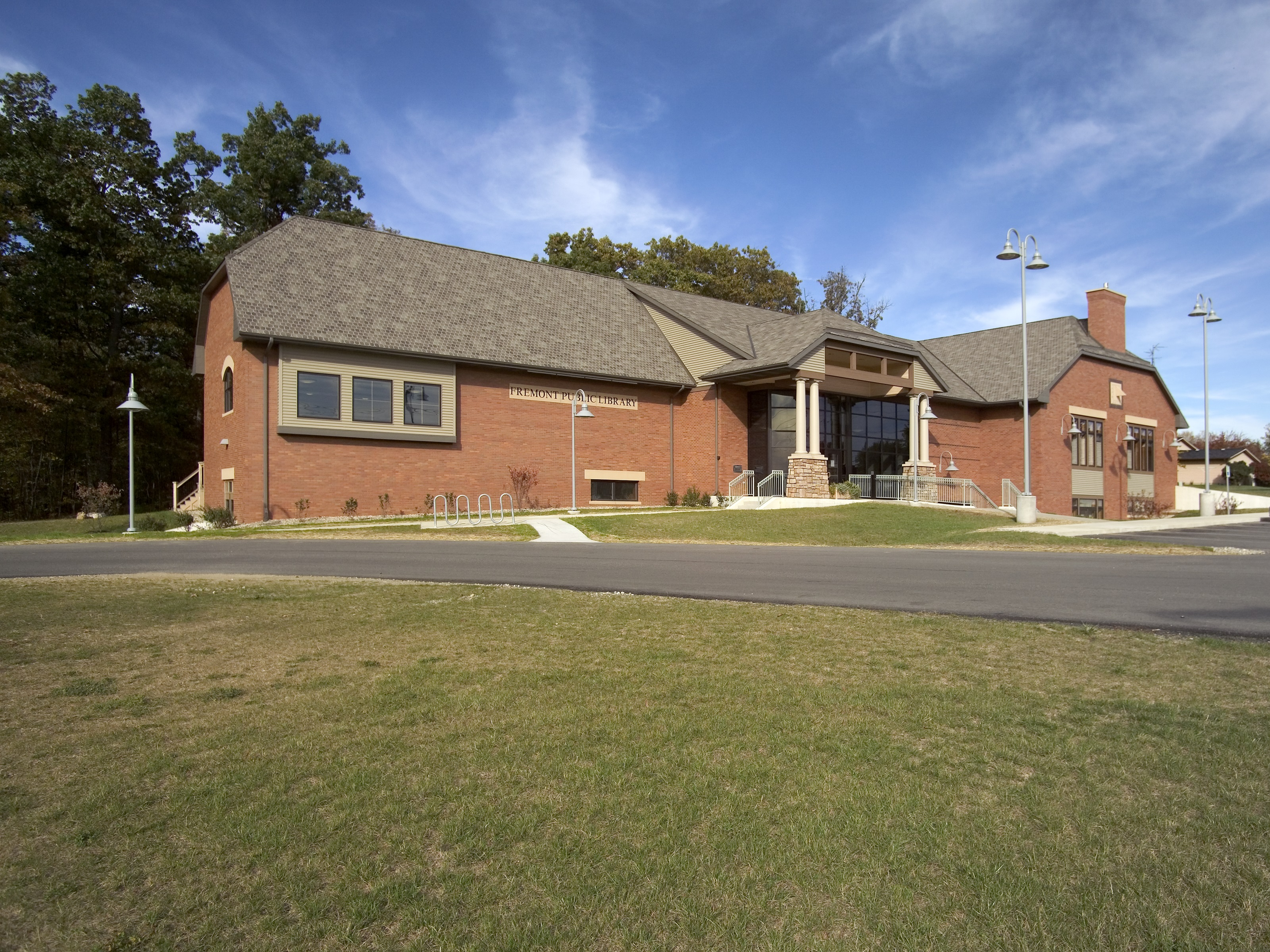
The Fremont Public Library

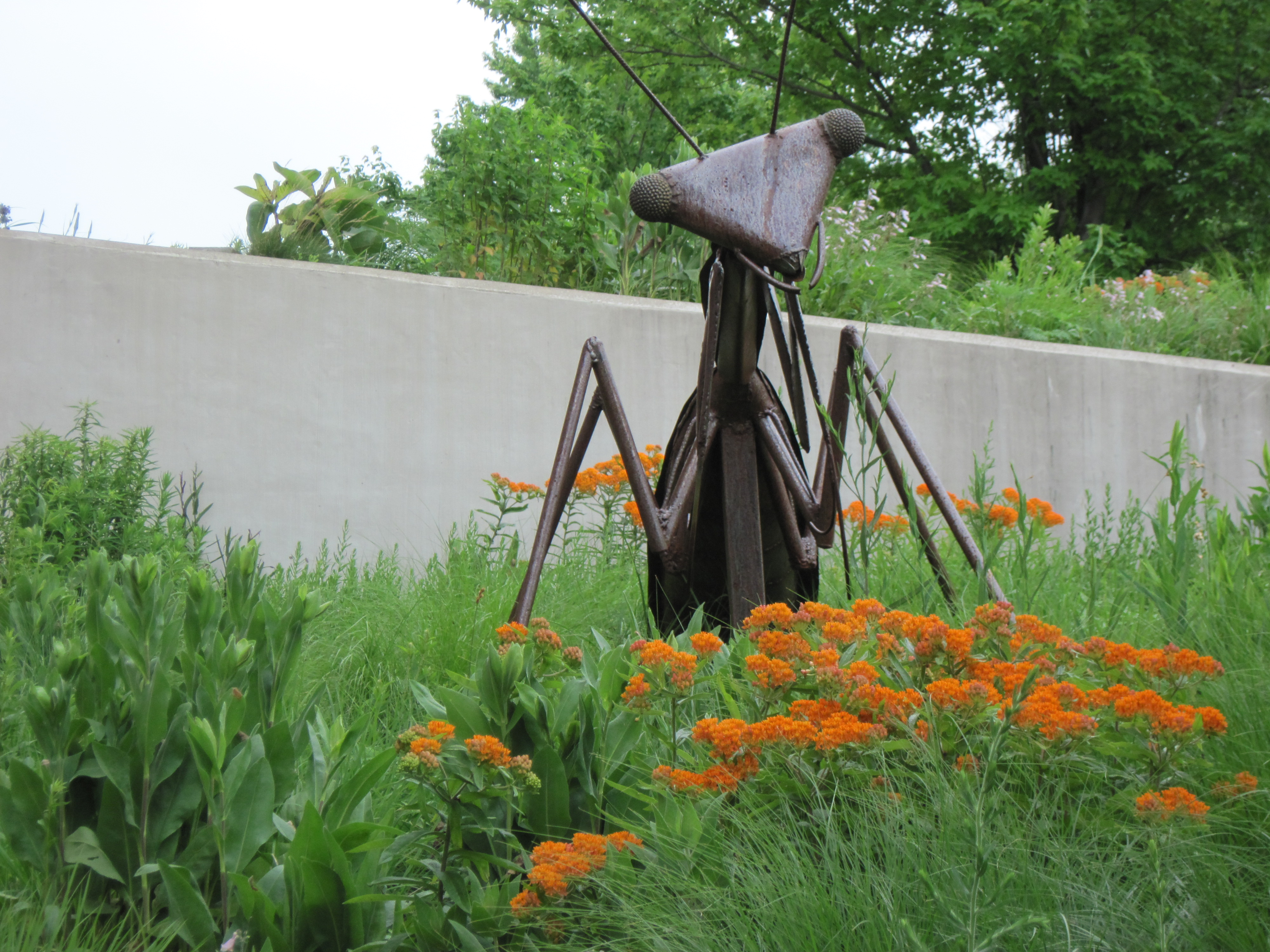
One of several sculptures created by local artists and installed at the Fremont Public Library.

Fremont Community Schools oversees three schools in its district: Fremont High School, Fremont Middle School and Fremont Elementary School. Enrollment in each building ranges between 350 and 400 students annually. Several extracurricular athletic programs are available at the middle and high school levels, including football, basketball, volleyball, wrestling, cross country, track and golf. FHS also fields teams for cheer, flag football, tennis, baseball and softball.

According to the State of Indiana Department of Education, Fremont Community Schools has been declared a Performance-Qualified school district for the 2026-27 School Year.

The town has a lending library, the Fremont Public Library. The library offers a variety of programming for its patrons, including book clubs, classic movie nights, weekly yoga sessions, story time with snacks and crafts, and a new book coffee hour for sharing and discussing the library's newest acquisitions. It also has a local history room.

== Manufacturing ==
Fremont is home to several manufacturing facilities, including Carver Non-woven Technologies LLC, Cold Heading, Swager Communications, New Horizons Baking Company, Health Equipment Mfg., Inc. and Dexter Axle. Among others is Cardinal IG, which came to Fremont in March 1998. Cardinal IG, manufacturers of glass products, have been recognized as a green company, recycling virtually all of the plastic, paper and cardboard used in manufacturing processes.

== Downtown Revitalization ==
In December 2010, Fremont was awarded $500,000 (~$699,989 in 2024) from the State of Indiana for its downtown revitalization project. According to the Town of Fremont website, the plan included improvements for pedestrian traffic, new street lighting and signage options, and reverse angle parking along Toledo Street for two blocks between Tolford and Pleasant Streets. Construction began in September 2011 and was finished roughly 90 days later.
