= Sports in Fort Wayne, Indiana =

Fort Wayne, Indiana, is home to several sports teams. These include the NBA's Fort Wayne Pistons (now in Detroit), the Fort Wayne Daisies of the All-American Girls Professional Baseball League, and the Fort Wayne Kekiongas of the National Association of Professional Baseball

== History ==
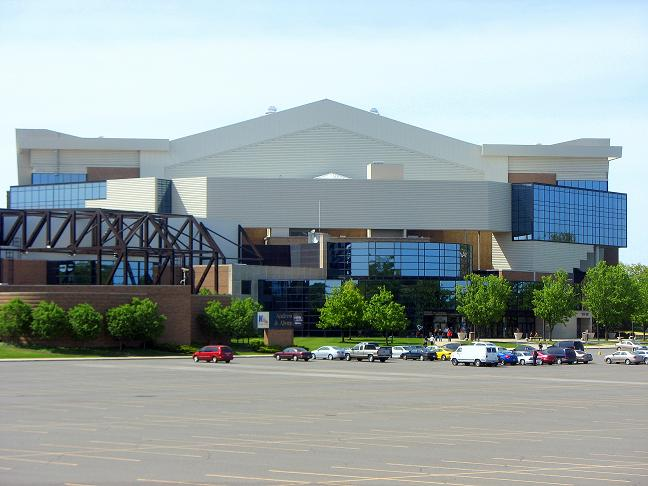
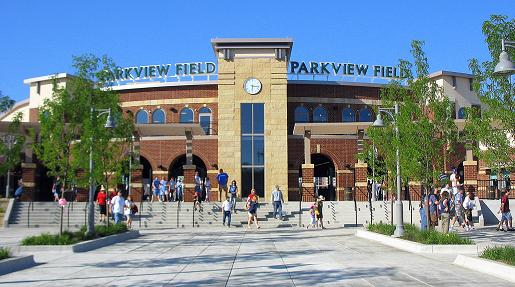
Allen County War Memorial Coliseum (top) and Parkview Field (bottom).

Fort Wayne has been home to a few sports firsts. On June 2, 1883, Fort Wayne hosted the Quincy Professionals for one of the first lighted baseball games ever recorded. Fort Wayne has been credited for being the birthplace of the NBA when Fort Wayne Pistons owner Fred Zollner brokered the merger of the BAA and the NBL in 1949 from his kitchen table. The Fort Wayne Zollner Pistons, who later became the Detroit Pistons, were charter members of the National Basketball League (a forerunner to the NBA) and won back-to-back NBL championships in 1944 and 1945. Also, on March 10, 1961, Wilt Chamberlain became the first player in the NBA to reach 3,000 points in a single season while competing at Memorial Coliseum.

Fort Wayne hosted two NBA Finals Games in 1955 and 1956, as well as the third city to host the NBA All-Star Game in 1953. The Allen County War Memorial Coliseum was also venue to the 2000 NCAA Men's Division I Volleyball Championship matches, in addition to hosting the 2000, 2001, and 2002 Mid-Continent Conference men's basketball tournaments. Fort Wayne also annually hosts the U.S.S.S.A. National and Boys State Championships, held at Spiece Fieldhouse.

On November 22, 1950, the Fort Wayne Pistons defeated the Minneapolis Lakers with a final score of 19 to 18 in the lowest scoring game in NBA history.

Fort Wayne hosted another major league team in a Big Four sport, the Fort Wayne Kekiongas of the National Association. The National Association was the first professional baseball league and the forerunner of the National League; it is sometimes considered to have been a major league, and sometimes not. The Kekiongas were a founding member of the national association (in 1871), and played and won the first National Association game, but disbanded partway through the 1871 season.

Wildcat Baseball League was a baseball league in Fort Wayne formed by Dale McMillen in April 1960 as an alternative to Little League Baseball. Fort Wayne was rated the "Best Place in the Country for Minor League Sports" in a 2007 issue of Street & Smith's Sports Business Journal.

== Current sports teams ==
Professional Sports in Fort Wayne
Team	Sport	Current league	Established	Venue	Championships
Fort Wayne Derby Girls	Roller derby	WFTDA	2005	Memorial Coliseum	0
Fort Wayne Komets	Ice hockey	ECHL	1952	Memorial Coliseum	10 (Note: The Komets 10 championships are: 4 (IHL), 4 (UHL/IHL), 1 (CHL), 1 (ECHL).)
Fort Wayne TinCaps	Baseball	Midwest League	1993	Parkview Field	1
Fort Wayne FC	Soccer	USL League One	2019	Ruoff Mortgage Stadium	0

College Sports in Fort Wayne
Program	Classification	Current conference
Purdue Fort Wayne Mastodons	NCAA Division I	Horizon League
Indiana Tech Warriors	NAIA	Wolverine–Hoosier Athletic Conference
Saint Francis Cougars	NAIA	Crossroads League; Mid-States Football Association (football)

== Former sports teams ==
Professional Sports in Fort Wayne
Team	Sport	League	Existence	Venue	Championships
Fort Wayne Caseys	Basketball	American Basketball League	1925–1926		0
Fort Wayne Chiefs	Baseball	Central League	1917–1935	League Park	2
Fort Wayne Daisies	Baseball	All-American Girls Professional Baseball League	1943–1954	North Side High School; Memorial Park	0
Fort Wayne Fever	Soccer	Premier Development League	2003–2009	Hefner Stadium	0
Fort Wayne Fever	Women's Soccer	W-League	2004–2009	Hefner Stadium	0
Fort Wayne FireHawks	Indoor football	Continental Indoor Football League	2010	Allen County War Memorial Coliseum	0
Fort Wayne Flames	Soccer	American Indoor Soccer Association	1986–1989	Allen County War Memorial Coliseum	0
Fort Wayne Flash	Women's Football	Women's Football Alliance	2007–2011	Woodlan Junior / Senior High School	0
Fort Wayne Freedom	Indoor football	Continental Indoor Football League	2003–2006, 2008–2009	Allen County War Memorial Coliseum	0
Fort Wayne Friars	Football	Independent	1909–1917, 1920–1921	League Park	
Fort Wayne Fury	Basketball	Continental Basketball Association	1991–2001	Allen County War Memorial Coliseum	0
Fort Wayne Fusion	Arena football	af2	2007	Allen County War Memorial Coliseum	0
Fort Wayne General Electrics	Basketball	National Basketball League	1937–1938	North Side High School Gym	0
Fort Wayne Hoosiers	Basketball	American Basketball League	1926–1931		0
Fort Wayne Indians	Baseball	Interstate League	1896–1900	League Park	1
Fort Wayne Kekiongas	Baseball	National Association of Professional Base Ball Players	1871	Kekionga Ball Grounds	0
Fort Wayne Mad Ants	Basketball	NBA G League	2007–2023	Memorial Coliseum	1
Fort Wayne (Zollner) Pistons	Basketball	National Basketball League; National Basketball Association	1941–1948; 1949–1957	North Side High School Gym; Allen County War Memorial Coliseum	2 (NBL); 0 (NBA)
Fort Wayne Railroaders	Baseball	Central League	1901–1914	League Park	4
Fort Wayne River City Rhinos	Football	Mid Continental Football League	1998–2001	Zollner Stadium	0
Fort Wayne Safari	Football	Indoor Professional Football League	2000–2002	Allen County War Memorial Coliseum	(never played)
Fort Wayne Scouts	Hockey	Continental Hockey League	1978–1979		0
Indiana Kick	Soccer	American Indoor Soccer Association	1989–1990	Allen County War Memorial Coliseum	0
Fort Wayne Warriors	Football	Continental Football League	1965	Zollner Stadium	0

== Notable natives and former residents ==
=== Athletes ===
==== Professional baseball ====
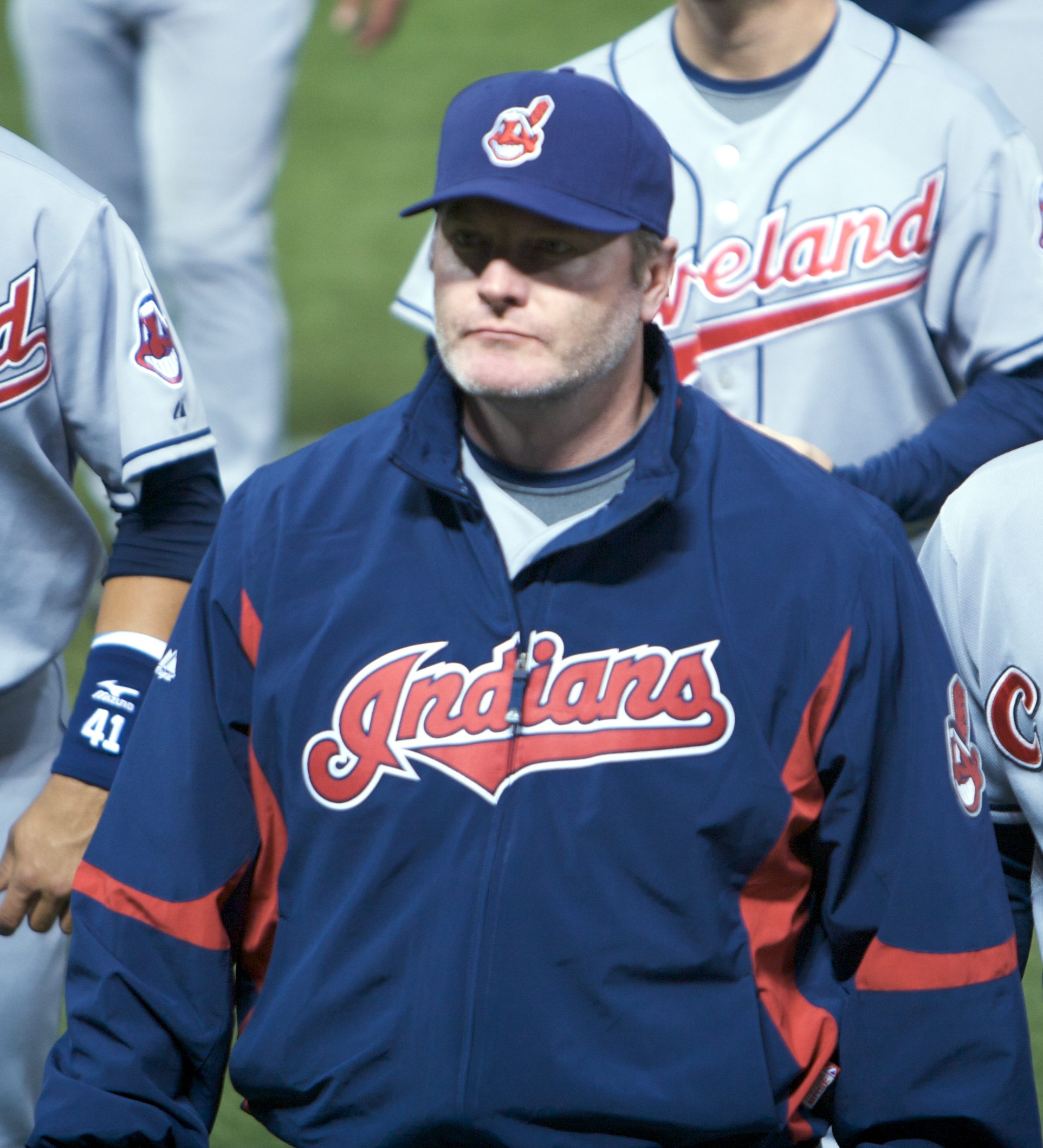
Manager of the Cleveland Indians from 2003 to 2009, Fort Wayne native Eric Wedge.

- Rob Bowen, MLB (2003–2008) Minnesota Twins, San Diego Padres, Chicago Cubs, Oakland Athletics
- Dottie Collins, AAGPBL (1944–1950) Minneapolis Millerettes, Fort Wayne Daisies
- David Doster, MLB (1996, 1999) Philadelphia Phillies
- Bill Everitt, MLB (1895–1901) Chicago Colts/Orphans, Washington Senators
- Louie Heilbroner, manager, MLB (1900) St. Louis Cardinals
- Butch Henline, MLB (1921–1931) New York Giants, Philadelphia Phillies, Brooklyn Robins, Chicago White Sox
- Ralph Miller, MLB (1920–1924) Philadelphia Phillies, Washington Senators
- Eric Wedge, player, MLB (1991–1994) Boston Red Sox, Colorado Rockies; manager, MLB (2003–2009) Cleveland Indians and Seattle Mariners
- Kevin Kiermaier, MLB (2013–2024) Tampa Bay Rays, Toronto Blue Jays, Los Angeles Dodgers
- Jarrod Parker, MLB (2011–2013) Arizona Diamondbacks, Oakland Athletics

==== Professional basketball ====
- Paul "Curly" Armstrong, NBA (1948/49-1950/51) Fort Wayne Pistons
- Dan Godfread, NBA (1990/91-1991/92) Minnesota Timberwolves, Houston Rockets
- Ralph Albert "Ham" Hamilton, NBA (1948/49) Fort Wayne Pistons
- Henry James, NBA (1990/91-1997/98) Cleveland Cavaliers, Utah Jazz, Sacramento Kings, Los Angeles Clippers, Houston Rockets, Atlanta Hawks
- Bobby Milton, player and manager of Harlem Globetrotters
- Brad Miller, NBA (1998/99-2011/12) Charlotte Hornets, Chicago Bulls, Indiana Pacers, Sacramento Kings, Houston Rockets, Minnesota Timberwolves
- Bill Roberts, NBA (1948/49-1949/50) Chicago Stags, Boston Celtics, St. Louis Bombers
- George Yardley, NBA (1953/54-1959/60) Fort Wayne Pistons/Detroit Pistons
- Tiffany Gooden, ABL (1998), Colorado Xplosion
- Deshaun Thomas, EuroLeague (2013–present) Panathinaikos B.C.
- Caleb Swanigan, NBA (2017/18-2019/20) Portland Trail Blazers

==== Professional BMX ====
- Barry McManus, BMX racer in 1980-'90s
- Scott Yoquelet, BMX racer in 1990–2000s
- Joey Marks, BMX dirt freestyle 1998–2010
- Brian Doty, BMX racer 1980-'90s

==== Professional football ====
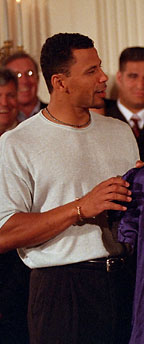
Pro Football Hall of Famer, native Rod Woodson.

- Mike Augustyniak, NFL (1981–1983) New York Jets
- Jason Baker, NFL (2001–2012) San Francisco 49ers, Philadelphia Eagles, Kansas City Chiefs, Indianapolis Colts, Denver Broncos, Carolina Panthers
- Roosevelt Barnes, NFL (1982–1985) Detroit Lions
- Bill Boedeker, NFL (1946–1950) Chicago Rockets, Cleveland Browns, Philadelphia Eagles, Green Bay Packers
- Johnny Bright, CFL (1952–1964) Calgary Stampeders, Edmonton Eskimos, subject of the "Johnny Bright Incident"
- Bob Cowan, NFL (1947–1949) Cleveland Browns, Baltimore Colts
- John Diettrich, NFL (1987)Houston Oilers
- Vaughn Dunbar, NFL (1992–1995) New Orleans Saints, Jacksonville Jaguars
- Tyler Eifert, NFL (2013–2020) Cincinnati Bengals, Jacksonville Jaguars
- Eric England, NFL (1994–1996) Arizona Cardinals
- Trai Essex, NFL (2005–2012) Pittsburgh Steelers, Super Bowl XL champion, Indianapolis Colts
- Jason Fabini, NFL (1998–2008) New York Jets, Dallas Cowboys, Washington Redskins
- James Hardy, NFL (2008–2011) Buffalo Bills, Baltimore Ravens
- Selwyn Lymon, NFL (no professional games played) Miami Dolphins
- Le'Ron McClain, NFL (2007–2013) Baltimore Ravens, Kansas City Chiefs, San Diego Chargers
- Bernard Pollard, NFL (2006–2014) Kansas City Chiefs, Houston Texans, Baltimore Ravens, Tennessee Titans
- Emil Sitko, NFL (1950–1952) San Francisco 49ers, Chicago Cardinals
- Lamar Smith, NFL (1994–2003) Seattle Seahawks, New Orleans Saints, Miami Dolphins, Carolina Panthers
- Anthony Spencer, NFL (2007–2015) Dallas Cowboys, New Orleans Saints
- Rod Woodson, NFL (1987–2003) Pittsburgh Steelers, San Francisco 49ers, Baltimore Ravens, Oakland Raiders, Pro Football Hall of Famer
- Rod Smith, NFL (2015–present) Seattle Seahawks, Dallas Cowboys, New York Giants, Tennessee Titans, Las Vegas Raiders
- Jaylon Smith, NFL (2016–present) Dallas Cowboys, Green Bay Packers, New York Giants, New Orleans Saints, Las Vegas Raiders
- Drue Tranquill, NFL (2019–present) Los Angeles Chargers, Kansas City Chiefs

==== Professional golf ====
- Amanda Blumenherst
- Billy Kratzert, golfer and sportscaster
- Cathy Kratzert Gerring

==== Professional hockey ====
- Drake Batherson, NHL (2018-present) Ottawa Senators
- Fred Knipscheer NHL (1993/94-1995/1996) Boston Bruins, St. Louis Blues
- Dale Purinton, NHL (1999/2000–2003/04) New York Rangers

==== Martial arts ====
- Adam Bobay, UFC
- Jon Fitch, UFC
- Dave Herman, MMA fighter with EliteXC (Elite Xtreme Combat)

==== Professional soccer ====
- DaMarcus Beasley, Rangers F.C. of the Scottish Premier League, U.S. national team, MLS Chicago Fire
- Jamar Beasley, MLS New England Revolution, Chicago Fire
- Bronn Pfeiffer, Fort Wayne Flames, Indiana Kicks, Chicago Power, and Detroit Rockers in the National Professional Soccer League.
- Mike Harper, Baton Rouge Bombers of the Eastern Indoor Soccer League.

==== Olympic swimming and diving ====
- Steve Bigelow, swimmer, 1988 Summer Olympics
- Mark Virts, diver, participated in boycott of the 1980 Summer Olympics led by President Jimmy Carter
- Matt Vogel, swimmer, two-time Olympic gold medalist, 1976 Summer Olympics
- Sharon Wichman, swimmer, Olympic gold medalist, 1968 Summer Olympics
- Dan Zehr, swimmer, 1932 Summer Olympics

==== Olympic track and field ====
- LeShundra "DeDee" Nathan, 2000 Summer Olympics

==== Professional volleyball ====
- Angie Akers, professional beach volleyball player
- Lloy Ball, Olympic gold medalist, 2008 Summer Olympics

==== Other notable individuals ====
- Eugene E. Parker, sports agent, 45th in "Sports Illustrated"'s 101 most influential minorities in sports
- Art Smith, aviator, invented "loop the loop"
- Jessie Lopez, US National Rugby Union Team, 1978

=== Northeast Indiana's Top 50 Athletes ===
The News-Sentinel's Northeast Indiana's Top 50 Athletes of the 20th century are:

1. Rod Woodson
2. Johnny Bright
3. George Yardley
4. Everett Scott
5. Len Thornson
6. Bobby McDermott
7. Don Lash
8. DeDee Nathan
9. Lloy Ball
10. Cathy Gerring
11. Bill Kratzert
12. Matt Vogel
13. Sharon (Wichman) Jones
14. Emil Sitko
15. Eugene "Bubbles" Hargrave
16. Dottie Wiltse Collins
17. Willie Long
18. Ivan Acosta
19. Eddie Long
20. Paul "Curly" Armstrong
21. Bill Wambsganss
22. MaChelle Joseph
23. Steve Hargan
24. Henry James
25. Gene Hartley
26. Bill West
27. Bernie Kampschmidt
28. Joanne Weaver
29. Herm Schaefer
30. Lionel Repka
31. Vaughn Dunbar
32. Walter Jordan
33. Bruce Miller
34. Lashanda Harper
35. Nel Fettig
36. Terry Pembroke
37. Steve Platt
38. Tom Beerman
39. Cathey Tyree
40. Jason Fabini
41. Tiffany Gooden
42. Lamar Smith
43. Leslie Johnson
44. Tom Bolyard
45. Roosevelt Barnes
46. Conan Myers
47. Lee Ann Reed
48. Tom Kelley
49. Mike Augustyniak
50. Colin Chin

== See also ==
- Fort Wayne Open
