= Tiffany Gooden =

American lawyer

Personal information
- Born: October 23, 1975 (age 51)
- Listed height: 5 ft 11 in (1.80 m)
- Listed weight: 165 lb (75 kg)

Career information
- High school: R. Nelson Snider (Fort Wayne, Indiana)
- College: Iowa (1994–1998)
- ABL draft: 1998: 2nd round, 18th overall pick
- Drafted by: Colorado Xplosion
- Position: Forward

Career history
- 1998: Colorado Xplosion

Career highlights
- Big Ten Freshman of the Year (1995); Second-team All-Big Ten (1996); First-team Parade All-American (1994); Indiana Miss Basketball (1994); Naismith Prep Player of the Year (1994)
- Stats at Basketball Reference

Tiffany Gooden (born October 23, 1975) is an American former professional basketball player in the ABL. When her pro career ended, Gooden embarked on a new career as an attorney. Gooden currently practices law as a partner in the firm of Hall & Gooden LLP in her hometown of Fort Wayne, Indiana. Her efforts played a key role in bringing the Indiana high school girls' basketball championships to Fort Wayne after the 2009 season.

Gooden's relative athletic greatness has been recognized by both of her hometown newspapers. The News-Sentinel recently named Gooden 41st among the Top 50 athletes of northeast Indiana. The Journal Gazette presents the Tiffany Gooden award annually to the most outstanding high school basketball player in Fort Wayne's Summit Athletic Conference.

== Early life ==
Even as a young woman, the basketball prospects of Tiffany Gooden were apparent to those who knew her. As middle-schooler and into her high school years, Gooden was named an AAU All-American five consecutive years. During her AAU career, Gooden played for four teams that won national titles.

== High school career ==
Gooden attended R. Nelson Snider High School in Fort Wayne, Indiana.

Gooden was a prolific scorer throughout her high school career. She is still ranked 13th best all-time among all Indiana high school girls' basketball players with 2,198 points scored.

As a sophomore, Gooden finished 8th in the state in scoring points per game. As a junior, she improved to 4th in the state, averaging 29.9 points per game. She also finished 4th in her senior year, averaging an identical 29.9 points per game.

In tribute to her great impact on the basketball floor, Gooden received several postseason awards at the end of her senior year. The ultimate recognition came when it was announced that Gooden was winner of the 1994 Naismith Award, a prestigious honor given annually by the Atlanta Tipoff Club to the high school girls basketball player of the year. Gooden was also named to the 1994 Parade All-American team as the National Player of the Year.

After graduating, Gooden wore the #1 jersey as recipient of the 1994 Indiana Miss Basketball award. She led the Indiana All-stars in a pair of games against cross-border rivals from Kentucky. Gooden played a significant role in the Indiana sweep of the two-game series. In the process, she scored 31 points as Indiana won the first game in Kentucky, and she scored 24 points in the following victory in Indianapolis. Her two-game total of 55 points still stands as the best two-game efforts in the history of the series.

In 2000, it was announced that Gooden was one of 12 players named to the IHSAA's "First Silver Era" team, celebrating the first 25 years of Indiana high school girls' basketball.

=== Awards and accomplishments ===
- Career accomplishments
  - currently 13th best all-time leading scorer, Indiana girls' basketball
  - member, IHSAA's "The First Silver Era" team, celebrating the first 25 years of Indiana high school girls basketball
  - 1st best all-time scoring (55 pts), Indiana/Kentucky All-star series
  - participant, 1995 National Olympic Festival
- 1993/94 - Senior
  - 1994 winner, Naismith Award - honoring the nation's high school basketball player of the year
  - 1st team and National Player of the Year, Parade All-American
  - 1994 Indiana Miss Basketball
  - 1994 Outstanding Senior, Indiana AAU
  - 4th in state in scoring average (29.9 ppg)
- 1992/93 - Junior
  - 4th in state in scoring average (29.9 ppg)
- 1991/92 - Sophomore
  - 8th in state in scoring average

== College career ==
As a freshman, Gooden was named the 1995 Big Ten Freshman of the Year. Her sophomore season, Gooden made the All Big-10 Team as a 2nd team selection. But injuries slowed Gooden's progress in college, and she finished her career with 1,024 points.

=== Awards and accomplishments ===
- 1997/98 - Senior
  - Academic All Big-10 team
- 1996/97 - Junior
  - Academic All Big-10 team
- 1995/96 - Sophomore
  - All Big-10, 2nd team
  - Academic All Big-10 team
  - Led Iowa in scoring, with 481 points (14.1 ppg)
  - Led Iowa in 3-point field goal percentage (24–66, .364)
- 1994/95 - Freshman
  - Big-10 Freshman Player of the Year
  - Led Iowa in 3-point field goal percentage (27–87, .310)

== Professional career ==
After her college career, Gooden participated in the 1998 ABL Draft. She was selected in the 2nd round, the 18th pick overall, by the Colorado Xplosion. Gooden's career lasted 13 games before the team and league folded and ceased playing games.

== Post-playing career ==
Gooden's success continued after her playing days were over. In addition to her selection to the Big 10 athletic teams, Gooden was a 3-time member of the Academic All Big-10 team, being named in 1996, 1997, and again in 1998. Gooden completed her undergraduate studies with a degree in Communication Studies. In 1998, she was one of the recipients of an NCAA Post-Graduate scholarship, which she applied toward her enrollment in Iowa's law school. She graduated from law school and returned to her home town to become a practicing attorney.

== Tiffany Gooden Award ==
In recognition of her outstanding contributions to her community both on and off the basketball court, Gooden was honored by a local newspaper. Each year, The Journal Gazette awards the Tiffany Gooden Award to the most outstanding basketball player in the SAC. The award has been given since 1994, when Gooden was named the first award winner.

=== Tiffany Gooden Award Winners ===
Year	Award Winner	High School
1994	Tiffany Gooden	Snider
1995	Keion Brooks	North Side
1996	B. J. Caretta	Bishop Dwenger
1997	Cameron Stephens	South Side
1998	Vnemina Reese	South Side
1999	Vernard Hollins	North Side
2000	Rachel King	Bishop Luers
2001	Rachel King	Bishop Luers
2002	Megan Dossen	Bishop Luers
2003	James Hardy	Elmhurst
2004	James Hardy	Elmhurst
2005	Selwyn Lymon	Harding
2006	Marques Johnson	Snider
2007	Sha'la Jackson	South Side
2008	Deshaun Thomas	Bishop Luers
2009	Deshaun Thomas	Bishop Luers
2010	Deshaun Thomas	Bishop Luers
2011	Brierra Young	Bishop Luers
2012	Akilah Sims	Snider
2013	Bryson Scott	Northrop

==== Winners by school ====
High School	Winners	Years
Bishop Luers	7	2000, 2001, 2002, 2008, 2009, 2010, 2011
Snider	3	1994, 2006, 2012
South Side	3	1997, 1998, 2007
Elmhurst	2	2003, 2004
North Side	2	1995, 1999
Bishop Dwenger	1	1996
Harding	1	2005
Northrop	1	2013
