= Summit Athletic Conference =

High school athletic conference in Indiana, United States

- Founded: c. 1935; Fort Wayne City Series; 1973; Summit Athletic
- No. of teams: 10; 4 Class 3A, 2 Class 3A, 1 Class 2A
- Region: 1 County: Allen, Indiana

Locations
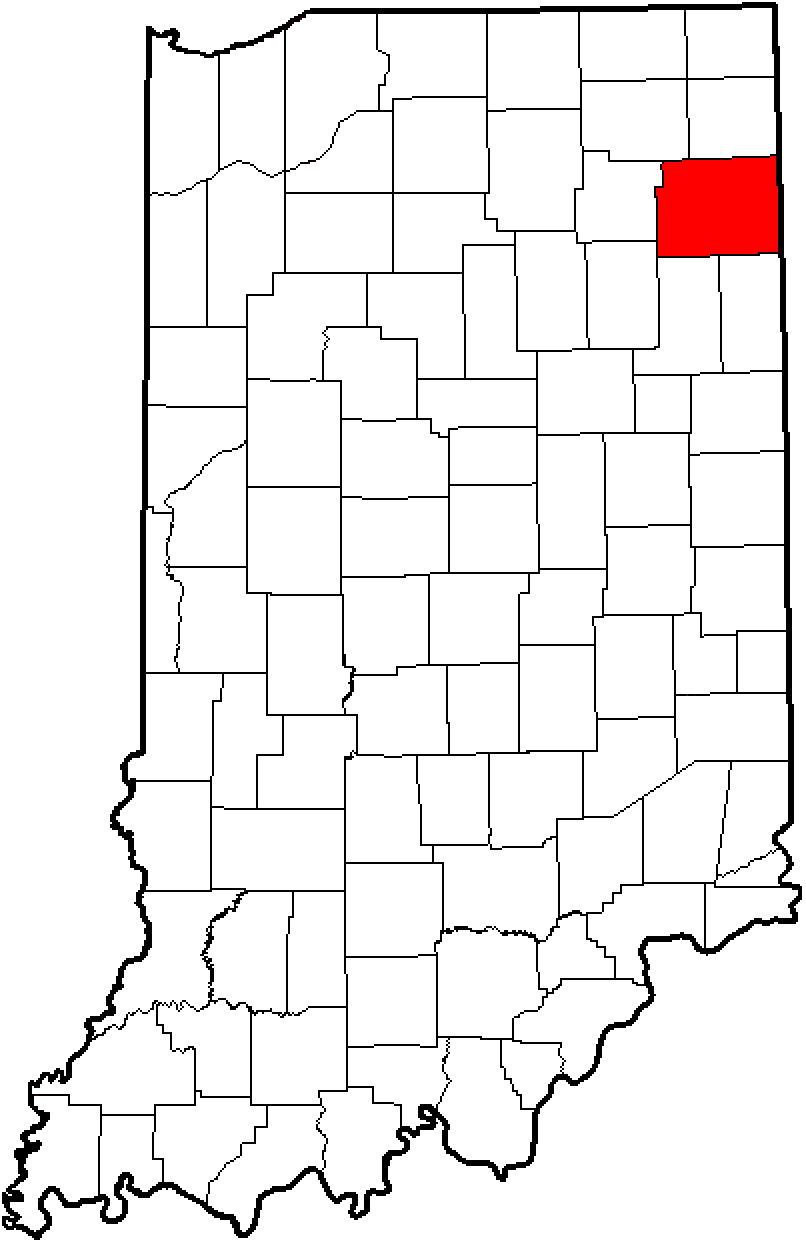

The Summit Athletic Conference, or SAC, is a high school athletic conference consisting of ten high schools located in Fort Wayne, Indiana. Three of the schools are private; one being a Lutheran academy, and the other two being Catholic preparatories. The rest are public schools, being part of Fort Wayne Community Schools. Two limited members are part of Northwest Allen County Schools and Southwest Allen County Schools.

All member schools are located in Allen County, Indiana. Originally called the Fort Wayne City Series, the name was changed to the Summit Athletic Conference in 1973, when Harding High School joined.

Elmhurst High School closed at the end of the 2009–10 academic year, with students being spread out between North Side, South Side, and Wayne high schools. Harding closed at the end of the 2010–11 school year.

== Membership ==
School	Mascot	School Corp.	Colors	Size	IHSAA Class (Football)	Year joined	Previous conference
Bishop Dwenger	Saints	R.C.D. FWSB		1,050	3A (5A)	1965	None
Bishop Luers	Knights	R.C.D. FWSB		590	2A (2A)	1960	None
Carroll	Chargers	N.A.C.S.		2,200	4A (6A)	2015	NE8
Concordia Lutheran^{1}	Cadets	LCMS		675	3A (3A)	1952; 1965	None; NEIAC
Homestead	Spartans	S.A.C.S.		2,600	4A (6A)	2015	NE8
North Side^{2, 3}	Legends	F.W.C.S.		1,683	4A (5A)	1934	NEIAC
Northrop	Bruins	F.W.C.S.		2,181	4A (5A)	1971	None
Snider	Panthers	F.W.C.S.		1,865	4A (5A)	1965	None
South Side^{2, 4}	Archers	F.W.C.S.		1,479	4A (4A)	1934	NEIAC
Wayne	Generals	F.W.C.S.		1,504	4A (4A)	1971	None

1. Concordia played in the NEIAC 1955–65, and in both the FWCS/Summit and NEIAC 1965–75.
2. North Side and South Side played concurrently in the FWCS and NEIAC 1934–1940.
3. North Side played concurrently in the FWCS and Northern Indiana Athletic Conference 1942–65.
4. South Side played concurrently in the FWCS and Central Indiana Athletic Conference 1945–47.

== Former members ==
School	Mascot	School Corp.	Colors	Year joined	Previous conference	Year left	Conference joined
Central^{1}	Tigers	F.W.C.S.		1934	NE IN	1971	none (school closed)
Central Catholic^{2}	Irish	R.C.D. FWSB		1934	none (new school)	1972	none (school closed)
Elmhurst	Trojans	F.W.C.S.		1966	NE Indiana	2010	none (school closed)
Harding^{3}	Hawks	East Allen		1973	none (new school)	2011	none (school closed)

1. Central played concurrently in the FWCS and NEIAC 1934–40. Central split into Northrop and Wayne when school closed.
2. Central Catholic, while a FWCS member, did not join the IHSAA until 1946, when private schools and segregated public schools were allowed into the organization.
3. Harding was converted to magnet school in 2012.

=== Football divisions ===
From 1971 to 1979, football competition was divided into North and South divisions.

North	South
Bishop Dwenger	Bishop Luers
Concordia	Elmhurst
Northrop	Harding
North Side	South Side
Snider	Wayne

== Conference champions ==
=== Football ===
#	Team	Seasons
21	North Side	1935*, 1937, 1938, 1940, 1943*, 1946, 1951, 1953, 1955, 1956, 1957*, 1958, 1963, 1964, 1972 (N)*; 1979 (N, O), 1984, 1987, 1988, 1991*, 2013
21	Bishop Dwenger	1967*, 1968, 1971 (N)*, 1973 (N), 1974 (N, O), 1975 (N)*, 1976 (N)*, 1978 (N, O); 1983, 1989, 1990, 1991*, 1996, 2006, 2007, 2008, 2009, 2010, 2015, 2018
21	Snider	1966, 1971 (N)*, 1976 (N)*, 1977 (N)*, 1981, 1982, 1985, 1986, 1992, 1994, 1995, 1997, 1998, 1999, 2002, 2004, 2005, 2012, 2014*, 2016, 2017, 2021
16	Bishop Luers	1961, 1969, 1971 (S, O), 1972 (S, O), 1973 (S, O), 1974 (S)*, 1975 (S, O), 1977 (S)*, 1979 (S)*; 1980, 1993*, 2000, 2001, 2011, 2014*, 2021
11	South Side	1934, 1936, 1943*, 1944, 1947, 1948, 1965, 1974 (S)*, 1977 (S)*, 1978 (S)*, 1979 (S)
9	Central	1935*, 1939, 1941, 1942, 1945, 1949, 1957*, 1959, 1970
6	Central Catholic	1950, 1952, 1954, 1957*, 1960, 1962
4	Elmhurst	1974 (S)*, 1976 (S, O), 1978 (S)*, 1979 (S)*
4	Wayne	1978 (S)*, 1979 (S), 1991*, 1993*, 2014*
3	Northrop	1972 (N)*, 1975 (N)*, 1977 (N, O)*
2	Carroll (FW)	2021, 2022
2	Homestead	2019, 2020
1	Concordia Lutheran	1967*
1	Harding	2003

- N and S designations are division champions, O denotes title game winner.

=== Boys basketball ===
#	Team	Seasons
6	North Side	1995, 1999*, 2006, 2013*, 2014, 2015
5	Bishop Dwenger	1994, 1996, 1998, 2004, 2007
4	Concordia Lutheran	1999*, 2000*, 2003*, 2013*
4	Harding	2001, 2002, 2008, 2010
4	Homestead	2016, 2019, 2021, 2022
4	Snider	2003*, 2005, 2009, 2017
4	South Side	1997, 1999*, 2000*, 2003*
4	Wayne	2000*, 2023, 2024, 2025
3	Bishop Luers	2011, 2012, 2020
2	Carroll (FW)	2018, 2019
2	Northrop	2013*, 2019
0	Central	
0	Central Catholic	
0	Elmhurst	

=== Girls basketball ===
#	Team	Seasons
7	Homestead	2016, 2017, 2018, 2019, 2020, 2022, 2025
6	Bishop Luers	2001, 2003, 2005, 2006, 2007, 2011
3	Concordia Lutheran	2002, 2010, 2014
3	Snider	2004, 2015, 2024
2	Elmhurst	2008, 2009
2	South Side	2012, 2013
1	Carroll (FW)	2021
1	Northrop	2023
0	Bishop Dwenger	
0	Harding	
0	North Side	
0	Wayne	

== State championships ==
=== Bishop Dwenger Saints (13) ===
- 1983 Football (3A)
- 1990 Football (3A)
- 1991 Football (3A)
- 1995 Gymnastics
- 2003 Gymnastics
- 2005 Gymnastics
- 2005 Girls Soccer
- 2006 Gymnastics
- 2006 Girls Soccer
- 2010 Softball (3A)
- 2012 Gymnastics
- 2015 Football (4A)
- 2018 Football (4A)

=== Bishop Luers Knights (20) ===
- 1985 Football (2A)
- 1989 Football (2A)
- 1992 Football (2A)
- 1999 Girls Basketball (2A)
- 1999 Football (2A)
- 2000 Girls Basketball (2A)
- 2001 Football (2A)
- 2001 Girls Basketball (2A)
- 2002 Football (2A)
- 2002 Girls Basketball (2A)
- 2006 Girls Basketball (2A)
- 2007 Football (2A)
- 2008 Boys Basketball (2A)
- 2008 Baseball (2A)
- 2009 Football (2A)
- 2009 Boys Basketball (2A)
- 2010 Football (2A)
- 2011 Girls Basketball (2A)
- 2011 Football (2A)
- 2012 Football (2A)

=== Concordia Lutheran Cadets (7) ===
- 1983 Girls Cross Country
- 1999 Boys Track & Field
- 2010 Girls Basketball (3A)
- 2012 Girls Basketball (3A)
- 2014 Girls Volleyball (3A)
- 2016 Football (3A)
- 2019 Boys Cross Country

=== North Side Legends (7) ===
- 1941 Boys Track & Field
- 1942 Boys Track & Field
- 1956 Boys Track & Field
- 1957 Boys Track & Field
- 1963 Boys Track & Field
- 1965 Boys Track & Field
- 1968 Boys Cross-Country

=== Northrop Bruins (16) ===
- 1974 Boys Basketball
- 1981 Girls Track & Field
- 1983 Baseball
- 1984 Boys Golf
- 1986 Girls Basketball
- 1991 Girls Track & Field
- 1997 Boys Track & Field
- 2000 Girls Track & Field
- 2001 Girls Track & Field
- 2002 Girls Track & Field
- 2003 Girls Track & Field
- 2004 Boys Track & Field
- 2004 Girls gymnastics
- 2005 Girls Track & Field
- 2011 Girls Track & Field
- 2013 Girls Track & Field

=== Snider Panthers (9) ===
- 1974 Boys Track & Field
- 1987 Volleyball
- 1988 Girls Basketball
- 1991 Volleyball
- 1992 Football (5A)
- 2003 Wrestling
- 2006 Baseball (4A)
- 2009 Baseball (4A)
- 2015 Football (5A)
- 2023 Football (5A)

=== South Side Archers (7) ===
- 1938 Boys Basketball
- 1958 Boys Basketball
- 1968 Boys Track & Field
- 1980 Girls Track & Field
- 1985 Girls Track & Field
- 1986 Girls Track & Field
- 1989 Girls Track & Field
- 2013 Girls Basketball Runner-up.

=== Wayne Generals (3) ===
- 1973 Girls Tennis
- 1979 Boys Track & Field
- 1995 Football (4A)

=== Homestead Spartans (11) ===
- 2015 Boys Basketball (4A) [not in SAC]
- 2017 Girls Basketball (4A)
- 2019 Girls Golf [not in SAC]
- 2021 Girls Soccer (3A) [not in SAC]
- 2023 Girls Cross Country [not in SAC]
- 1983, 1984, 1985, 1996, 1999, 2001 Girls Gymnastics [not in SAC]

=== Central Tigers (2) ^{1} ===
- 1943 Boys Basketball
- 1944 Boys Track & Field

=== Central Catholic Irish (2) ^{1} ===
- 1950 Football (mythical champion)
- 1959 Boys Golf

=== Elmhurst Trojans (1) ^{1} ===
- 2009 Girls Basketball (3A)

=== Harding Hawks (4) ^{1} ===
- 1994 Girls Track & Field
- 1995 Girls Track & Field
- 2001 Boys Basketball (2A)
- 2006 Football (2A)

^{1} Won while SAC Member.

== Notable athletes ==
- Jason Baker, NFL punter
- Jessie Bates, NFL safety
- Damarcus Beasley, professional soccer player, two time FIFA World Cup Finals participant
- Jamar Beasley, professional soccer player
- Vaughn Dunbar, former professional football player, NFL New Orleans Saints
- Tyler Eifert, NFL tight end
- Trai Essex, NFL, offensive lineman
- Jason Fabini, NFL offensive tackle for the Jets, Cowboys and Washington Football Team
- Josh Gaines, AFL defensive lineman
- Tiffany Gooden, former professional basketball player, Colorado Xplosion
- James Hardy, NFL wide receiver
- Jim Hinga, NCAA Div I basketball coach
- Selwyn Lymon, NFL, wide receiver
- Jim Master, Indiana Mr. Basketball (1980), high school All-American, University of Kentucky
- Jarrod Parker, MLB pitcher, graduated from Norwell High School after attending Wayne High School
- Bernard Pollard, NFL safety
- Brian Reith, former MLB pitcher
- Ben Skowronek, NFL wide receiver
- Jaylon Smith, NFL linebacker
- Lamar Smith, NFL running back
- Rod Smith, NFL running back
- Anthony Spencer, NFL linebacker
- Caleb Swanigan, Former NBA Player
- Deshaun Thomas, Indiana's 3rd all-time leading men's scorer in basketball
- Max Touloute, professional soccer player, Haitian national team member
- Eric Wedge, MLB manager
- Sharon Wichman, swimmer, Olympic gold medalist, 1968 Summer Olympics
- Rod Woodson, NFL Hall of Famer

== Resources ==
- IHSAA Conferences
- IHSAA Directory
