= Northwest Allen County Schools =

Public school district in Indiana

Northwest Allen County Schools (NACS)

Location
- 12913 Coldwater Road; Fort Wayne, Indiana Allen County

District information
- Type: Public
- Grades: PK-12
- Superintendent: Wayne Barker
- Asst. superintendent(s): Bill Toler & Brandon Bitting
- School board: 5 members
- Schools: 8 Elementary, 3 Middle, 1 High
- Budget: $69.121 Million

Students and staff
- Students: 8300+
- Teachers: 434
- Athletic conference: Summit
- Colors: Navy Maize

Other information
- Graduation Rate: 96.7%
- Website: www.nacs.k12.in.us

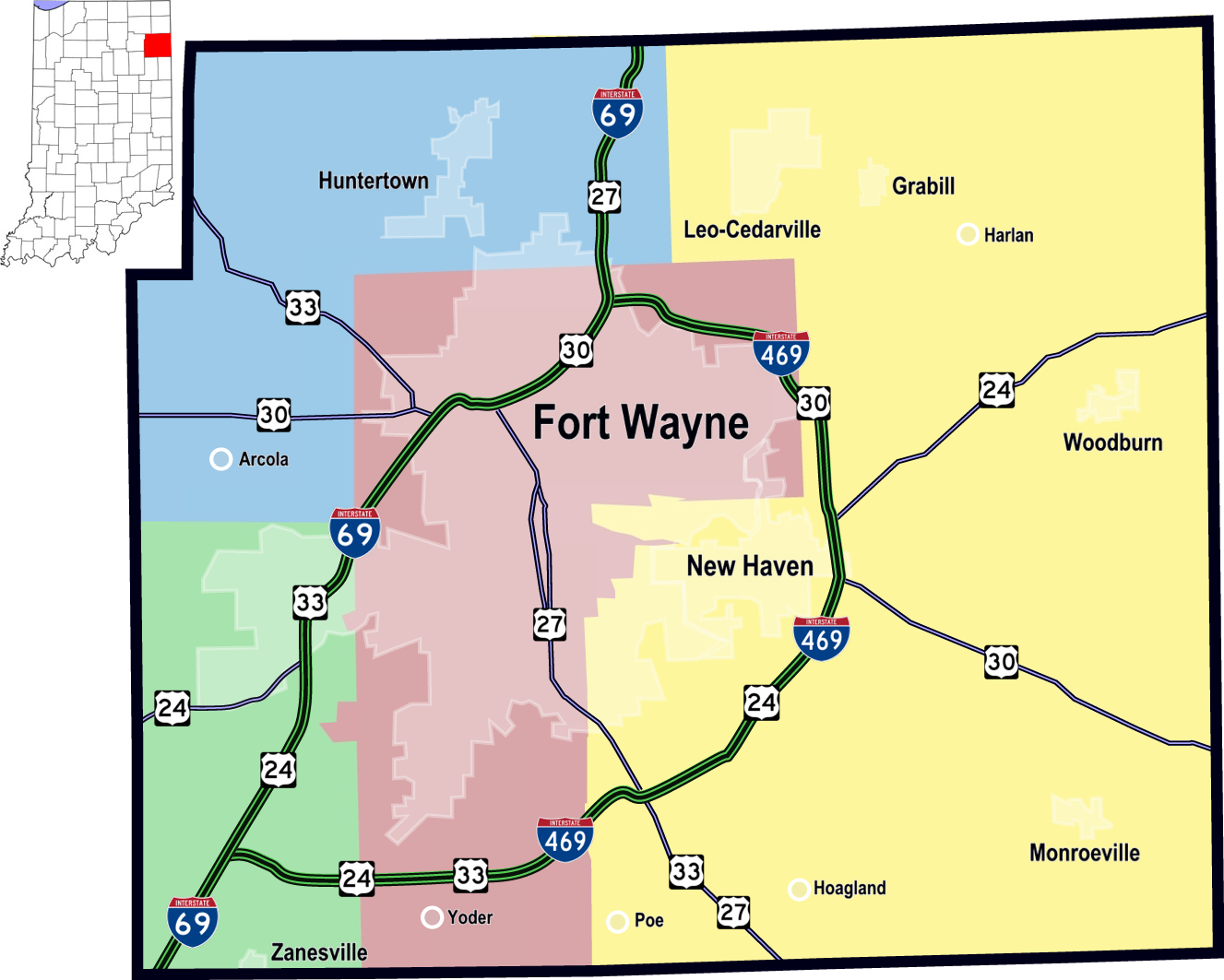
The blue-shaded area depicts the area in Allen County that includes the Northwest Allen County Schools district. Green is Southwest Allen County Schools; brown/purple Fort Wayne Community Schools; yellow East Allen County Schools

Northwest Allen County Schools is a public school district that serves Lake, Eel River, and Perry Townships in Allen County, Indiana. It is commonly referred to as NACS because of its respective initials.

== History ==
The school district was organized in 1965 by the virtue of the consolidation of Eel River-Perry Consolidated School and Lake Township School. The first school was Carroll High School, built in 1967.

== Governing ==
The schools are governed by a five-member non-partisan school board. Since the 1965 official organization of the district, there have only been a total of 27 board members serve a position. Members are elected at the time of the May primary in alternate years with one representative from each of the townships and two at-large representatives. The Board employs a superintendent of schools as its chief executive officer to administer its operational policies.

== Area served ==
The district includes all of Arcola and Huntertown as well as the northernmost parts of Fort Wayne, Indiana. It also includes rural Allen County residents who live near Churubusco.

This system consists of the schools:

- Arcola Elementary
- Cedar Canyon Elementary
- Hickory Center Elementary
- Huntertown Elementary
- Oak View Elementary
- Perry Hill Elementary
- Eel River Elementary
- Aspen Meadows Elementary
- Carroll Middle
- Maple Creek Middle
- Willow Creek Middle
- Carroll High School

== See also ==
- List of school districts in Indiana
