= Bishop Luers High School =

- Bishop Luers High School

Location
- 333 East Paulding Road; Fort Wayne, Indiana 46819; United States; 41.031626°N 85.134281°W

Information
- Type: Private, coeducational
- Motto: "We Are the Light of the World"
- Religious affiliation: Roman Catholic
- Established: 1958
- Oversight: Diocese of Fort Wayne-South Bend
- Principal: Seth Coffing
- Teaching staff: 40.9 (on an FTE basis)
- Grades: 9–12
- Enrollment: 553 (2024-2025)
- Student to teacher ratio: 11.8
- Color
- Athletics conference: Summit Athletic Conference
- Nickname: Knights
- Rival: Bishop Dwenger High School
- Accreditation: Lumen
- Newspaper: KnightTimes
- Yearbook: Accolade
- Tuition: Catholic Rate: $9,885 Non-Catholic Rate: $11,118
- Website: www.bishopluers.org

Bishop Luers High School is a Catholic school owned and operated by the Roman Catholic Diocese of Fort Wayne-South Bend. Bishop Luers is located on the south side of Fort Wayne, Indiana. The school was founded in 1958 by the Franciscan Fathers of the Saint John the Baptist Province in Cincinnati, Ohio, along with the Sisters of Saint Francis Province in Mishawaka, Indiana. The first bishop of the diocese, John Henry Luers, is the namesake of the school.

== Academics ==
Bishop Luers' education departments consist of Theology, Fine Arts, Business, English, Foreign Language, Mathematics, and Social Studies. In 2004 and in 2005, Bishop Luers was placed on the Catholic High School Honor Roll Top 50 Secondary Schools in America.

== Extra-curricular activities ==
Bishop Luers offers an array of activities for students. Activities include Academic Super Bowl, Book Club, Bowling, Chess Club, Catholic Intelligence Agency (CIA), Cheerleading, Freshman Mentoring, Future Business Leaders of America, Heather's Closet/Locker Room Leaders, Key Club, Knights for Life, National Honor Society (NHS), Newspaper, Pep Band, Philosophy Club, Show Choir, Spell Bowl, Student Ambassadors, Student Government, Theater, Ukulele Society, World Culture Club, and Yearbook.

== Performing Arts ==
Bishop Luers High School has a performing arts program, including the Minstrels Show Choir, Concert Choir, and Theater productions.

=== Programs offered ===
The Bishop Luers Knights field teams in 19 sanctioned sports and 6 non-sanctioned (club) sports. All sanctioned sports are governed by the Indiana High School Athletic Association (IHSAA). The lacrosse team is a member of the Indiana High School Lacrosse Association.

All sanctioned Bishop Luers teams compete in the Summit Athletic Conference (SAC).

In 2008, Bishop Luers became the first team in Indiana high school athletic history to win and hold the three major male sports titles (football, basketball, and baseball) in one year since 1973, the first year all three were recognized by the Indiana High School Athletic Association.

Sport	Sanctioned boys'	Sanctioned girls'	Non-sanctioned
Baseball	✓		
Basketball	✓	✓	
Bowling			✓
Cheerleading			✓
Cross country	✓	✓	
Football	✓		
Golf	✓	✓	
Soccer	✓	✓	
Softball		✓	
Swimming and diving	✓	✓	
Tennis	✓	✓	
Track and field	✓	✓	
Volleyball		✓	✓ (boys')
Wrestling	✓		

Luers' main rival is Bishop Dwenger High School, a Catholic school on the north side of Fort Wayne. Luers also has a spirited neighborhood rivalry with South Side High School, which is often termed "The Battle for Calhoun Street."

=== State championships ===
The Knights' athletic program has produced 21 team state champions in their history.

Year	Sport	Class	Coach	Opponent
1985-86	Football	2A	Steve Keefer	Lawrenceburg
1989-90	Football	2A	Matt Lindsay	Tri-West Hendricks
1992-93	Football	2A	Matt Lindsay	Westfield
1998-99	Basketball - girls'	2A	Gary Andrews	Austin
1999-00	Football	2A	Matt Lindsay	Danville
1999-00	Basketball - girls'	2A	Gary Andrews	Forest Park
2000-01	Basketball - girls'	2A	Gary Andrews	Shenandoah
2001-02	Football	2A	Matt Lindsay	Evansville Mater Dei
2001-02	Basketball - girls'	3A	Teri Rosinski	Gibson Southern
2002-03	Football	2A	Matt Lindsay	Southridge
2005-06	Basketball - girls'	3A	Teri Rosinski	Evansville Memorial
2007-08	Football	2A	Matt Lindsay	Heritage Christian
2007-08	Basketball - boys'	2A	James Blackmon Sr.	Winchester
2007-08	Baseball	2A	Gary Rogers	Elwood
2008-09	Basketball - boys'	2A	James Blackmon Sr.	Brownstown Central
2009-10	Football	2A	Matt Lindsay	Monrovia
2010-11	Football	2A	Matt Lindsay	North Putnam
2010-11	Basketball - girls'	2A	Denny Renier	Brownstown Central
2011-12	Football	2A	Matt Lindsay	Evansville Mater Dei
2012-13	Football	2A	Steve Keefer	Indianapolis Cardinal Ritter
2023-24	Football	2A	Kyle Lindsay	North Posey
2023-2024	Basketball - girls'	2A	Mark Pixley	Brownstown Central

=== Football ===
Bishop Luers has been to the Indiana state finals for football sixteen times, including four consecutive years, 1999 through 2002. Twelve of those sixteen trips have resulted in football championships, all in Class 2A, including four consecutive wins in 2009, 2010, 2011 and 2012.

The Knights' roster has included many players who have gone on to play successfully at the professional and NCAA Division I levels. Among the most notable are Anthony Spencer of the NFL's Dallas Cowboys and Jaylon Smith, winner of the 2012 high school Butkus Award and the 2012 Indiana Mr. Football award, are also alumni.

=== Boys' basketball ===
Coinciding with the 2004 hiring of head coach James Blackmon, Sr., recent seasons have seen championship success for the boys' basketball team. For the four seasons 2006/07 – 2009/10, the Knights' roster featured Deshaun Thomas, recipient of the 2010 Indiana Mr. Basketball award. The Knights won two consecutive boys' basketball Class 2A state championships, in 2008 and 2009.

On May 21, 2010, in a ceremony at Bishop Luers, Thomas' jersey (#1) was retired by the school. This was the first time in school history a jersey of any of its athletes had been retired.

=== Girls' basketball ===
The girls' basketball team won three consecutive Indiana State Class 2A Championship games, in the 1998/99, 1999/2000, and 2000/01 seasons. The following season the team moved up a class, winning a fourth consecutive state title, in Class 3A, in 2001/02. The Knights also won the 2005/06 Class 3A championship.

The Knights' six state championships currently stand as the most all-time by one school in Indiana girls' basketball history, as do the nine championship game appearances.

=== Baseball ===
In 2008, the boys' baseball team competed for the first time in the state baseball championship, winning the 2A title.

== Notable alumni ==
- Thomas Hammock (1999), head coach of Northern Illinois University football team
- Angie Akers (née Harris), beach volleyball player, (Association of Volleyball Professionals), Notre Dame
- Kevin Kiermaier (2008), professional baseball player, Toronto Blue Jays of MLB
- Zach Klein, co-founder of video social networking site Vimeo
- Austin Mack (2016), NFL and CFL player
- Jaylon Smith (2013), football player, middle linebacker for New Orleans Saints
- Anthony Spencer (2002), football player, outside linebacker for Dallas Cowboys
- Deshaun Thomas (2010), basketball player

== See also ==
- List of high schools in Indiana
- Summit Athletic Conference (IHSAA)
