= South Side High School (Fort Wayne, Indiana) =

Public high school in Fort Wayne, Indiana, U.S.

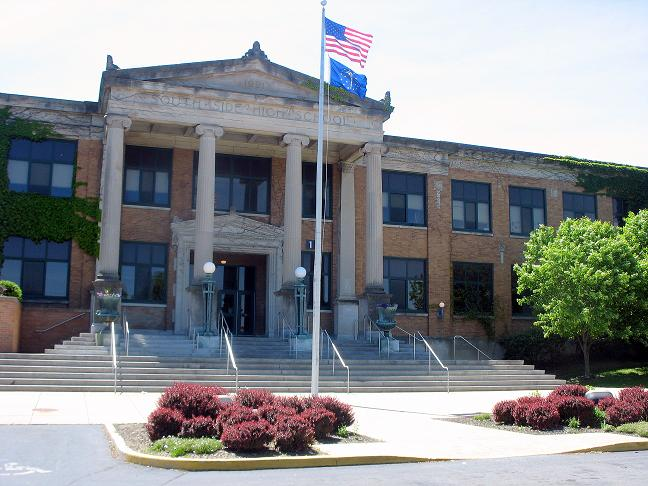

Location
- 3601 South Calhoun Street; Fort Wayne, Indiana; United States; 41°3′10.6″N 85°8′10.6″W

Information
- Type: Public, Secondary
- Established: 1922
- Locale: Urban
- Oversight: Fort Wayne Community Schools
- Principal: Zachary Harl
- Faculty: 95.33 (on an FTE basis)
- Grades: 9–12
- Enrollment: 1,405 (2024–2025)
- Student to teacher ratio: 14.74
- Color
- Athletics: Summit Athletic Conference
- Mascot: Archer
- Newspaper: The Arrow
- Website: southside.fortwayneschools.org

South Side High School is a Fort Wayne Community Schools high school situated in south-central Fort Wayne, Allen County, Indiana, United States.

== History ==
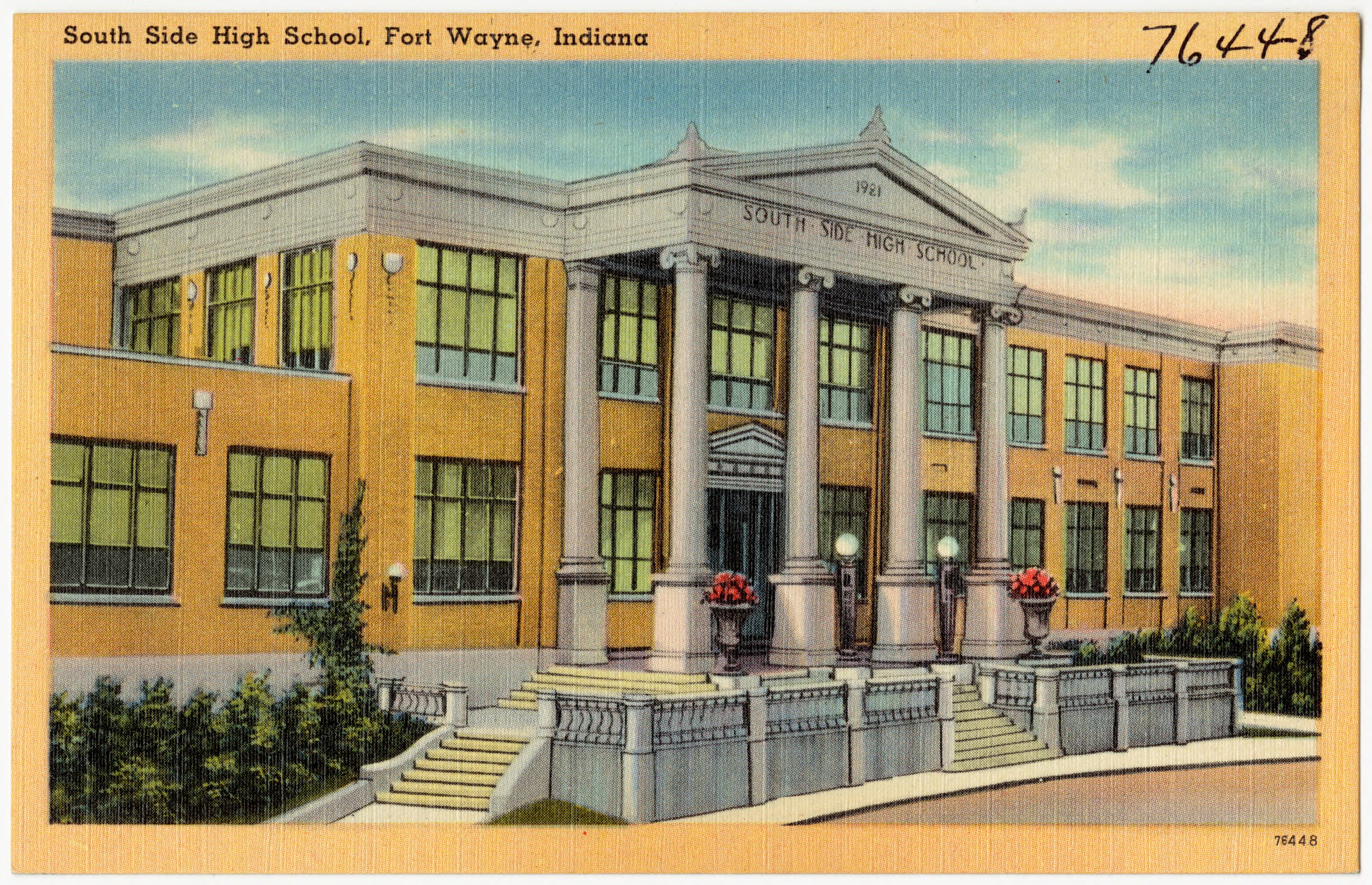
A postcard depicting South Side, circa 1930–1945

On September 11, 1922, South Side High School opened its doors to students for the first time. The idea of a second high school in the city of Fort Wayne became a reality in 1920 when Fort Wayne High School, later known as Central High School, became overcrowded. As a site for the new high school, the school board chose a tract of land on South Calhoun Street close to the city limits. The land on which the school was constructed had been used for gardens by residents. The land that the football field was constructed was rather flat. This site had previously been occupied by the Kaylor Brickyard.

When South Side High School opened its doors, classes were primarily held in the south part of the building because the north section, particularly in the area of the Gymnasium, had not yet been completed. To further complications, the approximate 800 high school students shared the building with 510 grade school students. The South Side Grade School continued to be part of the facility until the fall of 1925 when Harrison Hill Elementary School opened.

When South Side High School first opened, desks and other furnishings had not been delivered to classrooms. As a result, students frequently had to sit on nail kegs. Because construction was not completed, half-day sessions were held for several weeks until October 30, 1922, when the first full-day session took place.

At the time South Side opened, it was the largest one-story school building in the United States. The building itself covered 3 acres (12,000 m^{2}) and the normal capacity was 1,500 students. It was also one of the first school building in the nation to use a series of ramps instead of stairs.

As the school population increased, additions to the original structure were made in the late 1930s, the late 1950s and in 1970–1973. The 1970–73 addition included several classrooms, a new media center and a new auditorium. A new physical education facility was completed in January 1981, and recently South Side has completed a 39.5 million dollar renovation which includes Fort Wayne's only Olympic-sized swimming pool. South Side is now an academic gem in the FWCS crown.

South Side High School has been for over 60 years a member of the North Central Association of Colleges and Secondary Schools and is a Special First-Class Commissioned High School by order of the Indiana State Department of Public Instruction. In the spring of 2000, South Side received full accreditation in the Performance Based Accreditation system of the Department of Education.

From 1963 to 1966, from 1968 to 1974 and again from 1976 to the present, South Side has been privileged to be a member of the prestigious College Entrance Examination Board of New York City which serves the colleges and secondary schools of the nation. In 1982, South Side was elected to permanent membership in the College Board – one of only thirteen Indiana high schools at that time to be so honored.

Seven principals have served the school in the past: Robert Harris, 1922–1926; R. Nelson Snider, 1926–1963; Jack E. Weicker, 1963–1990; Jennifer Manth, 1990–2001; Thomas Smith, 2001–2010; Carlton Mable, 2010–2018; and Adam Swinford, 2018–2022. Zachary Harl currently serves as the principal of South Side. Ninety-five individual staff members have served the school for twenty-five years or longer.

The school is noted for its Burmese population.

== Athletics ==
South Side's athletic teams are the Archers and the school colors are green and white. The Archers have won 7 state championships. The school's main rivals are North Side High School and Bishop Luers High School.

IHSAA State Championships
Sport	Year(s)
Boys Basketball (2)	1938, 1958
Boys Track (1)	1968
Girls Track (4)	1980, 1985, 1986, 1989

== Notable alumni ==
- Julia Barr, actress, All My Children
- DaMarcus Beasley, professional soccer player
- Jamar Beasley, professional soccer player
- Bill Blass, fashion designer
- Willis Carto, far-right activist
- Ralph Hamilton, basketball player
- Steve Hargan, MLB pitcher
- Edward H. Kruse, former member of the U.S. House of Representatives
- Suzanne Stiver Lie, American-Norwegian sociologist
- Shelley Long, actress, star of television series Cheers and films
- Willie Long, 1967 Indiana Mr. Basketball, ABA player
- Walker "Bud" Mahurin, World War II fighter ace
- Alfred Moellering, United States Attorney for the Northern District of Indiana
- Winfield Moses, 31st mayor of Fort Wayne and former member of the Indiana House of Representatives
- DeDee Nathan, American heptathlete
- Bernard Pollard, safety for NFL's Tennessee Titans
- Cherrish Pryor, member of the Indiana House of Representatives
- George E. Schafer, lieutenant general in the United States Air Force
- Lamar Smith, former professional football player
- Nancy Snyderman, physician, radio and television personality
- Allen Steere, physician, discovered Lyme Disease

== See also ==
- List of high schools in Indiana
