= R. Nelson Snider High School =

Public high school in Fort Wayne, Indiana, U.S.

Coordinates: 41°6′31.5″N 85°4′59.09″W

- 4600 Fairlawn Pass, Fort Wayne, Indiana; United States

Information
- Type: Free public
- Motto: "Nihil Sine Magno Labore" (Latin; "Nothing Without Great Effort")
- Established: 1964
- School district: Fort Wayne Community Schools
- Principal: Chad Hissong
- Teaching staff: 109.83 (FTE)
- Grades: 9-12
- Enrollment: 1,927 (2024–2025)
- Student to teacher ratio: 17.55
- Campus size: 10 acres (40,000 m^{2})
- Campus type: Suburban
- Colors: Gold and black
- Mascot: Panther
- Website: snider.fortwayneschools.org

R. Nelson Snider High School is a secondary school in the Fort Wayne Community Schools system, serving the north central and northeast neighborhoods of Fort Wayne, Indiana, United States.

A small portion of New Haven is zoned to Snider.

== Athletics ==
All athletic teams compete in the Summit Athletic Conference.

=== Team state champions ===
- Boys' baseball:
  - Class 4A - 2008/09, 2005/06
- Girls' basketball:
  - 1987/88
- Boys' football:
  - Class 5A - 1992/93, 2015/2016, 2023/2024
- Boys' track and field:
  - 1973/74 (co-champions)
- Girls' volleyball:
  - 1991/92, 1987/88

== Speech and debate ==
Snider's speech club is a chapter of the National Forensic League, the Indiana High School Forensic Association, and actively participates in its events.

== Notable alumni ==
- Jessie Bates III professional football player, Atlanta Falcons
- Vaughn Dunbar, former professional football player, NFL, New Orleans Saints
- Tiffany Gooden, former professional basketball player, Colorado Xplosion
- Mac Hippenhammer, professional football player
- Kobi Libii, comedian
- Bam Martin-Scott, professional football player
- Andy Replogle, former professional baseball player, Milwaukee Brewers
- Matt Vogel, swimmer, Olympic gold medalist, 1976 Summer Olympics
- Sharon Wichman, swimmer, Olympic gold medalist, 1968 Summer Olympics
- Rod Woodson, former professional football player, Pro Football Hall of Famer

== See also ==
- List of high schools in Indiana
- Summit Athletic Conference
