= George E. Schafer =

American general (1922–2015)

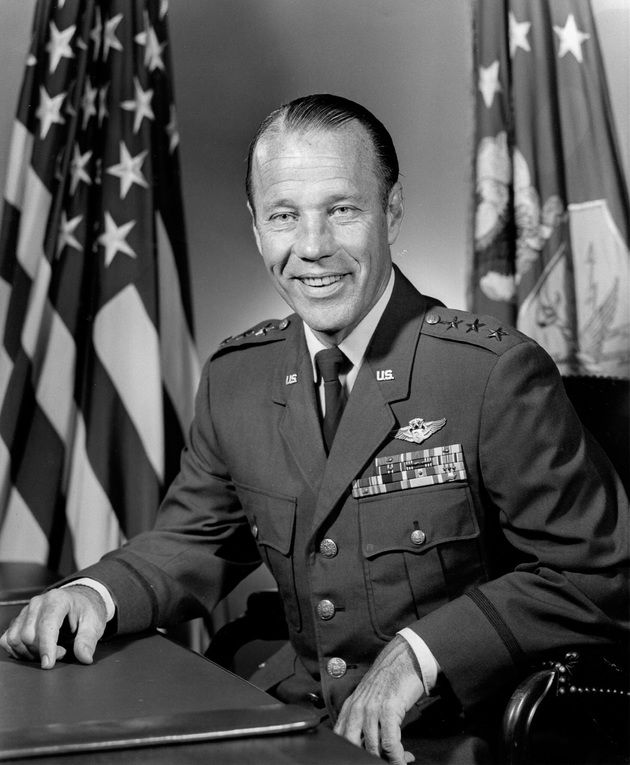
- Born: August 9, 1922; Cincinnati, Ohio, United States
- Died: January 23, 2015 (aged 92); San Antonio, Texas, United States
- Military career
- Allegiance: United States of America
- Branch: United States Air Force
- Service years: 1947–1978
- Rank: Lieutenant General
- Awards: Distinguished Service Medal; Legion of Merit with oak leaf cluster Air Medal; Air Force Commendation Medal with oak leaf cluster Good Conduct Medal; Korean order of National Security Merit; Guk Seon Medal; Republic of Vietnam Gallantry Cross; Republic of Vietnam Honor; Aeronaut Command Wing Medal Award; Vietnam Service Medal with three service stars Republic of Vietnam Campaign Medal.

George E. Schafer (August 9, 1922 – January 23, 2015) was a lieutenant general in the United States Air Force who served as surgeon general of the United States Air Force from 1975 to 1978.

== Biography ==
Schafer was born in Cincinnati, Ohio, in 1922, graduated from South Side High School, Fort Wayne, Indiana, in 1940 and attended the University of Cincinnati, Ohio, where he received his bachelor of science degree from the College of Liberal Arts in 1943, and his doctor of medicine degree from the College of Medicine in 1946. He served his internship at St. Joseph's Hospital, Fort Wayne, Indiana, 1946–1947 and completed three months of surgical residency before entering military service in the United States Air Force on July 5, 1947. He was assigned to the USAF School of Aviation Medicine, Randolph Field, Texas, where he completed the Aviation Medical Examiners course in September 1947 and the Aviation Physiologists course in November 1947. Schafer then was assigned as flight surgeon, 4th Fighter Group, at Andrews Air Force Base, Md. During this assignment, he completed the three-months cold weather test with the 4th Group in Alaska in 1948.

In March 1949 he was assigned to the Office of the Surgeon, Headquarters Air Training Command, at Barksdale Air Force Base, as chief, Aviation Physiology Branch. In August 1950 he became chief, Aviation Medicine Division at ATC Headquarters, which had moved to Scott Air Force Base, Illinois. From August 1952 to August 1956, Schafer served overseas. First he was chief, Aviation Medicine Division, Office of the Surgeon, Headquarters U.S. Air Forces in Europe, Wiesbaden, Germany. In September 1954 he became commander, 7330th USAF Hospital, Furstenfeldbruck Air Base, Germany, and surgeon, Headquarters Air Training Command (Provisional). Schafer returned to the United States in August 1956 and attended the Public Health and Preventive Medicine Course at the National Naval Medical Center, Bethesda, Maryland. In January 1957 he was assigned as Commander, USAF Hospital, Davis-Monthan Air Force Base, Arizona. He attended the Air War College at Maxwell Air Force Base, Alabama, from August 1961 to June 1962 and was selected as one of the outstanding graduates.

From July 1962 to January 1969 Schafer was at Brooks Air Force Base, Texas. He served first as assistant deputy chief of staff, research and development, and then as deputy chief of staff for operations in Headquarters Aerospace Medical Division. In November 1964 he became vice commander of the U.S. Air Force School of Aerospace Medicine. In October 1965 he was appointed vice commander of the Aerospace Medical Division, and in July 1967 he assumed duties as commander of the U.S. Air Force School of Aerospace Medicine.

On November 21, 1963, Schafer and Colonel John E. Pickering co-wrote the technical portions of John F. Kennedy’s "Cap over the Wall" speech. Kennedy visited Brooks Air Force Base to dedicate the Aerospace Medical Center. This was President Kennedy's last official act as President, before his assassination the next day.

Schafer went to the Republic of Vietnam in January 1969 and served as surgeon for the 7th Air Force at Tan Son Nhut Airfield. He returned to the United States in February 1970 and was assigned as deputy command surgeon for Military Airlift Command, with headquarters at Scott Air Force Base, Illinois. In February 1971 he returned to Brooks Air Force Base for duty as commander of the Aerospace Medical Division, AFSC. In April 1975 Schafer assumed duties as deputy surgeon general, U.S. Air Force, a position he held until August 1975 when he became surgeon general.

Schafer is president of the Association of Military Surgeons of the United States, a past president of the Aerospace Medical Association and a fellow in Aviation Medicine, a past president of the Society of USAF Flight Surgeons, and a member of the American Medical Association and the American College of Preventive Medicine. Schafer is board certified in Aerospace Medicine by the American Board of Preventive Medicine. He is the author of several professional publications in the field of aerospace medicine. He was the first flight surgeon to be assigned full-time to a jet organization, the 4th Fighter Group and, in this capacity, reported to the National Research Council on medical operational problems of such flying. Schafer is rated as a chief flight surgeon. His military decorations and awards include the Distinguished Service Medal, Legion of Merit with oak leaf cluster, Air Medal, Air Force Commendation Medal with oak leaf cluster, Good Conduct Medal, Korean order of National Security Merit Guk Seon Medal, Republic of Vietnam Gallantry Cross, the Republic of Vietnam Honor Aeronaut Command Wing Medal Award, Vietnam Service Medal with three service stars, and the Republic of Vietnam Campaign Medal. He was promoted to the grade of lieutenant general on August 1, 1975, with same date of rank. He retired on August 1, 1978.
