= Wayne High School (Indiana) =

Public high school in Fort Wayne, Indiana, U.S.

Location
- 9100 Winchester Road, Fort Wayne, Indiana, United States; 41°0′3″N 85°8′23″W

Information
- Type: Public, secondary
- Established: 1971
- School district: Fort Wayne Community Schools
- Principal: Emily Oberlin
- Staff: 91.58 (on an FTE basis)
- Enrollment: 1,398 (2024–2025)
- Student to teacher ratio: 15.27
- Color
- Athletics conference: Summit Athletic Conference
- Nickname: Generals
- Yearbook: Sentry
- Website: wayne.fortwayneschools.org

Wayne High School is a public high school in Fort Wayne Community Schools, located in the southern suburbs of Fort Wayne, Indiana, United States.

== History ==
The school terminated two employees in March 2015 in separate incidents. One of these staffers was arrested after students made claims he had a threesome with them in his classroom. The teacher would later plead guilty to child seduction.

== Notable alumni ==
- Joe Andrew, National Chairman of the Democratic National Committee (DNC) from 1999–2001
- Jason Baker, professional football punter, NFL Carolina Panthers
- Roosevelt Barnes, former professional football player, NFL Detroit Lions
- Molly Hagan, actress
- Michael Derrick Hudson (Class of 1982), poet and librarian who came under fire for using the Chinese female pseudonym Yi-Fen Chou (allegedly the name of a classmate at WHS)
- Chuck Surack, entrepreneur, philanthropist, and musician; founder of Sweetwater Sound
- Craig Young, NFL linebacker for the Indianapolis Colts, played college football for the Ohio State Buckeyes and the Kansas Jayhawks

== See also ==
- List of high schools in Indiana
