= Elmhurst High School =

Former public high school in Fort Wayne, Indiana, U.S.

Coordinates: 41°1′49.63″N 85°11′27.18″W

- 3829 Sandpoint Road, Fort Wayne, Indiana; United States

Information
- Type: Public
- Established: 1929
- Status: Closed
- Closed: 2010
- Oversight: Fort Wayne Community Schools
- Colors: Red and Gray
- Athletics conference: Summit Athletic Conference
- Mascot: Trojan
- Website: http://elmhursthighschool.org

Elmhurst High School was a public high school with a comprehensive intake and over 1,000 students. Elmhurst High School was a part of the Fort Wayne Community Schools school district, serving those living in the Waynedale area of Fort Wayne. It received accreditation from the Indiana Department of Education and the North Central Association of Colleges and Secondary Schools.

== Closing Elmhurst High School ==
On March 22, 2010, a vote was taken by the FWCS School Board to accept a recommendation of the FWCS administration regarding ways to reduce the 2010 district budget by $15 million. The administration's report included the step of closing Elmhurst High School. The budget moves were required because current economic conditions reduced federal and state funds available to the school district. The closing of Elmhurst has been a highly debated topic over the past several years, and the Board, by a unanimous vote of 7–0, agreed to accept the administration's recommendation. With that action, the 2009/10 school year was the final year of operations for the school. Returning students were reallocated to other high schools in the FWCS system.

== Mission ==
The mission of Elmhurst High School was to guarantee that all students were prepared to meet or exceed Indiana Standards by narrowing the achievement gap, by increasing the successful completion of advanced courses, and by improving student achievement.

== History ==
Dating back to 1929, Elmhurst High School had nine principals, including three female principals.

In 1979, Elmhurst High School underwent drastic renovations in order to better serve its students. The renovations were very costly and took a long time to complete but when they were finally finished, Elmhurst was equipped with an auxiliary gym and 600-seat auditorium. The auditorium was designed to double as a movie theater, with the use of a 20'x20' retractable movie screen to be installed after the construction of the auditorium.

The school has also had a rich tradition of musicians. Annually, the school hosted an ISSMA Jazz Fest. Back in the era of jazz, there were many big names who came to perform at Elmhurst. Among them were: Stan Kenton, Woody Herman, the Duke Ellington Orchestra, Maynard Ferguson, and many others. The school also had many college bands perform there as well. Along the band room wall, you could see various posters dating back to when the tickets were on sale.

== Sports and clubs ==
Elmhurst's athletic department consisted of more than 20 IHSAA sports including the following for both boys and girls: cross-country, soccer, tennis, basketball, marching band, track and field, swim and dive, bowling, and golf. Football, wrestling, and baseball were also offered for boys, while softball, volleyball, gymnastics, and cheerleading were offered for girls. All sanctioned sports competed in the Summit Athletic Conference. In its final year, the Elmhurst Boys' Basketball team won the 3A Regional title. In 2010 the Elmhurst robotics team won both the state and world championships competing against students from Countries including Canada, Korea, and China.

On March 7, 2009, the Elmhurst Girls' Basketball team brought home the first state championship for any team sport in the school's history, defeating Owen Valley 62–59 to win the Class 3A title.

On August 21, 2009, the football team won their first game since the '04 campaign under head coach Kyle Beauchamp in their final year before shutting their doors, defeating Ft. Wayne Northrop 21–13.

== Notable alumni ==
- David Abbott, member of the Indiana House of Representatives
- James Hardy, NFL player for the Buffalo Bills
- Tera Klutz, accountant and Indiana state auditor
- June Peppas, first basewoman and pitcher in the All-American Girls Professional Baseball League (1948–1954)
- David C. Turnley, Pulitzer Prize-winning photojournalist
- Peter Turnley, photojournalist
- David Fieldhouse business man
