= James Hardy (wide receiver) =

American football player (1985–2017)

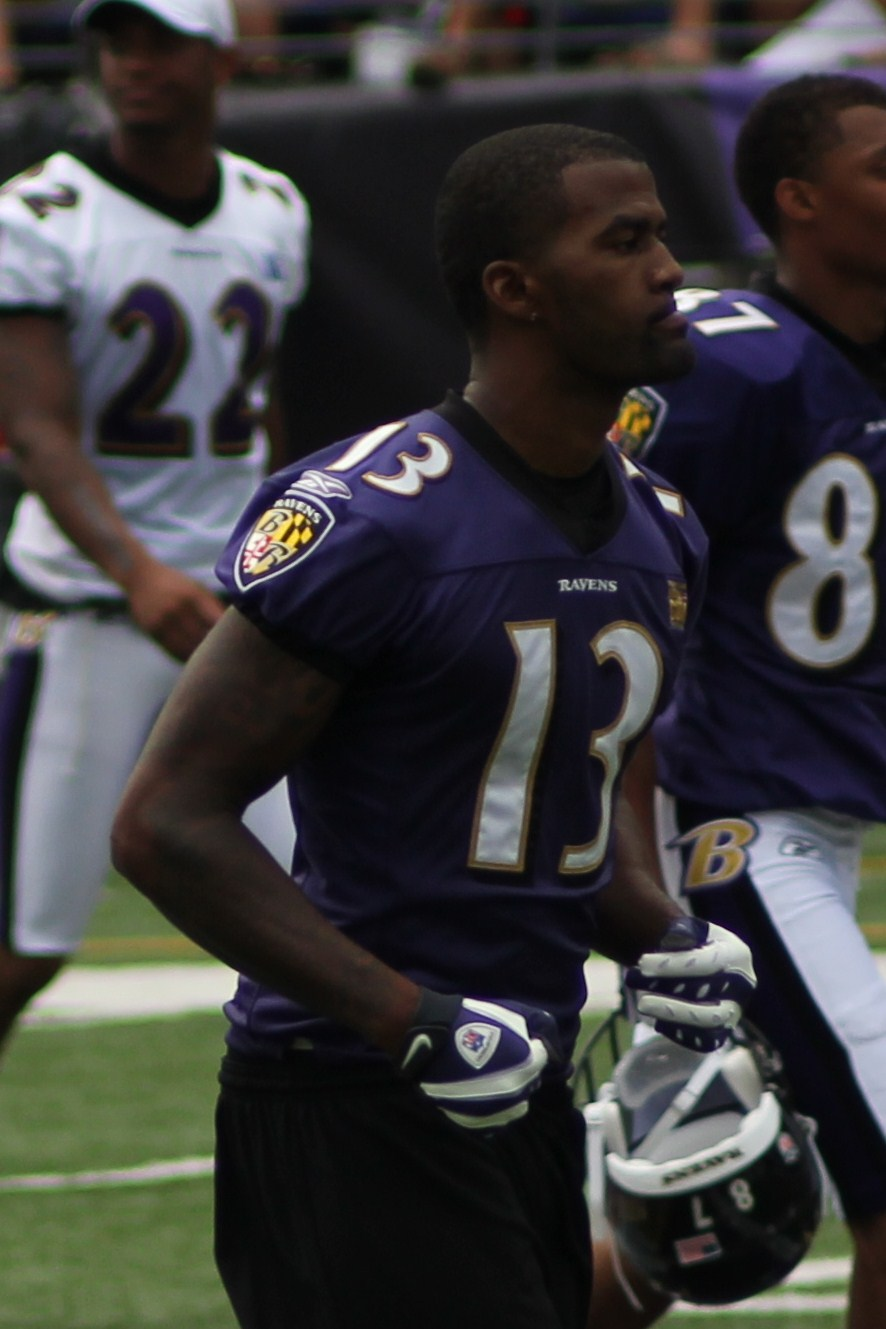
- Hardy with the Baltimore Ravens in 2011

No. 81, 84, 13
- Position: Wide receiver

Personal information
- Born: December 24, 1985; Fort Wayne, Indiana, U.S.
- Died: c. June 7, 2017 (aged 31); Fort Wayne, Indiana, U.S.
- Listed height: 6 ft 5 in (1.96 m)
- Listed weight: 220 lb (100 kg)

Career information
- High school: Elmhurst (Fort Wayne)
- College: Indiana (2004–2007)
- NFL draft: 2008: 2nd round, 41st overall pick

Career history
- Buffalo Bills (2008–2010); Baltimore Ravens (2011)*; Arizona Rattlers (2012)*; Tampa Bay Storm (2013)*
- * Offseason or practice squad member only

Awards and highlights
- Second-team All-American (2007); Freshman All-American (2005); First-team All-Big Ten (2007); 2× Second-team All-Big Ten (2005, 2006)

Career NFL statistics
- Receptions: 10
- Receiving yards: 96
- Receiving touchdowns: 2
- Stats at Pro Football Reference

James W. Hardy III (December 24, 1985 – c. June 7, 2017) was an American professional football player who was a wide receiver in the National Football League (NFL). He was selected by the Buffalo Bills in the second round of the 2008 NFL draft and also played for the Baltimore Ravens. He played college football for the Indiana Hoosiers.

== Early life ==
James Hardy was born and raised in Fort Wayne, Indiana.

He attended Elmhurst High School where he was a star athlete in football and basketball. He received an athletic scholarship for football at Indiana University.

At Elmhurst High School in Fort Wayne, Indiana, Hardy played football and basketball. As a senior, he posted 34 catches for 710 yards and 10 touchdowns and was a Class 4A all-state selection by the Indiana Football Coaches Association.

As a basketball player, he was runner-up in the Indiana "Mr. Basketball" award voting and an Indiana All-Star. He ranks high on the list for the city scoring record for Fort Wayne, with over 2,000 points during his four years at Elmhurst. Hardy led Elmhurst to a state championship appearance his junior year. However, Elmhurst was defeated by Bishop Chatard High School from Indianapolis. His senior year, he led Elmhurst to a sectional championship, but later was defeated by Bellmont High School in the regional finals.

Hardy was also a two-time winner of the Tiffany Gooden Award, awarded annually to the most outstanding male or female basketball player in the SAC.

== College career ==
Hardy redshirted as a true freshman in 2004. As a redshirt freshman in 2005, he posted 61 catches for 893 yards and 10 touchdowns. His play earned him a Freshman All-American selection.

As a sophomore, he caught 51 passes for 722 yards and 10 touchdowns and was named Second-team All-Big Ten for a second straight year. His 20 career receiving touchdowns in his first two years had tied him with Ernie Jones (1984–1987) for second on the university's all-time list, trailing only Jade Butcher (1967–1969) and his 30 career TD grabs.

As a junior, Hardy caught 74 passes for 1,075 yards—ranking third in the Big Ten in both categories—and became the Hoosiers' all-time receiving leader in touchdowns (36), yards (2,690) and receptions (186). He was selected first-team All-Big Ten selection, a Fred Biletnikoff Award semifinalist and the team's most valuable player.

During his time at Indiana, Hardy also played on the basketball team for one season.

In January 2008, Hardy declared himself eligible for the 2008 NFL draft, saying "I have reached the pinnacle of my college football career."

== Professional career ==
=== Pre-draft ===
Pre-draft measurables
Height	Weight	Arm length	Hand span	40-yard dash	10-yard split	20-yard split	20-yard shuttle	Three-cone drill	Vertical jump	Broad jump	Bench press
6 ft 5 3/8 in (1.97 m)	217 lb (98 kg)	35 1/2 in (0.90 m)	10 1/4 in (0.26 m)	4.49 s	1.56 s	2.58 s	4.20 s	6.84 s	37.0 in (0.94 m)	10 ft 5 in (3.18 m)	18 reps
All values from NFL Combine/Pro Day

At the NFL Scouting Combine, Hardy was a top 10 performer in the bench press, broad jump, 3-cone drill, and 20-yard shuttle. In the bench press, Hardy finished ninth among wide receivers with 18 reps at 225 lb (102 kg). He finished 8th in the broad jump with a distance of 10 ft 5 in (3.18 metres). He finished 7th in the 3-cone drill with a time of 6.84 seconds. He also finished tied for seventh in the 20-yard shuttle with a time of 4.20 seconds.

=== Buffalo Bills ===
Hardy was selected by the Buffalo Bills in the second round (41st overall) of the 2008 NFL draft. He signed a multi-year contract with the team on July 24. On September 14, 2008, in his second game, Hardy caught his first touchdown late in a win against the Jacksonville Jaguars. He finished the campaign with nine catches for 87 yards and two touchdowns.

Hardy played in two games in 2009, catching one pass for nine yards. On September 4, 2010, he was released by the Bills.

=== Baltimore Ravens ===
On January 17, 2011, Hardy was signed to a reserve/future contract by the Baltimore Ravens. He practiced little with the Ravens during the 2011 training camp due to chronic hamstring problems, the same injury that nagged him while with the Bills. He was released by the Ravens on September 5, 2011.

== Post-football career ==
After the NFL, Hardy turned his attention to Hollywood, where he pursued a career in modeling and acting.

== Personal problems and death ==
On May 4, 2014, Hardy was arrested on felony charges following a dispute at his home in Los Angeles, in which a visibly drugged Hardy attacked police officers responding to a disturbing the peace call. In November 2014, it was reported a judge deemed Hardy unfit for trial and remanded him to a mental facility.

On June 7, 2017, Hardy's body was found lodged in a dam in the Maumee River in Fort Wayne, Indiana. He was 31 years old. On July 18, his death was ruled a suicide, by way of asphyxia from drowning.
