= Walter Jordan =

American basketball player (born 1956)

Personal information
- Born: February 19, 1956 (age 70) Perry, Alabama, U.S.
- Listed height: 6 ft 7 in (2.01 m)
- Listed weight: 198 lb (90 kg)

Career information
- High school: Northrop (Fort Wayne, Indiana)
- College: Purdue (1974–1978)
- NBA draft: 1978: 4th round, 84th overall pick
- Drafted by: New Jersey Nets
- Playing career: 1978–1986
- Position: Small forward
- Number: 40

Career history
- 1978–1979: Washington Lumberjacks
- 1979–1980: Utica Olympics
- 1980: Hawaii Volcanos
- 1980–1981: Cleveland Cavaliers
- 1981–1982: Montana Golden Nuggets
- 1982–1983: Miñón Valladolid
- 1983: Joventut Badalona
- 1983–1984: Detroit Spirits
- 1984–1985: Toronto Tornados
- 1985–1986: Albany Patroons
- Stats at NBA.com
- Stats at Basketball Reference

Walter Lee Jordan (born February 19, 1956) is an American former professional basketball player. A 6'7" small forward born in Perry, Alabama and from Purdue University, Jordan played one season (1980–81) with the Cleveland Cavaliers of the NBA. He scored 68 points and grabbed 42 rebounds in 30 games.

== High school years ==
Jordan led Northrop High School, in (Fort Wayne, Indiana), to the single-class 1974 Indiana state basketball championship, coached by Robert Dille.

He was named to "Top 50″ All-time Northeast Indiana's Athletes of the Century and was inducted into Afro-American Hall of Fame in Fort Wayne. He was also named by the Indiana Basketball Hall of Fame as a member of the 1999 Silver Anniversary Team, and inducted into the Hall in 2003.

== College career ==
Jordan was a major star at Purdue University from 1975 through 1978. He was a two-time team MVP, three-time All-Big Ten and two time 1st Team All-Big Ten. He led the team in scoring three years, led the team in rebounding two years, and ended with a career average of 17 points a game, ranking him 6th (1,813 ppg) on Purdue's career scoring history. He is also Purdue's 3rd all-time rebounder, with 882 rebounds.

He was a member of the 1977 gold medal-winning World University Games team which also featured Larry Bird, Sidney Moncrief, Darrell Griffith, Dave Corzine, Calvin Natt and Freeman Williams.

== Professional career ==
In addition to his NBA season, Jordan played in the Spanish League for two seasons; the CBA for five seasons; and the WBA for one season. He was named 1st Team, All-WBA for the 1978–79 season.

== Current activities ==
Currently, Jordan lives in Atlanta where he is Executive Director/coach of Team Impact, Inc., an amateur youth basketball program.

== Career statistics ==
Legend
GP	Games played	GS	Games started	MPG	Minutes per game
FG%	Field goal percentage	3P%	3-point field goal percentage	FT%	Free throw percentage
RPG	Rebounds per game	APG	Assists per game	SPG	Steals per game
BPG	Blocks per game	PPG	Points per game	**Bold**	Career high

=== NBA ===
==== Regular season ====
Year	Team	GP	MPG	FG%	3P%	FT%	RPG	APG	SPG	BPG	PPG
1980–81	Cleveland	30	6.9	.387	–	.588	1.4	.4	.4	.2	2.3
