= Fort Wayne Community Schools =

Public school district in Fort Wayne, Indiana

Coordinates: 41°04′27.8″N 85°08′16.6″W

Fort Wayne Community Schools (FWCS)

Location
- 1200 S Clinton Street; Fort Wayne, Indiana Allen County

District information
- Type: Public
- Motto: We Are Your Schools
- Grades: K-12
- Superintendent: Dr. Mark Daniel

Students and staff
- Students: 28,629
- Teachers: 1,883
- Staff: 4,003
- Athletic conference: Summit
- District mascot: North Side Legends; Northrop Bruins; Snider Panthers; South Side Archers; Wayne Generals

Other information
- 2011 Graduation Rate: 86%
- 2023 Graduates: 1,898
- Website: Official website

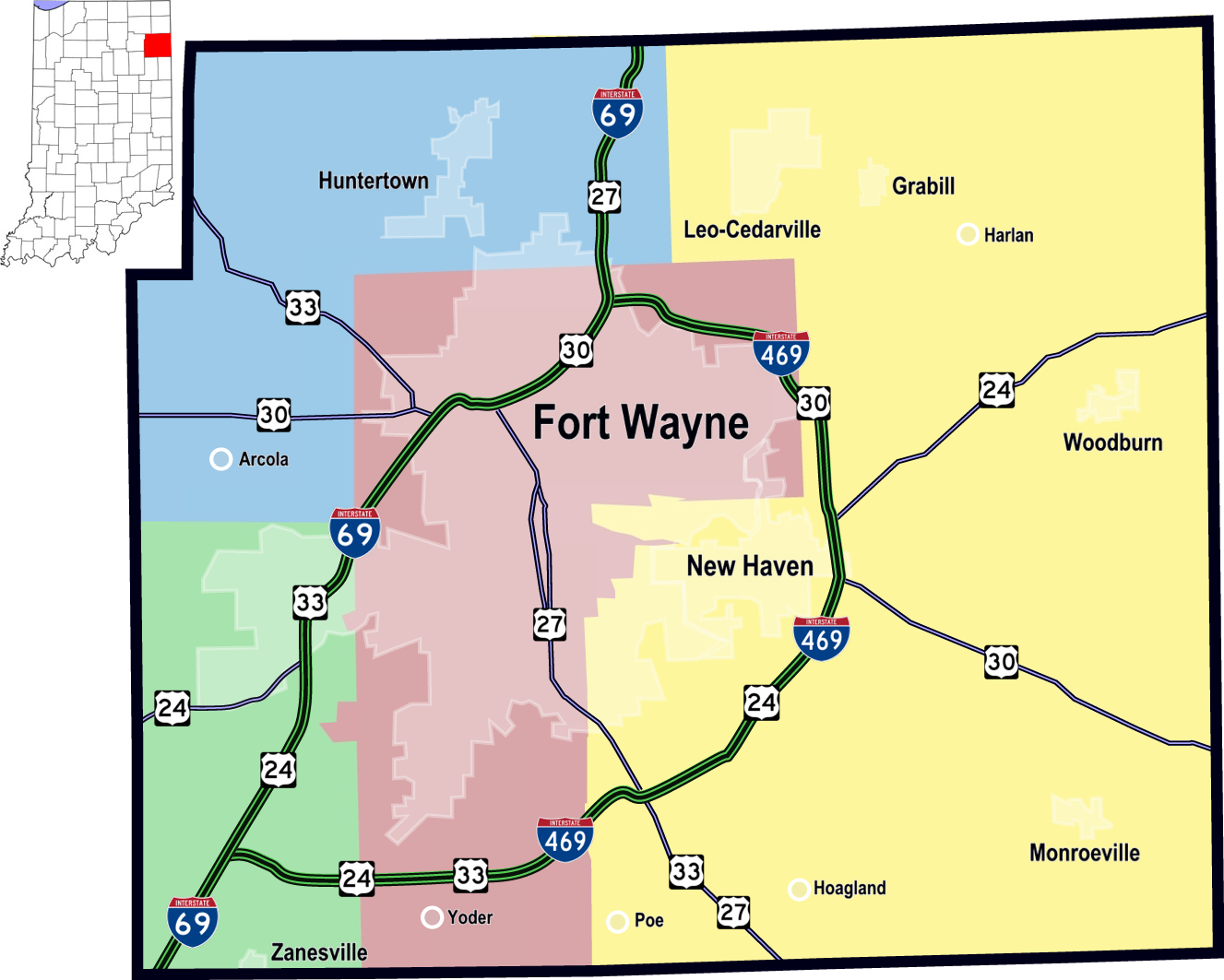
Map of the Allen County School Districts

Location of Indiana within the United States

Fort Wayne Community Schools (FWCS) is the Fort Wayne, Indiana area public school district, and is the largest in Indiana. The second largest is the Indianapolis Public Schools. It operates five high schools, ten middle schools, one intermediate school (grades 1–8) and over thirty elementary schools, serving 30,992 students (nearly 3% of Indiana's K–12 population) in 2012–2013. FWCS's current superintendent is Dr. Mark Daniel. FWCS is divided into several departments, including Technology, Transportation, Academic Services, Continuing Education, Nutrition Services, and Public Affairs.

== Boundary ==
The district's boundary includes St. Joseph, Washington, and Wayne townships, as well as a block of Adams Township. The majority of Fort Wayne and a small section of New Haven are this district.

== School Board ==
The FWCS Board of School Trustees serves as the district's governing and fiscal body, and its meetings are open to the public in the Grile Administrative Center in downtown Fort Wayne and broadcast on local cable channels, Comcast 54 and FiOS/Frontier 24. The School Board approves the FWCS tax rate and any borrowing that will be paid off by property taxes.

Current FWCS board members include Steve Corona, Anne Duff, Julie Hollingsworth, Rohli Booker, Jennifer Matthias, Maria Norman and Noah Smith. Board of School Trustees

=== Property tax remonstrace ===
On April 23, 2007, the School Board voted to fight a remonstrance by property taxpayers in the FWCS district opposing a $500 million Facilities Improvement Plan. The organization Code Blue Schools led the remonstrance. Remonstrance petitions were submitted to the Allen County Auditor on July 1, 2007. Those against the $500 million bond issue submitted over 33,000 signatures, in contrast with the 11,000 signatures collected in favor of the bond issue.

=== Elmhurst High School closure ===
On March 22, 2010, a vote was taken by the FWCS School Board to accept a recommendation of the FWCS administration regarding ways to reduce the 2010 district budget by $15 million. The administration's report included the step of closing Elmhurst High School. The budget moves were required because current economic conditions reduced federal and state funds available to the district. The closing of Elmhurst was controversial. By a unanimous vote of 7–0, the board agreed to accept the administration's recommendation for closure, effective upon completion of the 2009–2010 academic year. Returning students were reallocated to other high schools in the FWCS system.

== Schools ==
As well as offering public education during the day, FWCS offers continuing education classes and events that meet in its buildings in the evenings and on weekends (Saturday and Sunday).

=== High schools ===
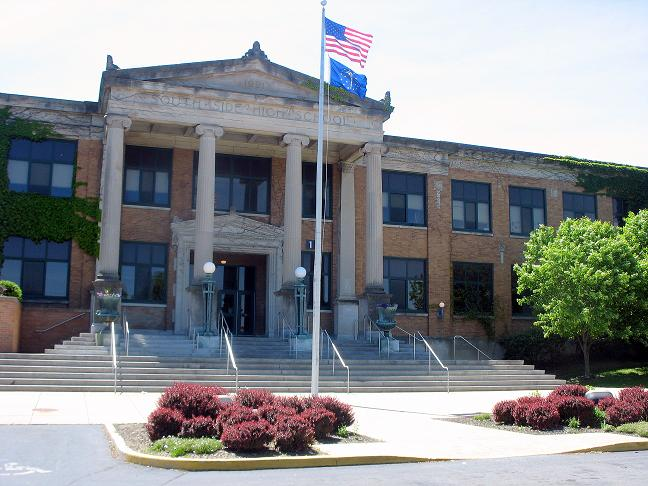
South Side High School

- North Side High School
- Northrop High School
- R. Nelson Snider High School
- South Side High School
- Wayne High School

=== Middle schools ===
- Blackhawk Middle School
- Jefferson Middle School
- Kekionga Middle School
- Lakeside Middle School
- Lane Middle School
- Memorial Park Middle School
- Miami Middle School
- Northwood Middle School
- Portage Middle School
- Shawnee Middle School
- Towles Intermediate Montessori School

=== Intermediate school ===
- Towles Intermediate School (grades 1–8)

=== Elementary schools ===
- Abbett Elementary School
- Adams Elementary School
- Arlington Elementary School
- Bloomingdale Elementary School
- Brentwood Elementary School
- Bunche Montessori Early Childhood Center
- Croninger Elementary School
- Fairfield Elementary School
- Forest Park Elementary School
- Franke Park Elementary School
- Glenwood Park Elementary School
- Haley Elementary School
- Harris Elementary School
- Harrison Hill Elementary School
- Holland Elementary School
- Indian Village Elementary School
- Irwin Elementary School
- Levan Scott Academy
- Lincoln Elementary School
- Lindley Elementary School
- Maplewood Elementary School
- Nebraska Elementary School (closed in 2016)
- Northcrest Elementary School
- Price Elementary School
- Shambaugh Elementary School
- South Wayne Elementary School
- St. Joseph Central Elementary School
- Study Elementary School
- Washington Center Elementary School
- Washington Elementary School
- Waynedale Elementary School
- Weisser Park Elementary School
- Young Early Childhood Center

=== Other facilities ===
- Anthis Career Center
- L.C. Ward Education Center

== See also ==
- List of school districts in Indiana
