= Jaylon Smith =

American football player (born 1995)

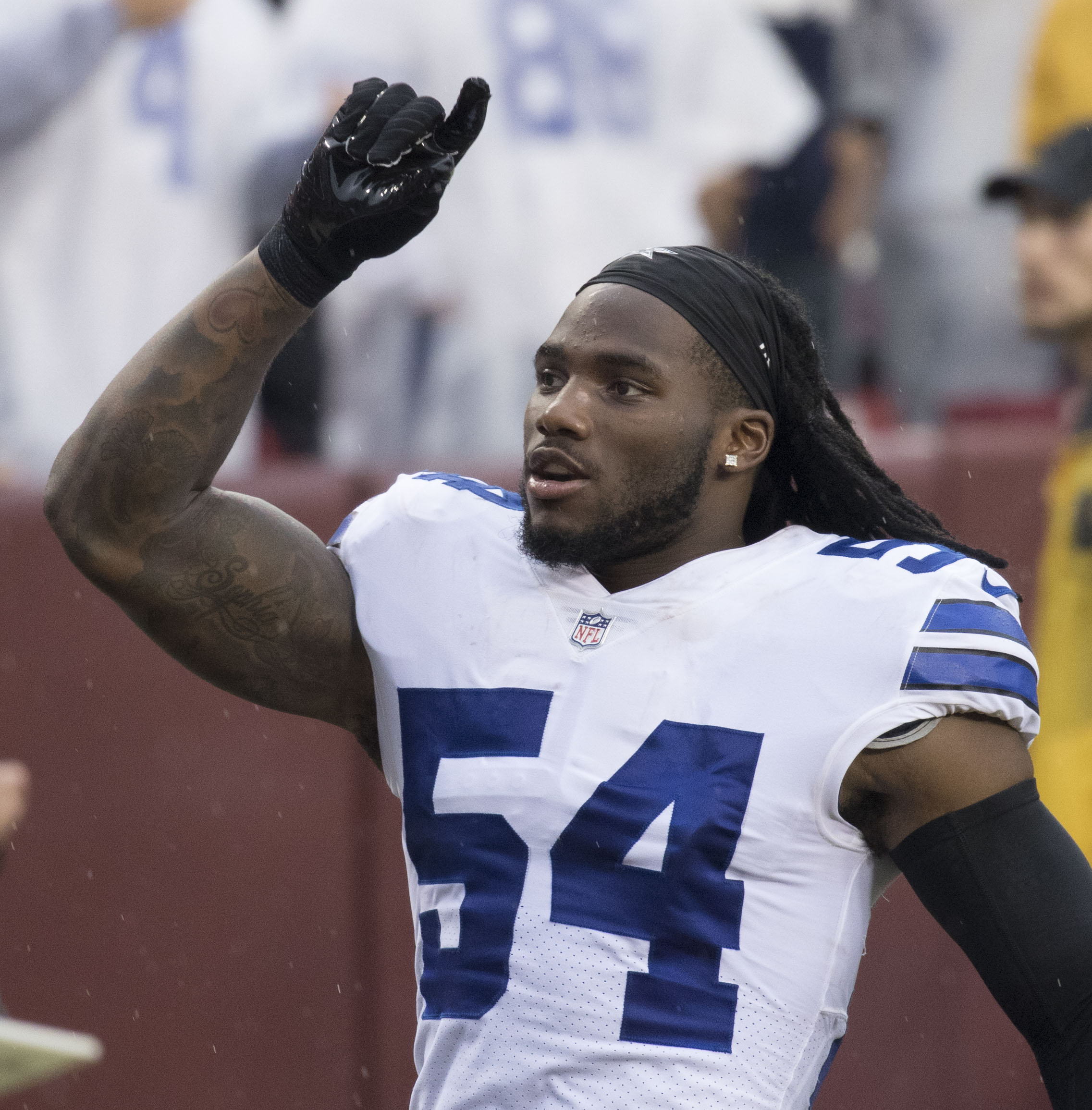
- Smith with the Dallas Cowboys in 2017

No. 9, 15, 45, 54
- Position: Linebacker

Personal information
- Born: June 14, 1995 (age 31); Fort Wayne, Indiana, U.S.
- Listed height: 6 ft 2 in (1.88 m)
- Listed weight: 244 lb (111 kg)

Career information
- High school: Bishop Luers (Fort Wayne, Indiana)
- College: Notre Dame (2013–2015)
- NFL draft: 2016: 2nd round, 34th overall pick

Career history

Playing
- Dallas Cowboys (2016–2021); Green Bay Packers (2021); New York Giants (2021–2022); New Orleans Saints (2023); Las Vegas Raiders (2023)*; Pittsburgh Steelers (2023)*; Las Vegas Raiders (2025)*
- * Offseason or practice squad member only

Coaching
- North Side HS (IN) (2026–present) Interim head coach

Awards and highlights
- Pro Bowl (2019); Butkus Award (college) (2015); Independent DPOY (2014); Consensus All-American (2015); Second-team All-American (2014); 2× First-team All-Independent (2014, 2015)

Career NFL statistics
- Total tackles: 626
- Sacks: 11.0
- Forced fumbles: 6
- Fumble recoveries: 6
- Interceptions: 2
- Pass deflections: 21
- Defensive touchdowns: 1
- Stats at Pro Football Reference

Jaylon Smith (born June 14, 1995) is an American football coach and former linebacker who is the interim head coach of North Side High School in Fort Wayne, Indiana. He played college football for the Notre Dame Fighting Irish and was selected 34th overall by the Dallas Cowboys in the second round of the 2016 NFL draft.

== Early life ==
Smith attended Bishop Luers High School in Fort Wayne, Indiana, where he was a letterman in football, basketball and track. In football, he won the Butkus Award as a senior, given to the best high school linebacker in the country, and was named the Mr. Football award winner for the state of Indiana.

He helped Bishop Luers to a 40–28 win over Indianapolis Cardinal Ritter in the 2012 Indiana 2A title game while rushing for 150 yards and scoring three touchdowns, as Bishop Luers became first Indiana 2A school to win four straight state titles. He finished with 1,265 rushing yards and 18 touchdowns on 176 attempts as senior in 2012 to go with 10 receptions for 66 yards and two more touchdowns. Defensively, he recorded 72 tackles (43 solo), 19.5 tackles for loss, eight sacks, two forced fumbles, one fumble recovery and seven pass deflections.

In basketball, he played as a freshman, sophomore and junior, and was teammates with former Ohio State basketball player Deshaun Thomas.

In track & field, Smith competed in events ranging from the relays to the shot put as a senior. At the 2013 IHSAA T&F Sectional, he took fourth in the shot put, with a PR of 14.81 meters (48 ft 6 in), and ran the lead leg on first-place 4 × 100 m (43.43) and fourth leg on second-place 4 × 400 m (3:27.08). At the 2013 SAC T&F Meet, he anchored the Bishop Luers' 4 × 100 m relay team, winning the event with a time of 42.91 seconds, and the 4 × 400 m, which finished in third place, while also placing third in the shot put (47 ft 5 in) and eight in the 400-meter dash (53.46 s).

Smith signed his letter of intent on February 6, 2013, and committed to attend and play football at the University of Notre Dame. He was considered the best outside linebacker recruit of his class by Rivals.com and Scout.com. He played in the 2013 U.S. Army All-American Bowl.

College recruiting
Name	Hometown	School	Height	Weight	40^{‡}	Commit date
Jaylon Smith; OLB	Fort Wayne, IN	Bishop Luers High School	6 ft 3 in (1.91 m)	237 lb (108 kg)	4.50	Jun 2, 2012
Jaylon Smith; OLB	Recruit ratings: Scout: Rivals: (90)					
Overall recruit ranking: Scout: 1 (OLB), 1 (regional), 3 (national) Rivals: 1 (OLB), 3 (national) ESPN: 2 (OLB), 1 (regional), 7 (national)
Note: In many cases, Scout, Rivals, 247Sports, On3, and ESPN may conflict in their listings of height and weight.; In these cases, the average was taken. ESPN grades are on a 100-point scale.; Sources: "Notre Dame Football Commitment List". Rivals.; "Notre Dame College Football Recruiting Commits". Scout.; "ESPN". ESPN.; "Scout.com Team Recruiting Rankings". Scout.; "2013 Team Ranking". Rivals.com.

== College career ==
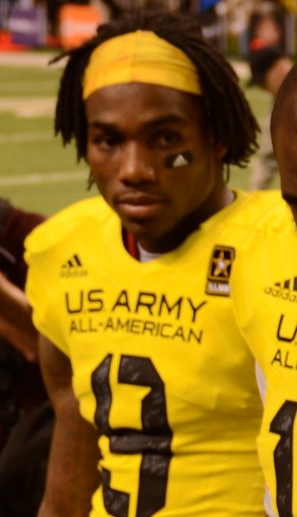
Smith in 2013,

In 2013, Smith won the starting DOG linebacker position beating out Ben Councell, after incumbent starter Danny Spond had to retire due to migraine issues. Starting all 13 games, he recorded 67 tackles, including 6.5 for loss, one forced fumble, three pass break ups and one interception. His best game came in a 34–30 victory against Arizona State, where he recorded nine tackles, including 1.5 for loss. He notched his first career interception against USC on a pass thrown by Cody Kessler.

With the arrival of new defensive coordinator Brian VanGorder, he was moved to an inside linebacker position in 2014. He was one of three players to start all 13 games on defense, recording 112 tackles, including nine for loss, and 3.5 sacks, adding two pass breakups and one forced fumble. He was named the FBS Independent Co-Defensive Player of the Year, along with teammate Joe Schmidt IV and was named a second-team All-American by the Associated Press.

During his junior year in 2015, Smith played in all 13 games with 115 tackles, nine tackles for loss, one sack, five passes defended, two fumble recoveries, and 1 forced fumble. He won the Butkus Award, given annually to college football's top linebacker. During the Fiesta Bowl game against Ohio State, Smith suffered a knee injury in the first quarter and left the game. It was confirmed that the knee was diagnosed with tears to the ACL and LCL. He underwent successful knee surgery on both ligaments on January 7, 2016. On January 11, 2016, Smith announced he would forego his remaining eligibility and enter the 2016 NFL draft.

== Professional career ==
Pre-draft measurables
Height	Weight	Arm length	Hand span	Wingspan
6 ft 2 in (1.88 m)	223 lb (101 kg)	33 in (0.84 m)	9 1/2 in (0.24 m)	6 ft 6 1/4 in (1.99 m)
All values from NFL Combine

Prior to his injury in the Fiesta Bowl, Smith was projected to be a top-five pick in the 2016 NFL draft. On January 11, 2016, Smith released a statement through Twitter announcing his decision to forgo his remaining eligibility and enter the 2016 NFL Draft. Smith attended the NFL Scouting Combine in Indianapolis in order to meet with teams, but was unable to participate in workouts due to his injury. On April 14, 2016, Smith was one of multiple prospects to undergo extensive medical evaluations as multiple teams were worried about the possibility of nerve damage. He received tests to objectively measure his nerve function. Smith attended a pre-draft visit with the San Francisco 49ers. At the conclusion of the pre-draft process, NFL draft experts and scouts projected Smith to be selected as early as the second round to as late as the sixth round. The majority of NFL draft experts projected him to be a third- or fourth-round pick. He was ranked the 10th best outside linebacker prospect in the draft by DraftScout.com and was ranked the 11th best linebacker by NFL analyst Mike Mayock.

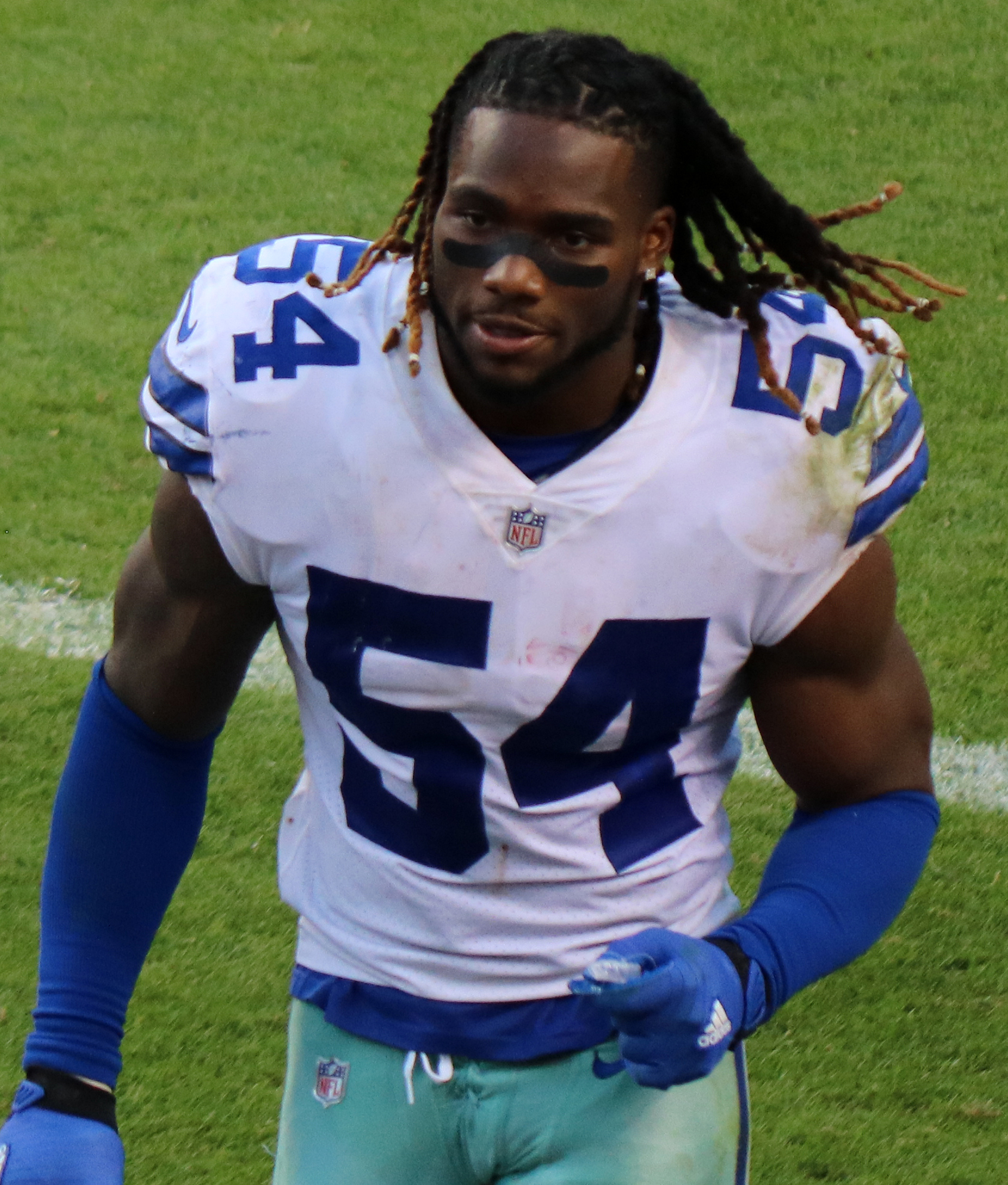
Smith in 2017

=== Dallas Cowboys ===
==== 2016 season ====
The Dallas Cowboys selected Smith in the second round (34th overall) of the 2016 NFL draft. The Cowboys selected Smith after they unsuccessfully tried to trade their second (34th overall) and third round (67th overall) draft choices to move back into the first round of the 2016 NFL Draft to select quarterback Paxton Lynch. The selection of Smith by the Dallas Cowboys surprised many observers and the media as they gambled on Smith's ability to return from his serious left knee injury he suffered in his last college game. Smith was operated on by the Dallas Cowboys’ doctor, Dan Cooper. Smith was the fourth linebacker drafted in 2016.

External videos
- Cowboys draft Jaylon Smith 34th overall
- Jaylon Smith received phone call from Jerry Jones

On May 20, 2016, the Dallas Cowboys signed Smith to a four-year, $6.49 million contract that includes $4.42 million guaranteed and a signing bonus of $2.92 million.

Jared Dubin, a CBS Sports writer, stated in an article posted to CBSSports.com on June 29, 2016, that "The Cowboys are confident in their diagnosis because it was their team physician that did Smith's surgery." He also went on to point out that, since the team's physician was the one to do the surgery, the Cowboys had more up-to-date information than other teams. Dubin then continued by saying that the Cowboys were in dire need of a superstar like Jaylon Smith, and that they could not afford to lose such a valuable prospect. As expected, Smith was inactive for the entire 2016 NFL season as he recovered from his torn ACL and MCL.

==== 2017 season ====
On June 7, 2017, Smith participated in drills for the first time in front of media since his torn ACL and MCL. Smith entered training camp as a backup middle linebacker. On July 20, 2017, the Dallas Cowboys signed linebacker Justin Durant as insurance in the event Smith was unable to fully recover before the start of the regular season. Smith was expected to experience full nerve regeneration within the next six to nine months after suffering nerve damage as a result of his injury. On July 26, 2017, Smith took part in practice in full pads for the first time since college, but received limited reps as the coaching staff was cautious as he became acclimated to playing in full pads. The Dallas Cowboys planned to use Smith as a backup and rotational player primarily on first and second down to avoid putting him in pass situations. The plan to use him for 25–30 snaps per game was eventually scrapped after they were forced to use him more than expected after starting middle linebacker Anthony Hitchens suffered a tibial plateau fracture in the last preseason game. Head coach Jason Garrett named Smith the starting middle linebacker to begin the regular season, alongside outside linebackers Sean Lee and Damien Wilson.

He made his professional regular season debut and first career start in the Dallas Cowboys’ season-opener against the New York Giants and recorded seven combined tackles and forced a fumble during their 19–3 victory. In Week 4, he collected a season-high ten combined tackles (seven solo) during a 35–30 loss to the Los Angeles Rams. Smith remained as the starting middle linebacker in Weeks 4 and 5 after Anthony Hitchens was moved to outside linebacker to fill in for an injured Sean Lee.

In Week 7, Smith was demoted to backup middle linebacker after Anthony Hitchens returned from injury. On October 22, 2017, Smith recorded three combined tackles and forced a fumble on his first career sack during the Cowboys’ 40–10 win at the San Francisco 49ers in Week 7. Smith made his first career sack on 49ers’ quarterback C. J. Beathard for a six-yard loss and also forced a fumble by Bethard that was recovered by teammate Tyrone Crawford in the third quarter. Smith finished his 2nd NFL season in 2017 with 81 combined tackles (50 solo), two pass deflections, two forced fumbles, and one sack in 16 games and six starts.

==== 2018 season ====
Smith entered training camp slated as the starting middle linebacker after Anthony Hitchens departed for the Kansas City Chiefs during free agency. Head coach Jason Garrett named Smith the starting middle linebacker to start the regular season, ahead of rookie first-round pick Leighton Vander Esch. He began the season alongside outside linebackers Sean Lee and Damien Wilson. On October 7, 2018, Smith collected 12 combined tackles (six solo), broke up a pass, and made a sack during a 19–16 loss at the Houston Texans in Week 5. In Week 16, against the Tampa Bay Buccaneers, he had a 69-yard fumble return for a touchdown in the 27–20 victory. In the 2018 season, Smith finished with four sacks, 121 total tackles, four passes defended, and two forced fumbles. He was ranked 61st by his fellow players on the NFL Top 100 Players of 2019.

==== 2019 season ====
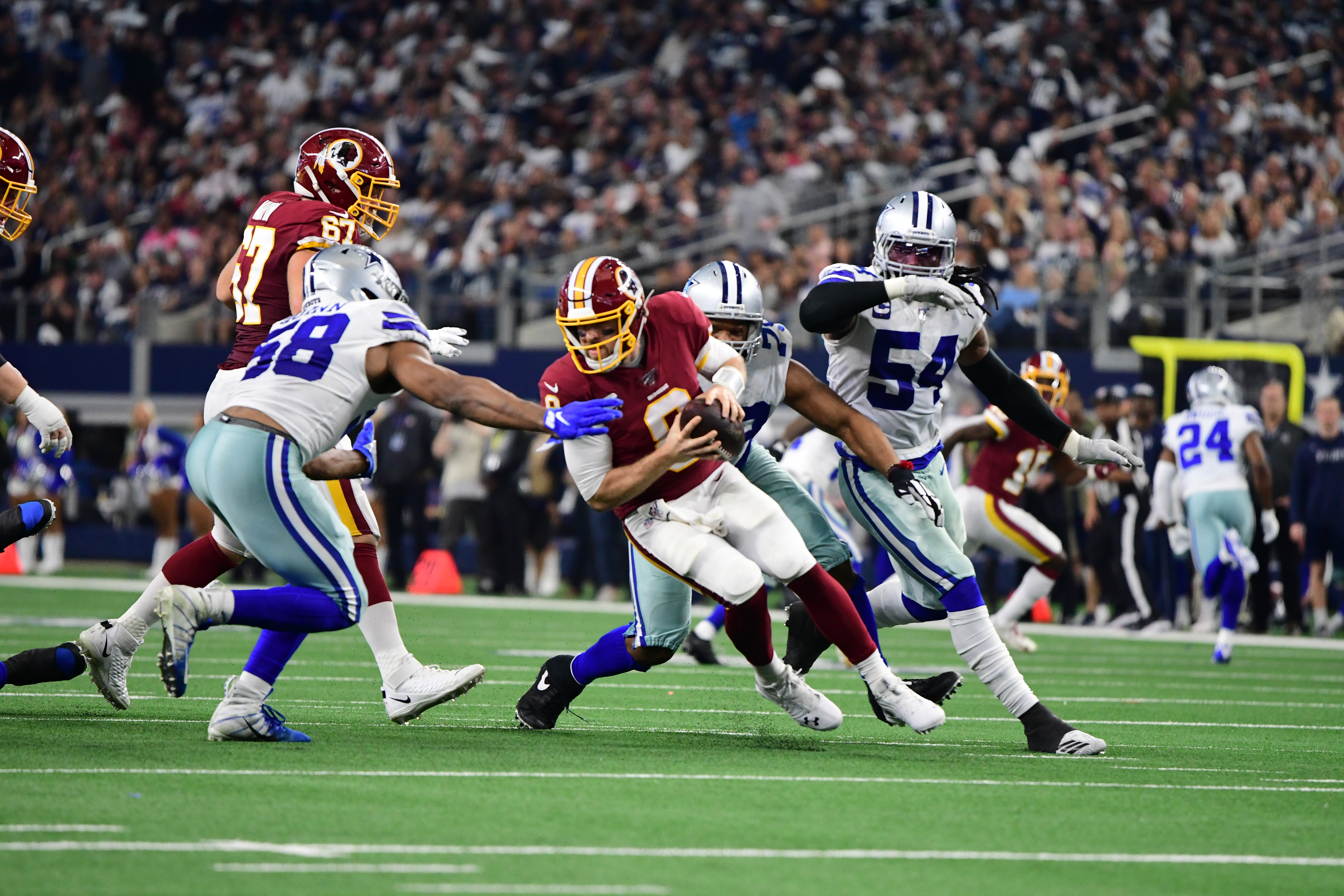
Smith in a game against the Washington Redskins

On August 20, 2019, Smith signed a five-year, $64 million contract extension with the Cowboys with $35.5 million guaranteed, keeping him under contract through the 2024 season.

Smith was also elected as a first time team captain for the 2019 Dallas Cowboys season. In week 9 against the New York Giants on Monday Night Football, Smith recorded a team high 12 tackles and half a sack on Daniel Jones in the 37–18 win. In week 10 against the Minnesota Vikings on Sunday Night Football, Smith recorded a team high 13 tackles in the 28–24 loss.

In week 17 against the Washington Redskins, Smith recorded a team high eight tackles and intercepted a pass thrown by Case Keenum during the 47–16 win. This was Smith's first career interception in the NFL. In the 2019 season, Smith finished with 2.5 sacks, 142 total tackles, one interception, nine passes defended, and two forced fumbles. He was ranked 88th by his fellow players on the NFL Top 100 Players of 2020.

==== 2020 season ====
Smith received criticism from the media during the season because of his level of play and the defense's struggles. In Week 2 against the Atlanta Falcons, Smith led the team with 13 tackles during the 40–39 come from behind win. In Week 5 against the New York Giants, he had 12 tackles (3 for loss), a half-sack and two quarterback pressures. In Week 11 against the Minnesota Vikings, Smith recorded his first full sack of the season on Kirk Cousins during the 31–28 win. In Week 12 against the Washington Football Team on Thanksgiving, Smith recorded his first interception off a pass thrown by Alex Smith and made a 43-yard return during the 41–16 loss. He finished with 145 total tackles 1.5 sacks, one interception, and five passes defended.

==== 2021 season ====
Earlier in the NFL offseason, he had wrist surgery in January. He also announced his decision to change his number from 54 to 9 from his college days, despite public backlash from some of the fan base, saying that the number belonged to former quarterback Tony Romo. It was reported in the media, that the change forced Smith to pay a mid-six figure sum, in order to buy back the existing inventory of jerseys and T-shirts with his old number.

On October 5, 2021, the Cowboys released Smith after he declined to waive his 2022 injury guarantee contract clause, to protect the team from a possible payment of $9.2 million, and after he was passed on the depth chart by rookie Micah Parsons and veteran Keanu Neal. He appeared in 4 games with 2 starts during the season.

Smith finished his Cowboys career with 68 appearances, 516 tackles (including 20 for loss), nine sacks, two interceptions, six forced fumbles, and five fumble recoveries (including one returned for a touchdown).

=== Green Bay Packers ===
On October 7, 2021, Smith signed with the Green Bay Packers. On November 2, 2021, Smith was released. He appeared in two games, collecting one tackle in 27 defensive snaps.

=== New York Giants ===
==== 2021 season ====
On December 17, 2021, Smith signed with the practice squad of the New York Giants. He reunited with offensive coordinator Jason Garrett, who was his head coach with the Cowboys. The following day, Smith was activated from the practice squad as a COVID-19 replacement, for the Giants' matchup against the Dallas Cowboys. On December 20, 2021, Smith was promoted to the active roster. He appeared in four games with two starts, making 19 tackles, one sack and one pass defensed.

==== 2022 season ====
On September 20, 2022, Smith was re-signed by the New York Giants to their practice squad. On October 1, he was promoted to the active roster, to replace Austin Calitro. Smith seized the middle linebacker role over Tae Crowder, in the team's eighth game against the Seattle Seahawks. He appeared in 13 games with 11 starts, tallying 74 tackles, one sack, and one fumble recovery, while leading the linebackers with 724 defensive snaps (including the playoffs).

=== New Orleans Saints ===
On August 11, 2023, Smith signed with the New Orleans Saints. He was released by New Orleans on August 29, and was subsequently re–signed to the team's practice squad.

=== Las Vegas Raiders ===
On November 2, 2023, Smith was signed by the Las Vegas Raiders off of the Saints' practice squad. He appeared in one game against the New York Giants, making two tackles in 25 defensive snaps. Smith was declared inactive in two contests, and was ultimately released on November 22.

=== Pittsburgh Steelers ===
On December 27, 2023, Smith was signed to the Pittsburgh Steelers practice squad. His contract expired at the end of the season and was not re-signed.

=== Las Vegas Raiders (second stint) ===
On May 12, 2025, Smith signed with the Las Vegas Raiders. He was released by the Raiders on August 25.

== Career statistics ==
=== NFL ===
Year	Team	Games		Tackles				Interceptions					Fumbles		
Year	Team	GP	GS	Comb	Solo	Ast	Sck	Int	Yds	Avg	TD	PD	FF	FR	TD
2017	DAL	16	6	81	50	31	1.0	0	0	0.0	0	4	2	0	0
2018	DAL	16	16	121	82	39	4.0	0	0	0.0	0	2	2	2	1
2019	DAL	16	16	142	83	59	2.5	1	0	0.0	0	9	2	1	0
2020	DAL	16	16	154	89	65	1.5	1	43	43.0	0	5	0	2	0
2021	DAL	4	2	18	13	5	0.0	0	0	0.0	0	0	0	0	0
2021	GB	2	0	1	1	0	0.0	0	0	0.0	0	0	0	0	0
2021	NYG	4	2	19	12	7	1.0	0	0	0.0	0	1	0	0	0
2022	NYG	13	11	88	46	42	1.0	0	0	0.0	0	0	0	0	0
2023	LV	1	0	2	2	0	0.0	0	0	0.0	0	0	0	0	0
Career		88	69	626	378	248	11.0	2	43	21.5	0	21	6	5	1

=== College ===
Season	Team	Class	GP	Tackling					Interceptions					Fumbles			
Season	Team	Class	GP	Comb	Solo	Ast	TfL	Sck	Int	Yds	Lng	TD	PD	FF	FR	Yds	TD
2013	Notre Dame	FR	13	67	41	26	6.5	0.0	1	−1	−1	0	3	1	1	0	0
2014	Notre Dame	SO	13	111	64	47	9.0	3.5	0	0	0	0	2	1	0	0	0
2015	Notre Dame	JR	13	115	69	46	9.0	1.0	0	0	0	0	5	1	2	0	0
Career			39	292	174	118	24.5	4.5	1	-1	-1	0	10	3	3	0	0

== Personal life ==
Jaylon has an older brother, Rod who has played for five NFL teams.

In July 2025, Smith opened a restaurant in South Bend, Indiana.
