= Selwyn Lymon =

American football player (born 1986)

No. 84
- Position: Wide receiver

Personal information
- Born: September 21, 1986 (age 40); Fort Wayne, Indiana
- Listed height: 6 ft 3 in (1.91 m)
- Listed weight: 216 lb (98 kg)

Career information
- High school: Paul Harding (Fort Wayne, Indiana)
- College: Purdue
- NFL draft: 2008: undrafted

Career history
- Miami Dolphins (2008)*
- * Offseason or practice squad member only

Selwyn Jalil Lymon (born September 21, 1986) is an American former football wide receiver. He was signed by the Miami Dolphins as an undrafted free agent in 2008. He played college football at Purdue.

== Early life ==
As a high school athlete, Lymon excelled in two sports. His ability in football enabled him to sign a scholarship to play at Purdue. In basketball, his excellence led to Lymon being named a recipient of the Tiffany Gooden Award, given annually to the most outstanding male or female basketball player in the SAC.

== Personal ==
Lymon is a cousin of NFL safety Bernard Pollard.
