= Anthony Spencer (American football) =

American football player (born 1984)

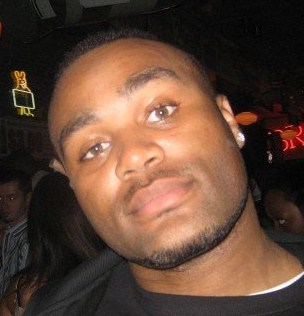
- Spencer in 2010

No. 93
- Position: Linebacker

Personal information
- Born: January 23, 1984 (age 42); Fort Wayne, Indiana, U.S.
- Listed height: 6 ft 3 in (1.91 m)
- Listed weight: 265 lb (120 kg)

Career information
- High school: Bishop Luers (Fort Wayne)
- College: Purdue (2002–2006)
- NFL draft: 2007: 1st round, 26th overall pick

Career history
- Dallas Cowboys (2007–2014); New Orleans Saints (2015)

Awards and highlights
- Pro Bowl (2012); Third-team All-American (2006); First-team All-Big Ten (2006)

Career NFL statistics
- Total tackles: 385
- Sacks: 33
- Forced fumbles: 13
- Fumble recoveries: 6
- Interceptions: 1
- Defensive touchdowns: 1
- Stats at Pro Football Reference

Anthony E. Spencer II (born January 23, 1984) is an American former professional football player who was a linebacker for nine seasons in the National Football League (NFL) for the Dallas Cowboys and New Orleans Saints. He played college football for the Purdue Boilermakers and was selected by the Cowboys in the first round of the 2007 NFL draft with the 26th overall pick.

== Early life ==
Spencer played high school football at Bishop Luers High School in Fort Wayne, Indiana. Spencer was a 3-year starter playing nose guard and fullback. At fullback, he dominated in the backfield and ran for more than 600 yards, averaging a solid 9.1 yards per carry. By the time Spencer was through, he ended his high school career by setting team records in tackles and sacks. A diverse athlete, Anthony lettered in both football and basketball, and this helped him get accepted to Purdue University.

Spencer was a two-time All-state selection and three-time all-area and all-conference selection while playing in the Summit Athletic Conference. He was named the Indianapolis Star's Defensive Lineman of the Year as a senior, when his team went undefeated and won the 2002 Class 2A state championship.

In his 3 years as a starter, Spencer and the Luers team lost a total of 3 games. In addition to the 2002 championship, Luers lost two games on their way to the 2000 Class 2A championship, and their only loss in 2001 came in the 2001 Class 2A championship game.

College recruiting
Name	Hometown	School	Height	Weight	40^{‡}	Commit date
Anthony Spencer; DE	Fort Wayne, Indiana	Bishop Luers High School	6 ft 4 in (1.93 m)	240 lb (110 kg)	4.6	Jul 8, 2003
Anthony Spencer; DE	Recruit ratings: Scout: Rivals:					
Overall recruit ranking: Scout: -- (OL) Rivals: 17 (DE), -- (IN)
‡ Refers to 40-yard dash; Note: In many cases, Scout, Rivals, 247Sports, On3, and ESPN may conflict in their listings of height, weight and 40 time.; In these cases, the average was taken. ESPN grades are on a 100-point scale.; Sources: "2002 Team Ranking". Rivals.com.

Spencer committed to Purdue University on July 8, 2003. He also had FBS scholarship offers from Michigan State.

== College career ==
Spencer accepted a scholarship to play college football at Purdue University. He spent the 2002 season on the Purdue scout team as a redshirt freshman. He appeared in ten games during the 2003 season, recording six tackles and one stop behind the line of scrimmage.

In 2004, Spencer played in 12 games and started in 11. He registered 33 tackles and finished third on the team with 7.5 sacks and 9.5 stops for losses. He also batted down six passes and forced three fumbles, earning All-Big Ten Conference honorable mention.

Even though he started all 11 games in 2005, Spencer failed to match his 2004 performance due to several minor injuries. He was limited to 23 tackles, three sacks, and 7.5 stops behind the line of scrimmage. He caused three fumbles and recovered another while also deflecting one pass.

Spencer had a great senior season in 2006. He finished the season ranked second in the nation with 26.5 stops behind the line of scrimmage, the fifth-best season total in Big Ten Conference history. He finished second on the team with 93 tackles (a high number for a defensive lineman) and first with 10.5 sacks. He also caused five fumbles and recovered another while batting away six passes and blocking one kick. He was named the Purdue football team's Most Valuable Player.

As a former Indiana high school all-star who also excelled at Purdue, Spencer was co-recipient of the 2007 Rabold Award given by the Indiana Football Coaches Association. Spencer also was invited to play in the 2007 Senior Bowl.

Spencer received a degree in African-American Studies, with a minor in Law & Society.

== Professional career ==
=== Dallas Cowboys ===
==== 2007 season ====
Spencer was selected in the first round with the 26th overall pick by the Dallas Cowboys in the 2007 NFL draft. After trading their first round selection to the Cleveland Browns, the Cowboys traded back into the first round to draft him. The Cowboys traded their 2007 second-round pick (#36-Kevin Kolb), 2007 third-round pick (#87-Stewart Bradley) and a 2007 fifth-round pick (#159-C.J. Gaddis) to their division rival Philadelphia Eagles, in exchange for their 1st-round pick (26th overall).

Spencer was converted to an outside linebacker and named the starter opposite to DeMarcus Ware, while Greg Ellis was recovering from his Achilles surgery. He started the first six games of the season, becoming only the fourth rookie linebacker in franchise history to start in a season-opener (Lee Roy Jordan, Robert Jones, Ware).

He played in all 16 regular season games and Cowboys' playoff game. He recorded his first NFL sack against the Chicago Bears on NBC Sunday Night Football. Spencer was demoted from his starting position, after Ellis regained his playing form. He finished the season with 28 tackles, 3 sacks, and two forced fumbles.

==== 2008 season ====
Spencer played in just 12 games for the Cowboys, starting none. In his limited playing time, Spencer recorded 34 tackles and 1.5 sacks.

==== 2009 season ====
After two years in Dallas's defensive system, he became a starter with the departure of Greg Ellis. He would put together a solid 2009 campaign, recording a career best 67 tackles and 6 sacks, along with 2 forced fumbles and his first career interception. Spencer started all 16 regular season games for the Cowboys in 2009, starting at outside linebacker opposite teammate DeMarcus Ware.

While Dallas was able to win their first playoff game in over a decade, the Cowboys fell to the Minnesota Vikings in the NFC Divisional Playoffs. Spencer pitched in two tackles and a sack in the Wild Card game against Philadelphia, and had an outstanding game against the Vikings in the Divisional Round, recording 10 tackles and a sack in a 34-3 Dallas loss.

==== 2010 season ====
Spencer followed up his 2009 season with a very solid 2010 season, as he again started all sixteen games. For the first time in Spencer's Dallas career, the team finished with a losing record, at 6–10 (the Cowboys were 13–3 in 2007, 9–7 in 2008, and 11–5 in 2009). Despite the overall disappointment of Dallas's season, Spencer put in a solid 16 starts, recording 63 tackles, 5 sacks, and 2 forced fumbles.

==== 2011 season ====
In the 2011 NFL season (and the last year of Spencer's rookie contract), Spencer recorded 51 solo tackles, 15 assist tackles, for a total of 66 tackles. Spencer also recorded 6 sacks, 1 pass deflection and 4 forced fumbles in 15 starts as the Dallas Cowboys finished the season 8–8 with no playoff appearance.

==== 2012 season ====
On March 5, the Dallas Cowboys placed the franchise tag on Spencer. More than a month later, and just before the 2012 NFL draft, He officially signed the franchise tag, guaranteeing him a salary of $8.856 million for the 2012 season.

Spencer ended up having a break out season and being named to his first Pro Bowl as an injury replacement for Green Bay's Clay Matthews. Even though he missed two games, he recorded his first double-digit sack (11) season, had 27 quarterback hurries, led the Cowboys with 95 tackles, and was the only player in the NFL with 90+ tackles and 10+ sacks.

==== 2013 season ====
For the second year in a row, the Cowboys put the franchise tag on Spencer. The tender is worth $9.6 million. Under Monte Kiffin as new defensive coordinator, both Spencer and DeMarcus Ware were expected to play as defensive ends as the team reverted to a 4–3 defense. He missed all of the preseason after a surgical procedure that at the time was said to be for a bone bruise on his left knee. He came back to play against the Kansas City Chiefs registering 2 tackles and one quarterback hurry. After experiencing pain in his knee following the game, he underwent season-ending microfracture surgery.

==== 2014 season ====
After remaining a free agent for over a month, Spencer re-signed with the Cowboys with a one-year deal on April 26. Recovering from career threatening knee surgery, there were questions of how much he would play in 2014. His recovery ramped up at the end of training camp and was able to come back for the fourth game against the New Orleans Saints.

He was solid against the run and steadily improved as a pass rusher, finishing with 17 quarterback pressures (tied for fourth on the team). In the playoffs against the Detroit Lions he played a season-high 40 snaps and finished the game with 3 tackles, one sack and forced a fumble in the fourth quarter that would have ended the game, had DeMarcus Lawrence not fumbled the ball while returning it. In two playoff games he registered a sack and led the team with 7 quarterback pressures.

=== New Orleans Saints ===
On April 10, 2015, Spencer signed a one-year contract with the New Orleans Saints as a free agent. During preseason, he was playing outside linebacker with the first team unit and was expected to replace Junior Galette, but after suffering an injury that kept him out of action since the first preseason game, he was placed on the injured reserve list on September 1, before being released on October 20.

== NFL career statistics ==
Year	Team	GP	Tackles				Fumbles			Interceptions					
Year	Team	GP	Cmb	Solo	Ast	Sck	FF	FR	Yds	Int	Yds	Avg	Lng	TD	PD
2007	DAL	16	36	28	8	3.0	2	0	0	0	0	0	0	0	0
2008	DAL	12	34	22	12	1.5	0	1	0	0	0	0	0	0	0
2009	DAL	16	67	50	17	6.0	2	2	0	1	-3	-3	-3	0	7
2010	DAL	16	63	52	11	5.0	2	1	0	0	0	0	0	0	2
2011	DAL	16	66	51	15	6.0	4	0	0	0	0	0	0	0	1
2012	DAL	14	95	55	40	11.0	2	1	0	0	0	0	0	0	3
2013	DAL	1	2	2	0	0.0	0	0	0	0	0	0	0	0	0
Career		101	384	272	112	33.0	13	5	0	1	-3	-3	0	0	13
