= Northrop High School =

Public high school in Fort Wayne, Indiana, U.S.

Location
- 7001 Coldwater Road; Fort Wayne, Indiana 46825; United States; 41°8′47″N 85°8′22″W

Information
- Type: Public, Secondary
- Established: 1971
- Locale: Suburban
- School district: Fort Wayne Community Schools
- Principal: Robb Robison
- Teaching staff: 128.00 (FTE)
- Grades: 9-12
- Enrollment: 2,145 (2024-3025)
- Student to teacher ratio: 16.76
- Color
- Athletics conference: Summit Athletic Conference
- Nickname: Bruins
- Website: northrop.fortwayneschools.org

Northrop High School is a Fort Wayne Community Schools high school located in the northern suburbs of Fort Wayne, Allen County, Indiana, United States. Northrop is classified as 5A by the IHSAA. Northrop High School has had a sister school, the Goethe Gymnasium, in Fort Wayne's sister city, Gera, Germany, since 1994.

== Demographics ==
The demographic breakdown of the 2180 students enrolled in 2021–2022 was:

- Male - 49.4%
- Female - 50.6%
- Native American/Alaskan - 0.5%
- Asian - 5.7%
- Black - 4.8%
- Hispanic - 17.7%
- Native Hawaiian/Pacific islander - 0.2%
- White - 48.6%
- Multiracial - 8.2%

== Arts ==
Northrop's Mixed show choir, Charisma competes in competitions and festivals throughout the Midwest. Allure is Northrop's all female show choir. Allure competes similar to Charisma all around the Midwest. The Big Orange Pride or BOP is Northrop High School's Marching Band. They compete as an ISSMA Class A Open school, but switched to Class A Scholastic under the direction of Rob F. Wilson in 2016. They were 1983 ISSMA Class A State Champion.

== Athletics ==
The Bruins are members of the Summit Athletic Conference. The school's team name is the Bruins and their colors are burnt orange, brown and teal. Many sports are offered at Northrop. Here is a listing, along with the state team championships won.

- Baseball (boys)
  - State champ - 1983
- Basketball (boys & girls)
  - Boys state champ - 1974
  - Girls state champ - 1986
- Cross country (boys & girls)
- Football (boys)
- Golf (boys & girls)
  - Boys state champ - 1984
- Gymnastics (girls)
- Soccer (boys & girls)
- Softball (girls)
- Swimming (boys & girls)
- Tennis (boys & girls)
- Track (boys & girls)
  - Boys state champ - 1997, 2004
  - Girls state champ - 1981, 1991, 2000–2005, 2011, and 2013
- Wrestling (boys & girls)

== Notable alumni ==
- Dan Butler, American television, film, and stage actor.
- Heather Headley, Broadway and R&B singer.
- Jon Schaffer, guitarist in the power/thrash metal band Iced Earth.
- Eric Wedge, NCAA Baseball manager for Wichita State University, formerly and MLB manager for the Cleveland Indians and the Seattle Mariners.
- Josh Gaines, Arena Football League player.
- Matt Land, Trine University football coach.
- Walter Jordan, NBA basketball small forward.
- Angie Hicks, co-founder of and Chief Customer Officer for Angi.

== See also ==
- List of high schools in Indiana
