= Bishop Dwenger High School =

School in Fort Wayne, Indiana, US

Location
- 1300 E Washington Center Rd; Fort Wayne, (Allen County), Indiana 46825; United States; 41.13201°N 85.12520°W

Information
- Motto: Cives Mundorum Duorum (Citizens of Two Worlds)
- Religious affiliation: Roman Catholic
- Patron saint: Mary Queen of All Saints
- Established: 1963
- Founder: Most Rev. Leo A. Pursley
- Superintendent: David Maugel
- Principal: Jason Schiffli
- Chaplain: Jason Garrett
- Grades: 9–12
- Enrollment: 917 (2023-2024)
- Classes offered: Academic, Honors, and Advanced Placement
- Campus type: Suburban
- Color: Gold Navy White
- Fight song: "Oh When the Saints Go Marching In"
- Athletics conference: Summit Athletic Conference
- Mascot: Tuffy
- Nickname: Saints
- Publication: The Halo
- Newspaper: Golden Trumpet
- Yearbook: The Aureate
- Tuition: $7,000-$9,000
- Website: http://www.bishopdwenger.com

Bishop Dwenger High School is a co-educational college preparatory high school in the Roman Catholic Diocese of Fort Wayne–South Bend in Fort Wayne, Indiana, United States. Dwenger is named after Joseph Gregory Dwenger, the second Bishop of the Roman Catholic Diocese of Fort Wayne–South Bend.

== Athletics ==
The Bishop Dwenger athletic program has won state championships in the following sports:

- Cheerleading (1998, 2000, 2007, 2008, 2010, 2011, 2016, 2019)
- Gymnastics (1995, 2003, 2005, 2006, 2012)
- Football (1983, 1990, 1991, 2015, 2018, 2025)
- Girls' soccer (2005, 2006, 2020)
- Softball (2010)
- Rugby (2004, 2015)
- Ice hockey (2014, 2019)
- Volleyball (2020)

== Notable alumni ==
- Kimberly Brubaker Bradley (born 1967), author
- Tom Dixon (born 1961), former professional football player
- Tyler Eifert (born 1990), retired NFL tight end
- Jason Fabini (born 1974), former NFL offensive lineman
- Eddie Gallagher (born 1979), former US Navy SEAL pardoned by President Trump from war crimes charges
- Robert Morris, Indiana State Representative
- Andrea Russett (born 1995), Internet personality
- Michael Y. Scudder (born 1971), United States Circuit Judge, appointed by President Trump in 2018
- Stephanie Smith (born 1975), former NFL Cheerleader for the Indianapolis Colts
- Joe Tippmann (born 2001), NFL offensive lineman for the New York Jets
- Sarah Killion Woldmoe (born 1992), professional soccer player; plays for Chicago Red Stars of the National Women's Soccer League (NWSL)

== See also ==
- List of high schools in Indiana
- Summit Athletic Conference
