= North Side High School (Fort Wayne, Indiana) =

Public high school in Fort Wayne, Indiana, U.S.

Location
- 475 East State Blvd; Fort Wayne, Indiana 46805; United States; 41°5′49.85″N 85°8′7.73″W

Information
- Type: Public high school
- Established: 1927
- School district: Fort Wayne Community Schools
- Principal: Stephanie Leslie
- Teaching staff: 87.95 (on an FTE basis)
- Grades: 9-12
- Enrollment: 1,460 (2023–2024)
- Student to teacher ratio: 16.60
- Colors: Red and white
- Team name: Legends (formerly known as Redskins)
- Website: northside.fortwayneschools.org

North Side High School is a secondary school in the Fort Wayne school system, serving the north central neighborhoods of Fort Wayne.

== History ==
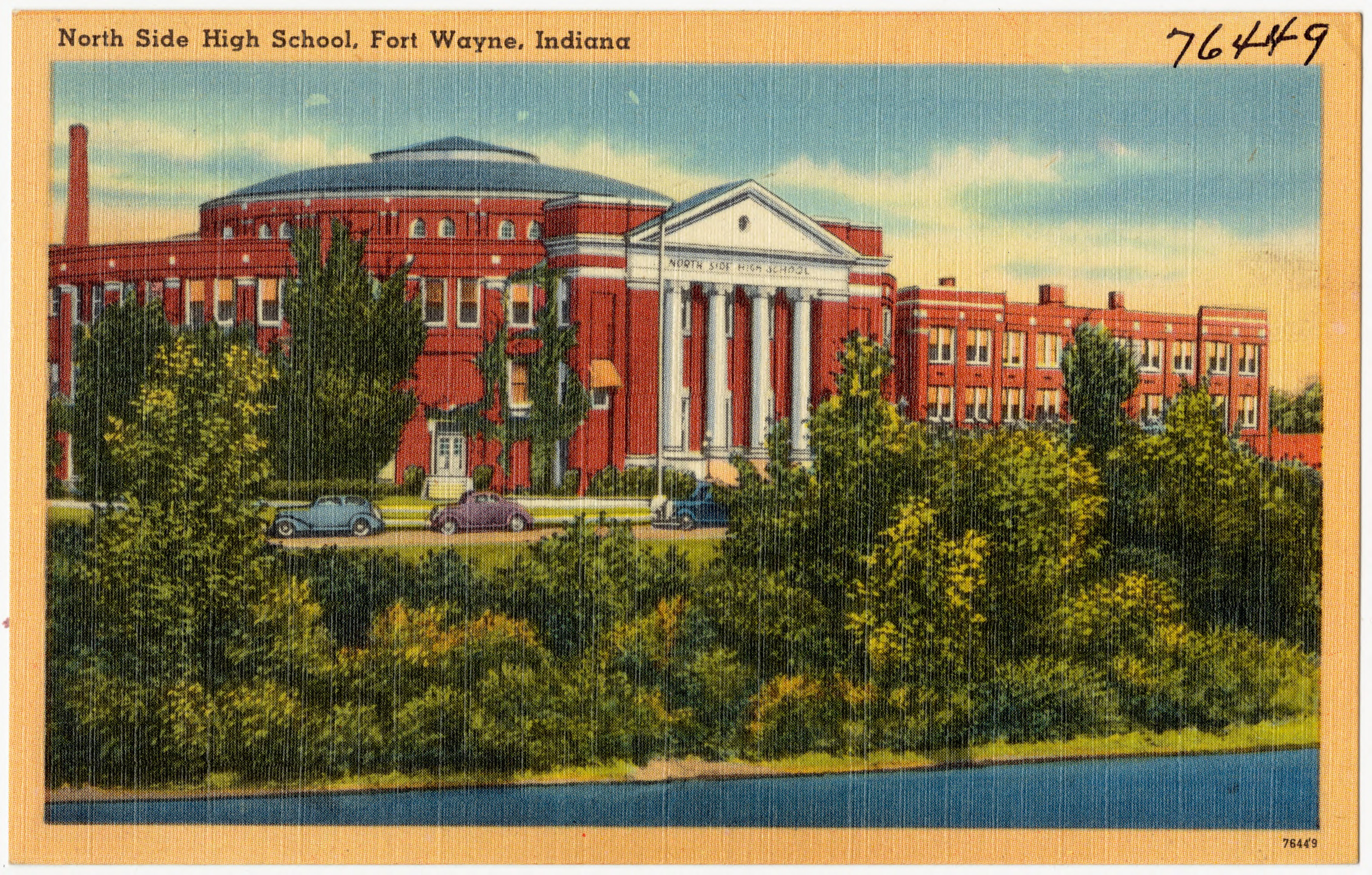
A postcard depicting North Side, circa 1930–1945.

Designed by noted architect Charles R. Weatherhogg (1872–1937) and established 1927, North Side High School has been dedicated to giving the best education available. Recently, it has had a massive renovation to accommodate the growing number of students expected to attend in coming years.

=== Gym ===
North Side High School Gym was an indoor gymnasium in Fort Wayne, Indiana. It originally hosted the MBC/NBL's Fort Wayne General Electrics team that was sponsored directly by General Electric from the MBC's final season in 1936 until they left the rebranded NBL in 1939 (as well as their brief return as a team in the NIBL for that league's inaugural 1947–48 season that became winless for the General Electrics) before it later hosted the NBL turned BAA turned NBA's Fort Wayne (Zollner) Pistons (previously sponsored by Fred Zollner's Zollner Piston Company and now officially known as the Detroit Pistons NBA team) from 1941 when the first joined the NBL until they ended up moving to the (at the time) newly constructed 10,000-seat War Memorial Coliseum in 1952 in an attempt to have the Pistons stay in Fort Wayne. The gymnasium held near 3,000 people and hosted games through 2004 when the school was renovated. The teams at North Side now play in a new gym, By Hey Arena, and the old facility was transformed into the school's library in the renovation.

== Notable alumni ==
- Bill Boedeker, NFL Halfback
- William F. Borgmann, lineman for the national champion 1932 and 1933 Michigan Wolverines football teams
- Keion Brooks Jr., American basketball player
- Bob Cowan, NFL Halfback
- Louis Edward Curdes, WWII flying ace
- Roberto Fortes, Angolan basketball player
- Paul Helmke, Former Mayor of Fort Wayne, Indiana
- Dick Hickox, All-American college basketball player (University of Miami)
- Zach McKinstry, American baseball player
- Gray Morrow, American illustrator
- Amanda Perez, American R&B singer-songwriter
- Jeanette Reibman, Member of the Pennsylvania House of Representatives
- Graham Richard, former mayor of Fort Wayne, Indiana
- Drake Hogestyn, Actor, notably John Black on Days of Our Lives

== See also ==
- List of high schools in Indiana
- Summit Athletic Conference
- Fort Wayne Daisies
