= State Corner Conference =

Defunct high school athletic conference in Indiana

The State Corner Conference was an IHSAA-sanctioned conference located in far Northeast Indiana. The conference started in 1935 competing in basketball, football, and track. The league survived a major shakeup in 1941 as half of the original league left to return to their previous conferences, being replaced by smaller schools in the footprint and dropping football. Because of the league's limited offerings, the schools would also compete within their county-based leagues. The league would fold in 1967, as consolidation had whittled the league to three schools.

== Membership ==
School	Location	Mascot	Colors	# / County	Year joined	Previous conference	Year left	Conference joined
Albion^{1}	Albion	Trojans		57; Noble	1935	Noble County	1941	Noble County
Angola^{2}	Angola	Hornets		76; Steuben	1935	Steuben County	1941	Steuben County
Ashley^{3}	Ashley	Aces		17; DeKalb	1935	DeKalb County	1967	none (consolidated into DeKalb)
Avilla^{1}	Avilla	Panthers		57; Noble	1935	Noble County	1966	none (consolidated into East Noble)
Butler^{3}	Butler	Windmills		17; DeKalb	1935	DeKalb County	1963	none (consolidated into Eastside)
Garrett	Garrett	Railroaders		17; De Kalb	1935	Northeastern Indiana	1941	Northeastern Indiana
Lagrange^{4}	Lagrange	Lions		44; La Grange	1935	LaGrange County	1941	LaGrange County
Waterloo^{3}	Waterloo	Wildcats		17; DeKalb	1935	DeKalb County	1967	none (consolidated into DeKalb)
Fremont^{5}	Fremont	Eagles		76; Steuben	1941	Steuben County	1967	Northeast Corner
Hamilton^{5}	Hamilton	Marines		76; Steuben	1941	Steuben County	1967	Northeast Corner
Wolcottville^{4}	Wolcottville	Bulldogs		44; La Grange	1941	LaGrange County	1964	none (consolidated into Lakeland)
Riverside	Saint Joe	Comets		17; DeKalb	1953	none (new school)	1963	none (consolidated into Eastside)
Eastside	Butler	Blazers		17; DeKalb	1963	none (new school)	1967	Independents (ACAC 1968)

1. Played concurrently in SCC and NCC throughout membership.
2. Played concurrently in State Corner and Steuben County 1935–41.
3. Played concurrently in SCC and DCC 1935–53.
4. Played concurrently in SCC and LCC throughout membership.
5. Played concurrently in State Corner and Steuben County 1941–64, in State Corner and Bi-County 1964–66, and in State Corner and Northeast Corner 1966–67.
