= Northeastern Indiana Athletic Conference =

The Northeastern Indiana Athletic Conference was an IHSAA-Sanctioned Athletic Conference from 1927 to 1988.

== Former members ==
School	Location	Mascot	Colors	# / County	Year joined	Previous conference	Year left	Conference joined
Auburn	Auburn	Red Devils		17; DeKalb	1927; 1960	DeKalb County; Independents	1953; 1967	Independents none (consolidated into DeKalb)
Bluffton	Bluffton	Tigers		90; Wells	1927	Wells County	1989	Allen County
Columbia; City	Columbia City	Eagles		92; Whitley	1927	Whitley County	1989	Northeast Hoosier
Decatur	Decatur	Yellow Jackets		01; Adams	1927		1967	none (consolidated into Bellmont)
Fort Wayne Central	Fort Wayne	Tigers		02; Allen	1927	Independents	1940	Ft. Wayne City
Fort Wayne North Side	Fort Wayne	Redskins		02; Allen	1927	Independents	1940	Ft. Wayne City
Fort Wayne South Side	Fort Wayne	Archers		02; Allen	1927	Independents	1940	Ft. Wayne City
Garrett	Garrett	Railroaders		17; De Kalb	1927; 1941	DeKalb County; State Corner	1935; 1981	State Corner; Northeast Corner
Huntington	Huntington	Vikings		35; Huntington	1927	Independents	1932	Central Indiana
Kendallville	Kendallville	Red Devils		57; Noble	1927	independent	1966	none (consolidated into East Noble)
New Haven	New Haven	Bulldogs		02; Allen	1945	Independents	1989	Northeast Hoosier
Warsaw	Warsaw	Tigers		43; Kosciusko	1945	Central Indiana	1953	Central Indiana
Concordia Lutheran	Fort Wayne	Cadets		02; Allen	1955	Ft. Wayne City	1975	Summit
Angola	Angola	Hornets		76; Steuben	1959	Steuben County	1989	Northeast Corner
Elmhurst	Fort Wayne	Trojans		02; Allen	1960	Allen County	1966	Ft. Wayne City Series
Berne	Berne	Bears		01; Adams	1965	Eastern Indiana (EIC)	1966	none (consolidated into South Adams)
East Noble	Kendallville	Knights		57; Noble	1966	none (new school)	1989	Northeast Hoosier
South Adams	Berne	Starfires		01; Adams	1966	none (new school)	1989	Allen County
Bellmont	Decatur	Braves		01; Adams	1967	none (new school)	1989	Northeast Hoosier
DeKalb	Waterloo	Barons		17; DeKalb	1967	none (new school)	1989	Northeast Hoosier
Homestead	Fort Wayne	Spartans		02; Allen	1975	Allen County	1989	Northeast Hoosier

== Divisional Format ==
From 1973 to 1975, the conference used a two division format. The divisions were:

East-West	North-South
Bellmont	Angola
Columbia City	Bluffton
DeKalb	East Noble
Fort Wayne Concordia Lutheran (1973–74); Homestead (1975)	Garrett
New Haven	South Adams

== Resources ==
- Northeastern Indiana Athletic Conference Football
- NEIC
