= Allen County Athletic Conference =

High school conference in Indiana, US

- Founded: 1956
- Region: Indiana

Locations
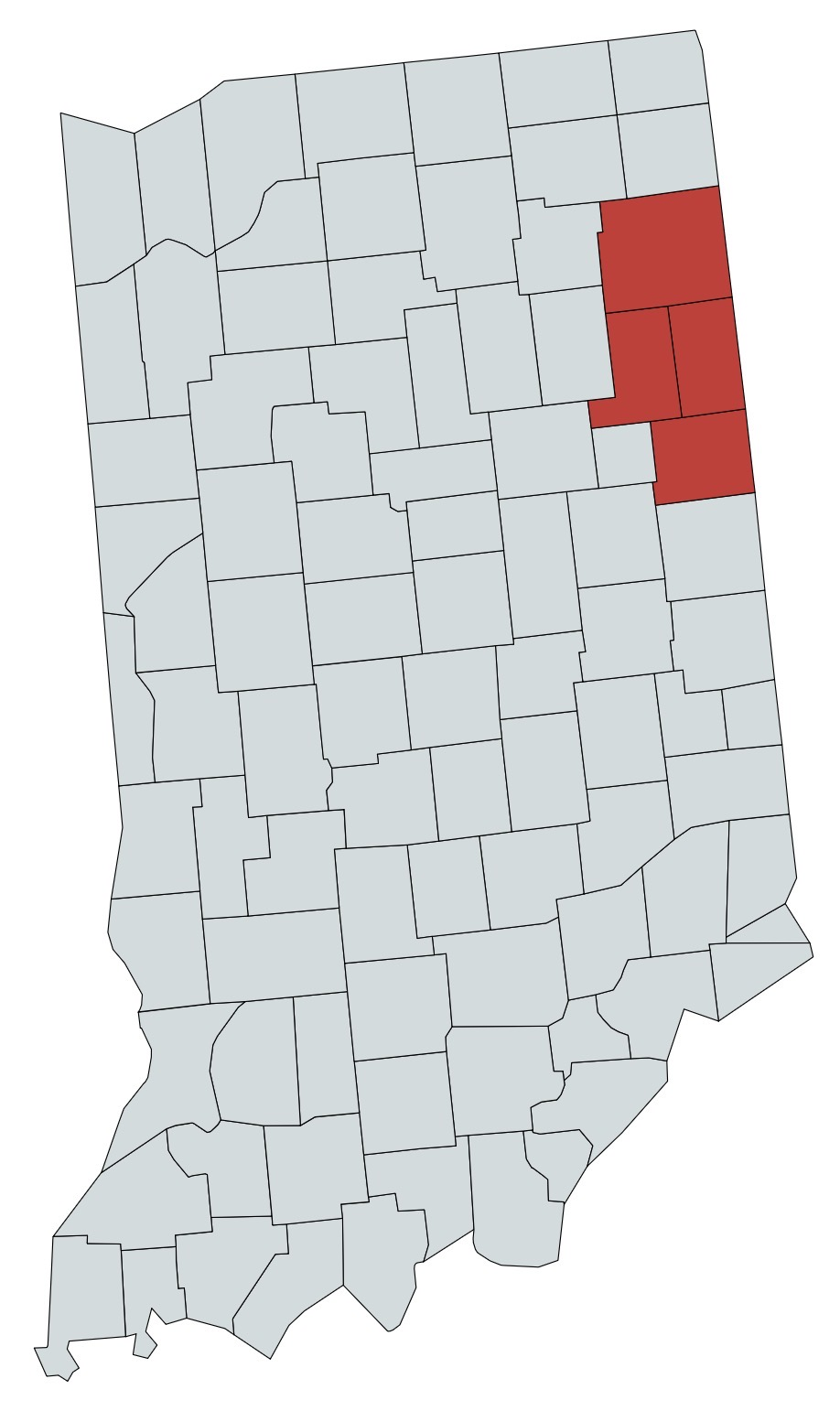
- Allen County Athletic Conference members in Indiana

The Allen County Athletic Conference (ACAC) is a seven-member Indiana High School Athletic Association (IHSAA) conference. While all of its charter schools are and were located in Allen County, it also has member schools from Adams, Jay, and Wells counties. The ACAC, along with the Porter County Conference, are the only two county conferences left in existence.

== History ==
The Allen County Athletic Conference began with nine schools in Allen County in 1956. The schools were smaller, rural schools, with the exception of Elmhurst, the sole Fort Wayne school that wasn't included in the Fort Wayne City Series. The conference was hit hard by consolidation, and the nine original schools were down to four by the 1968 season (and two of those were new consolidations). The conference responded by going outside county borders by admitting Norwell (itself a newly consolidated school) in 1967, followed by Adams Central, Churubusco, and Eastside in 1968. The rebooted conference now expanded well outside of the Allen County footprint, including schools from Adams, DeKalb, Wells, and Whitley counties. All of the schools now sponsored football, and competition in that sport began in 1969.

The conference went to a two division format in 1971 with the addition of new school Homestead and Southern Wells. That format ended in 1975, as Homestead left for the Northeastern Indiana Athletic Conference, followed by Eastside leaving for the Northeast Corner Conference in 1980. The breakup of the NEIAC in 1989 led to a wide-scale realignment of conferences in Northeast Indiana, as schools looked to realign themselves with rivals of similar enrolments. The ACAC became the home for mid-sized schools, while the Northeast Corner housed small schools, and the newly formed Northeast Hoosier Conference became the stable for the largest non-Fort Wayne schools. Carroll and Norwell left that year for the NEHC, while Churubusco left for the NECC. They were replaced by NEIAC schools Bluffton and South Adams. Garrett, becoming too large for the Northeast Corner, moved to the Allen County league in 2005.

Jay County joined the conference beginning with the 2014–15 school year. However, the conference shrank down to seven schools in 2015, as Garrett moved to the Northeast Corner Conference in 2014, and Leo joined six of the eight Northeast Hoosier Conference high schools in a new conference (Northeast 8) in 2015.

== Membership ==
=== Current members ===
School	Location	Mascot	Colors	Enrollment 26–27	IHSAA Class/ Football Class	County	Year joined	Previous conference
Adams; Central^{1}	Monroe	Flying Jets		414	2A/3A^{2}	01; Adams	1965	Eastern Wabash Valley
Bluffton	Bluffton	Tigers		548	3A/3A	90; Wells	1989	Northeastern Indiana
Heritage	Monroeville	Patriots		565	3A/3A	02; Allen	1968	none (new school)
Jay County	Portland	Patriots		839	3A/4A	38; Jay	2014	Independents (Olympic 2010)
South; Adams	Berne	Starfires		326	2A/1A	01; Adams	1989	Northeastern Indiana
Southern; Wells	Poneto	Raiders		250	1A/1A	90; Wells	1971	Independents
Woodlan^{3}	Woodburn	Warriors		538	3A/3A	02; Allen	1956	Independents
Concordia^{4}	Fort Wayne	Cadets		735	3A/3A	02; Allen	2027	Summit

1. Adams Central played in the ACAC and the EWVC concurrently for 1965–66, the final year for the EWVC.
2. Adams Central is playing in 3A for football due to IHSAA Rule 2-5.
3. Woodlan was known as Woodburn before 1959.
4. Concordia Lutheran announced their decision to join the ACAC on June 8, 2026, because the conference "provides a stable environment that supports the continued growth of our athletic programs".

=== Former members ===
School	Location	Mascot	Colors	County	Year joined	Previous conference	Year left	Conference joined
Arcola	Arcola	Aces		02; Allen	1956		1968	none (consolidated into Carroll (FW))
Elmhurst	Fort Wayne	Trojans		02; Allen	1956		1960	Northeastern Indiana
Harlan	Harlan	Hawks		02; Allen	1956		1965	none (consolidated into Woodlan)
Hoagland	Hoagland	Wildcats		02; Allen	1956		1968	none (consolidated into Heritage)
Huntertown	Huntertown	Wildcats		02; Allen	1956		1968	none (consolidated into Carroll (FW))
Lafayette Central^{1}	Nine Mile	Pirates		02; Allen	1956		1963	none (consolidated into Roanoke)
Leo	Leo	Lions		02Allen	1956		2015	Northeast Eight
Monroeville	Monroeville	Cubs		02; Allen	1956		1968	none (consolidated into Heritage)
Ossian	Ossian	Bears		90; Wells	1966	Eastern Wabash Valley	1967	none (consolidated into Norwell)
Norwell	Ossian	Knights		90; Wells	1967	none (new school)	1989	Northeast Hoosier
Carroll (Fort Wayne)	Fort Wayne	Chargers		02; Allen	1968	none (new school)	1989	Northeast Hoosier
Churubusco	Churubusco	Eagles		92; Whitley	1968	Independents (WCC 1958)	1989	Northeast Corner
Eastside	Butler	Blazers		17; DeKalb	1968	Independents (SCC 1967)	1980	Northeast Corner
Homestead	Fort Wayne	Spartans		02; Allen	1971	none (new school)	1975	Northeastern Indiana
Garrett	Garrett	Railroaders		17; DeKalb	2005	Northeast Corner	2014	Northeast Corner

1. Lafayette Central became part of Roanoke High School in 1963. Roanoke itself consolidated into Huntington North in 1966, taking Lafayette Township with it. The township then split off from HNHS to become part of Southwest Allen County Schools in 1971.

== Division Format 1971-75 ==
North	South
Churubusco	Adams Central
Fort Wayne Carroll	Heritage
Eastside	Homestead
Leo	Norwell
Woodlan	Southern Wells

== Sponsored Sports ==
Boys	Girls
Baseball	Basketball
Basketball	Cross Country
Cross Country	Golf
Football	Soccer
Golf	Softball
Soccer	Swimming
Swimming	Tennis
Tennis	Track & Field
Track & Field	Volleyball
Wrestling	

== Conference championships ==
=== Football ===
#	Team	Seasons
14	Adams Central	1969, 1972 (S)*, 1981, 1994, 1995, 1997*, 1999, 2017, 2018, 2021, 2022, 2023, 2024, 2025
14	Woodlan	1970*, 1971 (N)*, 1972 (N, C), 1973 (N), 1974 (N, C)*, 1975, 1982, 1984, 1985, 1986, 1989*, 1996, 2015, 2016
11	Leo	1971 (N)*, 1974 (N)*, 1977, 1997*, 2002, 2009, 2010, 2011, 2012*, 2013, 2014
10	Heritage	1970*, 1972 (S)*, 1998, 2001, 2002*, 2003, 2004, 2005, 2006, 2012*
6	South Adams	1990, 1991, 1992, 1993, 2019, 2020
5	Norwell	1971 (S, C), 1980, 1983, 1987, 1988
3	Carroll (FW)	1976, 1978, 1979
2	Garrett	2007, 2012*
2	Homestead	1973 (S), 1974 (S)
2	Southern Wells	2000, 2008
1	Bluffton	1989*
1	Churubusco	1971 (N)*
1	Eastside	1974 (N)*
0	Jay County	

- 1971-74: N = North Division champions, S = South Division champions, C = title game champions (not held in 1973).

=== Boys basketball ===
#	Team	Seasons
24	Leo	1957, 1960, 1961, 1963*, 1964, 1966*, 1971, 1972, 1979*, 1980, 1993, 1994, 1995, 1998*, 1999, 2000, 2001, 2004, 2005*, 2006, 2011*, 2013*, 2015
11	Norwell	1973, 1978*, 1979*, 1981*, 1982, 1983*, 1984*, 1986, 1987*, 1988
10	Bluffton	1998*, 2002, 2003, 2008, 2009*, 2010, 2011*, 2013, 2016*, 2020
9	Carroll (FW)	1969, 1974, 1977, 1978*, 1981*, 1983*, 1984*, 1985, 1987*
5	Jay County	2016*, 2018, 2019, 2022, 2023*
4	Woodlan	1996, 2007, 2014, 2017*
4	Heritage	2005*, 2009*, 2017*, 2021
3	Southern Wells	1975, 1976, 1992
3	Adams Central	2012, 2023*, 2024
1	Huntertown	1966*
1	South Adams	1997
0	Arcola	
0	Churubusco	
0	Eastside	
0	Elmhurst	
0	Garrett	
0	Harlan	
0	Hoagland	
0	Homestead	
0	Lafayette Central	
0	Monroeville	
0	Ossian	
0	Woodburn	

- Champions from 1958–59 to 1990-91 not listed are unverified.

=== Girls basketball ===
#	Team	Seasons
8	Leo	1978, 2001, 2002, 2004*, 2008*, 2010, 2012, 2013*
8	Jay County	2015, 2016, 2017*, 2018, 2019, 2021, 2022, 2023
5	Garrett	2006*, 2007, 2008*, 2011, 2014
5	Southern Wells	2004*, 2005*, 2006*, 2009, 2013
2	Woodlan	2005*, 2020
2	Heritage	2003, 2006*
1	Norwell	1976
1	South Adams	2017*
0	Adams Central	
0	Bluffton	
0	Carroll (FW)	
0	Churubusco	
0	Eastside	
0	Homestead	

- Champions from beginning of competition (ca. 1974–75) until 2000 not listed are unverified.

=== Wrestling ===
#	Team	Seasons
27	Adams Central	1975, 1978*, 1979, 1981, 1982, 1983, 1984, 1985, 1986, 1987*, 1988, 1989, 1990, 1991, 1992, 1993, 1994, 1995, 1996, 2000, 2004, 2005, 2006, 2012, 2013, 2015, 2016, 2018, 2019
5	Carroll (FW)	1974, 1976, 1977, 1978*, 1987*
3	Leo	2003, 2007, 2014
3	Woodlan	1972, 1973, 2001
2	Bluffton	1999, 2002
2	Garrett	2009, 2010
2	South Adams	2008, 2011
0	Churubusco	
0	Eastside	
0	Heritage	
0	Homestead	
1	Jay County	2023
0	Norwell	
0	Southern Wells	

Only tournament champions listed.

== State titles ==
=== Adams Central Flying Jets (2) ===
- 2000 Football (A)
- 2024 Football (2A)

=== Bluffton Tigers (5) ===
- D'Wayne Eskridge - 200 M Dash (2015, 2016), 100 M Dash (2016)
- Randy Pursley - 130 lbs Wrestling (1999)
- Ben Sprunger - 130 lbs Wrestling (2000)

=== Garrett Railroaders (1) ===
- 1974 Football (A)

=== Heritage Patriots (1) ===
- 1982 girls basketball

=== Leo Lions (1) ===
- 2014 Girls Softball (3A)
- 2008 Justin Woods, Leo 33-0 215lb State Wrestling Champion

=== South Adams Starfires (1) ===
• Davona Runkel - Girls shot put (1986)

=== Southern Wells Raiders (1) ===
- 2001 Football (A)
