= Hoosier Plains Conference =

The Hoosier Plains Conference is an Indiana-based high school athletic conference formed in 2017.

- On January 16, 2024, it was announced that Hamilton Community High School, a founding member of the Northeast Corner Conference, would be joining the Hoosier Plains in the fall of 2024.

== Current members ==
School	Location	Mascot	Colors	Enrollment 24-25	IHSAA Class	County	Year joined	Previous conference
Bethany; Christian	Goshen	Bruins		130	1A	20; Elkhart	2020	Independent
Career Academy South Bend	South Bend	Trailblazers		448	2A	71; St. Joseph	2020	Independent
Elkhart; Christian	Elkhart	Eagles		170	1A	20; Elkhart	2020	Independent
Fort Wayne; Canterbury	Fort Wayne	Cavaliers		241	AA	02; Allen	2025	Independent
Hamilton	Hamilton	Marines		101	1A	76; Steuben	2024	Northeast Corner Conference
Lakeland Christian	Winona Lake	Cougars		101	1A	43; Kosciusko	2020	Independent
Trinity at Greenlawn	South Bend	Titans		127	1A	71; St. Joseph	2020	Independent

== Former members ==
School	Location	Mascot	Colors	County
Argos	Argos	Dragons		50; Marshall
Community Baptist	South Bend	Cougars		71; St. Joseph
Granger Christian	Granger	Knights		71; St. Joseph
Howe	Howe	Wildcats		44; La Grange

== Conference championships ==
=== Boys basketball ===
#	Team	Seasons
3	Elkhart Christian	2021*, 2022*, 2025*
3	Bethany Christian	2023*, 2024, 2025*
2	Argos	2021*, 2022*
1	Lakeland Christian	2023*
0	Career Academy	
0	Hamilton	
0	Trinity	

=== Girls basketball ===
#	Team	Seasons
3	Bethany Christian	2021, 2023, 2024
1	Argos	2022
1	Elkhart Christian	2025
0	Career Academy	
0	Hamilton	
0	Lakeland Christian	
0	Trinity	

=== Boys Soccer ===
#	Team	Seasons
2	Argos	2020, 2021*
2	Bethany Christian	2022, 2023
2	Trinity	2021*, 2024
0	Elkhart Christian	
0	Hamilton	
0	Lakeland Christian	

=== Girls Soccer ===
#	Team	Seasons
2	Argos	2020, 2021
1	Bethany Christian	2022
0	Elkhart Christian	
0	Hamilton	
0	Lakeland Christian	
0	Trinity	

=== Volleyball ===
#	Team	Seasons
3	Elkhart Christian	2021, 2023, 2024
2	Bethany Christian	2020, 2022
0	Argos	
0	Lakeland Christian	
0	Career Academy	
0	Hamilton	
0	Trinity	
