= Northeast Corner Conference =

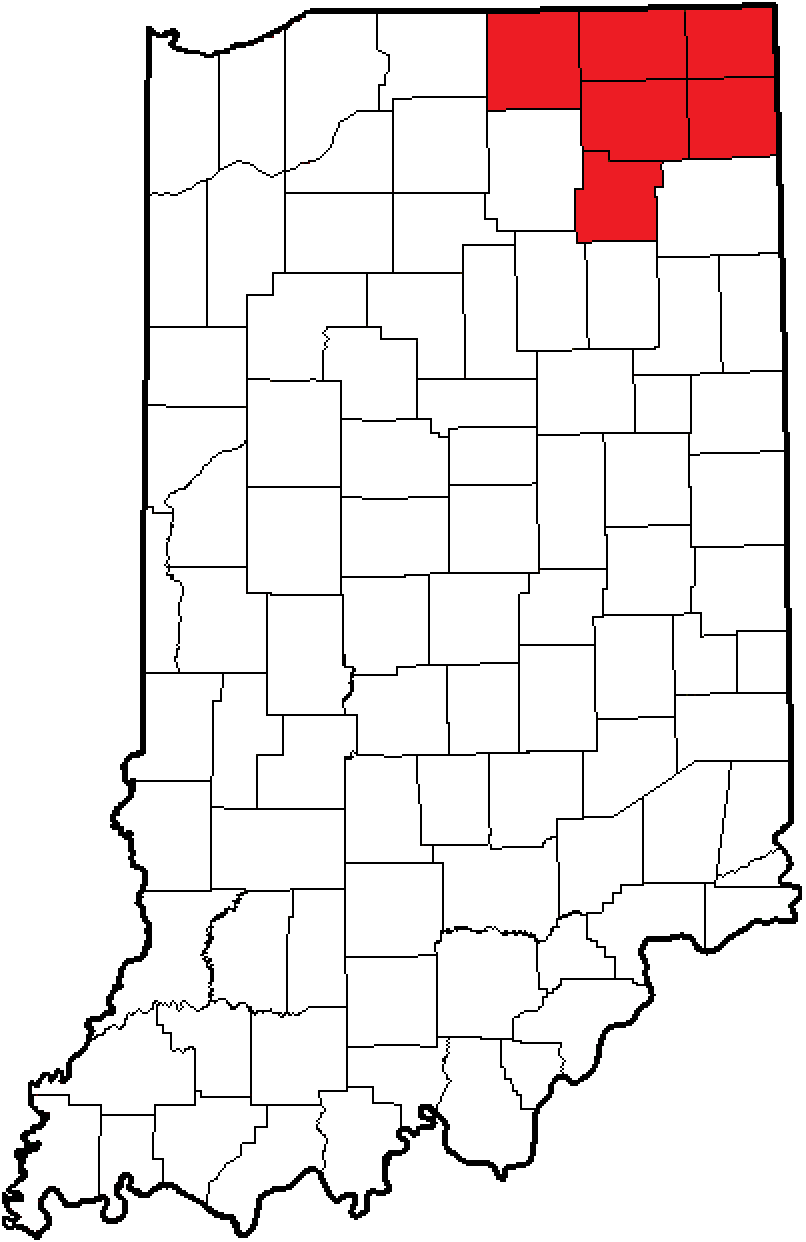
The Northeast Corner Conference in Indiana

The Northeast Corner Conference is a twelve-member Indiana High School Athletic Association (IHSAA)-sanctioned conference based in Northeast Indiana. Its schools are located within DeKalb, Elkhart, LaGrange, Noble, Steuben, and Whitley counties.

== History ==
The conference was formed as the Bi-County Conference in 1964, as the formations of Lakeland and Prairie Heights left Lagrange and Steuben Counties with only seven schools total. Angola already competed in the Northeastern Indiana Athletic Conference, and Lakeland decided to compete independently. The five remaining schools started the conference, though Shipshewanna-Scott and Topeka were due to consolidate by 1966, while Fremont and Hamilton also participated in the State Corner Conference, while staying with their other Steuben County schools. Meanwhile, at that point the five remaining Noble County schools were set to consolidate into two schools themselves, and were also needing new conference affiliation. They joined with the Bi-County Conference teams, and changed their name to the current NECC. Howe Military also joined that year.

Other schools to join since then were Lakeland in 1974, Fairfield in 1980, Garrett in 1981, Eastside in 1983, and Angola and Churubusco in 1989. Howe Military left in 1980, and Garrett followed in 2005 (before rejoining in 2014).

On January 16, 2024, it was announced that Hamilton Community High School, a founding member of the Northeast Corner Conference, would be joining the Hoosier Plains Conference in the fall of 2024.

== Membership ==
School	Location	Mascot	Colors	Enrollment 24–25	IHSAA Class BB/FB	# / County	Year joined	Previous conference
Angola	Angola	Hornets		741	3A/3A	76; Steuben	1989	Northeastern Indiana
Central; Noble	Albion	Cougars		385	2A/2A	57; Noble	1968	none (new school)
Churubusco	Churubusco	Eagles		378	2A/2A	92; Whitley	1989	Allen County
Eastside	Butler	Blazer		384	2A/2A	17; DeKalb	1983	Allen County
Fairfield	Goshen	Falcons		570	3A/3A	20; Elkhart	1980	Northern State
Fremont^{1}	Fremont	Eagles		283	1A/1A	76; Steuben	1964	Steuben County
Garrett^{2}	Garrett	Railroaders		556	3A/3A	17; DeKalb	1981; 2014	Northeastern Indiana; Allen County
Lakeland	LaGrange	Lakers		540	2A/3A	44; LaGrange	1973	Independents
Prairie; Heights	LaGrange	Panthers		421	2A/2A	44; LaGrange	1964	none (new school)
West; Noble	Ligonier	Chargers		718	3A/3A	57; Noble	1967	none (new school)
Westview	Topeka	Warriors		343	2A/N/A	44; LaGrange	1966	none (new school)

1. Fremont was concurrent members of the Bi-County and State Corner conferences from 1964 to 1967.
2. Garrett was a member of the Allen County Athletic Conference from 2005 to 2014.

== Former members ==
School	Location	Mascot	Colors	# / County	Year joined	Previous conference	Year left	Conference joined
Shipshewanna-Scott	Shipshewanna	Indians		44; LaGrange	1964	LaGrange County	1966	none (consolidated into Westview)
Topeka	Topeka	Bears		44; LaGrange	1964	LaGrange County	1966	none (consolidated into Westview)
Albion	Albion	Trojans		57; Noble	1966	Noble County	1968	none (consolidated into Central Noble)
Cromwell	Cromwell	Spartans		57; Noble	1966	Noble County	1967	none (consolidated into West Noble)
Howe Military	Howe	Cadets		44; La Grange	1966	Independents	1980	Independents (MLC 1984)
Ligonier	Ligonier	Red Raiders		57; Noble	1966	Noble County	1967	none (consolidated into West Noble)
Wawaka	Wawaka	Chargers		57; Noble	1966	Noble County	1967	none (consolidated into West Noble)
Wolf Lake	Wolf Lake	Wolves		57; Noble	1966	Noble County	1968	none (consolidated into Central Noble)
Hamilton	Hamilton	Marines		76; Steuben	1964	Steuben County	2023	Hoosier Plains Conference

=== Football divisions ===
With Garrett returning to the conference, football will return to the divisional format used between 1989 and 2005. The divisions have always been labeled as Division I (small school) and Division II (large school).

1989–2005		2014–	
I	II	I	II
Central Noble	Angola	Central Noble	Angola
Churubusco	Garrett	Churubusco	Fairfield
Eastside	Lakeland	Eastside	Garrett
Fairfield	Prairie Heights	Fremont	Lakeland
Fremont	West Noble	Prairie Heights	West Noble

== Conference champions ==
(Note) These are LEAGUE champs from 1966–present

=== Football ===
Titles	School	Years
16	West Noble	1968*, 1974, 1975, 1978, 1979, 1981, 1983, 1985*, 1989 (II), 1999 (II), 2000 (II), 2002 (II)*, 2005, 2014 (II), 2019(II), 2023(II)
18	Eastside	1988, 1989 (I), 1990 (I), 1991 (I), 1994 (I), 1995 (I)*, 1999 (I), 2002 (I)*, 2004 (I), 2014 (I), 2015 (I), 2016 (I), 2017* (I), 2019 (I), 2020 (I), 2021(I), 2022(I), 2023(I)
11	Lakeland	1982, 1984, 1986, 1990 (II)*, 1991 (II)*, 1993 (II)*, 1994 (II), 1995 (II), 1996 (II), 2009*, 2013*
10	Churubusco	1992 (I), 1993 (I), 1995 (I)*, 2002 (I)*, 2009*, 2010*, 2011, 2012, 2017* (I), 2018 (I)
10	Angola	1992 (II), 1993 (II)*, 1997 (II), 1998 (II), 2001 (II), 2002 (II)*, 2010*, 2017 (II), 2018 (II), 2022 (II)
8	Garrett	1990 (II)*, 1991 (II)*, 1993 (II)*, 2002 (II)*, 2003 (II), 2004 (II), 2015 (II)*, 2016 (II)
8	Prairie Heights	1969, 1970, 1971, 1972, 1973*, 1976, 1977, 1985*
9	Fairfield	1996 (I), 1997 (I)*, 2006, 2007, 2008, 2013*, 2015* (II), 2020 (II), 2021(II)
6	Central Noble	1980, 2000 (I), 2001 (I), 2002 (I)*, 2003 (I), 2017* (I)
4	Fremont	1968*, 1987, 1997 (I)*, 1998 (I)
1	Hamilton	1973*
0	Howe	

Howe (then Howe Military) left in 1980. Hamilton dropped football in 1986.

=== Boys basketball ===
Titles	School	Years
29	Westview	1973*, 1976, 1977*, 1979, 1980*, 1985, 1986*, 1987*, 1988, 1989, 1990, 1991, 1993, 1994, 1997*, 1998*, 1999, 2000, 2007*, 2008, 2010*, 2011, 2012, 2013, 2014, 2017*, 2018*, 2019, 2020*, 2021*
12	Lakeland	1975, 1978, 1980*, 1986*, 1992*, 2001, 2003*, 2004*, 2005, 2006*, 2009, 2010*
7	Fairfield	1981, 1982, 1995, 1998*, 2007*, 2018*
6	Angola	1996, 1997*, 2002, 2003*, 2006*, 2016
5	West Noble	1969*, 1971, 1972, 1973*, 1986*
5	Central Noble	1970, 1974, 1977*, 1998*, 2021*
4	Garrett	1984, 1986*, 2003*, 2004*
2	Fremont	1992*, 2011
2	Eastside	1983, 2017*
2	Prairie Heights	1987*, 2013*
2	Hamilton	1969*,1992*
2	Wolf Lake	1967, 1968
2	Churubusco	2015, 2020*

=== Girls basketball ===
Titles	School	Years
13	Prairie Heights	1979, 1982, 1986, 1987, 1988, 1989, 1990, 1991, 1992*, 1993, 1995*, 1996, 1997
9	Angola	2000, 2001, 2002, 2003, 2007, 2010*, 2012, 2017, 2020
9	Westview	1976, 1977, 2005*, 2006, 2008, 2013, 2014, 2015, 2016
7	Lakeland	1980*, 1981, 1983, 1984, 1985, 1995*,1998
5	Garrett	1994,1999, 2004, 2005*, 2021
3	Fairfield	2010*, 2011, 2018
2	West Noble	1978, 2009
1	Hamilton	1980*
1	Eastside	1992*
1	Central Noble	2019
0	Churubusco	
0	Fremont	

=== Boys Baseball ===
Titles	School	Years
11	Westview	1970*, 1977*, 1978, 1981, 1982, 1983, 1984*, 2006, 2007*, 2008, 2016*, 2017
10	Churubusco	1992*, 1993, 2000*, 2001, 2002, 2003, 2005*, 2014, 2015, 2016*
7	Angola	1997, 2004, 2007*, 2012*, 2013, 2016*, 2018*
7	Hamilton	1968*, 1974, 1979, 1984*, 1986, 1994*, 2000*
6	Eastside	1985, 1989, 1990, 1991*, 2016*, 2019
6	Lakeland	1975, 1976, 1977*, 1979, 1998, 2018*
6	Fairfield	1996, 2007*, 2009, 2010, 2011, 2012*
6	West Noble	1967, 1968*, 1980, 1994*, 1995, 1999
5	Prairie Heights	1969, 1970*, 1971, 1972, 1973
4	Garrett	1987, 1988, 1991*
2	Central Noble	1998, 2005*
1	Fremont	1992*

No champion was crowned in 2020 due to the COVID-19 pandemic

=== Softball ===
Titles	School	Years
14	Eastside	1993, 1994, 1995, 1996, 1997, 2000, 2001, 2002, 2003, 2004, 2005, 2008, 2013, 2016
8	Garrett	1987, 1988, 1989, 1990, 1991, 1992, 1998, 1999
5	Angola	2009, 2010, 2011, 2014, 2015
3	Churubusco	1996, 2004, 2006
2	Central Noble	2017, 2018
1	Lakeland	2012
1	Fairfield	2007
1	Prairie Heights	2005
1	Fremont	2019
0	West Noble	
0	Hamilton	
0	Westview	

No champion was crowned in 2020 due to COVID-19 pandemic

=== Volleyball ===
Titles	School	Years
14	Fairfield	1981, 2000, 2001, 2002, 2003, 2006, 2007, 2008, 2009, 2010, 2011, 2012, 2013, 2015
7	Angola	1996, 1998, 2000, 2003, 2017, 2018, 2019
6	Prairie Heights	1985, 1988, 1989, 1990, 1992, 2005
6	Westview	1978, 1980, 1982, 2013, 2014, 2015
6	West Noble	1984, 1990, 1991, 1997, 2000, 2016
5	Fremont	1975, 1976, 1978, 1979, 1995
5	Lakeland	1978, 1994, 1999, 2003, 2020
3	Garrett	1992, 1993, 2015
1	Central Noble	2004
1	Eastside	1983
0	Churubusco	
0	Hamilton	

=== Boys Tennis ===
Titles	School	Years
17	Fairfield	1980, 1985, 1988, 1992, 1993, 1994, 1995*, 1997, 1998, 1999, 2000, 2001, 2010, 2012, 2013, 2014, 2016
10	Westview	1991, 2002, 2004, 2005, 2006, 2007, 2008, 2018, 2019, 2020
7	Lakeland	1979*, 1981, 1982, 1989, 1990, 1991, 1996*
6	Angola	1989, 2003, 2009, 2011, 2015, 2017
4	West Noble	1983, 1984, 1995*, 1996*
1	Howe Military	1979*
1	Central Noble	1979*
0	Churubusco	
0	Prairie Heights	
0	Fremont	
0	Hamilton	
0	Eastside	
0	Garrett	

=== Girls Tennis ===
Titles	School	Years
21	Fairfield	1991, 1993*, 1994, 1995, 1996, 1997, 1999, 2000, 2001, 2004, 2007, 2008, 2009, 2010, 2011, 2012, 2013, 2014, 2015, 2016, 2018
6	Westview	1998, 2002, 2003, 2005, 2006, 2017
4	West Noble	1988, 1989, 1990, 2019*
2	Angola	1987, 2019*
1	Lakeland	1992
1	Central Noble	1993*
1	Eastside	1986
0	Churubusco	
0	Prairie Heights	
0	Fremont	
0	Hamilton	
0	Garrett	

No champion was crowned in 2020 due to COVID-19 pandemic

Wrestling West noble 2006, 2007

External links

== Resources ==
- IHSAA Conferences
- IHSAA Directory
- E.T. Pearl's Basketball Corner Data Catalogue
