= Lakeland Christian Academy =

Lakeland Christian Academy is the name of several schools in the United States or Canada:

- Lakeland Christian Academy (Alberta), in Cold Lake, Alberta, Canada
- Lakeland Christian Academy (Kentucky), in Moorehead, Kentucky, USA
- Lakeland Christian Academy (Texas), in Lewisville, Texas, USA
- Lakeland Christian Academy (Indiana), in Winona Lake, Indiana, USA

== See also ==
- Lakeland Christian School
- Lakeland (disambiguation)
