= Lakeland =

Lakeland is primarily a toponym. It may refer to:

== Places ==
=== Australia ===
- Lakeland, Queensland

=== Canada ===
- Lakeland (electoral district), a federal electoral district in Alberta
- Lakeland County, a former municipal district in Alberta
- District of Lakeland No. 521, Saskatchewan, a rural municipality
- Lakeland Provincial Park and Recreation Area, Canada

=== Finland ===
- Finnish Lakeland, a landscape region

=== Turkey ===
- Turkish Lakeland, an area of south west Anatolia

=== United Kingdom ===
- English Lakeland, an alternative name for the Lake District, a mountainous area in north west England
- South Lakeland, a former local government district in Cumbria
- Lakeland Wildlife Oasis, a small zoological collection near the town of Milnthorpe, Cumbria, England

=== United States ===
- Lakeland, Baltimore
- Lakeland, Florida
  - Lakeland Civic Center
- Lakeland, Georgia
- Lakeland, Indiana
- Lakeland, Kentucky
- Lakeland, Louisiana
- Lakeland, Michigan
- Lakeland, Minnesota
- Lakeland, Missouri
- Lakeland, New Jersey
- Lakeland, New York
- Lakeland, Suffolk County, New York
- Lakeland, Tennessee
- Lakeland, Wisconsin
- Lakeland North, Washington
- Lakeland South, Washington
- Lakeland Village, California
- Metro Lakeland, a name that was coined in the 1960s for an area of southern Illinois

Lakeland may also refer to:

== People ==
- Christine Lakeland (born 1954), American musician/songwriter
- Paul Lakeland, American theologian
- William Lakeland (1847–1922), Australian explorer and prospector

== Schools ==
- Lakeland Elementary School (disambiguation)
- Lakeland High School (disambiguation)
- Lakeland College (disambiguation)
- Lakeland Christian Academy (disambiguation)
- Lakeland Christian School, a private school located in Lakeland, Florida

== Art and entertainment ==
- Lakeland: Journeys into the Soul of Canada, a 2009 award-winning book by Canadian author, Allan Casey

== Other uses ==
- Lakeland limequat, a cultivar of limequat
- Lakeland Terrier, a dog breed
- Lakeland (company), a kitchenware company in the United Kingdom
- Lakeland Classic, a golf tournament on the Nationwide Tour from 1997 to 2000
- Lakeland PBS, a collective brand of 2 television stations in Bemidji and Brainerd, Minnesota

== See also ==
- Lakelands (disambiguation)
