= Lakeland High School =

== Lakeland High School ==
Lakeland High School may refer to:

- Lakeland Senior High School (Florida), Lakeland, Florida
- Lakeland High School (Idaho), Rathdrum, Idaho
- Lakeland Junior/Senior High School (Indiana), LaGrange, Indiana
- Lakeland High School (Maryland), Lakeland, Maryland, now in College Park
- Lakeland High School (Michigan), White Lake Township, Michigan
- Lakeland High School (Missouri), Deepwater, Missouri
- Lakeland Regional High School, Wanaque, New Jersey
- Lakeland High School (New York), Shrub Oak, New York
- Lakeland Junior Senior High School, Lakeland School District, Jermyn, Pennsylvania
- Lakeland High School (Virginia), Suffolk, Virginia
- Lakeland Senior High School (Western Australia), South Lake, Western Australia
- Lakeland Union High School, Minocqua, Wisconsin

== Lakeland School District ==
Lakeland school district may refer to:

- Lakeland School District (Pennsylvania), a public school district located in northern Lackawanna County, Pennsylvania
- Lakeland Central School District, a public school district in New York State
- Lakeland School System, a municipal school district in Lakeland, Tennessee in Greater Memphis

== See also ==
- Lakeland College (disambiguation)
- Lakeland (disambiguation)
