= Eastern Indiana Conference =

Former high school athletics conference

The Eastern Indiana Conference existed in Northeastern Indiana from 1953 to 1975. It consisted of schools from Adams, Blackford, Delaware, Jay, and Wells Counties. The conference is notable for having two county conferences (Adams and Jay) fold into it, in 1957 and 1967, respectively. However, two years after the Jay County Conference folded into the EIC, the four Jay County schools were the only programs left in the conference.

This conference should not be confused with the Eastern Indiana Athletic Conference, which still exists and is based in southeastern Indiana.

== Membership ==
School	Location	Mascot	Colors	County	Year joined	Previous conference	Year left	Conference joined
Albany^{1}	Albany	Wildcats		18; Delaware	1953	Delaware County	1968	none (consolidated into Delta)
Berne^{2}	Berne	Bears		01; Adams	1953; 1962	Adams County; Eastern Wabash Valley	1959; 1965	Eastern Wabash Valley; Northeastern Indiana
Bryant^{3}	Bryant	Owls		39; Jay	1953	Jay County	1975	none (consolidated into Jay County)
Geneva^{2}	Geneva	Cardinals		01; Adams	1953	Adams County	1959	Eastern Wabash Valley
Hartford Township^{2}	Linn Grove	Gorillas		01; Adams	1953	Adams County	1963	none (consolidated into Geneva)
Monmouth^{2}	Monmouth	Eagles		01; Adams	1953; 1966	Adams County; Eastern Wabash Valley	1959; 1967	Eastern Wabash Valley none (consolidated into Bellmont)
Montpelier	Montpelier	Pacers		05; Blackford	1953	Blackford County	1969	none (consolidated into Blackford)
Pennville^{3}	Pennville	Bulldogs		38; Jay	1953	Jay County	1975	none (consolidated into Jay County)
Redkey^{3}	Redkey	Wolves		38; Jay	1953	Jay County	1975	none (consolidated into Jay County)
Roll	Roll	Red Rollers		05; Blackford	1953	Blackford County	1962	none (consolidated into Montpelier)
Adams; Central^{2}	Monroe	Flying Jets		01; Adams	1954	Adams County	1959	Eastern Wabash Valley
Lancaster Central^{4}	Ossian	Knights		90; Wells	1954; 1966	Wells County; Eastern Wabash Valley	1959; 1967	Eastern Wabash Valley none (consolidated into Norwell)
Dunkirk	Dunkirk	Speedcats		38; Jay	1967	Jay County	1975	none (consolidated into Jay County)

1. Albany played concurrently in the DCC and ACC from 1953 until the school closed in 1968.
2. Schools played concurrently in the ACC and EIC from date entered until the county conference folded into the EIC in 1957.
3. Schools played concurrently in EIC and JCC until 1967, when conference folded into EIC.
4. Lancaster Central played concurrently in the EIC and WCC from 1954 to 1959.
