= Eastern Wabash Valley Conference =

- Association: IHSAA
- First season: 1959
- Folded: 1966
- No. of teams: 5–6
- Region: Northeast Indiana

The Eastern Wabash Valley Conference was a short-lived IHSAA-sanctioned conference located in Northeast Indiana. The league started in 1959, as five schools broke away from the Eastern Indiana Conference and joined with Wells County Conference member Ossian. This lineup lasted only three years, as Berne would return to the EIC in 1962. The remaining five schools stuck together until 1966, as Geneva high school closed. Lancaster Central, Monmouth, and Ossian were all slated to close that next year, so the remaining four schools went their separate ways. Adams Central (already an Allen County Athletic Conference member) would be joined by Ossian (holding the place for the new Norwell consolidation) in the ACAC, while Lancaster and Monmouth would play out their last season by returning to the EIC.

== Membership ==
School	Location	Mascot	Colors	County	Year joined	Previous conference	Year left	Conference joined
Adams; Central^{1}	Monroe	Flying Jets		01; Adams	1959	Eastern Indiana (EIC)	1966	Allen County
Berne	Berne	Bears		01; Adams	1959	Eastern Indiana (EIC)	1962	Eastern Indiana (EIC)
Geneva	Geneva	Cardinals		01; Adams	1959	Eastern Indiana (EIC)	1966	none (consolidated into South Adams)
Lancaster Central^{2}	Ossian	Knights		90; Wells	1959	Eastern Indiana (EIC)	1966	Eastern Indiana (EIC)
Monmouth	Monmouth	Eagles		01; Adams	1959	Eastern Indiana (EIC)	1966	Eastern Indiana (EIC)
Ossian	Ossian	Bears		90; Wells	1959	Wells County	1966	Allen County

1. Adams Central played in both the EWVC and ACAC for the 1965–66 school year.
2. Lancaster Central played concurrently in the EWVC and WCC for their entire EWVC duration. Both conferences folded in 1966.
