= Westview Junior-Senior High School =

Location
- 1635 South 600 West; Topeka, Lagrange County, Indiana 46571; United States; 41.617009°N 85.539434°W

Information
- Type: Public high school
- School district: Westview School Corporation
- Principal: Timothy Wilson
- Faculty: 45.50 FTE
- Grades: 7–12
- Enrollment: 687 (2023–24)
- Color
- Athletics conference: Northeast Corner
- Team name: Warriors
- Website: www.westview.k12.in.us/o/westview-jr-sr-hs

Westview Jr-Sr High School is a public high school located in Topeka, Indiana, United States, that houses students in grades 7–12.

== About ==
Westview Jr-Sr High School is a small school in the village of Emma in LaGrange County in northeastern Indiana. It is situated in a rural farming community, 50 minutes north of Fort Wayne and 20 minutes east of Goshen. The small towns of Topeka and Shipshewana are located within the district.

Westview School Corporation maintains a unique relationship with the Amish community. Approximately 50 percent of the students in grades K–8 are Amish. Less than one percent of the students in high school are Amish. The main industries in the area are the production of manufactured housing and recreational vehicles, tourism, and farming.

== Athletics ==
The Westview Warriors compete in the Northeast Corner Conference. The school colors are Scarlet Red & Old Gold. The following Indiana High School Athletic Association (IHSAA) sanctioned sports are offered:

- Baseball (boys)
- Basketball (boys and girls)
- Cross country (boys and girls)
- Golf (boys and girls)
- Soccer (boys and girls)
- Softball (girls)
- Tennis (boys and girls)
- Track and field (boys and girls)
- Volleyball (girls)
- Wrestling (boys)

== See also ==
- List of high schools in Indiana
