= Lakelands =

Lakelands may refer to:

- Lakelands, New South Wales
- Lakelands, Western Australia
  - Lakelands railway station
- Lakelands, Maryland
- Lakelands, Nova Scotia (disambiguation), multiple locations
- Lakelands Academy, Ellesmere, Shropshire, England
- Lakelands (film), an Irish drama film

== See also ==
- Lakeland (disambiguation)
