= Chris Heroy =

American stock car racing crew chief (born 1977)

Personal information
- Born: August 10, 1977 (age 48) Angola, Indiana, U.S.

Sport
- Sport: NASCAR Sprint Cup Series
- Team: Richard Petty Motorsports

Chris Heroy is an American stock car racing crew chief. He was formerly the crew chief for the Richard Petty Motorsports No. 44 Ford in the NASCAR Sprint Cup Series with driver Brian Scott. A native of Angola, Indiana, Heroy is a graduate of Angola High School and Colorado College. He became the No. 44 team's crew chief at the start of the 2016 season. Before that he worked on the No. 42 team's crew chief at the start of the 2012 season with then-driver Juan Pablo Montoya, having previously spent eight years at for Hendrick Motorsports as an engineer, after having been a Formula Atlantic series engineer.
