= List of schools in DeKalb County, Indiana =

== DeKalb County Central United School District ==
- Country Meadow Elementary School
- James R. Watson Elementary School
- McKenney-Harrison Elementary School
- Waterloo Elementary School
- DeKalb Middle School
- DeKalb High School

== DeKalb County Eastern Community School District ==
- Butler Elementary School
- Riverdale Elementary School
- Eastside Junior-Senior High School

== Garrett-Keyser-Butler Community School District ==
- J. E. Ober Elementary School
- Garrett Middle School
- Garrett Junior-Senior High School
- St. Joseph Catholic School

== Hamilton Community Schools ==
- Hamilton Elementary School
- Hamilton Junior-Senior High School

== Private schools ==
- Lakewood Park Christian School (Auburn)
- St. Joseph's Catholic School (Garrett)
