= Downtown Butler Historic District =

Historic district in Indiana, United States

- U.S. National Register of Historic Places
- U.S. Historic district
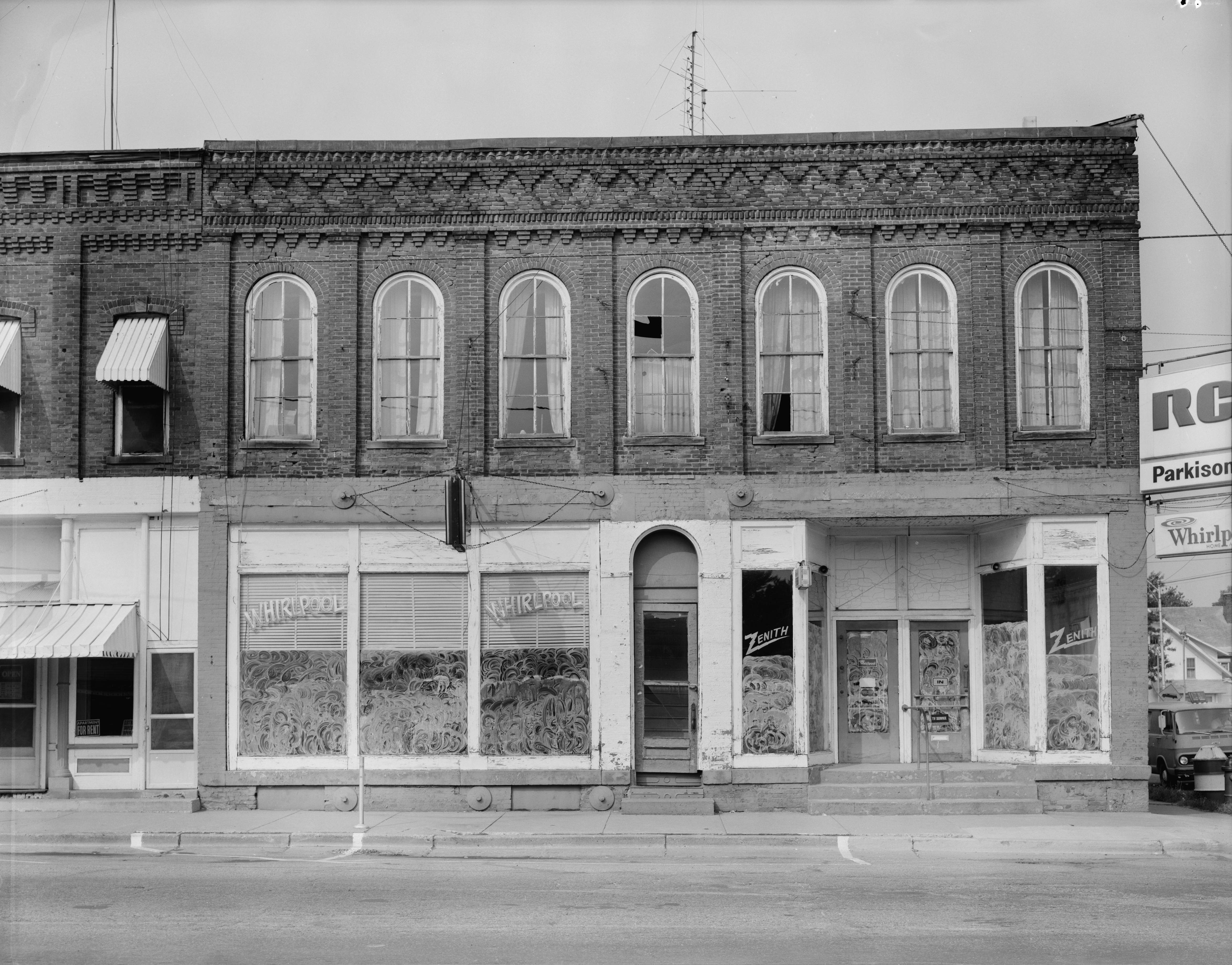
- Butler Masonic Lodge, HABS Photo, 1983

- Location within Indiana Location within the United States
- Location: Roughly 100 & 200 Blocks of South Broadway, Butler, Indiana
- Coordinates: 41°25′45″N 84°52′18″W
- Area: 5.3 acres (2.1 ha)
- Architectural style: Italianate, Early Commercial
- NRHP reference No.: 01001347
- Added to NRHP: December 7, 2001

Downtown Butler Historic District is a national historic district located at Butler, Indiana. The district encompasses 30 contributing buildings in the central business district of Butler. The district developed between about 1860 and 1950, and includes notable examples of Italianate and Early Commercial style architecture. Notable buildings include the Butler Carnegie Library (1916), Marshall Clothing Company, Old Dimestore (1863), First National Bank Building (1913), Butler Hotel (1914), Oberlin Building (1907), Towne Hardware / Broadway Cafe Buildings (1880s), Thompson Block (1903), and Mutzfeld Building (1912).

It was added to the National Register of Historic Places in 2001.
