= West Noble High School =

Location
- 5094 North US 33; Ligonier, Indiana 46767; United States
- 41.425858°N 85.581373°W

Information
- Type: Public high school
- Principal: Gregory Baker
- Faculty: 42.00 (FTE)
- Grades: 9-12
- Enrollment: 724 (2023-24)
- Student to teacher ratio: 17.24
- Color
- Athletics conference: Northeast Corner Conference of Indiana
- Team name: Chargers
- Website: Official Website

West Noble High School is a public high school in Ligonier, Indiana.

The West Noble teams are referred to as the Chargers.

== See also ==
- List of high schools in Indiana
