= Northeast Eight Conference =

Athletic conference in Indiana, United States

- Founded: 1989 (as Northeast Hoosier Conference); 2014 (as Northeast Eight Conference)
- Folded: 2015
- No. of teams: 8; 6 Class 4A, 2 Class 3A
- Region: 7 Indiana counties (Adams, Allen, DeKalb, Huntington, Noble, Wells, and Whitley)

Locations
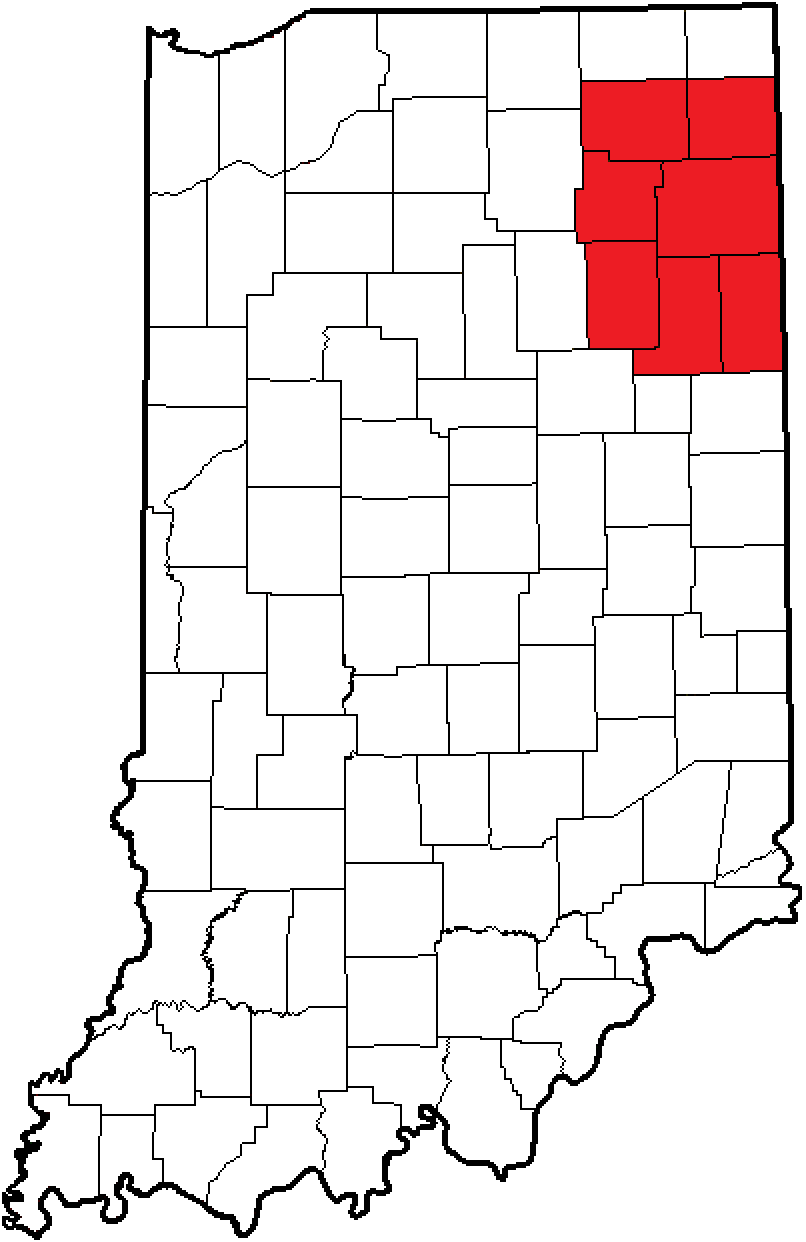

The Northeast Eight Conference was an eight-member IHSAA-sanctioned athletic conference within the northeastern Indiana counties of Adams, Allen, DeKalb, Huntington, Noble, Wells, and Whitley. The conference was started in 1989 as the Northeast Hoosier Conference, when six schools from the Northeastern Indiana Athletic Conference (Bellmont, Columbia City, DeKalb, East Noble, Homestead, and New Haven) joined with two schools from the Allen County Athletic Conference (Fort Wayne Carroll and Norwell).

When the smaller six schools decided to pull out of the conference in 2015, the conference essentially ceased to exist, forcing the much larger Carroll and Homestead into joining the Summit Athletic Conference. The remaining schools, while settling on the current league name, added Huntington North of the North Central Conference and Leo of the Allen County Athletic Conference, who are more similar in size to the rest of the schools. While the six NEHC schools technically dropped out, they never actually left the league, having succeeded in forcing out the two large Fort Wayne schools, ended up staying in the league. This is not an unheard of tactic, as most notably Ohio's Chagrin Valley Conference pulled virtually the same move around the same time.

== Membership ==
School	Location	Mascot	Colors	Enrollment 25–26	IHSAA Class/Football Class	# / County	Year joined	Previous conference
Bellmont	Decatur	Braves		607	3A/3A	01; Adams	1989	Northeastern Indiana
Columbia; City	Columbia City	Eagles		1,180	3A/4A	92; Whitley	1989	Northeastern Indiana
DeKalb	Waterloo	Barons		932	3A/4A	17; DeKalb	1989	Northeastern Indiana
East; Noble	Kendallville	Knights		999	3A/4A	57; Noble	1989	Northeastern Indiana
Huntington; North	Huntington	Vikings		1,441	4A/5A	35; Huntington	2015	North Central
Leo	Leo	Lions		886	3A/4A	02; Allen	2015	Allen County
New Haven	New Haven	Bulldogs		1,119	3A/4A	02; Allen	1989	Northeastern Indiana
Norwell	Ossian	Knights		754	3A/3A	90; Wells	1989	Allen County

=== Former members (As Northeast Hoosier Conference) ===
School	Location	Mascot	Colors	Enrollment	IHSAA Class	# / County	Year joined	Previous conference	Year left	Conference joined
Fort Wayne; Carroll	Fort Wayne	Chargers		2,472	AAAA	02; Allen	1989	Allen County	2015	Summit
Fort Wayne; Homestead	Fort Wayne	Spartans		2,502	AAAA	02; Allen	1989	Northeastern Indiana	2015	Summit

== State championships ==
=== Bellmont (9) ===
- 1987 Wrestling
- 1988 Wrestling
- 1994 Wrestling
- 2007 Volleyball (3A)
- 2008 Football (3A)
- 2010 Volleyball (3A)
- 2016 Wrestling (2A)
- 2020 Wrestling (2A)
- 2026 Girls Basketball (3A)

=== DeKalb (4) ===
- 1980 Baseball
- 1986 Football (4A)
- 2021 Unified Flag Football
- 2025 Unified Flag Football

=== East Noble (1) ===
- 2000 Football (4A)

=== Leo (6) ===
- 2014 Softball (3A)
- 2012 Hockey (3A)
- 2014 Hockey (4A)
- 2016 Hockey (3A)
- 2018 Rugby (D-1)
- 2019 Rugby (D-1)

=== Carroll (2) ===
- 2010 Baseball (4A)
- 2011 Baseball (4A)

=== Homestead (10) ===
- 1983 Gymnastics
- 1984 Gymnastics
- 1985 Gymnastics
- 1990 Hockey (2A)
- 1991 Hockey (A)
- 1995 Hockey (2A)
- 1996 Gymnastics
- 1999 Gymnastics
- 2001 Gymnastics
- 2015 Boys Basketball (4A)

=== Huntington North (2) ===
- 1990 Girls Basketball
- 1995 Girls Basketball

=== Norwell (4) ===
- 2003 Baseball (3A)
- 2007 Baseball (3A)
- 2013 Baseball (3A)
- 2025 Girls Basketball (3A)

== Resources ==
- Northeast Hoosier Conference Football
- IHSAA Conferences
- IHSAA Directory
- IHSAA State Chamionship History
