= Verdi Karns =

American composer

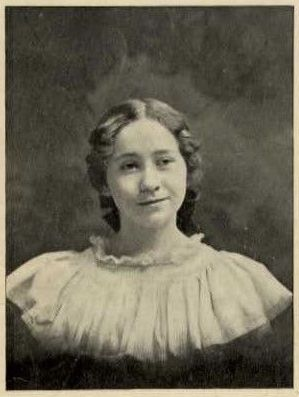
- Verdi Karns, from an 1899 publication.
- Born: April 30, 1882; Bluffton, Indiana
- Died: April 5, 1925 (aged 42); Phoenix, Arizona
- Other names: Verdi Karns Sturgis
- Occupation: composer

Verdi Karns (April 30, 1882 – April 5, 1925), after 1908 Verdi Karns Sturgis, was an American composer of popular tunes.

== Early life ==
Verdi Karns was born in Bluffton, Indiana, the daughter of Lewis Henry Karns and Olive Covert Karns. She was named for the composer Giuseppe Verdi. Her father was a marble cutter. Her mother died in 1884, when Verdi Karns was a small child. She was raised by an aunt and uncle after her father remarried and moved to Kansas.

Karns graduated from Bluffton High School in 1901. She attended a music conservatory in Indianapolis; she played piano and violin.

== Career ==
Karns began publishing her own compositions while she was still in high school. Works by Karns included "Giuseppe March" (1898), "Kentucky Rag" (1898), "Bluffton Carnival Rag" (1899), "Ragamuffin" (1899), "Blufftonian Waltzes" (1900), and "Yo' Got to Hab a License or Yo' Can't Get In" (1905, lyrics by Laverne Brown).

== Personal life ==
Verdi Karns married her neighbor, lawyer Raymond R. Sturgis, in 1908. They had a daughter Olive Diana Sturgis, born in 1912. The couple moved to the American Southwest for health reasons, settling in Albuquerque, New Mexico, and then in Phoenix, Arizona. Verdi Karns Sturgis died in Phoenix in 1925, aged 42 years, from tuberculosis.

Pianist Nora Hulse has included performances of Verdi Karns's music on several of her CDs, including Cake Walks, Two Steps and Rags by Women Composers (1999), Ragtime Refreshments (2002), and 60 Years of Ragtime Piano.
