= Fremont High School (Indiana) =

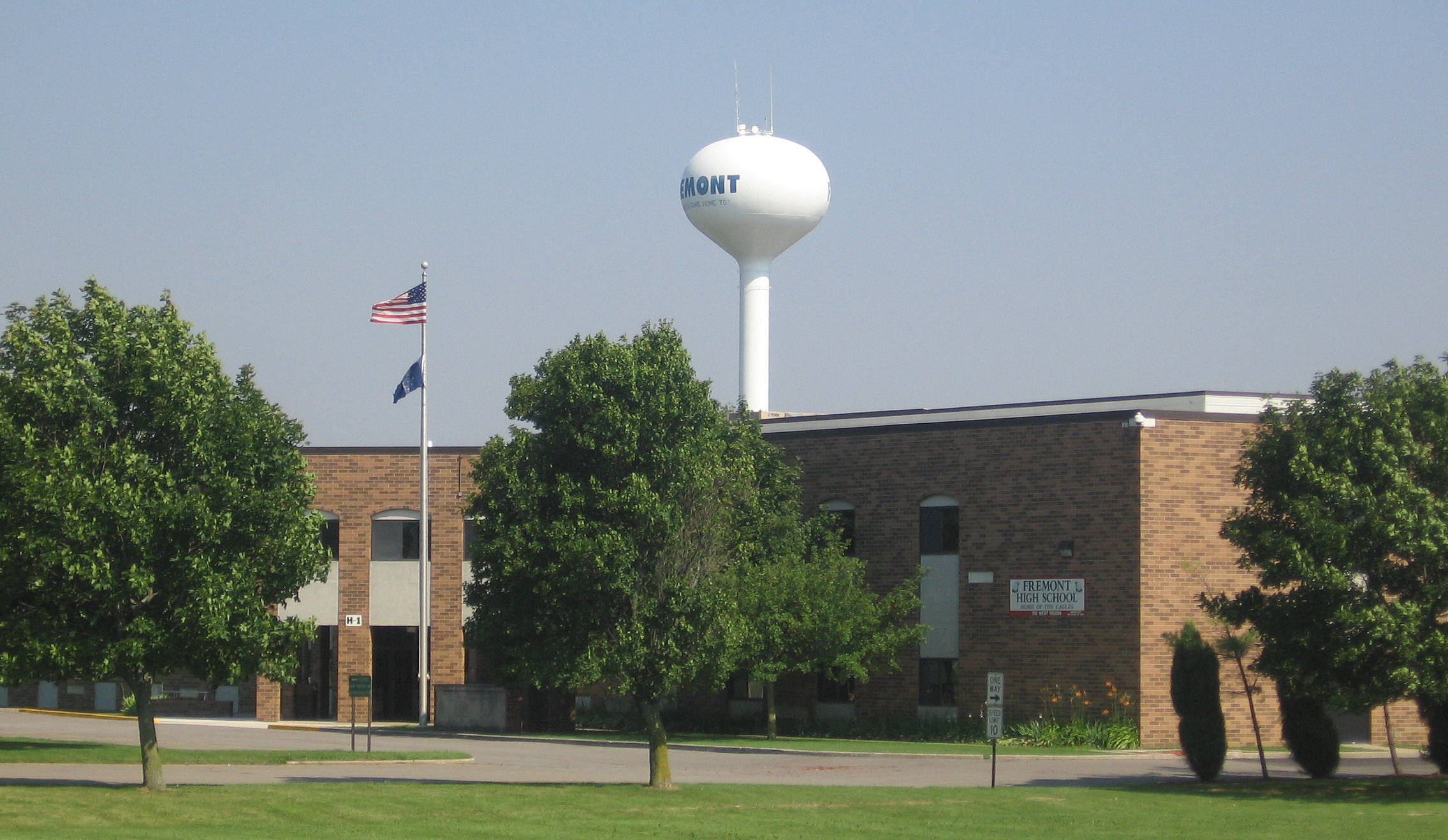
- Fremont High School

Location
- 701 West Toledo; Fremont, Indiana 46737; United States
- 41°43′47″N 84°56′24″W

Information
- Type: Public high school
- Motto: Where Excellence Soars
- School district: Fremont Community Schools Independent School District
- Superintendent: William Stitt
- Principal: Mark Sherbondy
- Teaching staff: 19.33 (FTE)
- Grades: 9-12
- Enrollment: 283 (2023-2024)
- Student to teacher ratio: 14.64
- Color
- Athletics conference: Northeast Corner Conference of Indiana (NECC)
- Nickname: Eagles
- Rival: Angola High School
- Website: www.fcs.k12.in.us/o/fhs

Fremont High School is a public high school located in Fremont, Indiana, United States. Fremont High School is the high school for the Fremont Community Schools Independent School District

== Academics ==
Fremont High School currently uses block scheduling, meaning students have four 85 minute classes per day. The school year is divided into 4 quarters, much like American universities. Courses offered meet all of the requirements for Academic Honors Diploma, Technical Honors Diploma, and Core 40 Diploma. The school is able to keep its graduation rate high through Steuben County's Educational Opportunity Center (EOC), an alternative high school, which "meets the needs of discouraged and defeated students" and allows students to graduate with diplomas from their original school district. Fremont HS students are 70% proficient in English and 73% in algebra, generating a college readiness score of 17.5.

In the fall of 2009, Fremont High School entered into an agreement with Trine University to offer 12 different dual credit concurrent enrollment courses on the high school campus along with Advanced Placement Biology.

- Microeconomics
- Principles of Sociology
- Introduction to Government
- Psychology
- American History II
- English Composition I
- Introduction to Literature
- English Composition II
- College Algebra
- Pre-calculus
- Calculus I
- Advanced Computer Applications

In 2010, approximately 40 students earned at least 3 dual credits or scored a 3 or above on an AP exam. These 40 students took nearly 100 dual credit or AP courses for a potential total of 300 semester hours. In 2011, only 12.2% of the 22 students sitting for AP exams passed.

Schools in Indiana are assessed by their ISTEP+ scores. In 2010–2011, 97.8% of Fremont High School students passed the mathematics assessment. Meanwhile, 90% of students passed the English/language arts assessment. Fremont High School scores above the state average for students achieving College and Career Readiness (ccr)at 67.8%. In general, academics are secondary to athletics at high schools in this area of Indiana.

Fremont High School graduates, who pursue collegiate studies, primarily attend schools in Indiana, such as Huntington University (United States), Bethel College (Indiana), IUPUI, and IPFW. A number of current Fremont High School teachers are also Fremont graduates.

== Performing Arts ==
Fremont High School has a music program consisting of a concert band, jazz band, concert chorus, and show chorus.

== Athletics ==
FHS teams compete in the Northeast Corner Conference of Indiana (NECC) against Angola, Central Noble, Churubusco, Eastside, Fairfield, Hamilton, Lakeland, Prairie Heights, West Noble, and Westview. Fremont High School has teams for

- boys' & girls' golf
- boys' baseball
- boys' & girls' tennis
- boys' & girls' basketball
- boys' football
- boys' & girls' cross-country and track
- boys' wrestling
- girls' volleyball
- girls' softball

== Facilities ==
The current Fremont High School building (adjacent to the elementary school) was opened in the fall of 1980. Fremont High School consists of one building attached to Fremont Elementary School by a hallway. The elementary and high schools share a cafeteria. The high school is two levels with a small elevator for physically disabled students' use. It consists of an upper and lower hallway wrapped around the gymnasium. There is one auditorium, eight restrooms, an auto repair shop, an industrial tech facility, a weight-lifting room, two music rooms, and 20 classrooms. A new Max Mitchell Athletic Complex building which includes an auxiliary gymnasium and related facilities was completed in the fall of 2006.

== See also ==
- List of high schools in Indiana
