= WCYT =

WCYT-FM
- Lafayette Township, Indiana; United States
- Broadcast area: Ft. Wayne area
- Frequency: 91.1 MHz
- Branding: The Point 91FM

Programming
- Format: Indie

Ownership
- Owner: Southwest Allen County Schools

History
- Former call signs: WJTJ (1993–1993)

Technical information
- Licensing authority: FCC
- Facility ID: 61430
- Class: A
- ERP: 125 watts
- HAAT: 69.0 meters
- Transmitter coordinates: 40°58′51.00″N 85°16′48.00″W

Links
- Public license information: Public file; LMS
- Webcast: Listen Live
- Website: wcyt.org

WCYT (91.1 FM) is a Non-profit educational radio station broadcasting an Indie format. Licensed to Lafayette Township, Indiana, United States, the station serves the Fort Wayne area. The station is currently owned by Southwest Allen County Schools. Studios are located at Homestead Senior High School. Students enrolled in broadcasting classes during the school day are in charge of running the station during school hours. Students can also host after-school radio shows as well as call Homestead High School Athletic events for those interested in learning about sports broadcasting.

== History ==
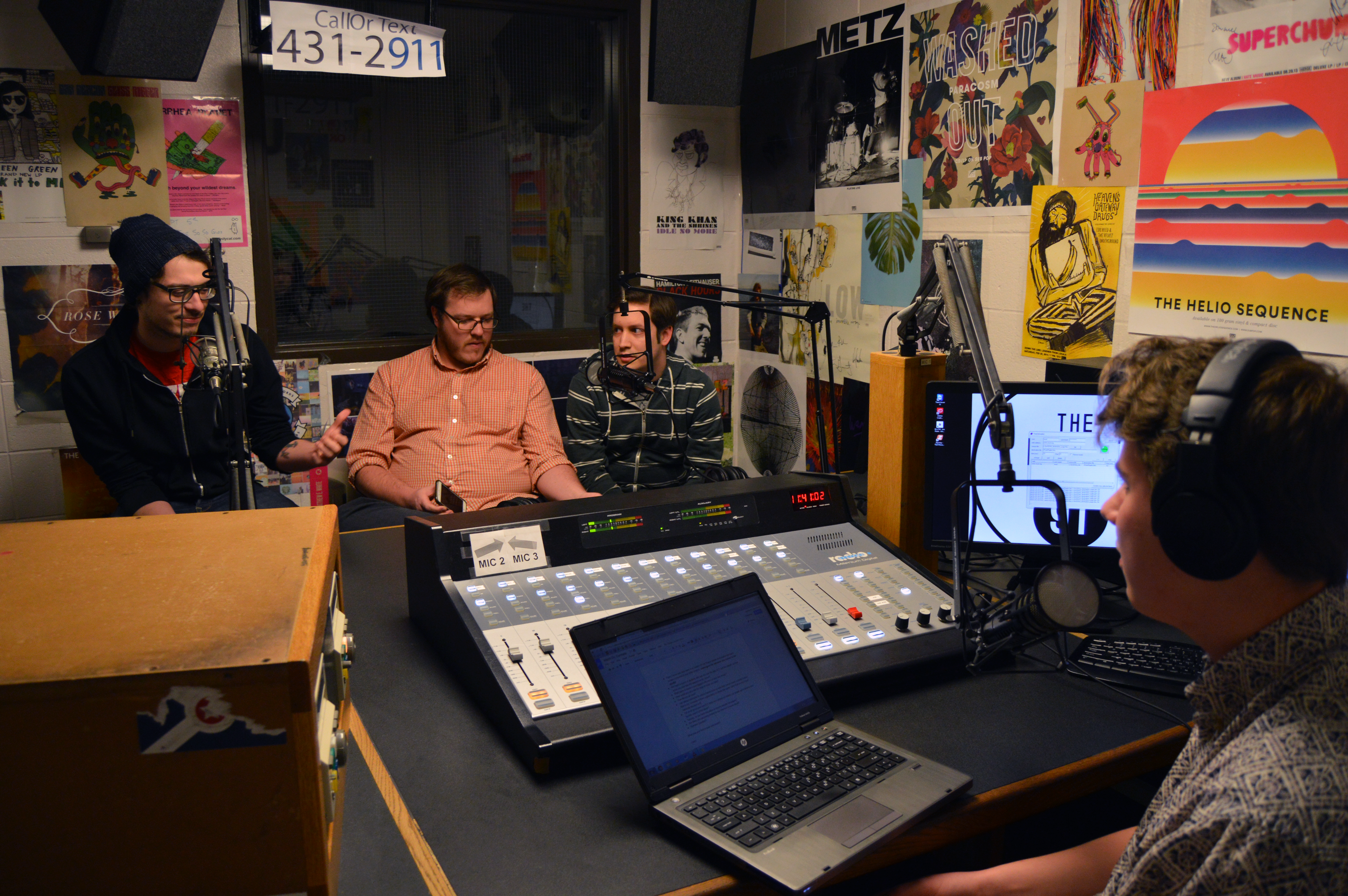
March on, Comrade in Studio

Founded in 1995 under the name Y91. In the 1995–1996 school year it went on the air. It quickly became the first high school radio station with a website. The student-designed website can be found at www.wcyt.org. In 1998 the name was changed to "The Point" with the motto "What Music Sounds Like."

In 1999, and again in 2001, the station broadcast live from The Rock and Roll Hall of Fame in Cleveland, Ohio. The station switched to a 24-hour format on February 2, 2002.

For a period of two years the station would have the motto "Tomorrow's Hits Today," before switching to "Fort Wayne's Only Alternative." The motto changed again in the summer of 2011, when the format changed to Indie/Alternative, to "Where Music is the Point." Along with playing music and deejaying, the students also broadcast school sporting events live on the air. The student broadcasters have garnered moderate attention with columns written about them in local newspapers and magazines as well as video reports on local news television stations.

== Format ==
The station is currently the only indie station in Fort Wayne. The main source of growing popularity is the fact that "the Point" is a non-commercial radio station and offers 59 minutes of music every hour. WCYT has made it a priority to support the Fort Wayne music scene by debuting songs from bands like Metavari, The Orange Opera, James and the Drifters, and Heaven's Gateway Drugs.
