= Hamilton Community High School =

Location
- 903 South Wayne Street; Hamilton, Dekalb County, Indiana 46742; United States
- Coordinates: 41.523441°N 84.918071°W

Information
- Type: Public high school
- School district: Hamilton Community Schools
- Principal: Chris Gerbers
- Staff: 19.50 (FTE)
- Grades: 7-12
- Enrollment: 168 (2023-2024)
- Student to teacher ratio: 8.62
- Color
- Athletics conference: Northeast Corner Conference of Indiana
- Team name: Marines
- Website: Official Website

Hamilton Community High School is a public high school located in Hamilton, Indiana.

== Athletics ==
Hamilton Community High School's athletic teams are the Marines and they compete in the Northeast Corner Conference of Indiana. The school offers a limited range of athletics including:

- Baseball
- Basketball (boys and girls)
- Golf
- Soccer
- Track and field
- Volleyball

=== Basketball ===
The 2015–2016 boys basketball team went 4–18 overall and lost to Bethany Christian High School in the first round of the 2015–16 IHSAA Class 1A Boys Basketball State Tournament.

== See also ==
- List of high schools in Indiana
