= Lakeland Elementary School =

Lakeland Elementary School may refer to several schools in the United States:

- Lakeland Elementary School of Lakeland, Tennessee
- Lakeland Elementary School of Humble, Texas
- Lakeland Elementary School of Lewisville, Texas
- Lakeland Elementary School of Auburn, Washington
