= Carroll High School (Fort Wayne, Indiana) =

Location
- 3701 Carroll Road; Fort Wayne, Indiana 46818; United States; 41°11′25″N 85°11′33″W

Information
- Established: 1969; 57 years ago
- Locale: Suburban
- School district: Northwest Allen County Schools
- Superintendent: Wayne Barker
- Principal: Cleve Million
- Teaching staff: 145.18 (FTE)
- Grades: 9–12
- Enrollment: 2,623 (2024–2025)
- Student to teacher ratio: 18.07
- Color
- Nickname: Chargers
- Newspaper: The Charger Online
- Website: ch.nacs.k12.in.us

Carroll High School is a school in Fort Wayne, Indiana, United States. It is part of the Northwest Allen County Schools and is accredited by the North Central Association.

== History ==
=== Indiana school reorganization ===
The Indiana General Assembly passed the Indiana School Reorganization Act of 1959, which required school districts with fewer than 2,000 students to consolidate with nearby districts. This resulted in the three Allen County townships of Lake, Eel River and Perry combining into Northwest Allen County Schools (NACS). At that time, high schools existed in Arcola and Huntertown. The NACS school board voted to combine the two high schools in 1967 into a single newly built school south of Huntertown. The new high school, which opened in 1969, was named after Carroll Road, a rural arterial road that connects U.S. Route 33 and State Road 3 in northern Allen County.

=== Farmland to suburban boom ===
Booming enrollment from the suburban sprawl of nearby Fort Wayne into Perry Township caused NACS to build Carroll Middle School (CMS) adjacent to the main high school in 1984. By the fall of 2004 as enrollment continued to increase, the school district built other middle schools (including a new Carroll Middle School), and the old CMS was absorbed into Carroll High School as its "freshman campus." In 2023, the school began another expansion with 27 new classroom and support spaces including 2 Applied Skills Rooms, Science and Digital Design Rooms, 8 General Education Rooms, a Credit Recovery Room, an upgraded Weight Room with a 50% capacity increase, a cafeteria expansion and a new media center with a student cafe and study rooms. The total project included 70,000 sq.ft. of new additions and 25,000 sq.ft. of renovated space.

=== Academics ===
Carroll High School consistently ranks among the top public high schools in Indiana for overall academic performance and standardized testing and is known for expanding STEM, engineering, and computer science offerings alongside extensive Advanced Placement (AP) and dual-credit courses.

=== Performing Arts & Clubs ===
Show Choir & Band: Carroll is widely recognized for its fine arts department, particularly its award-winning Marching Band and competitive Show Choirs (Minstrel Magic and Select Sound) and offers active chapters in robotics, DECA, speech and debate, and unified sports in track and flag football. In 2025, the Unfied Flag Football team claimed the State Championship

=== Play cancellation controversy ===
In February 2023, Carroll High School administrators approved the teen version of a play titled Marian, Or The True Tale of Robin Hood for Carroll High School's spring play performance. The play, written by playwright Adam Szymkowicz and published in 2017, features a nonbinary character and a gay couple.

On February 24, after two days of auditions, Carroll High School principal Cleve Million canceled the production of the play.

An online petition on Change.org asking for the cancelation to be reversed was started by an anonymous user after the play's cancellation. The petition originally aimed for 250 signatures but ultimately received 5,613 signatures.

Reasons for the play being canceled vary. The petition alleges that the play was canceled because “some adults and parents within the NACS community caught wind of the play's contents and began calling the administration in protest, some using threatening tones.” The petition also claims that the play was canceled due to "safety concerns for the students involved.”

However, Northwest Allen County Schools superintendent Wayne Barker said in a statement to Playbill.com that “The decisions to approve the play and to cancel the play were made by the high school principal without any prior knowledge by me or the Board of School Trustees. Simply, the principal was concerned about the disruption that was being caused between students who wanted to participate in the play. Rumors persist that the play was canceled because of parental complaints or threats made against students by outside people. This is simply not true. I did not receive one call about this play before Mr. Million called to tell me of his decision to cancel it. I will just reiterate that Mr. Million did what he felt was best for our students. He didn’t do this because of threats from others or the storyline of the play. He was concerned about how our students who wanted to participate in the play were treating each other. This is why I supported his decision.” Barker also stated that no “parental complaints or threats” were made against students.

On February 27, at a Northwest Allen County Schools' board meeting, several community members spoke against the play's cancellation. However, Barker and the Northwest Allen County School Board upheld the decision to cancel the play.

The play was put on independently in partnership with Fort Wayne Pride Inc. after raising almost $85,000 from a GoFundMe campaign that originally asked for $50,000. The play was performed at the Foellinger Theater on May 20 to a sold-out crowd of 1,500 people.

== General information ==
The school opened in 1969 and constructed additions to the facility in 1992 and 1996. A freshman campus was created in 2005.

== Athletics ==
The Carroll High School Chargers compete in the Summit Athletic Conference (SAC). Carroll was previously a member of the Northeast Eight Conference, but joined the SAC in 2015. Carroll's biggest rival is with the crosstown Spartans of Homestead High School. The following Indiana High School Athletic Association (IHSAA) sports are offered:

- Baseball (boys)
  - State champion - 2010, 2011
- Basketball (girls and boys)
- Cross country (girls and boys)
  - Boys state champion - 2016
  - Girls state champion - 2018, 2019
- Football (boys)
- Golf (girls and boys)
- Gymnastics (girls)
- Soccer (girls and boys)
- Softball (girls)
- Swimming and diving (girls and boys)
- Tennis (girls and boys)
- Track and field Girls and boys)
- Unified flag football (coed)
- Unified track and field (coed)
- Volleyball (girls and boys)
- Wrestling (boys)

== Notable alumni ==
- Zach Avery, Ponzi schemer
- Justin Busch, Indiana State Senator, 16th District
- Jon Fitch, professional mixed martial artist, formerly with the UFC
- Collin Schiffli, filmmaker
- Drue Tranquill, NFL linebacker, Kansas City Chiefs

== See also ==
- List of high schools in Indiana
