= Lakeland Junior/Senior High School (Indiana) =

Lakeland Jr/Sr High School

Location
- 805 East 075 North; LaGrange, Indiana 46761; United States; 41.654016°N 85.410112°W

Information
- Type: Public high school
- School district: Lakeland School Corporation
- Superintendent: Dr. Traci A. Blaize
- Principal: Jason Schackow
- Teaching staff: 63.00 (on an FTE basis)
- Grades: 7–12
- Enrollment: 764 (2023-2024)
- Student to teacher ratio: 12.13
- Colors: Columbia blue, red and white
- Athletics conference: Northeast Corner
- Nickname: Lakers
- Rivals: Prairie Heights Senior High School, and Westview High School, and Angola high school
- Newspaper: Laker Weekly Newsletter
- Website: www.lakelandlakers.org/lakeland-jr-sr-high-school-home

Lakeland Jr/Sr High School (formerly Lakeland High School) is a public high school located in LaGrange, Indiana, United States. It is the only secondary school in the Lakeland School Corporation. LHS students are given the opportunity to complete a variety of dual credit and Advanced Placement classes in a variety of subjects in addition to completing their regular requirements for a high school diploma. Current and past partners for dual credit and AP are IPFW, IUPUI, Ivy Tech Community College, Trine University, and the University of Saint Francis (Indiana). As of the 2019–20 school year, the school serves grades 7–12.

== Demographics ==
The demographic breakdown of the 578 students enrolled in 2016–17 was:

=== By race ===
- Native American/Alaskan - 0.2%
- Asian - 0.9%
- Black - 1.6%
- Hispanic - 19.2%
- White - 75.3%
- Multiracial - 2.8%

45.5% of the students were eligible for free or reduced-cost lunch. For 2016–17, Lakeland was a Title I school.

The demographic breakdown of the 855 students enrolled in 2020–21 was:

=== By gender ===
- Male - 50%
- Female - 49%
- Other 1%

=== By race ===
- American Indian/Alaska Native - 0.5%
- Asian - 0.6%
- Black - 0.5%
- Hispanic - 22.0%
- White - 72.8%
- Multiracial - 3.6%

=== By grade ===
- 7th grade - 238
- 8th grade - 156
- 9th grade - 174
- 10th grade - 146
- 11th grade - 129
- 12th grade - 258
- Ungraded - 4

For 2020–21, Lakeland was a Title I school.

== Athletics ==
The Lakeland Lakers compete in the Northeast Corner Conference. The school colors are Columbia blue, red and white. The following Indiana High School Athletic Association (IHSAA) sanctioned sports are offered:

- Baseball (boys)
- Basketball (girls and boys)
- Cross country (boys and girls)
- Football (boys)
- Golf (girls and boys)
- Soccer (girls and boys)
- Softball (girls)
- Tennis (girls and boys)
- Track and field (girls and boys)
- Volleyball (girls)
- Wrestling (girls and boys)
- E-Sports (girls and boys)

== Recent Corporation History ==
In 2019 LSC announced that it would close Wolcott Mills and Lima-Brighton Elementary Schools. Starting in the 20–21 school year, all students would go to three restructured schools:

- Lakeland Primary (K–2)
- Lakeland Intermediate (3–6)
- Lakeland Jr/Sr High (7–12)

The Wolcott Mills and Lima-Brighton buildings were repurposed for preschool and community use.

== See also ==
- List of high schools in Indiana
- LaGrange, Indiana
