= Lakeland Christian Academy (Alberta) =

Location
- 1402 10 Street; Cold Lake, Alberta; Canada; 54.45896°N 110.172979°W

Lakeland Christian Academy is a private school in Cold Lake, Alberta, Canada. It is affiliated with Harvest Life Victory Church.
