= Bluffton High School (Indiana) =

Location
- 1 Tiger Trail; Bluffton, Indiana 46714; United States; 40°43′25″N 85°09′45″W

Information
- Type: Public high school
- Motto: Excellence is Expected Here
- Established: 1883
- Locale: Suburban
- School district: Bluffton-Harrison Metropolitan School District
- Principal: Stacy Morrison
- Teaching staff: 38.50 (FTE)
- Grades: 9-12
- Enrollment: 507 (2023-2024)
- Student to teacher ratio: 13.17
- Color
- Athletics: Basketball, Football, Cross-Country, Track and Field, Swimming, Volleyball, Baseball, Softball, Wrestling
- Athletics conference: Allen County Athletic Conference
- Team name: Tigers
- Website: Official website

Bluffton High School is a public high school located in Bluffton, Indiana, United States.

== Curriculum ==
=== Classes ===
Bluffton uses four class periods of one hour and twenty-five minutes each, as opposed to the seven-period system used at other schools. Bluffton offers various honors, AP, and dual-credit classes in social studies, science, mathematics, and English. Dual-credit engineering and vocational classes are also offered.

=== Diplomas ===
Along with most Indiana high schools, Bluffton has adopted a credit system called Core 40, requiring 40 credits — four years of English, three years of math, social studies, and science, and ten to twelve elective credits, plus two semesters of physical education, and a credit in health education. Bluffton also offers a slightly more rigorous Academic Honors Diploma, which requires 47 credits, and a basic one which requires 40 credits like Core 40, but lowers the bar in the Core 40 six-credit subjects to just four credits.

== Notable alumni ==
- D'Wayne Eskridge - Professional football player for the Miami Dolphins
- Adam Ballinger - National Basketball Association (Australia) / NCAA
- Verdi Karns, ragtime composer, class of 1901
- Everett Scott - Major League Baseball

== Staff ==
- Steve Baker - Served as principal from the 1990s to 2025, taught math for several years before that
- Stacy Morrison - Current principal, Served as vice-principal, and coach girls volleyball

== See also ==
- List of high schools in Indiana
