= Topeka, Indiana =

- Town
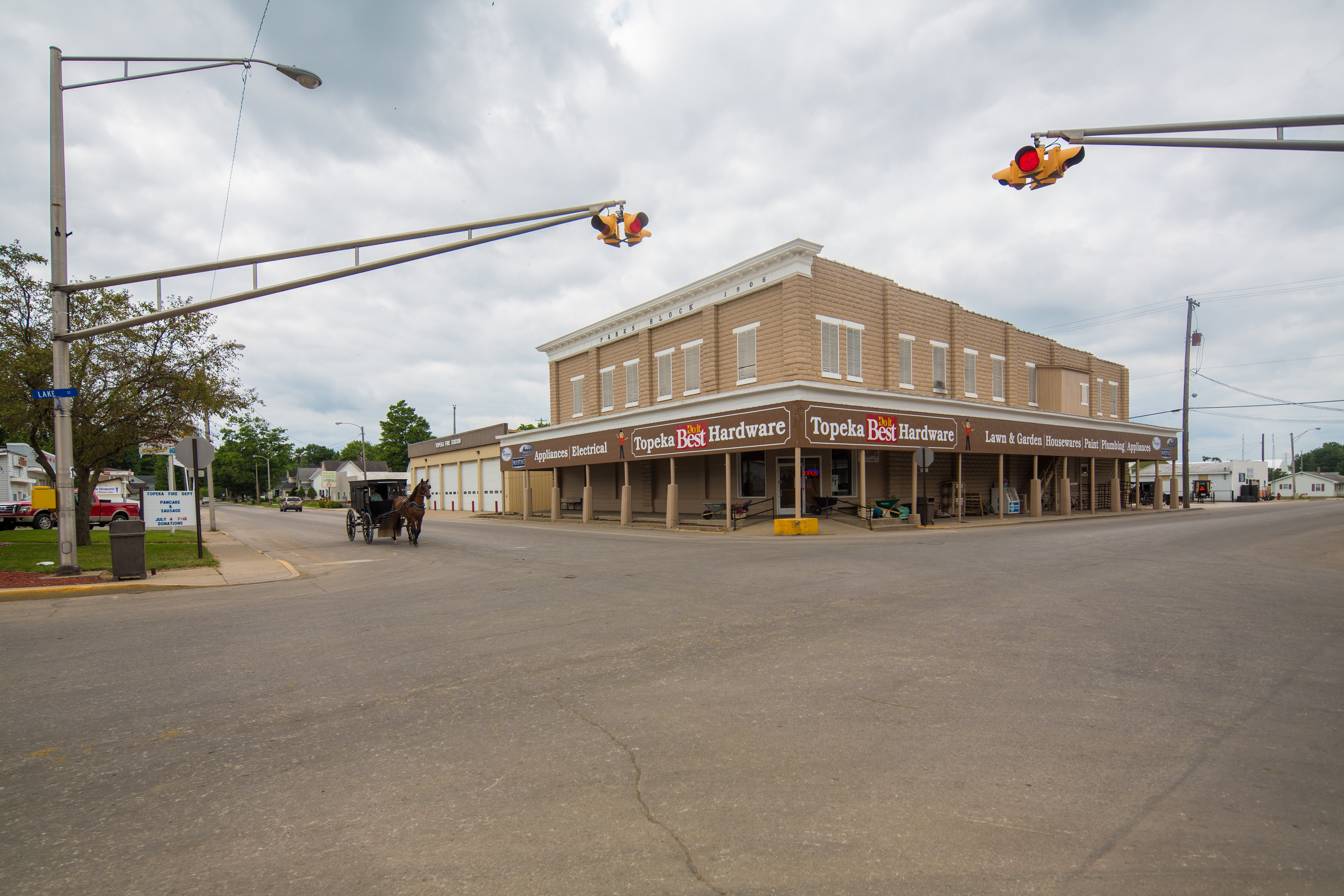

- Logo

- Location of Topeka in LaGrange County, Indiana.
- Coordinates: 41°32′22″N 85°32′51″W
- Country: United States
- State: Indiana
- County: LaGrange
- Township: Clearspring, Eden

Area
  - Total: 1.61 sq mi (4.18 km^{2})
  - Land: 1.61 sq mi (4.18 km^{2})
  - Water: 0 sq mi (0.00 km^{2})
- Elevation: 929 ft (283 m)

Population (2020)
  - Total: 1,206
  - Density: 747.4/sq mi (288.56/km^{2})
- Time zone: UTC-5 (Eastern (EST))
  - Summer (DST): UTC-4 (EDT)
- ZIP code: 46571
- Area code: 260
- FIPS code: 18-76184
- GNIS feature ID: 2397697
- Website: topeka-in.gov

Topeka is a town in Clearspring and Eden townships, LaGrange County, Indiana, United States. As of the 2020 census, Topeka had a population of 1,206. Topeka is located approximately eleven miles south of Shipshewana, Indiana.

Topeka was likely so named because the landscape reminded settlers of Topeka, Kansas.

== Geography ==
According to the 2010 census, Topeka has a total area of 1.74 square miles (4.51 km^{2}), all land.

== Demographics ==
Historical population
Census	Pop.	Note	%±
1920	512		—
1930	489		−4.5%
1940	496		1.4%
1950	557		12.3%
1960	600		7.7%
1970	677		12.8%
1980	876		29.4%
1990	912		4.1%
2000	1,159		27.1%
2010	1,153		−0.5%
2020	1,206		4.6%
U.S. Decennial Census

=== 2020 census ===
As of the 2020 census, Topeka had a population of 1,206. The median age was 30.6 years. 33.1% of residents were under the age of 18 and 11.0% of residents were 65 years of age or older. For every 100 females there were 93.6 males, and for every 100 females age 18 and over there were 93.5 males age 18 and over.

0.0% of residents lived in urban areas, while 100.0% lived in rural areas.

There were 417 households in Topeka, of which 37.9% had children under the age of 18 living in them. Of all households, 49.9% were married-couple households, 19.2% were households with a male householder and no spouse or partner present, and 23.5% were households with a female householder and no spouse or partner present. About 27.8% of all households were made up of individuals and 10.6% had someone living alone who was 65 years of age or older.

There were 448 housing units, of which 6.9% were vacant. The homeowner vacancy rate was 2.9% and the rental vacancy rate was 3.6%.

Racial composition as of the 2020 census
Race	Number	Percent
White	1,128	93.5%
Black or African American	4	0.3%
American Indian and Alaska Native	0	0.0%
Asian	16	1.3%
Native Hawaiian and Other Pacific Islander	0	0.0%
Some other race	11	0.9%
Two or more races	47	3.9%
Hispanic or Latino (of any race)	49	4.1%

=== 2010 census ===
As of the census of 2010, there were 1,153 people, 421 households, and 291 families living in the town. The population density was 662.6 inhabitants per square mile (255.8/km^{2}). There were 456 housing units at an average density of 262.1 per square mile (101.2/km^{2}). The racial makeup of the town was 94.4% White, 0.3% African American, 1.0% Asian, 1.6% from other races, and 2.7% from two or more races. Hispanic or Latino of any race were 3.6% of the population.

There were 421 households, of which 43.9% had children under the age of 18 living with them, 50.6% were married couples living together, 12.8% had a female householder with no husband present, 5.7% had a male householder with no wife present, and 30.9% were non-families. 26.8% of all households were made up of individuals, and 10.2% had someone living alone who was 65 years of age or older. The average household size was 2.74 and the average family size was 3.34.

The median age in the town was 29.6 years. 33.9% of residents were under the age of 18; 8.7% were between the ages of 18 and 24; 28.2% were from 25 to 44; 21% were from 45 to 64; and 8.2% were 65 years of age or older. The gender makeup of the town was 47.8% male and 52.2% female.

=== 2000 census ===
As of the census of 2000, there were 1,159 people, 448 households, and 310 families living in the town. The population density was 841.2 inhabitants per square mile (324.8/km^{2}). There were 482 housing units at an average density of 349.8 per square mile (135.1/km^{2}). The racial makeup of the town was 95.34% White, 0.69% Asian, 1.38% from other races, and 2.59% from two or more races. Hispanic or Latino of any race were 2.67% of the population.

There were 448 households, out of which 37.7% had children under the age of 18 living with them, 49.8% were married couples living together, 12.9% had a female householder with no husband present, and 30.6% were non-families. 26.6% of all households were made up of individuals, and 8.3% had someone living alone who was 65 years of age or older. The average household size was 2.59 and the average family size was 3.10.

In the town, the population was spread out, with 31.1% under the age of 18, 11.4% from 18 to 24, 30.5% from 25 to 44, 17.1% from 45 to 64, and 9.9% who were 65 years of age or older. The median age was 29 years. For every 100 females, there were 95.8 males. For every 100 females age 18 and over, there were 95.1 males.

The median income for a household in the town was $37,105, and the median income for a family was $42,232. Males had a median income of $32,356 versus $23,542 for females. The per capita income for the town was $17,269. About 7.3% of families and 9.1% of the population were below the poverty line, including 11.7% of those under age 18 and 10.1% of those age 65 or over.

== Arts and culture ==
Topeka has a public library, a branch of the La Grange County Public Library.
