= Angola High School =

Location
- 350 South John Mcbride Avenue; Angola, Indiana 46703; United States
- Coordinates: 41.6319°N 84.9719°W

Information
- Type: Public high school
- Motto: Empowering our students with 21st Century Literacy Skills
- School district: Metropolitan School District of Steuben County
- Principal: Travis Heavin
- Faculty: 50.00 (FTE)
- Grades: 9–12
- Enrollment: 741 (2023-24)
- Student to teacher ratio: 14.82
- Color
- Athletics conference: Northeast Corner Conference of Indiana
- Team name: Hornets
- Website: ahs.msdsteuben.k12.in.us

Angola High School is a public high school named for the town it serves in Angola, Steuben County, Indiana. Angola High School is in the lake region of northeast Indiana and serves students from rural and small town areas. Five percent of the student body population are minorities. Twenty-three percent of students receive free or reduced lunches.

Angola High School is a part of the Metropolitan School District of Steuben County.

== About ==
=== Student opportunities ===
Programs include work studies, internships, and classes at Trine University’s Middle College.

=== Honors and awards ===
- Indiana Four Star School - 2000, 2001
- Indiana "Best Buy" School - 2000
- New American High School - 1999
- National School-to-Work Site - 1999
- Indiana Blue Ribbon High School - 1997, 1998, 1999

=== Demographics ===
==== 2013 Academic indicators ====
- National Rank: 2,267
- State Rank: 46
- College Readiness Index: 15.0
- Algebra Proficiency: 3.0
- English Proficiency: 2.8
- Student:Teacher Ration: 20:1
- Medal Awarded: Silver
- AP Participation: 29%

== Activities ==
=== Athletics ===
Angola High School is part of the Northeastern Corner Conference for all of its athletic teams.

- Cross Country (girls)
- Cross Country (boys)
- Football
- Golf
- Soccer (boys)
- Soccer (girls)
- Basketball (boys)
- Basketball (girls)
- Cheerleading
- Swimming
- Wrestling
- Baseball
- Gymnastics (girls)
- Outdoor Track & Field
- Softball
- Tennis (boys)
- Tennis (girls)
- Volleyball (girls)

== Notable alumni ==
- Bill Doba – American football player and coach (born 1940), former head Angola High school football coach in the mid-1960s.
- Chris Heroy – American stock car racing crew chief (born 1977)

== See also ==
- List of high schools in Indiana
