= Lakelands, Nova Scotia =

Lakelands, Nova Scotia may refer to one of two places

- Lakelands in Cumberland County
- Lakelands in Hants County
