= Elkhart Christian Academy =

Location
- 25943 County Road 22; Elkhart, Elkhart County, Indiana 46517; United States
- 41.639498°N 85.963329°W

Information
- Type: Private school
- Superintendent: Mr. Jean Milfort
- Principal: Secondary - Mrs. Richelle Viront Elementary - Mrs. Christine Baldridge
- Faculty: 65
- Grades: K to 12
- Enrollment: 622 (2023-2024)
- Color
- Team name: Eagles
- Rivals: Bethany Christian Schools
- Website: Official Website

Elkhart Christian Academy is a private Christian school serving grades K through 12. It is located in Elkhart, Indiana.

== See also ==
- List of high schools in Indiana
