= Clearspring Township, LaGrange County, Indiana =

Clearspring Township
- Township
- Coordinates: 41°34′09″N 85°28′58″W
- Country: United States
- State: Indiana
- County: LaGrange

Government
  - Type: Indiana township

Area
  - Total: 35.98 sq mi (93.2 km^{2})
  - Land: 35.65 sq mi (92.3 km^{2})
  - Water: 0.33 sq mi (0.85 km^{2})
- Elevation: 925 ft (282 m)

Population (2020)
  - Total: 4,662
  - Density: 130.8/sq mi (50.49/km^{2})
- FIPS code: 18-13456
- GNIS feature ID: 453224

Clearspring Township is one of eleven townships in LaGrange County, Indiana. As of the 2020 census, its population was 4,662, up from 4,181 at the previous census.

According to the 2020 "ACS 5-Year Estimates Data Profiles", 38.9% of the township's population spoke only English, while 60.2 spoke an "other [than Spanish] Indo-European language" (basically Pennsylvania German/German).

Clearspring Township was founded in 1837.

== Geography ==
According to the 2010 census, the township has a total area of 35.98 square miles (93.2 km^{2}), of which 35.65 square miles (92.3 km^{2}) (or 99.08%) is land and 0.33 square miles (0.85 km^{2}) (or 0.92%) is water.

== Demographics ==
Historical population
Census	Pop.	Note	%±
1920	1,448		—
1930	1,429		−1.3%
1940	1,466		2.6%
1950	1,619		10.4%
1960	1,833		13.2%
1970	2,162		17.9%
1980	2,778		28.5%
1990	3,248		16.9%
2000	4,005		23.3%
2010	4,181		4.4%
2020	4,662		11.5%
U.S. Censuses:
