= Prairie Heights High School =

Location
- 0245 South 1150 East; LaGrange, Indiana 46761; United States; 41°38′21″N 85°12′01″W

Information
- Type: Public high school
- School district: Prairie Heights Community School Corporation
- Principal: Jeremy Swander
- Teaching staff: 33.50 (FTE)
- Grades: 9–12
- Enrollment: 422 (2023-2024)
- Student to teacher ratio: 12.60
- Colors: Red, white and black
- Athletics conference: Northeast Corner
- Nickname: Panthers
- Website: www.ph.k12.in.us/home/phhs-home

Prairie Heights High School is a public high school located approximately 11 miles east of LaGrange, Indiana, United States.

== Demographics ==
The demographic breakdown of the 424 students enrolled for 2015-16 was:

- Male - 53.1%
- Female - 46.9%
- Native American/Alaskan - 2.6%
- Asian/Pacific islanders - 0.5%
- Black - 0.9%
- Hispanic - 2.6%
- White - 91.5%
- Multiracial - 1.9%

33.7% of the students were eligible for free or reduced-cost lunch. In 2015–16, this was a Title I school.

== Athletics ==
The Prairie Heights Panthers compete in the Northeast Corner Conference. The school colors are red, white and black. The following Indiana High School Athletic Association (IHSAA) sanctioned sports are offered:

- Basketball (girls and boys)
- Cross country (girls and boys)
- Football (boys)
- Golf (girls and boys)
- Soccer (boys)
- Softball (girls)
- Track (girls and boys)
- Volleyball (girls)
- Wrestling (boys)

== See also ==
- List of high schools in Indiana
