= Lakeland Christian School =

Private K-12 School

Coordinates: 28.0244661°N 81.9714714°W

Lakeland Christian School (LCS) is a private Christian school located in Lakeland, Florida. Bible classes are mandatory and they have a weekly chapel. K4-12th grade school grades, their mascot is a viking.
