= Lakeland College =

Lakeland College may refer to:

- Lakeland University (formerly Lakeland College), a university in Sheboygan County, Wisconsin
- Lakeland College (Alberta), a community college system in Vermilion, Alberta and Lloydminster, Alberta and Saskatchewan, Canada
- Lake Land College, a community college in Mattoon, Illinois
- Lakeland Community College in Kirtland, Ohio
