= Butler, Indiana =

- City
- Logo

- Location of Butler in DeKalb County, Indiana.
- Coordinates: 41°25′41″N 84°52′35″W
- Country: United States
- State: Indiana
- County: DeKalb

Government
  - Mayor: Mike Hartman (R)

Area
  - Total: 1.97 sq mi (5.11 km^{2})
  - Land: 1.97 sq mi (5.11 km^{2})
  - Water: 0 sq mi (0.00 km^{2})
- Elevation: 869 ft (265 m)

Population (2020)
  - Total: 2,635
  - Density: 1,334.6/sq mi (515.28/km^{2})
- Time zone: UTC-5 (EST)
  - Summer (DST): UTC-4 (EDT)
- ZIP code: 46721
- Area code: 260
- FIPS code: 18-09532
- GNIS feature ID: 2393482
- Website: www.butler.in.us

Butler is a city in DeKalb County, Indiana, United States. As of the 2020 census, Butler had a population of 2,635.

== History ==
Butler was platted in 1856 when the railroad was extended to that point. It was likely named for David Butler, a pioneer. Butler was incorporated as a town in 1866, and as a city in 1903.

On July 23, 1966, Butler was one of the end points of a record-setting speed run by a New York Central RDC-3, M-497 Black Beetle, modified with a pair of jet engines, as the rail line between it and Stryker, Ohio, was both straight and flat. The car reached a speed of 183.68 mph (295.6 km/h), an American rail speed record that still stands today.

The Downtown Butler Historic District was added to the National Register of Historic Places in 2001.

== Geography ==
According to the 2010 census, Butler has a total area of 2.09 square miles (5.41 km^{2}), all land.

== Demographics ==
Historical population
Census	Pop.	Note	%±
1880	1,056		—
1890	2,521		138.7%
1900	2,063		−18.2%
1910	1,818		−11.9%
1920	1,745		−4.0%
1930	1,643		−5.8%
1940	1,794		9.2%
1950	1,914		6.7%
1960	2,176		13.7%
1970	2,394		10.0%
1980	2,509		4.8%
1990	2,601		3.7%
2000	2,725		4.8%
2010	2,684		−1.5%
2020	2,635		−1.8%
U.S. Decennial Census

=== 2020 census ===
As of the 2020 census, Butler had a population of 2,635. The median age was 35.2 years. 26.5% of residents were under the age of 18 and 13.5% of residents were 65 years of age or older. For every 100 females there were 95.0 males, and for every 100 females age 18 and over there were 94.6 males age 18 and over.

0.0% of residents lived in urban areas, while 100.0% lived in rural areas.

There were 991 households in Butler, of which 36.5% had children under the age of 18 living in them. Of all households, 38.3% were married-couple households, 21.8% were households with a male householder and no spouse or partner present, and 26.4% were households with a female householder and no spouse or partner present. About 27.0% of all households were made up of individuals and 8.1% had someone living alone who was 65 years of age or older.

There were 1,066 housing units, of which 7.0% were vacant. The homeowner vacancy rate was 1.7% and the rental vacancy rate was 11.7%.

Racial composition as of the 2020 census
Race	Number	Percent
White	2,468	93.7%
Black or African American	11	0.4%
American Indian and Alaska Native	12	0.5%
Asian	5	0.2%
Native Hawaiian and Other Pacific Islander	0	0.0%
Some other race	36	1.4%
Two or more races	103	3.9%
Hispanic or Latino (of any race)	110	4.2%

=== 2010 census ===
As of the census of 2010, there were 2,684 people, 951 households, and 668 families living in the city. The population density was 1,284.2 inhabitants per square mile (495.8/km^{2}). There were 1,089 housing units at an average density of 521.1 per square mile (201.2/km^{2}). The racial makeup of the city was 94.9% White, 0.5% African American, 0.4% Native American, 0.2% Asian, 2.3% from other races, and 1.8% from two or more races. Hispanic or Latino of any race were 4.3% of the population.

There were 951 households, of which 43.0% had children under the age of 18 living with them, 44.8% were married couples living together, 15.7% had a female householder with no husband present, 9.8% had a male householder with no wife present, and 29.8% were non-families. 24.4% of all households were made up of individuals, and 7.8% had someone living alone who was 65 years of age or older. The average household size was 2.71 and the average family size was 3.17.

The median age in the city was 33.7 years. 29.3% of residents were under the age of 18; 8.9% were between the ages of 18 and 24; 27.1% were from 25 to 44; 22.7% were from 45 to 64; and 11.9% were 65 years of age or older. The gender makeup of the city was 49.9% male and 50.1% female.

=== 2000 census ===
As of the census of 2000, there were 2,725 people, 983 households, and 699 families living in the city. The population density was 1,523.6 inhabitants per square mile (588.3/km^{2}). There were 1,075 housing units at an average density of 601.1 per square mile (232.1/km^{2}). The racial makeup of the city was 97.69% White, 0.15% African American, 0.18% Native American, 0.11% Asian, 1.25% from other races, and 0.62% from two or more races. Hispanic or Latino of any race were 2.24% of the population.

There were 983 households, out of which 40.5% had children under the age of 18 living with them, 53.8% were married couples living together, 12.1% had a female householder with no husband present, and 28.8% were non-families. 23.6% of all households were made up of individuals, and 8.1% had someone living alone who was 65 years of age or older. The average household size was 2.68 and the average family size was 3.17.

In the city, the population was spread out, with 30.8% under the age of 18, 10.3% from 18 to 24, 30.5% from 25 to 44, 18.3% from 45 to 64, and 10.2% who were 65 years of age or older. The median age was 31 years. For every 100 females, there were 94.9 males. For every 100 females age 18 and over, there were 90.2 males.

The median income for a household in the city was $37,250, and the median income for a family was $42,188. Males had a median income of $32,361 versus $21,404 for females. The per capita income for the city was $15,040. About 5.5% of families and 9.7% of the population were below the poverty line, including 11.7% of those under age 18 and 14.1% of those age 65 or over.

== Government ==
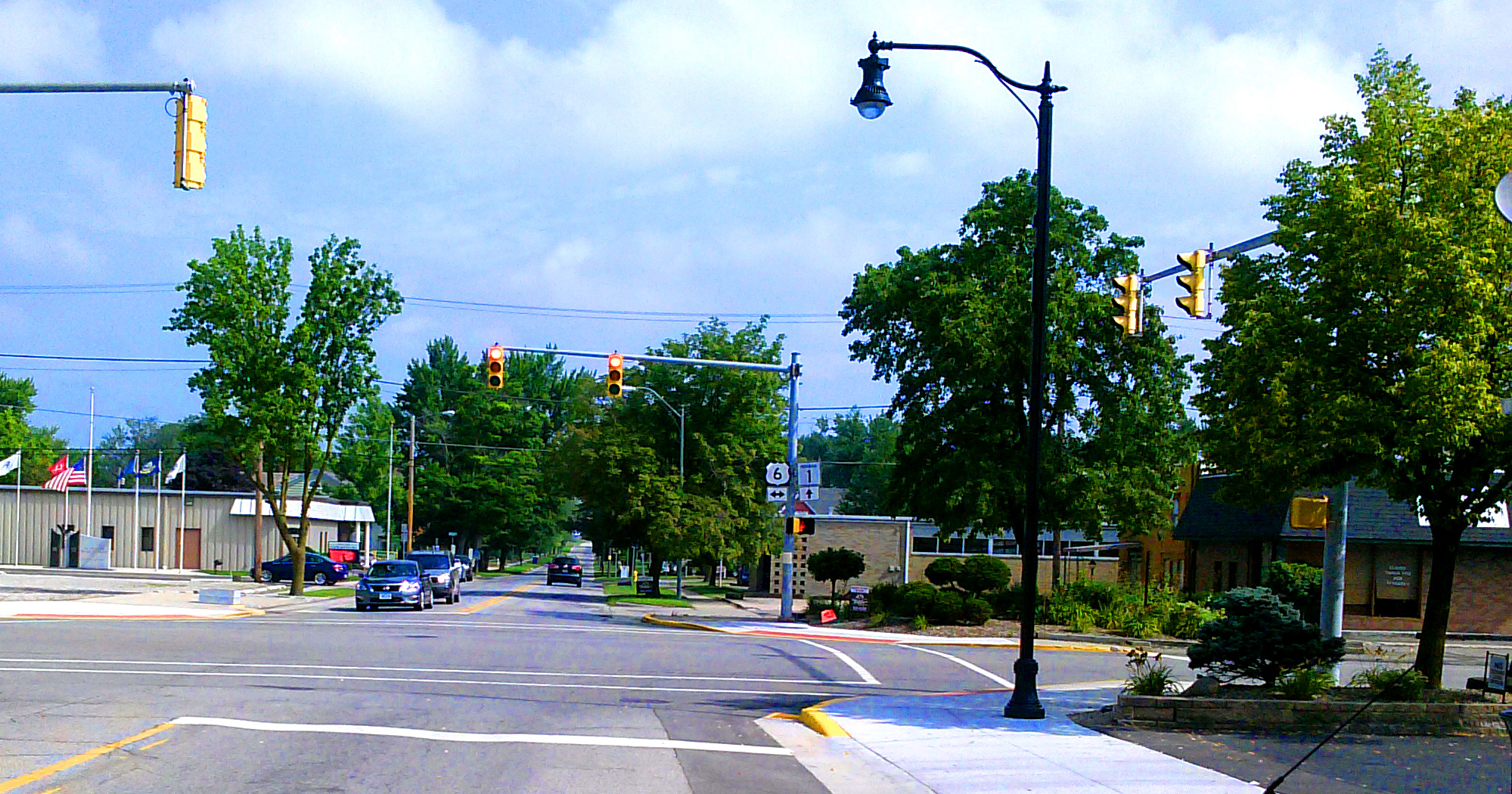
The view from downtown Butler, Indiana, looking north past the major intersection between U.S. Highway 6 and State Road 1.

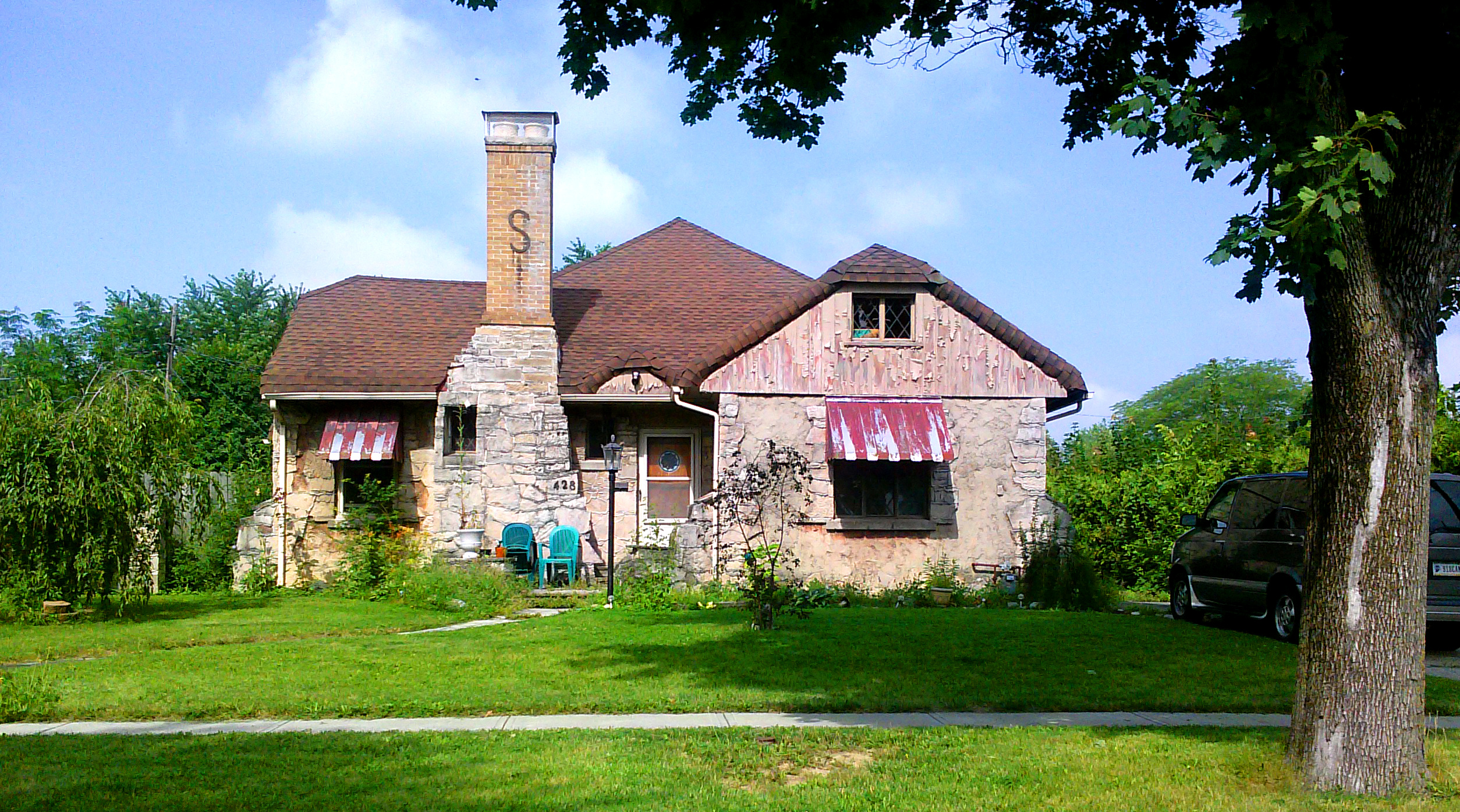
A distinctive home along State Road 1 on the north side of Butler, Indiana

The government consists of a mayor and a Common Council, often referred to as the city council. The mayor is elected in a citywide vote. The city council consists of five members, four of whom are elected from Butler's four individual districts. The remaining councilperson is elected at large. The city council is responsible for hearing and passing ordinances that become law; town meetings occur on the first and third Monday of each month at 7 PM.

== Local newspaper ==
Butler is served by the Butler Bulletin, published weekly by KPC Media. They acquired it in December 2005 from its founder Joe Shelton. Joe had been publishing the newspaper since 1976.

== Education ==
The city of Butler lies in the school district of DeKalb County Eastern Community Schools. The local schools city residents attend are:

- Butler Elementary
- Eastside Junior-Senior High School
- Riverdale Elementary

== Public library ==
The city of Butler is served by the Butler Public Library. The library completed an expansion and renovation project in August 2009, nearly doubling its size. The expansion included a new Children's Department and Story Time Room, a new community room, Teen Zone and Genealogy Room.

== Notable people ==
- Jeff Berry, Ku Klux Klan leader
- Nemo Leibold, outfielder for Chicago White Sox in both the 1917 and 1919 World Series.
