= Homestead High School (Indiana) =

Public high school in Fort Wayne, Indiana, U.S.

Location
- 4310 Homestead Road; Fort Wayne, Indiana 46804; United States; 41°02′39″N 85°17′04″W

Information
- Type: Public, secondary
- Motto: Preparing Today's Learners for Tomorrow's Opportunities
- Established: 1970; 56 years ago
- Locale: Suburban
- School district: Southwest Allen County Schools
- NCES District ID: 1800030
- Superintendent: Joshua D. St. John
- CEEB code: 151103
- NCES School ID: 180003000002
- Principal: Adam Swinford
- Teaching staff: 136.00 (FTE)
- Grades: 9-12
- Enrollment: 2,382 (2024–2025)
- Student to teacher ratio: 17.51
- Color
- Athletics conference: Summit Athletic Conference
- Mascot: Spartan
- Publication: The Spartana
- Yearbook: Retrospect
- School Newscast: HHS In Depth
- Radio Station: WCYT 91.1 FM
- Broadcasting Group: Homestead Live
- Website: homestead.sacs.k12.in.us

Homestead Senior High School, in Fort Wayne, United States, is a public four-year high school. Part of Southwest Allen County Schools, the school receives accreditation from the Indiana Department of Education and the North Central Association of Colleges and Secondary Schools.

== Activities ==
=== Media program ===
Homestead Media is the school's student-run, not-for-profit and award-winning Digital Media Program. The school has Television, Radio and Sports Broadcasting programs that help make up the Homestead Media department.

The TV/video department has a YouTube channel dedicated to its award-winning weekly school news program, HHS In Depth, which has released weekly episodes during the school year on its YouTube channel since 2013. In 2017, Intercollegiate Broadcasting System named HHS In Depth the nation's best school newscast.

The 'live' video department broadcasts Homestead sports and performing arts events live on Homestead Live via the same YouTube channel. Homestead Live covers all home football and basketball (boys and girls) games, along with other sports and performing arts associated with the school.

Homestead won “High School TV Station of the Year” at the Indiana Association of School Broadcasters (IASB) in 2020, 2021 and 2022.

WCYT is the school's student-run, not-for-profit radio station. It has been broadcasting in the city of Fort Wayne since 1995. It features indie-rock music on a 24/7, 365-day basis, along with occasional talk shows. WCYT has won "High School Radio Station of the Year" in 2017, 2018, 2019, 2021, and 2023 at IASB.

=== Publications ===
The Spartana, Homestead's student newspaper, was awarded the NSPA Pacemaker award for its 2002–2003, 2004–2005 and 2008–2009 volumes.

== Sports ==
Homestead has a variety of sports teams and clubs. Homestead's varsity teams compete in the largest class in the state of Indiana. The school belongs to the Summit Athletic Conference for Football and Boys and Girls Basketball but has no conference affiliate for all other sports teams. Their previous conference the Northeast Hoosier Conference disbanded in 2015. Homestead's biggest rival and fellow member of the SAC is the Chargers of Carroll High School.

There are currently 23 Varsity-level sports team (11 boys' sports, 10 girls' sports and two Unified sports teams) at the high school. These sports are sanctioned by the Indiana High School Athletic Association and all teams are eligible to participate in the state of Indiana's championship tournaments.

=== State Championships ===
Taken from IHSAA State Championship History

Sport	Year(s)
Girls Gymnastics (7)	1983, 1984, 1985, 1996, 1999, 2001, 2026
Boys Basketball (1)	2015 (4A)
Girls Basketball (1)	2017 (4A)
Girls golf (1)	2019
Girls Soccer (1)	2021 (3A)
Girls Cross Country (1)	2023

== Controversy ==
On February 8, 2023, Homestead High School became embroiled in a controversy that sparked outrage from members of the community. A student from the school had posted a photo on social media of themselves wearing blackface, which sparked widespread criticism. Prior to this, there were reports of minority students being subjected to slurs and taunts, further igniting the controversy.

=== Reaction and aftermath ===
In response to the incident, students and community members organized protests calling for greater diversity and inclusion within the school. Additionally, there were calls for the administration to take steps to address and combat racism within the institution. Following the incident, a student was arrested for a lunchroom fight that occurred due to racial tensions associated with the incident.

The school district issued a statement condemning the behavior of the student who posted the offensive photo. In August 2023, the school announced a partnership with the Foundation Against Intolerance and Racism (FAIR) to address racial tensions within the school. However, some parents have protested the partnership, citing concerns about the organization's positions on critical race theory and accusations of transphobia. FAIR has also faced criticism for opposing a debt relief program for black farmers.

== Notable alumni ==
- Rob Bowen, catcher, former Major League Baseball player
- Susan Brooks, former member of the U.S. House of Representatives from Indiana's 5th district
- Fletcher Loyer, basketball player
- Ben Skowronek, current NFL wide receiver, Super Bowl 56 Champion
- Caleb Swanigan, former NBA basketball player
- Amelia White, soccer player in the NWSL

== See also ==
- List of high schools in Indiana
- WCYT
