= Lakeland Christian Academy (Indiana) =

Location
- 1093 S 250 East; Winona Lake, Indiana 46590; United States; 41°13′05″N 85°47′40″W

Information
- Type: Private school
- Religious affiliation: Christian
- Established: 1974
- Administrator: Joe Elrod
- Teaching staff: 10.3 (on an FTE basis)
- Grades: 7-12
- Enrollment: 418 (2023-2024)
- Student to teacher ratio: 14.4
- Color
- Athletics conference: Independent
- Nickname: Cougars
- Accreditation: AdvancED
- Website: www.lcacougars.com

Lakeland Christian Academy is a private, non-denominational Christian school located in Winona Lake, Indiana, United States.

== Demographics ==
The demographic breakdown of the 148 students enrolled in 2017–18 was:

- Black - 1.4%
- Hispanic - 2.0%
- Native Hawaiian/Pacific islanders - 2.0%
- White - 94.6%

== Affiliations ==
- NCA CASI - North Central Association Commission on Accreditation and School Improvement

== See also ==
- List of high schools in Indiana
