= DeKalb High School (Indiana) =

Location
- 3424 County Road 427; Waterloo, Indiana 46793; United States
- 41°24′24″N 85°02′26″W

Information
- Type: Public high school
- Established: 1967
- School district: DeKalb County Central United School District
- Superintendent: Steven Teders
- Principal: Marcus Wagner
- Teaching staff: 60.17 (on an FTE basis)
- Grades: 9-12
- Enrollment: 1,052 (2023–2024)
- Student to teacher ratio: 17.48
- Colors: Red, black and white
- Athletics conference: Northeast Eight Conference
- Nickname: Barons
- Website: dhs.dekalbcentral.net

DeKalb High School is a public high school in Waterloo, Indiana. Established in 1967, it is part of the DeKalb Central United School District. The school is just south of Waterloo, but the majority of its students come from the Auburn area. It shares a campus with DeKalb Middle School and the School District's Office.

== Athletics ==
The Dekalb Barons compete in the Northeast Eight Conference. The school colors are red, black and white. The following Indiana High School Athletic Association (IHSAA) sanctioned sports are offered:

- Baseball (boys)
  - State champion - 1980
- Basketball (girls and boys)
- Cross country (girls and boys)
- Football (boys)
  - State champion - 1986
- Unified flag football (coed)
  - State champion - 2021
- Golf (girls and boys)
- Gymnastics (girls)
- Soccer (girls and boys)
- Softball (girls)
- Swim and dive (girls and boys)
- Tennis (girls and boys)
- Track and field (girls and boys)
- Unified track and field (coed)
- Volleyball (girls)
- Wrestling (boys)

== Performing arts ==
DeKalb High School has a vibrant performing arts program. The choir department includes four curricular concert choirs, an extracurricular jazz choir, anda competitive show choir, "Classic Connection". The band department includes two concert bands, two jazz bands, a marching band, the "Baron Brigade", as well as a winter percussion ensemble and a winter color guard ensemble. The theatre department produces five productions each school year, including a fall play, winter musical, a black box show, a spring musical, and a summer K-12 show.

== Notable alumni ==
- Jarrett Grube, Major League Baseball (MLB) pitcher
- MaChelle Joseph, college basketball coach

== See also ==
- List of high schools in Indiana
