= South Adams High School =

South Adams Junior-Senior High School

Location
- 1000 Parkway Street; Berne, (Adams County), Indiana 46711; United States; 40.646727°N 84.958810°W

Information
- Type: Public high school
- School district: South Adams Schools
- Superintendent: Michelle Clouser-Penrod
- Principal: Cory Runkle
- Teaching staff: 29.50(on an FTE basis)
- Grades: 9-12
- Enrollment: 347 (2024–2025)
- Student to teacher ratio: 11.76
- Color
- Team name: Starfires
- Website: sahs.southadams.k12.in.us

South Adams High School is a public high school located in Berne, Indiana, United States.

== Athletics ==
South Adams is currently a member of the Allen County Athletic Conference (ACAC). The following sports are offered at SA:

- Baseball (boys)
  - State Runner-Up (1972)
  - State Qualifier (1982)
- Basketball (boys & girls)
- Cross Country (co-ed)
  - State Qualifier (2013)
- Football (boys)
  - State Runner-Up (2020)
- Golf (boys & girls)
- Soccer (girls)
- Softball (girls)
- Swimming & Diving (boys & girls)
- Tennis (boys & girls)
- Track & Field (co-ed)
- Volleyball (girls)
- Wrestling (boys)

== History ==
The first school in Berne proper was a small two-story brick building, constructed in 1888 on the site of the current City Building. It was enlarged to six classrooms (with a Hall) in 1892, with further renovations in 1909 (making eight classrooms). Originally, the high school course lasted only two years. Later it was extended to three years and finally to four. The first Berne High School class graduated in 1901. This first school building remained in use until 1939, when the new second Berne High School building opened, in a different spot - on the grass lot across from the current Clocktower. This building was renamed "South Adams High School" after consolidation in 1966. Finally, due to the increased enrollment resulting from consolidation, in 1973 the current South Adams High School complex opened south of town. "South Adams" is a consolidation of four area high schools (and former rivals): Berne High School (1899–1966), Geneva High School (1894–1966), Hartford Township High School (1900–1963: "Linn Grove" until 1918), and Jefferson Township High School (1913–1956).

1st Berne High School Building (1888–1939; photo c.1908)

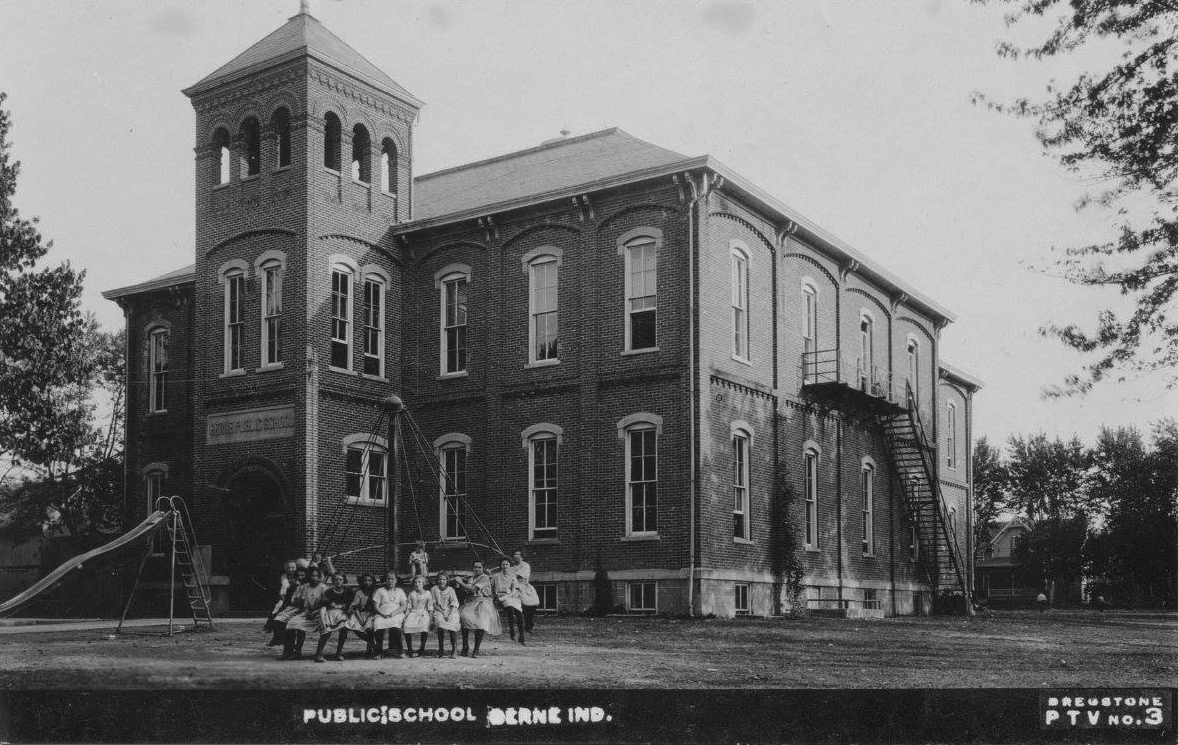
1st Berne High School Building (1888–1939; photo c.1910 after renovations)

2nd Geneva High School Building (1902–1935; photo c.1920)

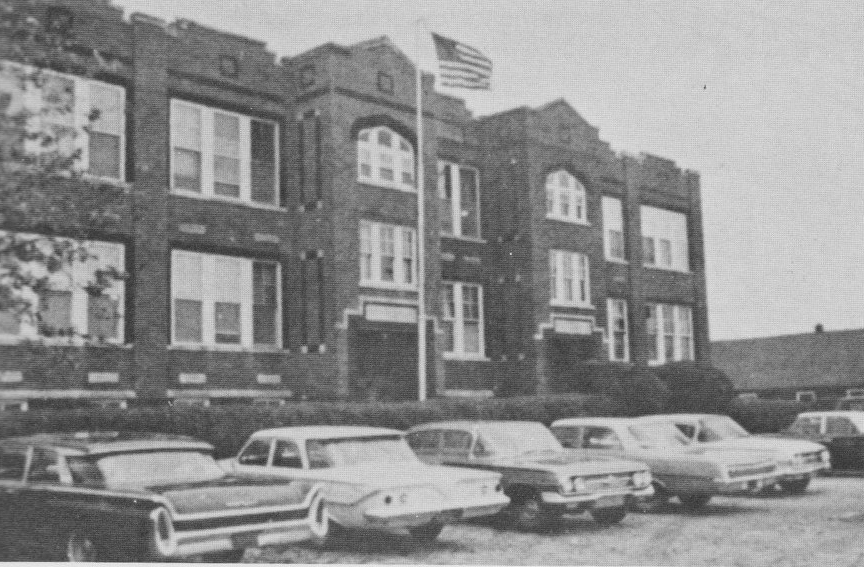
Hartford Township High School (1918–1963; photo 1963)

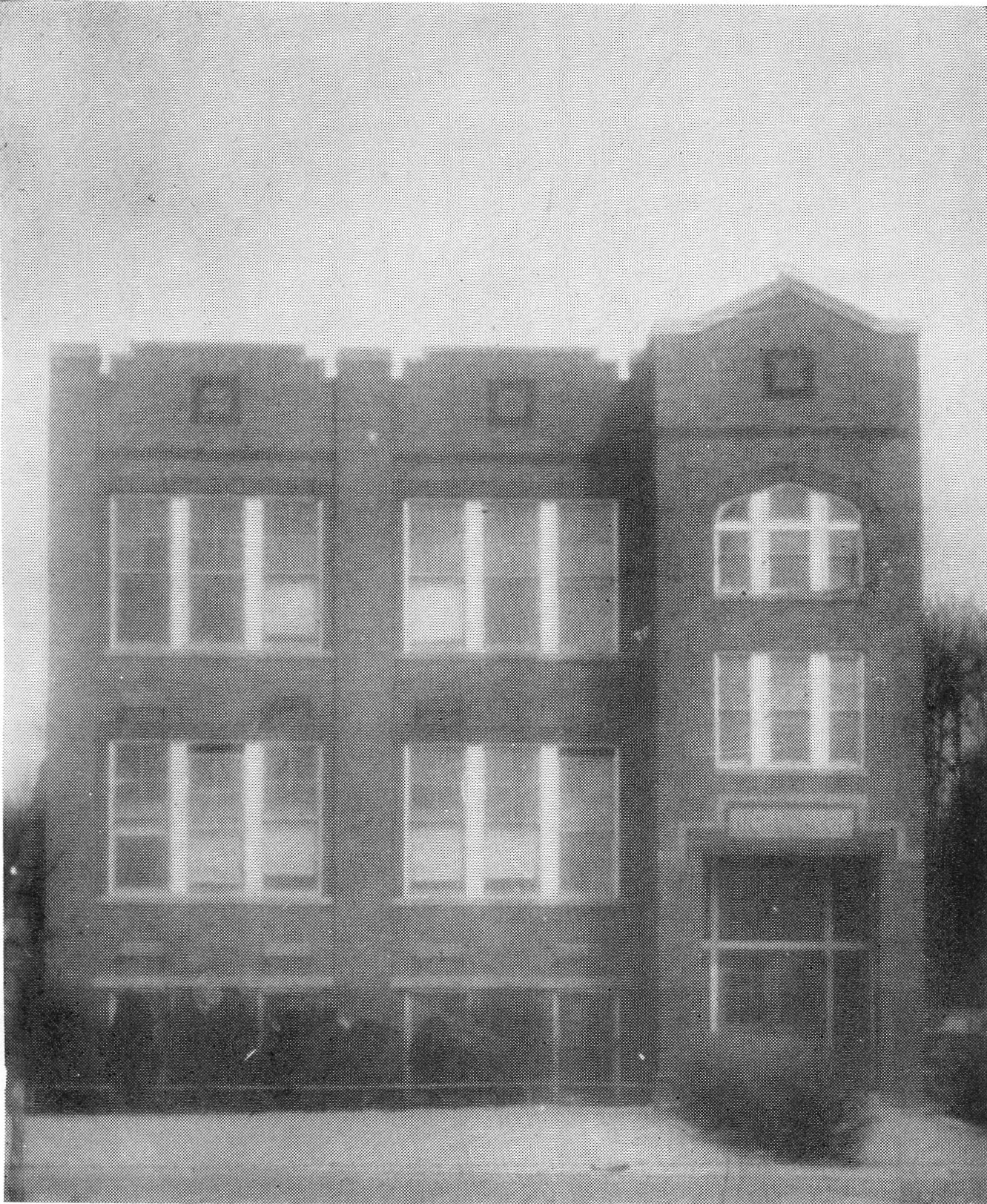
Jefferson Township High School (1913–1956)

== See also ==
- List of high schools in Indiana
- Allen County Athletic Conference
