= Eastside Junior-Senior High School =

Location
- 603 East Green Street; Butler, Indiana 46721; United States; 41°25′53″N 84°51′47″W

Information
- Type: Public
- Established: 1963; 63 years ago
- School district: DeKalb County Eastern Community School District
- Principal: Orie Foster
- Teaching staff: 43.97 (on a FTE basis)
- Grades: 7–12
- Enrollment: 564 (2023–2024)
- Student to teacher ratio: 12.92
- Colors: Kelly green and white
- Athletics conference: Northeast Corner Conference
- Nickname: Blazers
- Website: dekalbeastern.com/schools/eastside-jr-sr-high-school

Eastside Junior-Senior High School is a public secondary school located in Butler, Indiana, United States. The school serves students in grades 7 through 12 for the DeKalb County Eastern Community School District.

== Athletics ==
Eastside is in the Northeast Corner Conference and is a 2A school. The teams are called the Blazers, and the school colors are kelly green and white. The following IHSAA sports are offered at Eastside:

- Baseball (boys)
- Basketball (boys and girls)
- Cross Country (boys and girls)
- Football (boys)
- Golf (boys)
- Soccer (boys)
- Softball (girls)
  - State champions - 1998
  - State champions - 2022
- Wrestling (boys)
- Volleyball (girls)

……….

== Extracurricular activities ==
The school also sponsors the following clubs: Spanish, Dekalb voice, amnesty international, junior high art, science and speech clubs. The school is also the sponsor of various musical groups such as marching band, jazz band, pep band, jazz choir, and junior high show choir.

== Demographics ==
The demographic breakdown of the 625 students enrolled for 2021–22 was:

- Male - 52.8%
- Female - 47.2%
- Native American/Alaskan - 1.0%
- Asian/Pacific islanders - <1.0%
- Black - 1.5%
- Hispanic - 2.5%
- White - 94.7%
- Multiracial - <1.0%

32.0% of the students were eligible for free or reduced lunch.

== See also ==
- List of high schools in Indiana
