= Bellmont High School =

Public high school in Decatur, Indiana, United States

Location
- 1000 North Adams Drive; Decatur, Indiana 46733; United States; 40°50′08″N 84°54′35″W

Information
- Type: Public
- Established: 1967
- School district: North Adams Community Schools
- Principal: Kati Todd
- Staff: 48.50 (on an FTE basis)
- Grades: 9–12
- Enrollment: 613 (2024–2025)
- Student to teacher ratio: 12.64
- Color
- Athletics conference: Northeast Eight
- Nickname: Braves
- Accreditation: North Central Association
- Newspaper: Brave Talk
- Website: bhs.nadams.k12.in.us

Bellmont High School is a public high school located in Decatur, Indiana, United States. It was founded in 1967.

Bellmont is a member of the North Central Association of Colleges and Schools and is rated as a comprehensive high school by the Indiana Department of Education. The school offers many subjects, numerous clubs, and several varsity athletic teams. The boys' athletics teams are known as the Braves, and the girls' teams are called the Squaws.

== History ==
Bellmont High School has been in existence since 1967. It is a consolidation of Decatur Catholic High School, Monmouth High School, and Decatur High School. It was originally located between 3rd and 4th Streets and Jefferson Street. Two years later, the school moved to its current location at 1000 North Adams Drive on the site of the former Bellmont Park. Since that time, the building has been expanded a number of times to include improvements to the expansion of the athletic complexes and the widening curriculum. Bellmont has two gymnasiums as well as facilities for all varsity sports. Bellmont also has a band and arts program. The theatre seats 820.

== Athletics ==
Bellmont competes in the Northeast Eight Conference and offers a variety of competitive sports teams, including baseball, basketball, cheerleading, cross country, football, golf, rifle, soccer, softball, swimming, tennis, track, volleyball, and wrestling.

IHSAA State Championships
Sport	Year(s)
Boys Wrestling (3)	1987, 1988, 1994
Girls Basketball (1)	2026
Football (1)	2009
Girls Volleyball (12)	2007, 2010

== See also ==
- List of high schools in Indiana
