= Hamilton, Indiana =

- Town
- Logo
- Motto(s): "Life is better in Hamilton, Indiana"
- Location of Hamilton in DeKalb County and Steuben County, Indiana.
- Coordinates: 41°32′27″N 84°55′13″W
- Country: United States
- State: Indiana
- Counties: Steuben, DeKalb
- Township: Otsego, Franklin
- Established: c. 1837
- Incorporated: 1914

Government

Area
  - Total: 3.05 sq mi (7.91 km^{2})
  - Land: 2.10 sq mi (5.44 km^{2})
  - Water: 0.95 sq mi (2.47 km^{2})
- Elevation: 912 ft (278 m)

Population (2020)
  - Total: 1,529
  - Density: 727.8/sq mi (281.02/km^{2})
- Time zone: UTC-5 (EST)
  - Summer (DST): UTC-5 (EST)
- ZIP code: 46742
- Area code: 260
- FIPS code: 18-30594
- GNIS feature ID: 2396982
- Website: hamiltonindiana.org

Hamilton is a town located on the border of Steuben County, Indiana and DeKalb County, Indiana. In Steuben County, it is in Otsego Township, and in DeKalb County it is in Franklin Township. The population was 1,529 at the 2020 census.

== History ==
In the late 1830s, the land that present-day Hamilton was built on was sold by the owner Niconar Munson to Dr. Samuel Tuttle, who was the first to plat the town. The original name of the town was "Enterprise". Dr. Tuttle went to New York shortly thereafter, where he met Fisher Howe, president of a syndicate of capitalists. Dr. Tuttle sold all but one-sixteenth of the plat to him for $15,000. In the spring of 1838, Howe sent Sidney Gambia, an agent, to Enterprise to sell goods and develop the settlement. However, Enterprise was heavily ladened with illness that year, to such an extent that it became known for it. To improve the settlement's reputation, the name was changed to Hamilton. Eventually the town was sold to Sidney Gambia for $1 (and for other terms), and the name was officially recorded as the Town of Hamilton in 1844.

A post office was established under the name Enterprise in 1837, and was renamed to Hamilton in 1844. The post office remains in operation.

Hamilton was incorporated as a town in 1914.

== Geography ==
According to the 2010 census, Hamilton has a total area of 3.15 square miles (8.16 km^{2}), of which 2.39 square miles (6.19 km^{2}) (or 75.87%) is land and 0.76 square miles (1.97 km^{2}) (or 24.13%) is water.

The town is served by Indiana Highway 1, Indiana Highway 427, and Bellefontaine Road, which connects to Old US 27 in Pleasant Lake. The town is mainly a resort town that sees an influx of vacationers known colloquially as "lakers" during the summer months. The town is served by the Hamilton Police Department and the Hamilton Volunteer Fire Department. The main feature of the town is its namesake lake which the town was built around. Author Edward Eager vacationed here as a child in the 1920s, and featured the lake and local places like the hotel at Cold Harbor in one of his children's books, “Magic by the Lake”.

A few years ago, the Flegal Brothers Gravel Pit, located on the Northwest end of the lake, was shut down and sold. After getting the go-ahead from state and federal officials, the closed pits were allowed to flood and then the portion of land separating the old gravel pit from the lake was removed and the newly created additions to the lake were named Crystal Bay and Crystal Cove and were sold off to a developer for the construction of new homes.

Neighborhoods in the town include Russels Point, Oakwood, Penn Park, Forest Park, and Island Park.

== Demographics ==
Historical population
Census	Pop.	Note	%±
1920	387		—
1930	357		−7.8%
1940	392		9.8%
1950	376		−4.1%
1960	380		1.1%
1970	537		41.3%
1980	587		9.3%
1990	684		16.5%
2000	1,233		80.3%
2010	1,532		24.2%
2020	1,529		−0.2%
U.S. Decennial Census

=== 2020 census ===
As of the 2020 census, Hamilton had a population of 1,529. The median age was 54.2 years. 15.8% of residents were under the age of 18 and 27.3% of residents were 65 years of age or older. For every 100 females there were 94.8 males, and for every 100 females age 18 and over there were 95.9 males age 18 and over.

0.0% of residents lived in urban areas, while 100.0% lived in rural areas.

There were 727 households in Hamilton, of which 18.7% had children under the age of 18 living in them. Of all households, 52.5% were married-couple households, 18.8% were households with a male householder and no spouse or partner present, and 24.3% were households with a female householder and no spouse or partner present. About 33.3% of all households were made up of individuals and 14.9% had someone living alone who was 65 years of age or older.

There were 1,180 housing units, of which 38.4% were vacant. The homeowner vacancy rate was 2.0% and the rental vacancy rate was 5.8%.

Racial composition as of the 2020 census
Race	Number	Percent
White	1,469	96.1%
Black or African American	6	0.4%
American Indian and Alaska Native	3	0.2%
Asian	0	0.0%
Native Hawaiian and Other Pacific Islander	1	0.1%
Some other race	6	0.4%
Two or more races	44	2.9%
Hispanic or Latino (of any race)	30	2.0%

=== 2010 census ===
As of the census of 2010, there were 1,532 people, 684 households, and 445 families living in the town. The population density was 641.0 inhabitants per square mile (247.5/km^{2}). There were 1,165 housing units at an average density of 487.4 per square mile (188.2/km^{2}). The racial makeup of the town was 98.4% White, 0.3% African American, 0.2% Native American, 0.3% Asian, 0.1% from other races, and 0.8% from two or more races. Hispanic or Latino of any race were 1.1% of the population.

There were 684 households, of which 22.8% had children under the age of 18 living with them, 53.5% were married couples living together, 8.0% had a female householder with no husband present, 3.5% had a male householder with no wife present, and 34.9% were non-families. 29.4% of all households were made up of individuals, and 12% had someone living alone who was 65 years of age or older. The average household size was 2.24 and the average family size was 2.76.

The median age in the town was 47.2 years. 19.8% of residents were under the age of 18; 6.7% were between the ages of 18 and 24; 21.3% were from 25 to 44; 32.9% were from 45 to 64; and 19.3% were 65 years of age or older. The gender makeup of the town was 49.0% male and 51.0% female.

=== 2000 census ===
As of the census of 2000, there were 1,233 people, 517 households, and 348 families living in the town. The population density was 744.5 inhabitants per square mile (287.5/km^{2}). There were 680 housing units at an average density of 410.6 per square mile (158.5/km^{2}). The racial makeup of the town was 98.62% White, 0.08% African American, 0.24% Native American, 0.08% Asian, 0.08% Pacific Islander, 0.32% from other races, and 0.57% from two or more races. Hispanic or Latino of any race were 1.54% of the population.

There were 517 households, out of which 28.6% had children under the age of 18 living with them, 52.6% were married couples living together, 9.7% had a female householder with no husband present, and 32.5% were non-families. 26.9% of all households were made up of individuals, and 13.2% had someone living alone who was 65 years of age or older. The average household size was 2.38 and the average family size was 2.85.

In the town, the population was spread out, with 23.9% under the age of 18, 7.5% from 18 to 24, 28.5% from 25 to 44, 25.1% from 45 to 64, and 15.0% who were 65 years of age or older. The median age was 39 years. For every 100 females, there were 91.8 males. For every 100 females age 18 and over, there were 86.9 males.

The median income for a household in the town was $40,391, and the median income for a family was $47,917. Males had a median income of $36,346 versus $22,219 for females. The per capita income for the town was $19,834. About 6.2% of families and 9.2% of the population were below the poverty line, including 16.1% of those under age 18 and 8.6% of those age 65 or over.

== Education ==
The town of Hamilton lies in the school district of Hamilton Community Schools. The local schools' town residents attend are:

- Hamilton Elementary School
- Hamilton Junior-Senior High School

== Notable people ==
- Edgar "Pop" Buell, humanitarian aid worker in Laos in the 1960s and 1970s.
- James I. Farley, member of U.S. House of Representatives, 1933–1939, was born on a farm near Hamilton.
