= Garrett High School =

Coordinates: 41.348113°N 85.127193°W

- 801 E Houston St; Garrett, Indiana 46738; USA

Information
- Type: Public high school
- Established: 1922
- School district: Garrett-Keyser-Butler Community School District
- Principal: Matt Smith
- Staff: 49.00 (on an FTE basis)
- Grades: 9-12
- Enrollment: 558 (2023–2024)
- Student to teacher ratio: 11.39
- Color
- Athletics conference: Northeast Corner Conference
- Mascot: Railroader
- Rivals: DeKalb Barons
- Website: Official Website

Garrett High School is a 9-12 grade public high school located in Garrett, Indiana.
