= New Haven, Indiana =

- City
- City of New Haven, Indiana
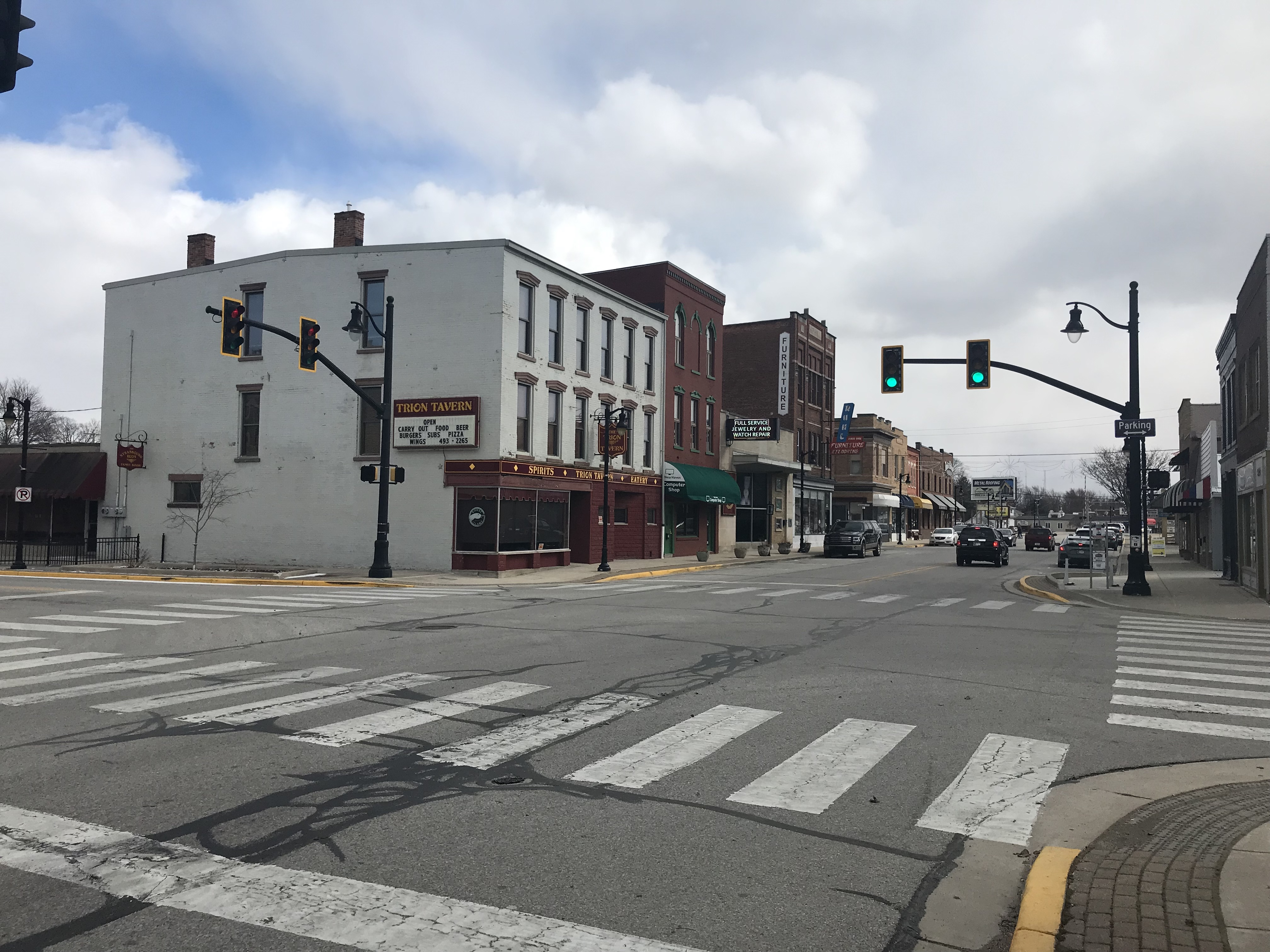
- Downtown New Haven

- Flag Seal Logo

- Location of New Haven in Allen County, Indiana.
- Coordinates: 41°04′16″N 84°59′27″W
- Country: United States
- State: Indiana
- County: Allen
- Township: Adams, Jefferson, St. Joseph
- Platted: 1839
- Incorporated (town): 1865
- Incorporated (city): 1963
- Named after: New Haven, Connecticut

Government
  - Mayor: Steve McMichael (R)

Area
  - Total: 11.83 sq mi (30.64 km^{2})
  - Land: 11.83 sq mi (30.63 km^{2})
  - Water: 0.0039 sq mi (0.01 km^{2}) 0.10%
- Elevation: 768 ft (234 m)

Population (2020)
  - Total: 15,583
  - Density: 1,317.7/sq mi (508.77/km^{2})
- Time zone: UTC−5 (EST)
  - Summer (DST): UTC−4 (EDT)
- ZIP code: 46774
- Area code: 260
- FIPS code: 18-52992
- GNIS feature ID: 2395199
- Website: www.newhaven.in.gov

New Haven is a city in Adams, Jefferson, and St. Joseph townships, Allen County, Indiana, United States. It sits immediately east of the city of Fort Wayne, the second-largest city in Indiana, and is situated mostly along the southern banks of the Maumee River. The population was 15,843 as of 2020.

== History ==
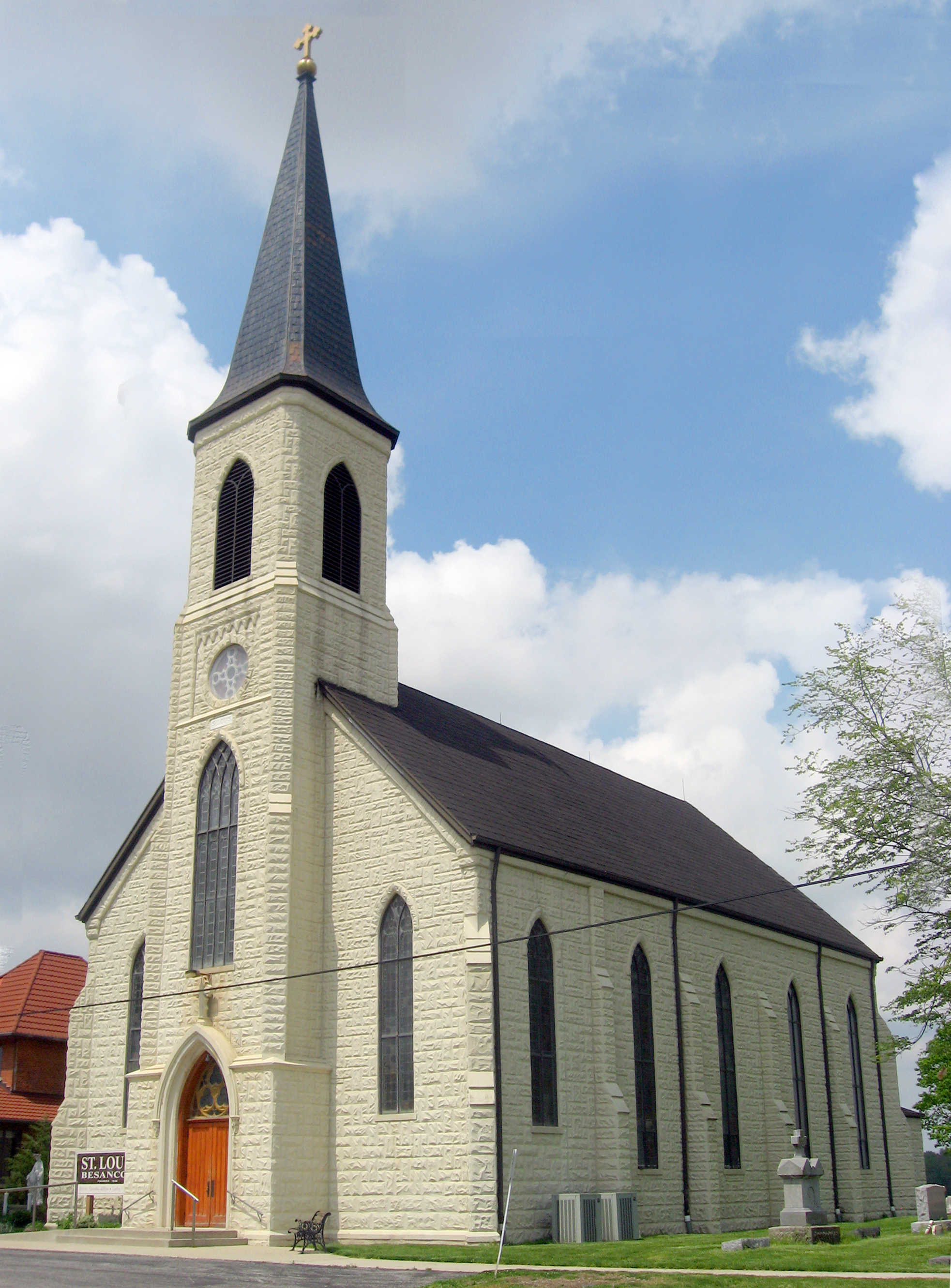
St. Louis Catholic Church, located just southeast of New Haven, is on the National Register of Historic Places.

New Haven was platted in 1839 by Henry Burgess, who named it after New Haven, Connecticut. It was incorporated as a town under Indiana law in 1865. It became incorporated as a city in 1963. Several homes built by the Burgess family remain in New Haven. A Burgess home on Summit Street is the oldest brick structure in Jefferson Township. Henry Burgess' son-in-law, E.W. Green built a large frame Greek Revival house on the hill above what is now Schnelker Park and the former New Haven Elementary School building. Another Burgess structure remains at the corner of Summit and Eben Streets. In the 1850s the Swiss Amish arrived in the region, and what makes them distinct is that they speak an Alsatian German Language.

The Fort Wayne Railroad Historical Society operates east of New Haven on Edgerton Road. The society has restored Nickel Plate 765 built by the Lima Locomotive Works of Lima, Ohio and restored the Craigville Depot, which are housed at the New Haven site.

The French settlement of Besançon, a historic settlement in New Haven, is on the eastern edge of the town along the Lincoln Highway. Saint Louis Catholic Church at Besançon is now on the National Register of Historic Places. Also listed is the Wabash Railroad Depot.

New Haven was the home of a weekly newspaper, Allen County Times, until the summer of 2002. The paper served New Haven, Leo-Cedarville, Grabill, Harlan, Woodburn, Hoagland, and Monroeville.

== Geography ==
According to the 2010 census, New Haven has a total area of 9.875 square miles (25.58 km^{2}), of which 9.87 square miles (25.56 km^{2}) (or 99.95%) is land and 0.005 square miles (0.01 km^{2}) (or 0.05%) is water.

New Haven was the westernmost point of prehistoric glacial Lake Maumee which was an extension of Lake Erie. The bed of Lake Maumee then became the Great Black Swamp, which covered an area between New Haven and present-day Toledo, Ohio. The route of the old Lincoln Highway east of New Haven follows the southern lakebank of glacial Lake Maumee, a notable geological feature.

=== Climate ===
Climate data for New Haven, Indiana
Month	Jan	Feb	Mar	Apr	May	Jun	Jul	Aug	Sep	Oct	Nov	Dec	Year
Record high °F (°C)	69 (21)	73 (23)	90 (32)	90 (32)	99 (37)	106 (41)	103 (39)	102 (39)	100 (38)	91 (33)	79 (26)	71 (22)	106 (41)
Mean daily maximum °F (°C)	31 (−1)	36 (2)	47 (8)	60 (16)	72 (22)	81 (27)	84 (29)	82 (28)	75 (24)	63 (17)	49 (9)	36 (2)	60 (15)
Mean daily minimum °F (°C)	16 (−9)	19 (−7)	29 (−2)	38 (3)	49 (9)	59 (15)	63 (17)	60 (16)	53 (12)	42 (6)	33 (1)	22 (−6)	40 (5)
Record low °F (°C)	−24 (−31)	−19 (−28)	−10 (−23)	7 (−14)	27 (−3)	36 (2)	38 (3)	38 (3)	29 (−2)	19 (−7)	−1 (−18)	−18 (−28)	−24 (−31)
Average precipitation inches (mm)	2.05 (52)	1.94 (49)	2.86 (73)	3.54 (90)	3.75 (95)	4.04 (103)	3.58 (91)	3.60 (91)	2.81 (71)	2.63 (67)	2.98 (76)	2.77 (70)	36.55 (928)
Source: The Weather Channel.

== Demographics ==
Historical population
Census	Pop.	Note	%±
1870	912		—
1880	858		−5.9%
1890	1,079		25.8%
1900	950		−12.0%
1910	1,038		9.3%
1920	1,237		19.2%
1930	1,702		37.6%
1940	1,872		10.0%
1950	2,336		24.8%
1960	3,396		45.4%
1970	5,346		57.4%
1980	6,714		25.6%
1990	9,320		38.8%
2000	12,406		33.1%
2010	14,794		19.2%
2020	15,583		5.3%
Source: US Census Bureau

=== 2020 census ===
As of the 2020 census, New Haven had a population of 15,583. The median age was 39.4 years. 24.0% of residents were under the age of 18 and 18.2% of residents were 65 years of age or older. For every 100 females there were 94.1 males, and for every 100 females age 18 and over there were 93.2 males age 18 and over.

98.5% of residents lived in urban areas, while 1.5% lived in rural areas.

There were 6,390 households in New Haven, of which 30.0% had children under the age of 18 living in them. Of all households, 44.6% were married-couple households, 19.3% were households with a male householder and no spouse or partner present, and 27.9% were households with a female householder and no spouse or partner present. About 29.9% of all households were made up of individuals and 13.0% had someone living alone who was 65 years of age or older.

There were 6,669 housing units, of which 4.2% were vacant. The homeowner vacancy rate was 1.1% and the rental vacancy rate was 5.8%.

Racial composition as of the 2020 census
Race	Number	Percent
White	13,668	87.7%
Black or African American	643	4.1%
American Indian and Alaska Native	60	0.4%
Asian	89	0.6%
Native Hawaiian and Other Pacific Islander	8	0.1%
Some other race	194	1.2%
Two or more races	921	5.9%
Hispanic or Latino (of any race)	707	4.5%

=== 2010 census ===
As of the census of 2010, there were 14,794 people, 200 households, and 3,986 families residing in the city. The population density was 1,498.9 inhabitants per square mile (578.7/km^{2}). There were 6,328 housing units at an average density of 641.1 per square mile (247.5/km^{2}). The racial makeup of the city was 93.2% White, 3.3% African American, 0.4% Native American, 0.4% Asian, 0.1% Pacific Islander, 0.9% from other races,0.16 MLG, and 1.7% from two or more races. Hispanic or Latino of any race were 3.1% of the population.

There were 5,839 households, of which 33.5% had children under the age of 18 living with them, 49.8% were married couples living together, 14.0% had a female householder with no husband present, 4.4% had a male householder with no wife present, and 31.7% were non-families. 26.9% of all households were made up of individuals, and 10.4% had someone living alone who was 65 years of age or older. The average household size was 2.52 and the average family size was 3.05.

The median age in the city was 35.5 years. 26.2% of residents were under the age of 18; 8.4% were between the ages of 18 and 24; 25.6% were from 25 to 44; 25.8% were from 45 to 64; and 13.9% were 65 years of age or older. The gender makeup of the city was 48.1% male and 51.9% female.

== Government ==
New Haven is governed by a mayor-council government. The current mayor is Republican Steven McMichael. Past mayors include Republican Walter Krueck, Republican Herbert Brudi, Republican Terry Werling, Democrat Eugene Taylor, Republican Lynn Shaw, and Democrat-turned-Republican Terry McDonald.

== Education ==
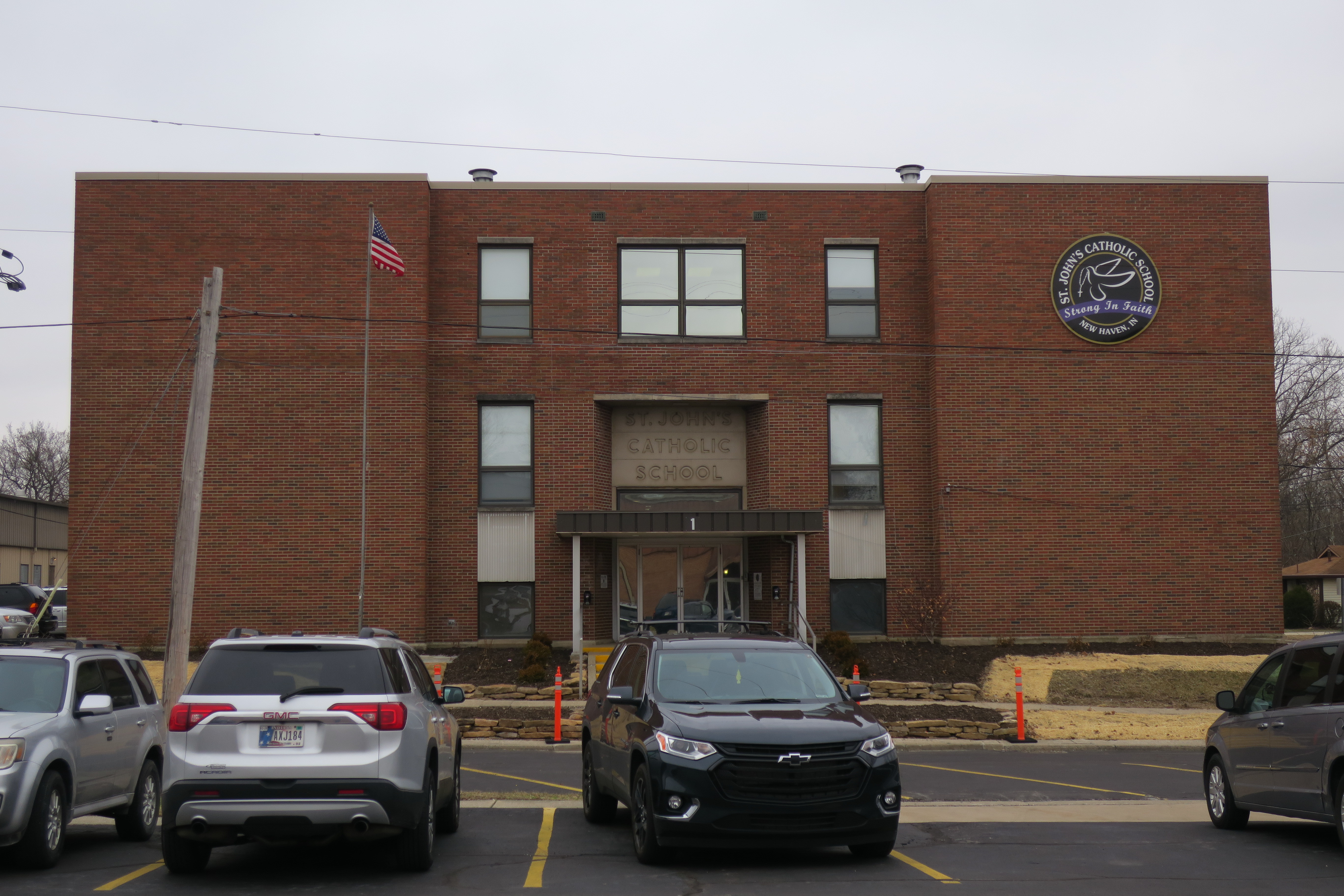
St. John the Baptist Catholic School in New Haven

Almost all of New Haven is in the East Allen County Schools (EACS) public school district. EACS offices are headquartered in New Haven.

Most areas are assigned to New Haven Primary School, New Haven Intermediate School, and New Haven Junior High School/New Haven High School. Previously New Haven Middle School had its own building. As of May 25, 2019, New Haven Middle School is being torn down and grades 7 and 8 will be moving to the High School into the recently added Junior High section. The sixth grade will be moved to the new Intermediate building along with grades 3–5. So when the 2019–2020 school year begins, the only New Haven titled schools in function will be New Haven High and Junior High School, New Haven Intermediate, and New Haven Primary.

Small portions of the city limits are in the Paul Harding Junior High School feeder pattern, the Woodlan Junior/Senior High School feeder pattern, and the Heritage Junior/Senior High School feeder pattern. Another small part of the city is zoned to Fort Wayne Community Schools (FWCS): Haley Elementary School, Blackhawk Middle School, and Snider High School.

Private education is offered through two Catholic schools, Saint John the Baptist Catholic School and Saint Louis Academy, and one Lutheran school, Central Lutheran School.

Allen County Public Library serves residents through the New Haven Library Branch.

== Economy ==
New Haven is surrounded by an abundance of fertile soil, making agriculture the largest visible economic asset. Central States Grain, a large soybean and grain processor, has its operational headquarters in New Haven. O'Neal Steel, the nation's sixth largest steel center, operates a New Haven branch. Other major employers include East Allen County Schools, Norfolk Southern, and BFGoodrich (located in nearby Woodburn, Indiana).

== Notable people ==
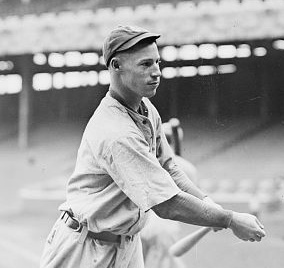
Bubbles Hargrave in 1914.

- David Doster, former player for MLB Philadelphia Phillies
- Allan H. Dougall, recipient of the Medal of Honor.
- Norm Ellenberger, former head coach of the University of New Mexico Lobos and assistant coach to the NBA Chicago Bulls
- Sharon Rose Gabet – Daytime television actress, late 1970s, 1980s.
- Bubbles Hargrave, former player for MLB Chicago Cubs, Cincinnati Reds and New York Yankees
- Pinky Hargrave, former player for MLB Washington Senators, St. Louis Browns, Detroit Tigers and Boston Braves
- Mitchell 'Mitch' V. Harper - lawyer, former Indiana legislator and Fort Wayne City Council president
- Phyllis Pond, Indiana legislator and educator
- Lorna G. Schofield, Judge of the US Southern District Court of New York
