= East Allen University =

Public high school in Fort Wayne, Indiana, US

Location
- 6501 Wayne Trace; Fort Wayne, Indiana 46816; United States; 41°1′37″N 85°4′31″W

Information
- Other name: EAU
- Former name: Paul Harding High School
- Type: Public
- Motto: Blue Jays Soar High!
- Opened: c. 2011
- Locale: Rural: Fringe
- School district: East Allen County School system
- Superintendent: Marilyn Hissong
- Principal: Doug Hicks
- Faculty: 16.90 (FTE)
- Grades: 9-12
- Enrollment: 291 (2024-2025)
- Student to teacher ratio: 17.22
- Schedule type: Alternate Day Block Scheduling
- Hours in school day: 7.5
- Color
- Team name: Blue Jays
- Website: East Allen University

East Allen University (EAU) is a high school within the East Allen County School system in Indiana. Part of the former Paul Harding High School (a traditional grade 7 through 12 junior high / high school), EAU was formed in 2012 after a reorganization that saw the senior high school (grades 9 through 12) divided from the newly created Paul Harding Junior High School (grades 7 and 8).

Not a university in the traditional sense, the name East Allen University refers to the program offered in which students may obtain both a high school diploma and an associate's degree within the four year (grades 9 - 12) program. The associate degree is granted in partnership with Vincennes University, and the credits earned can transfer to any public university within the state of Indiana.

== See also ==
- List of high schools in Indiana
