= Tornado outbreak of August 24, 2016 =

Tornados across Indiana, Ohio and Ontario

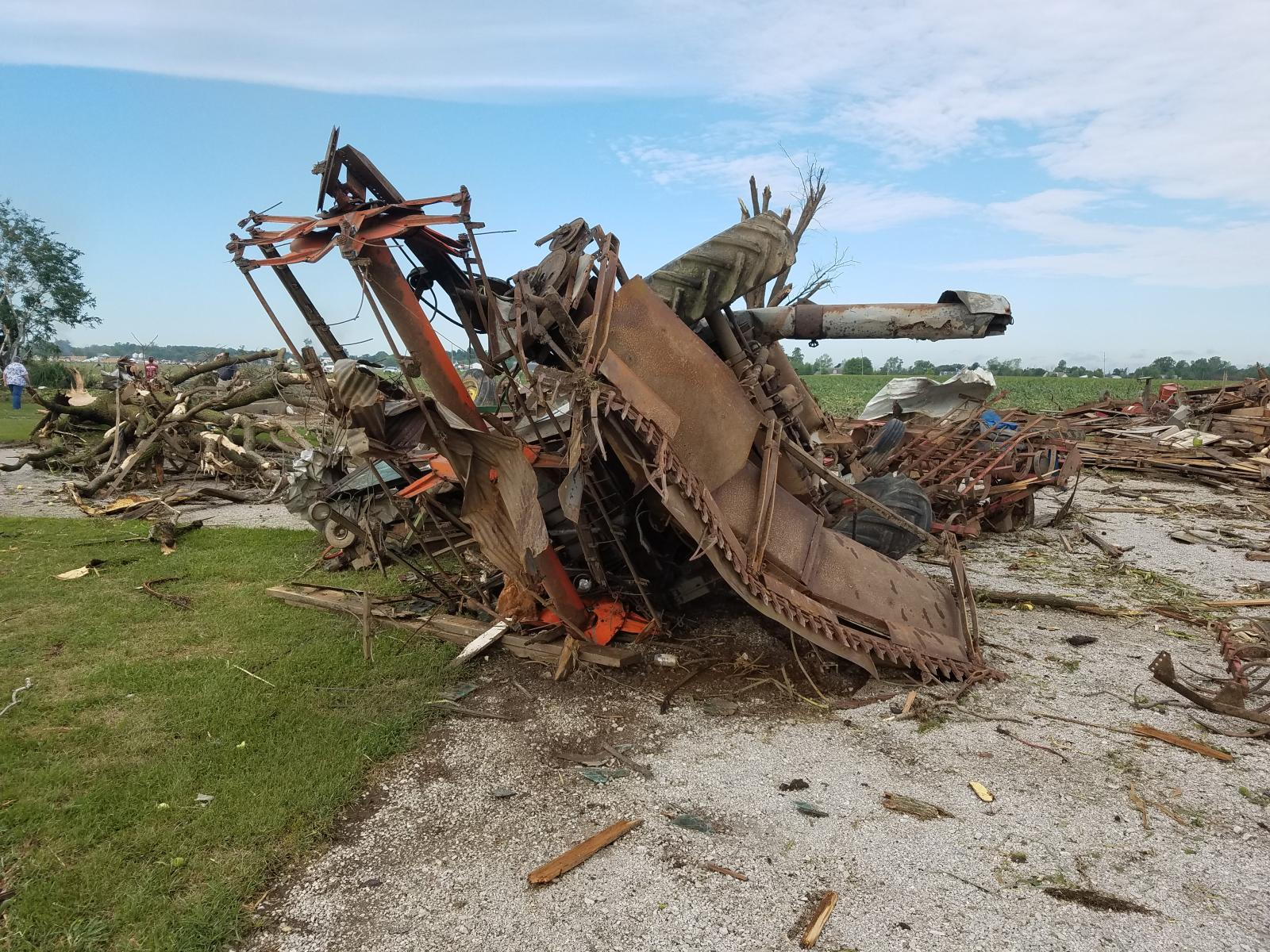
- Farm machinery mangled beyond recognition by a high-end EF3 tornado near Woodburn, Indiana.

Meteorological history
- Formed: August 24, 2016

Tornado outbreak
- Tornadoes: 24
- Max. rating: EF3 tornado
- Duration: 6 hours, 28 minutes
- Highest winds: 160 mph (260 km/h) (near Woodburn, Indiana)

Overall effects
- Injuries: 21
- Damage: >$100 million
- Areas affected: Indiana, Ohio, Ontario
- Part of the tornado outbreaks of 2016

A six-hour tornado outbreak of 24 tornadoes impacted Indiana, Ohio, and Ontario on August 24, 2016. Several of these tornadoes were strong and caused significant damage, including a high-end EF2 tornado that struck Windsor, Ontario, Canada and an EF3 tornado that struck Kokomo, Indiana. This particular tornado outbreak was unusual for multiple reasons, including the fact that it was largely unexpected. The Storm Prediction Center had issued only a slight risk for severe weather that day, with the threat for a tornado or two limited to parts of Kansas, Missouri, Iowa, and Illinois. Despite this, the outbreak unfolded entirely outside of the outlined threat area as numerous supercell thunderstorms developed unexpectedly across parts of the Great Lakes and Ohio Valley, producing numerous tornadoes. Tornado outbreaks of this size and intensity are also not commonly seen during the late summer months across the Ohio Valley region. Despite the damage, no fatalities occurred.

== Meteorological synopsis ==
The tornado outbreak of August 24 was not expected. That morning, the Storm Prediction Center (SPC) issued a level 2/Slight risk of severe weather stretching from northeastern Kansas into western Illinois. However, areas from northern Indiana to northwestern Ohio, where the brunt of tornadic activity occurred later in the day, were only in a level 1/Marginal risk; this risk area was for the threat of damaging winds, as the probability of a tornado within 25 miles (40 km) of any point across regions of Indiana and Ohio was forecast to be less than 2 percent. Throughout the morning and early afternoon hours, several bands of shower and thunderstorm activity overspread Illinois and Indiana, fueled by a boundary separating warmer temperatures to the south and cooler temperatures to the north. With convective available potential energy (CAPE) values around 2,000 J/kg, dewpoints in the low to mid-70s °F, and sufficient vertical wind shear along the boundary, the environment seemed supportive of severe thunderstorms, prompting the SPC to expand the Slight risk eastward into southern Illinois and Indiana. Still, areas across northern Indiana into lower Michigan and Ohio remained in a Marginal risk, as the cloud shield associated with a mesoscale convective vortex over northwestern Illinois was expected to limit instability in these areas.

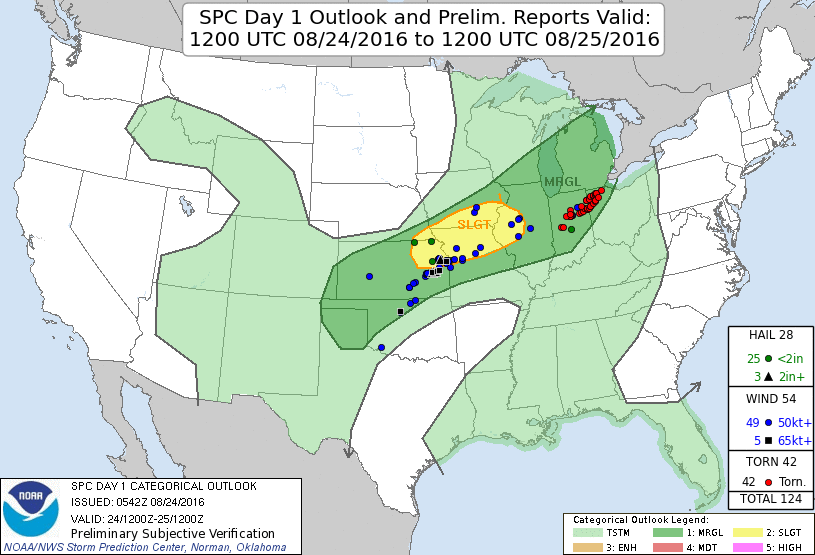
SPC's 12:00 UTC convective outlook with storm reports overlaid

Over the ensuing hours, unusual convective trends unfolded. While the morning line of storms across Illinois and Indiana dissipated, a secondary and more robust cluster of storms developed across eastern Illinois and progressed east by the early afternoon. Typically, discrete supercells congeal into squall lines as storms mature. In this case, however, the line of storms broke down into individual supercells as they tracked across northern Indiana and northwestern Ohio, marking the start of a short-duration but significant tornado outbreak. The first tornado touched down west of Indianapolis, Indiana, at 18:38 UTC (1:38 p.m. CDT). Shortly thereafter, the SPC issued a localized tornado watch for Indiana and Ohio, despite expressing uncertainty over whether one would be needed just an hour before. As the original round of tornado-producing supercells continued east, additional supercells developed throughout the afternoon hours. By the end of the day, a total of 24 tornadoes occurred across Indiana, Ohio, and Ontario in Canada, including a pair of EF3 tornadoes in southern Kokomo, Indiana, and near Woodburn, Indiana. In addition to the rare convective evolution and unexpected nature of the event, it was notable in that large tornado outbreaks are an unusual occurrence in late August.

== Confirmed tornadoes ==
Confirmed tornadoes by Enhanced Fujita rating
EFU	EF0	EF1	EF2	EF3	EF4	EF5	Total
0	12	6	4	2	0	0	24

=== August 24 event ===
List of confirmed tornadoes on Wednesday, August 24, 2016 (Note: All dates are based on the local time zone where the tornado touched down; however, all times are in Coordinated Universal Time for consistency.)
EF#	Location	County / Parish	State / Province	Start Coord.	Time (UTC)	Path length	Max width	Summary
EF2	SE of Crawfordsville	Montgomery	IN	40.0018°N 86.8735°W	18:38–18:48	5.37 mi (8.64 km)	125 yd (114 m)	This tornado damaged 30 homes, with the most severe damage occurring in the Linnsburg area. Extensive damage to trees and barns occurred as well.
EF3	Southern Kokomo	Howard	IN	40.4613°N 86.1884°W	19:20–19:34	8.63 mi (13.89 km)	300 yd (270 m)	This intense tornado caused major damage in the southern part of Kokomo. 1,000 homes were damaged, 170 of which sustained major damage. 80 of these homes were destroyed, some sustaining loss of roofs and exterior walls. Many large trees and power poles were snapped along the path, and the Park Place Apartments were heavily damaged as well. Vehicles were also damaged, including a large truck that was moved 10 ft (3.0 m) from the driveway of a house and flipped over. A Starbucks was completely destroyed, and several people were left trapped inside and had to be rescued. Many sheds and detached garages were destroyed as well, and a receipt from Kokomo was found 30 mi (48 km) away in Marion. This was the strongest tornado to strike Kokomo since 1965, when an F4 tornado devastated the area. 20 people were injured.
EF0	Martindale–Brightwood	Marion	IN	39.8031°N 86.1108°W	20:18–20:19	0.37 mi (0.60 km)	100 yd (91 m)	This tornado briefly touched down in the Martindale–Brightwood neighborhood on the northeastern part of Indianapolis, snapping numerous tree limbs and downing a large but rotten tree. A house had its windows blown out and pieces of its siding removed, while a large commercial building sustained minor roof damage.
EF0	E of Van Buren	Wells	IN	40.6103°N 85.4249°W	20:59–21:00	0.04 mi (0.064 km)	20 yd (18 m)	This brief tornado snapped tree branches, pulled metal siding from a pole barn, and dragged an unanchored wellhouse into a pond.
EF3	NW of Woodburn to E of Harlan	Allen	IN	41.1475°N 84.9187°W	21:27–21:39	5.26 mi (8.47 km)	500 yd (460 m)	This high-end EF3 multiple-vortex wedge tornado damaged several houses, some heavily. One home was swept away with only the subflooring left behind, though the home was poorly anchored and trees in the immediate vicinity sustained only minimal damage. Corn and soybean fields were severely scoured along the path, and many large trees were snapped and uprooted, including a few that were denuded and debarked. Large, well-constructed barns were obliterated, with debris scattered up to a mile away. Two combines from one of the barns were thrown and mangled, one of which was found 200 yd (180 m) away. A dump truck from the same location was thrown and had its cab and engine ripped from the frame, while a nearby car was carried at least 585 yd (535 m) into a field. A large, well-anchored barn was swept away at another location, with three vehicles stored inside being destroyed. Many other small outbuildings were damaged or destroyed as well. Surveyors noted that the extreme vehicle and machinery damage suggests possible EF4 intensity, but were unable to do so due to them not being damage indicators.
EF1	ESE of Flora to NNE of Kokomo	Carroll, Howard	IN	40.5280°N 86.4309°W	21:40–22:22	17.06 mi (27.46 km)	100 yd (91 m)	Several barns suffered partial wall and roof damage along the path, while a garage slid off its foundation. Trees and crops were damaged throughout the path, and wooden power poles were bent over.
EF1	N of Berne	Adams	IN	40.6832°N 85.0247°W	21:49–22:03	7.56 mi (12.17 km)	50 yd (46 m)	This tornado followed a skipping path, occasionally touching down in corn and bean fields. Several taller barn structures suffered partial roof loss, with debris thrown several hundred yards. Large trees had broken limbs while smaller trees were knocked down or uprooted.
EF2	NE of Antwerp to SE of Mark Center	Paulding, Defiance	OH	41.2220°N 84.6813°W	21:53–22:04	4.42 mi (7.11 km)	250 yd (230 m)	This strong multiple-vortex tornado passed near the town of Cecil, causing extensive damage to farmsteads. Homes had their roofs torn off and were shifted off of their foundations, and the newer addition of one farm home was completely destroyed. Two mobile homes were blown off of their foundations. Vehicles, barns, garages, and outbuildings were destroyed, and many large trees were snapped and uprooted along the path as well.
EF0	Peru	Miami	IN	40.7740°N 86.0796°W	22:13–22:14	0.06 mi (0.097 km)	20 yd (18 m)	This brief tornado damaged shingles at a medical center and downed large tree limbs.
EF2	N of Defiance	Defiance	OH	41.3231°N 84.3803°W	22:28–22:34	2.64 mi (4.25 km)	400 yd (370 m)	Trees and tree limbs were snapped, the roof was torn from a business, and power poles were snapped as well. A house sustained roof damage, a storage building collapsed, and barns and outbuildings were destroyed. One person was injured.
EF1	W of Van Wert	Van Wert	OH	40.8241°N 84.7257°W	22:30–22:41	5.45 mi (8.77 km)	75 yd (69 m)	This tornado skipped along its path. Trees were uprooted and snapped. One home sustained roof and siding damage, while mud was thrown onto a nearby garage, which sustained minor damage. A large barn lost its roof. Small gravestones were moved.
EF0	NW of Van Wert	Van Wert	OH	40.8878°N 84.6698°W	22:41–22:45	1.47 mi (2.37 km)	25 yd (23 m)	A secondary spin-up tornado damaged corn and bean crops.
EF1	W of Napoleon	Henry	OH	41.3823°N 84.2161°W	22:48–22:54	2.8 mi (4.5 km)	150 yd (140 m)	This tornado touched down multiple times. It broke tree limbs and caused roof damage to several homes. A storage building was severely damaged, a barn was destroyed, and several silos were moved off their foundations.
EF0	NE of Van Wert	Van Wert	OH	40.9108°N 84.5538°W	22:51–23:04	4.65 mi (7.48 km)	40 yd (37 m)	This tornado mainly caused damage to corn and bean crops. It lifted at one point near the middle of the path.
EF0	Indian Heights	Howard	IN	40.4335°N 86.1217°W	22:58–23:00	0.67 mi (1.08 km)	75 yd (69 m)	Homes and trees were damaged.
EF1	LaSalle, ON	Wayne (MI), Essex (ON)	MI, ON	—N/a	~23:00–?	2.9 mi (4.6 km)	250 m (270 yd)	This tornado first began over the Detroit River and moved across Grassy Island, causing tree damage. A marina on the Ontario shore of the Detroit River sustained damage to trees, and two aluminum boats and a shed were tossed. Further inland, several homes sustained damage to their roofs, doors, or windows, including one home that had a quarter of its roof removed. More large trees were snapped or uprooted, and a hydro pole was snapped and thrown a short distance.
EF1	S of Russiaville	Howard	IN	40.3993°N 86.2714°W	23:00–23:02	1.5 mi (2.4 km)	50 yd (46 m)	One garage was damaged, and trees and crops were damaged throughout the path.
EF0	NE of Van Wert	Van Wert	OH	40.9602°N 84.4437°W	23:04–23:10	2.46 mi (3.96 km)	20 yd (18 m)	The tornado mainly caused damage to corn and bean crops.
EF2	Windsor	Essex	ON	—N/a	23:15–?	7.9 mi (12.7 km)	200 m (220 yd)	This high-end EF2 tornado caused major damage to factories and industrial buildings along the E.C. Row Expressway. This included a metal frame warehouse structure that was flattened. Multiple vehicles were severely damaged, including several large cube vans that were dragged through a parking lot. Garbage dumpsters were thrown up to 120 metres (130 yd) away, power poles were snapped, and large amounts of sheet metal were wrapped around guard rails and power lines. Numerous trees were downed, and multiple homes sustained damage in residential areas, at least a dozen of which sustained significant structural damage.
EF0	S of Kokomo	Howard	IN	40.4038°N 86.1562°W	23:16–23:21	2.95 mi (4.75 km)	75 yd (69 m)	This tornado bent a road sign and caused damage to a billboard and trees.
EF0	ESE of Liberty Center	Henry	OH	41.4342°N 83.9518°W	23:19–23:20	0.01 mi (0.016 km)	20 yd (18 m)	This tornado briefly touched down in a field and damaged crops.
EF0	Dupont	Putnam	OH	41.0479°N 84.3071°W	23:26–23:29	1.23 mi (1.98 km)	25 yd (23 m)	This tornado moved directly through Dupont, damaging trees, roofs, siding, and crops, and lifted water from the Auglaize River.
EF0	NE of Continental	Putnam, Henry	OH	41.1678°N 84.1814°W	23:48–23:50	0.64 mi (1.03 km)	15 yd (14 m)	This very brief tornado touched down in a field.
EF0	SW of Pemberville	Wood	OH	41.3591°N 83.5246°W	01:06	0.04 mi (0.064 km)	20 yd (18 m)	This tornado touched down and immediately lifted. A storage building lost much of its sheet-metal roof, with debris carried into nearby trees.

== See also ==
- List of North American tornadoes and tornado outbreaks
