= New Haven High School (Indiana) =

Public high school in New Haven, Indiana, U.S.

New Haven Jr/Sr High School

Location
- 1300 Green Road; New Haven, (Allen County), Indiana 46774; United States; 41.06521°N 85.01148°W

Information
- Type: Public, Coeducational
- Motto: Promote Respect, Foster Pride, and Inspire Excellence
- School district: East Allen County School Corporation
- Superintendent: Marliyn Hissong
- Principal: Patty Meadows
- Teaching staff: 92.03 (FTE)
- Grades: 7–12
- Enrollment: 1,413 (2024-2025)
- Student to teacher ratio: 15.35
- Colors: Purple and gold
- Athletics conference: Northeast8 (NE8)
- Mascot: Bulldog
- Newspaper: The Herald
- Yearbook: The Mirage
- Website: nhh.eacs.k12.in.us

New Haven High School is a public secondary education school for grades nine through twelve. New Haven High School is one of five high schools in the East Allen County Schools district, Indiana. The district has adopted a unique method called “five campus”, meaning a student can take a class offered at any one of the schools in the district.

== History ==
The first school in New Haven was built downtown in 1885. The first true high school was built in 1923 and was officially called the Adams-Township school, although everyone referred to it as New Haven school. It accommodated kindergarten through 12th grade. In the 1940s a separate building was put up next to this school to house the elementary grades. In 1955 and 1957 additions were made to the high school to allow for the growing student population. To further aid with the growth a middle school was built across the street on the high school's football field and track.

Soon enough it was time to build a new high school. The high school moved to a piece of land across the highway. The middle school moved into the old high school and the elementary moved into the middle school. The elementary is now used for offices and has a newly renovated auditorium that is used for special performances.

The current New Haven High School was built in 1975 and opened in 1977. The building is located on a 24-acre (97,000 m^{2}) property – the smallest amount of land of any school in its district. It cost approximately $7 million to build. The gym is a smaller version of the nearby Harding High School gym. The school was originally designed to accommodate 1500 students. Recently the school has had some modifications to classrooms to allow for different kinds of classes. Currently, the school's capacity is 1030. This is the first school in the district to have an elevator in it. The principal of the school when it opened was Paul Goeglein.

New Haven Middle School was its own building until 2019, when grades were reconfigured, with a junior high school attached to New Haven High School.

== Notable alumni ==
- Norm Ellenberger, former (retired) college basketball coach, New Mexico Lobos
- Matt Bischoff, MLB player for the New York Mets and the Seattle Mariners

== See also ==
- List of high schools in Indiana
- Northeast Eight Conference
- New Haven, Indiana
