= Poe, Indiana =

- Unincorporated community
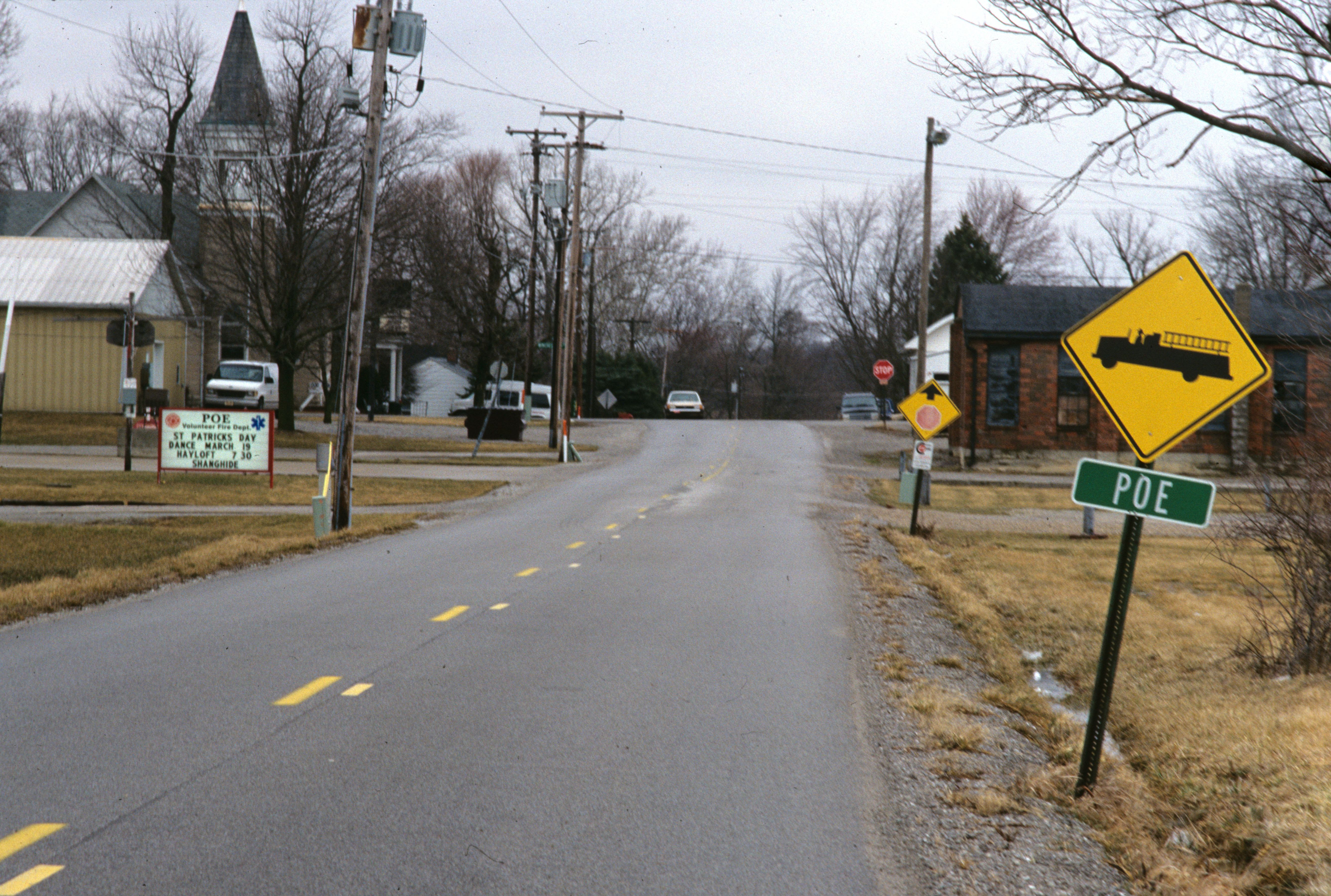
- Poe streetscape in 1998

- Location within Indiana Location within the United States
- Coordinates: 40°56′09″N 85°05′13″W
- Country: United States
- State: Indiana
- County: Allen County
- Township: Marion
- Elevation: 797 ft (243 m)
- Time zone: UTC-5 (Eastern (EST))
  - Summer (DST): UTC-4 (EDT)
- ZIP code: 46819
- Area code: 260
- GNIS feature ID: 441382

Poe is an unincorporated community in Marion Township, Allen County, in the U.S. state of Indiana.

It has about two city blocks of area. Namita Kamath of The Journal Gazette wrote that "Poe is frequently associated with Hoagland".

== History ==
Poe was first named Williamsport, in honor of landowner William Essig, but it was changed because the U.S. postal authorities refused to accept that name, there being another post office in the state with a similar name.

== Geography ==
Poe has a downtown. In 1995 Kamath quoted an area resident who stated that Poe's downtown had much less activity than it had previously.

== Infrastructure ==
The fire department building moved onto land donated by an area individual in the 1960s.

A post office was established at Poe in 1856, and remained in operation until it was discontinued by 1917. The Fort Wayne, Indiana post office serves Poe as of 1997.

In 1956 the Poe Southwestern Telephone Association was issuing One share of Capital Stock for $25 per share.

== Education ==
The East Allen County Schools district includes Poe, and Heritage Elementary School and Heritage Junior/Senior High School are the facilities Poe is zoned to.

== Religion ==
Poe and Hoagland share a Methodist congregation, Hope United Methodist Church, located outside of the Hoagland CDP. There were previously two separate congregations, Poe (Williamsport) United Methodist Church and Hoagland United Methodist Church (originally Middletown Methodist Church), which merged into Hope in 1995. The former Poe church was to be converted for residential use.

== Recreation ==
Poe Days is an annual celebration to help fund the fire department.
