= East Liberty, Indiana =

- Unincorporated community
- Location within Indiana Location within the United States
- Coordinates: 40°56′08″N 84°51′42″W
- Country: United States
- State: Indiana
- County: Allen County
- Township: Monroe
- Platted: 1848
- Elevation: 807 ft (246 m)
- Time zone: UTC-5 (Eastern (EST))
  - Summer (DST): UTC-4 (EDT)
- ZIP code: 46773
- Area code: 260
- GNIS feature ID: 433917

East Liberty is an unincorporated community in Monroe Township, Allen County, in the U.S. state of Indiana.

== History ==
East Liberty was laid out in 1848. A post office was established at East Liberty in 1850, and remained in operation until it was discontinued in 1866.
