= Tillman, Indiana =

- Unincorporated community
- Location within Indiana Location within the United States
- Coordinates: 41°01′27″N 84°53′36″W
- Country: United States
- State: Indiana
- County: Allen
- Township: Jefferson
- Established: 1898
- Elevation: 778 ft (237 m)
- Time zone: UTC-5 (Eastern (EST))
  - Summer (DST): UTC-4 (EDT)
- ZIP code: 46773
- Area code: 260
- GNIS feature ID: 444761

Tillman is an unincorporated community in Jefferson Township, Allen County, in the U.S. state of Indiana.

== History ==
Tillman was established in 1898.
