= St. Louis, Besancon, Historic District =

Historic church in Indiana, United States

- U.S. National Register of Historic Places
- U.S. Historic district
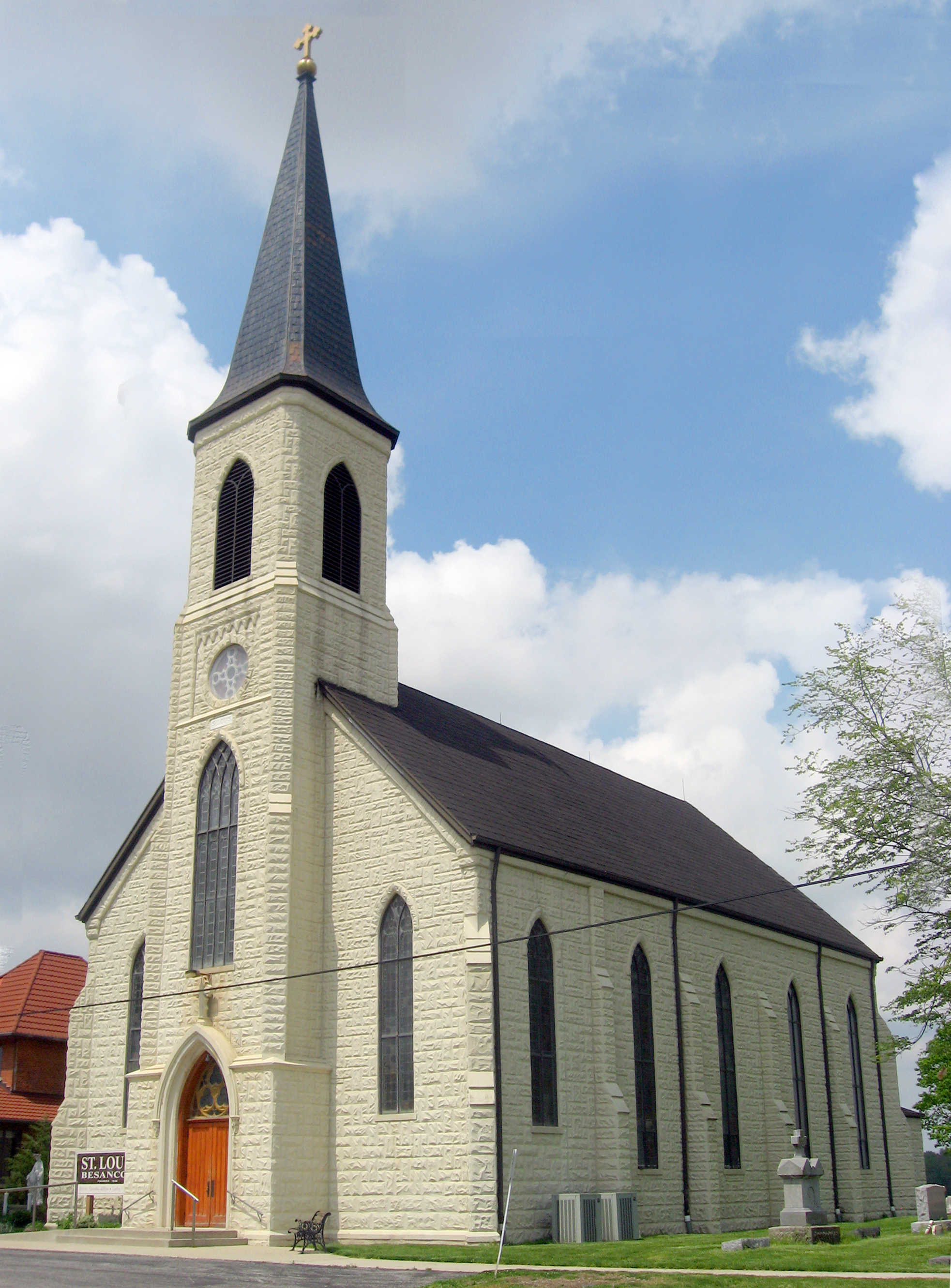
- Front and eastern side of the church

- Location within Indiana Location within the United States
- Nearest city: New Haven, Indiana
- Coordinates: 41°3′3″N 84°56′20″W
- Area: 10 acres (4.0 ha)
- Built: 1870-1871, 1893, 1915
- Architect: Frank Sallier
- Architectural style: Late 19th and 20th Century Revivals, Queen Anne, Gothic
- NRHP reference No.: 95001112
- Added to NRHP: September 22, 1995

St. Louis, Besancon, Historic District is a historic Roman Catholic church complex and national historic district located near New Haven in Jefferson Township, Allen County, Indiana. The district encompasses five contributing buildings and one contributing site consisting of the Saint Louis Besancon Roman Catholic Church and its cemetery and rectory. The Gothic Revival style church was built in 1870-71 of brick, fired in a nearby kiln, then covered with cement to give an appearance of stone. It features a steep gable roof and five part projecting square steeple. The rectory was built in 1893, and is a 2 1/2-story, Queen Anne style brick dwelling. The other contributing resources are the St. Louis Academy (1915), St. Louis Convent House (1915), garage (1940), and Old St. Louis Cemetery. The church was refurbished and painted in 1998.

The district was listed on the National Register of Historic Places in 1995.
