= Marion Township, Allen County, Indiana =

Marion Township
- Township
- Location in Allen County, Indiana
- Coordinates: 40°57′43″N 85°03′24″W
- Country: United States
- State: Indiana
- County: Allen

Government
  - Type: Indiana township

Area
  - Total: 34.88 sq mi (90.35 km^{2})
  - Land: 34.65 sq mi (89.75 km^{2})
  - Water: 0.23 sq mi (0.59 km^{2}) 0.66%
- Elevation: 804 ft (245 m)

Population (2020)
  - Total: 3,838
  - Density: 110/sq mi (43/km^{2})
- ZIP codes: 46733, 46745, 46777, 46816, 46819
- GNIS feature ID: 0453602

Marion Township is one of 20 townships in Allen County, Indiana, United States. As of the 2010 census, its population was 3,858.

== History ==
In September, 1834, the Commissioners of Allen County created Root Township, which embraced all of present-day Marion Township, as well as a portion of present-day Adams County. Adams County was created on February 7, 1835, leaving only a portion of Root Township still in Allen County. In August, 1835, this remainder of Root Township was reorganized and renamed Marion Township.

== Geography ==
According to the United States Census Bureau, Marion Township covers an area of 34.88 square miles (90.35 km^{2}); of this, 34.65 square miles (89.75 km^{2}) is land and 0.23 square miles (0.59 km^{2}), or 0.66 percent, is water.

=== Unincorporated towns ===
- Hessen Cassel at 40.977826°N 85.079136°W
- Poe at 40.935881°N 85.086914°W
- Soest at 40.996157°N 85.037435°W

(This list is based in part on USGS data and may include former settlements.)

=== Adjacent townships ===
- Adams Township (north)
- Jefferson Township (northeast)
- Madison Township (east)
- Root Township, Adams County (southeast)
- Preble Township, Adams County (south)
- Jefferson Township, Wells County (southwest)
- Pleasant Township (west)
- Wayne Township (northwest)

=== Cemeteries ===
The township contains the following cemeteries: Antioch Lutheran, Bethel Baptist (defunct), Coleman family (defunct), Emmanuel Lutheran, Hall (disappeared), Morton family (defunct), Poe/Williamsport, St. John's Lutheran (defunct), St. Joseph Hessen Cassel Roman Catholic, St. Paul's Lutheran (defunct), and Thompson family (defunct).

=== Major highways ===
- I-469 (Ronald Reagan Expressway)
- US 24
- US 27
- US 33

=== Rivers ===
- St. Marys River

== School districts ==
- East Allen County Schools

== Political districts ==
- Indiana's 3rd congressional district
- State House District 79
- State Senate District 19
