= Cuba, Indiana =

- Unincorporated community
- Location within Indiana Location within the United States
- Coordinates: 41°11′08″N 84°56′19″W
- Country: United States
- State: Indiana
- County: Allen
- Township: Springfield
- Elevation: 781 ft (238 m)
- Time zone: UTC-5 (Eastern (EST))
  - Summer (DST): UTC-4 (EDT)
- ZIP code: 46743
- Area code: 260
- GNIS feature ID: 433233

Cuba is an unincorporated town in Springfield Township, Allen County, in the U.S. state of Indiana. Cuba Mennonite School is located here, as is the Cuba Mennonite Church.

== History ==
Cuba was platted in 1855. It was named after the island nation of Cuba.

== Geography ==
Cuba is located on Highway 37, also known as Maysville Road. Cuba Road extends north from Cuba, and Thimlar Road extends to the south.
