= Hessen Cassel, Indiana =

- Unincorporated community and Census-designated place
- Location within Indiana Location within the United States
- Coordinates: 40°58′38″N 85°04′20″W
- Country: United States
- State: Indiana
- County: Allen
- Township: Marion
- Elevation: 797 ft (243 m)
- Time zone: UTC-5 (Eastern (EST))
  - Summer (DST): UTC-4 (EDT)
- ZIP code: 46816
- Area code: 260
- GNIS feature ID: 2830305

Hessen Cassel is an unincorporated community in Marion Township, Allen County, in the U.S. state of Indiana.

== History ==
Hessen Cassel was platted in 1863. Hessen Cassel was originally built up chiefly by Germans, and was named for the Landgraviate of Hesse-Kassel in Germany.

== Demographics ==
The United States Census Bureau delineated Hessen Cassel as a census designated place in the 2022 American Community Survey.
