= Trai Essex =

American football player (born 1982)

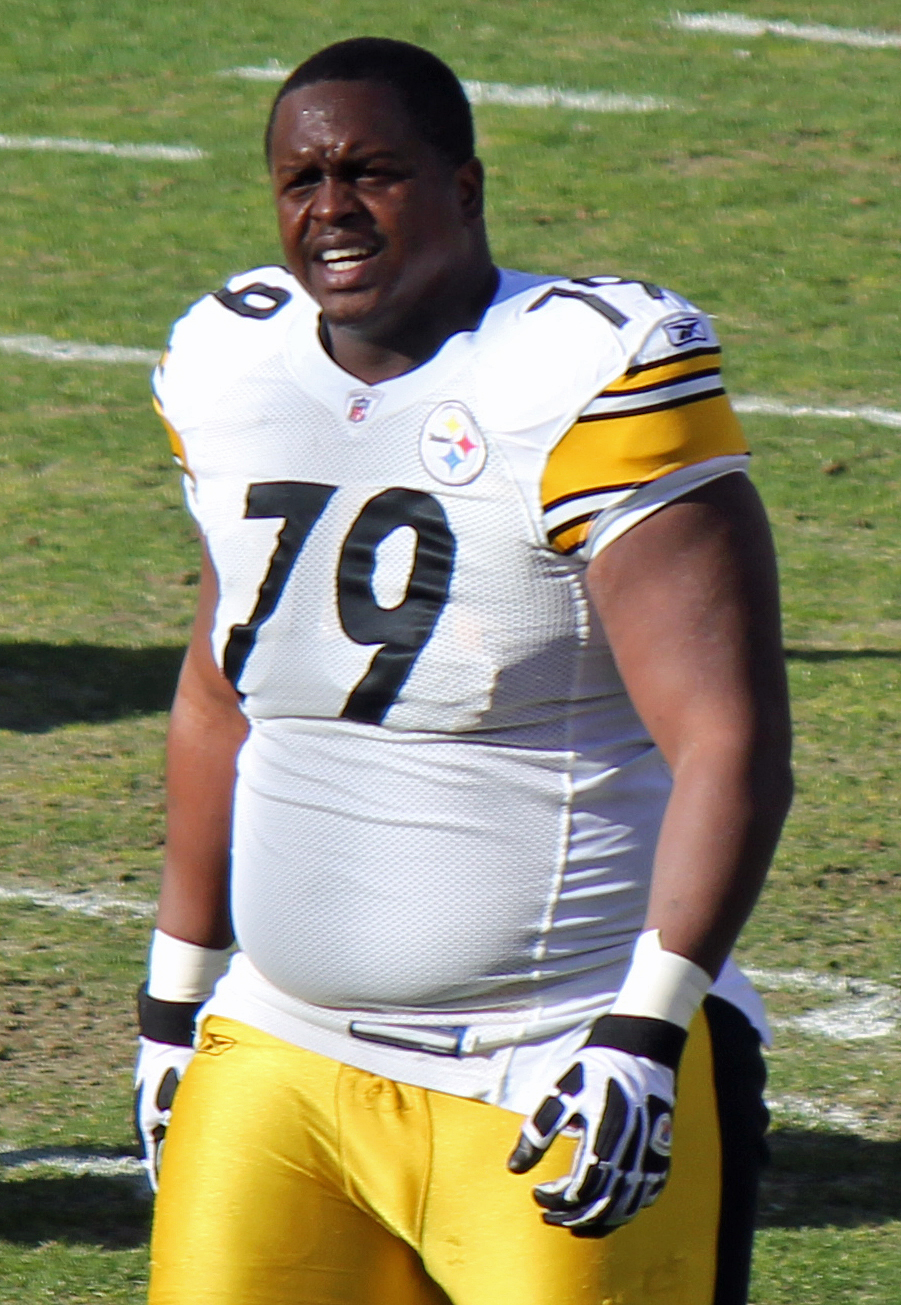
- Essex with the Pittsburgh Steelers in 2012

No. 66, 79
- Position: Offensive guard

Personal information
- Born: December 5, 1982 (age 43); Fort Wayne, Indiana, U.S.
- Listed height: 6 ft 5 in (1.96 m)
- Listed weight: 324 lb (147 kg)

Career information
- High school: Paul Harding (Fort Wayne)
- College: Northwestern
- NFL draft: 2005: 3rd round, 93rd overall pick

Career history
- Pittsburgh Steelers (2005–2011); Indianapolis Colts (2012)

Awards and highlights
- 2× Super Bowl champion (XL, XLIII)

Career NFL statistics
- Games played: 77
- Games started: 28
- Fumble recoveries: 1
- Stats at Pro Football Reference

Trai Jamar Essex (born December 5, 1982) is an American former professional football player who was an offensive guard for eight seasons in the National Football League (NFL) with the Pittsburgh Steelers and Indianapolis Colts. He played college football for the Northwestern Wildcats.

== Early life ==
Essex grew up in Fort Wayne, Indiana where he attended Paul Harding High School and lettered in football and basketball. In football, he was a standout tight end. He played in the first ever U.S. Army All-American Bowl (a high school football national all-star game) on December 30, 2000.

In basketball, he was a member of the 2001 class 2A Indiana boys high school championship team. His 14 rebounds ties for 3rd best ever in the class 2A championship game. Essex was an All-Conference honoree as a junior.

== College career ==
Essex attended Northwestern University, where he majored in African-American studies and was a letterman in football. He started every game as a true freshman at tight end, catching three passes for 24 yards and a touchdown. He was named to the Big Ten All-Freshman team by The Sporting News magazine. He was moved from tight end to offensive tackle prior to his sophomore season and started 37 consecutive games at left tackle for the Wildcats in his final three seasons. He was named to ESPN's All-Bowl team following his performance in the 2003 Motor City Bowl.

== Professional career ==
Pre-draft measurables
Height	Weight	40-yard dash	10-yard split	20-yard split	20-yard shuttle	Three-cone drill	Vertical jump	Broad jump	Bench press
6 ft 4 1/2 in (1.94 m)	324 lb (147 kg)	5.46 s	1.95 s	3.24 s	4.92 s	7.66 s	29.0 in (0.74 m)	8 ft 2 in (2.49 m)	22 reps
All values from NFL Combine

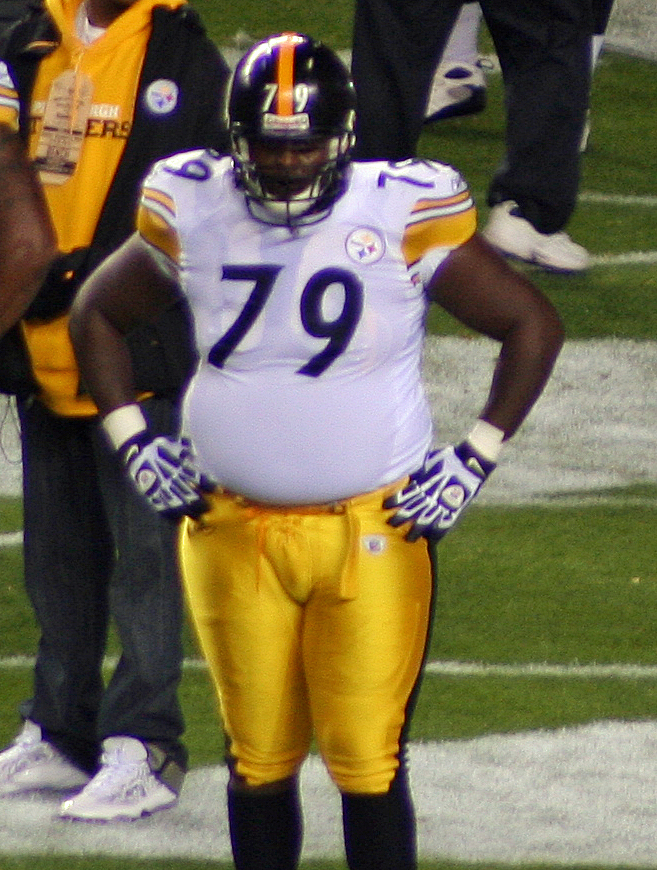
Essex during the 2009 NFL season.

Essex was selected in the third round of the 2005 NFL draft by the Pittsburgh Steelers. He signed a $1.385 million three-year contract which included a $460,000 signing bonus. After being held out of action through the first nine games of his rookie season, he started at left tackle in four games in place of an injured Marvel Smith. The Steelers' 2005 season ended with a victory in Super Bowl XL.

Essex did not make a start in the next two seasons, though he did suit up for 18 games. After the 2007 season he signed a restricted free agent tender which bound him to the team through 2008 for just over $900,000.

Essex's fifth career start came when he again subbed for Smith at left tackle in a playoff game on January 5, 2008, which was a narrow loss to the Jacksonville Jaguars.

Essex showed promise in 2008 with strong performances in place of starting right guard Darnell Stapleton against the Chicago Bears and Minnesota Vikings. Once again the team finished the season as Super Bowl champions, making Essex one of 21 players who were members of both of the Steelers' championship teams in the 2000s.

Following the Steelers' victory in Super Bowl XLIII, Essex signed a $1.92 million, two-year contract with the team, which included a $500,000 signing bonus. Before re-signing with Pittsburgh he fielded offers from the New York Jets and Tennessee Titans but was persuaded to return to the Steelers when he received assurances from the team that he would be given the opportunity to win a starting spot.

Essex started at right guard for the entire 2009 season. He picked up where he left off in 2010 as the starting right guard. However, he was sidelined in the second game of the year with a high-ankle sprain. He eventually returned as the starter at right guard, but was replaced by Ramon Foster after getting three more starts. The Steelers once again earned a trip to the Super Bowl XLV where they fell to the Green Bay Packers.

Essex was an unrestricted free agent following the 2010 NFL season. He was unable to sign a new contract due to the 2011 NFL lockout which canceled normal off-season team activities. During the lockout, Essex ballooned to 380 pounds, fifty pounds over his playing weight. Team personnel saw Essex at quarterback Ben Roethlisberger's wedding in July 2011, and were hesitant to extend a contract or invite Essex to training camp due to his lack of conditioning. The team eventually re-signed him toward the end of camp at Roethlisberger's urging after Essex had worked on his own to bring his weight under control. He said at the time that he had lost an amount equivalent to the weight of "a couple newborn babies." He was signed for the veteran minimum of $810,000.

Essex's "position flexibility" (i.e. the ability to play more than one role on the team) was key to his re-signing and was pressed to new heights in the 2011 season during which he played at all five offensive line positions. He played a good portion of the team's third game at right tackle when the starter, rookie Marcus Gilbert, was injured. He started the team's next game at left tackle in place of Jonathan Scott, who had also been injured in week three. He spent some time over the next few weeks at left guard because of yet more injuries. In week 13 he spent significant time at left guard and started at that position in week 15.

When backup center Doug Legursky (who was starting due to an injury to Maurkice Pouncey) was injured early in the team's week 16 game against the St. Louis Rams Essex was forced to play center for the first time in his career. The Steelers shut out the Rams 27–0 in that game and coach Mike Tomlin presented Essex with a game ball as recognition of the magnitude of his contributions.

Essex was released by the Steelers at the end of the 2012 training camp.
