= Jefferson Township, Allen County, Indiana =

Jefferson Township
- Township
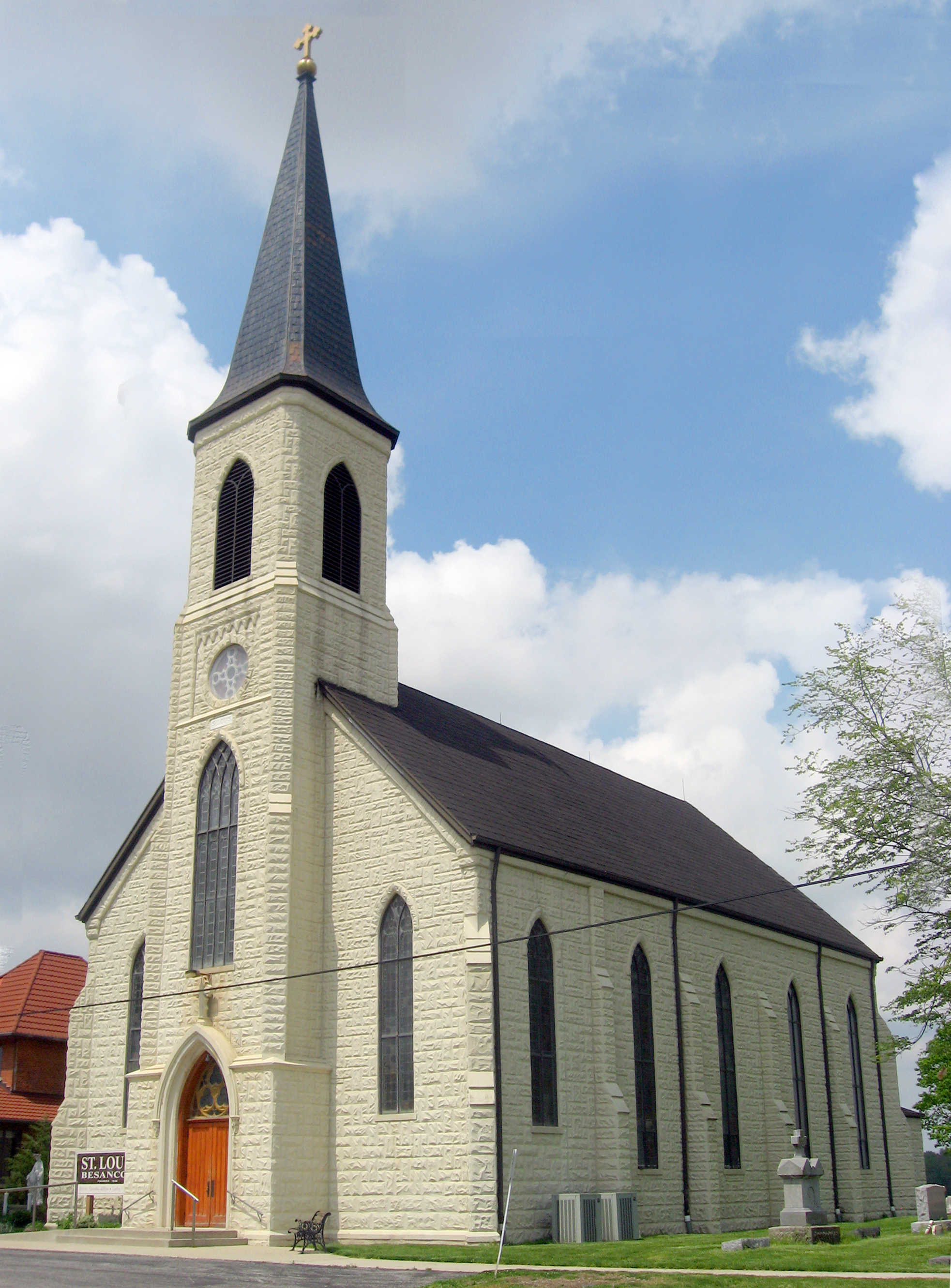
- St. Louis' Catholic Church, a historic site east of New Haven

- Location in Allen County, Indiana
- Coordinates: 41°03′02″N 84°56′28″W
- Country: United States
- State: Indiana
- County: Allen

Government
  - Type: Indiana township

Area
  - Total: 36.52 sq mi (94.59 km^{2})
  - Land: 36.51 sq mi (94.56 km^{2})
  - Water: 0.012 sq mi (0.03 km^{2}) 0.03%
- Elevation: 778 ft (237 m)

Population (2020)
  - Total: 2,037
  - Density: 58/sq mi (22.3/km^{2})
- ZIP codes: 46773, 46774, 46797, 46816
- GNIS feature ID: 0453478

Jefferson Township is one of twenty townships in Allen County, Indiana, United States. As of the 2010 census, its population was 2,109. Jefferson Township was organized in 1840.

== History ==
The Craigville Depot, New York Chicago and St. Louis Railroad Steam Locomotive No. 765, and St. Louis, Besancon, Historic District are listed on the National Register of Historic Places.

== Geography ==
According to the United States Census Bureau, Jefferson Township covers an area of 36.52 square miles (94.59 km^{2}); of this, 36.51 square miles (94.56 km^{2}) is land and 0.012 square miles (0.03 km^{2}), or 0.03 percent, is water.

=== Cities, towns, villages ===
- New Haven (east edge)

=== Unincorporated towns ===
- Maples at 41.012826°N 84.969133°W
- Tillman at 41.024215°N 84.893298°W
- Zulu at 41.036993°N 84.892187°W

(This list is based on USGS data and may include former settlements.)

=== Adjacent townships ===
- Milan Township (north)
- Maumee Township (northeast)
- Jackson Township (east)
- Monroe Township (southeast)
- Madison Township (south)
- Marion Township (southwest)
- Adams Township (west)
- St. Joseph Township (northwest)

Four Presidents Corners, a monument, was built in 1917 where Jefferson Township meets with Monroe, Madison, and Jackson townships. All four townships are named after presidents.

=== Cemeteries ===
The township contains Emmanuel Cemetery.

=== Major highways ===
- I-469
- US 24
- US 30
- SR 930

=== Airports and landing strips ===
- Casad Industrial Park Airport
- Klines Airport

== School districts ==
- East Allen County Schools

== Political districts ==
- Indiana's 3rd congressional district
- Indiana's 3rd congressional district
- State House District 79
- State House District 85
- State Senate District 14
