= Monroe Township, Allen County, Indiana =

Monroe Township
- Township
- Location in Allen County, Indiana
- Coordinates: 40°57′59″N 84°50′39″W
- Country: United States
- State: Indiana
- County: Allen

Government
  - Type: Indiana township

Area
  - Total: 24.73 sq mi (64.06 km^{2})
  - Land: 24.73 sq mi (64.06 km^{2})
  - Water: 0 sq mi (0 km^{2}) 0%
- Elevation: 771 ft (235 m)

Population (2020)
  - Total: 1,960
  - Density: 78/sq mi (30.1/km^{2})
- ZIP code: 46773
- GNIS feature ID: 0453634

Monroe Township is one of twenty townships in Allen County, Indiana, United States. At the 2010 census, the population was 1,927.

== Geography ==
According to the United States Census Bureau, Monroe Township covers an area of 24.73 square miles (64.06 km^{2}), all land.

=== Cities, towns, villages ===
- Monroeville

=== Unincorporated towns ===
- East Liberty at 40.935604°N 84.861631°W

(This list is based on USGS data and may include former settlements.)

=== Adjacent townships ===
- Jackson Township (north)
- Benton Township, Paulding County, Ohio (northeast)
- Tully Township, Van Wert County, Ohio (east)
- Union Township, Adams County (south)
- Root Township, Adams County (southwest)
- Madison Township (west)
- Jefferson Township (northwest)

Four Presidents Corners, a monument, was built in 1917 where Monroe Township meets with Jackson, Madison, and Jefferson townships. All four townships are named after presidents.

=== Cemeteries ===
The township contains these four cemeteries: Brown, Hoffman, Odd Fellows and Sugar Ridge.

=== Major highways ===
- US 30
- SR 101

== School districts ==
- East Allen County Schools

== Political districts ==
- Indiana's 3rd congressional district
- State House District 79
- State Senate District 14
