= Jackson Township, Allen County, Indiana =

Jackson Township
- Township
- Location in Allen County, Indiana
- Coordinates: 41°03′18″N 84°50′18″W
- Country: United States
- State: Indiana
- County: Allen

Government
  - Type: Indiana township

Area
  - Total: 25.49 sq mi (66.03 km^{2})
  - Land: 25.49 sq mi (66.03 km^{2})
  - Water: 0 sq mi (0 km^{2}) 0%
- Elevation: 761 ft (232 m)

Population (2020)
  - Total: 523
  - Density: 20/sq mi (7.6/km^{2})
- ZIP codes: 46773, 46797
- GNIS feature ID: 0453429

Jackson Township is one of twenty townships in Allen County, Indiana, United States. As of the 2010 census, its population was 504.

== Geography ==
According to the United States Census Bureau, Jackson Township covers an area of 25.49 square miles (66.03 km^{2}), all land.

=== Unincorporated towns ===
- Edgerton at 41.076716°N 84.806073°W
- Townley at 41.018104°N 84.863853°W

(This list is based on USGS data and may include former settlements.)

=== Adjacent townships ===
- Maumee Township (north)
- Harrison Township, Paulding County, Ohio (northeast)
- Benton Township, Paulding County, Ohio (east)
- Monroe Township (south)
- Madison Township (southwest)
- Jefferson Township (west)
- Milan Township (northwest)

Four Presidents Corners, a monument, was built in 1917 where Jackson Township meets with Monroe, Madison, and Jefferson townships. All four townships are named after presidents.

=== Major highways ===
- US 30
- SR 101

== School districts ==
- East Allen County Schools

== Political districts ==
- Indiana's 6th congressional district
- State House District 79
- State Senate District 14
