= Woodlan Junior/Senior High School =

Location
- 17215 Woodburn Road; Woodburn, Allen County, Indiana 46797; United States; 41.123594°N 84.918432°W

Information
- Type: Public high school
- Established: 1959
- Status: Open
- School district: East Allen County Schools
- Superintendent: Marilyn S. Hissong
- Principal: Dennis Kern
- Faculty: 49.53 (on an FTE basis)
- Grades: 7-12
- Enrollment: 743 (2024–25)
- Student to teacher ratio: 15.00
- Colors: Blue and white
- Team name: Warriors
- Website: Official Website

Woodlan Junior/Senior High School is a public high school located in unincorporated Allen County, Indiana, near Woodburn, a city close to Fort Wayne. It is a part of East Allen County Schools (EACS).

In addition to Woodburn, Harlan, and a small section of New Haven are within the school's attendance zone.

== History ==
Woodlan was built cooperatively between the Milan Township and Maumee Township school districts for the 1959–1960 school year. The name Woodlan was a combination of Maumee township where Woodburn (Wood) is located and Milan township (lan) to create the name Woodlan. Harlan High School consolidated into Woodlan in 1965.

== Athletics ==
- Boys JV Baseball
- Boys Varsity Baseball
- Boys Junior High Grade Basketball
- Boys Freshmen Basketball
- Boys JV Basketball
- Boys Varsity Basketball
- Girls Junior High Grade Basketball
- Girls Freshmen Basketball
- Girls JV Basketball
- Girls Varsity Basketball
- Junior High Cross Country
- High School Cross Country
- Junior High Football
- JV Football
- Varsity Football
- Girls Golf
- Boys Golf
- Junior High Boys Soccer
- Varsity Boys Soccer
- Junior High Girls Soccer
- Varsity Girls Soccer
- Girls JV Softball
- Girls Varsity Softball
- Junior High CO-ED Track & Field
- Boys Track & Field
- Girls Track & Field
- Unified Bowling
- Boys JV Volleyball
- Boys Varsity Volleyball
- Junior High Girls Volleyball
- Freshmen Girls Volleyball
- Varsity Girls Volleyball
- Junior High Boys Wrestling
- Varsity Boys Wrestling

== Clubs/Activities ==
- Woodlan FFA
- Student Council
- National Honor Society
- Service Club
- Student Athletic Council
- Dungeons and Dragons Club
- Junior High Robotics Club
- Jazz Band
- Pep Band
- Winter Guard
- Spirit Of Woodlan - Marching Band

== See also ==
- List of high schools in Indiana
- Allen County Athletic Conference
- East Allen County Schools
- Woodburn, Indiana
