= East Allen County Schools =

Public school district in Indiana

East Allen County Schools (EACS)
- 1240 State Road 930 East New Haven, Allen County, IN, 46774

District information
- Type: Public
- Motto: Dream it. Do it.
- Grades: PK–12
- Superintendent: Marilyn S. Hissong
- Budget: $161,459,313 (2024)

Students and staff
- Students: 10,090 (2022-23)
- Teachers: 614.99 (2022-23)
- Staff: 675.50 (2022-23)

Other information
- 2023 Graduation Rate: 88%
- 2023 Graduates: 739
- Website: Official website

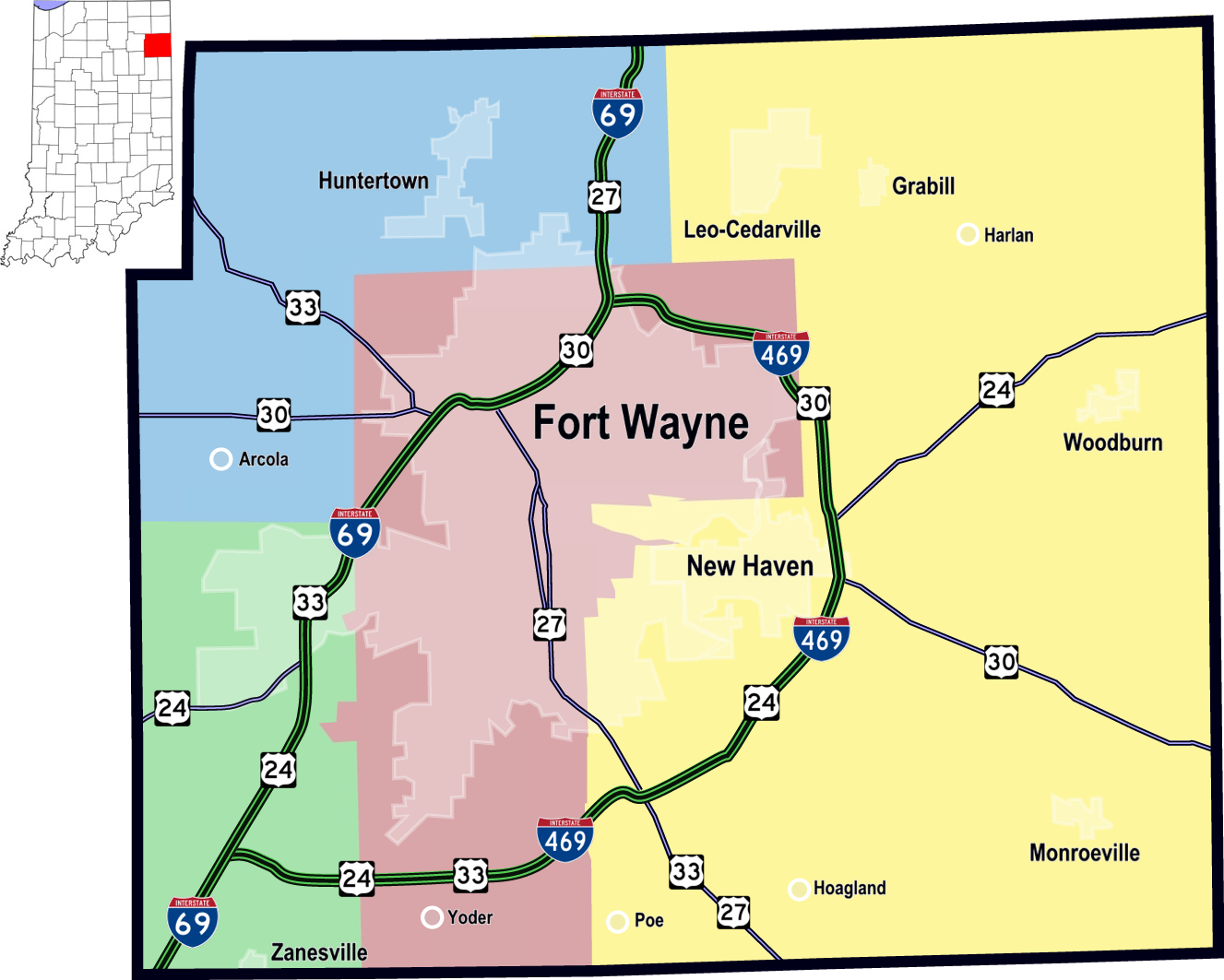
The yellow-shaded area depicts the area in Allen County that includes the East Allen County Schools district. Blue is Northwest Allen County Schools; brown/purple Fort Wayne Community Schools; green Southwest Allen County Schools

Location of Indiana within the United States

The East Allen County School (EACS) corporation is an Allen County area public school district, one of the largest in area in Indiana, encompassing southeast Fort Wayne, all of Leo-Cedarville, Monroeville, New Haven, and Woodburn. It operates six secondary schools and eight elementary schools. EACS's current superintendent is Marilyn S. Hissong.

The district was created in the mid-1960s as a combination of 10 smaller, township school districts.

== Boundary ==
Its boundary includes the following townships: Cedar Creek, Jackson, Jefferson, Madison, Marion, Maumee, Milan, Monroe, Scipio, Springfield, and Adams (majority).

The district includes the municipalities of Grabill, Leo-Cedarville, Monroeville, New Haven, and Woodburn, along with portions of Fort Wayne. It also includes the census-designated places of Harlan and Hoagland. The unincorporated area of Poe is also in this district.

== Secondary schools ==
- Heritage Junior/Senior High School
- Leo Junior/Senior High School
- New Haven High School
- Paul Harding Junior High School
- Woodlan Junior/Senior High School

New Haven Middle School was its own building until 2019, when grades were reconfigured, with a junior high school attached to New Haven High School.

Additionally East Allen University is a dual-credit high school program.

== Elementary schools ==
- Cedarville Elementary
- Heritage Elementary
- Leo Elementary
- New Haven Intermediate School
- New Haven Primary School
- Prince Chapman Academy
- Southwick Elementary
- Woodlan Elementary

== Superintendents of East Allen County Schools ==
Period	Duration	Name
July 2017 -		Marilyn S. Hissong
June 2017 - July 2017	4 days	Douglas Hicks
August 2013 - June 2017	3 yrs, 10 mos	Dr. Kenneth Folks
July 2009 - February 2013	3 yrs, 8 mos	Dr. Karyle Green
March 2006 - June 2009, September 2005 - February 2006 (interim), July 2005 - August 2005 (acting)	3 yrs, 4 mos, 6 mos, 2 mos	Dr. M. Kay Novotny
July 1996 - June 2005	9 yrs	Dr. Jeff Abbott
February 1991 - June 1996	5 yrs, 5 mos	Dr. James R. Gland
July 1990 - January 1991 (interim)	7 mos	Dr. Thomas G. Grabill
July 1982 - June 1990	8 yrs	Dr. Michael P. Benway
July 1973 - June 1982	9 yrs	Dr. Daryl R. Yost
April 1969 - June 1973	4 yrs, 3 mos	Dr. Richard Miller
July 1968 - March 1969 (interim)	9 mos	Dr. Robert Holt
1964 (Inception)- June 1968	4 yrs	Dr. Paul Harding

== See also ==
- List of school districts in Indiana
