= Lydia Allen DeVilbiss =

American physician (1882–1964)

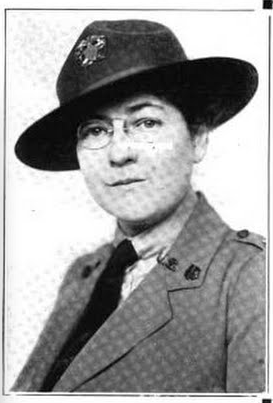
- DeVilbiss in uniform as a member of the United States Public Health Service, 1922
- Born: September 3, 1882; Hoagland, Indiana, U.S.
- Died: December 5, 1964 (aged 82); Sarasota, Florida, U.S.
- Citizenship: United States
- Education: Indiana Medical College (MD)
- Occupation: Public health surgeon
- Employer: United States Public Health Service
- Known for: Eugenics, birth control
- Spouse(s): Albert K. Shauck (m. 1906–c. 1913; divorced); George Henry Bradford (m. 1920–1945; his death)

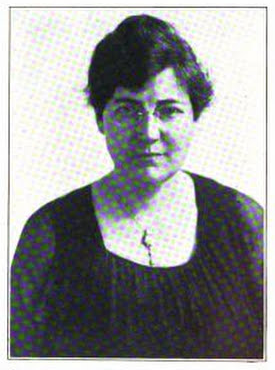
Lydia Allen DeVilbiss, from a 1922 publication.

Lydia Allen DeVilbiss (1882–1964) was an American physician, and author. She wrote on topics such as birth control, public health, and eugenics.

== Early life ==
Lydia Allen DeVilbiss was born in Hoagland, Indiana, one of seven children born to William Fletcher DeVilbiss and Naomi Ridenour DeVilbiss.

She received a medical degree at the Indiana Medical College in 1907. She did her postgraduate school at the University of Pennsylvania.

== Career ==
=== Public health, birth control and eugenics ===
DeVilbiss was a "surgeon reserve" with the United States Public Health Service, the first woman appointed by the Surgeon General to work on child hygiene; she also wrote reports on child welfare. During World War I she worked on establishing quarantine guidelines and procedures for preventing sexually-transmitted disease.

She served as medical director of the "Better Babies" Department at the magazine Woman's Home Companion. DeVilbiss was head of child health at the New York Board of Health, where she made public pronouncements on healthful dress (for example, "Nature knows whether you are well dressed, whether you know it or not").

In 1915, she was appointed head of child hygiene for the Kansas State Board of Health. There, she created the Kansas Mother's Book, a popular publication that went through several editions. She also brought the Little Mothers League education program to Kansas from New York. She worked in public health in Kansas during the 1918 flu pandemic, during which she recommended people refrain from handshakes to prevent spreading the virus.

She was the author of the book Birth Control: What Is It? (1923). She also lectured on the Chautauqua circuit and wrote articles on the subject for journals such as Birth Control Review Public Health Reports, and the American Journal of Obstetrics and Gynecology. She had a contentious professional relationship with editor and fellow birth control advocate Margaret Sanger.

In 1928, DeVilbiss opened a maternal health clinic in Miami, Florida. There, she advised women on family planning and ran clinical trials on sponge-based methods of birth control; she also performed surgical sterilizations on the mothers (often black women) that she deemed too undisciplined or uneducated to manage other measures.

She briefly worked with local African-American groups to create a branch clinic for black women in Miami, but withdrew funding over disagreements. She was the founder and president of the Miami Mothers Health Club.

In 1944, she was credited with suggesting educational booklets for pregnant military wives during World War II. In 1959, she wrote an article for the American Mercury magazine arguing for premarital blood tests to prevent the genetic transmission of sickle cell anemia, and discouraging the use of black donors' blood in white patients.

=== Suffrage and clubwork ===
DeVilbiss was president of several organizations, including the Shelby Equal Franchise Association, her county's Woman's Suffrage Association, and her local Anti-Tuberculosis Society. She was also an officer of the Shelby Medical Society, and a member of the Shelby Socialist organization. In 1915, she spoke to the Topeka Federation of Women's Clubs about unhealthy conditions at the county's poor farm.

== Personal life ==
DeVilbiss married Albert K. Shauck in 1906. They lived in Fort Wayne, Indiana. She sued for divorce in 1912, with accusations of cruelty on both sides; the divorce suit was dropped in 1913, but they did eventually end the marriage before she married again in 1920, to a fellow doctor, George Henry Bradford. Widowed in 1945, she died in Sarasota, Florida, in 1964, aged 82.
