= Adams Township, Allen County, Indiana =

Township in Indiana, United States

Adams Township
- Township
- Seal

- Location in Allen County, Indiana
- Coordinates: 41°02′45″N 85°03′02″W
- Country: United States
- State: Indiana
- County: Allen

Government
  - Type: Indiana township

Area
  - Total: 32.76 sq mi (84.85 km^{2})
  - Land: 32.75 sq mi (84.81 km^{2})
  - Water: 0.015 sq mi (0.04 km^{2}) 0.05%
- Elevation: 784 ft (239 m)

Population (2020)
  - Total: 34,192
  - Density: 972/sq mi (375.1/km^{2})
- Time zone: UTC-5 (Eastern (EST))
  - Summer (DST): UTC-4 (EDT)
- ZIP codes: 46774, 46803, 46805, 46806, 46815, 46816
- Area code: 260
- GNIS feature ID: 453073
- Website: www.adamstownship.org

Adams Township is one of twenty townships in Allen County, Indiana, United States. As of the 2010 census, its population was 31,816.

== Geography ==
According to the United States Census Bureau, Adams Township covers an area of 32.76 square miles (84.85 km^{2}); of this, 32.75 square miles (84.81 km^{2}) is land and 0.015 square miles (0.04 km^{2}), or 0.05 percent, is water.

=== Cities and towns ===
- Fort Wayne (southeast portion)
- New Haven (majority of city)

=== Unincorporated towns ===
- Eastland Gardens at 41.019770°N 85.100247°W
- River Haven at 41.077549°N 85.054136°W
- Sunnymede Woods at 41.065326°N 85.066080°W
- Tanglewood at 41.073382°N 85.004412°W

=== Neighborhoods ===
- Anthony Wayne Village at 41.039493°N 85.105525°W
- Fairfax at 41.041993°N 85.088303°W
- Meadowbrook at 41.060326°N 85.039135°W

(This list is based on USGS data and may include former settlements.)

=== Adjacent townships ===
- St. Joseph Township (north)
- Milan Township (northeast)
- Jefferson Township (east)
- Madison Township (southeast)
- Marion Township (south)
- Pleasant Township (southwest)
- Wayne Township (west)

=== Major highways ===
- I-469 (Ronald Reagan Expressway)
- US 24
- US 27
- US 30
- SR 930

=== Cemeteries ===
The township contains these two cemeteries: Concordia Gardens and Saint John.

== School districts ==
- East Allen County Schools

== Political districts ==
- Indiana's 3rd congressional district
- State House District 79
- State House District 80
- State House District 81
- State House District 84
- State House District 85
- State Senate District 14
- State Senate District 15
