= Madison Township, Allen County, Indiana =

Madison Township
- Township
- Seal

- Location in Allen County, Indiana
- Coordinates: 40°57′33″N 84°56′28″W
- Country: United States
- State: Indiana
- County: Allen

Government
  - Type: Indiana township

Area
  - Total: 36.58 sq mi (94.75 km^{2})
  - Land: 36.58 sq mi (94.75 km^{2})
  - Water: 0 sq mi (0 km^{2}) 0%
- Elevation: 807 ft (246 m)

Population (2020)
  - Total: 1,659
  - Density: 48/sq mi (18.7/km^{2})
- ZIP codes: 46733, 46745, 46773, 46816
- GNIS feature ID: 0453587
- Website: www.in.gov/townships/madison2/

Madison Township is one of twenty townships in Allen County, Indiana, United States. As of the 2020 census, its population was 1,659.

== Geography ==
According to the United States Census Bureau, Madison Township covers an area of 36.58 square miles (94.75 km^{2}).

=== Unincorporated towns ===
- Boston Corner at 40.948381°N 84.900243°W
- Hoagland at 40.947826°N 84.991634°W

(This list is based on USGS data and may include former settlements.)

=== Adjacent townships ===
- Jefferson Township (north)
- Jackson Township (northeast)
- Monroe Township (east)
- Union Township, Adams County (southeast)
- Root Township, Adams County (south)
- Preble Township, Adams County (southwest)
- Marion Township (west)
- Adams Township (northwest)

Four Presidents Corners, a monument, was built in 1917 where Madison Township meets with Monroe, Jackson, and Jefferson townships. All four townships are named after presidents.

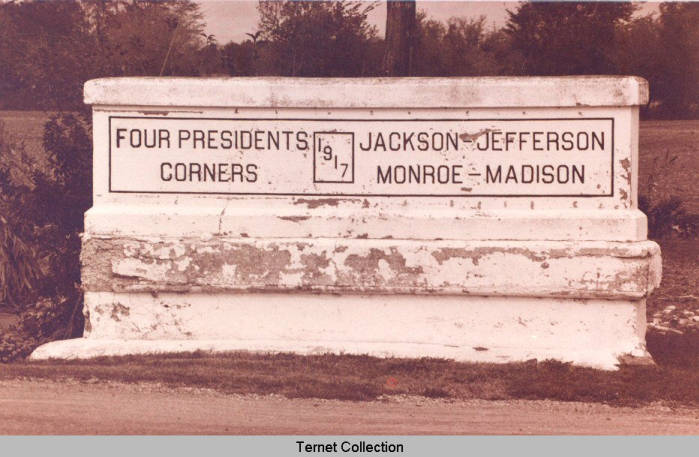
Monument

=== Cemeteries ===
The township contains Massilon Cemetery and Pleasant Valley Cemetery.

=== Airports and landing strips ===
- Valhalla Airport

== School districts ==
- East Allen County Schools

== Political districts ==
- Indiana's 3rd congressional district
- State House District 79
- State Senate District 14
