= Heritage Junior/Senior High School =

Location
- 13608 Monroeville Road; Monroeville, Indiana 46773; United States; 40°58′36″N 84°57′43″W

Information
- School district: East Allen County Schools
- CEEB code: 152375
- Principal: Rebecca Christensen
- Teaching staff: 53.20 (on a FTE basis)
- Grades: 7-12
- Enrollment: 748 (2024–2025)
- Student to teacher ratio: 14.06
- Colors: Red, blue, and white
- Athletics: IHSAA AAA
- Athletics conference: Allen County Athletic Conference
- Nickname: Patriots
- Newspaper: The Structure
- Website: hhs.eacs.k12.in.us

Heritage Jr.-Sr. High School is a secondary school in unincorporated Allen County, Indiana, with a Monroeville address. One of five secondary schools in the East Allen County Schools system, Heritage serves students in grades 7–12 in the communities of: Hoagland, Monroeville, and Poe. A small portion of the New Haven city limits coincides with this school's attendance zone.

== History ==
Heritage High School was created by the consolidation of Hoagland and Monroeville High Schools It opened for the 1968/1969 school year.

Prior to 1995 there had been proposals to close Heritage High School and consolidate EACS schools for racial balance reasons. Monroeville-area residents by then were generally not willing to move to a different high school.

== Demographics ==
In 1995 the school had 718 students, with 39 being of races other than non-Hispanic white.

== Demographics ==
The demographic breakdown of the 804 students enrolled in 2014-15 was:

- Male - 49.9%
- Female - 50.1%
- Black - 25%
- Hispanic - 20%
- White - 30%
- Asian - 25%

100% of the students are eligible for free lunch

== Athletics ==
The school's teams, known as the Heritage Patriots, compete in the Indiana High School Athletic Association's AAA size classification in the Allen County Athletic Conference. Teams are fielded in baseball, basketball, football, golf, gymnastics, soccer, softball, track and field, volleyball, and wrestling.

State championship titles held by the school's teams include:

- Girls' basketball: 1981-82

== Notable alumni ==
- Andrew Saalfrank, baseball player

== See also ==
- List of high schools in Indiana
