= Craigville station =

- Craigville Depot
- Formerly listed on the U.S. National Register of Historic Places
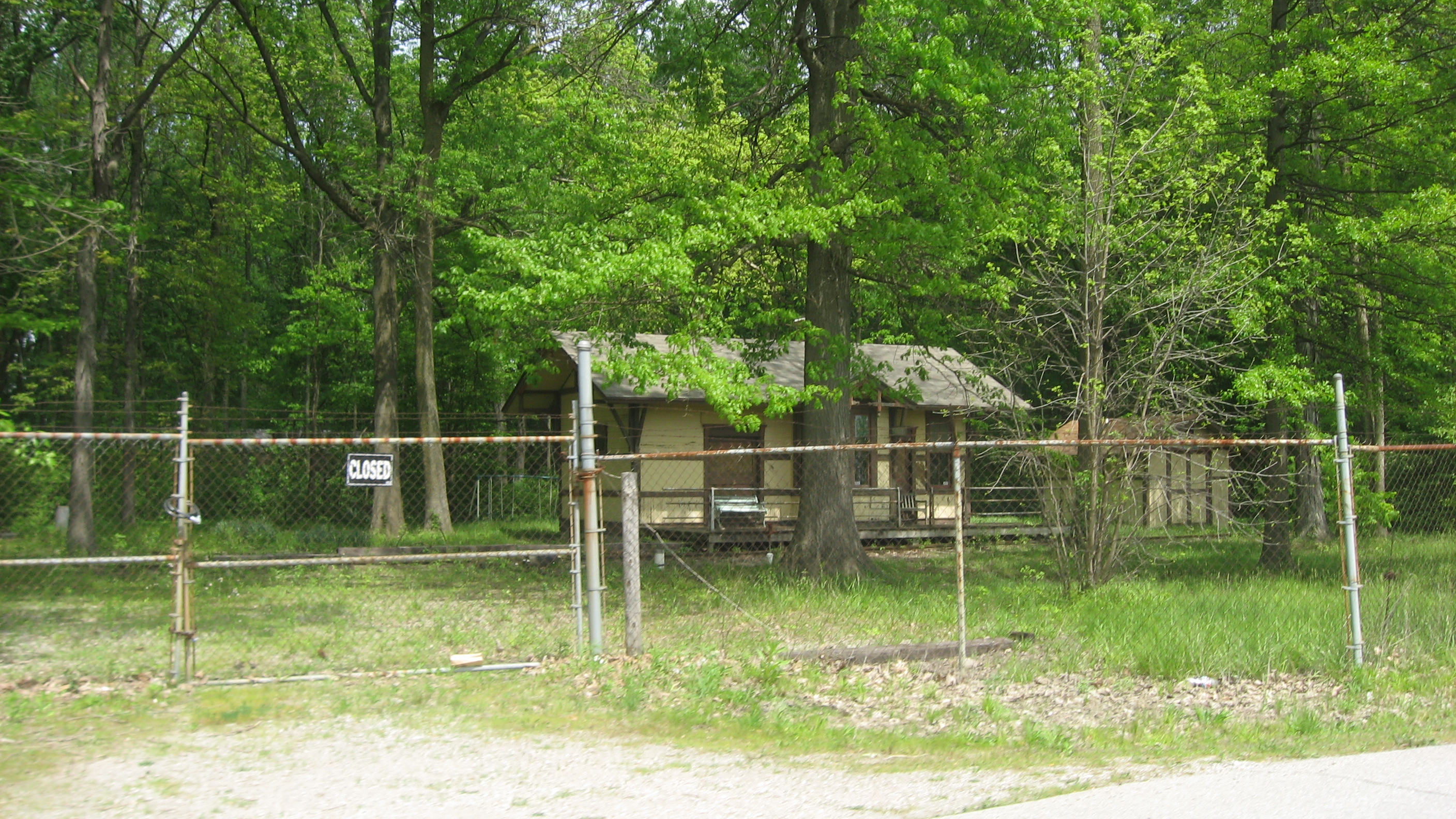
- Craigville Depot, May 2012

- Location within Indiana Location within the United States
- Location: Ryan and Edgerton Rds., east of New Haven, Jefferson Township, Allen County, Indiana
- Coordinates: 41°4′45″N 84°57′42″W
- Area: less than one acre
- Built: 1879
- Architectural style: Stick/eastlake
- NRHP reference No.: 84000181

Significant dates
- Added to NRHP: October 10, 1984
- Removed from NRHP: September 22, 2023

Craigville Depot is a historic train station located in Jefferson Township, Allen County, Indiana, USA. It was built in 1879 and is a one-story, wood-frame building, measuring 16 feet wide, 32 feet long and 16 feet 6 inches high. The gable roof has a four-foot overhang and elaborate Stick Style / Eastlake movement ornamentation. The building was moved from its original location in 1950 and again in 1979. It was restored by Edward Byer who was the owner of the New Haven and Lake Erie Railroad.

It was added to the National Register of Historic Places in 1984, and was delisted in 2023.
