= Springfield Township, Allen County, Indiana =

Springfield Township
- Township
- Location of Springfield Township in Allen County, Indiana
- Coordinates: 41°13′39″N 84°54′30″W
- Country: United States
- State: Indiana
- County: Allen

Government
  - Type: Indiana township

Area
  - Total: 35.37 sq mi (91.60 km^{2})
  - Land: 35.30 sq mi (91.43 km^{2})
  - Water: 0.066 sq mi (0.17 km^{2})
- Elevation: 820 ft (250 m)

Population (2020)
  - Total: 4,541
  - Density: 123/sq mi (47.6/km^{2})
- FIPS code: 18-72116
- GNIS feature ID: 453864

Springfield Township is one of twenty townships in Allen County, Indiana, United States. As of the 2010 census, its population was 4,349. The principal town in Springfield Township is the village of Harlan.

== Geography ==
Springfield Township covers an area of 35.37 square miles (91.60 km^{2}); 0.066 square miles (0.17 km^{2}), or 0.19 percent of this is water.

=== Unincorporated towns ===
- Cuba
- Harlan

(This list is based on USGS data and may include former settlements.)

=== Adjacent townships ===
The township is adjacent to these Indiana townships:

- Cedar Creek (west)
- Maumee (southeast)
- Milan (southwest)
- Scipio (east)
- Jackson Township, DeKalb County (northwest)
- Newville Township, DeKalb County (northeast)
- Spencer Township, DeKalb County (north)

=== Major highways ===
- SR 1
- SR 37
- SR 101
