= Paul Harding High School =

Location
- 6501 Wayne Trace; Fort Wayne, Allen County, Indiana 46816; United States; 41.02751°N 85.07587°W

Information
- Type: Public, Coeducational
- Established: 1973
- Founder: Paul Harding
- Status: Closed
- Closed: 2011
- School district: East Allen County Schools
- Superintendent: Marilyn Hissong
- President: East Allen County Schools
- Principal: Danielle Newman
- Grades: 7th–12th
- Student to teacher ratio: 16:1
- Hours in school day: 8
- Colors: Green, Gold and White
- Song: Notre Dame Victory March
- Athletics conference: Northeast Eight Conference
- Sports: Football, Basketball, Soccer, Cross Country, Track & Field
- Mascot: Hawks
- Team name: Hawks
- Accreditation: North Central Association of Colleges and Secondary Schools

Paul Harding High School was a High school located on the southeast side of Fort Wayne, Indiana, United States. Harding was a part of East Allen County Schools system located in Allen County, Indiana.

== Closure and Reorganization ==
On September 21, 2010, Superintendent Karyle Green presented a redesign plan at the meeting of the EACS school board. The plan was presented as a way for the school district to reduce expenses, respond to reduced student enrollment, and revise the academic opportunities provided to the students. As part of that plan, it was announced that Harding High School and seven elementary schools in the district would be closed at the end of the 2010–2011 school year. Non-graduating Harding students would be distributed among the four remaining district high schools for the fall of 2011. At the same time, the plan stated that Harding would be reopened as a magnet school, the Paul Harding College and Career Academy, serving the 7th and 8th grade students that currently attend the district's Prince Chapman Academy. Beginning with the 2012–2013 school year, an additional grade would be added yearly so that the student body will ultimately include grades 7–12.

On October 5, 2010, the school board approved the plan by a 6–1 vote, and June 10, 2011, saw Paul Harding High School close its doors as a district high school.

== Academic Challenges ==
In recent years, Harding struggled with test scores, graduation rates and other marks of academic achievement. At the time of its closing, the school was in its fifth year on state academic probation. Had the school not closed, it could have faced state intervention, including a possible takeover, if assessment scores did not improve.

== Historical background ==
In 1965, Ball State University conducted a study for the newly formed East Allen County School Corporation. The study was made to determine the present and future school building needs of the corporation.

The study team advised the school corporation that a new high school should be constructed in the southeast portion of property owned by the school corporation. On March 31, 1969, the board of school trustees commissioned the architectural firm of Schenkel & Shultz to begin plans for the construction of this high school.

A committee of teachers was formed to study the educational needs of the community and to develop a set of educational specifications to meet these educational needs. Dr. Merle Strom and Dr. Paul Nesper of Ball State University worked with the educational specifications committee to assist in development of plans for the new school. The educational specifications were turned over to the architect, and the new school building was designed to meet these specifications.

A school building corporation was formed in accordance with the statutes of the state of Indiana, to finance the construction of this new school. The building is constructed on a 97-acre (390,000 m^{2}) site on Wayne Trace, between Paulding Road and Tillman Road. It serves the student population in the southeast portion of Adams Township who are in grades 9 through 12.

The 247,335-square-foot (22,978.2 m^{2}) building was built with movable walls, which gave leaders the ability to create and remove classrooms to suit their needs. It cost the district about $6 million to build the school, which has undergone no significant renovations over the years.

Originally, Harding served 1,137 students. In its final year of operation, it served about 600. The school had its highest enrollment in 1974–75, when it reached 1,235.

The school is named after Paul Harding, the first superintendent of East Allen County Schools. Harding served as superintendent from 1964 until his death on August 7, 1968. Prior to that, Harding served for 10 years (1954–1964) as the superintendent of New Haven Schools.

== Academics ==
Paul Harding High School is a member of the North Central Association of Colleges and Secondary Schools and is commissioned as a First Class School by the Indiana Department of Public Instruction. Paul Harding High School is a four-year comprehensive high school offering academic, business, vocational, and general curricula. Students who want direct technical and vocational training are served at the Fort Wayne Anthis Career Center. The curriculum contains advanced and honors courses in English, math, physical education, foreign language, social studies, and science. Advanced Placement is offered in English 12 and Calculus with more to be added next year. There are also opportunities for students to be involved in Collegiate Connection to earn college credits while still attending high school. The district is currently investigating the possibility of dual credit courses to be offered in the school in the future. Each teacher has a copy of the curriculum they are teaching. The central office also has a copy of the curriculum for each department.

The student body is 10% Caucasian, 78% Black, and 12% other minorities. A pattern of mobility has been noted within the past five years of about 50% of the student population either enrolling or withdrawing during the school year. There are 63% of the students enrolled in the free/reduced lunch program for the 2007–08 school year.

The certified staff of Paul Harding High School consists of 40 classroom teachers, 3 counselors, 1 librarian, and 3 administrators. The teacher turnover rate has been average the last few years due to teacher retirement, district reductions and normal turnover.

There are 180 student days in the school year. The secondary day is from 8:00 A.M. to 3:10 P.M. The school day is run on the Trimester schedule. Students go to five periods each day, with the class periods being 75 minutes long. The majority of 9th grade students are involved in the Freshman Academy where they take Algebra I, English 9, PE, Health and Read 180. Students are able to take up to 15 credits in a school year.

== Athletics ==
All athletic teams compete in the Summit Athletic Conference. Paul Harding played in the first high school hockey game in Fort Wayne, in 1975, against cross town rival Bishop Dwenger. Dwenger won the game 6-3 and was played in front of nearly 5,000 people.

=== Team State Champions ===
- Boys' Basketball:
  - Class 2A - 2001
- Boys' Football:
  - Class 2A - 2006
- Girls' Track and Field:
  - 1995/96(Co-champions)
  - 1994/95

=== Individual State Champions ===
- Girls' Cross-Country:
  - 1981/82 Kristi Walker
- Boys' Track and Field:
  - 1984/85 Glenn Schneider - discus
  - 1983/84 Glenn Schneider - discus
  - 1974/75 George Doehla - discus
  - 1973/74 George Doehla - shot put
- Girls' Track and Field:
  - 1998/99 Rholonda Ash - 800 meter dash
  - 1995/96 LaShanda Harper - 100 meter dash, 200 meter dash, long jump
  - 1994/95 LaShanda Harper - 100 meter dash, 200 meter dash, long jump
  - 1993/94 LaShanda Harper - 100 meter dash, 200 meter dash, long jump
  - 1982/83 Terri Young - 400 meter dash
  - 1980/81 Kristi Walker - 1600 meter dash
  - 1979/80 Kristi Walker - 1600 meter dash
  - Relay Races:
    - 1995/96 400 meter relay (Kelly Walker, Ebony Jackson, Donishia Morrison, LaShanda Harper)
    - 1994/95 400 meter relay (Wilita McCarter, Ebony Jackson, LaShyra Harris, LaShanda Harper)
- Boys' Wrestling:
  - 1988/89 Troy Bahler - 130 lb (59 kg).
  - 2005/6 Jarrell Wattley (Semi-State Finalist) Broke Harding's Wrestling season record with 37 wins and 6 losses

== Notable faculty and alumni ==
=== Faculty ===
- Arnie Ball, men's volleyball coach, IPFW

=== Alumni ===
- Trai Essex (2001), professional football player, NFL Pittsburgh Steelers
- Selwyn Lymon (2005), professional football player, NFL
- Jim Master, Indiana Mr. Basketball (1980), high school All-American, University of Kentucky
- Rod Smith (2010), professional football player, NFL
