= Woodburn, Indiana =

- City
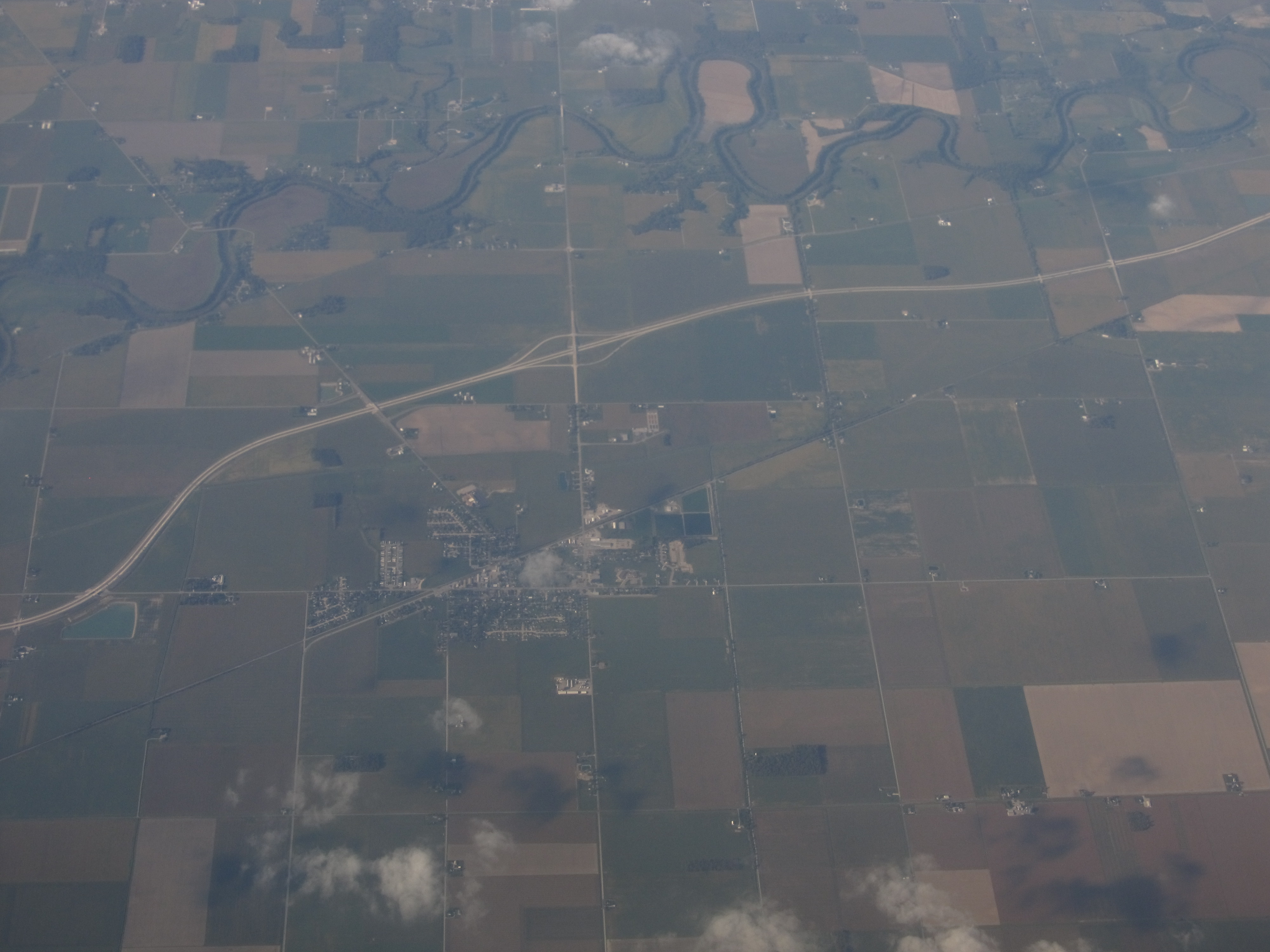
- Aerial photograph of Woodburn in 2012.

- Location of Woodburn in Allen County, Indiana.
- Coordinates: 41°07′27″N 84°51′17″W
- Country: United States
- State: Indiana
- County: Allen
- Township: Maumee
- Established: 1865
- Incorporated (town): 1895
- Incorporated (city): 1956

Government
  - Mayor: Joseph F. Kelsey (R)
  - Clerk-Treasurer: Kevin T. Hileman Sr. (R)

Area
  - Total: 0.96 sq mi (2.48 km^{2})
  - Land: 0.96 sq mi (2.48 km^{2})
  - Water: 0 sq mi (0.00 km^{2}) 0%
- Elevation: 751 ft (229 m)

Population (2020)
  - Total: 1,551
  - Density: 1,621.4/sq mi (626.03/km^{2})
- Time zone: UTC-5 (EST)
  - Summer (DST): UTC-4 (EDT)
- ZIP code: 46797
- Area code: 260
- FIPS code: 18-85184
- GNIS feature ID: 2397367
- Website: www.woodburn.in.gov

Woodburn is a city in Maumee Township, Allen County, Indiana, United States. The population was 1,551 at the 2020 census.

== History ==
In 1865 Joseph Edgerton and Joseph Smith platted the town of Woodburn, or Phelps Station as it was called at that time. The two men chose this area due to the abundant timber, fertile ground, and nearby river. After two large, accidental fires in the area Joseph Edgerton sent his son Edward Edgerton to Woodburn to sell off large tracts of land for farming.

This area was first known as Phelps Station due to the train depot. There were five families and a post office. In September 1865 the town was again platted with the name Woodburn due to the enormous wood burnings to clear the land. In 1895 a group of local men decided to incorporate the town into Shirley City in honor of Senator Robert B Shirley.

Once again in 1956 a special meeting was called where the decision was made to return the name to Woodburn and officially become the smallest 5th class city in Indiana. The hard working pioneers who migrated to this area are to be commended for clearing the land for cultivation and implementing the drainage system. This cleared the way for commerce in the city.

The Stucky brothers started their business in Woodburn selling farm implements and repair. The grain elevator and train station were the leading businesses in the early days. Soon the small city became self-contained with everything from a bank, to grocery stores, drug store, furniture, doctors, blacksmith, restaurants, taverns, stockyard, hotel, butcher shop, brick and tile mill, automobiles, schools and churches.

Due to limited roads and abundant local business, community members did not have to travel outside of Woodburn for their basic needs.

The area surrounding Woodburn was struck by an EF-3 tornado on August 24, 2016.

== Geography ==
According to the 2010 census, Woodburn has a total area of 0.93 square miles (2.41 km^{2}), all land.

Woodburn is located adjacent to U.S. Route 24.

== Demographics ==
Historical population
Census	Pop.	Note	%±
1900	236		—
1910	375		58.9%
1920	474		26.4%
1930	493		4.0%
1940	471		−4.5%
1950	540		14.6%
1960	585		8.3%
1970	688		17.6%
1980	1,002		45.6%
1990	1,321		31.8%
2000	1,579		19.5%
2010	1,520		−3.7%
2020	1,551		2.0%
U.S. Decennial Census

=== 2020 census ===
As of the 2020 census, Woodburn had a population of 1,551. The median age was 36.9 years. 26.7% of residents were under the age of 18 and 14.4% of residents were 65 years of age or older. For every 100 females there were 97.6 males, and for every 100 females age 18 and over there were 93.4 males age 18 and over.

0.0% of residents lived in urban areas, while 100.0% lived in rural areas.

There were 618 households in Woodburn, of which 34.5% had children under the age of 18 living in them. Of all households, 46.6% were married-couple households, 17.6% were households with a male householder and no spouse or partner present, and 26.5% were households with a female householder and no spouse or partner present. About 27.4% of all households were made up of individuals and 12.6% had someone living alone who was 65 years of age or older.

There were 672 housing units, of which 8.0% were vacant. The homeowner vacancy rate was 0.6% and the rental vacancy rate was 17.0%.

Racial composition as of the 2020 census
Race	Number	Percent
White	1,437	92.6%
Black or African American	9	0.6%
American Indian and Alaska Native	0	0.0%
Asian	6	0.4%
Native Hawaiian and Other Pacific Islander	1	0.1%
Some other race	15	1.0%
Two or more races	83	5.4%
Hispanic or Latino (of any race)	31	2.0%

=== 2010 census ===
As of the census of 2010, there were 1,520 people, 585 households, and 406 families living in the city. The population density was 1,634.4 inhabitants per square mile (631.0/km^{2}). There were 633 housing units at an average density of 680.6 per square mile (262.8/km^{2}). The racial makeup of the city was 98.6% White, 0.2% Native American, 0.1% Asian, 0.1% Pacific Islander, 0.4% from other races, and 0.7% from two or more races. Hispanic or Latino of any race were 1.1% of the population.

There were 585 households, of which 36.4% had children under the age of 18 living with them, 54.9% were married couples living together, 10.4% had a female householder with no husband present, 4.1% had a male householder with no wife present, and 30.6% were non-families. 23.2% of all households were made up of individuals, and 8.7% had someone living alone who was 65 years of age or older. The average household size was 2.60 and the average family size was 3.12.

The median age in the city was 32.9 years. 28% of residents were under the age of 18; 10.2% were between the ages of 18 and 24; 26.9% were from 25 to 44; 24.5% were from 45 to 64; and 10.5% were 65 years of age or older. The gender makeup of the city was 50.9% male and 49.1% female.

=== 2000 census ===
As of the census of 2000, there were 1,579 people, 583 households, and 432 families living in the city. The population density was 1,720.5 inhabitants per square mile (664.3/km^{2}). There were 609 housing units at an average density of 663.6 per square mile (256.2/km^{2}). The racial makeup of the city was 98.42% White, 0.13% African American, 0.13% Native American, 0.06% Asian, 0.51% from other races, and 0.76% from two or more races. Hispanic or Latino of any race were 1.96% of the population.

There were 583 households, out of which 43.2% had children under the age of 18 living with them, 55.2% were married couples living together, 14.8% had a female householder with no husband present, and 25.9% were non-families. 22.5% of all households were made up of individuals, and 9.8% had someone living alone who was 65 years of age or older. The average household size was 2.71 and the average family size was 3.18.

In the city, the population was spread out, with 32.9% under the age of 18, 9.6% from 18 to 24, 30.8% from 25 to 44, 17.6% from 45 to 64, and 9.1% who were 65 years of age or older. The median age was 30 years. For every 100 females, there were 99.9 males. For every 100 females age 18 and over, there were 93.8 males.

The median income for a household in the city was $40,833, and the median income for a family was $45,781. Males had a median income of $34,091 versus $23,571 for females. The per capita income for the city was $18,061. About 4.9% of families and 5.8% of the population were below the poverty line, including 8.9% of those under age 18 and none of those age 65 or over.

== Education ==
Woodburn is within East Allen County Schools (EACS) and is zoned to Woodlan Elementary School and Woodlan Junior/Senior High School.

Woodburn Lutheran School, a private Preschool-8th grade Christian school, is in the city limits, on Main Street.

Woodburn has a public library, a branch of the Allen County Public Library.

== Notable people ==
- Lloy Ball, professional volleyball player, Olympic gold medalist, 2008 Summer Olympics
- Henry A. Byroade, Brigadier General, United States Army
- Jane E. Henney, Commissioner of Food and Drug Administration
- Terry Hoeppner, former head football coach of Indiana University
- Bree Olson, American pornographic actress
