= Monroeville, Indiana =

- Town
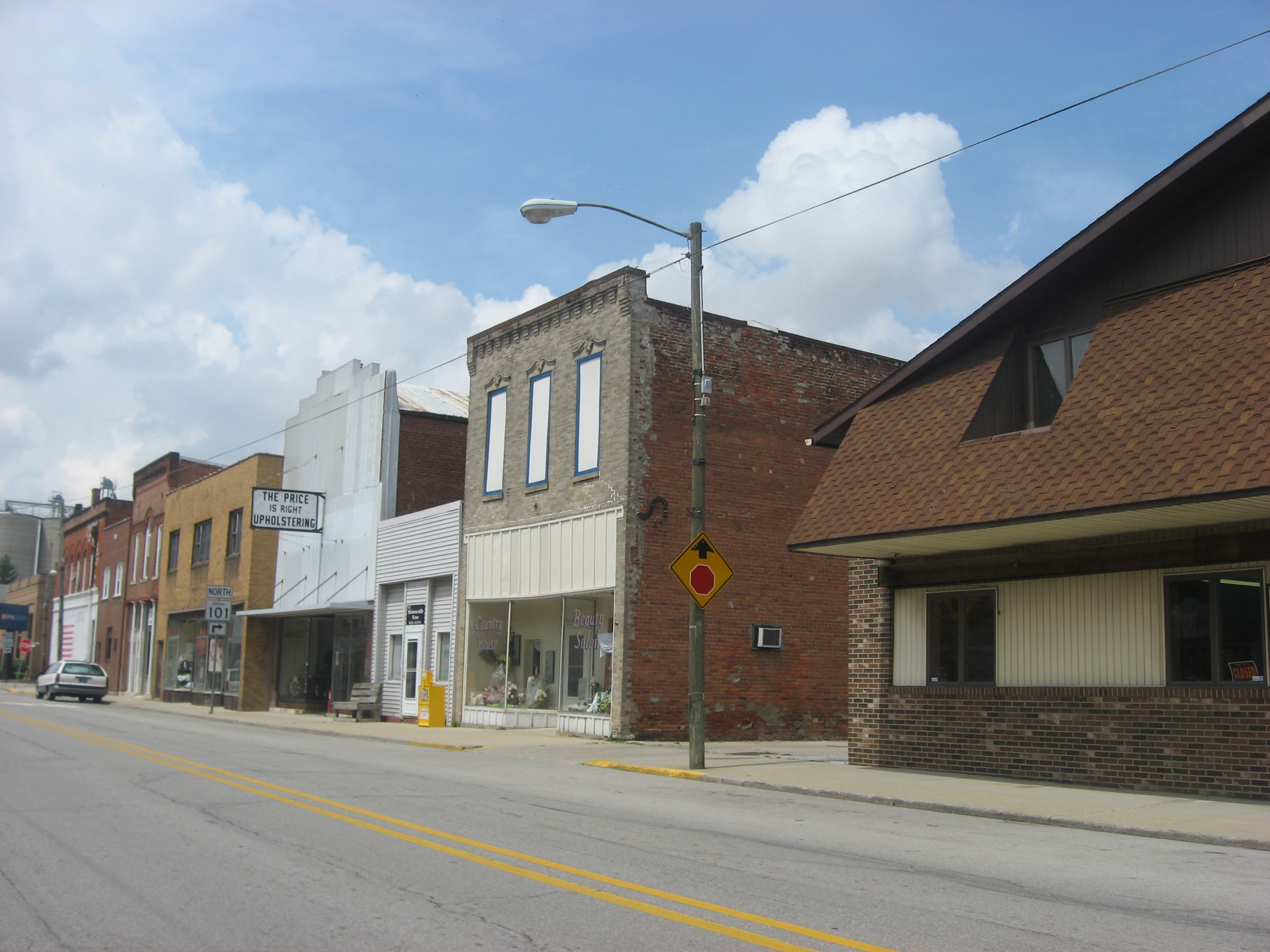
- Downtown Monroeville

- Location of Monroeville in Allen County, Indiana.
- Coordinates: 40°58′22″N 84°52′7″W
- Country: United States
- State: Indiana
- County: Allen
- Township: Monroe
- Founded: 1851
- Incorporated: 1866

Area
  - Total: 0.79 sq mi (2.05 km^{2})
  - Land: 0.79 sq mi (2.05 km^{2})
  - Water: 0 sq mi (0.00 km^{2})
- Elevation: 790 ft (240 m)

Population (2020)
  - Total: 1,294
  - Density: 1,633.8/sq mi (630.82/km^{2})
- Time zone: UTC-5 (Eastern (EST))
  - Summer (DST): UTC-4 (EDT)
- ZIP code: 46773
- Area code: 260
- FIPS code: 18-50562
- GNIS feature ID: 0439348
- Website: monroevillein.com

Monroeville is a town in Monroe Township, Allen County, Indiana, United States. The population was 1,294 as of the 2020 census.

== History ==
Monroeville was platted in 1851. It was named from Monroe Township. A post office was established at Monroeville in 1856. In July 1866, Monroeville was incorporated as a town.

== Geography ==
Monroeville is located at 40°58′22″N 84°52′7″W (40.972799, -84.868598).

According to the 2010 census, Monroeville has a total area of 0.74 square miles (1.92 km^{2}), all land.

== Demographics ==
Historical population
Census	Pop.	Note	%±
1870	630		—
1880	578		−8.3%
1890	673		16.4%
1900	690		2.5%
1910	910		31.9%
1920	864		−5.1%
1930	897		3.8%
1940	994		10.8%
1950	1,150		15.7%
1960	1,294		12.5%
1970	1,353		4.6%
1980	1,372		1.4%
1990	1,232		−10.2%
2000	1,236		0.3%
2010	1,235		−0.1%
2020	1,294		4.8%
U.S. Decennial Census

=== 2020 census ===
As of the 2020 census, Monroeville had a population of 1,294. The median age was 39.5 years. 23.0% of residents were under the age of 18 and 19.4% of residents were 65 years of age or older. For every 100 females there were 96.7 males, and for every 100 females age 18 and over there were 96.1 males age 18 and over.

0.0% of residents lived in urban areas, while 100.0% lived in rural areas.

There were 517 households in Monroeville, of which 33.1% had children under the age of 18 living in them. Of all households, 43.9% were married-couple households, 20.5% were households with a male householder and no spouse or partner present, and 26.1% were households with a female householder and no spouse or partner present. About 33.2% of all households were made up of individuals and 14.7% had someone living alone who was 65 years of age or older.

There were 540 housing units, of which 4.3% were vacant. The homeowner vacancy rate was 1.5% and the rental vacancy rate was 1.4%.

Racial composition as of the 2020 census
Race	Number	Percent
White	1,218	94.1%
Black or African American	2	0.2%
American Indian and Alaska Native	1	0.1%
Asian	5	0.4%
Native Hawaiian and Other Pacific Islander	2	0.2%
Some other race	11	0.9%
Two or more races	55	4.3%
Hispanic or Latino (of any race)	30	2.3%

=== 2010 census ===
As of the census of 2010, there were 1,235 people, 491 households, and 309 families living in the town. The population density was 1,668.9 inhabitants per square mile (644.4/km^{2}). There were 529 housing units at an average density of 714.9 per square mile (276.0/km^{2}). The racial makeup of the town was 98.9% White, 0.1% Pacific Islander, 0.4% from other races, and 0.6% from two or more races. Hispanic or Latino of any race were 1.9% of the population.

There were 491 households, of which 28.9% had children under the age of 18 living with them, 45.8% were married couples living together, 12.4% had a female householder with no husband present, 4.7% had a male householder with no wife present, and 37.1% were non-families. 32.0% of all households were made up of individuals, and 15.7% had someone living alone who was 65 years of age or older. The average household size was 2.40 and the average family size was 3.04.

The median age in the town was 42.3 years. 22.2% of residents were under the age of 18; 9.4% were between the ages of 18 and 24; 22.9% were from 25 to 44; 25.7% were from 45 to 64; and 19.9% were 65 years of age or older. The gender makeup of the town was 47.1% male and 52.9% female.

=== 2000 census ===
As of the census of 2000, there were 1,236 people, 463 households, and 325 families living in the town. The population density was 1,645.8 inhabitants per square mile (635.4/km^{2}). There were 507 housing units at an average density of 675.1 per square mile (260.7/km^{2}). The racial makeup of the town was 96.76% White, 0.16% Asian, 0.49% from other races, and 2.59% from two or more races. Hispanic or Latino of any race were 2.27% of the population.

There were 463 households, out of which 37.6% had children under the age of 18 living with them, 53.6% were married couples living together, 12.1% had a female householder with no husband present, and 29.6% were non-families. 24.8% of all households were made up of individuals, and 12.1% had someone living alone who was 65 years of age or older. The average household size was 2.66 and the average family size was 3.20.

In the town, the population was spread out, with 29.8% under the age of 18, 7.9% from 18 to 24, 30.8% from 25 to 44, 17.6% from 45 to 64, and 13.8% who were 65 years of age or older. The median age was 33 years. For every 100 females, there were 93.7 males. For every 100 females age 18 and over, there were 90.8 males.

The median income for a household in the town was $35,795, and the median income for a family was $41,310. Males had a median income of $31,534 versus $24,853 for females. The per capita income for the town was $16,242. About 6.5% of families and 10.0% of the population were below the poverty line, including 10.9% of those under age 18 and 15.8% of those age 65 or over.

== Education ==
The East Allen County Schools district includes Monroeville, and Heritage Elementary School and Heritage Junior/Senior High School are the facilities Monroeville is zoned to.

Monroeville has a public library, a branch of the Allen County Public Library.

== Arts and culture ==
Monroeville is a popular stop for bicycle tourists traveling on the Adventure Cycling Association routes. The Monroeville Community Center, which provides cyclist-only lodging, showers, and laundry facilities, was awarded the 2005 Trail Angel Award by the Adventure Cycling Association.

== Media ==
- Monroeville News, weekly community newspaper
- Fort Wayne Observed news and commentary weblog

== Notable people ==
- Lloyd C. Douglas, author
