= Hoagland, Indiana =

- Census-designated place
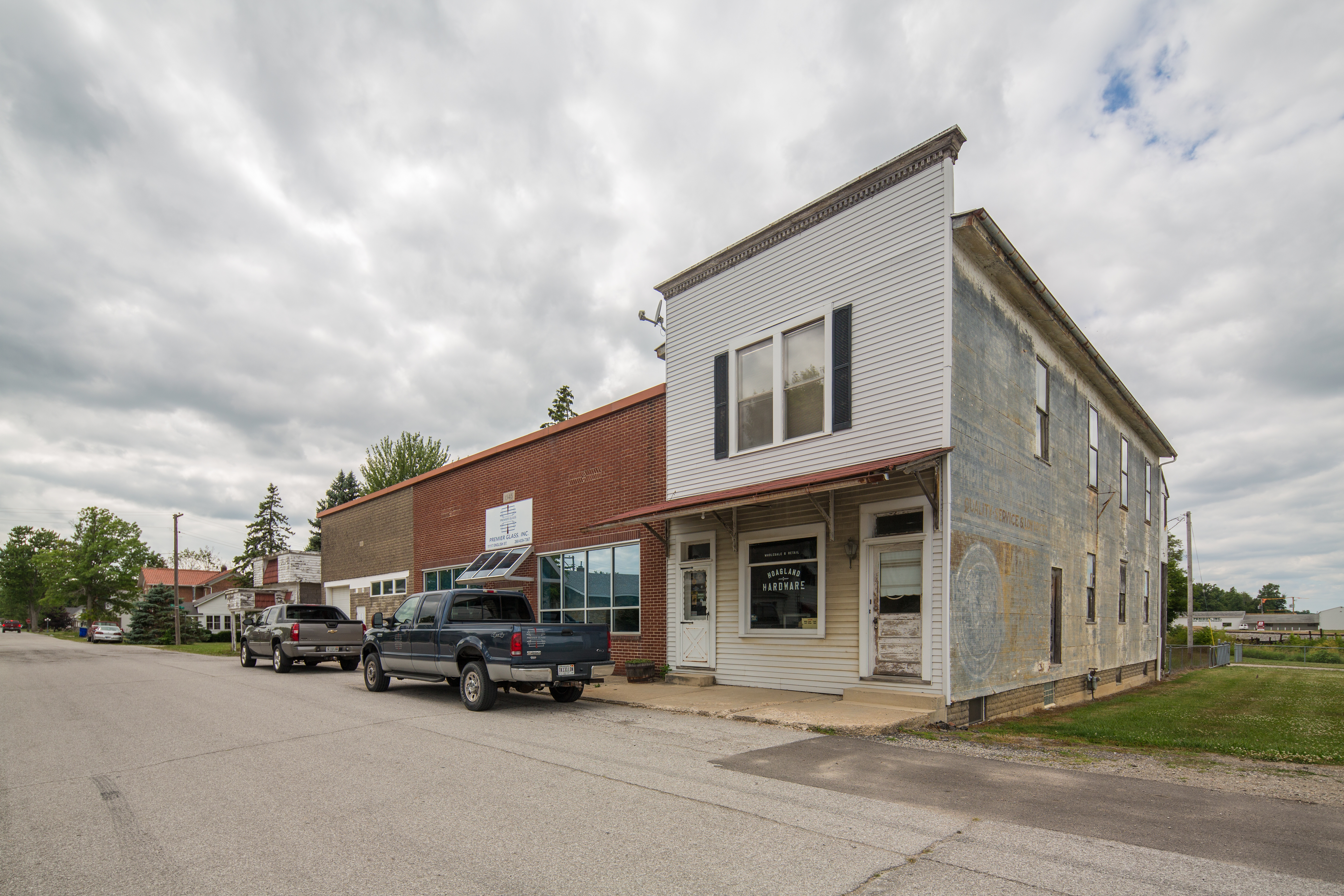

- Location of Hoagland in Allen County, Indiana.
- Coordinates: 40°57′06″N 84°59′55″W
- Country: United States
- State: Indiana
- County: Allen
- Township: Madison
- Platted: 1872

Area
  - Total: 3.40 sq mi (8.80 km^{2})
  - Land: 3.40 sq mi (8.80 km^{2})
  - Water: 0 sq mi (0.00 km^{2})
- Elevation: 824 ft (251 m)

Population (2020)
  - Total: 824
  - Density: 242.4/sq mi (93.61/km^{2})
- Time zone: UTC-5 (Eastern (EST))
  - Summer (DST): UTC-4 (EDT)
- ZIP code: 46745
- Area code: 260
- GNIS feature ID: 2629863

Hoagland is an unincorporated town and census-designated place (CDP) in Madison Township, Allen County, in the U.S. state of Indiana. As of the 2020 census, it had a population of 824.

== History ==
The post office at Hoagland has been in operation since 1872. Hoagland started as a station on the Fort Wayne, Richmond & Cincinnati Railroad.

== Recreation ==
Hoagland Days is held in June.

== Education ==
The East Allen County Schools district includes Hoagland. Heritage Elementary School and Heritage Junior/Senior High School are the facilities to which Hoagland is zoned.

== Notable people ==
- Lydia Allen DeVilbiss, American physician and author, born in Hoagland
