= Harlan, Indiana =

- Census-designated place
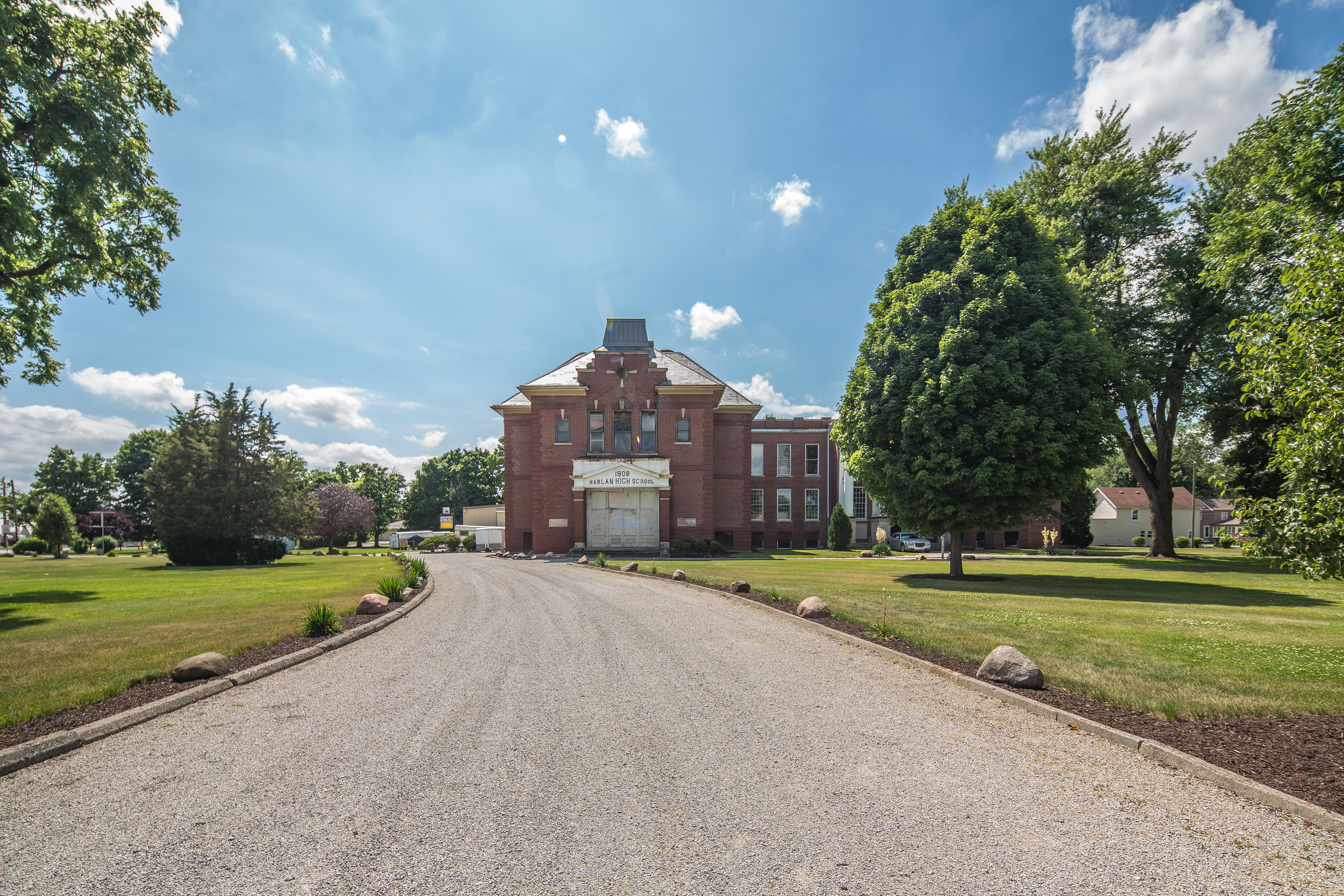
- Harlan High School, built in 1908 and closed in 1965.

- Flag

- Location of Harlan in Allen County, Indiana.
- Coordinates: 41°11′52″N 84°55′23″W
- Country: United States
- State: Indiana
- County: Allen
- Township: Springfield

Area
  - Total: 3.10 sq mi (8.04 km^{2})
  - Land: 3.10 sq mi (8.04 km^{2})
  - Water: 0 sq mi (0.00 km^{2})
- Elevation: 787 ft (240 m)

Population (2020)
  - Total: 1,577
  - Density: 508.0/sq mi (196.14/km^{2})
- Time zone: UTC-5 (Eastern (EST))
  - Summer (DST): UTC-4 (EDT)
- ZIP code: 46743
- Area code: 260
- FIPS code: 18-31432
- GNIS feature ID: 2629852

Harlan is an unincorporated census-designated place (CDP) in Springfield Township, Allen County, in the U.S. state of Indiana. As of the 2020 census, Harlan had a population of 1,577.

== History ==
Harlan was established in 1853 by Lewis Reichelderfer and Julia Ann (Ranck) Reichelderfer, who were husband and wife. It originally comprised two communities, the other of which is now Fort Wayne's Maysville neighborhood. The border between the two towns was Georgetown Road (Indiana State Road 37), with Harlan being on the north side of the road.

The post office at Harlan has been in operation since 1851. Maysville faded from existence soon afterwards.

The area was hit by an EF-2 tornado on March 31, 2023. The tornado formed over Fort Wayne's northeast side before rapidly tracking towards Harlan. Its wind speeds were recorded to be 120 miles per hour and the damage path was measured at 400 yards wide.

== Geography ==
Harlan is located on State Road 37, approximately 15 miles (24 km) northeast of Fort Wayne and 7 miles (11 km) west of the Ohio state line.

== Education ==
Harlan is within East Allen County Schools (EACS) and is zoned to Woodlan Elementary School and Woodlan Junior/Senior High School.

== Demographics ==
Historical population
Census	Pop.	Note	%±
2020	1,577		—
U.S. Decennial Census

=== 2020 census ===
As of the 2020 census, Harlan had a population of 1,577. The median age was 34.1 years. 29.0% of residents were under the age of 18 and 12.6% of residents were 65 years of age or older. For every 100 females there were 93.0 males, and for every 100 females age 18 and over there were 86.4 males age 18 and over.

0.0% of residents lived in urban areas, while 100.0% lived in rural areas.

There were 566 households in Harlan, of which 36.6% had children under the age of 18 living in them. Of all households, 59.0% were married-couple households, 12.2% were households with a male householder and no spouse or partner present, and 22.4% were households with a female householder and no spouse or partner present. About 22.6% of all households were made up of individuals and 10.8% had someone living alone who was 65 years of age or older.

There were 611 housing units, of which 7.4% were vacant. The homeowner vacancy rate was 0.8% and the rental vacancy rate was 10.1%.

Racial composition as of the 2020 census
Race	Number	Percent
White	1,499	95.1%
Black or African American	13	0.8%
American Indian and Alaska Native	0	0.0%
Asian	5	0.3%
Native Hawaiian and Other Pacific Islander	0	0.0%
Some other race	11	0.7%
Two or more races	49	3.1%
Hispanic or Latino (of any race)	43	2.7%
