= Allen County, Indiana =

County in Indiana, United States

- County
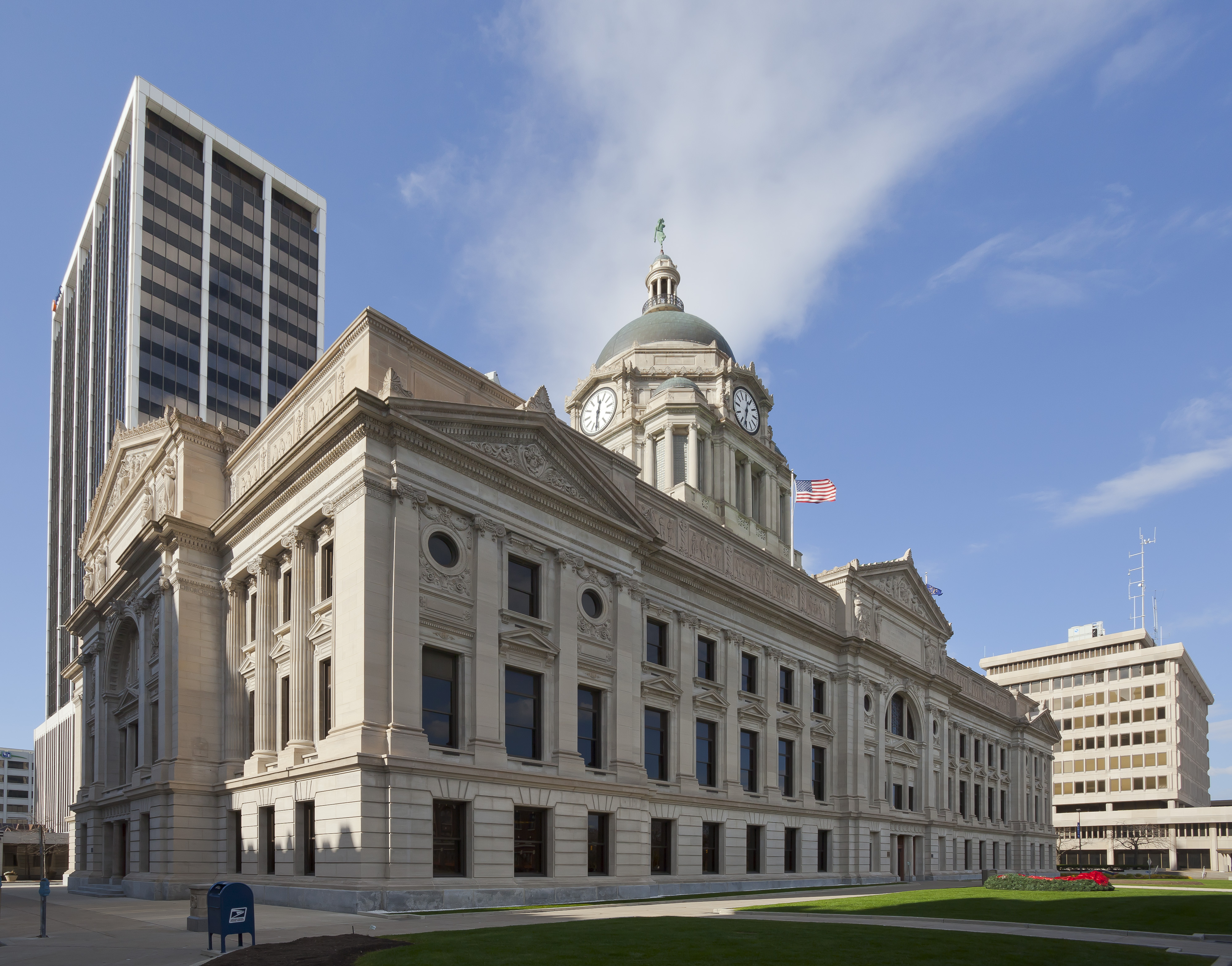
- Allen County Courthouse in Fort Wayne

- Flag Seal

- Location within the U.S. state of Indiana
- Coordinates: 41°05′N 85°04′W
- Country: United States
- State: Indiana
- Founded: April 1, 1824
- Named for: John Allen
- Seat: Fort Wayne
- Largest city: Fort Wayne

Area
  - Total: 660.02 sq mi (1,709.4 km^{2})
  - Land: 657.31 sq mi (1,702.4 km^{2})
  - Water: 2.71 sq mi (7.0 km^{2}) 0.41%

Population (2020)
  - Total: 385,410
  - Estimate (2025): 402,329 ▲
  - Density: 607/sq mi (234/km^{2})
- Time zone: UTC−5 (Eastern)
  - Summer (DST): UTC−4 (EDT)
- Congressional district: 3rd
- Website: www.allencounty.in.gov
- Indiana county number 2; Largest county in Indiana by area; Third largest county in Indiana by population

Allen County is a county in the U.S. state of Indiana. As of the 2020 Census, the population was 385,410, making it the third-most populous county in Indiana. The county seat and largest city is Fort Wayne, the second-largest city in Indiana.

Allen County is included in the Fort Wayne Metropolitan Statistical Area and the Fort Wayne–Huntington–Auburn Combined Statistical Area. Allen County is the cultural and economic center of northeastern Indiana. The county is within a 200-mile (320 km) radius of major population centers, including Chicago, Cincinnati, Cleveland, Columbus, Detroit, Indianapolis, Louisville, Milwaukee, and within a one-day drive of one-third of the U.S. population and one-fifth of Canadians.

Occupied for thousands of years by cultures of indigenous peoples, Allen County was organized by European Americans on December 17, 1823, from Delaware and Randolph counties, and formed on April 1, 1824, at the Ewing Tavern. The county is named for Colonel John Allen, an attorney and Kentucky state senator who was killed in the War of 1812. Fort Wayne, founded at the confluences of the Maumee, St. Joseph, and St. Marys rivers was chosen as the county seat in May 1824.

== Geography ==
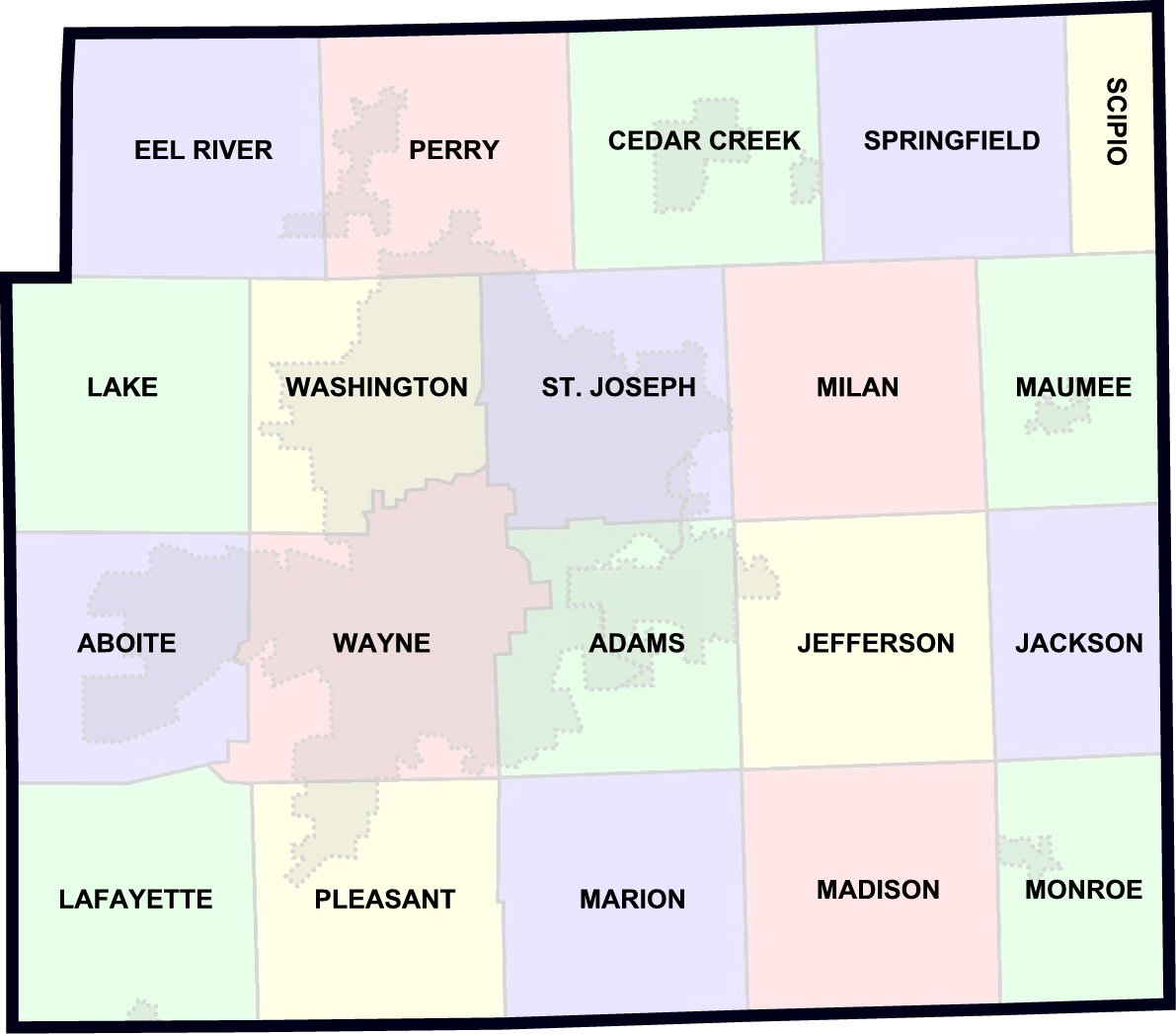
Map of Allen County's 20 townships

According to the 2010 census, the county has a total area of 660.02 square miles (1,709.4 km^{2}), the largest county in Indiana, of which 657.31 square miles (1,702.4 km^{2}) (or 99.59%) is land and 2.71 square miles (7.0 km^{2}) (or 0.41%) is water.

=== Adjacent counties ===
- Noble County (northwest)
- DeKalb County (north)
- Defiance County, Ohio (northeast)
- Paulding County, Ohio (east)
- Van Wert County, Ohio (southeast)
- Adams County (south)
- Wells County (south)
- Huntington County (southwest)
- Whitley County (west)

== Municipalities ==
=== Cities ===
- Fort Wayne
- New Haven
- Woodburn

=== Towns ===
- Grabill
- Huntertown
- Leo-Cedarville
- Monroeville
- Zanesville (partial)

=== Census-designated places ===
- Arcola
- Harlan
- Hessen Cassel
- Hoagland
- Lake Everett

=== Unincorporated communities ===
- Aboite
- Academie
- Ari (partial)
- Bluecast
- Cedar Canyons
- Cuba
- Dixon (partial)
- Dunfee (partial)
- East Liberty
- Eastland Gardens
- Edgerton
- Ellison
- Ellisville
- Five Points
- Hursh
- Maples
- Milan Center
- Nine Mile
- Poe
- River Haven
- Royville
- Sunnymede Woods
- Tanglewood
- Tillman
- Timbercrest
- Townley
- Yoder
- Zulu

=== Extinct ===
- Centreville
- Fairport
- Lewisburg
- Massillon
- Wallen
- Waynedale

=== Townships ===
- Aboite Township
- Adams Township
- Cedar Creek Township
- Eel River Township
- Jackson Township
- Jefferson Township
- Lafayette Township
- Lake Township
- Madison Township
- Marion Township
- Maumee Township
- Milan Township
- Monroe Township
- Perry Township
- Pleasant Township
- Scipio Township
- Springfield Township
- St. Joseph Township
- Washington Township
- Wayne Township

== Demographics ==

Historical population
Census	Pop.	Note	%±
1830	996		—
1840	5,942		496.6%
1850	16,919		184.7%
1860	29,328		73.3%
1870	43,494		48.3%
1880	54,763		25.9%
1890	66,689		21.8%
1900	77,270		15.9%
1910	93,386		20.9%
1920	114,303		22.4%
1930	146,743		28.4%
1940	155,084		5.7%
1950	183,722		18.5%
1960	232,196		26.4%
1970	280,455		20.8%
1980	294,335		4.9%
1990	300,836		2.2%
2000	331,849		10.3%
2010	355,329		7.1%
2020	385,410		8.5%
2025 (est.)	402,329	▲	4.4%
U.S. Decennial Census; 1790-1960 1900-1990; 1990-2000 2010-2019

=== Racial and ethnic composition ===
Allen County, Indiana – Racial and ethnic composition Note: the US Census treats Hispanic/Latino as an ethnic category. This table excludes Latinos from the racial categories and assigns them to a separate category. Hispanics/Latinos may be of any race.
Race / Ethnicity (NH = Non-Hispanic)	Pop 1980	Pop 1990	Pop 2000	Pop 2010	Pop 2020	% 1980	% 1990	% 2000	% 2010	% 2020
White alone (NH)	260,623	261,247	269,732	271,789	270,149	88.55%	86.84%	81.28%	76.49%	70.09%
Black or African American alone (NH)	26,133	30,045	37,149	40,998	43,629	8.88%	9.99%	11.19%	11.54%	11.32%
Native American or Alaska Native alone (NH)	528	835	1,000	987	883	0.18%	0.28%	0.30%	0.28%	0.23%
Asian alone (NH)	1,286	2,543	4,597	9,611	18,191	0.44%	0.85%	1.39%	2.70%	4.72%
Native Hawaiian or Pacific Islander alone (NH)	x	x	103	119	138	x	x	0.03%	0.03%	0.04%
Other race alone (NH)	1,022	345	562	657	1,940	0.35%	0.11%	0.17%	0.18%	0.50%
Mixed race or Multiracial (NH)	x	x	4,829	8,075	17,557	x	x	1.46%	2.27%	4.56%
Hispanic or Latino (any race)	4,743	5,821	13,877	23,093	32,923	1.61%	1.93%	4.18%	6.50%	8.54%
Total	294,335	300,836	331,849	355,329	385,410	100.00%	100.00%	100.00%	100.00%	100.00%

=== 2020 census ===
As of the 2020 census, the county had a population of 385,410. The median age was 36.2 years. 25.5% of residents were under the age of 18 and 15.3% of residents were 65 years of age or older. For every 100 females there were 96.1 males, and for every 100 females age 18 and over there were 93.5 males age 18 and over.

The racial makeup of the county was 71.9% White, 11.5% Black or African American, 0.4% American Indian and Alaska Native, 4.7% Asian, <0.1% Native Hawaiian and Pacific Islander, 4.3% from some other race, and 7.1% from two or more races. Hispanic or Latino residents of any race comprised 8.5% of the population.

87.1% of residents lived in urban areas, while 12.9% lived in rural areas.

There were 151,690 households in the county, of which 31.7% had children under the age of 18 living in them. Of all households, 45.4% were married-couple households, 19.5% were households with a male householder and no spouse or partner present, and 27.7% were households with a female householder and no spouse or partner present. About 29.7% of all households were made up of individuals and 11.0% had someone living alone who was 65 years of age or older.

There were 162,431 housing units, of which 6.6% were vacant. Among occupied housing units, 67.6% were owner-occupied and 32.4% were renter-occupied. The homeowner vacancy rate was 1.2% and the rental vacancy rate was 8.5%.

=== Amish community ===
Since 1852, Allen County has been home to an Old Order Amish community that speaks an Alsatian dialect, which is quite rare among Amish. There are about 3,190 Amish living around Grabill and New Haven as of 2017.

=== 2010 census ===
As of the 2010 United States census, there were 355,329 people, 137,851 households, and 90,892 families residing in the county. The population density was 540.6 inhabitants per square mile (208.7/km^{2}). There were 152,184 housing units at an average density of 231.5 per square mile (89.4/km^{2}). The racial makeup of the county was 79.3% white, 11.7% black or African American, 2.7% Asian, 0.4% American Indian, 0.1% Pacific islander, 2.9% from other races, and 2.9% from two or more races. Those of Hispanic or Latino origin made up 6.5% of the population. In terms of ancestry, 33.4% were German, 11.4% were Irish, 10.7% were American, and 8.1% were English.

Of the 137,851 households, 34.6% had children under the age of 18 living with them, 48.2% were married couples living together, 13.1% had a female householder with no husband present, 34.1% were non-families, and 28.1% of all households were made up of individuals. The average household size was 2.53 and the average family size was 3.12. The median age was 35.3 years.

The median income for a household in the county was $47,697 and the median income for a family was $60,184. Males had a median income of $45,294 versus $33,685 for females. The per capita income for the county was $24,532. About 9.1% of families and 12.3% of the population were below the poverty line, including 17.4% of those under age 18 and 5.8% of those age 65 or over.

=== Burmese refugees ===
In 2007, Fort Wayne was cited as having the highest Burmese refugee population in the United States, with between 3,000 and 3,500.

== Government ==
Allen County Sheriff's Department

Jurisdictional structure
- Operations jurisdiction: Allen County, Indiana, Indiana, United States
- Legal jurisdiction: As per operations jurisdiction
- General nature: Local civilian police

Operational structure
- Agency executive: Troy R. Hershberger, Sheriff

The county government is a constitutional body, and is granted specific powers by the Constitution of Indiana, and by the Indiana Code.

County Council: The seven member county council has the ultimate decision-making power regarding fiscal affairs of the county government and controls all the spending and revenue collection in the county. Four representatives are elected from county districts, and three members are elected at large. The council members serve four-year terms. They are responsible for setting salaries, the annual budget, and special spending. The council also has limited authority to impose local taxes, in the form of an income and property tax that is subject to state level approval, excise taxes, and service taxes.

Board of Commissioners: The executive and administrative body of the county is made of a three-member board of commissioners. The commissioners are elected county-wide, in staggered terms, and each serves a four-year term. One of the commissioners serves as president of the board. The commissioners are charged with enacting and executing legislation, the collection of revenue, and managing the day-to-day functions of the county government.

Court: The county maintains a Circuit Court and a Superior Court. These are the trial courts of general jurisdiction. Allen Superior Court hears the vast majority of cases, and has several divisions with multiple courtrooms. There are 9 judges hearing cases on the Allen Superior Court; the Chief Judge of the Allen Superior Court is the Honorable Frances "Fran" C. Gull, first elected as a judge in 1996.

County Officials: The county has several other elected offices, including sheriff, coroner, auditor, treasurer, recorder, surveyor, and circuit court clerk. Each of these elected officers serves a term of four years and oversees a different part of county government. Members elected to county government positions are required to declare a party affiliation and to be residents of the county.

The county government operates the jail, maintains rural roads, operates the major local courts, keeps files of deeds and mortgages, maintains vital records, administers public health regulations, and participates with the state in the provision of welfare and other social services.

Allen County is part of Indiana's 3rd congressional district and is represented by Marlin Stutzman in the United States Congress. It is part of Indiana Senate districts 14, 15, 16, 17 and 19; and Indiana House of Representatives districts 50, 79, 80, 81, 82, 83, 84 and 85.

Over the last 100 years, Allen County has been a Republican stronghold in presidential elections. The Democratic national landslides of Franklin D. Roosevelt in 1932 and 1936 as well as Lyndon B. Johnson in 1964 constitute the only occasions since then that a Republican presidential candidate failed to carry the county, and even in 1964, Johnson only won the county by 1.4% and less than 1,500 votes. As of 2020, Joe Biden was the highest vote earner for a Democratic candidate in the history of the county with 73,189 votes. Donald Trump achieved the same feat for his party, with 92,083 votes.

Although Allen County is rather conservative for an urban county, the presence of Fort Wayne makes the county one of the Democrats' strongest counties in Indiana. In 2008, Barack Obama became the first Democratic president after Johnson to receive 40% of the county's vote. While he lost the county by 4 points, the closest that a Democrat has come to carrying the county, he won the city of Fort Wayne itself by six points. However, in 2016, Donald Trump won the county by 19 points and city by 6, but in 2020, while Joe Biden lost the county by 11 points, he recaptured Fort Wayne. The last Democratic Governor to win the county was Frank O'Bannon in 2000 and the last Senator was Evan Bayh during his 2004 landslide.

Following the 1930 Census, Fort Wayne was drawn into Indiana's 4th congressional district, which essentially became the 3rd district following 2000 Census. Fort Wayne has been represented in House by Republicans for all but 20 years since 1932. The streak was only broken by four Democrats: James Indus Farley from 1933 to 1939, Edward H. Kruse for a single term in 1949–1951, J. Edward Roush from 1971 to 1977 and Jill Long Thompson from 1989 to 1995.

United States presidential election results for Allen County, Indiana
Year	Republican		Democratic		Third party(ies)	
Year	No.	%	No.	%	No.	%
1888	5,455	35.41%	9,692	62.92%	257	1.67%
1892	5,486	34.03%	10,010	62.09%	625	3.88%
1896	8,467	45.44%	9,909	53.18%	256	1.37%
1900	8,250	42.73%	10,764	55.75%	295	1.53%
1904	10,261	50.38%	9,250	45.42%	856	4.20%
1908	9,468	42.06%	12,145	53.95%	900	4.00%
1912	3,423	18.43%	8,659	46.63%	6,487	34.93%
1916	10,169	46.03%	9,470	42.87%	2,451	11.10%
1920	24,208	57.40%	13,804	32.73%	4,165	9.88%
1924	25,207	54.12%	17,244	37.03%	4,122	8.85%
1928	34,234	56.38%	26,292	43.30%	194	0.32%
1932	27,065	40.66%	38,447	57.76%	1,050	1.58%
1936	24,765	37.44%	39,151	59.19%	2,230	3.37%
1940	40,430	57.18%	29,967	42.38%	312	0.44%
1944	41,907	57.64%	30,445	41.87%	357	0.49%
1948	37,494	54.00%	31,239	44.99%	703	1.01%
1952	54,877	66.16%	27,506	33.16%	558	0.67%
1956	58,210	69.43%	25,444	30.35%	190	0.23%
1960	60,103	60.33%	39,235	39.39%	280	0.28%
1964	49,284	49.11%	50,706	50.53%	363	0.36%
1968	59,211	54.34%	40,411	37.09%	9,332	8.57%
1972	76,924	66.20%	38,621	33.24%	654	0.56%
1976	71,321	60.56%	44,744	37.99%	1,704	1.45%
1980	68,524	57.63%	37,765	31.76%	12,609	10.60%
1984	75,505	65.67%	38,462	33.45%	1,008	0.88%
1988	74,638	64.94%	39,238	34.14%	1,059	0.92%
1992	55,003	45.24%	39,629	32.60%	26,945	22.16%
1996	59,255	53.55%	41,450	37.46%	9,940	8.98%
2000	70,426	61.60%	41,636	36.42%	2,258	1.98%
2004	82,013	63.28%	46,710	36.04%	886	0.68%
2008	77,793	51.67%	71,263	47.34%	1,491	0.99%
2012	84,613	57.46%	60,036	40.77%	2,597	1.76%
2016	83,930	56.47%	55,382	37.26%	9,320	6.27%
2020	92,083	54.31%	73,189	43.16%	4,288	2.53%
2024	90,283	55.17%	69,960	42.75%	3,407	2.08%

=== Elected officials ===
- Board of Commissioners
  - Richard E. Beck Jr.
  - Therese M. Brown
  - F. Nelson Peters
- Prosecuting Attorney, Michael McAlexander
- Sheriff, Troy R. Hershberger
- County Treasurer, William Royce

(information as of January 2024)

== Courthouse ==
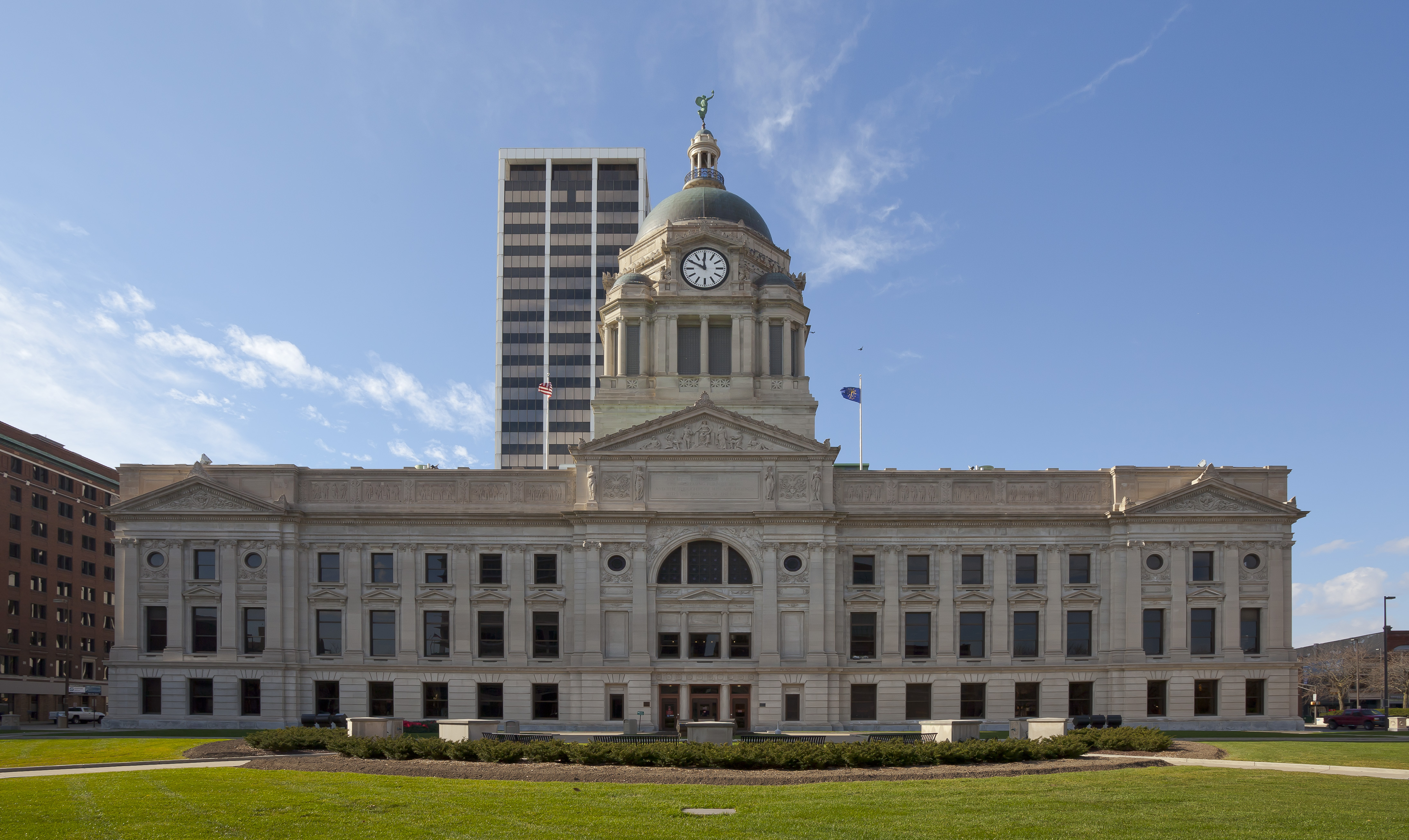
Allen County Courthouse in downtown Fort Wayne (2012)

The Allen County Courthouse was designed by Brentwood S. Tolan of Fort Wayne, and was built by James Stewart and Company of Saint Louis, Missouri. When the cornerstone was laid in 1897, the oldest man in the county, Louis Peltier, was present; he remembered Fort Wayne when it was a fort. The courthouse was completed in 1902 at a total cost of $817,553. At its dedication, Mayor Henry C. Berghoff and Governor Winfield T. Durbin were present. President Theodore Roosevelt was scheduled to attend as well, although he ultimately did not. Built in the Beaux-Arts architecture style, it was one of the most expensive courthouses in the state. It also was filled with artwork that cost more than other entire courthouses of the time. The courthouse has been protected as a National Historic Landmark since 2003. The building is now used primarily by the civil and felony courts, as most of the other county government offices were moved across Main Street to the Edwin J. Rousseau Centre in 1971.

== Climate ==
Fort Wayne, Indiana

Climate chart (precipitation, max. and min. temperature)
J	F	M	A	M	J	J	A	S	O	N	D
2.1 31 16	1.9 36 19	2.9 47 29	3.5 60 38	3.8 72 49	4 81 59	3.6 84 63	3.6 82 60	2.8 75 53	2.6 63 42	3 49 33	2.8 36 22
- █ Average max. and min. temperatures in °F
- █ Precipitation totals in inches
- Source: The Weather Channel
Metric conversion
J	F	M	A	M	J	J	A	S	O	N	D
52 −1 −9	49 2 −7	73 8 −2	90 16 3	95 22 9	103 27 15	91 29 17	91 28 16	71 24 12	67 17 6	76 9 1	70 2 −6
- █ Average max. and min. temperatures in °C
- █ Precipitation totals in mm

In recent years, average temperatures in Fort Wayne have ranged from a low of 16 °F (−9 °C) in January to a high of 84 °F (29 °C) in July, although a record low of −24 °F (−31 °C) was recorded in January 1918 and a record high of 106 °F (41 °C) was recorded in June 1988. Average monthly precipitation ranged from 1.94 inches (49 mm) in February to 4.04 inches (103 mm) in June.

== Economy ==
In the latter half of the 20th century, shifts in manufacturing patterns led to the reduction of the number of manufacturing plants and jobs in Allen County. However, Allen County's economy has diversified with time to include defense and security, healthcare, and insurance. Agriculture is also a vital part of the county's economy. In 2009, Forbes ranked the Fort Wayne metropolitan area 67th on its list of 200 metropolitan areas in the "Best Places For Business And Careers" report. Individually, Fort Wayne was ranked 5th in cost of living and 12th in cost of doing business.

Allen County's largest employers in 2025:

- Parkview Health (8,986)
- Amazon (4,756)
- General Motors Fort Wayne Assembly (4,255)
- Lutheran Health Network (4,075)
- Sweetwater Sound (2,513)
- Lincoln Financial Group (1,700)
- BFGoodrich (1,500)
- Fort Wayne Metals (1,500)
- Shambaugh & Son (1,500)
- Steel Dynamics (1,200)

Other notable companies with headquarters in Allen County include Brotherhood Mutual Insurance Company, Do it Best, Franklin Electric, Global Van Lines, Indiana Michigan Power, K&K Insurance, MedPro Group, North American Van Lines, Rea Magnet Wire Company, and Vera Bradley.

== Education ==
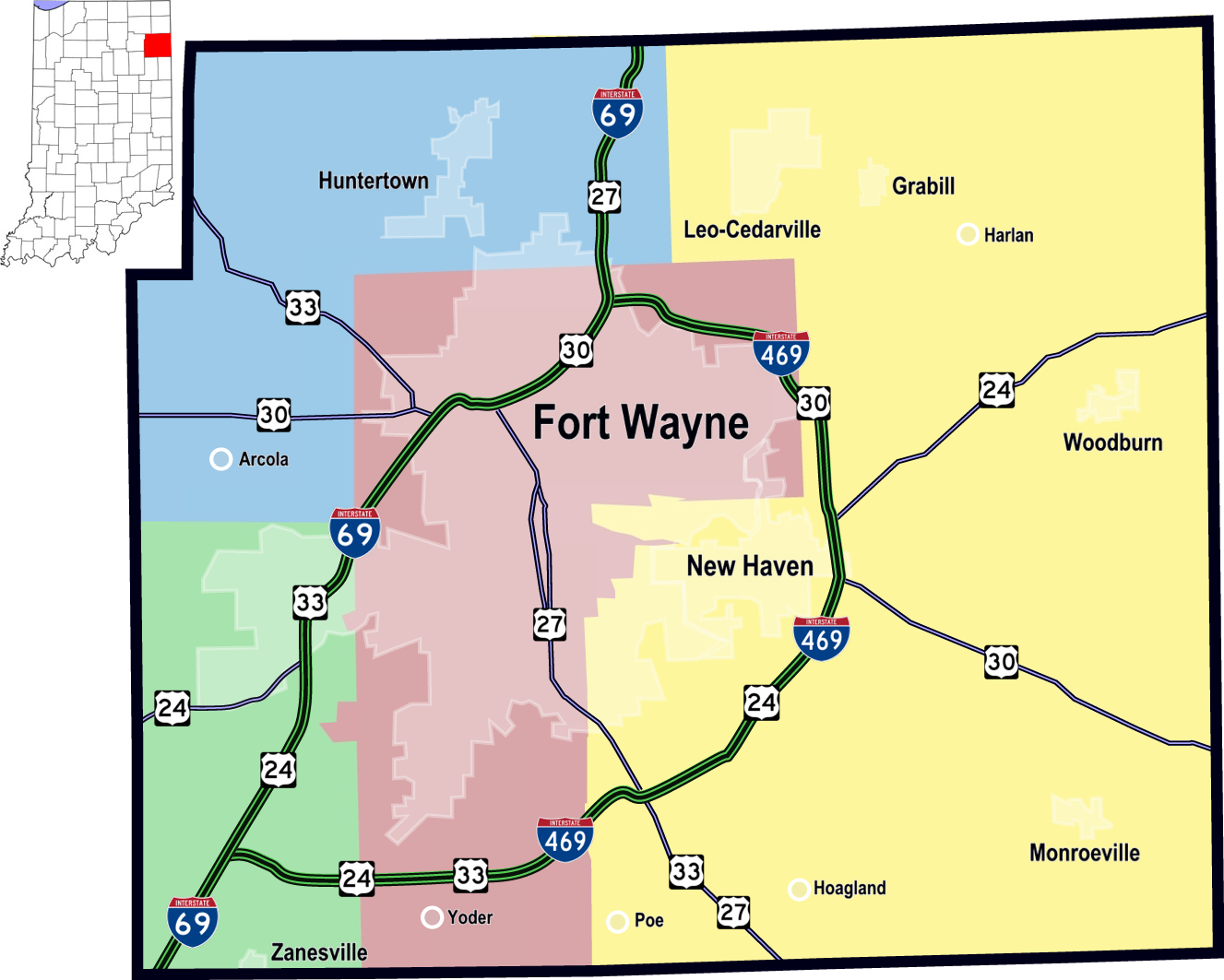
Map of public school districts in Allen County: East Allen County Schools (yellow), Fort Wayne Community Schools (mauve), Northwest Allen County Schools (blue), and Southwest Allen County Schools (green)

Public education is offered across four school districts: East Allen County Schools, Fort Wayne Community Schools, Northwest Allen County Schools, and Southwest Allen County Schools. By means of private education, the Roman Catholic Diocese of Fort Wayne-South Bend operate 13 schools within Allen County, while Lutheran Schools of Indiana operate 14 schools within the county. In addition, Blackhawk Christian School and Canterbury School offer private K-12 education in Fort Wayne, while Amish Parochial Schools of Indiana has schools through eighth grade in rural eastern Allen County.

Public institutions in Allen County include Purdue University Fort Wayne, Ivy Tech Community College, and Indiana University Fort Wayne, home to the Fort Wayne Center for Medical Education, a branch of the IU School of Medicine. Private institutions in Allen County include Concordia Theological Seminary, Indiana Tech, and the University of Saint Francis, as well as branch campuses of Indiana Wesleyan University, Manchester University, and Trine University.

=== Libraries ===
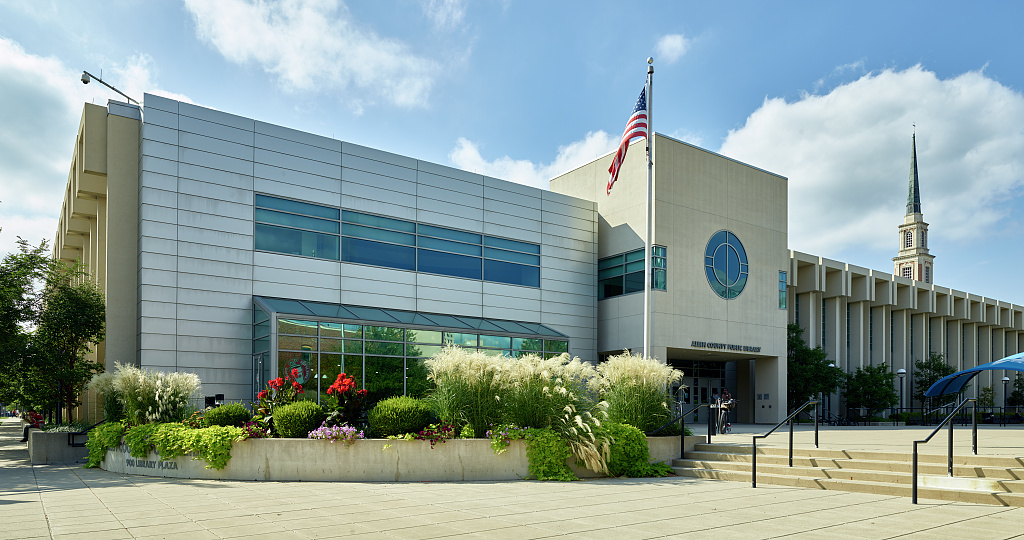
Allen County Public Library, Main Library in downtown Fort Wayne (2016)

Library services are provided to county residents by the Allen County Public Library across 13 branches. The Main Library in downtown Fort Wayne covers 367,000 square feet (34,100 m^{2}) and features an art gallery, underground parking garage, bookstore, café, and auditorium. According to data from 2005, 5.4 million materials were borrowed by patrons, and 2.5 million visits were made throughout the library system. The Fred J. Reynolds Historical Genealogy Department at the Main Library is the largest public genealogy department in the United States.

== Parks ==
Allen County Parks are only partially tax supported. Operating expenses must be met through user and program fees. Admission is $2.00 per person age 7 and older. Passes are available on an annual basis (good for one year from purchase date) starting at $15.00. Activities at various parks include hiking, swimming, fishing, sledding, cross-country skiing (rentals available), playgrounds, picnic areas, play fields, and many nature-based programs for all ages. Wheeled vehicles (except wheelchairs) are not permitted on trails, and pets are not permitted in the state nature preserve areas (clearly marked).

Allen County Parks manage six park properties:

- Cook's Landing (north)
- Deer Run (northeast, near Spencerville)
- Fox Island (southwest, near Aboite)
- Hanauer Reserve (northwest)
- Metea (northeast, near Leo-Cedarville)
- Payton (north, near Huntertown)

== Transportation ==
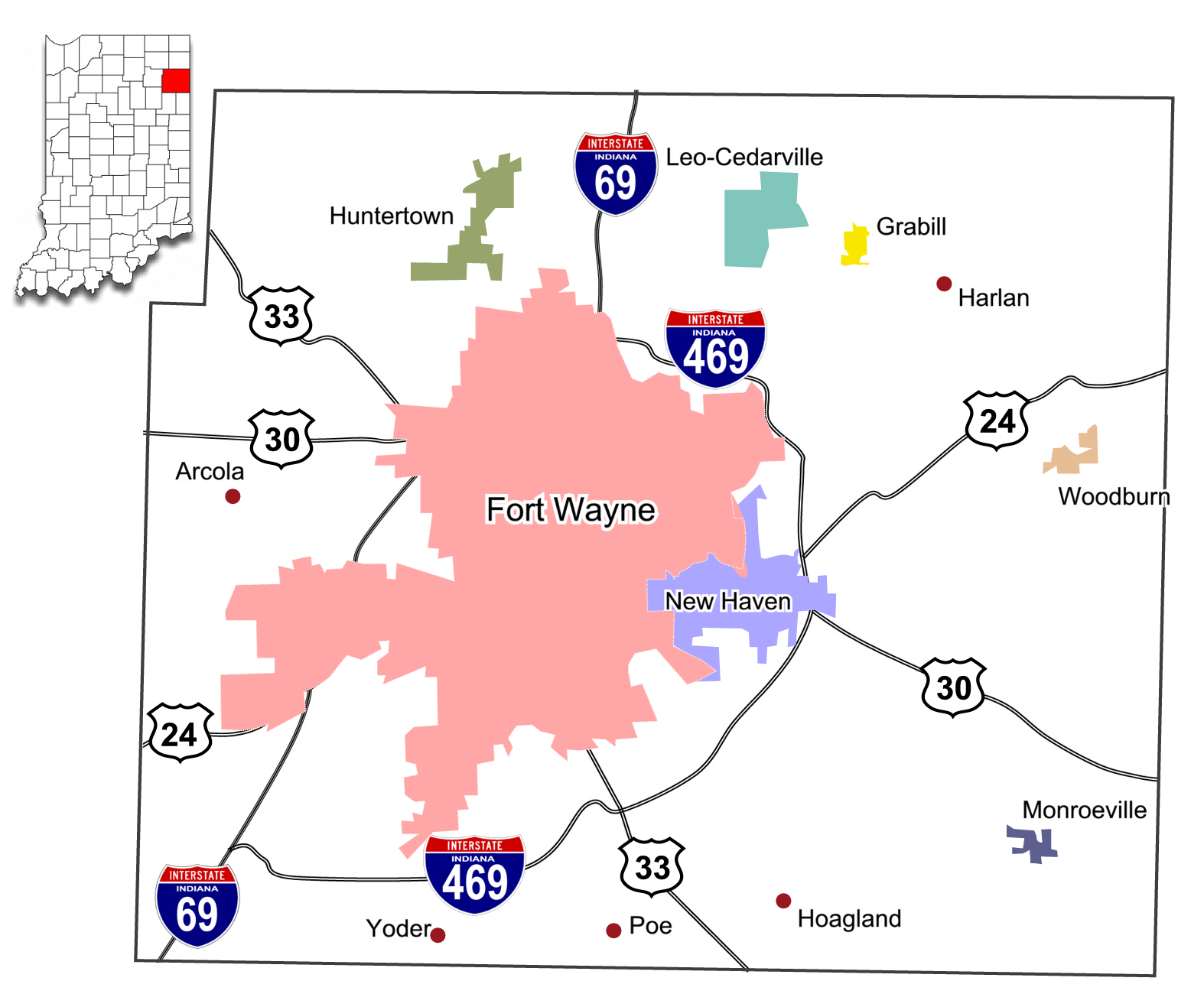
Map of Allen County, Indiana, with municipalities and major roadways. Unincorporated towns represented by red dot.

=== Highways ===
- I-69
- I-469
- US 24
- US 27
- US 30
- US 33
- SR 1
- SR 3
- SR 14
- SR 37
- SR 101
- SR 205
- SR 930

- Airport Expressway

=== Airports ===
- Fort Wayne International Airport
- Smith Field

=== Railroads ===
- Chicago Fort Wayne and Eastern Railroad
- CSX Transportation
- Napoleon, Defiance & Western Railroad
- Norfolk Southern Railway

== See also ==
- National Register of Historic Places listings in Allen County, Indiana
