= Center School =

Center School might refer to:

- The Center School (Manhattan), a middle school in Manhattan
- The Center School (Seattle, Washington), a high school in Seattle
- Center School (Brookfield, Connecticut), an elementary school in Connecticut
- Center School (Omaha, Nebraska), a registered historical site in Nebraska
- Center School (Southwest Allen County Schools), a historic one-room schoolhouse in Allen County, Indiana
