= Leo-Cedarville, Indiana =

- Town
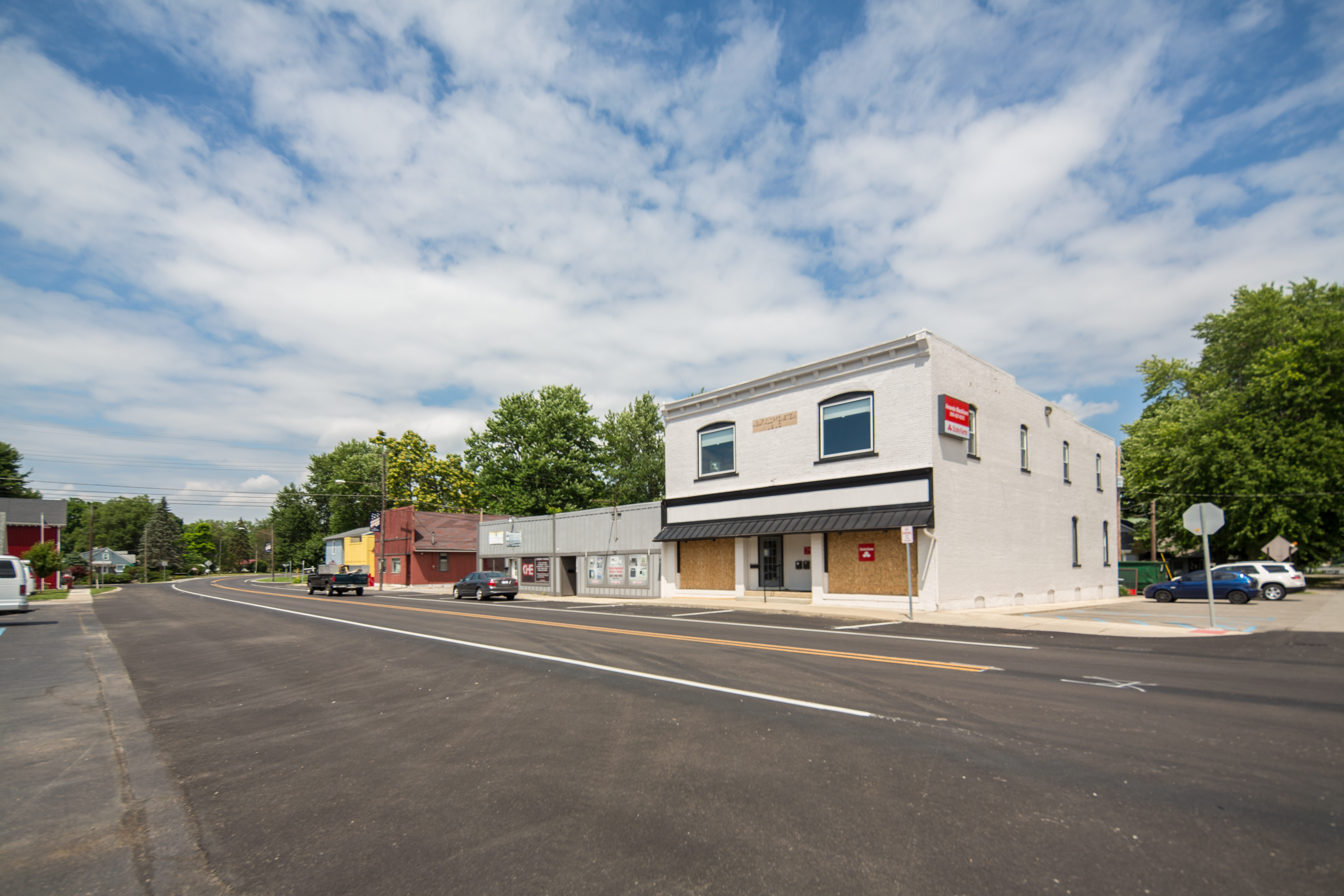
- Motto: "A Sense Of Community"
- Location of Leo-Cedarville in Allen County, Indiana.
- Coordinates: 41°12′54″N 85°0′56″W
- Country: United States
- State: Indiana
- County: Allen
- Township: Cedar Creek

Area
  - Total: 3.86 sq mi (9.99 km^{2})
  - Land: 3.73 sq mi (9.65 km^{2})
  - Water: 0.13 sq mi (0.34 km^{2})
- Elevation: 797 ft (243 m)

Population (2020)
  - Total: 3,624
  - Density: 973/sq mi (375.7/km^{2})
- Time zone: UTC-5 (Eastern (EST))
  - Summer (DST): UTC-4 (EDT)
- ZIP code: 46765
- Area code: 260
- FIPS code: 18-42861
- GNIS feature ID: 1681810
- Website: www.leocedarville.com

Leo-Cedarville is a town in Cedar Creek Township, Allen County, Indiana, United States. The population was 3,624 at the 2020 census.

== History ==
Once separate villages, Cedarville was platted in 1838, and Leo was founded in 1849, originally as the Town of Hamilton.

Leo-Cedarville was established by the incorporation of the villages of Leo and Cedarville in 1996 so that the neighboring city of Fort Wayne would be unable to annex the two towns.

The Hursh Road Bridge was added to the National Register of Historic Places in 1981 and delisted in 1993.

== Geography ==
Leo-Cedarville is located at 41°12′54″N 85°0′56″W (41.214899, -85.015475) along the St. Joseph River and the Cedarville Reservoir.

According to the 2010 census, Leo-Cedarville has a total area of 3.85 square miles (9.97 km^{2}), of which 3.71 square miles (9.61 km^{2}) (or 96.36%) is land and 0.14 square miles (0.36 km^{2}) (or 3.64%) is water.

== Education ==
The town is served by East Allen County Schools. This includes Cedarville Elementary School, Leo Elementary School, and Leo Junior/Senior High School.

== Demographics ==
Historical population
Census	Pop.	Note	%±
2000	2,782		—
2010	3,603		29.5%
2020	3,624		0.6%
U.S. Decennial Census

=== 2020 census ===
As of the 2020 census, Leo-Cedarville had a population of 3,624. The median age was 39.6 years. 27.9% of residents were under the age of 18 and 14.2% of residents were 65 years of age or older. For every 100 females there were 97.2 males, and for every 100 females age 18 and over there were 96.2 males age 18 and over.

0.0% of residents lived in urban areas, while 100.0% lived in rural areas.

There were 1,241 households in Leo-Cedarville, of which 40.9% had children under the age of 18 living in them. Of all households, 70.3% were married-couple households, 11.2% were households with a male householder and no spouse or partner present, and 15.9% were households with a female householder and no spouse or partner present. About 15.8% of all households were made up of individuals and 7.4% had someone living alone who was 65 years of age or older.

There were 1,279 housing units, of which 3.0% were vacant. The homeowner vacancy rate was 1.0% and the rental vacancy rate was 3.4%.

Racial composition as of the 2020 census
Race	Number	Percent
White	3,420	94.4%
Black or African American	26	0.7%
American Indian and Alaska Native	4	0.1%
Asian	13	0.4%
Native Hawaiian and Other Pacific Islander	0	0.0%
Some other race	24	0.7%
Two or more races	137	3.8%
Hispanic or Latino (of any race)	96	2.6%

=== 2010 census ===
As of the census of 2010, there were 3,603 people, 1,187 households, and 1,007 families living in the town. The population density was 971.2 inhabitants per square mile (375.0/km^{2}). There were 1,234 housing units at an average density of 332.6 per square mile (128.4/km^{2}). The racial makeup of the town was 97.1% White, 0.1% African American, 0.2% Native American, 0.8% Asian, 0.6% from other races, and 1.2% from two or more races. Hispanic or Latino of any race were 1.6% of the population.

There were 1,187 households, of which 48.4% had children under the age of 18 living with them, 73.3% were married couples living together, 7.1% had a female householder with no husband present, 4.5% had a male householder with no wife present, and 15.2% were non-families. 13.1% of all households were made up of individuals, and 5.7% had someone living alone who was 65 years of age or older. The average household size was 3.04 and the average family size was 3.32.

The median age in the town was 38.1 years. 32.3% of residents were under the age of 18; 7.1% were between the ages of 18 and 24; 24% were from 25 to 44; 27.2% were from 45 to 64; and 9.4% were 65 years of age or older. The gender makeup of the town was 49.8% male and 50.2% female.

=== 2000 census ===
As of the census of 2000, there were 2,782 people, 922 households, and 778 families living in the town. The population density was 745.1 inhabitants per square mile (287.7/km^{2}). There were 939 housing units at an average density of 251.5 per square mile (97.1/km^{2}). The racial makeup of the town was 97.81% White, 0.07% African American, 0.29% Native American, 0.40% Asian, 0.29% from other races, and 1.15% from two or more races. Hispanic or Latino of any race were 1.04% of the population.

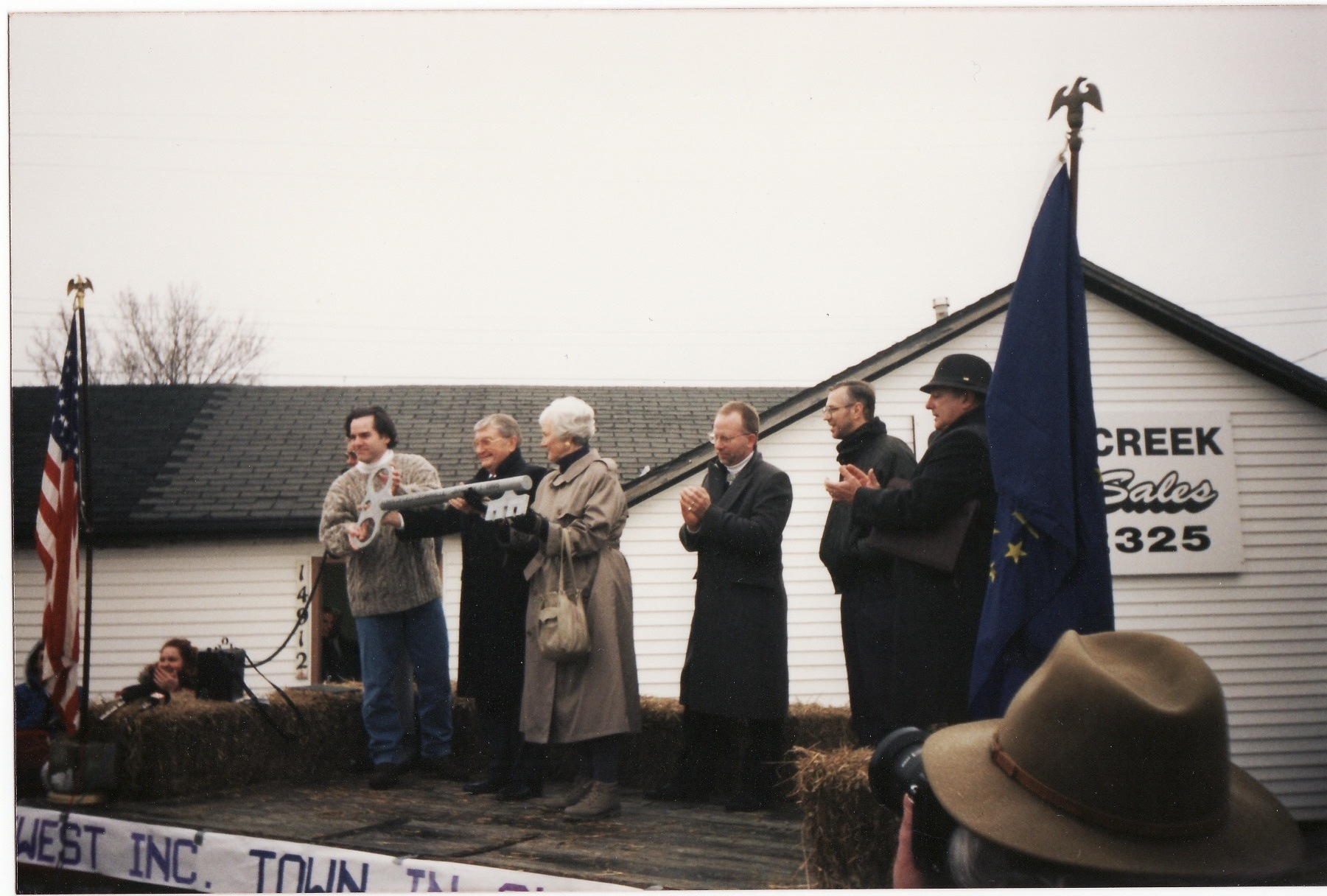
Town and county officials gathered for the incorporation ceremonies of Leo-Cedarville

There were 922 households, out of which 47.3% had children under the age of 18 living with them, 76.2% were married couples living together, 5.7% had a female householder with no husband present, and 15.6% were non-families. 13.0% of all households were made up of individuals, and 5.5% had someone living alone who was 65 years of age or older. The average household size was 3.02 and the average family size was 3.33.

In the town, the population was spread out, with 32.9% under the age of 18, 6.2% from 18 to 24, 32.6% from 25 to 44, 19.9% from 45 to 64, and 8.4% who were 65 years of age or older. The median age was 34 years. For every 100 females, there were 98.0 males. For every 100 females age 18 and over, there were 98.5 males.

The median income for a household in the town was $66,652, and the median income for a family was $70,750. Males had a median income of $48,438 versus $25,552 for females. The per capita income for the town was $22,170. About 1.0% of families and 1.2% of the population were below the poverty line, including none of those under age 18 and 8.6% of those age 65 or over.
