= Royville, Indiana =

- Unincorporated town
- Location within Indiana Location within the United States
- Coordinates: 41°11′59″N 85°07′59″W
- Country: United States
- State: Indiana
- County: Allen
- Township: Perry
- Elevation: 850 ft (260 m)
- Time zone: UTC-5 (Eastern (EST))
  - Summer (DST): UTC-4 (EDT)
- ZIP code: 46845
- Area code: 260
- GNIS feature ID: 442378

Royville is an unincorporated town in Perry Township, Allen County, in the U.S. state of Indiana.

== Government ==
Indiana's 3rd congressional district

- State Senate District 15 Liz Brown
- State House District 84 Robert Morris

== Cemeteries ==
- Union Chapel Cemetery

== School districts ==
- Northwest Allen County Schools (NACS)
