= Perry Township, Allen County, Indiana =

Perry Township
- Township
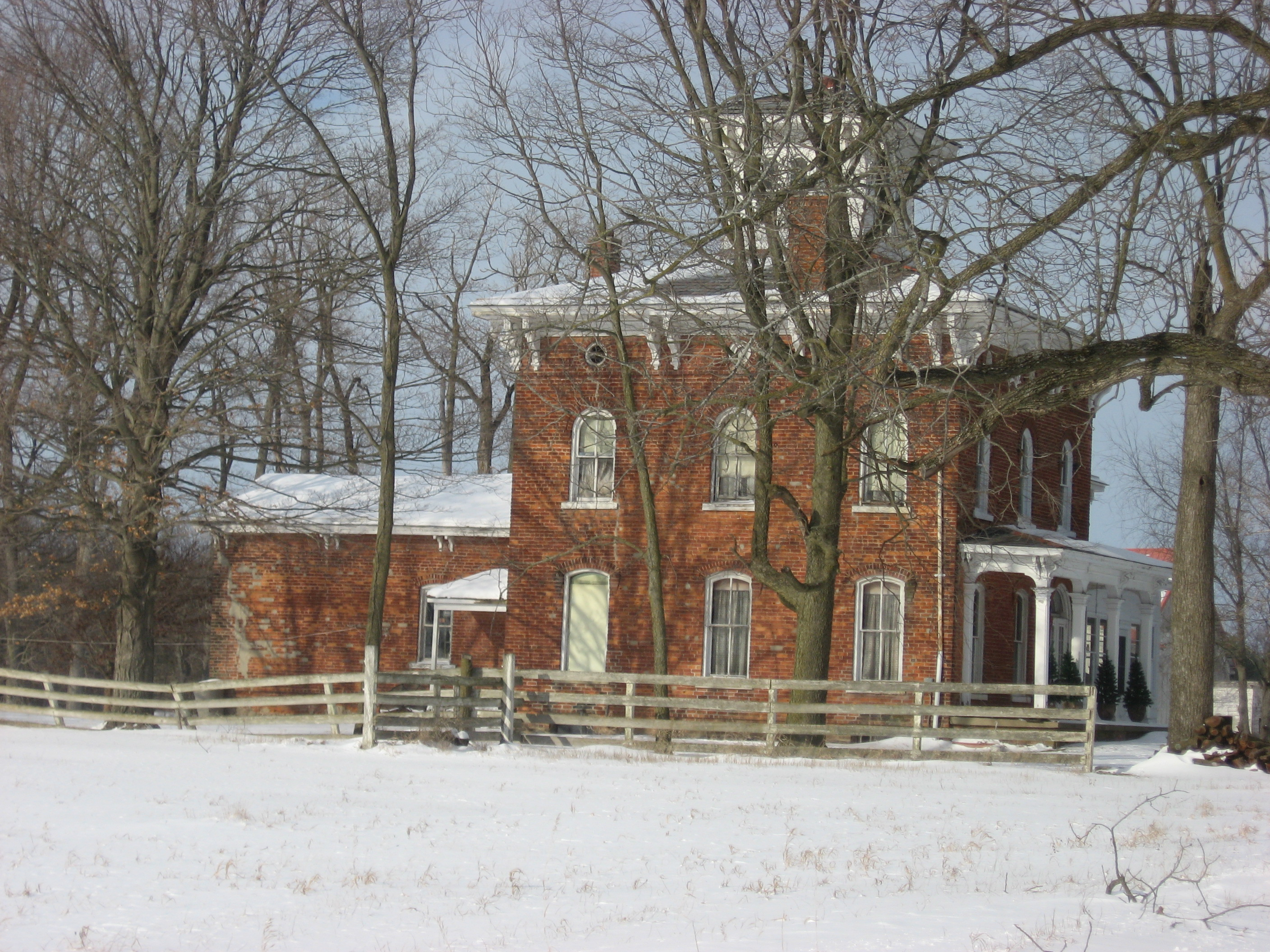
- Fisher West Farmhouse, a historic site in the township

- Location in Allen County, Indiana
- Coordinates: 41°13′11″N 85°07′35″W
- Country: United States
- State: Indiana
- County: Allen

Government
  - Type: Indiana township

Area
  - Total: 35.63 sq mi (92.27 km^{2})
  - Land: 35.52 sq mi (91.99 km^{2})
  - Water: 0.11 sq mi (0.28 km^{2}) 0.30%
- Elevation: 860 ft (262 m)

Population (2020)
  - Total: 37,592
  - Density: 820/sq mi (317/km^{2})
- ZIP codes: 46706, 46748, 46765, 46818, 46845
- GNIS feature ID: 0453715

Perry Township is one of twenty townships in Allen County, Indiana, United States. As of the 2010 census, its population was 29,158, up from 18,170 in 2000.

== History ==
The Dutch Ridge Historic District and Fisher West Farm are listed on the National Register of Historic Places. The Irene Byron Tuberculosis Sanatorium-Physician Residences were listed between 2004 and 2013.

== Geography ==
According to the United States Census Bureau, Perry Township covers an area of 35.63 square miles (92.27 km^{2}); of this, 35.52 square miles (91.99 km^{2}) is land and 0.11 square miles (0.28 km^{2}), or 0.30 percent, is water.

=== Cities, towns, villages ===
- Fort Wayne (north edge)
- Huntertown (northeast three-quarters)

=== Unincorporated towns ===
- Cedar Canyons at 41.232827°N 85.089137°W
- Royville at 41.199771°N 85.133027°W

(This list is based on USGS data and may include former settlements.)

=== Adjacent townships ===
- Butler Township, DeKalb County (north)
- Jackson Township, DeKalb County (northeast)
- Cedar Creek Township (east)
- St. Joseph Township (southeast)
- Washington Township (southwest)
- Eel River Township (west)
- Swan Township, Noble County (northwest)

=== Cemeteries ===
The township contains Huntertown Cemetery.

=== Major highways ===
- I-69
- I-469
- SR 1
- SR 3

=== Airports and landing strips ===
- Exner Airport

== School districts ==
- Northwest Allen County Schools

== Political districts ==
- Indiana's 3rd congressional district
- State House District 85
- State Senate District 14
- State Senate District 15
