= Dutch Ridge Historic District =

Historic district in Indiana, United States

- U.S. National Register of Historic Places
- U.S. Historic district
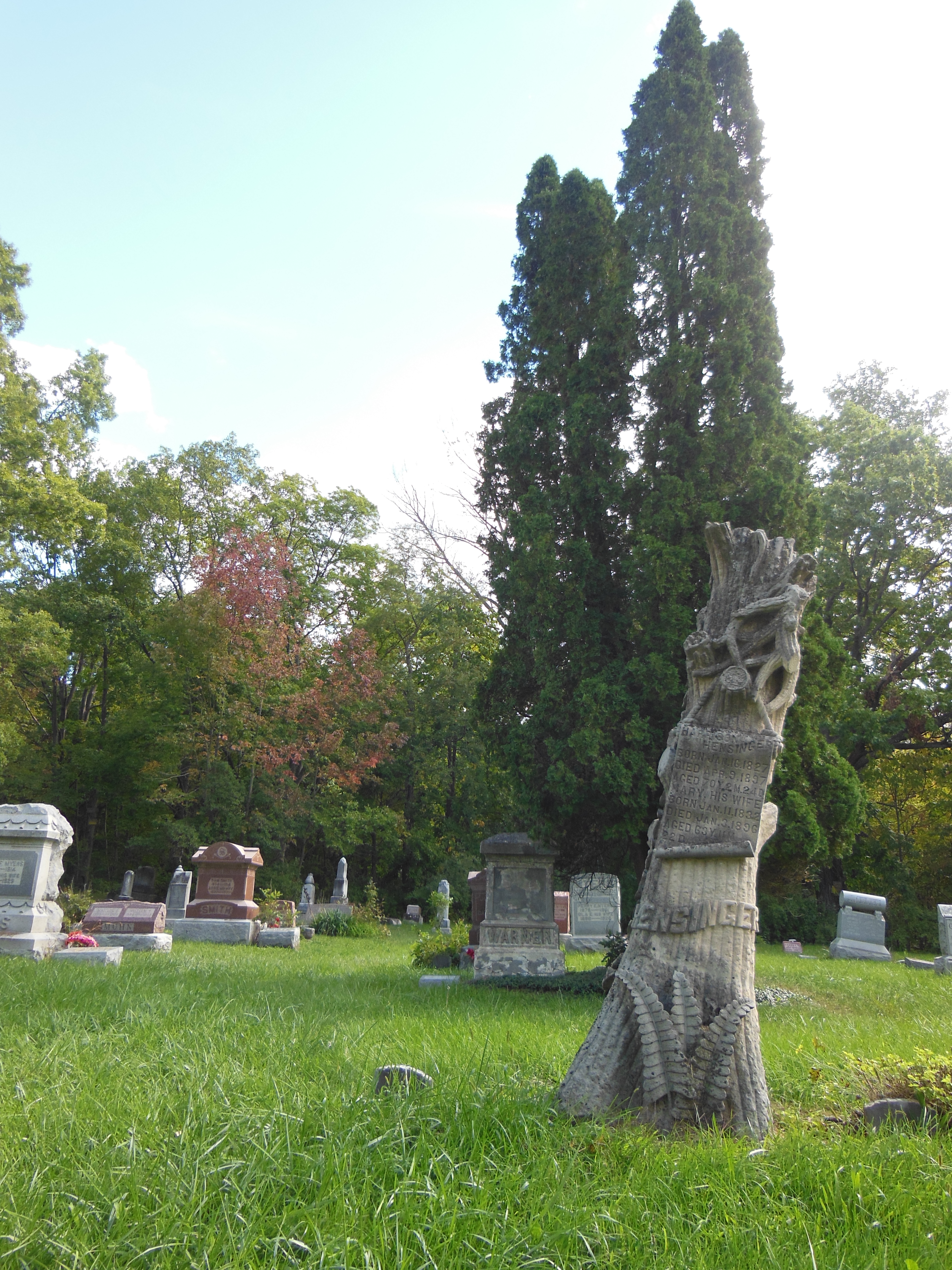
- Dutch Ridge Cemetery, September 2012

- Location within Indiana Location within the United States
- Location: 17915 and 17819 Old Auburn Rd. and adjacent cemetery, northeast of Huntertown, Perry Township, Allen County, Indiana
- Coordinates: 41°15′4″N 85°5′48″W
- Area: 4 acres (1.6 ha)
- Built: 1876, 1888
- Architectural style: Queen Anne, Gothic
- NRHP reference No.: 95001110
- Added to NRHP: September 14, 1995

Dutch Ridge Historic District is a national historic district located in Perry Township, Allen County, Indiana. The district encompasses two contributing buildings and one contributing site in Perry Township. They are the Perry Township District School #1, or Dutch Ridge School (1888) with Queen Anne style design elements and the Late Gothic Revival style Salem Reformed Church (1876). Also located in the district is the Dutch Ridge Cemetery.

It was listed on the National Register of Historic Places in 1995.
