= Milan Center, Indiana =

- Unincorporated community
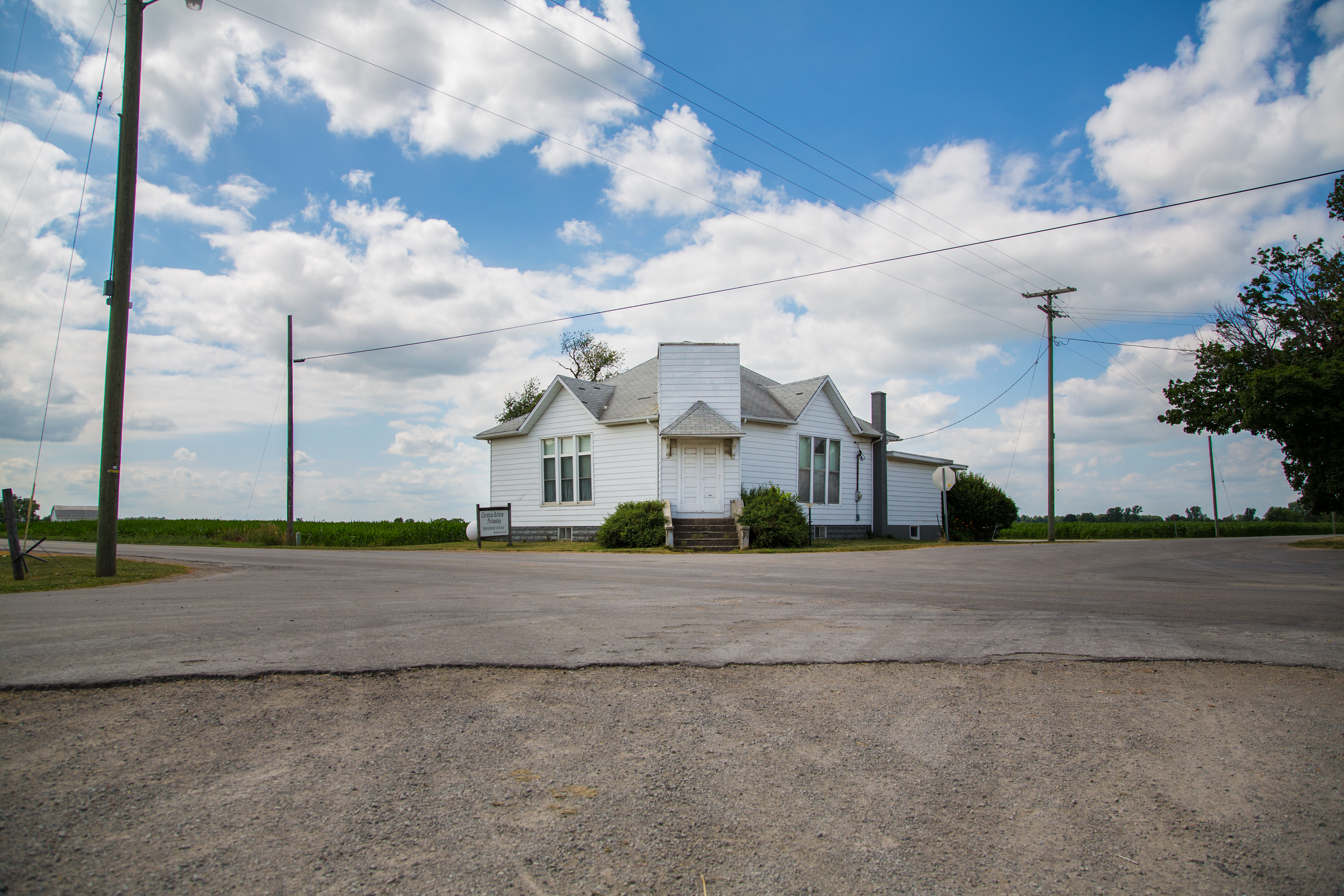

- Location within Indiana Location within the United States
- Coordinates: 41°08′39″N 84°56′46″W
- Country: United States
- State: Indiana
- County: Allen
- Township: Milan
- Elevation: 758 ft (231 m)
- Time zone: UTC-5 (Eastern (EST))
  - Summer (DST): UTC-4 (EDT)
- ZIP code: 46774
- Area code: 260
- GNIS feature ID: 439133

Milan Center is an unincorporated community in Milan Township, Allen County, in the U.S. state of Indiana.

== History ==
Milan Center was named from Milan Township.
