= Center School (Southwest Allen County Schools) =

Coordinates: 41°02′41.3″N 85°16′49.7″W

- Interactive map of the Center School area

General information
- Status: Field trip destination
- Type: one-room schoolhouse
- Location: 10537 Aboite Center Road; Fort Wayne, IN 46804
- Year built: 1893
- Relocated: June 1993
- Renovated: summer 1995
- Owner: SACS

Technical details
- Material: brick, slate, copper

Center School, sometimes called the Old Center School, is a historic one-room schoolhouse in Allen County, Indiana. It was built in 1893 at the center of Aboite Township, and became the foundation of Southwest Allen County Schools.

Center School was closed in 1946, as a part of Indiana's increased consolidation of small schools, but in 1969, a new teacher was instated with the official title of schoolmarm, and it was reopened as a site for history classes.

Originally constructed at what is now the intersection between Homestead Road and Aboite Center Road, in June 1993 the building was physically relocated eastward along Aboite Center by three-tenths of a mile, and was restored in the summer of 1995. The restoration won the 1995 Archie Award from the Arch Foundation.

Center School is built of local brick, and has a slate roof with copper ridge caps. The interior features arches and oak woodwork, which, along with the floor, have been restored. The structure is topped with a copper-capped belfry, the likeness of which is used as the logo of Southwest Allen County Schools.
