= Hursh, Indiana =

- Unincorporated community
- Location within Indiana Location within the United States
- Coordinates: 41°14′53″N 84°58′27″W
- Country: United States
- State: Indiana
- County: Allen
- Township: Cedar Creek
- Platted: 1867
- Elevation: 794 ft (242 m)
- Time zone: UTC-5 (Eastern (EST))
  - Summer (DST): UTC-4 (EDT)
- ZIP code: 46788
- Area code: 260
- GNIS feature ID: 436653

Hursh is an unincorporated community in Cedar Creek Township, Allen County, in the U.S. state of Indiana.

== History ==
Hursh was originally platted as the Town of Urbanna in 1867. A post office was established at Hursh in 1882, and remained in operation until 1903. The community was named after the Hursh family of settlers.
