= Southwest Allen County Schools =

Public school district in northeast Indiana

Coordinates: 41°02′20.7″N 85°17′05.7″W

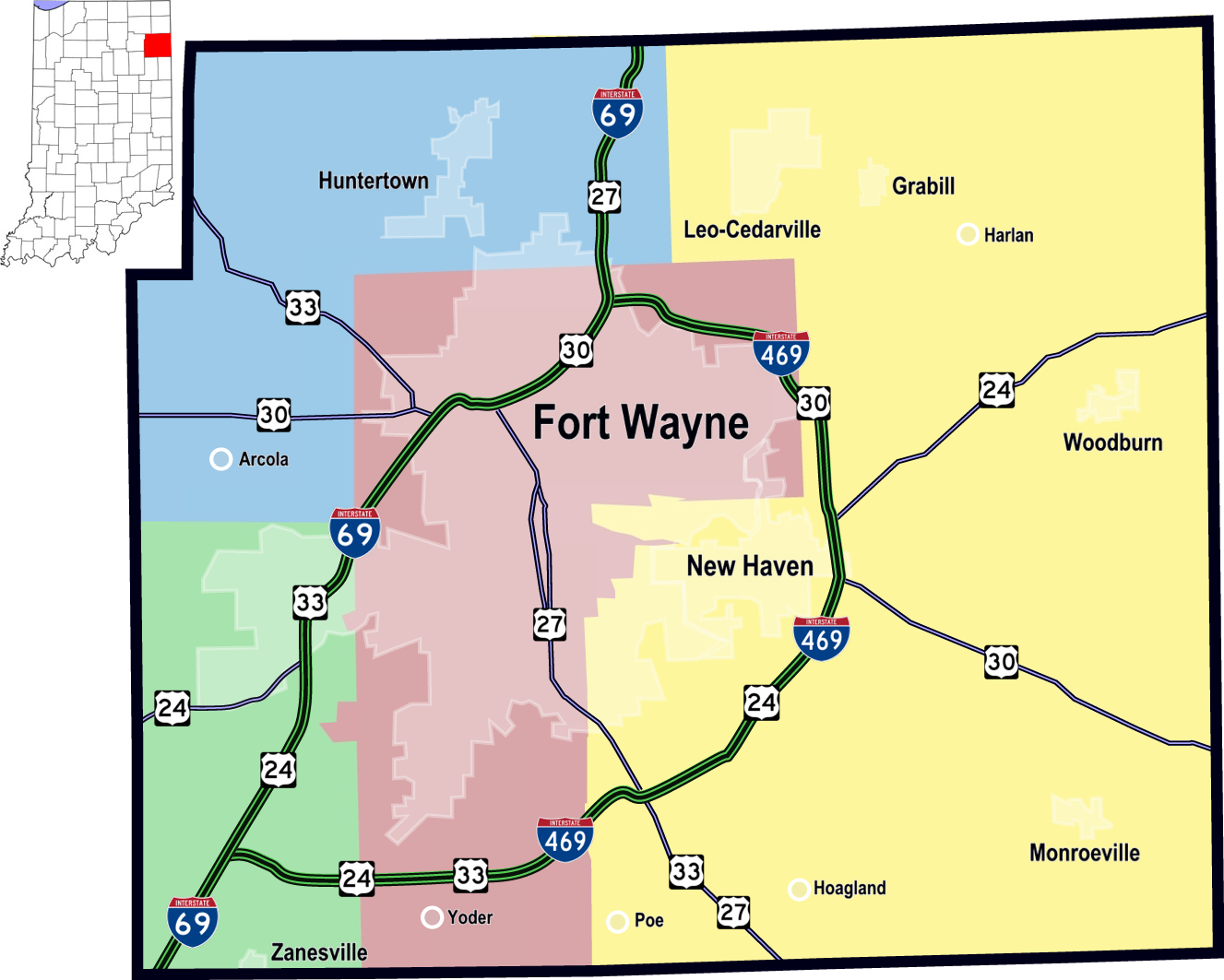
- The green area is the district in Allen County served by Southwest Allen County Schools.

Address
- 4824 Homestead Rd; Fort Wayne, IN 46814 Allen County; United States

District information
- Type: Public
- Motto: Preparing today's learners for tomorrow's opportunities
- Grades: Pre-K–12
- Superintendent: Joshua D. St. John
- Schools: 6 Elementary, 2 Middle, 1 High, 1 Virtual
- Budget: $88.81 million
- NCES District ID: 1800030

Students and staff
- Students: ~7,850
- Teachers: 458
- Staff: 384
- Student–teacher ratio: 17.15

Other information
- Website: www.sacs.k12.in.us

Southwest Allen County Schools (SACS) is a school district in Indiana serving the townships of Aboite and Lafayette in Allen County, including the areas incorporated into Fort Wayne.

SACS has six elementary schools, two middle schools, one high school, and one virtual school serving middle- and high-school students. Its current superintendent is Joshua D. St. John. Elementary students are sometimes taken on field trips to Center School, a historic one-room schoolhouse and the chief symbol of the district, and may also visit the Allen County Courthouse, in order to learn about their local judiciary system.

== Schools ==
=== High school ===
- Homestead High School

=== Middle schools ===
- Summit Middle School
- Woodside Middle School

=== Elementary schools ===
- Aboite Elementary School
- Covington Elementary School
- Deer Ridge Elementary School
- Haverhill Elementary School
- Lafayette Meadows Elementary School
- Whispering Meadows Elementary School

== See also ==
- List of school districts in Indiana
