= Hursh Road Bridge =

- Hursh Road Bridge (Bridge No. 38)
- Formerly listed on the U.S. National Register of Historic Places
- Location within Indiana Location within the United States
- Location: West of Cedarville on Hursh Road, near Leo-Cedarville, Indiana
- Coordinates: 41°12′55″N 85°03′05″W
- Area: less than one acre
- Built: 1879
- Built by: Olds, C. I.; Wheelock, A.
- Architectural style: Pratt (Whipple)through Truss
- NRHP reference No.: 81000025

Significant dates
- Added to NRHP: June 4, 1981
- Removed from NRHP: May 25, 1993

Hursh Road Bridge (Bridge No. 38) was a historic Whipple truss bridge spanning Cedar Creek near Leo-Cedarville, Indiana. It was built in 1879 by the Western Bridge Works of Fort Wayne. It was a 120 foot long, 16 feet wide ornate iron bridge.

It was added to the National Register of Historic Places in 1981 and delisted in 1993.
