= Fisher West Farm =

- U.S. National Register of Historic Places
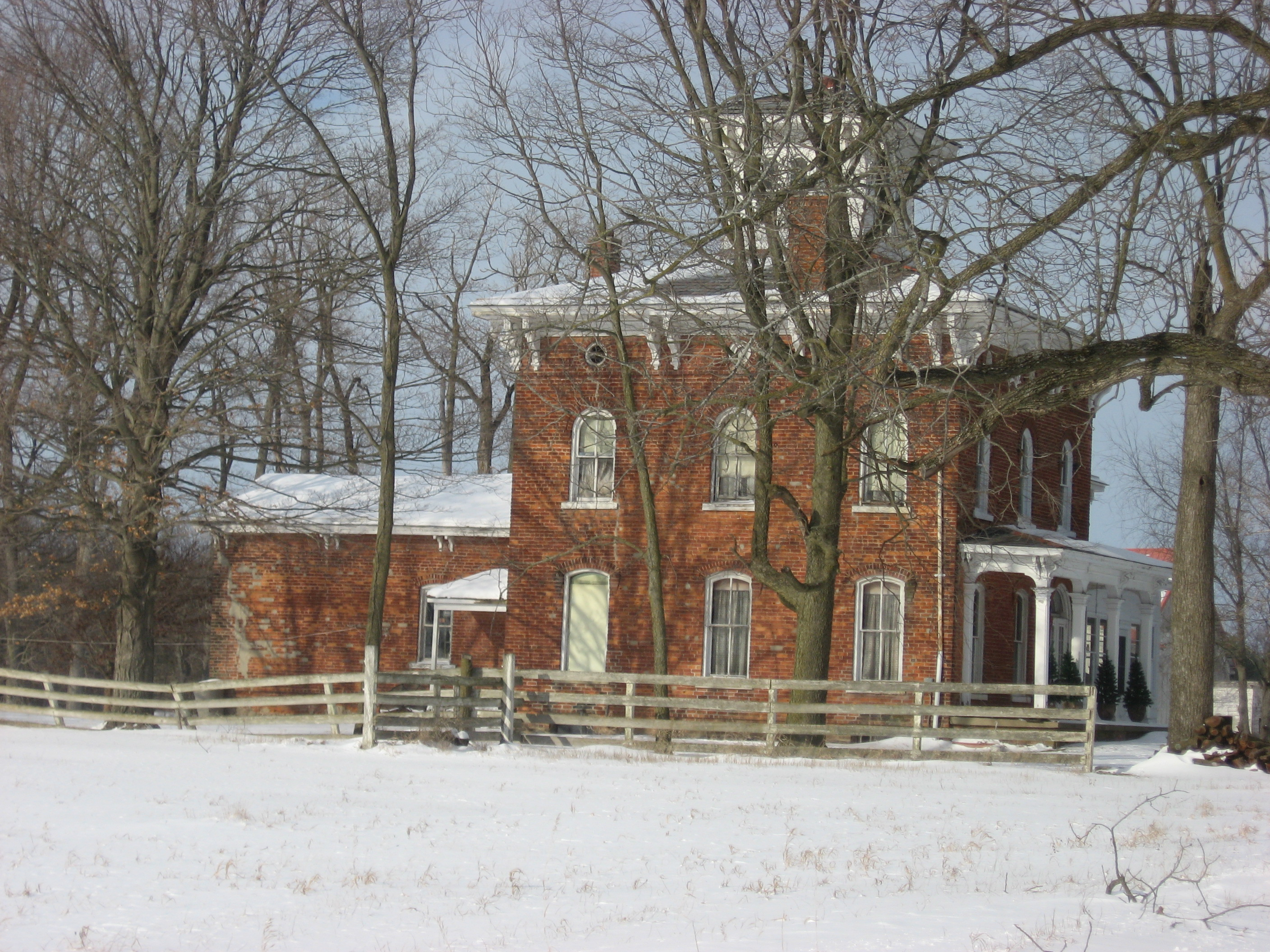
- Fisher West Farmhouse, January 2014

- Location within Indiana Location within the United States
- Location: 17935 West Rd., northeast of Huntertown, Perry Township, Allen County, Indiana
- Coordinates: 41°15′5″N 85°9′11″W
- Area: 4 acres (1.6 ha)
- Built: c. 1860
- Architectural style: Italianate
- NRHP reference No.: 85001193
- Added to NRHP: June 6, 1985

Fisher West Farm is a historic home and farm located in Perry Township, Allen County, Indiana. The farmhouse was built about 1860, and is a two-story, Italianate style brick dwelling. It consists of a two-story, main block topped by a low hipped roof and belvedere; a two-story hip roofed wing; and one story gabled kitchen wing. It features a full-width front porch. Also on the property are the contributing gabled rectangular bank barn and shed-roofed pump house.

It was listed on the National Register of Historic Places in 1985.
