= Five Points, Allen County, Indiana =

Five Points
- Unincorporated community
- Location within Indiana Location within the United States
- Coordinates: 41°07′24″N 84°55′31″W
- Country: United States
- State: Indiana
- County: Allen
- Township: Milan
- Elevation: 732 ft (223 m)
- Time zone: UTC-5 (Eastern (EST))
  - Summer (DST): UTC-4 (EDT)
- ZIP code: 46797
- Area code: 260
- GNIS feature ID: 434546

Five Points is an unincorporated community in Milan Township, Allen County, in the U.S. state of Indiana.

== History ==
Five Points is so named due to the fact that five different roads meet at one single point.
