= Milan Township, Allen County, Indiana =

Milan Township
- Township
- Location in Allen County, Indiana
- Coordinates: 41°08′17″N 84°56′54″W
- Country: United States
- State: Indiana
- County: Allen

Government
  - Type: Indiana township

Area
  - Total: 37.49 sq mi (97.09 km^{2})
  - Land: 37.18 sq mi (96.29 km^{2})
  - Water: 0.31 sq mi (0.80 km^{2}) 0.83%
- Elevation: 758 ft (231 m)

Population (2020)
  - Total: 3,891
  - Density: 101/sq mi (38.9/km^{2})
- ZIP codes: 46741, 46774, 46797, 46835
- GNIS feature ID: 0453624

Milan Township is one of twenty townships in Allen County, Indiana, United States. Milan Township is located in east central Allen County, with the Maumee River meandering across the township. As of the 2010 census, its population was 3,749. The township is highly rural, with only 1,137 houses in the 2010 census. Many of the residents of Milan Township are Swiss Amish who mostly speak a Low Alemannic Alsatian dialect. Milan township is generally demarcated by Schwartz Road to the west, Notestine Road to the north, Sampson Road to the east, and Gar Creek Road to the south.

== Towns and villages ==
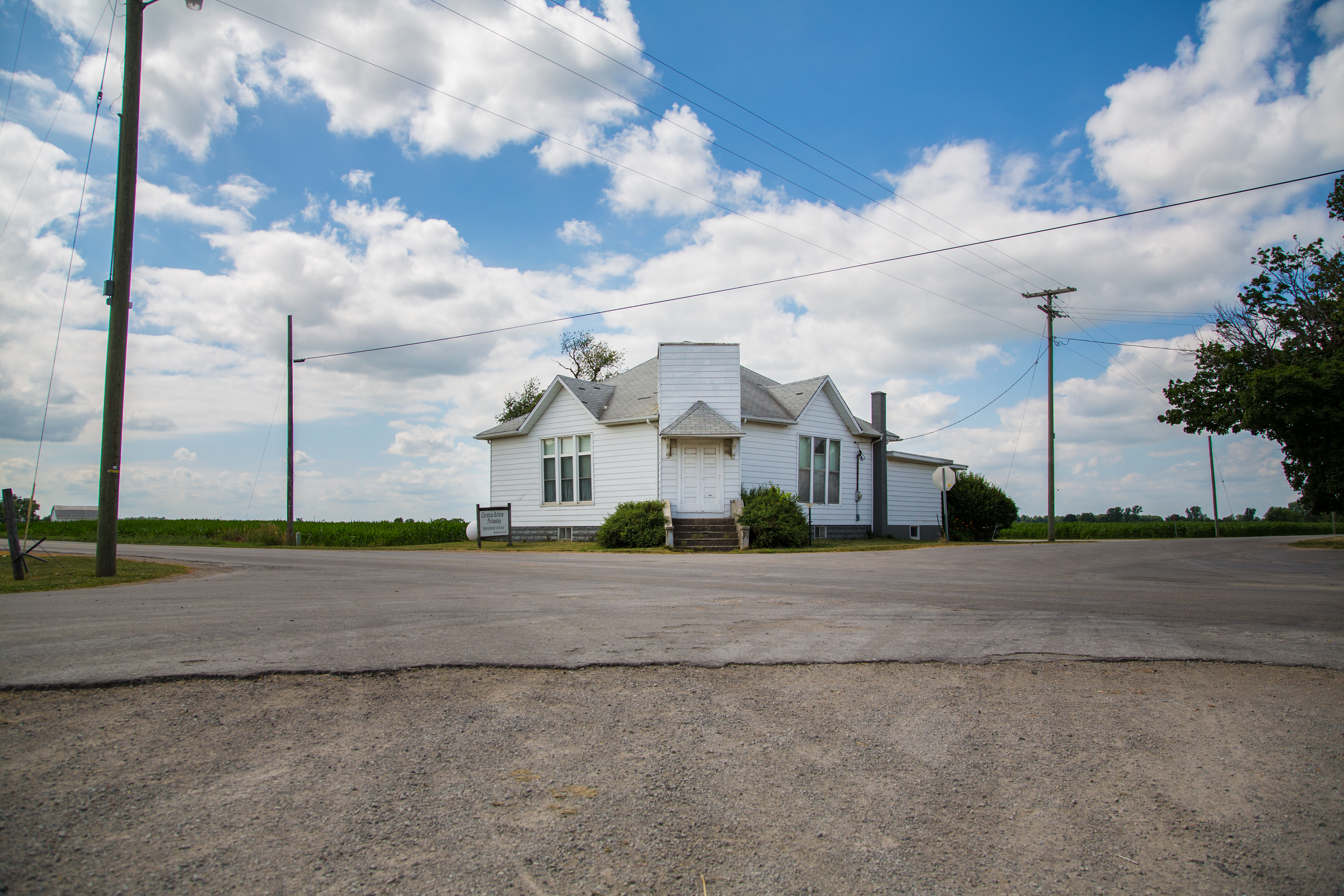
A church in Milan Center.

The principal town in Milan Township is Milan Center, at 41°8'39"N 84°56'46"W. Milan Center lies at the intersection of Milan Center Road and Doty Road, and at an earlier time consisted of Brueggemann's (previously Van Camp's, a combination lumberyard, gas station, hardware and grocery store), a small wood-frame church, Milan Center School, a feed mill, and four houses. Additional enterprises have come and gone through the years.

Five Points is a settlement located at the junction of Old US Highway 24, Webster Road, and Woodburn Road, along the old Wabash-Erie Canal route. At one time it consisted of a small diner for truckers, a gas station (later a bicycle shop), a tile mill, and a few homes. A newer water tower labeled "Woodlan" near the Woodlan Schools may result in the community being known as "Woodlan" in the coming years.

Gar Creek was once a shipping point on the Wabash and Toledo Railroad. A small community of 500 people eventually settled around the station. In 1883, lumber and grain were the primary exports of the station. Gar Creek enterprises at that time included a shingle manufacturer, two carpenters, a Justice of the Peace, a saw mill, a general store with a railway agent and a Postmaster (Jesse Rothgeb), a blacksmith, a hoop manufacturer, and United Brethren and Lutheran churches. The population at that time was listed as 130.

Thurman was a settlement located on the Detroit branch of the old Wabash Railroad. A few homes and businesses remain to this day. Parts of Thurman were incorporated into Fort Wayne on March 31, 2008 as part of the "Schwartz Road Voluntary Annexation".

== Woodlan Schools ==
The Maumee-Milan Consolidated School System (constituents: Maumee Township, including the city of Woodburn, and Milan Township) built and dedicated Woodlan High School for the 1959–1960 school year. Located in Milan Township, the school lies just east of Five Points on the Woodburn Road. Students previously attending Harlan High School began attending Woodlan in the autumn of 1965, as the area's smaller school districts had been further consolidated into the East Allen County Schools a year earlier. Junior high and elementary schools are also now located on the campus.

== Economy ==
The major industries in the county are agriculture, building trades, and rubber manufacturing. The largest employer in the township is BF Goodrich. The plant manufactures BF Goodrich and generic-branded tires for passenger cars and light trucks. BF Goodrich is a division of Michelin North America. As of 2016, 1,650 workers were employed at the facility located on Old U.S. Highway 24. Shortly after opening in 1961, the mile-long plant was featured in the national media as the "longest" manufacturing facility in the country at the time. It has been upgraded and expanded subsequently several times. The facility, which lies just east of the Woodlan Schools, comprises the highest-assessed real estate and business personal property value in the East Allen County Schools' territory. Many plant employees are represented by United Steelworkers Local 715.

== Laventure's Reserve ==
The indigenous inhabitants of Milan Township were the Algonquian-speaking Miami People. In the "Treaty with the Miami" executed on October 23, 1826, one section, 640 acres, of Milan Township land was reserved for "Laventure's daughter", whose father, Laventure Toucher, was a French trader and whose mother may have been a Miami.

Laventure Toucher had been convicted of treason by the British in Fort Detroit in 1779 during the Revolutionary War. The colonists had recruited neutral French inhabitants of the Detroit region to be spies and sympathizers for the American cause.

The reserved section occupied land bordered now by the Rohman and Platter roads. At the time of Indian Removal in 1846, those Miami who held separate allotments of land were allowed to stay as citizens in Indiana. Around 1872 the reserve was partially sold to non-native settlers, and by 1879, plat books were showing the "first family" Milan Township surnames of Lampe, Vondereau, Shafer, Bruick, Landin, and Yerks on that land.

Although the Indiana Miami were recognized by the US in an 1854 treaty, that recognition was stripped in 1897. While an Indiana Miami Nation still exists to this day, the officially US-recognized relocated Miami Nation resides in Oklahoma. In 1980, the Indiana legislature recognized the Indiana Miami and voted to support federal recognition.

== Early settlement prior to 1880 ==
Historical population
Census	Pop.	Note	%±
1930	1,524		—
1940	1,511		−0.9%
1950	1,623		7.4%
1960	1,942		19.7%
1970	2,335		20.2%
1980	3,178		36.1%
1990	3,165		−0.4%
2000	3,503		10.7%
2010	3,749		7.0%
2020	3,891		3.8%
US Census:

Milan Township was first organized by the County Commissioners in March, 1838, being petitioned for, and named by, resident Stephen Heath, in honor of Milan Township, Huron County, Ohio: his former home (the township now resides in neighboring Erie County). The origin of the "Milan" name in Huron and Erie Counties, Ohio remains obscure.

Charles Shriner erected the first frame house in 1838. It was attached to a log building. Alvin Hall erected the second frame house in 1841. William R. Herrick erected the first frame barn in the spring of 1850.

The first road was surveyed in 1840 by Horace Taylor. It was called the Ridge Road, and extended from Fort Wayne to Hicksville, Ohio. The first stores in the township were operated by Stephen Heath and Lorenzo D. George.

The first township election was held in April, 1842; Andrew Wakefield was elected Justice of the Peace, and John Nettle, Constable. The positions were voluntary, as there were no salaries.

Amish settlement began in 1852–1853, when eleven wagons carrying fifty-two people, mainly recent immigrants from the Alsace, migrated to Allen County from Stark County, Ohio. Peter Graber was the first bishop. Three distinct divisions subsequently evolved in the community: the most-conservative Old Order Amish, the more progressive Amish-Mennonites, and the most liberal, the "Defenseless" (Egli) Mennonites.

=== The Village of Fairport ===
The settlement of Fairport, the first village in the township, was created by Eastern venture capitalists attempting to capitalize on the newly created Wabash and Erie Canal. The first post office was established at Fairport in 1843, with John Irvin being appointed Postmaster. Fairport straddled portions of Township Sections 13 and 24, in the far eastern part of the township, just south of the Maumee River.

The heyday of the canal was 1847 to 1866, but the canal ultimately closed in 1878 as both shippers and passengers demonstrated a preference for utilizing the Wabash railroad instead, which had been built parallel to the canal. Fairport ultimately foundered as the canal foundered; the settlement became defunct and the site quickly reverted to farmland.

George Foxtater and John Irvin were the first tavern-keepers in the township, in Fairport.

=== Chamberlain Settlement ===
The village of Chamberlain arose when one of the first township settlers, Alvin Hall, requested that a post office be placed in the "western part of the township." The request was granted, and Lorenzo D. George became the appointed postmaster. Chamberlain, located just southwest of Barnett Chapel on the Old Ridge Road in Section 4 of the township, began its own decline around 1870, and the post office was relocated to St. Joseph Township at that time.

== One-room district schoolhouses ==
Support for rural public schools originated with the Federal Land Ordinance of 1785, which began the land surveys that laid out townships and sections across the growing nation. Every township was to consist of thirty-six sections containing 640 acres each. Section 16 and later, in 1848, section 36, were set aside to support schools. That ordinance largely failed in Indiana, but a few townships actually did use their surveyed "Section 16's" for educational purposes, as prescribed in the ordinance.

Following statehood in 1816, the Indiana General Assembly then passed a complex series of acts (in 1824, 1849, and 1852) to organize and develop the public school system at the state, county, and township levels. School districts were created and given the authority to establish district schools at the township level. School district representatives were to be elected to the township trustees. State and local tax-support was provided on a county-by-county basis.

A number of schoolhouses were then built soon following 1852, but the majority were ultimately constructed following the Civil War. By 1900, over 8,000 one-room schools stood statewide. Later, with changes in demographics and the onset of school consolidations, the General Assembly gave the State Superintendent the means to close districts where attendance was under 12 pupils. Today there are over 700 surviving one-room schoolhouse structures in Indiana; the majority of these date from 1865 to 1900.

Milan Township had at least 13 "District" schools.

What was to become "District School No. 1" was actually the first school constructed in the township. It opened in a log building in 1845; the first teacher was Catherine Shell. The structure was replaced by a frame building in 1857 when it officially became a District School. That building was erected by Alvin Hall, who was the first carpenter in the township.

No. 1	13903 Maysville Road, the "Kurtz School"	closed b. 1923
No. 2	Graber Rd. in Section 6, E.-side, the "Hall School"	closed aft.1903
No. 3	Parent Rd. W. of Ricker Rd., N.-side	closed aft.1903
No. 4	Parent Rd. at S. apex of Laventure's Reserve (at creek/mill, N.-side).	closed aft.1903
No. 5	Milan Center School, also the Township High School and "Professor Harris' School", Milan Center Rd. at Doty Rd.	closed in 1974
No. 6	17985 Darling Rd. at Brush College Rd., the "Detrick School"	closed aft. 1945
No. 7	Brush College Rd. at Doty Rd., the "Brush College School"	closed b. 1923
No. 8	Berthaud Rd and Gar Creek Rd., NE corner. The "Busse Schoolhouse".	closed in 1903
No. 9	at Five Points, W. of Webster Rd. and N. of the canal. The "Platter Schoolhouse"	closed b. 1897
No 10	Schwartz Rd. in Section 6	closed b. 1897
No.11	near Woodburn Rd. and Roussey Rd., the "Garver School"	closed aft. 1940
No.12	"old" and "new" schoolhouses were at 9127 & 9130 Ricker Road, S. of Notestine, "Fitzgerald's School"	closed aft. 1940
No.13	Bremer Rd. W. of Roussey Rd., N.-side	closed aft. 1923

While "Brush College" appears to have been a popular designation at the time (i.e., the term was also used in Cedar Creek Township and in Huntington County), some muse that this one-room district schoolhouse in the "brushy woods" may have been a site to train teachers.

== Cholera, malaria, and smallpox ==
While all of these diseases are unheard of in the township today, each of these potentially life-ending scourges touched Milan Township at an earlier time. Groundbreaking on the Wabash and Erie Canal was 1832, and the canal was ultimately finished in 1856. Along the way to completion, it was said that a construction worker died from either cholera or malaria for every 6 feet of the canal being built. The length of the canal was 452 miles, from Toledo, OH to Evansville, IN.

In November 1899 an epidemic of smallpox was "prevailing in Milan Township", according to a Fort Wayne Journal-Gazette article from the time. A cluster of cases six miles southeast of Maysville "in a heavily populated area" was described, apparently stretching to the Ohio Line. Homes of infected individuals were placed under total police-supervised quarantine and all individuals exposed to those cases were placed under quarantine. Milan Center School was ordered by the health department to be closed until the threat of contagion had passed. Of interesting note was a particular smallpox-associated odor which could be detected outside each of the infected households.

== Iron span bridges ==
There are only two bridges spanning the Maumee River in Milan Township. The following original iron bridges have both been replaced with reinforced concrete structures.

=== Platter's Ford Bridge ===
On July 1, 1876, the County Commissioners announced they were letting bids for the first township bridge to be built, at "Platter's Ford". On August 15, the bid for the foundation was awarded to Chas. Bosseker & Co. Nine additional bids for the iron supra-structure were also unsealed at the time. In 1896 (and at several times following), a driftwood dam almost destroyed the completed structure, which was described as having two 100-ft long iron spans suspended on a huge center pier.

=== Schlink Farm Bridge ===
It took residents multiple attempts over a four-period, petitioning County Commissioners, in order for the Schlink Bridge to be built. Finally in 1906, the Commissioners met with residents on the site at the Schlink Farm to review the proposal, and it was thereafter finally agreed that the county would spend $15,000 to construct the iron bridge. The bridge on the Bruick Road is now a vital link connecting US Hwy 24 to northern township areas across the river.

== Cutting-edge mid-20th century technology ==
In the mid-20th century, telephone communication across relatively short distances could be prohibitively expensive. Northern Milan township had traditionally been served by the Harlan telephone exchange, and southern Milan township by the New Haven telephone exchange. To make a call between differing exchanges, one could incur so-called "long distance" surcharges. Brueggemann's store at Milan Center served as a progressive business and community center by having telephones from both exchanges. The New Haven telephone exchange was purchased by the Home Telephone company in Fort Wayne, which was itself subsequently acquired by General Telephone of Indiana. The Harlan telephone company was also eventually acquired by General Telephone of Indiana. General Telephone is now a part of Verizon.

== Geology ==
May Sand and Gravel once operated a stone quarry located along Old US 24, across from the BF Goodrich tire plant. Core samples were collected by researchers Doheny, Droste, and Shaver from the Indiana Geological Survey and Indiana University in 1975. The researchers catalogued a stratum of fossil sediment containing dolomite (calcium magnesium carbonate) and subsequently described its distribution from an origin in Northwestern Indiana, through veins to northeastern Indiana with varying thickness, erosion, and displacement by other strata along the way. Termed the "Milan Center Dolomite Member", the name was taken from "Milan Center Township"[sic], in which the Woodburn Quarry was located. This Milan Center Member was classified to be "Eifelian" in age.

In later prehistory and into the frontier days, Milan Township laid nearly entirely within the far western area of a glacial valley described today as the Great Black Swamp. Then in the 19th century, its wetlands were drained for travel, settlement, and agriculture. Stands of old-growth forests were felled and used for timber interests upon settlement. The Great Black Swamp extended eastward and downward from the old "Ridge Road," which is now Maysville Road.

The Maumee River flows through the township in a northeast course, and Twelve Mile and Ten Mile Creeks flow through the central part, joining the Maumee. Six Mile Creek drains the southwestern part of the township.

== Geography ==
According to the United States Census Bureau, Milan Township covers an area of 37.49 square miles (97.09 km^{2}); of this, 37.18 square miles (96.29 km^{2}) is land and 0.31 square miles (0.80 km^{2}), or 0.83%, is water.

=== Unincorporated towns ===
- Five Points at 41.123382°N 84.940244°W
- Milan Center at 41.144216°N 84.946077°W
- Thurman at 41.121308°N 85.0019815°W
- Gar Creek at 41.094751°N 84.952513°W

(This list is based on USGS data and may include former settlements.)

=== Adjacent townships ===
- Springfield Township (northeast)
- Maumee Township (east)
- Jackson Township (southeast)
- Jefferson Township (south)
- Adams Township (southwest)
- St. Joseph Township (west)
- Cedar Creek Township (northwest)

== Locations of interest ==
=== Cemeteries ===
- Amish Cemetery, located at 14702 Doty Road, behind the Amish School, about a half mile west of Milan Center.
- Barnett Chapel Cemetery, located on the northwest corner of State Road 37 (Maysville Turnpike) and Barnett Road. Lutheran. Earliest date 1875.
- Gar Creek Union Cemetery, located on the Gar Creek Road, 0.3 miles east of the Berthaud Road. Private. Earliest date December 23, 1884.
- Irving Family Cemetery, located on the south bank of the Maumee River, north of the B.F. Goodrich Tire Plant, on U.S. 24, on Goodrich land. Earliest date 1847.
- Platter Family Cemetery, located 0.2 miles south of the Platter Bridge on the northeast bank of the Maumee River. One stone: 1852.
- Saint Paul's Lutheran Cemetery at Gar Creek, located next to the church on Berthaud Road, about 0.2 miles south of Bremer Road. Earliest date 1884.
- Schwartz Family Cemetery, located on the north side of Irving Road 0.1 mile east of the Bruick Road. Amish. No markers.

From the Allen County INGenWeb Project

=== Historically significant churches ===
The first township religious meeting was held at Catherine Shell's Ridge Road log schoolhouse, in 1845. Services were conducted by the Rev. True Pattee, affiliated with the M. E. Church. The district schools were the first meeting places of various religious denominations, as no township church buildings were erected prior to 1880.

- Milan Evangelical Lutheran Church (Barnett Chapel) and Cemetery at State Road 37 and Barnett Road. Organized in 1864. Merged with St. Mark's Lutheran Church, Harlan (Springfield Township) in 1921. Now part of Holy Trinity Lutheran Church (see Springfield Township).
- St. Paul's Evangelical Lutheran Church-Gar Creek and Cemetery at 1910 N. Berthaud Road. Organized in 1880 by members of Emanuel Evangelical Lutheran Church, New Haven. Birth, baptism, confirmation, marriage and death records exist since 1880. Early records in German. Records have been photocopied and are available at the Allen County Public Library.
- Milan Center Methodist Protestant Church at the corner of Doty and Milan Center Roads. Organized in 1905/06 when a series of meetings were held in the old Milan Center schoolhouse. Land was donated and construction on the church was begun in 1906. Church disbanded sometime after 1954. Records may be located at the DePauw University Library, Greencastle, IN. The church building has been utilized by various congregations since.
- The Gar Creek Mennonite Church is also now defunct. In about 1854, Mennonites first settled at Gar Creek, a village 11 miles (18 km) northeast of Fort Wayne, Indiana. Among them Michael Rothgeb, Abram and Jacob Bixler, John Federspiel, Hezekiah Rothgeb, and Nancy Lowery. Services were held in Bethel Chapel, a union building. There was no resident minister. Eli Stoffer, a minister in the Hudson (Indiana) congregation, and others conducted occasional services. In 1900 there were 20 members. After the establishing of the Fort Wayne Mission in 1903, the mission workers assumed responsibility for the services at Gar Creek. On 22 October 1905 the building was rededicated for church services. Regular services were discontinued about 1910.

From the Allen County INGenWeb Project

=== Other historically significant structures and sites ===
Lengacher-Sapp Farm	17116 Notestine Road	Vernacular
Christan Lengacher Farm	10220 Thimlar Road	1910 Foursquare, two gambrel roof barns
Lake-Lengacher Farm	15329 State Road 37	c. 1870 Vernacular Gabled Ell
Swifts-Werts Farm	15039 State Road 37	c. 1880 Italianate house, Gable barn
Harp-Graber Farm	14510 Notestine Road	Vernacular Gabled Ell and timber-pegged house
John Graber Farm	10108 Graber Road	c. 1890 Vernacular Gabled Ell brick line
John Bertsch Farm	9842 Graber Road	c. 1870 Vernacular Gabled Ell log
Peter Graber, Sr House	9905 Graber Road	c. 1860 I-house log
Christian Richer Farm	9921 Ricker Road	c. 1855 Vernacular log
J. E. Motherwell Farm	9633 Ricker Road	c. 1860 Vernacular log
School No 12 (original)	9127 Ricker Road	c. 1870 Vernacular
William Fitzgerald, Sr Farm	9127 Ricker Road	c. 1870 Timber Frame w/ Greek Revival details
Township	School No. 12 30 Ricker Road	1899 Romanesque Revival
Yoder-Ringgenberger-Graber Farm	8917 Graber Road	c. 1855 Vernacular
John Graber Farm	8918 Graber Road	c. 1910 Vernacular gabled ell timber-pegged barn
Summers-Bottern-Graber Farm	8604 Graber Road	Brick-lined house, hand-hewn log barn
Milan Township School No. 1	13903 Maysville Road	1882 Vernacular
Chamberlain Settlement	State Road 37 at Bruick Road	c. 1850
Henry Kurtz House	14106 State Road 37 East	c. 1925 Craftsman bungalow
John Kurtz Farm	14212 State Road 37 East	c. 1914 Foursquare
Barnett Chapel Lutheran Cemetery	14441 State Road 37 East	1875
M. Sowers House	14441 State Road 37 East	c. 1850 Greek Revival
Joe Miller Farm & Harness Shop	76212 Darling Road	c. 1910 Vernacular gabled ell of tile block
Noah Miller Farm	16315 Darling Road	c. 1855 Vernacular log house, German four-bay barn
Township School No. 6	17985 Darling Road	c. 1880 Other
W. A. Ward House	18928 Ward Road	c. 1910 Colonial Revival
A. Devauz Farm	7913 Brush College Road	c. 1905 East Lake
Wm. F. Ehle Farm	15729 Ehle Road	Rebuilt 1926 House; 1880s Craftsman house, early gabled barn
John Thimlar Farm	15001 Ehle Road	c. 1860 Vernacular Log House
George Washington T. Safford Farm	7907 Bruick Road	c. 1878 Victorian Gothic
Thoddeus B. Stene Farm	13515 State Road 37	c. 1870 Vernacular Upright and Wing
Daniel D. Miller Farm	12914 State Road 37	c. 1865 Vernacular timber-pegged
Knight-Miller Farm	12810 State Road 37	Vernacular timber-pegged I house
Absolom Stateufer Farm	12610 Doty Road	c. 1880 Italianate
David Schwartz Farm	14030 Doty Road	c. 1875 Vernacular gabled ell
Milan Township Amish School	14083 Doty Road	c. 1950 Vernacular
Wm. A. Spindler Farm	14201 Doty Road	c. 1875 Victorian Gothic
George G. Nuttle Farm	14802 Doty Road	c. 1875 Vernacular: I House
J. M. Yerkes Farm	15208 Doty Road	c. 1890 House estate
Milan Center School	Doty Road at Milan Center Road	c. 1899 Romanesque Revival
Milan Center Methodist Church	NW Corner Milan Center & Doty Road	c. 1901
Brueggemann's General Store	15303 Doty Road	c. 1924 2-story, 1928 Craftsman
Milan Center Feed Mill	15402 Doty Road	c. 1946 other
Theodore Thimlar House	16026 Doty Road	c. 1892 Italianate
Milan Township School No. 7	Doty Road at Brush College (NE corner)	1902 Classical Revival
Canal Tavern House	19524 U.S. 24	c. 1850 Vernacular log
Irving Family Cemetery	18907 E. U.S. 24	c. 1847
Fairport Settlement	Old U.S. 24 A/C from Goodrich Uniroyal Plant (N-side)	1837
Sanford A. Ransom Farm	6034 Milan Center Road	c. 1870 Vernacular vertical plank-lined
Christian Schwartz Farm a	14422 Irving Road	c. 1870 Vernacular I house
John Schwartz Farm	14218 Irving Road	1870 Vernacular I house
Schwartz Family Cemetery	13935 Irving Road	19th century-early 20th century
J. J. Schwartz Farm	5229-35 Bruick Road	c. 1870 Vernacular log
Platter Family Cemetery	S. of Webster Road E. of Maumee River	c. 1852
Summerset (town)	S. Bank of Maumee River near Webster Road	
Shaney Brooks (or local surname Shanebrook?) Gas Station	16800 E. Woodburn Road	c. 1920 Craftsman
Five Points/Canal Turnaround	US 24 at Webster & Woodburn Road.	1920 Craftsman
Henry Busche Farm	4029 Sampson Road	c. 1870 Vernacular log
Peter Schaaf Farm	3637 Webster Road	c. 1872 Victorian Gothic
William P. Bruick Farm	15019 Parent Road	c. 1870 Vernacular gabled ell
George Peter Schlink Farm	14218 Parent Road	1879 Italianate
Hemsoth-Metert Farm	12830 Stellhorn Road	c. 1870 Queen Anne
Hemrich Nietert Farm	3534 Ricker Road	1885 Italianate
Wm. Schafer Farm	3814 Ricker Road	1875 Vernacular wing, gabled front
Gottlieb Schafer Barn & Outbuildings	12015 Stellhorn Road	1893 1893 Bank barn
Henry Meyer Farm	11604 Stellhorn Road	1875 Vernacular: I house
Village of Thurman	10800 E Stellhorn Road at 4400 N Thurman, E to RR tracks	Early 20th-century village
H. Kuehn Farm	10930 Stellhorn Road	Vernacular
Vonderau Farm	3714 Thurman Road	c. 1910 Dutch Colonial Revival
Bowers Mill	11500 Parent Road at bridge (N-side)	c. 1861 Vernacular water-powered mill
Henry Nahrwold Farm	11013 Parent Road	1875 Vernacular gabled Front
Lapp-Vonderau Farm	11102 Stellhorn Road	1900 Victorian Gothic
Young-Hermann Farm	11418 Parent Road	1890 East Lake
Heinrich Bischoff Farm	11618 Parent Road	c. 1880 Queen Anne
Hiram Parent Farm	12808 Parent Road	c. 1875 Italianate
John Harper Farm	13086 Bremer Road	1870 Vernacular gabled ell
Charles Hockemeyer Farm	14216 Bremer Road	1911–12 Classical Revival
State Paul's Lutheran Church Cemetery	1910 Berthaud Road	
Herman & Christine Meyer Farm	15503 Gar Creek Road	p. 1900 Foursquare with Colonial Revival detail
Bowers-Harris Farm	7034 Thimlar Road	1929 Sears Roebuck mail-order catalog barn
Gar Creek Union Cemetery	15715 Gar Creek Road	
Mosler Village	17703 Bremer Road N. of RR Tracks and Road	1854
Gar Creek Settlement	16221 Gar Creek Road	

Table originally from Rootsweb and the Allen County INGenWeb Project

=== Major highways ===
- I-469 (Ronald Reagan Expressway)
- US 24
- SR 37

=== Airports and landing strips ===
- Airpark Field

== Notable people ==
John Chapman, "Johnny Appleseed" (1774–1845) Itinerant Swedenborgian missionary, nurseryman. At the time of his death, operated a 15,000-apple-tree nursery in Milan township. Buried in Archer Park, Fort Wayne.

== School districts ==
- East Allen County Schools

== Political districts ==
- Indiana's 3rd congressional district
- State House District 79
- State House District 85
- State Senate District 14
