= Cedar Creek Township, Allen County, Indiana =

Cedar Creek Township
- Township
- Location in Allen County, Indiana
- Coordinates: 41°13′29″N 85°01′00″W
- Country: United States
- State: Indiana
- County: Allen

Government
  - Type: Indiana township

Area
  - Total: 35.67 sq mi (92.38 km^{2})
  - Land: 34.47 sq mi (89.28 km^{2})
  - Water: 1.19 sq mi (3.09 km^{2}) 3.35%
- Elevation: 791 ft (241 m)

Population (2020)
  - Total: 13,684
  - Density: 396.9/sq mi (153.2/km^{2})
- ZIP codes: 46706, 46741, 46765, 46788, 46825, 46835, 46845
- GNIS feature ID: 0453170

Cedar Creek Township is one of twenty townships in Allen County, Indiana, United States. As of the 2020 census, its population was 13,684.

== Geography ==
According to the United States Census Bureau, Cedar Creek Township covers an area of 35.67 square miles (92.38 km^{2}); of this, 34.47 square miles (89.28 km^{2}) is land and 1.19 square miles (3.09 km^{2}), or 3.35 percent, is water.

=== Cities, towns, villages ===
- Grabill
- Leo-Cedarville

=== Unincorporated towns ===
- Hursh at 41.248105°N 84.974134°W

(This list is based on USGS data and may include former settlements.)

=== Adjacent townships ===
- Jackson Township, DeKalb County (north)
- Spencer Township, DeKalb County (northeast)
- Springfield Township (east)
- Milan Township (southeast)
- St. Joseph Township (southwest)
- Perry Township (west)
- Butler Township, DeKalb County (northwest)

=== Cemeteries ===
The township contains these three cemeteries: Saint Michaels, Schlatter and Yaggy.

=== Major highways ===
- SR 1

=== Rivers ===
- St. Joseph River

=== Lakes ===
- Cedarville Reservoir
- Viberg Lake

== School districts ==
- East Allen County Schools

== Political districts ==
- Indiana's 3rd congressional district
- State House District 85
- State Senate District 14
