= Brotherhood Mutual Insurance Company =

American insurance company

Brotherhood Mutual
- Type: Mutual
- Industry: Insurance
- Headquarters: Fort Wayne, Indiana United States
- Key people: Mark Robison (Chairman, President and CEO)
- Products: Church/Ministry Insurance
- Revenue: $393.8 million USD of Earned Premium (YE 2018)
- Number of employees: Approximately 700 (YE 2025)
- Website: www.brotherhoodmutual.com

Brotherhood Mutual Insurance Company is an American insurance company primarily serving churches and related institutions (such as Christian schools, camps, colleges). They are the second-largest U.S. provider of property and casualty insurance to Christian churches and related ministries. Their corporate headquarters is in Fort Wayne, Indiana. They were founded in 1917 by a group of evangelical Mennonites.

Brotherhood Mutual provides insurance to more than 60,000 customers throughout the United States. Types of insurance provided include property, liability, commercial auto, workers' compensation, and travel. They also provide payroll services and travel assistance services to churches, Christian schools, camps, colleges, nonprofits, and missions. Brotherhood Mutual is rated B++ (Good) by A.M. Best and A− (Sound Financial Condition) by Kroll Bond Rating Agency (KBRA)

== Controversy ==
In 2007, Brotherhood Mutual denied coverage to the West Adrian United Church of Christ in Michigan, citing higher risks due to the church's endorsement of gay marriage
