= MedPro Group =

Medical malpractice insurance company

MedPro Group, formerly known as The Medical Protective Company, is a Berkshire Hathaway company and a provider of healthcare liability (medical malpractice) insurance in the United States. MedPro provides malpractice insurance, claims, and risk cover to physicians, surgeons, dentists and other healthcare professionals, as well as hospitals, senior care and other healthcare facilities. Additionally, MedPro provides insurance to international markets, liability insurance to other professionals, and specialized accident and health insurance to colleges and other businesses through its subsidiaries and other Berkshire Hathaway affiliates. MedPro is based in Fort Wayne, Indiana. MedPro's insurance policies are distributed primarily through a nationwide network of appointed agents and brokers and supplemented by the selective use of managing general underwriters, as well as wholesale and direct channels.

While the majority of MedPro's business is in the United States, MedPro also sells to healthcare providers and institutions in international markets through Berkshire Hathaway affiliates. MedPro also sells liability cover to professionals in fields beyond healthcare and offers specialized health insurance to colleges and other customers. These products are administered by MedPro and underwritten by Berkshire Hathaway affiliates, including Berkshire Hathaway International Insurance Limited, Berkshire Hathaway European Insurance DAC and National Liability & Fire Insurance Company, AttPro RRG Reciprocal Risk Retention Group, and the Wellfleet insurance companies.

== History ==
MedPro Group traces its roots back to a predecessor company, the Physicians’ Guarantee Company. Alpheus P. Buchman, MD and Miles F. Porter, MD, both of Fort Wayne, Indiana, formed the Physicians' Guarantee Company in 1899 to provide pre-paid legal service for medical malpractice lawsuits. The company is considered one of the first companies to offer pre-paid legal service in the United States. In 1902, Physicians’ Guarantee Company changed its name to the Physicians’ Defense Company. In 1907, Byron H. Somers and Charles M. Niezer left the Physicians Defense Company and founded The Medical Protective Company and in 1913, Medical Protective acquired Physicians Defense Company. Byron Somers and his descendants ran Medical Protective until 1998 when General Electric purchased the company. In 2005, Warren Buffett's Berkshire Hathaway purchased the company for $825 million.

== Key dates ==
1899 – Recognizing that healthcare providers are increasingly being sued, Dr. Alpheus P. Buchman and others create Physicians' Guarantee Company (PGC) to provide pre-paid legal service coverage.

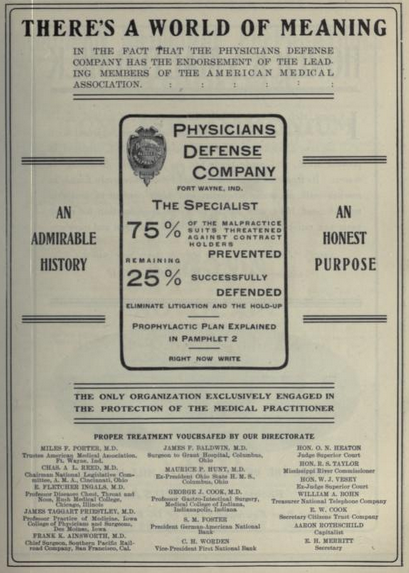
Physician Defense Company (1906)

1902 – PGC changes its name to Physicians' Defense Company (PDC), with Dr. Miles F. Porter as President, and Dr. Charles A.L. Reed (President of the AMA) on the board of directors.

1907 – Medical Protective is founded by Byron H. Somers and Charles M. Niezer and offers pre-paid legal service coverage to healthcare providers.

1910 – Medical Protective expands coverage to include indemnity coverage. Medical Protective offers medical professional liability insurance policies with limits of $5,000/$15,000 for $15 a year.

1913 – PDC merges with Medical Protective.

1920s – Byron H. Somers leads Medical Protective and the company becomes the largest insurer of healthcare providers in 17 states.

1930s – Medical Protective introduces a much broader coverage policy and helps shape the defense of medical practitioners; provides the first "medmal bible" to the industry, named "Brief on Malpractice Law."

1940s – Medical Protective defends well over 50,000 claims and provides physicians and dentists with continued coverage during their World War II military service.

1950s – Medical Protective begins insuring residents and interns during their training.

1960s – Medical Protective begins to expand coverage and increase limits and continues its national leadership position.

1970s – Medical Protective is one of the few carriers to survive the increasing number of medical malpractice suits that results in the industry's "first crisis."

1990s – Focusing on the continuum of care, Medical Protective begins to insure small and community-based hospitals.

1998 – General Electric purchases Medical Protective and expands coverage countrywide.

2005 – Medical Protective is purchased from GE by Warren Buffett's Berkshire Hathaway. Insureds have the long-term confidence that comes from being with Fortune Magazine's "World's Most Admired Insurer."

2012 – MedPro Group acquires New Jersey–based Princeton Insurance.

2014 – MedPro Group expands internationally. Begins writing in the United Kingdom and eventually elsewhere in Europe and Asia.

2015 – MedPro acquires Oklahoma-based PLICO.

2016 – Wellfleet (formerly known as CHP) re-aligned under MedPro. Two accident and health insurance carrier companies, Commercial Casualty Insurance Co. (CCIC) and Atlanta International Insurance Co. (AIIC), were renamed Wellfleet Insurance Company and Wellfleet New York Insurance Company, respectively.
