= National Register of Historic Places listings in Whitley County, Indiana =

Location of Whitley County in Indiana

This is a list of the National Register of Historic Places listings in Whitley County, Indiana.

This is intended to be a complete list of the properties and districts on the National Register of Historic Places in Whitley County, Indiana, United States. Latitude and longitude coordinates are provided for many National Register properties and districts; these locations may be seen together in a map.

There are six properties and districts listed on the National Register in the county.

Properties and districts located in incorporated areas display the name of the municipality, while properties and districts in unincorporated areas display the name of their civil township. Properties and districts split between multiple jurisdictions display the names of all jurisdictions.

This National Park Service list is complete through NPS recent listings posted January 2, 2026.

== Current listings ==
	Name on the Register	Image	Date listed	Location	City or town	Description
1	Blue Bell Inc., Factory Building		March 7, 2018 (#100002184)	307 S. Whitley St. 41°09′15″N 85°29′08″W	Columbia City	
2	Columbia City Historic District	Columbia City Historic District	June 22, 1987 (#87001307)	Roughly bounded by Jefferson, Walnut, Ellsworth, Wayne, and N. Chauncy Sts. 41°09′29″N 85°29′20″W	Columbia City	
3	Thomas R. Marshall House	Thomas R. Marshall House	July 21, 1983 (#83000046)	108 W. Jefferson St. 41°09′33″N 85°29′20″W	Columbia City	
4	Dr. Christopher Souder House	Dr. Christopher Souder House	April 20, 2005 (#05000315)	214 W. Main St. 41°10′41″N 85°37′39″W	Larwill	
5	South Whitley Historic District		December 7, 2017 (#100001881)	Roughly bounded by Broad, Calhoun, Wayne, and Line Sts. 41°05′10″N 85°37′41″W	South Whitley	
6	Whitley County Courthouse	Whitley County Courthouse	February 16, 1979 (#79000029)	Van Buren and Main Sts. 41°09′23″N 85°29′21″W	Columbia City	

== See also ==
- List of National Historic Landmarks in Indiana
- National Register of Historic Places listings in Indiana
- Listings in neighboring counties: Allen, Huntington, Kosciusko, Wabash
- List of Indiana state historical markers in Whitley County
