= Columbia City High School =

Location
- 1600 S State Road 9 Columbia City, Whitley County, Indiana 46725; United States; 41.1388°N 85.4844°W

Information
- Type: Public high school
- Motto: United We Soar!
- Established: 1889
- School district: Whitley County Consolidated Schools
- Principal: Braden Mullett
- Faculty: 71
- Teaching staff: 75.67 (FTE)
- Grades: 9-12
- Enrollment: 1,174 (2023-2024)
- Student to teacher ratio: 15.51
- Color
- Athletics conference: Northeast Eight Conference
- Team name: Eagles
- Rival: Whitko High School
- Website: Official Website

Columbia City High School is a public high school located in Columbia City, Indiana.

== Notable alumni ==
- Jim Banks - U.S. Senator for Indiana
- Cleon H. Foust - Thirty-second Indiana Attorney General
- Ralph F. Gates - 37th governor of Indiana
- Jill Long Thompson - U.S. Congresswoman
- Megan Mullins - Country Musician
- Hannah Schaefer - Christian Musician
- Oral Swigart - American naval officer

== See also ==
- List of high schools in Indiana
