= List of Indiana state historical markers in Whitley County =

Location of Whitley County in Indiana

This is a list of the Indiana state historical markers in Whitley County.

This is intended to be a complete list of the official state historical markers placed in Whitley County, Indiana, United States by the Indiana Historical Bureau. The locations of the historical markers and their latitude and longitude coordinates are included below when available, along with their names, years of placement, and topics as recorded by the Historical Bureau. There are 5 historical markers located in Whitley County.

== Historical markers ==
Marker title	Image	Year placed	Location	Topics
Wm. Wells 1770-1812		1959	Whitley County Museum, 108 W. Jefferson Street in Columbia City; 41°9′33.6″N 85°29′19.5″W	American Indian/Native American, Early Settlement and Exploration
Home of Thomas R. Marshall		1966	Whitley County Museum, 108 W. Jefferson Street in Columbia City; 41°9′33.6″N 85°29′19″W	Politics
Site of Little Turtle's Miami Village		1966	E. Old Trail Road (County Road 450E), 5 miles east of Columbia City; 41°9′53″N 85°24′22.8″W	American Indian/Native American, Military
Eel River Battlefield War of 1812		2001	Northeastern corner of the junction of S. Raber, E. Mowrey, and Paige Roads at the Eel River bridge, 2.8 miles southeast of the Whitley County Courthouse in Columbia City; 41°8′19″N 85°27′25″W	Military, American Indian/Native American
Ralph F Gates		2013	Whitley County Courthouse, Columbia City; 41°09′24″N 85°29′21″W	Politics, Government, World War II

== See also ==
- List of Indiana state historical markers
- National Register of Historic Places listings in Whitley County, Indiana
