= Coesse Corners, Indiana =

- Unincorporated community
- Whitley County's location in Indiana

- Location of Coesse Corners in Whitley County
- Coordinates: 41°08′21″N 85°23′45″W
- Country: United States
- State: Indiana
- County: Whitley
- Township: Union
- Elevation: 863 ft (263 m)
- Time zone: UTC-5 (Eastern (EST))
  - Summer (DST): UTC-4 (EDT)
- ZIP code: 46725
- Area code: 260
- GNIS feature ID: 432730

Coesse Corners (/ˌkoʊˈɛsi/ koh-ES-ee) is an unincorporated community in Union Township, Whitley County, in the U.S. state of Indiana.

Coesse Corners is located north of Coesse.
