= Tri-Lakes, Indiana =

- Unincorporated community
- Location of Tri-Lakes in Whitley County, Indiana.
- Coordinates: 41°14′45″N 85°26′35″W
- Country: United States
- State: Indiana
- County: Whitley
- Township: Thorncreek

Area
  - Total: 4.02 sq mi (10.41 km^{2})
  - Land: 3.42 sq mi (8.85 km^{2})
  - Water: 0.60 sq mi (1.56 km^{2})
- Elevation: 912 ft (278 m)

Population (2020)
  - Total: 1,329
  - Density: 388.9/sq mi (150.16/km^{2})
- Time zone: UTC-5 (Eastern (EST))
  - Summer (DST): UTC-4 (EDT)
- ZIP code: 46725
- Area code: 260
- FIPS code: 18-76526
- GNIS feature ID: 2393257

Tri-Lakes is an unincorporated community and census-designated place in Thorncreek and Smith townships in Whitley County, Indiana, United States. As of the 2020 census, Tri-Lakes had a population of 1,329.

== Geography ==
Tri-Lakes settlement is located on land surrounding Big Cedar Lake, Little Cedar Lake, Round Lake, and Shriner Lake.

== Demographics ==
Historical population
Census	Pop.	Note	%±
2020	1,329		—
U.S. Decennial Census

=== 2020 census ===
As of the 2020 census, Tri-Lakes had a population of 1,329. The median age was 53.6 years. 14.2% of residents were under the age of 18 and 27.6% of residents were 65 years of age or older. For every 100 females there were 102.0 males, and for every 100 females age 18 and over there were 102.5 males age 18 and over.

0.0% of residents lived in urban areas, while 100.0% lived in rural areas.

There were 627 households in Tri-Lakes, of which 18.2% had children under the age of 18 living in them. Of all households, 53.3% were married-couple households, 20.6% were households with a male householder and no spouse or partner present, and 18.0% were households with a female householder and no spouse or partner present. About 28.4% of all households were made up of individuals and 14.1% had someone living alone who was 65 years of age or older.

There were 797 housing units, of which 21.3% were vacant. The homeowner vacancy rate was 0.3% and the rental vacancy rate was 6.7%.

Racial composition as of the 2020 census
Race	Number	Percent
White	1,284	96.6%
Black or African American	1	0.1%
American Indian and Alaska Native	4	0.3%
Asian	4	0.3%
Native Hawaiian and Other Pacific Islander	0	0.0%
Some other race	1	0.1%
Two or more races	35	2.6%
Hispanic or Latino (of any race)	8	0.6%
