= Richland Township, Whitley County, Indiana =

Richland Township
- Township
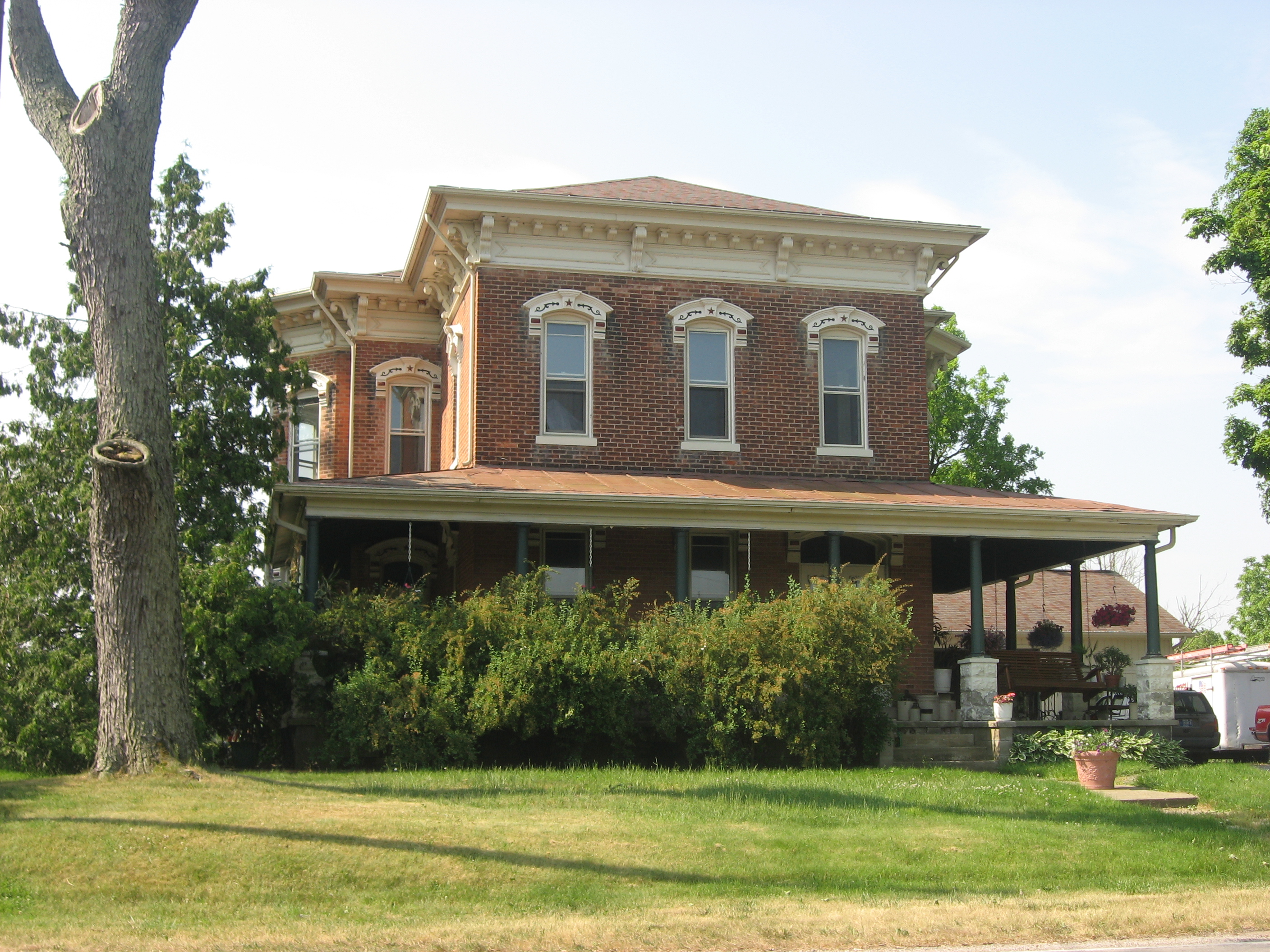
- The Dr. Christopher Souder House in Larwill

- Location in Whitley County
- Coordinates: 41°09′25″N 85°36′55″W
- Country: United States
- State: Indiana
- County: Whitley

Government
  - Type: Indiana township

Area
  - Total: 37.19 sq mi (96.3 km^{2})
  - Land: 37.05 sq mi (96.0 km^{2})
  - Water: 0.14 sq mi (0.36 km^{2}) 0.38%
- Elevation: 883 ft (269 m)

Population (2020)
  - Total: 1,786
  - Density: 47.4/sq mi (18.3/km^{2})
- Time zone: UTC-5 (Eastern (EST))
  - Summer (DST): UTC-4 (EDT)
- Area code: 260
- GNIS feature ID: 453801

Richland Township is one of nine townships in Whitley County, Indiana, United States. As of the 2020 census, its population was 1,786 (up from 1,758 at the 2010 census) and it contained 702 housing units.

== Geography ==
According to the 2010 census, the township has a total area of 37.19 square miles (96.3 km^{2}), of which 37.05 square miles (96.0 km^{2}) (or 99.62%) is land and 0.14 square miles (0.36 km^{2}) (or 0.38%) is water. Lakes in this township include Black Lake, Compton Lake, Ice House Lake, Larwill Lake, Little Wilson Lake, Menzie Lake, Souder Lake and Wilson Lake. The streams of Betzner Branch, Ford Branch, Jones Branch, Kaler Branch and King Branch run through this township.

=== Cities and towns ===
- Larwill

=== Adjacent townships ===
- Etna-Troy Township (north)
- Thorncreek Township (northeast)
- Columbia Township (east)
- Cleveland Township (south)
- Jackson Township, Kosciusko County (southwest)
- Monroe Township, Kosciusko County (west)
- Washington Township, Kosciusko County (northwest)

=== Cemeteries ===
The township contains two cemeteries: Lakeview and Richland Center.

=== Major highways ===
- U.S. Route 30
- Indiana State Road 5

== Education ==
Richland Township residents may obtain a free library card from the South Whitley Community Public Library.
