= Lake Township, Allen County, Indiana =

Lake Township
- Township
- Location in Allen County, Indiana
- Coordinates: 41°07′45″N 85°16′30″W
- Country: United States
- State: Indiana
- County: Allen

Government
  - Type: Indiana township

Area
  - Total: 35.82 sq mi (92.77 km^{2})
  - Land: 35.73 sq mi (92.55 km^{2})
  - Water: 0.089 sq mi (0.23 km^{2}) 0.24%
- Elevation: 856 ft (261 m)

Population (2020)
  - Total: 2,789
  - Density: 64/sq mi (24.9/km^{2})
- ZIP codes: 46723, 46818
- GNIS feature ID: 0453535

Lake Township is one of twenty townships in Allen County, Indiana, United States. As of the 2010 census, its population was 2,301.

== Geography ==
According to the United States Census Bureau, Lake Township covers an area of 35.82 square miles (92.77 km^{2}); of this, 35.73 square miles (92.55 km^{2}) is land and 0.089 square miles (0.23 km^{2}), or 0.24 percent, is water. Lake Everett is in this township.

=== Unincorporated towns ===
- Arcola at 41.103659°N 85.294141°W
- Lake Everett

(This list is based on USGS data and may include former settlements.)

=== Adjacent townships ===
- Eel River Township (north)
- Washington Township (east)
- Wayne Township (southeast)
- Aboite Township (south)
- Jefferson Township, Whitley County (southwest)
- Union Township, Whitley County (west)
- Smith Township, Whitley County (northwest)

=== Cemeteries ===
The township contains Saint Patricks Cemetery.

=== Major highways ===
- US 30
- US 33

=== Airports and landing strips ===
- Kellys Patch Airport

== School districts ==
- Northwest Allen County Schools

== Political districts ==
- Indiana's 3rd congressional district
- State House District 83
- State Senate District 17
