= Lake Everett, Indiana =

- Unincorporated community Census-designated place
- Location within Indiana Location within the United States
- Coordinates: 41°9′14.86″N 85°18′55.03″W
- Country: United States
- State: Indiana
- County: Allen
- Township: Lake
- Named for: Lake Everett
- Elevation: 833 ft (254 m)
- GNIS feature ID: 2830306

Lake Everett is an unincorporated community and census designated place in Lake Township, Allen County, Indiana, United States. It is named after Lake Everett.

== Demographics ==
The United States Census Bureau delineated Lake Everett as a census designated place in the 2022 American Community Survey.
