= Union Township, Whitley County, Indiana =

Union Township
- Township
- Location in Whitley County
- Coordinates: 41°07′59″N 85°23′44″W
- Country: United States
- State: Indiana
- County: Whitley

Government
  - Type: Indiana township

Area
  - Total: 36.99 sq mi (95.8 km^{2})
  - Land: 36.95 sq mi (95.7 km^{2})
  - Water: 0.04 sq mi (0.10 km^{2}) 0.11%
- Elevation: 833 ft (254 m)

Population (2020)
  - Total: 2,625
  - Density: 60.7/sq mi (23.4/km^{2})
- Time zone: UTC-5 (Eastern (EST))
  - Summer (DST): UTC-4 (EDT)
- Area code: 260
- GNIS feature ID: 453940

Union Township is one of nine townships in Whitley County, Indiana, United States. As of the 2020 census, its population was 2,625 (up from 2,244 at 2010) and it contained 1,144 housing units.

== Geography ==
According to the 2010 census, the township has a total area of 36.99 square miles (95.8 km^{2}), of which 36.95 square miles (95.7 km^{2}) (or 99.89%) is land and 0.04 square miles (0.10 km^{2}) (or 0.11%) is water. The stream of Emerick Branch runs through this township.

=== Cities and towns ===
- Columbia City (east edge)

=== Unincorporated towns ===
- Coesse at 41.1278248°N 85.3952547°W
- Coesse Corners at 41.1400470°N 85.3958103°W

(This list is based on USGS data and may include former settlements.)

=== Adjacent townships ===
- Smith Township (north)
- Lake Township, Allen County (east)
- Aboite Township, Allen County (southeast)
- Jefferson Township (south)
- Washington Township (southwest)
- Columbia Township (west)
- Thorncreek Township (northwest)

=== Cemeteries ===
The township contains three cemeteries, Coesse Hope Lutheran Cemetery (NE corner of US 30 and 500 E) Wigent-Taylor cemetery (east of 600E on Old Trail Road) and Eel River Presbyterian cemetery on Lincoln Way just east of 600 E.

=== Major highways ===
- U.S. Route 30
- Indiana State Road 205

=== Airports and landing strips ===
- Gordon Airport
