= Andy Adams (writer) =

American writer

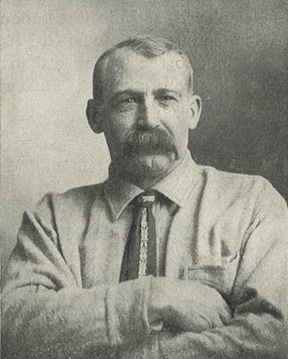
- Andy Adams, c. 1900
- Born: May 3, 1859; Thorncreek Township, Indiana, U.S.
- Died: September 26, 1935 (aged 76); Colorado Springs, Colorado, U.S.
- Writing career
- Genre: Western fiction

Andy Adams (May 3, 1859 – September 26, 1935) was an American writer of Western fiction.

== Life and career ==
Andy Adams was born in Thorncreek Township, Indiana, the son of Andrew Adams, who was of Irish descent, and Elizabeth Elliott, who was of Scottish descent. As a boy, he helped with the cattle and horses on the family farm. During the early 1880s, he went to Texas, where he stayed for 10 years, spending much of that time driving cattle on the western trails. In 1890, he tried working as a businessman, but the venture failed, so he tried gold mining in Colorado and Nevada. In 1894, he settled in Colorado Springs, where he lived until his death.

He began writing at the age of 43, publishing his most successful book, The Log of a Cowboy, in 1903. His other works include A Texas Matchmaker (1904), The Outlet (1905), Cattle Brands (1906), Reed Anthony, Cowman: An Autobiography (1907), Wells Brothers (1911), and The Ranch on the Beaver (1927).

The Log of a Cowboy is an account of a five-month drive of 3,000 cattle from Brownsville, Texas, to Montana during 1882 along the Great Western Cattle Trail. Although the book is fiction, it is based on Adams's own experiences, and it is considered by many to be literature's best account of cowboy life. Adams was disgusted by the unrealistic cowboy fiction being published in his time; The Log of a Cowboy was his response.

== Works ==
- 1903: The Log of a Cowboy
- 1904: A Texas Matchmaker
- 1905: The Outlet
- 1906: Cattle Brands: A Collection of Western Camp-fire Stories - contains 14 short stories.
- 1907: Reed Anthony, Cowman: An Autobiography - Adams breathes life into the story of a Texas cowboy who becomes a wealthy and influential cattleman.
- 1911: The Wells Brothers: The Young Cattle Kings - tells the tale of two orphaned boys, who against all odds and in the face of numerous calamities, establish their own cattle ranch. It was followed by a sequel, The Ranch on the Beaver (1927).
- 1927: The Ranch on the Beaver: A Sequel to Wells Brothers.
