= Cleveland Township, Whitley County, Indiana =

Cleveland Township
- Township
- Location in Whitley County
- Coordinates: 41°03′58″N 85°37′34″W
- Country: United States
- State: Indiana
- County: Whitley

Government
  - Type: Indiana township

Area
  - Total: 49.04 sq mi (127.0 km^{2})
  - Land: 49.04 sq mi (127.0 km^{2})
  - Water: 0 sq mi (0 km^{2}) 0%
- Elevation: 846 ft (258 m)

Population (2020)
  - Total: 3,324
  - Density: 69.3/sq mi (26.8/km^{2})
- Time zone: UTC-5 (Eastern (EST))
  - Summer (DST): UTC-4 (EDT)
- Area code: 260
- GNIS feature ID: 453226

Cleveland Township is one of nine townships in Whitley County, Indiana, United States. As of the 2020 census, its population was 3,324 (down from 3,398 at 2010) and it contained 1,398 housing units.

== Geography ==
According to the 2010 census, the township has a total area of 49.04 square miles (127.0 km^{2}), all land. The Eel River flows westward through the township. The streams of Clear Creek, Spring Creek, Sugar Creek and Sycamore Creek run through this township. Lakes in this township include T Lake.

=== Cities and towns ===
- South Whitley

=== Unincorporated towns ===
- Collamer at 41.0758786°N 85.6647057°W
- Luther at 41.0028235°N 85.5738687°W

(This list is based on USGS data and may include former settlements.)

=== Adjacent townships ===
- Richland Township (north)
- Columbia Township (northeast)
- Washington Township (east)
- Clear Creek Township, Huntington County (southeast)
- Warren Township, Huntington County (south)
- Chester Township, Wabash County (southwest)
- Jackson Township, Kosciusko County (west)
- Monroe Township, Kosciusko County (northwest)

=== Cemeteries ===
The township contains one cemetery, Cleveland.

=== Major highways ===
- Indiana State Road 5
- Indiana State Road 14
- Indiana State Road 105
- Indiana State Road 205

=== Airports and landing strips ===
- Mishler Landing Strip

== Education ==
Cleveland Township residents may obtain a free library card from the South Whitley Community Public Library.
