= Collamer =

Collamer may refer to:

- Jacob Collamer (1791-1865), a politician
- Collamer, Indiana, an unincorporated community
- The collagen-like material used in implanted collamer lenses
