= Ellisville =

Ellisville may refer to:

== Places ==
United States

- Ellisville, Alabama
- Ellisville, Illinois
- Ellisville, Indiana
- Ellisville, Massachusetts
- Ellisville, Mississippi
- Ellisville, Missouri
- Ellisville, Wisconsin
