= Jefferson Township, Whitley County, Indiana =

Jefferson Township
- Township
- Location in Whitley County
- Coordinates: 41°02′40″N 85°24′11″W
- Country: United States
- State: Indiana
- County: Whitley

Government
  - Type: Indiana township

Area
  - Total: 35.08 sq mi (90.9 km^{2})
  - Land: 35.08 sq mi (90.9 km^{2})
  - Water: 0 sq mi (0 km^{2}) 0%
- Elevation: 850 ft (259 m)

Population (2020)
  - Total: 2,232
  - Density: 62.2/sq mi (24.0/km^{2})
- Time zone: UTC-5 (Eastern (EST))
  - Summer (DST): UTC-4 (EDT)
- Area code: 260
- GNIS feature ID: 453504

Jefferson Township is one of nine townships in Whitley County, Indiana, United States. As of the 2020 census, its population was 2,232 (up from 2,182 at 2010) and it contained 905 housing units.

== Geography ==
According to the 2010 census, the township has a total area of 35.08 square miles (90.9 km^{2}), all land.

=== Unincorporated towns ===
- Dunfee at 41.0867140°N 85.3371973°W
- Raber at 41.0858799°N 85.4327550°W
- Saturn at 41.0347692°N 85.3555305°W

(This list is based on USGS data and may include former settlements.)

=== Adjacent townships ===
- Union Township (north)
- Lake Township, Allen County (northeast)
- Aboite Township, Allen County (east)
- Jackson Township, Huntington County (south)
- Clear Creek Township, Huntington County (southwest)
- Washington Township (west)
- Columbia Township (northwest)

=== Cemeteries ===
The township contains two cemeteries: Bayliss and Broxon.

=== Major highways ===
- U.S. Route 24
- Indiana State Road 14
- Indiana State Road 114

=== Airports and landing strips ===
- Homestead Airport
