= Hannah Schaefer =

American Christian musician (born 1996)

- Born: Hannah Anise Schaefer; June 2, 1996 (age 30); Columbia City, Indiana
- Genres: CCM, Christian pop
- Occupations: Singer, songwriter
- Instrument: vocals
- Years active: 2015–present
- Website: hannahschaefermusic.com

Hannah Schaefer (born June 2, 1996) is an American Christian musician, who plays writes, plays and sings a Christian pop style of music. She released All the Way, an extended play, in 2015, and her first album Who I Am in 2020.

== Biography ==
Hannah Anise Schaefer was born on June 2, 1996, in Columbia City, Indiana. Before embarking on her Christian music career, she was accepted into the Jacob's School of Music at Indiana University, but decided not to attend. She is a practicing Roman Catholic at St. Paul of the Cross Parish.

She started her music recording career with the extended play All the Way, released on October 30, 2015. She won the John Lennon Songwriting Contest in the Gospel/Inspirational category that same year.

== Discography ==
EPs

- All the Way (October 30, 2015)

Albums

- Who I Am (March 20, 2020)
- Crown (October 1, 2021)
