= Etna-Troy Township, Whitley County, Indiana =

Etna-Troy Township
- Township
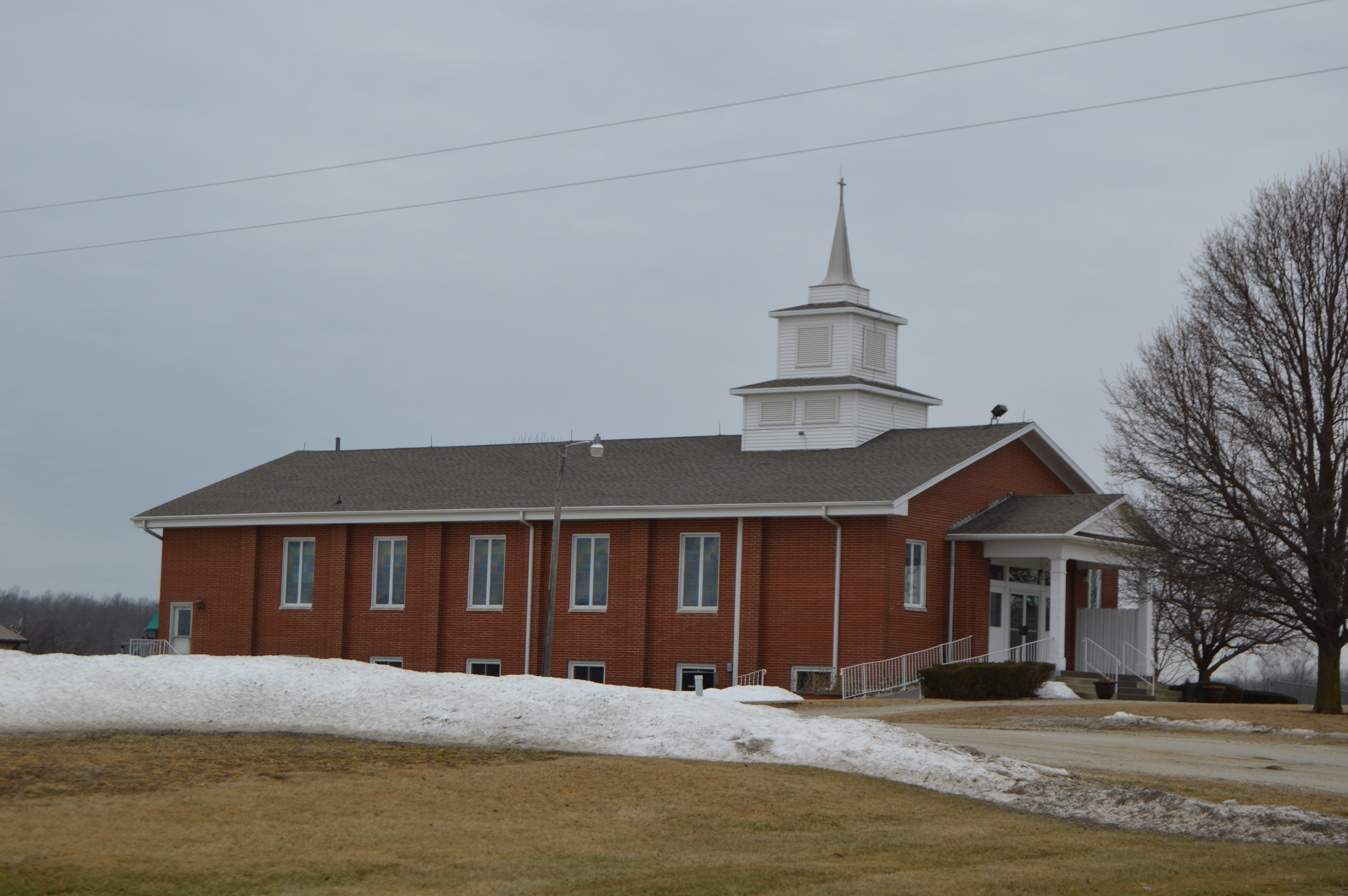
- Troy Presbyterian Church

- Location in Whitley County
- Coordinates: 41°15′37″N 85°35′30″W
- Country: United States
- State: Indiana
- County: Whitley

Government
  - Type: Indiana township

Area
  - Total: 36.04 sq mi (93.3 km^{2})
  - Land: 35.19 sq mi (91.1 km^{2})
  - Water: 0.85 sq mi (2.2 km^{2}) 2.36%
- Elevation: 932 ft (284 m)

Population (2020)
  - Total: 1,863
  - Density: 53.7/sq mi (20.7/km^{2})
- Time zone: UTC-5 (Eastern (EST))
  - Summer (DST): UTC-4 (EDT)
- Area code: 260
- GNIS feature ID: 453281

Etna-Troy Township is one of nine townships in Whitley County, Indiana, United States. As of the 2020 census, its population was 1,863 (down from 1,889 at 2010) and it contained 875 housing units.

== History ==
Etna Township, which was annexed by Whitley County from Noble County in 1860, merged with its neighbor to the south, Troy Township, in 1951.

== Geography ==
According to the 2010 census, the township has a total area of 36.04 square miles (93.3 km^{2}), of which 35.19 square miles (91.1 km^{2}) (or 97.64%) is land and 0.85 square miles (2.2 km^{2}) (or 2.36%) is water. Lakes in this township include Goose Lake, Indian Lake, Little Troy Cedar Lake, Loon Lake, Mud Lake, New Lake, Old Lake, Rine Lake, Robinson Lake, Scott Lake, Tadpole Lake, Troy Cedar Lake and Winters Lake. The stream of Cedar Lake Branch runs through this township.

=== Unincorporated towns ===
- Etna at 41.2736574°N 85.5735942°W
- Lorane at 41.2069904°N 85.5585931°W
- Ormas at 41.2950468°N 85.5460935°W

(This list is based on USGS data and may include former settlements.)

=== Adjacent townships ===
- Washington Township, Noble County (north)
- Noble Township, Noble County (northeast)
- Thorncreek Township (east)
- Richland Township (south)
- Washington Township, Kosciusko County (west)
- Tippecanoe Township, Kosciusko County (northwest)

=== Cemeteries ===
The township contains four cemeteries: Adams, Kiester, Pleasant Grove and Scott.

=== Major highways ===
- Indiana State Road 5
