= Laud, Indiana =

- Unincorporated community and Census-designated place
- Whitley County's location in Indiana

- Location of Laud in Whitley County
- Coordinates: 41°02′54″N 85°27′00″W
- Country: United States
- State: Indiana
- County: Whitley
- Township: Washington
- Elevation: 856 ft (261 m)
- Time zone: UTC-5 (Eastern (EST))
  - Summer (DST): UTC-4 (EDT)
- ZIP code: 46725
- Area code: 260
- GNIS feature ID: 2830585

Laud is an unincorporated community in Washington Township, Whitley County, in the U.S. state of Indiana.

== History ==
A post office was established at Laud in 1855, and remained in operation until it was discontinued in 1903.

== Demographics ==
The United States Census Bureau delineated Laud as a census designated place in the 2022 American Community Survey.
