= Collins, Indiana =

- Unincorporated community
- Whitley County's location in Indiana

- Location of Collins in Whitley County
- Coordinates: 41°11′51″N 85°23′12″W
- Country: United States
- State: Indiana
- County: Whitley
- Township: Smith
- Elevation: 863 ft (263 m)
- Time zone: UTC-5 (Eastern (EST))
  - Summer (DST): UTC-4 (EDT)
- ZIP code: 46725
- Area code: 260
- FIPS code: 18-14518
- GNIS feature ID: 432790

Collins is an unincorporated community in Smith Township, Whitley County, in the U.S. state of Indiana. It is commonly referred to as a 'ghost town', however this is untrue; Collins just has a very low population and once contained an abandoned school, a General Store, and a Mint mill that processed locally grown peppermint. Collins was also a major grower of Onions, and the Vandalia Railroad shipped tons of onions to national markets.

== History ==
Collins was platted in 1872, and was named after James Collins, a railroad official.

A post office was established at Collins in 1872, and remained in operation until it was discontinued in 1913.
