= Whitley County Consolidated Schools =

School district in Indiana, United States

Whitley County Consolidated Schools is located in Whitley County, Indiana, in the United States.

Whitley County Consolidated Schools include one pre-school, four elementary schools, one middle school, and two high schools. The pre-school is "OUR Kids preschool". The four elementary schools are Coesse Elementary School, Mary Raber Elementary School, Little Turtle Elementary School, and Northern Heights Elementary School. The middle school is called Indian Springs Middle School. The high schools are called Columbia City High School, and Eagle Tech Academy.

As of 2025, David Smith is President of the Board of School Trustees.
