= Peabody, Indiana =

- Unincorporated community
- Whitley County's location in Indiana

- Location of Peabody in Whitley County
- Coordinates: 41°05′07″N 85°29′22″W
- Country: United States
- State: Indiana
- County: Whitley
- Township: Washington
- Elevation: 830 ft (253 m)

Population
  - Total: About 15 to 23 people.
- Time zone: UTC-5 (Eastern (EST))
  - Summer (DST): UTC-4 (EDT)
- ZIP code: 46725
- Area code: 260
- FIPS code: 18-58536
- GNIS feature ID: 440953

Peabody is an unincorporated community in Washington Township, Whitley County, in the U.S. state of Indiana.

== History ==
Peabody was named after James Peabody, a local businessman.

A post office was established at Peabody in 1883, and remained in operation until it was discontinued in 1923.

== Geography ==
Peabody is located at 41°05′07″N 85°29′22″W.
