= Lorane, Indiana =

- Unincorporated community
- Whitley County's location in Indiana

- Location of Lorane in Whitley County
- Coordinates: 41°12′25″N 85°33′31″W
- Country: United States
- State: Indiana
- County: Whitley
- Township: Etna-Troy
- Elevation: 946 ft (288 m)
- Time zone: UTC-5 (Eastern (EST))
  - Summer (DST): UTC-4 (EDT)
- ZIP code: 46725
- Area code: 260
- GNIS feature ID: 438307

Lorane is an unincorporated community in Etna-Troy Township, Whitley County, in the U.S. state of Indiana.

== History ==
The community used to have three different names before the present-day name of Lorane. It was first called Steam Corners, so named after its steam-operated sawmills. It also used to be called Glory, so named after a legend about a local traveler who "went through Glory" after crossing a stream and seeing beautiful scenery. The community also had the name Buzzards Glory at one point. The present day name of Lorane was likely named after Lorraine, in France.

A post office was established at Lorane in 1851, and remained in operation until it was discontinued in 1904.
