= Washington Center, Indiana =

Washington Center
- Unincorporated town
- Whitley County's location in Indiana

- Location of Washington Center in Whitley County
- Coordinates: 41°02′54″N 85°30′33″W
- Country: United States
- State: Indiana
- County: Whitley
- Township: Washington
- Elevation: 840 ft (256 m)
- Time zone: UTC-5 (Eastern (EST))
  - Summer (DST): UTC-4 (EDT)
- ZIP code: 46725
- Area code: 260
- GNIS feature ID: 445498

Washington Center is an unincorporated town in Washington Township, Whitley County, in the U.S. state of Indiana.

== History ==
A post office was established at Washington Center in 1855, and remained in operation until it was discontinued in 1874.

== Geography ==
Washington Center is located at 41°02′54″N 85°30′33″W.
