= Tunker, Indiana =

- Unincorporated community
- Whitley County's location in Indiana

- Location of Tunker in Whitley County
- Coordinates: 41°02′55″N 85°33′27″W
- Country: United States
- State: Indiana
- County: Whitley
- Township: Washington
- Elevation: 843 ft (257 m)
- Time zone: UTC-5 (Eastern (EST))
  - Summer (DST): UTC-4 (EDT)
- ZIP code: 46787
- Area code: 260
- FIPS code: 18-76706
- GNIS feature ID: 444950

Tunker is an unincorporated community in Washington Township, Whitley County, in the U.S. state of Indiana.

== History ==
Tunker was founded in 1839 and was named after a family of settlers, the Tunker family. A post office was established in Tunker in 1886, and remained in operation until it was discontinued in 1904.

== Geography ==
Tunker is located at 41°02′55″N 85°33′27″W.
