= Collamer, Indiana =

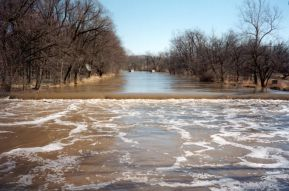
- Collamer Dam, over the Eel River

- Location within Whitley County, Indiana
- Coordinates: 41°04′33″N 85°39′53″W
- Country: United States
- State: Indiana
- County: Whitley
- Township: Cleveland
- Platted: February 9, 1846
- Elevation: 797 ft (243 m)
- Time zone: UTC-5 (Eastern (EST))
  - Summer (DST): UTC-4 (EDT)
- Area code: 260
- FIPS code: 18-14320
- GNIS feature ID: 432761

Collamer is an unincorporated community in Cleveland Township, Whitley County, Indiana, United States, located on the Eel River and at the intersection of Indiana State Road 14 and Whitley County road 900 W. Smith Rambo platted the town February 9, 1846. Collamer is named after Jacob Collamer, 13th United States Postmaster General.

== History ==
On October 23, 1826, in what is now Wabash, Indiana Potawatomi and Miami Indians signed a peace treaty with the United States government to open lands north of the Wabash River to white settlers. These negotiations, led by Michigan Governor Lewis Cass, resulted in the Paradise Springs Peace Treaty. The Potowatomi before that point were located on the Eel River, which they called the Kenapocomoco (KE-NA-PE-COM-A-QUA), in a series of villages named Pierrish's Village, located at present day North Manchester, southwest of Collamer. The Miami, led by Chief Little Turtle before that point had their villages located on the Eel River between South Whitley and Columbia City, northeast of Collamer.

Settlement of Collamer began in 1845, which was originally called Millersburg, after the town's first merchant Elias Miller. The location was selected because of the convenient location to the Wabash and Erie Railroad and the Eel River. When the town wished to established a post office, they discovered that the post office name Millersburg, Indiana had been taken. After some frustration and consideration, on September 18, 1849, they choose the name Collamer, after President Zachary Taylor's Postmaster General Jacob Collamer.

Built along the north side of the Eel River, the community by 1880 had a "gristmill, a sawmill, two general stores, a drug store, a boot and shoe store, a grade school, a Christian Church, a physician and a post office." In the early 1870s the Detroit, Eel River & Illinois Railroad was built alongside the east side of Collamer and began operations in 1872.

The rail line was abandoned between 1954 and 1977. Today only the Christian Church, the Collamer Church of God, and the pillars of the railroad bridge remain.

A post office was established at Collamer in 1849, and remained in operation until it was discontinued in 1922.

== Grist Mill ==
A structure similar in stature to the Stockdale Mill near Roann, Indiana, the four-story Collamer Grist Mill was built in 1845 by (Elias) Miller and Harder the summer before the official platting of the town. The mill first ground corn, then wheat and other small grains. "The Eel River provided a remarkable constant supply for the water-powered millstones. Early writers tell of the Eel as one of the best power streams around." Improvements were made to the mill in the late 1800s, with the removal of original millstones for a roller mill. Henry Hauptmeyer installed an electric generator to the mill and some years between 1918 and 1934 the mill and dam powered Collamer and neighboring community Sidney. After overloading problems and a washout of the mill race, the mill stopped operation. On May 19, 1934, the mill collapsed.

== Dam ==
Collamer's best known landmark was the Collamer Dam. The first dam was built in 1845 out of "wooden timbers with the chinks closed with packings of small sticks and straw," originally constructed to provide power for a gristmill. In 1904 the dam that stood until January 2020 was built by O. Grant Gandy and Company, and was used to power Collamer and Sidney for a time.

Due in part to damage sustained in October 2019, as well as ongoing safety concerns, including the death of 31-year-old kayaker Richard Vesely Wilson in 2017, removal of the Collamer Dam began on January 8, 2020. Demolition was completed the next day.

== Demographics ==
Because the town is unincorporated, no exact information is available from the United States Census Bureau. In the 1895 U.S. Atlas Indiana, Collamer had a population of 163.

== Notes ==
- "Collamer." Bulletin of the Whitley County Historical Society. (December 1964): 11.
- "Collamer." Bulletin of the Whitley County Historical Society. (February 1968): 9.
- "Collamer Dam." Bulletin of the Whitley County Historical Society. (October 1986): 17.
- "Collamer Grist Mill." Bulletin of the Whitley County Historical Society. (June 1964): 3–6.
- "Collamer Grist Mill." Bulletin of the Whitley County Historical Society. (March 2005): 22.
- "Collamer School." Bulletin of the Whitley County Historical Society. (December 1995): 5.
- "Collamer School." Bulletin of the Whitley County Historical Society. (June 2002): 8.
- "Collamer Store was Music Center for Happy Townsfolk." Bulletin of the Whitley County Historical Society. (April 1977): 13–15.
