= Dunfee, Indiana =

Unincorporated community in Indiana, US

- Unincorporated community
- Dunfee as seen in a map of Whitley County
- Coordinates: 41°05′08″N 85°20′13″W
- Country: United States
- State: Indiana
- County: Whitley, Allen
- Townships: Jefferson, Aboite
- Elevation: 856 ft (261 m)
- Time zone: UTC-5 (Eastern (EST))
  - Summer (DST): UTC-4 (EDT)
- ZIP code: 46725
- Area code: 260
- GNIS feature ID: 433778

Dunfee is an unincorporated community in Whitley and Allen counties, in the U.S. state of Indiana.

== History ==
A post office was established at Dunfee in 1883, and remained in operation until 1917. The community was likely named after the Dunfee family of settlers.
