= Aboite Township, Allen County, Indiana =

Aboite Township
- Township
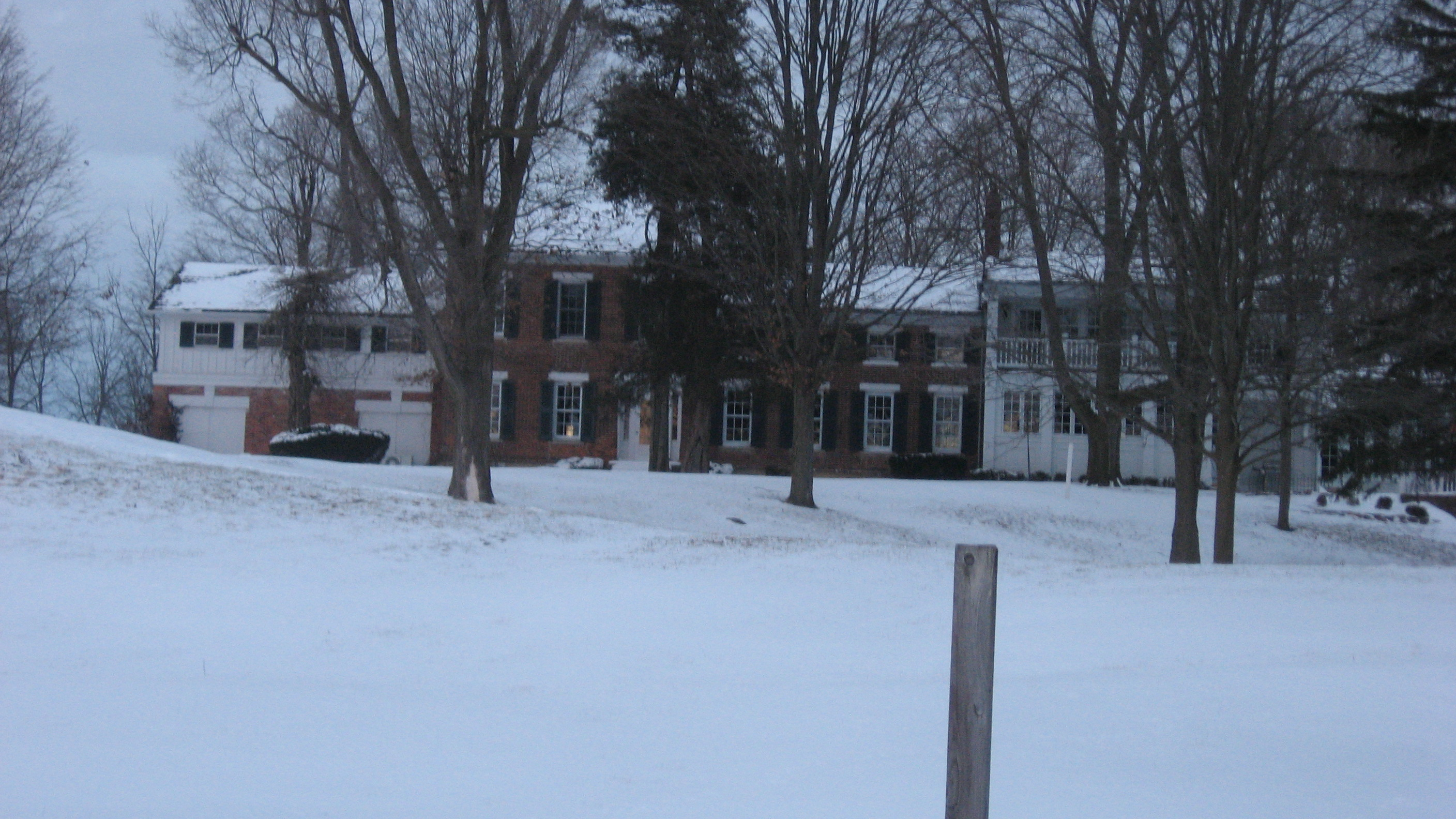
- Vermilyea Inn, a historic hotel in the township

- Location in Allen County, Indiana
- Coordinates: 41°03′08″N 85°17′07″W
- Country: United States
- State: Indiana
- County: Allen

Government
  - Type: Indiana township

Area
  - Total: 33.35 sq mi (86.4 km^{2})
  - Land: 33.33 sq mi (86.3 km^{2})
  - Water: 0.03 sq mi (0.078 km^{2}) 0.09%
- Elevation: 850 ft (259 m)

Population (2020)
  - Total: 42,082
  - Density: 1,073.2/sq mi (414.4/km^{2})
- Time zone: UTC-5 (Eastern (EST))
  - Summer (DST): UTC-4 (EDT)
- ZIP codes: 46783, 46804, 46809, 46814, 46818
- Area code: 260
- GNIS feature ID: 453072
- Website: www.aboitetwp.org

Aboite Township is one of twenty townships in Allen County, Indiana, United States. As of the 2010 census, its population was 35,765, up from 28,338 in 2000.

== History ==
Aboite Township was named from the Aboite Creek, which is derived from the French word for "minnow".

== Geography ==
According to the 2010 census, the township has a total area of 33.35 square miles (86.4 km^{2}), of which 33.33 square miles (86.3 km^{2}) (or 99.94%) is land and 0.03 square miles (0.078 km^{2}) (or 0.09%) is water.

=== Cities and towns ===
- Fort Wayne (western portion)

Fort Wayne incorporated approximately 12 square miles (31 km^{2}) of Aboite territory effective January 1, 2006.

=== Unincorporated towns ===
- Dunfee (partial) at 41.0856020°N 85.3363587°W
- Ellison at 41.027826°N 85.255806°W
- Ellisville at 41.018103°N 85.28414°W
- Timbercrest at 41.01727°N 85.314974°W

=== Fort Wayne neighborhoods ===
- Brierwood Hills at 41.055326°N 85.234139°W
- Covington Dells at 41.069492°N 85.233028°W
- Forest Ridge at 41.021992°N 85.273306°W
- Liberty Hills at 41.033381°N 85.266362°W
- Manor Woods at 41.025326°N 85.262195°W
- Parkway Hills at 41.028381°N 85.264417°W
- Rolling Hills at 41.02727°N 85.268029°W
- Westlakes at 41.0420450°N 85.2659413°W
- Westlawn at 41.080326°N 85.227473°W

=== Adjacent townships ===
- Lake Township (north)
- Washington Township (northeast)
- Wayne Township (east)
- Lafayette Township (south)
- Jackson Township, Huntington County (southwest)
- Jefferson Township, Whitley County (west)
- Union Township, Whitley County (northwest)

=== Major highways ===
- I-69
- US 24
- US 33
- SR 14

=== Cemeteries ===
The township contains these two cemeteries: Covington Memorial Gardens and Oak Grove.

=== Airports and landing strips ===
- Dennis Airport

== School districts ==
- Metropolitan School District of Southwest Allen County

== Political districts ==
- Indiana's 3rd congressional district
- State House District 82
- State House District 83
- State Senate District 16
