= Washington Township, Whitley County, Indiana =

Washington Township
- Township
- Location in Whitley County
- Coordinates: 41°02′58″N 85°30′22″W
- Country: United States
- State: Indiana
- County: Whitley

Government
  - Type: Indiana township

Area
  - Total: 35.5 sq mi (92 km^{2})
  - Land: 35.46 sq mi (91.8 km^{2})
  - Water: 0.04 sq mi (0.10 km^{2}) 0.11%
- Elevation: 837 ft (255 m)

Population (2020)
  - Total: 1,253
  - Density: 36.1/sq mi (13.9/km^{2})
- Time zone: UTC-5 (Eastern (EST))
  - Summer (DST): UTC-4 (EDT)
- Area code: 260
- GNIS feature ID: 454025

Washington Township is one of nine townships in Whitley County, Indiana, United States. As of the 2020 census, its population was 1,253 (down from 1,281 at 2010) and it contained 478 housing units.

== Geography ==
According to the 2010 census, the township has a total area of 35.5 square miles (92 km^{2}), of which 35.46 square miles (91.8 km^{2}) (or 99.89%) is land and 0.04 square miles (0.10 km^{2}) (or 0.11%) is water. The streams of Cox Branch and Huffman Branch run through this township.

=== Unincorporated towns ===
- Briggs at 41.0856020°N 85.4702558°W
- Laud at 41.0494908°N 85.4521993°W
- Peabody at 41.0858795°N 85.4894228°W
- Tunker at 41.0486569°N 85.5574799°W
- Washington Center at 41.0483793°N 85.5094228°W

(This list is based on USGS data and may include former settlements.)

=== Adjacent townships ===
- Columbia Township (north)
- Union Township (northeast)
- Jefferson Township (east)
- Jackson Township, Huntington County (southeast)
- Clear Creek Township, Huntington County (south)
- Warren Township, Huntington County (southwest)
- Cleveland Township (west)

=== Major highways ===
- Indiana State Road 9
- Indiana State Road 14
- Indiana State Road 114
