= Etna, Indiana =

- Unincorporated town
- Whitley County's location in Indiana

- Location of Etna in Whitley County
- Coordinates: 41°16′25″N 85°34′25″W
- Country: United States
- State: Indiana
- County: Whitley
- Township: Etna-Troy
- Elevation: 932 ft (284 m)
- Time zone: UTC-5 (Eastern (EST))
  - Summer (DST): UTC-4 (EDT)
- ZIP code: 46764
- Area code: 260
- FIPS code: 18-21484
- GNIS feature ID: 434242

Etna is an unincorporated town in Etna-Troy Township, Whitley County, in the U.S. state of Indiana.

== History ==
Etna was platted in 1849. The community was named after Etna, Ohio, the native home of a first settler.

A post office was established at Etna in 1851. The name of the post office was changed to Hecla in 1861, and operated under this name until 1904.
