= Thorncreek Township, Whitley County, Indiana =

Thorncreek Township
- Township
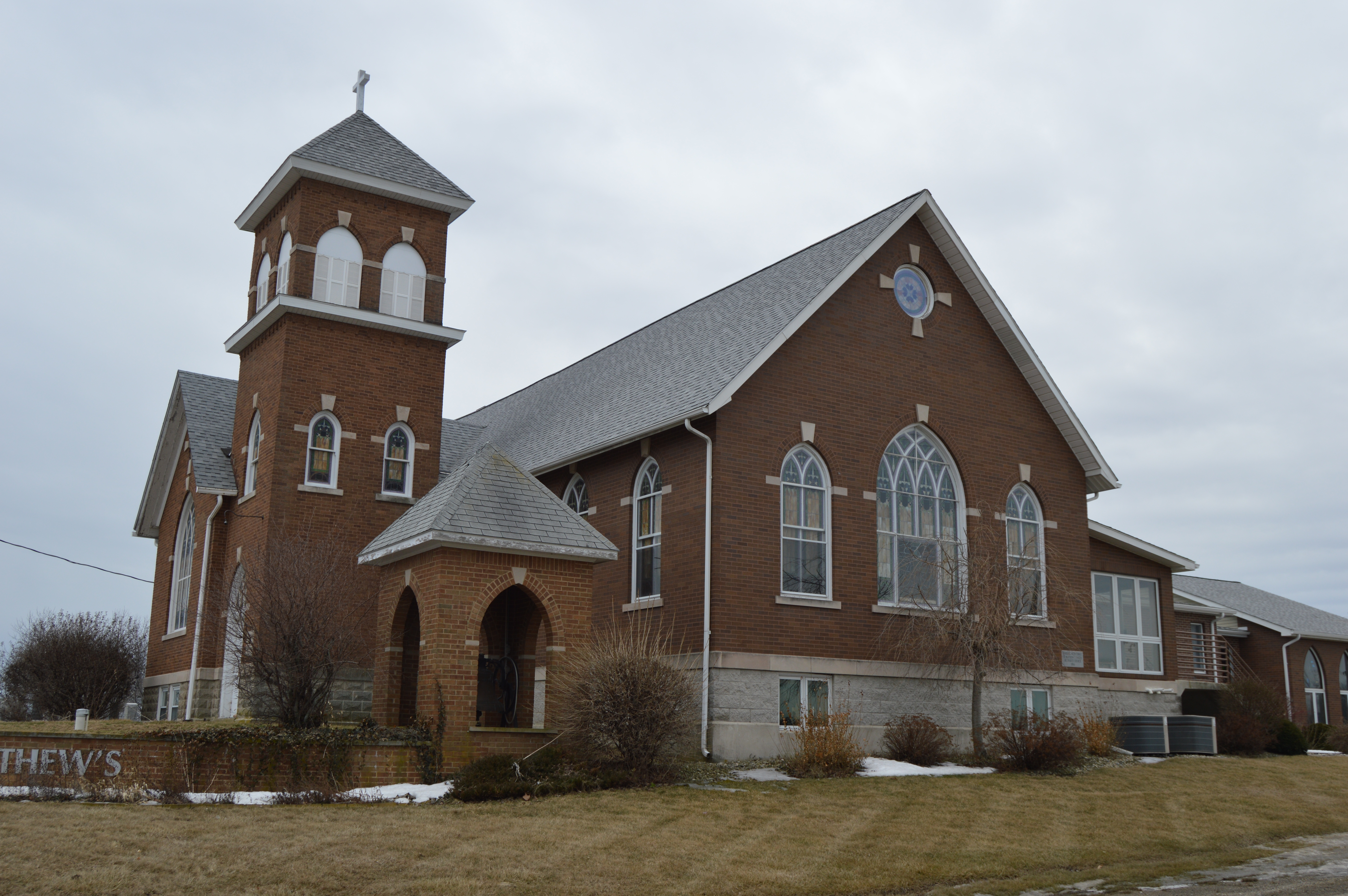
- St. Matthew's United Methodist Church on State Road 9

- Location in Whitley County
- Coordinates: 41°13′16″N 85°29′03″W
- Country: United States
- State: Indiana
- County: Whitley

Government
  - Type: Indiana township

Area
  - Total: 36.05 sq mi (93.4 km^{2})
  - Land: 35.17 sq mi (91.1 km^{2})
  - Water: 0.87 sq mi (2.3 km^{2}) 2.41%
- Elevation: 876 ft (267 m)

Population (2020)
  - Total: 4,159
  - Density: 118.4/sq mi (45.7/km^{2})
- Time zone: UTC-5 (Eastern (EST))
  - Summer (DST): UTC-4 (EDT)
- ZIP code: 46725
- Area code: 260
- GNIS feature ID: 453893

Thorncreek Township is one of nine townships in Whitley County, Indiana, United States. As of the 2020 census, its population was 4,159 (down slightly from 4,166 at 2010) and it contained 1,909 housing units.

The township has two main population clusters. The southern edge of the township consists of the unincorporated northern suburban developments of Columbia City, and in the extreme northeastern part of the township there is the unincorporated settlement and census-designated place known as Tri-Lakes.

== Geography ==
According to the 2010 census, the township has a total area of 36.05 square miles (93.4 km^{2}), of which 35.17 square miles (91.1 km^{2}) (or 97.56%) is land and 0.87 square miles (2.3 km^{2}) (or 2.41%) is water. Lakes in this township include Catfish Lake, Cedar Lake, Cedar Lake, Crooked Lake, Karen Lake, Little Cedar Lake, Little Crooked Lake, Metzger Pond, Round Lake and Shriner Lake. The streams of Sell Branch and Thorn Creek run through this township.

=== Unincorporated towns ===
- Five Points at 41.1928242°N 85.4916466°W
- Tri-Lakes at 41.2458802°N 85.4419238°W

(This list is based on USGS data and may include former settlements.)

=== Adjacent townships ===
- Noble Township, Noble County (north)
- Green Township, Noble County (northeast)
- Smith Township (east)
- Union Township (southeast)
- Columbia Township (south)
- Richland Township (southwest)
- Etna-Troy Township (west)

=== Cemeteries ===
The township contains one cemetery, Stough.

=== Major highways ===
- Indiana State Road 9
- Indiana State Road 109

=== Airports and landing strips ===
- Motherwell Airport

== Demographics ==
Historical population
Census	Pop.	Note	%±
U.S. Decennial Census

As of the census of 2000, there were 3,925 people, 1,480 households, and 1,164 families residing in the township. The population density was 111.6 inhabitants per square mile (43.1/km^{2}). There were 1,652 housing units at an average density of 47.0 per square mile (18.1/km^{2}). The racial makeup of the township was 98.88% White, 0.08% African American, 0.18% Native American, 0.31% Asian, 0.03% Pacific Islander, 0.18% from other races, and 0.36% from two or more races. Hispanic or Latino of any race were 0.61% of the populations.

There were 1,480 households, out of which 34.4% had children under the age of 18 living with them, 70.2% were married couples living together, 4.6% had a female householder with no husband present, and 21.3% were non-families. 17.0% of all households were made up of individuals, and 5.5% had someone living alone who was 65 years of age or older. The average household size was 2.65 and the average family size was 2.99.

In the township the population was spread out, with 26.2% under the age of 18, 6.2% from 18 to 24, 28.3% from 25 to 44, 28.3% from 45 to 64, and 11.1% who were 65 years of age or older. The median age was 40 years. For every 100 females there were 108.4 males. For every 100 females age 18 and over, there were 105.0 males.

The median income for a household in the township was $52,429, and the median income for a family was $56,473. Males had a median income of $42,068 versus $25,054 for females. The per capita income for the township was $22,590. None of the families and 1.8% of the population were living below the poverty line, including no under eighteens and none of those over 64.
