= Columbia Township, Whitley County, Indiana =

Columbia Township
- Township
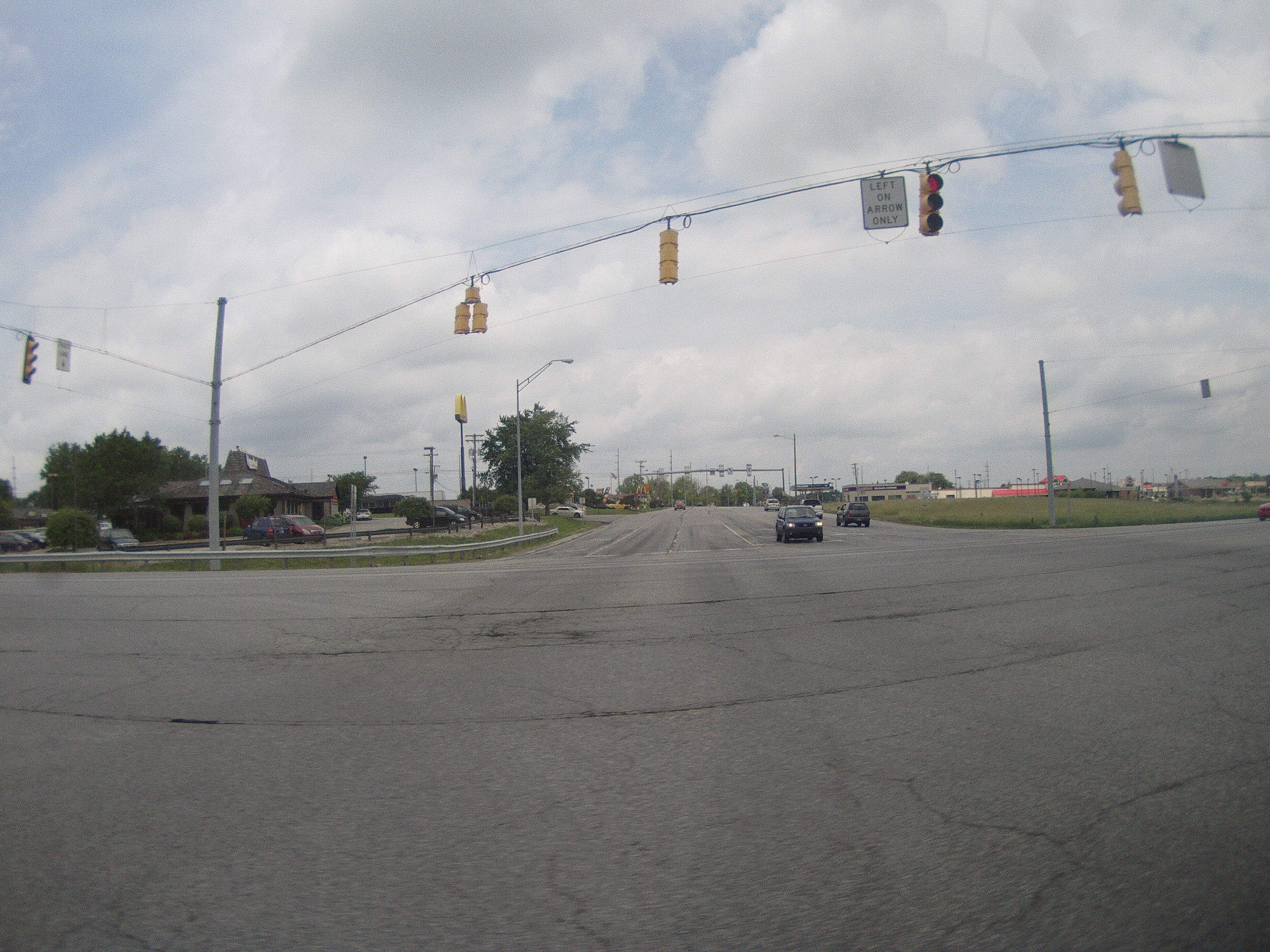
- Intersection of U.S. 30 and State Highway 9 in Columbia Township

- Location in Whitley County
- Coordinates: 41°08′05″N 85°30′45″W
- Country: United States
- State: Indiana
- County: Whitley

Government
  - Type: Indiana township

Area
  - Total: 36.73 sq mi (95.1 km^{2})
  - Land: 36.71 sq mi (95.1 km^{2})
  - Water: 0.02 sq mi (0.052 km^{2}) 0.05%
- Elevation: 830 ft (253 m)

Population (2020)
  - Total: 11,715
  - Density: 301/sq mi (116/km^{2})
- Time zone: UTC-5 (Eastern (EST))
  - Summer (DST): UTC-4 (EDT)
- Area code: 260
- GNIS feature ID: 453242
- Website: columbiatownship.net

Columbia Township is one of the nine townships within Whitley County, Indiana, United States. As of the 2020 census, the township's population was recorded at 11,715 (up from 11,047 at 2010), with a total of 5,107 housing units within its boundaries.

== Geography ==
Based on data from the 2010 census, Columbia Township encompasses a total area of 36.73 square miles (95.1 km^{2}). Within this expanse, 36.71 square miles (95.1 km^{2}), equivalent to 99.95% of the total area, constitutes land, while a minor portion of 0.02 square miles (0.052 km^{2}), equivalent to 0.05%, consists of water bodies. The landscape of the township contains several watercourses, including Blue Babe Branch, Blue River and Stony Creek.

=== Cities and towns ===
- Columbia City (vast majority)

=== Unincorporated towns ===
(This list is based on USGS data and may include former settlements.)

=== Adjacent townships ===
- Thorncreek Township (north)
- Union Township (east)
- Jefferson Township (southeast)
- Washington Township (south)
- Cleveland Township (southwest)
- Richland Township (west)

=== Cemeteries ===
The township contains fourteen cemeteries: Brown, Compton/Oak Grove, County Home, Eberhard, Greenhill, Hell's Half Acre, Nolt(Beaver Reserve), Potter's Field, Ream(Bethel), Saint Peter, Shoemaker, South Park, South Park Annex and Spooktown.

=== Major highways ===
- U.S. Route 30
- Indiana State Road 9
- Indiana State Road 109
- Indiana State Road 205
