= Blue Lake, Indiana =

Blue Lake
- Unincorporated community
- Whitley County's location in Indiana

- Location of Blue Lake in Whitley County
- Coordinates: 41°14′25″N 85°20′58″W
- Country: United States
- State: Indiana
- County: Whitley
- Township: Smith
- Elevation: 850 ft (260 m)
- ZIP code: 46723
- GNIS feature ID: 431230

Blue Lake is an unincorporated community in Smith Township, Whitley County, in the U.S. state of Indiana.
