= Raber, Indiana =

- Unincorporated community
- Whitley County's location in Indiana

- Location of Raber in Whitley County
- Coordinates: 41°05′09″N 85°25′58″W
- Country: United States
- State: Indiana
- County: Whitley
- Township: Jefferson
- Elevation: 846 ft (258 m)
- Time zone: UTC-5 (Eastern (EST))
  - Summer (DST): UTC-4 (EDT)
- ZIP code: 46725
- Area code: 260
- FIPS code: 18-62604
- GNIS feature ID: 441712

Raber is an unincorporated community in Jefferson Township, Whitley County, in the U.S. state of Indiana.

== History ==
Raber was named after Samuel Raber, an early settler.

A post office was established at Raber in 1884 and remained in operation until 1902.

== Geography ==
Raber is at 41°05′09″N 85°25′58″W.
