= Coesse, Indiana =

- Unincorporated town and Census-designated place
- Whitley County's location in Indiana

- Location of Coesse in Whitley County
- Coordinates: 41°07′33″N 85°23′58″W
- Country: United States
- State: Indiana
- County: Whitley
- Township: Union
- Founded: c. 1854

Area
  - Total: 0.66 sq mi (1.70 km^{2})
  - Land: 0.66 sq mi (1.70 km^{2})
  - Water: 0 sq mi (0.00 km^{2})
- Elevation: 850 ft (260 m)
- Time zone: UTC-5 (Eastern (EST))
  - Summer (DST): UTC-4 (EDT)
- ZIP code: 46725
- Area code: 260
- FIPS code: 18-14104
- GNIS feature ID: 2830584

Coesse (/ˌkoʊˈɛsi/ koh-ES-ee) is an unincorporated town in Union Township, Whitley County, in the U.S. state of Indiana.

== History ==
Coesse was platted in 1854, and was named after Chief Coesse (Kowazi), who was the grandson of Miami Chief Michikinikwa (Little Turtle). A post office was established at Coesse in 1843, and remained in operation until it was discontinued in 1967.

== Demographics ==
The United States Census Bureau delineated Coesse as a census designated place in the 2022 American Community Survey.
