= Larwill, Indiana =

Larwill
- Town
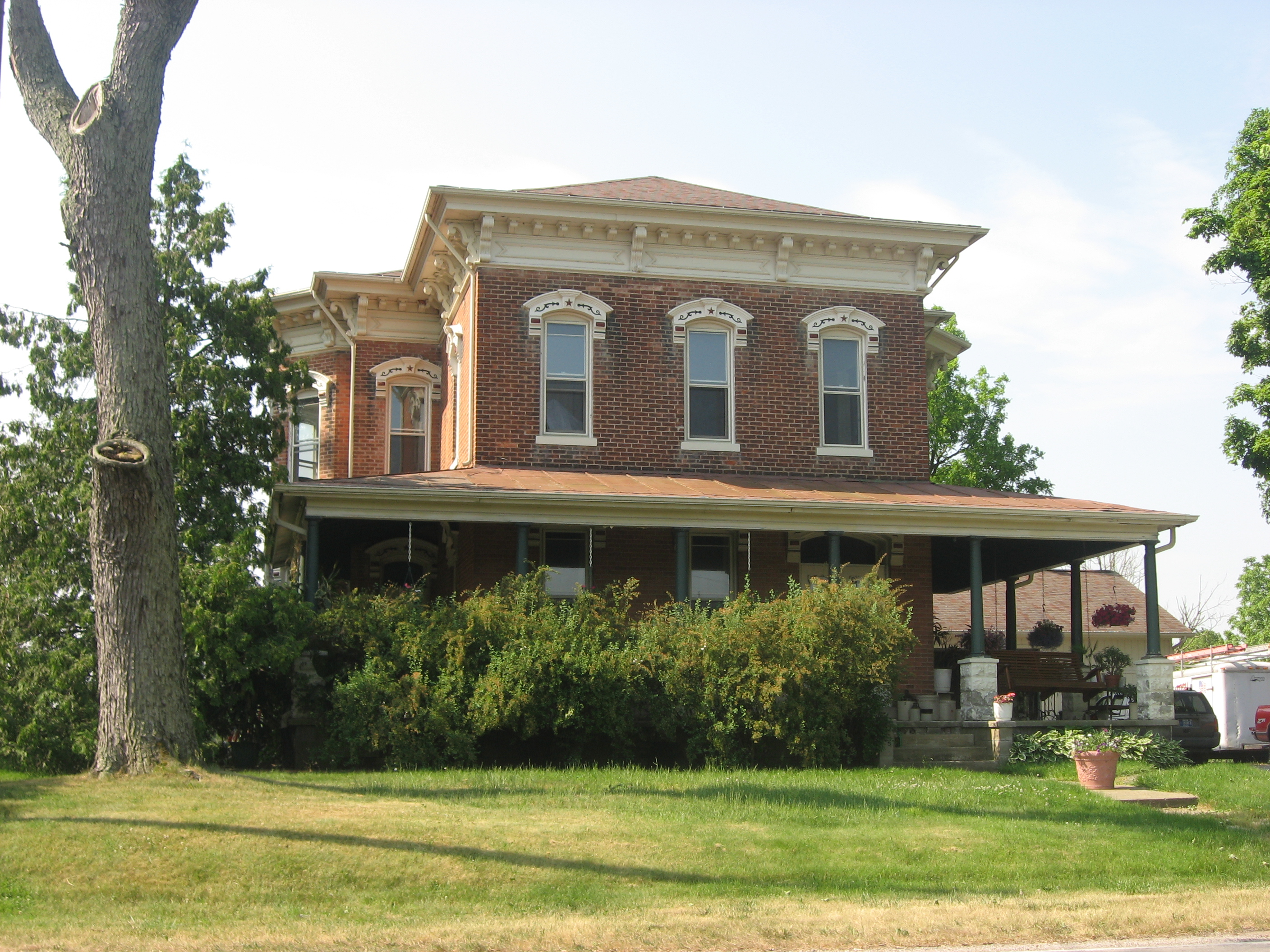
- The historic Christopher Souder House

- Logo

- Location of Larwill in Whitley County, Indiana.
- Coordinates: 41°10′47″N 85°37′30″W
- Country: United States
- State: Indiana
- County: Whitley
- Township: Richland

Area
  - Total: 0.18 sq mi (0.46 km^{2})
  - Land: 0.18 sq mi (0.46 km^{2})
  - Water: 0 sq mi (0.00 km^{2})
- Elevation: 961 ft (293 m)

Population (2020)
  - Total: 273
  - Density: 1,521.1/sq mi (587.31/km^{2})
- Time zone: UTC-5 (Eastern (EST))
  - Summer (DST): UTC-4 (EDT)
- ZIP code: 46764
- Area code: 260
- FIPS code: 18-42282
- GNIS feature ID: 2396709
- Website: townoflarwill.org

Larwill is a town in Richland Township, Whitley County, in the U.S. state of Indiana. The population was 273 at the 2020 census.

== History ==
Larwill was originally laid out and named Huntsville on November 13, 1854. On March 8, 1866, the town was renamed to Larwill in Honor of William and Joseph Larwill, who were railroad engineers. The Larwill post office had been in operation since 1866, but permanently closed in 2024.

The Dr. Christopher Souder House was listed on the National Register of Historic Places in 2005.

== Geography ==
According to the 2010 census, Larwill has a total area of 0.22 square miles (0.57 km^{2}), all land.

== Demographics ==
Historical population
Census	Pop.	Note	%±
1880	506		—
1920	264		—
1930	252		−4.5%
1940	319		26.6%
1950	316		−0.9%
1960	994		214.6%
1970	324		−67.4%
1980	286		−11.7%
1990	219		−23.4%
2000	282		28.8%
2010	283		0.4%
2020	273		−3.5%
U.S. Decennial Census

=== 2010 census ===
As of the census of 2010, there were 283 people, 100 households, and 69 families living in the town. The population density was 1,286.4 inhabitants per square mile (496.7/km^{2}). There were 125 housing units at an average density of 568.2 per square mile (219.4/km^{2}). The racial makeup of the town was 98.9% Non-Hispanic White and 1.1% from two or more races. There were 100 households, of which 33.0% had children under the age of 18 living with them, 41.0% were married couples living together, 16.0% had a female householder with no husband present, 12.0% had a male householder with no wife present, and 31.0% were non-families. 26.0% of all households were made up of individuals, and 13% had someone living alone who was 65 years of age or older. The average household size was 2.83 and the average family size was 3.36.

The median age in the town was 35.5 years. 26.1% of residents were under the age of 18; 12% were between the ages of 18 and 24; 23.3% were from 25 to 44; 27.6% were from 45 to 64; and 11% were 65 years of age or older. The gender makeup of the town was 49.1% male and 50.9% female.

=== 2000 census ===
As of the census of 2000, there were 282 people, 98 households, and 70 families living in the town. The population density was 1,266.9 inhabitants per square mile (489.2/km^{2}). There were 106 housing units at an average density of 476.2 per square mile (183.9/km^{2}). The racial makeup of the town was 98.94% White, 0.35% Asian, and 0.71% from two or more races.

There were 98 households, out of which 40.8% had children under the age of 18 living with them, 53.1% were married couples living together, 14.3% had a female householder with no husband present, and 27.6% were non-families. 24.5% of all households were made up of individuals, and 10.2% had someone living alone who was 65 years of age or older. The average household size was 2.88 and the average family size was 3.45.

In the town, the population was spread out, with 34.8% under the age of 18, 8.2% from 18 to 24, 32.3% from 25 to 44, 13.5% from 45 to 64, and 11.3% who were 65 years of age or older. The median age was 30 years. For every 100 females, there were 102.9 males. For every 100 females age 18 and over, there were 97.8 males.

The median income for a household in the town was $36,563, and the median income for a family was $40,556. Males had a median income of $29,167 versus $19,688 for females. The per capita income for the town was $13,154. About 13.2% of families and 10.7% of the population were below the poverty line, including 12.5% of those under the age of eighteen and 9.7% of those 65 or over.

== Gallery ==
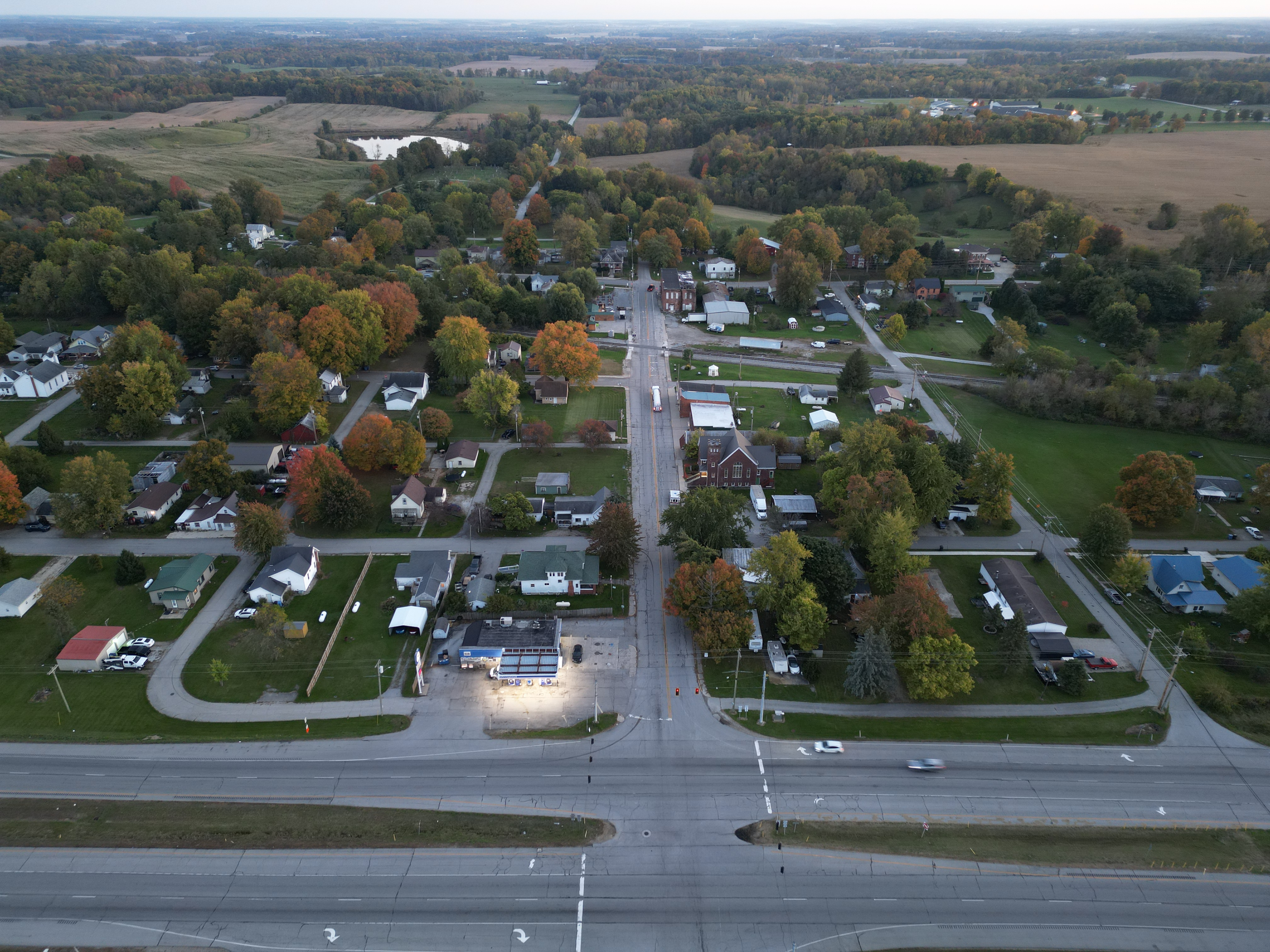
Looking South

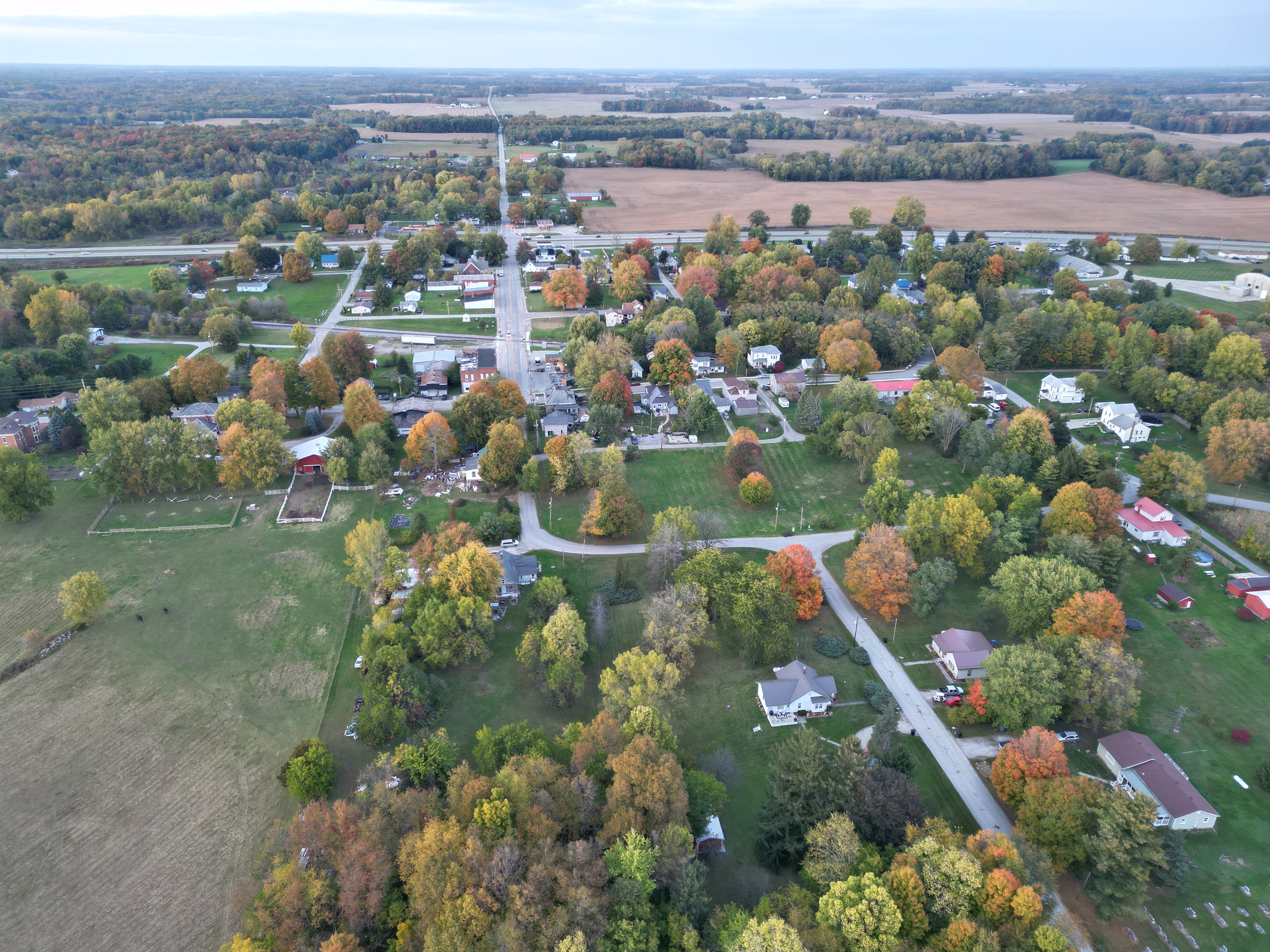
Looking North

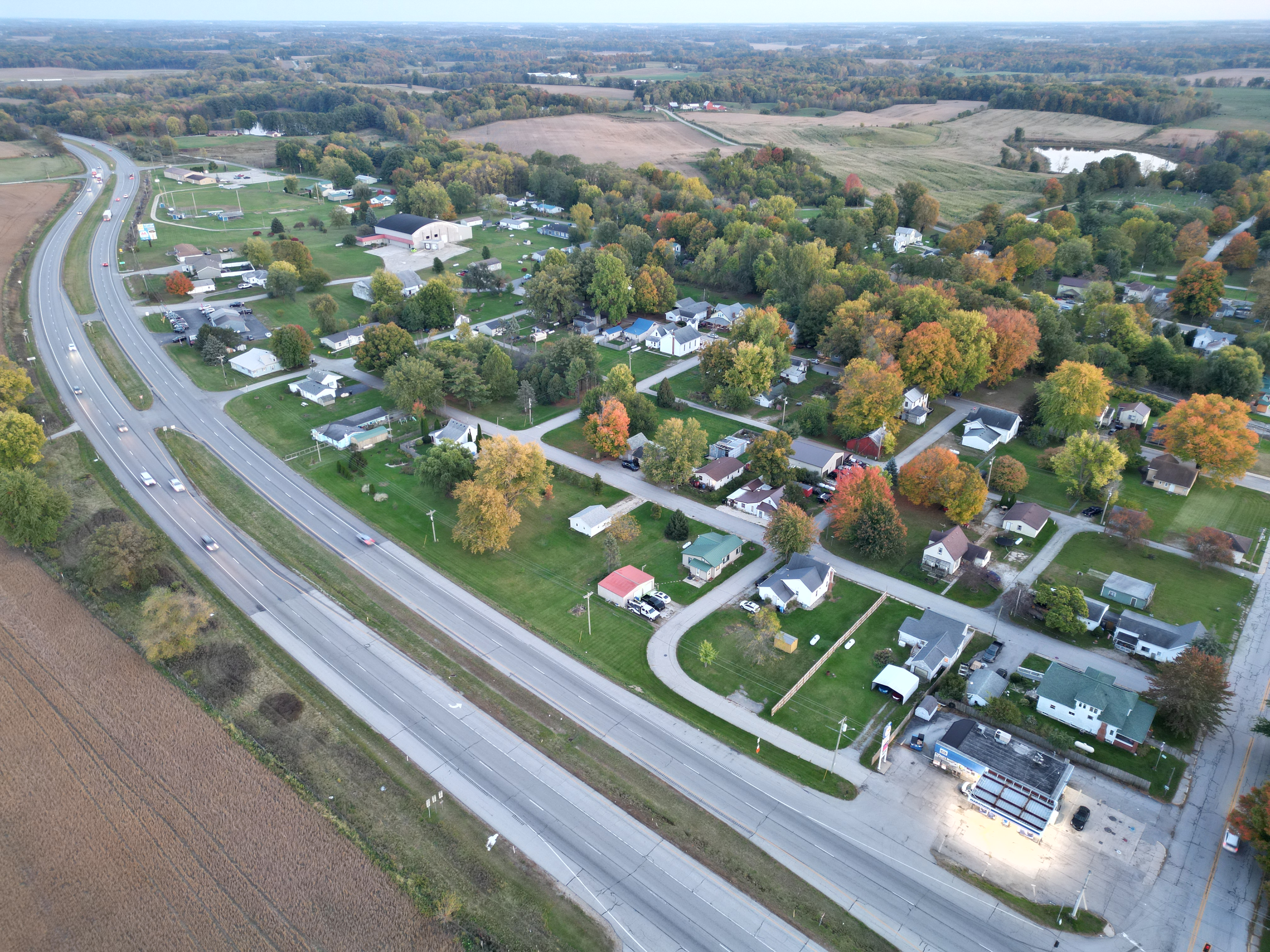
East Side of Larwill

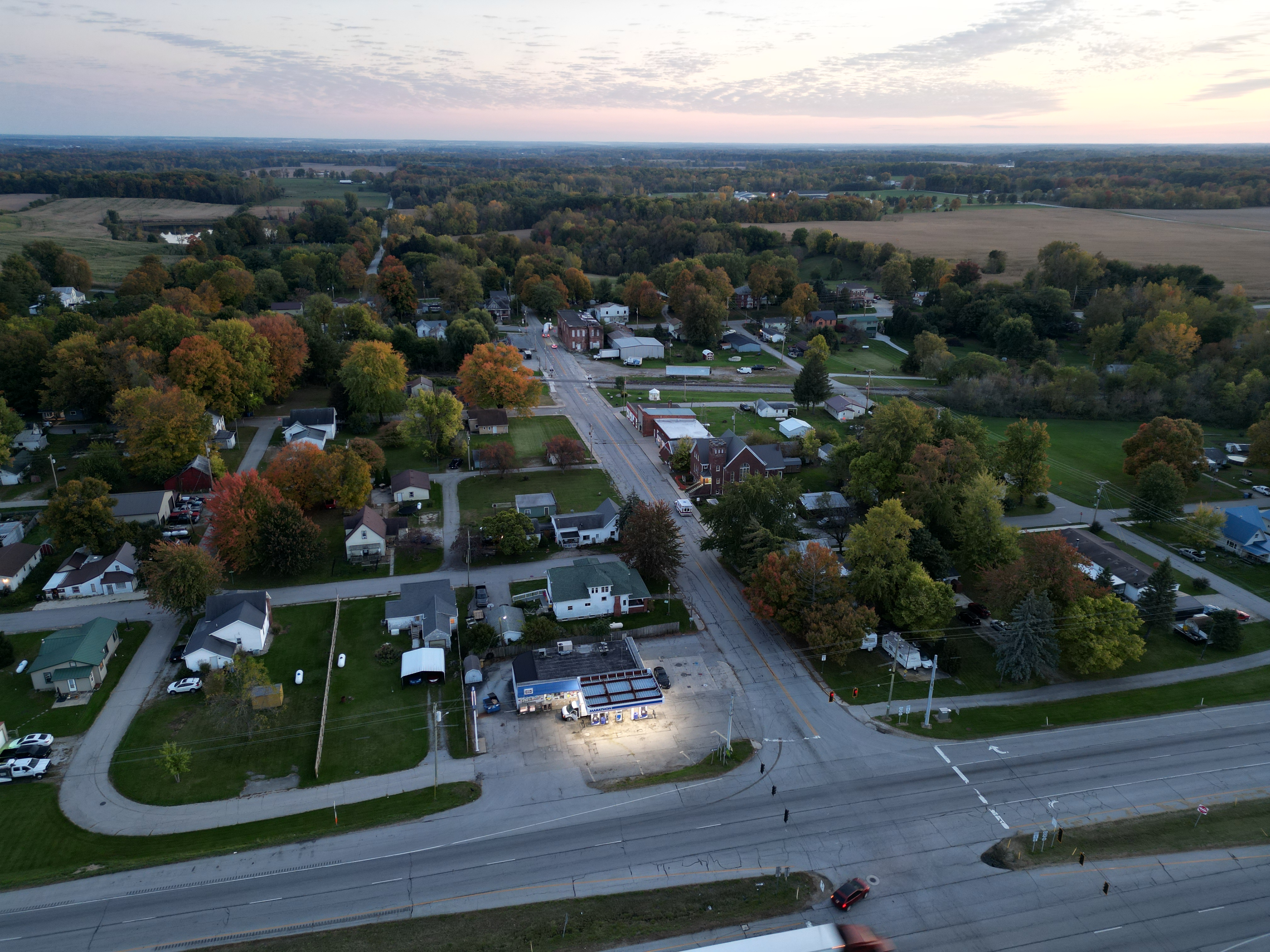
West Side of Larwill

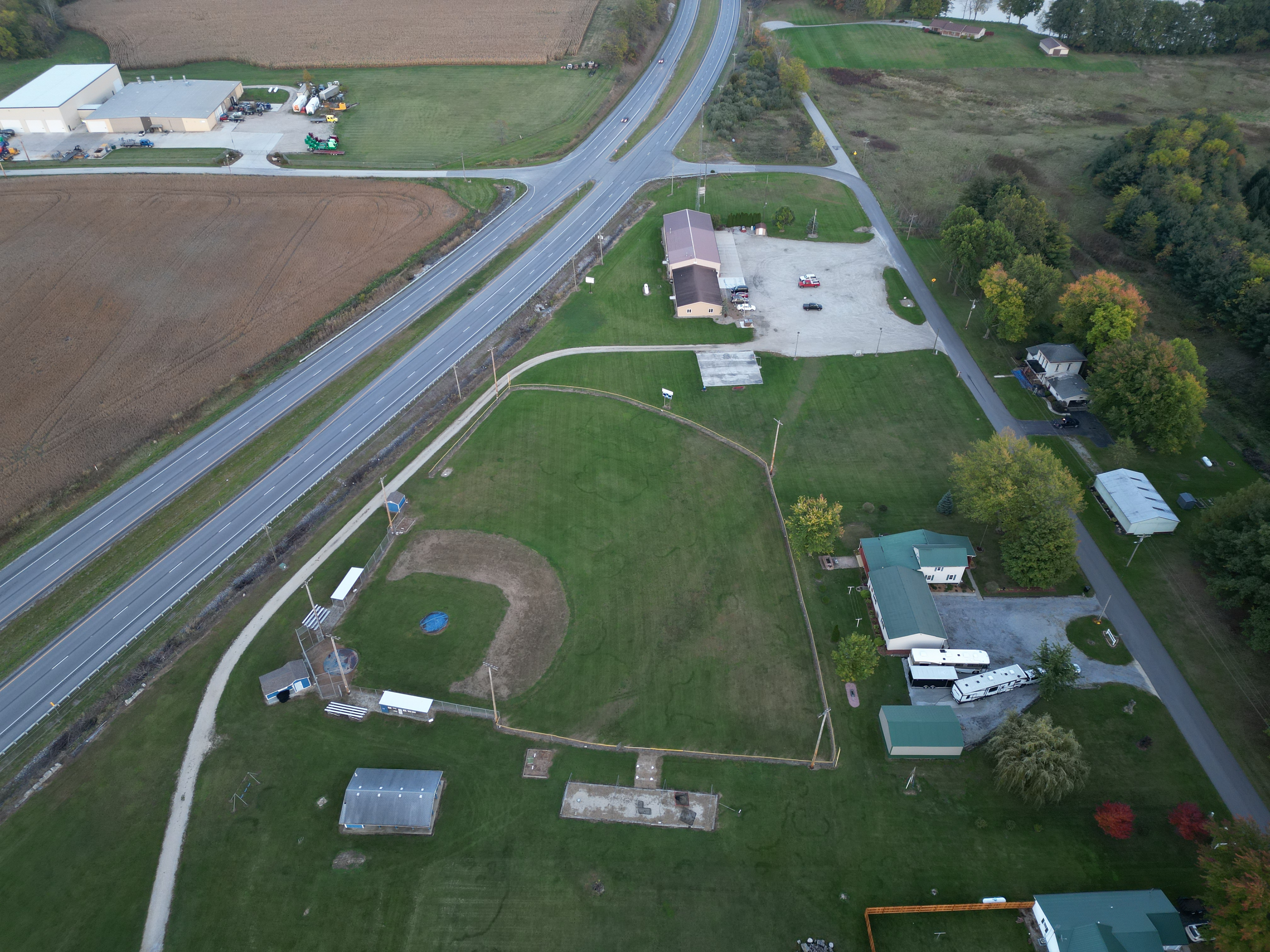
Fire Department & Ballpark

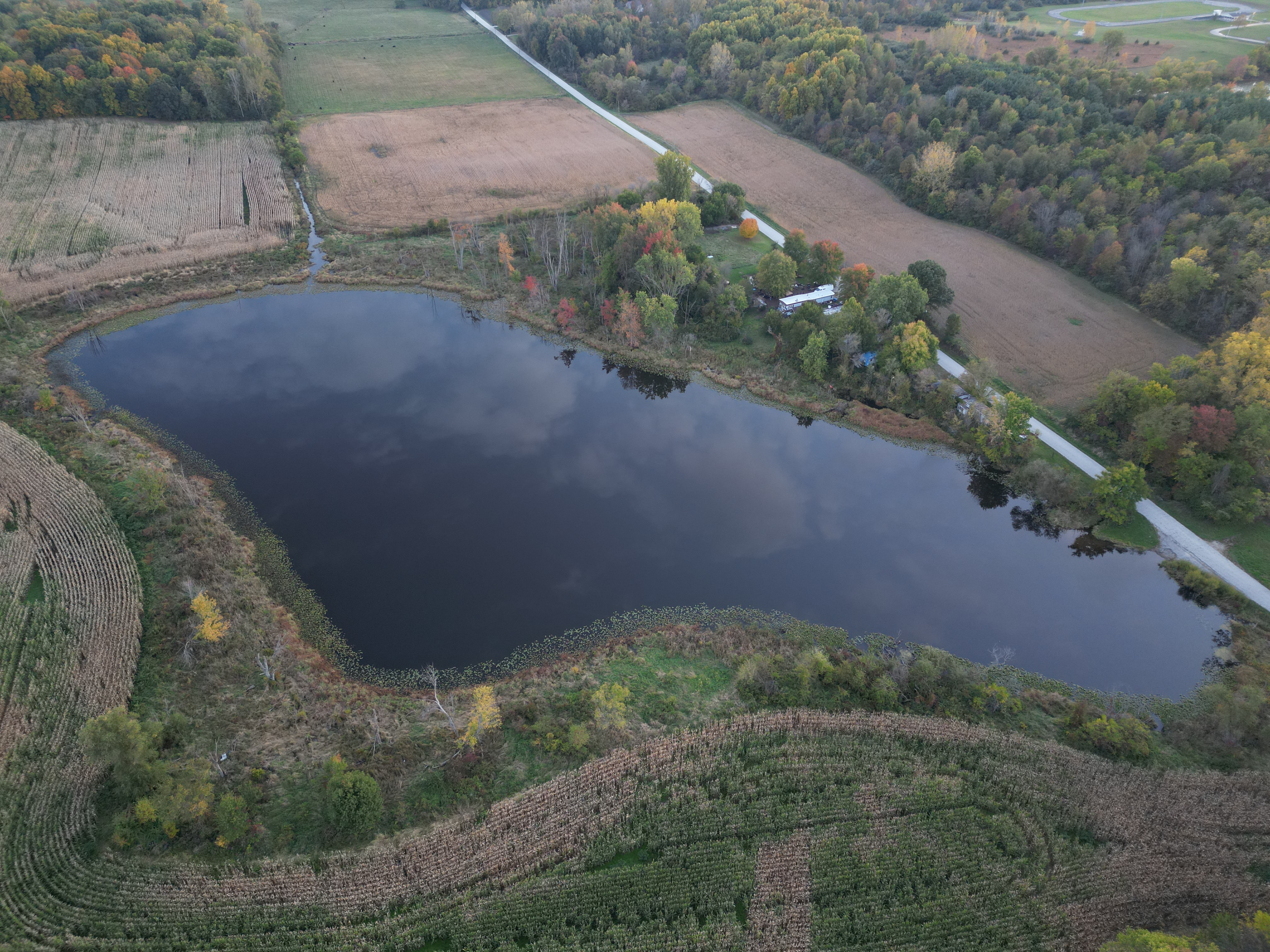
Larwill Lake

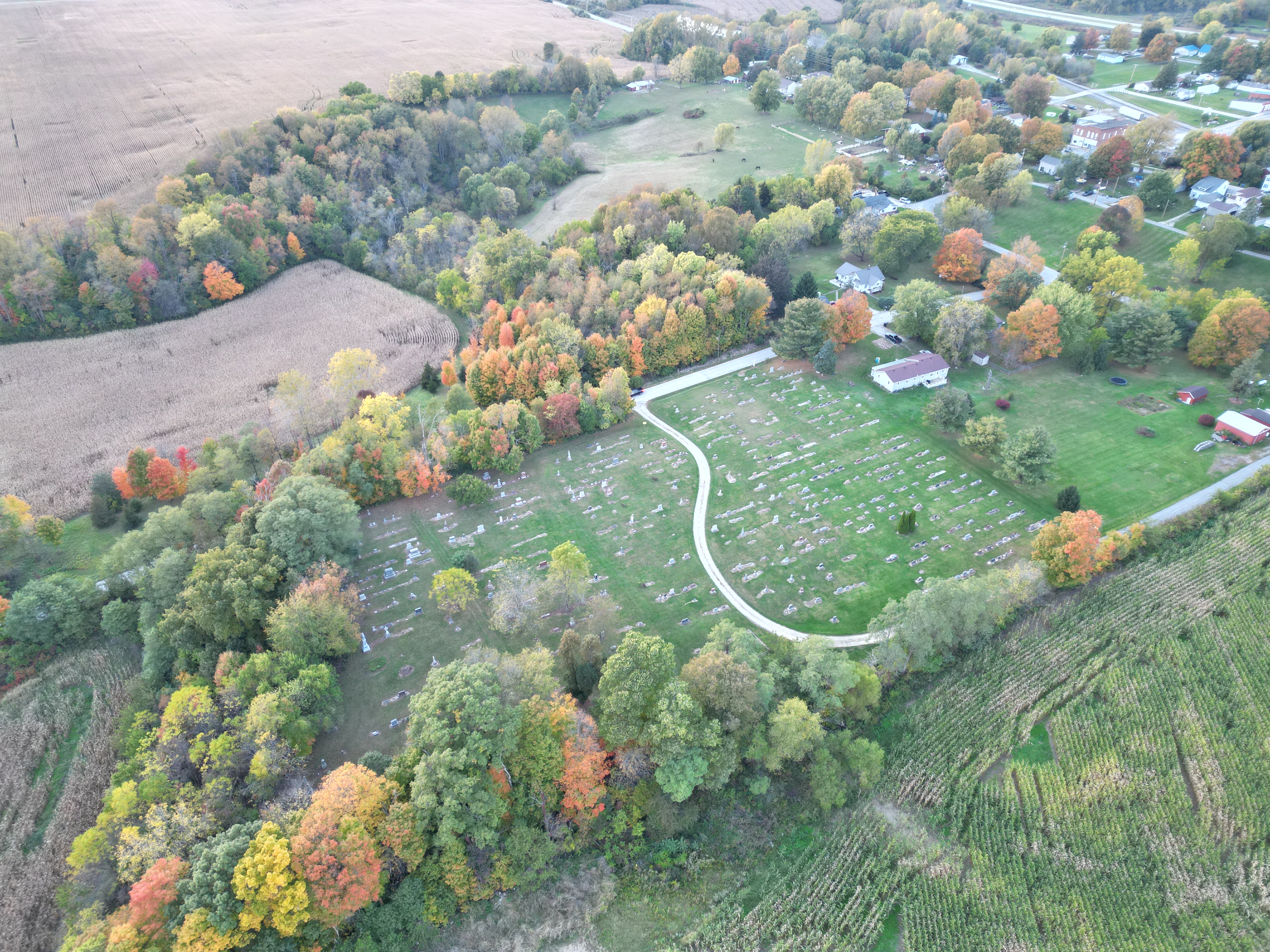
Larwill Cemetery

== Notable natives ==
- Jill Long Thompson, former U.S. Representative, former candidate for Governor of Indiana
