= Ellisville, Indiana =

- Unincorporated community
- Location within Indiana Location within the United States
- Coordinates: 41°01′05″N 85°17′03″W
- Country: United States
- State: Indiana
- County: Allen
- Township: Aboite
- Elevation: 814 ft (248 m)
- Time zone: UTC-5 (Eastern (EST))
  - Summer (DST): UTC-4 (EDT)
- ZIP code: 46814
- Area code: 260
- GNIS feature ID: 434114

Ellisville is an unincorporated community in Aboite Township, Allen County, in the U.S. state of Indiana.
