= Dr. Christopher Souder House =

Historic house in Indiana, United States

- U.S. National Register of Historic Places
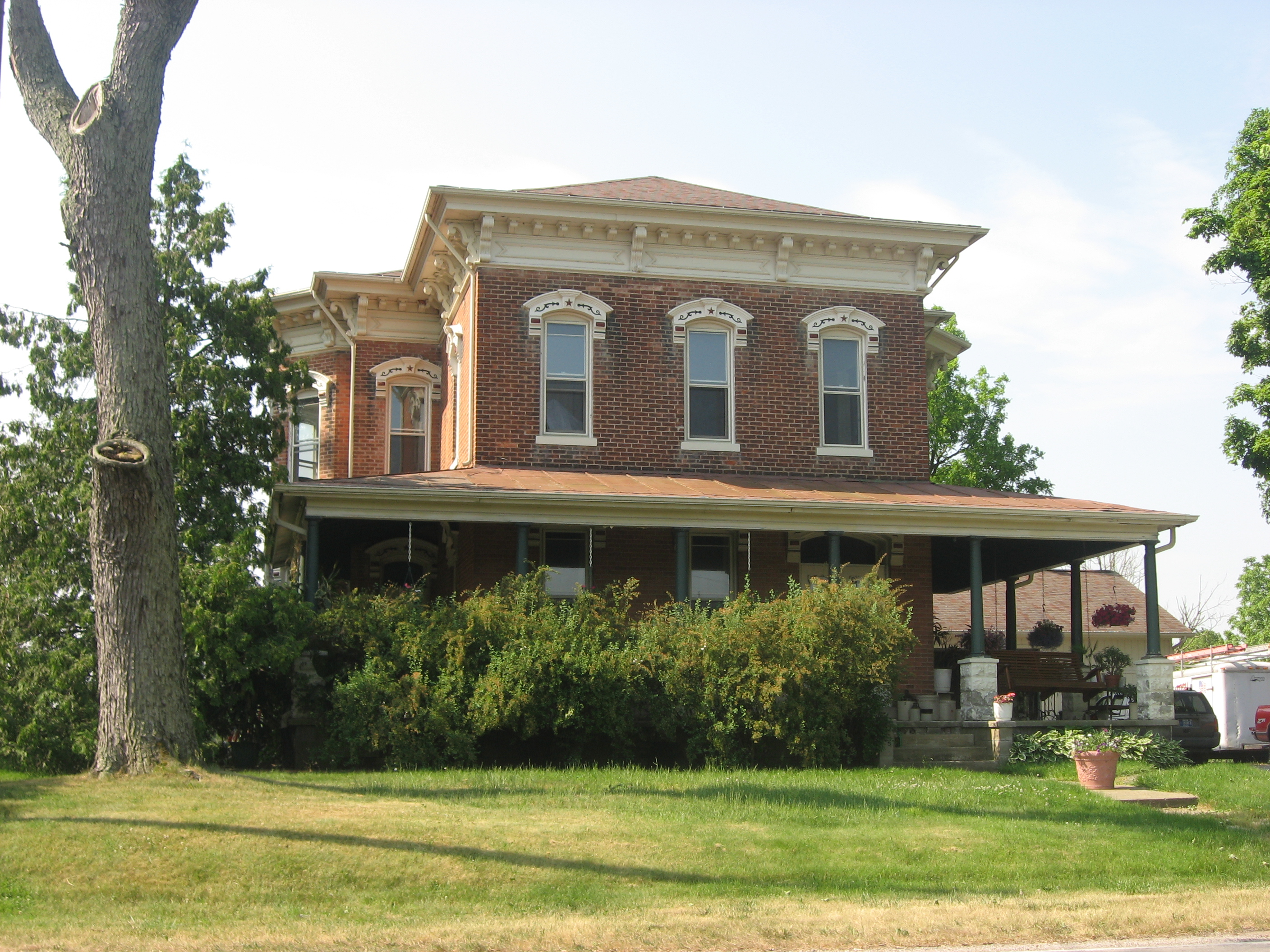
- Dr. Christopher Souder House, May 2012

- Location within Indiana Location within the United States
- Location: 214 W. Main St., Larwill, Indiana
- Coordinates: 41°10′41″N 85°37′39″W
- Area: less than one acre
- Built: 1877
- Architectural style: Italianate
- NRHP reference No.: 05000315
- Added to NRHP: April 20, 2005

Dr. Christopher Souder House is a historic home located at Larwill, Indiana. It was built in 1877, and is a two-story, cross plan, Italianate style brick dwelling. It has a shallow hipped roof with overhanging eaves. It features a wraparound porch and segmental arched windows with decorative pressed metal hoods.

It was listed on the National Register of Historic Places in 2005.
