= Smith Township, Whitley County, Indiana =

Smith Township
- Township
- Location in Whitley County
- Coordinates: 41°13′22″N 85°22′05″W
- Country: United States
- State: Indiana
- County: Whitley

Government
  - Type: Indiana township

Area
  - Total: 35.3 sq mi (91 km^{2})
  - Land: 34.93 sq mi (90.5 km^{2})
  - Water: 0.37 sq mi (0.96 km^{2}) 1.05%
- Elevation: 856 ft (261 m)

Population (2020)
  - Total: 5,234
  - Density: 152.5/sq mi (58.9/km^{2})
- Time zone: UTC-5 (Eastern (EST))
  - Summer (DST): UTC-4 (EDT)
- Area code: 260
- GNIS feature ID: 453853

Smith Township is one of nine townships in Whitley County, Indiana, United States. As of the 2020 census, its population was 5,234 (down from 5,327 at 2010) and it contained 2,319 housing units.

== Geography ==
According to the 2010 census, the township has a total area of 35.3 square miles (91 km^{2}), of which 34.93 square miles (90.5 km^{2}) (or 98.95%) is land and 0.37 square miles (0.96 km^{2}) (or 1.05%) is water. Lakes in this township include Blue Lake, Devil Lake, Devils Lake and Little Lake. The stream of Mud Run runs through this township.

=== Cities and towns ===
- Churubusco

=== Unincorporated towns ===
- Blue Lake
- Collins

(This list is based on USGS data and may include former settlements.)

=== Adjacent townships ===
- Green Township, Noble County (north)
- Swan Township, Noble County (northeast)
- Eel River Township, Allen County (east)
- Lake Township, Allen County (southeast)
- Union Township (south)
- Thorncreek Township (west)
- Noble Township, Noble County (northwest)

=== Cemeteries ===
The township contains three cemeteries: Concord, Garrison and Jeffries.

=== Major highways ===
- U.S. Route 33
- Indiana State Road 205

== Education ==
Smith Township residents may obtain a free library card from the Churubusco Public Library.
