= Monroe Township, Kosciusko County, Indiana =

Monroe Township
- Township
- Coordinates: 41°08′46″N 85°44′35″W
- Country: United States
- State: Indiana
- County: Kosciusko

Government
  - Type: Indiana township

Area
  - Total: 24.31 sq mi (63.0 km^{2})
  - Land: 23.85 sq mi (61.8 km^{2})
  - Water: 0.46 sq mi (1.2 km^{2})
- Elevation: 909 ft (277 m)

Population (2020)
  - Total: 1,120
  - Density: 48.1/sq mi (18.6/km^{2})
- Time zone: UTC-5 (Eastern (EST))
  - Summer (DST): UTC-4 (EDT)
- FIPS code: 18-50364
- GNIS feature ID: 453641

Monroe Township is one of seventeen townships in Kosciusko County, Indiana. As of the 2020 census, its population was 1,120 (down from 1,147 at 2010) and it contained 458 housing units.

Monroe Township was organized in 1855.

== Geography ==
According to the 2010 census, the township has a total area of 24.31 square miles (63.0 km^{2}), of which 23.85 square miles (61.8 km^{2}) (or 98.11%) is land and 0.46 square miles (1.2 km^{2}) (or 1.89%) is water.
