= Lake Everett (Indiana) =

Lake in Indiana, United States

- Location within Indiana Location within the United States
- Location: Allen County, Indiana, United States
- Coordinates: 41°09′18″N 85°18′51″W
- Basin countries: United States
- Surface area: 42 acres (17 ha)
- Surface elevation: 833 ft (254 m)

Lake Everett is a lake in Allen County, Indiana, United States. The lake is about 42 acres (17 ha). Most the land surrounding land is privately owned with several small and a few larger cottages located on the lake proper. The Indiana Department of Natural Resources maintains a beach, dock, and boat ramp on the lake. Lake Everett is held to be one of the area's best pan fishing locations. The lake is roughly twelve miles from Fort Wayne, Indiana.

Lake Everett was named for Charles Everett, an early landowner.
