= Whitley County, Indiana =

County in Indiana, United States

- County
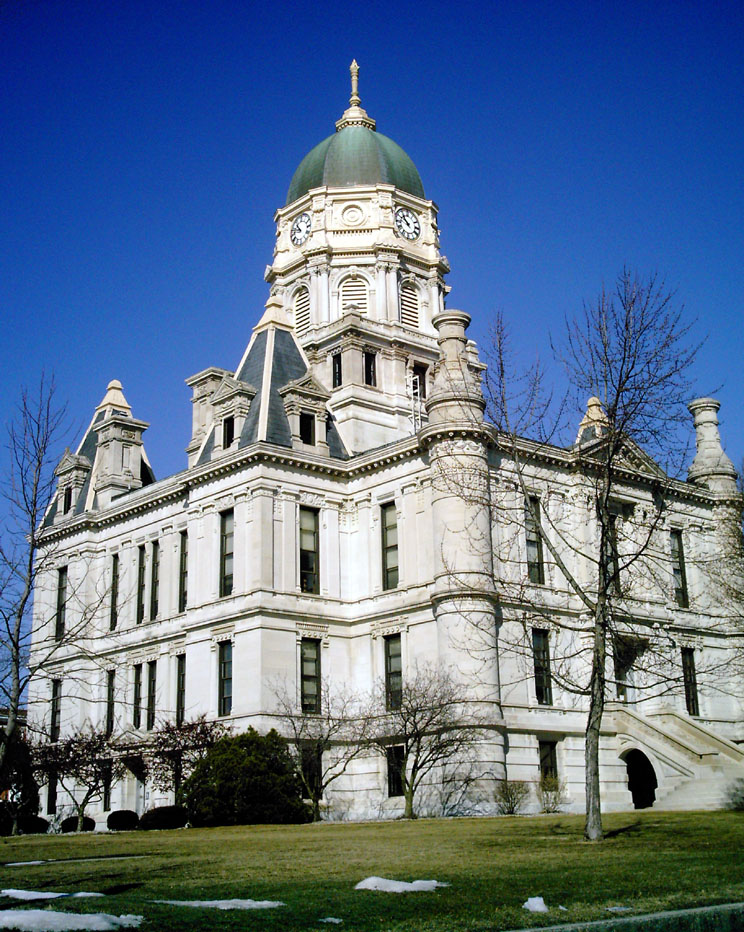
- Whitley County Courthouse in Columbia City

- Seal

- Location within the U.S. state of Indiana
- Coordinates: 41°08′N 85°30′W
- Country: United States
- State: Indiana
- Founded: February 7, 1835 (authorized); 1838 (organized)
- Named for: William Whitley
- Seat: Columbia City
- Largest city: Columbia City

Area
  - Total: 337.91 sq mi (875.2 km^{2})
  - Land: 335.57 sq mi (869.1 km^{2})
  - Water: 2.34 sq mi (6.1 km^{2}) 0.69%

Population (2020)
  - Total: 34,191
  - Estimate (2025): 35,046 ▲
  - Density: 101.89/sq mi (39.340/km^{2})
- Time zone: UTC−5 (Eastern)
  - Summer (DST): UTC−4 (EDT)
- Congressional district: 3rd
- Website: whitleycounty.in.gov
- Indiana county number 92; Last alphabetical county in Indiana.

Whitley County is a rural county in the U.S. state of Indiana. As of the 2020 United States census, the population was 34,191. Whitley County is the 49th most populous county in Indiana. The county seat (and only incorporated city) is Columbia City. The county has the highest county number (92) on Indiana license plates, as it is alphabetically the last in the state's list of counties. It is part of the Fort Wayne Metropolitan Statistical Area and the Fort Wayne–Huntington–Auburn Combined Statistical Area.

== History ==
Indiana was granted statehood near the end of 1816. On February 7, 1835, the state legislature approved an omnibus bill that authorized the creation of thirteen counties, including Whitley. It was named for Col. William Whitley, who was killed in the Battle of the Thames in the War of 1812.

The first non-Native American settlers arrived in the area during that year, as a result of the end of the Black Hawk War and the completion of the Erie Canal. They were from New England - "Yankee" settlers, descendants of the English Puritans who settled New England in the colonial era. They were primarily members of the Congregational Church. However, due to the Second Great Awakening, many of them had converted to Methodism and some had become Baptists before coming to Indiana. Whitley County government was organized in 1838.

In the late 1870s, immigrants began arriving from Germany and Ireland.

== Geography ==
Prior to white settlement, Whitley County's low rolling hills were densely forested, and dotted with lakes across its northern portion. At present, the available land is mostly deforested and is entirely devoted to agriculture or urban development. Its highest point (approx. 1,000 ft; 300 m ASL) is a small rise NE of Cedar Lake. The Eel River flows southwestward through the lower part of the county, and the Blue River flows southwestward through the upper part.

According to the 2010 United States census, the county has a total area of 337.91 square miles (875.2 km^{2}), of which 335.57 square miles (869.1 km^{2}) (or 99.31%) is land and 2.34 square miles (6.1 km^{2}) (or 0.69%) is water.

=== Adjacent counties ===
- Noble County - north
- Allen County - east
- Huntington County - south
- Wabash County - southwest
- Kosciusko County - west

=== City and towns ===
- Columbia City (city/county seat)
- Churubusco
- Larwill
- South Whitley

=== Census-designated place ===
- Tri-Lakes

=== Unincorporated places ===
- Blue Lake
- Briggs
- Coesse
- Coesse Corners
- Collamer
- Collins
- Dunfee
- Etna
- Five Points
- Laud
- Lorane
- Luther
- Peabody
- Raber
- Saturn
- Tunker
- Washington Center

=== Townships ===
- Cleveland
- Columbia
- Etna-Troy
- Jefferson
- Richland
- Smith
- Thorncreek
- Union
- Washington

=== Lakes ===
- Blue Lake
- Brown Lake
- Cedar Lake
- Crooked Lake (part)
- Dollar Lake
- Goose Lake
- Indian Lake
- Little Cedar Lake
- Loon Lake (part)
- Mud Lake
- New Lake
- Old Lake
- Rine Lake
- Robinson Lake (part)
- Round Lake
- Scott Lake
- Shriner Lake
- Tadpole Lake
- Troy Cedar Lake
- Winters Lake

=== Protected areas ===
- Deniston Resource Area
- Goose Lake Wetland Conservation Area
- Pisgah Marsh Nongame Area (part)

=== Major highways ===
- U.S. Route 24
- U.S. Route 30
- U.S. Route 33
- Indiana State Road 5
- Indiana State Road 9
- Indiana State Road 14
- Indiana State Road 105
- Indiana State Road 109
- Indiana State Road 114
- Indiana State Road 205

== Climate and weather ==
Columbia City, Indiana

Climate chart (precipitation, max. and min. temperature)
J	F	M	A	M	J	J	A	S	O	N	D
2.1 31 14	1.8 35 18	2.9 46 27	3.7 58 37	3.7 70 48	4.4 79 58	3.8 83 62	3.6 81 59	3.5 74 51	2.8 62 40	3.3 48 31	2.9 36 21
- █ Average max. and min. temperatures in °F
- █ Precipitation totals in inches
- Source: The Weather Channel
Metric conversion
J	F	M	A	M	J	J	A	S	O	N	D
54 −1 −10	46 2 −8	74 8 −3	93 14 3	94 21 9	113 26 14	97 28 17	91 27 15	89 23 11	71 17 4	84 9 −1	73 2 −6
- █ Average max. and min. temperatures in °C
- █ Precipitation totals in mm

In recent years, the average temperatures in Columbia City have ranged from a low of 14 °F (−10 °C) in January to a high of 83 °F (28 °C) in July, although a record low of −24 °F (−31 °C) was recorded in January 1994, and a record high of 103 °F (39 °C) was recorded in June 1988. Average monthly precipitation ranged from 1.80 inches (46 mm) in February to 4.44 inches (113 mm) in June.

== Government ==
The county government is a constitutional body and is granted specific powers by the Constitution of Indiana and by the Indiana Code.

County Council: The legislative branch of the county government; controls spending and revenue collection in the county. Representatives are elected to four-year terms from county districts. They set salaries, the annual budget, and special spending. The council has limited authority to impose local taxes, in the form of an income and property tax that is subject to state-level approval, excise taxes, and service taxes.

Board of Commissioners: The executive body of the county; commissioners are elected to four-year staggered terms in county-wide elections. One commissioner serves as president. The commissioners execute the acts legislated by the council, collect revenue, and manage the county government.

Court: The county maintains a small claims court that handles civil cases. The judge on the court is elected to a term of four years and must be a member of the Indiana bar. The judge is assisted by a constable who is also elected to a four-year term. In some cases, court decisions can be appealed to the state-level circuit court.

County Officials: The county has other officers elected to four-year terms, including sheriff, coroner, auditor, treasurer, recorder, surveyor, and circuit court clerk. Members elected to county government positions are required to declare party affiliations and to be residents of the county.

Whitely County is part of Indiana's 3rd congressional district, and as of 2025, is represented by Republican Marlin Stutzman in the United States Congress.

United States presidential election results for Whitley County, Indiana
Year	Republican		Democratic		Third party(ies)	
Year	No.	%	No.	%	No.	%
1888	2,133	46.18%	2,325	50.34%	161	3.49%
1892	1,958	44.55%	2,234	50.83%	203	4.62%
1896	2,242	46.85%	2,494	52.12%	49	1.02%
1900	2,271	47.77%	2,361	49.66%	122	2.57%
1904	2,359	48.99%	2,281	47.37%	175	3.63%
1908	2,302	46.57%	2,493	50.43%	148	2.99%
1912	1,082	24.01%	2,206	48.96%	1,218	27.03%
1916	2,191	44.69%	2,510	51.19%	202	4.12%
1920	4,530	52.50%	3,929	45.53%	170	1.97%
1924	4,420	54.84%	3,484	43.23%	156	1.94%
1928	4,519	57.43%	3,294	41.86%	56	0.71%
1932	3,471	39.21%	5,058	57.13%	324	3.66%
1936	3,959	43.27%	5,115	55.90%	76	0.83%
1940	5,100	53.34%	4,404	46.06%	57	0.60%
1944	5,268	55.88%	4,079	43.27%	80	0.85%
1948	4,715	51.88%	4,240	46.65%	134	1.47%
1952	5,893	60.28%	3,755	38.41%	128	1.31%
1956	6,422	63.23%	3,688	36.31%	47	0.46%
1960	6,621	60.50%	4,266	38.98%	56	0.51%
1964	4,896	45.56%	5,798	53.95%	53	0.49%
1968	5,684	53.27%	3,848	36.06%	1,139	10.67%
1972	7,489	65.67%	3,838	33.65%	77	0.68%
1976	6,761	54.34%	5,445	43.77%	235	1.89%
1980	7,146	55.74%	4,497	35.08%	1,178	9.19%
1984	7,763	67.21%	3,690	31.95%	98	0.85%
1988	7,679	67.44%	3,642	31.99%	65	0.57%
1992	5,217	43.27%	3,569	29.60%	3,270	27.12%
1996	5,965	51.31%	4,176	35.92%	1,484	12.77%
2000	8,080	64.99%	4,107	33.04%	245	1.97%
2004	9,512	70.56%	3,880	28.78%	89	0.66%
2008	9,124	59.99%	5,862	38.55%	222	1.46%
2012	10,258	68.24%	4,420	29.40%	354	2.35%
2016	11,358	72.07%	3,379	21.44%	1,022	6.49%
2020	12,862	73.13%	4,234	24.07%	492	2.80%
2024	13,122	73.83%	4,275	24.05%	377	2.12%

== Demographics ==
Historical population
Census	Pop.	Note	%±
1840	1,237		—
1850	5,190		319.6%
1860	10,730		106.7%
1870	14,399		34.2%
1880	16,941		17.7%
1890	17,768		4.9%
1900	17,328		−2.5%
1910	16,892		−2.5%
1920	15,660		−7.3%
1930	15,931		1.7%
1940	17,001		6.7%
1950	18,828		10.7%
1960	20,954		11.3%
1970	23,395		11.6%
1980	26,215		12.1%
1990	27,651		5.5%
2000	30,707		11.1%
2010	33,292		8.4%
2020	34,191		2.7%
2025 (est.)	35,046	▲	2.5%
US Decennial Census; 1790-1960 1900-1990; 1990-2000 2010-2013 2017

=== Racial and ethnic composition ===
Whitley County, Indiana – Racial and ethnic composition Note: the US Census treats Hispanic/Latino as an ethnic category. This table excludes Latinos from the racial categories and assigns them to a separate category. Hispanics/Latinos may be of any race.
Race / Ethnicity (NH = Non-Hispanic)	Pop 1980	Pop 1990	Pop 2000	Pop 2010	Pop 2020	% 1980	% 1990	% 2000	% 2010	% 2020
White alone (NH)	25,976	27,383	30,040	32,147	31,832	99.09%	99.03%	97.83%	96.56%	93.10%
Black or African American alone (NH)	9	28	57	96	150	0.03%	0.10%	0.19%	0.29%	0.44%
Native American or Alaska Native alone (NH)	45	70	104	76	91	0.17%	0.25%	0.34%	0.23%	0.27%
Asian alone (NH)	44	37	55	105	173	0.17%	0.13%	0.18%	0.32%	0.51%
Native Hawaiian or Pacific Islander alone (NH)	x	x	12	7	3	x	x	0.04%	0.02%	0.01%
Other race alone (NH)	8	7	11	22	78	0.03%	0.03%	0.04%	0.07%	0.23%
Mixed race or Multiracial (NH)	x	x	152	324	1,023	x	x	0.50%	0.97%	2.99%
Hispanic or Latino (any race)	133	126	276	515	841	0.51%	0.46%	0.90%	1.55%	2.46%
Total	26,215	27,651	30,707	33,292	34,191	100.00%	100.00%	100.00%	100.00%	100.00%

=== 2020 census ===
As of the 2020 census, the county had a population of 34,191. The median age was 41.8 years. 22.9% of residents were under the age of 18 and 18.5% of residents were 65 years of age or older. For every 100 females there were 98.4 males, and for every 100 females age 18 and over there were 97.0 males age 18 and over.

The racial makeup of the county was 94.0% White, 0.5% Black or African American, 0.3% American Indian and Alaska Native, 0.5% Asian, <0.1% Native Hawaiian and Pacific Islander, 0.8% from some other race, and 3.9% from two or more races. Hispanic or Latino residents of any race comprised 2.5% of the population.

30.9% of residents lived in urban areas, while 69.1% lived in rural areas.

There were 13,857 households in the county, of which 29.4% had children under the age of 18 living in them. Of all households, 54.1% were married-couple households, 17.4% were households with a male householder and no spouse or partner present, and 21.8% were households with a female householder and no spouse or partner present. About 27.2% of all households were made up of individuals and 12.5% had someone living alone who was 65 years of age or older.

There were 14,837 housing units, of which 6.6% were vacant. Among occupied housing units, 80.8% were owner-occupied and 19.2% were renter-occupied. The homeowner vacancy rate was 0.7% and the rental vacancy rate was 6.2%.

=== 2010 census ===
As of the 2010 United States census, there were 33,292 people, 13,001 households, and 9,228 families in the county. The population density was 99.2 inhabitants per square mile (38.3/km^{2}). There were 14,281 housing units at an average density of 42.6 per square mile (16.4/km^{2}). The racial makeup of the county was 97.6% white, 0.3% Asian, 0.3% American Indian, 0.3% black or African American, 0.4% from other races, and 1.1% from two or more races. Those of Hispanic or Latino origin made up 1.5% of the population. In terms of ancestry, 38.2% were German, 12.6% were Irish, 12.5% were American, and 9.3% were English.

Of the 13,001 households, 32.5% had children under the age of 18 living with them, 57.4% were married couples living together, 9.2% had a female householder with no husband present, 29.0% were non-families, and 24.1% of all households were made up of individuals. The average household size was 2.53 and the average family size was 2.99. The median age was 40.1 years.

The median income for a household in the county was $47,697, and the median income for a family was $63,487. Males had a median income of $44,883 versus $30,724 for females. The per capita income for the county was $24,644. About 5.1% of families and 6.8% of the population were below the poverty line, including 7.2% of those under age 18 and 7.6% of those age 65 or over.

== See also ==
- National Register of Historic Places listings in Whitley County, Indiana
