= Columbia City, Indiana =

- City
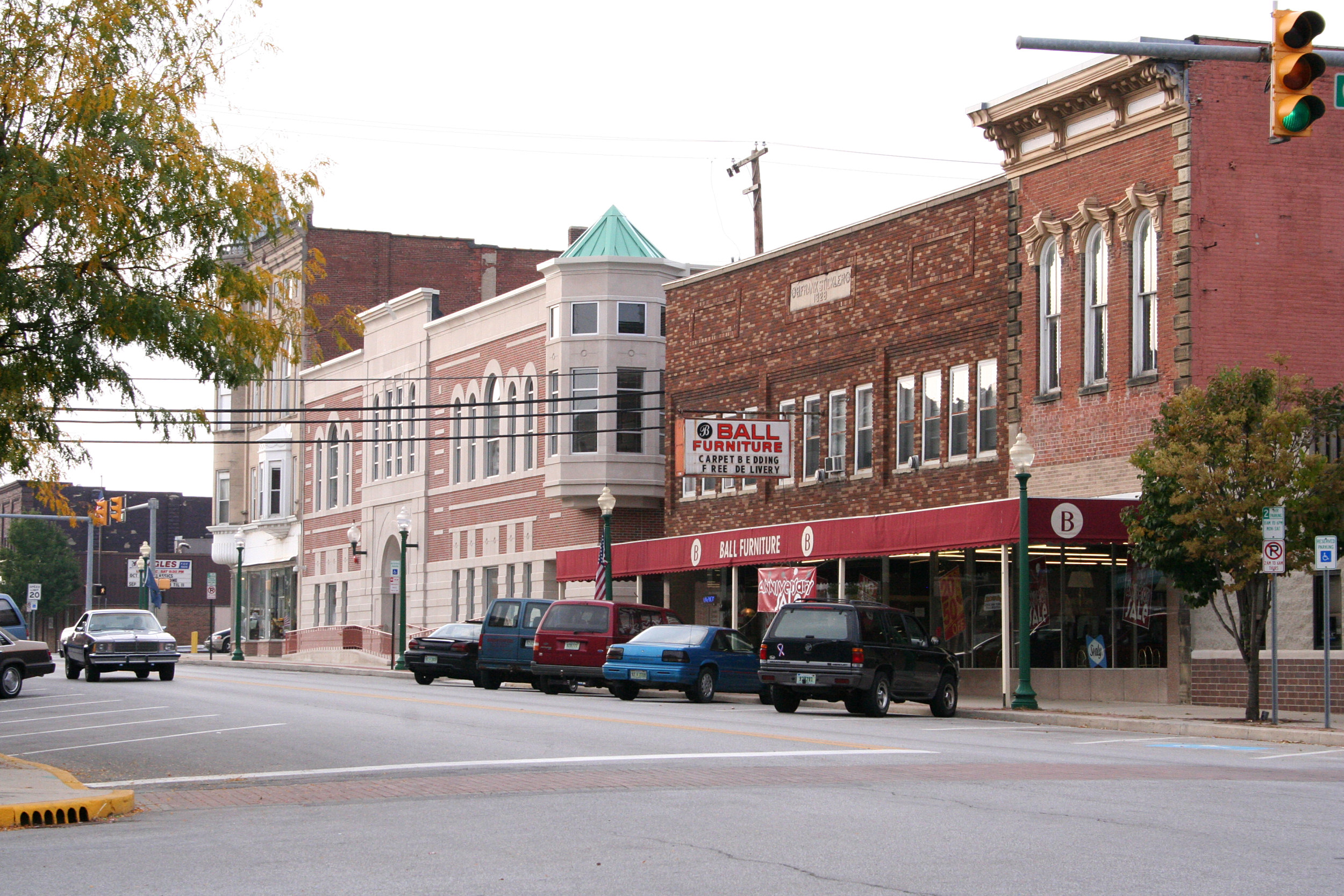
- Downtown Columbia City

- Flag Seal Logo

- Location of Columbia City in Whitley County, Indiana.
- Coordinates: 41°09′45″N 85°29′50″W
- Country: United States
- State: Indiana
- County: Whitley
- Township: Columbia
- Established: 1839

Government
  - Type: Mayor-council government
  - Mayor: Ryan Daniel (R)

Area
  - Total: 5.47 sq mi (14.17 km^{2})
  - Land: 5.45 sq mi (14.12 km^{2})
  - Water: 0.019 sq mi (0.05 km^{2})
- Elevation: 869 ft (265 m)

Population (2020)
  - Total: 9,892
  - Density: 1,813.9/sq mi (700.34/km^{2})
- Time zone: UTC-5 (EST)
  - Summer (DST): UTC-4 (EDT)
- ZIP code: 46725
- Area code: 260
- FIPS code: 18-14716
- GNIS feature ID: 2393606
- Website: www.columbiacity.net

Columbia City is a city in Columbia Township, Whitley County, Indiana, United States. The population was 9,892 at the 2020 Census, up from 8,750 at the 2010 Census, estimated to be 10,064 in 2023. The city is the county seat of Whitley County, and is the largest community therein. It is part of the Fort Wayne MSA.

== History ==
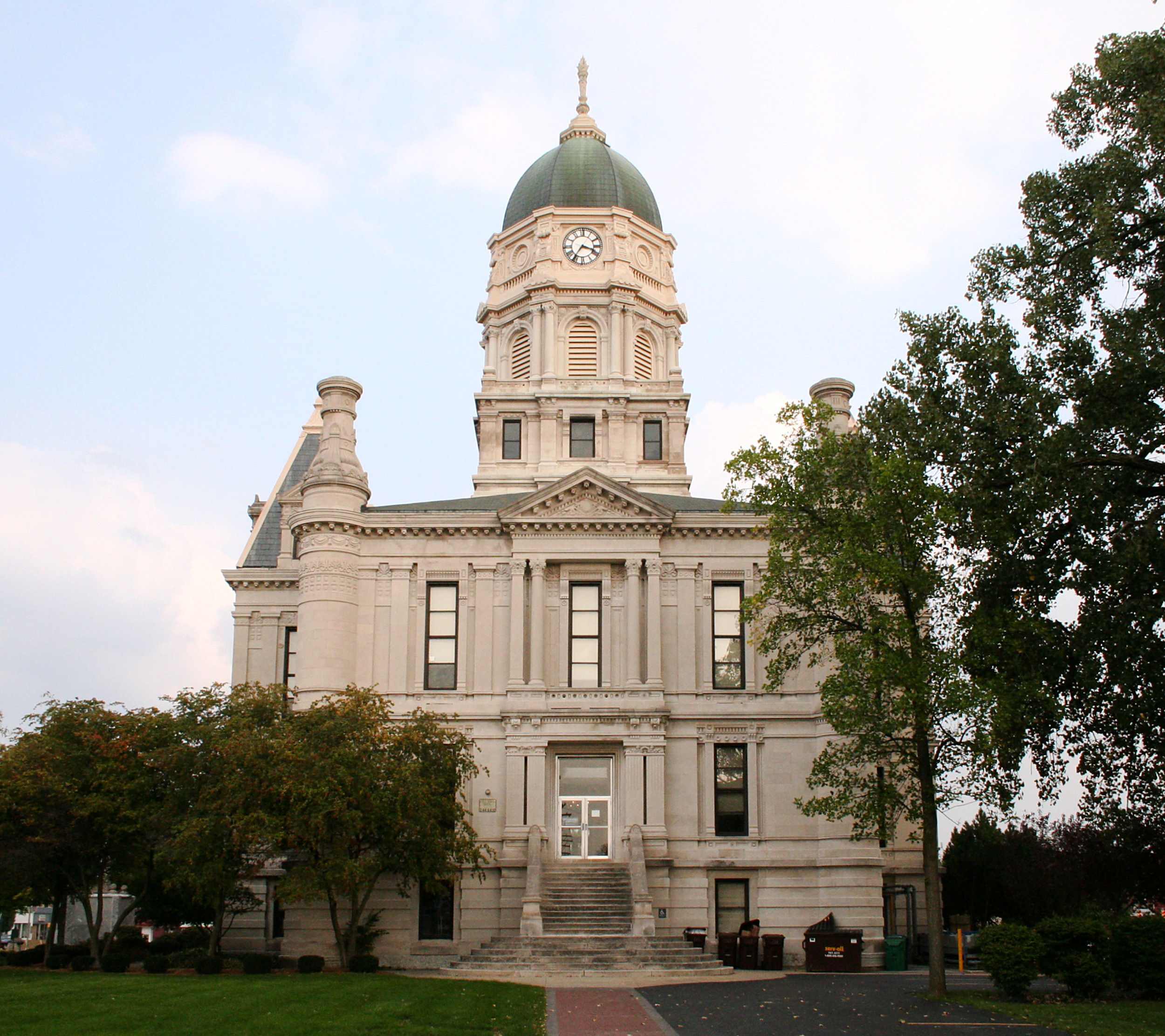
Whitley County Courthouse

The first European ancestry settlers arrived in 1837 as a result of the end of the Black Hawk War and the Erie Canal. They were from New England - "Yankee" Settlers, descendants of the English Puritans who settled New England in the colonial era. They were primarily members of the Congregational Church though due to the Second Great Awakening many of them had converted to Methodism and some had become Baptists before coming to what is now Columbia City.

Columbia City was founded in 1839, originally just being called "Columbia". The name was later changed in 1854 since there was already a city named Columbia in the state. Many public debates were held to discuss different names for the city, but it was later only reduced to two: "Beaver" and "Columbia City." Eventually, the name Columbia City was selected.

The completion of the Pittsburgh, Fort Wayne, & Chicago Railway in 1856 brought rapid growth to the small town, and from 1865 to 1875 the population would have tripled. Columbia City was incorporated in the state of Indiana in 1888.

The city's historic jailhouse was built in 1875 with an old second empire-style. It is said to be haunted. A new county jail was inaugurated in 2024.

The Whitley County Courthouse was designed (1888–1891) by Brentwood S. Tolan, of Fort Wayne, Indiana. The building was added to the National Register of Historic Places in 1979. The Thomas R. Marshall House was added to the register in 1983 and the Columbia City Historic District was added in 1987.

== Geography ==
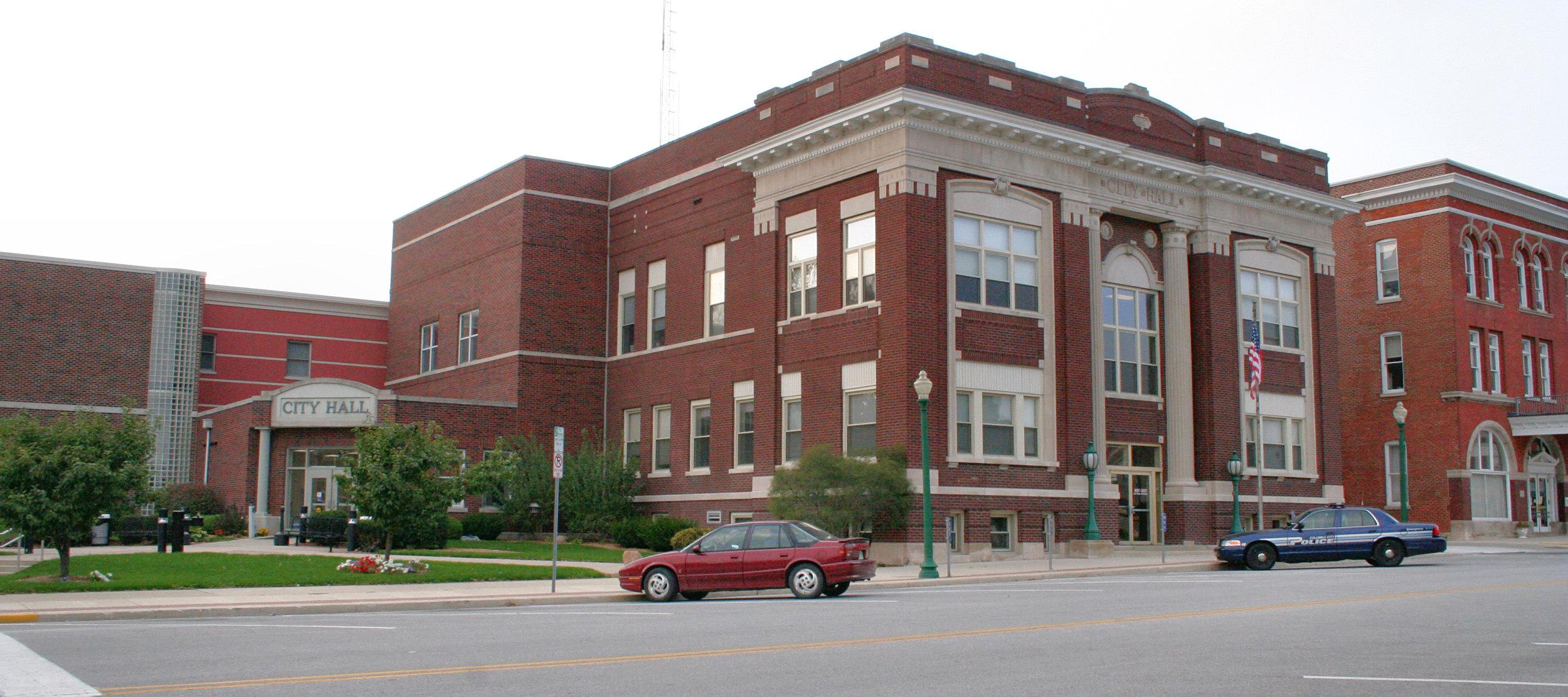
City Hall building

According to the 2010 census, Columbia City has a total area of 5.601 square miles (14.51 km^{2}), of which 5.58 square miles (14.45 km^{2}) (or 99.63%) is land and 0.021 square miles (0.05 km^{2}) (or 0.37%) is water.

=== Climate ===
According to the Köppen Climate Classification system, Columbia City has a hot-summer humid continental climate, abbreviated "Dfa" on climate maps. The hottest temperature recorded in Columbia City was 103 °F (39.4 °C) on June 26, 1988, while the coldest temperature recorded was −24 °F (−31.1 °C) on January 19–21, 1994.

Climate data for Columbia City, Indiana, 1991–2020 normals, extremes 1963–present
Month	Jan	Feb	Mar	Apr	May	Jun	Jul	Aug	Sep	Oct	Nov	Dec	Year
Record high °F (°C)	66 (19)	72 (22)	84 (29)	88 (31)	94 (34)	103 (39)	101 (38)	98 (37)	96 (36)	89 (32)	77 (25)	70 (21)	103 (39)
Mean maximum °F (°C)	53.9 (12.2)	56.7 (13.7)	69.6 (20.9)	78.8 (26.0)	86.0 (30.0)	91.2 (32.9)	91.6 (33.1)	89.8 (32.1)	88.2 (31.2)	81.5 (27.5)	66.9 (19.4)	56.1 (13.4)	93.3 (34.1)
Mean daily maximum °F (°C)	31.7 (−0.2)	35.4 (1.9)	46.4 (8.0)	59.4 (15.2)	70.4 (21.3)	79.3 (26.3)	82.5 (28.1)	80.7 (27.1)	75.2 (24.0)	62.7 (17.1)	48.6 (9.2)	36.7 (2.6)	59.1 (15.0)
Daily mean °F (°C)	24.0 (−4.4)	27.0 (−2.8)	36.9 (2.7)	48.6 (9.2)	59.8 (15.4)	69.1 (20.6)	72.3 (22.4)	70.4 (21.3)	63.8 (17.7)	52.1 (11.2)	39.9 (4.4)	29.5 (−1.4)	49.4 (9.7)
Mean daily minimum °F (°C)	16.2 (−8.8)	18.5 (−7.5)	27.4 (−2.6)	37.8 (3.2)	49.2 (9.6)	58.9 (14.9)	62.1 (16.7)	60.2 (15.7)	52.5 (11.4)	41.6 (5.3)	31.2 (−0.4)	22.3 (−5.4)	39.8 (4.3)
Mean minimum °F (°C)	−6.6 (−21.4)	−1.0 (−18.3)	9.5 (−12.5)	21.9 (−5.6)	33.2 (0.7)	44.8 (7.1)	50.7 (10.4)	48.3 (9.1)	38.4 (3.6)	27.0 (−2.8)	15.5 (−9.2)	2.9 (−16.2)	−10.4 (−23.6)
Record low °F (°C)	−24 (−31)	−17 (−27)	−6 (−21)	7 (−14)	24 (−4)	36 (2)	39 (4)	36 (2)	27 (−3)	17 (−8)	0 (−18)	−22 (−30)	−24 (−31)
Average precipitation inches (mm)	2.54 (65)	1.95 (50)	2.62 (67)	3.81 (97)	4.34 (110)	4.62 (117)	3.86 (98)	4.07 (103)	3.00 (76)	2.85 (72)	2.98 (76)	2.43 (62)	39.07 (993)
Average snowfall inches (cm)	7.0 (18)	6.5 (17)	3.0 (7.6)	0.3 (0.76)	0.0 (0.0)	0.0 (0.0)	0.0 (0.0)	0.0 (0.0)	0.0 (0.0)	0.0 (0.0)	1.2 (3.0)	3.4 (8.6)	21.4 (54.96)
Average precipitation days (≥ 0.01 in)	11.5	9.0	9.8	11.3	12.3	11.3	9.5	9.7	8.6	10.1	10.2	11.0	124.3
Average snowy days (≥ 0.1 in)	5.3	3.8	1.7	0.3	0.0	0.0	0.0	0.0	0.0	0.0	0.6	3.6	15.3
Source 1: NOAA
Source 2: National Weather Service

== Economy ==
About 12 percent of Columbia City's population is employed in the manufacturing sector. This makes it one of the most important sectors in the city. Currently there are 6 businesses employing 50 - 350 people in the city. Those six companies are 80/20, Coupled Products, LLC, Alcoils, inc., Reelcraft Industries, Inc. ChromaSource, Inc. and Kilgore Manufacturing Company, Inc.

The city also has agricultural roots with it contributing heavily to its economy. Columbia City is 25 miles away from Fort Wayne, 20 miles away from Warsaw, and 69 miles away from South Bend, making it a strategic location for business.

== Demographics ==
Historical population
Census	Pop.	Note	%±
1860	887		—
1870	1,663		87.5%
1880	2,244		34.9%
1890	3,027		34.9%
1900	2,975		−1.7%
1910	3,448		15.9%
1920	3,499		1.5%
1930	3,805		8.7%
1940	4,219		10.9%
1950	4,745		12.5%
1960	4,803		1.2%
1970	4,911		2.2%
1980	5,091		3.7%
1990	5,706		12.1%
2000	7,077		24.0%
2010	8,750		23.6%
2020	9,892		13.1%
U.S. Decennial Census 2020

=== 2020 census ===
As of the 2020 census, Columbia City had a population of 9,892. The median age was 36.4 years. 23.2% of residents were under the age of 18 and 17.1% of residents were 65 years of age or older. For every 100 females there were 89.0 males, and for every 100 females age 18 and over there were 86.7 males age 18 and over.

99.5% of residents lived in urban areas, while 0.5% lived in rural areas.

There were 4,250 households in Columbia City, of which 29.4% had children under the age of 18 living in them. Of all households, 39.8% were married-couple households, 19.8% were households with a male householder and no spouse or partner present, and 33.1% were households with a female householder and no spouse or partner present. About 36.3% of all households were made up of individuals and 16.0% had someone living alone who was 65 years of age or older.

There were 4,485 housing units, of which 5.2% were vacant. The homeowner vacancy rate was 1.0% and the rental vacancy rate was 6.1%.

Racial composition as of the 2020 census
Race	Number	Percent
White	9,086	91.9%
Black or African American	86	0.9%
American Indian and Alaska Native	29	0.3%
Asian	98	1.0%
Native Hawaiian and Other Pacific Islander	0	0.0%
Some other race	155	1.6%
Two or more races	438	4.4%
Hispanic or Latino (of any race)	382	3.9%

=== 2010 census ===
As of the census of 2010, there were 8,750 people, 3,658 households, and 2,235 families residing in the city. The population density was 1,568.1 inhabitants per square mile (605.4/km^{2}). There were 3,944 housing units at an average density of 706.8 per square mile (272.9/km^{2}). The racial makeup of the city was 96.7% White, 0.5% African American, 0.3% Native American, 0.5% Asian, 0.6% from other races, and 1.4% from two or more races. Hispanic or Latino of any race were 2.2% of the population.

There were 3,658 households, of which 30.9% had children under the age of 18 living with them, 42.4% were married couples living together, 13.9% had a female householder with no husband present, 4.8% had a male householder with no wife present, and 38.9% were non-families. 33.5% of all households were made up of individuals, and 14.2% had someone living alone who was 65 years of age or older. The average household size was 2.32 and the average family size was 2.93.

The median age in the city was 36.1 years. 24.9% of residents were under the age of 18; 9.1% were between the ages of 18 and 24; 26.7% were from 25 to 44; 23.9% were from 45 to 64; and 15.3% were 65 years of age or older. The gender makeup of the city was 47.6% male and 52.4% female.

=== 2000 census ===
As of the census of 2000, there were 7,077 people, 3,018 households, and 1,874 residing in the city. The population density was 1,359.5 inhabitants per square mile (524.9/km^{2}). There were 3,191 housing units at an average density of 613.0 per square mile (236.7/km^{2}). The racial makeup of the city was 98.11% White, 0.32% African American, 0.44% Native American, 0.08% Asian, 0.03% Pacific Islander, 0.34% from other races, and 0.68% from two or more races. Hispanic or Latino of any race were 1.20% of the population.

There were 3,018 households, out of which 30.6% had children under the age of 18 living with them, 45.8% were married couples living together, 12.4% had a female householder with no husband present, and 37.9% were non-families. 33.6% of all households were made up of individuals, and 15.1% had someone living alone who was 65 years of age or older. The average household size was 2.27 and the average family size was 2.89.

In the city, the population was spread out, with 24.4% under the age of 18, 9.9% from 18 to 24, 29.1% from 25 to 44, 18.8% from 45 to 64, and 17.7% who were 65 years of age or older. The median age was 36 years. For every 100 females, there were 89.2 males. For every 100 females age 18 and over, there were 85.8 males.

The median income for a household in the city was $36,112, and the median income for a family was $47,357. Males had a median income of $34,803 versus $21,740 for females. The per capita income for the city was $19,296. About 4.5% of families and 6.4% of the population were below the poverty line, including 5.8% of those under age 18 and 9.8% of those age 65 or over.

== Government ==
The city government consists of a mayor and a five-member city council. The mayor is elected in a citywide vote, along with the city councilperson-at-large. The remaining four council members are elected from individual city districts: northeast, southeast, southwest and northwest. There is also a city clerk-treasurer who is elected in a citywide vote.

The Columbia City post office has been in operation since 1854.

== Healthcare ==
- Columbia City is home to a Parkview Health branch.

== Education ==
- Columbia City High School
- Eagle Tech Academy
- Indian Springs Middle School
- Mary Raber Elementary School
- Little Turtle Elementary School
- Northern Heights Elementary School
- Coesse Elementary School
- Faith Christian Academy

The town has a lending library, the Peabody Public Library.

== Notable people ==
- Jim Banks, U.S. senator for Indiana; former U.S. representative
- Jill Long Thompson, member of U.S. Congress (1989–1995)
