= East Noble School Corporation =

School district in Indiana

East Noble School Corporation is the largest of four official school corporations in Noble County, Indiana, encompassing the easternmost section of the county. This includes the areas of Orange, Wayne, Allen and Swan Townships, and serves to educate the children located in the cities and towns of Rome City, Brimfield, Kendallville, Avilla and LaOtto.

== History ==
=== Establishment and early years (1965-1967) ===
East Noble School Corporation has its origins from the school consolidations that occurred in Indiana in the 1950s and 1960s that were the result of an act on the part of the Indiana General Assembly, At that time, the high schools in Rome City, Avilla and Kendallville were converted into middle schools. In 1966, construction of East Noble High School was completed. The school's first classes walked through the doors in the fall of 1966, and its first graduating class walked in 1967.

=== Reorganization and later developments (2009-present) ===
Elementary-aged students residing in LaOtto attended LaOtto Elementary School for grades K-5 from the school corporation's founding in 1965 until 2009, when East Noble School Corporation's School Board of trustees voted to close LaOtto Elementary. This also resulted in extending Rome City, Avilla and Kendallville Elementary/Middle Schools from K-5 to K-6 students, consolidated the middle schools of the aforementioned cities into the original Kendallville Middle School building, creating East Noble Middle School. The new middle school housed education for students grades 7 and 8.

In 2023, students and parents were outraged when East Noble Middle School principal Andrew Deming resigned. Students reportedly staged a protest inside of the school. Additionally, an athletic director was accused of stealing money in 2023, and later sued the school corporation in 2025, saying district officials denied him due process. The school corporation fired a staff member later that same year for what was described as inappropriate conduct. Also in 2025, a man who served as secretary on the school corporation's board of directors resigned after he was arrested in Swinney Park in Fort Wayne, Indiana. Children were reportedly present at the park. A teacher resigned one year earlier after allegedly hitting a student.

== Schools ==
With exception of the schools in Rome City and Avilla, all of East Noble School Corporation's schools are located in Kendallville and its surrounding areas.

- East Noble High School
- East Noble Middle School
- Wayne Center Elementary School
- North Side Elemenatary School
- South Side Elementary School
- Rome City Elementary School
- Avilla Elementary School
