= East Noble High School =

Location
- 901 Garden Street; Kendallville, Noble County, Indiana 46755; United States; 41°26′06″N 85°15′22″W

Information
- Type: Public high school
- Established: 1966
- School district: East Noble School Corporation
- Principal: Cliff Hannon
- Teaching staff: 67.58 (FTE)
- Grades: 9-12
- Enrollment: 999 (2023–2024)
- Student to teacher ratio: 14.78
- Color
- Athletics conference: Northeast Eight Conference
- Team name: Knights
- Rivals: Dekalb, Angola, Leo
- Information: (260) 347-2032
- Website: Official Website

East Noble High School is a public high school located in Kendallville, Indiana and is the only high school that is part of the East Noble School Corporation. It serves to educate more than 1,000 students from the cities and towns of Rome City, Brimfield, Kendallville, Avilla and LaOtto.

== History ==
East Noble High School originated from the school consolidations that occurred in Indiana in the 1950s and 1960s, due to an act of the Indiana General Assembly. During this time, the high schools in Rome City, Avilla, and Kendallville were repurposed into junior high/middle schools. In 1966, construction of East Noble High School was completed and the first class entered East Noble that fall. East Noble's first graduating class was in 1967.

The school's theatre director Craig Munk was nominated for a Tony Award in 2016.

The school switched to using educational technology during the COVID-19 pandemic in 2020.

== Notable alumni ==
- David M. McIntosh - member of the U.S. House of Representatives for Indiana's 2nd congressional district
- Amy Yoder Begley (1996) - Middle- and long-distance runner. US Olympian in the 10,000 meter event at the 2008 Summer Olympics
- Ben Van Ryn - MLB pitcher
- Harold Urey - attended Kendallville High School prior to consolidation; recipient of 1934 Nobel Prize in Chemistry
- Brad Miller - Two-time NBA all-star who played for six of the league's teams

== See also ==
- List of high schools in Indiana
