= Bakertown =

Bakertown or Bakerstown may refer to:

- Bakertown, Indiana
- Bakertown, Michigan
- Bakerstown, Pennsylvania
