= Eel River Township, Allen County, Indiana =

Eel River Township
- Township
- Location in Allen County, Indiana
- Coordinates: 41°13′39″N 85°15′23″W
- Country: United States
- State: Indiana
- County: Allen

Government
  - Type: Indiana township

Area
  - Total: 36.55 sq mi (94.67 km^{2})
  - Land: 36.50 sq mi (94.53 km^{2})
  - Water: 0.054 sq mi (0.14 km^{2}) 0.15%
- Elevation: 866 ft (264 m)

Population (2020)
  - Total: 4,199
  - Density: 99/sq mi (38.2/km^{2})
- ZIP codes: 46723, 46748, 46818
- GNIS feature ID: 0453273

Eel River Township is one of twenty townships in Allen County, Indiana, United States. As of the 2010 census, its population was 3,612.

== Geography ==
According to the United States Census Bureau, Eel River Township covers an area of 36.55 square miles (94.67 km^{2}); of this, 36.50 square miles (94.53 km^{2}) is land and 0.054 square miles (0.14 km^{2}), or 0.15 percent, is water.

=== Cities, towns, villages ===
- Huntertown (west edge)

=== Unincorporated towns ===
- Ari at 41.2636595°N 85.2494193°W

(This list is based on USGS data and may include former settlements.)

=== Adjacent townships ===
- Swan Township, Noble County (north)
- Butler Township, DeKalb County (northeast)
- Perry Township (east)
- Washington Township (southeast)
- Lake Township (south)
- Smith Township, Whitley County (west)
- Green Township, Noble County (northwest)

=== Cemeteries ===
The township contains these four cemeteries: Eel River, Fairview, Riverview and Watterson.

=== Major highways ===
- US 33
- SR 205

=== Lakes ===
- Fulk Lake
- White Lake

== School districts ==
- Northwest Allen County Schools

== Political districts ==
- Indiana's 3rd congressional district
- State House District 83
- State Senate District 17
