= Maria Straub =

American temperance worker (1838–1898)

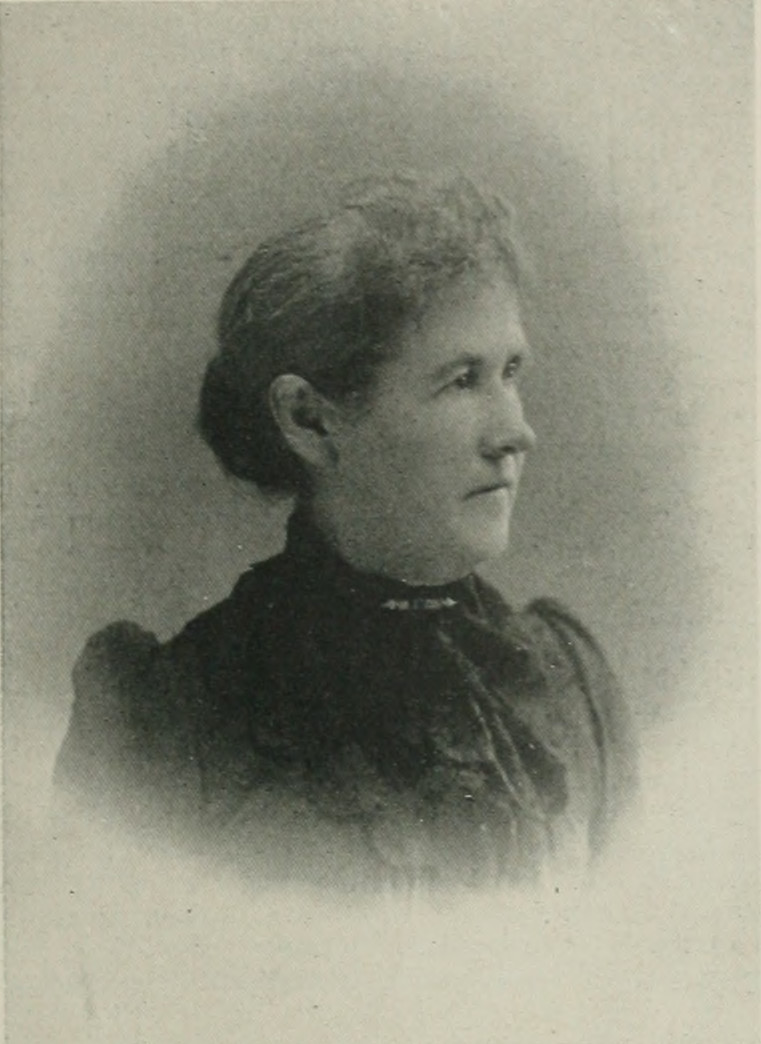
- Photo in A Woman of the Century
- Born: October 27, 1838; DeKalb County, Indiana, U.S.
- Died: June 30, 1897 (aged 58); Chicago, Illinois, U.S.
- Resting place: LaOtto, Indiana, U.S.
- Occupation: Writer
- Writing career
- Genres: Prose, poetry, hymns

Maria Straub (October 27, 1838 – June 30, 1897) was an American writer of prose, poetry, and hymns. She was best known for writing nearly 200 hymns, all of which were set to music by American composers. She was also a contributor to a number of journals. She was an ardent worker in the Woman's Christian Temperance Union (WCTU) and, although she suffered from poor health, Straub wielded an important influence through her songs and writings.

== Early life and education ==
Maria Straub was born in DeKalb County, Indiana, October 27, 1838. She was the sixth of eight children. Her father, Joseph, was a farmer. Her parents, who were of German origin, were Pennsylvanians. Her siblings were Henry, Susan, Simon Peter, Jacob, Margaret Ann, Barbara Elizabeth, and Solomon.

The family were greatly diversified in religious belief, representing the extremes as well as the more moderate views. The religious proclivity of Straub was strongly indicated by the numerous hymns of hers sung in churches and Sunday schools throughout the country. Of a studious, quiet nature, a victim to poor health, she early manifested fondness for reading and study. Unable, physically, to take a regular school course, and being ambitious to lose nothing, she planned her own curriculum and made up through home study, by the assistance of her friends, what she failed to get otherwise. During those years she caught the spirit of verse-making. Her mother granted her all the opportunities possible for Straub to make the most of herself.

== Career ==
After her father's death, Straub was engaged for some time in teaching country schools in the vicinity of her home. She gradually became associated with her brother, Solomon, the musician, in music-book making. In 1873, she went to Chicago, Illinois, where she became a member of her brother's family. There she took a place on the editorial staff of her brother's musical monthly, the Song Friend, besides contributing occasionally in prose and poetry to other periodicals. She was a regular correspondent of the Religious Telescope, of Dayton, Ohio.

She was interested in current events and especially in reforms and philanthropies. Her love for the cause of temperance prompted the words of her and her brother's first published song, "Gird On, Gird On Your Sword of Trust," in 1868. Some of her happiest effusions were inspired by her love of country, as shown in the titles of two of her highly popular pieces: "Blessed is the Nation Whose God is the Lord", and "Wave, Columbia, Wave Thy Banner". These with many others of her secular poems found musical expression in the various songs books in use in homes and schools.

== Death ==
After an illness of three weeks, Straub died in Chicago at the home of her brother, Solomon, on June 30, 1897. Interment was in LaOtto, Indiana.

== Selected works ==
=== Hymns ===
- "God Sees the Little Sparrow Fall"
- "Sabbath School Greeting"

=== Songs ===
- "For Mother’s Sake I Will Refrain"
- "Fight the Battle at the Polls"
- "Blessed is the Nation Whose God is the Lord"
- "Wave, Columbia, Wave Thy Banner"
