= Martha Barnhart =

American civic leader

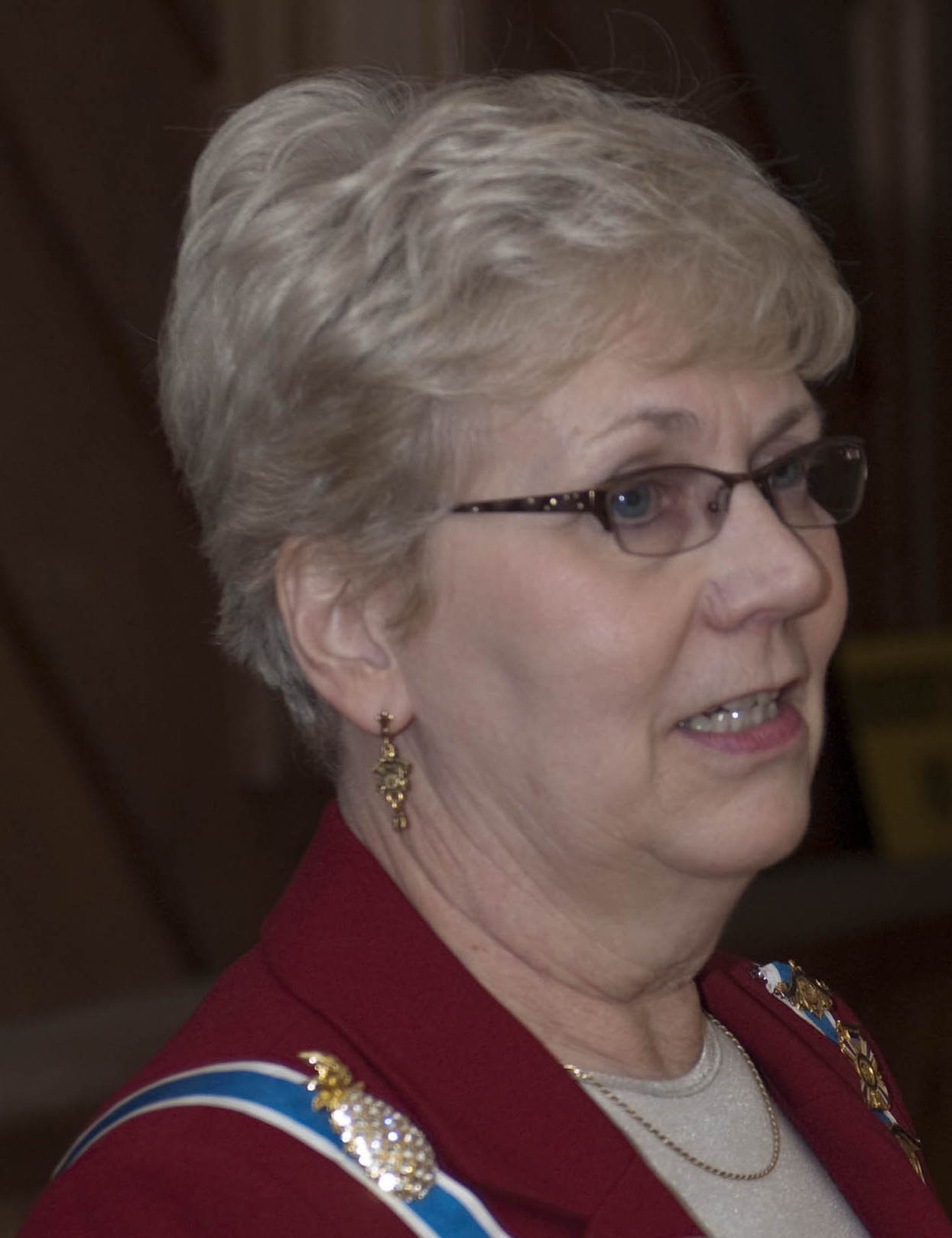
- Barnhart in 2010

President, Ladies Auxiliary of the National Society Sons of the American Revolution
- In office 2018–2020

Treasurer General, National Society Daughters of the American Revolution
- In office 2013–2016
- President: Lynn Forney Young

Indiana State Regent, National Society Daughters of the American Revolution
- In office 2009–2011
- President: Merry Ann Thompson Wright

Personal details
- Born: Martha Gee
- Spouse: Roger Barnhart (m. 1987; died 2025)
- Children: 3

Martha Gee Barnhart is an American civic leader. She served as the Indiana state regent of the Daughters of the American Revolution from 2009 to 2011 and as treasurer general of the national society from 2013 to 2016. She also served as the president of the Ladies Auxiliary of the National Society Sons of the American Revolution.

== Civic work ==
Barnhart joined the Daughters of the American Revolution in 1992. She served as the State Regent of Indiana for the Daughters of the American Revolution. She was installed as state regent in a ceremony in Washington, D.C. in July 2009. As state regent, she led historical preservation efforts at Stewart-Griesinger Cemetery in Wilmot, Indiana and placed a historical marker at the entrance of the cemetery to honor American Revolutionary War soldier Joseph Galloway Sr.

After retiring as state regent, she was elected honorary state regent of Indiana. She was appointed as the Indiana State Chair for unites overseas.

Barnhart was Treasurer General of the Daughters of the American Revolution during the administration of President General Lynn Forney Young. As member of the national society's executive council, she travelled around the country to state society events. In 2017, she attended the installation of officers of the Galloway-Prentice Chapter of the National Society Daughters of the American Revolution in Albion, Indiana. In 2021, she attended the chapter's fifteenth anniversary celebration. She is an associate member of the chapter.

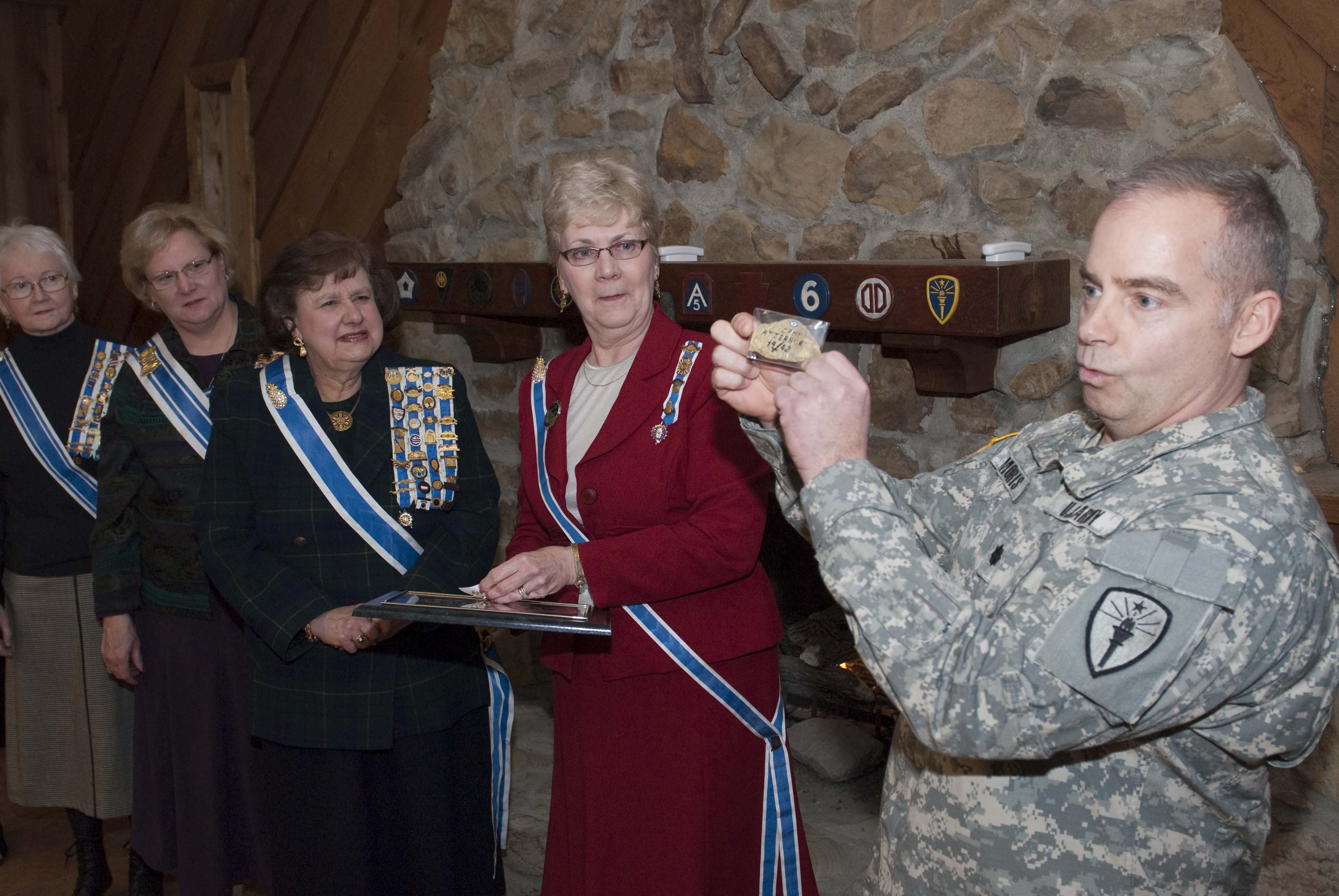
Barnhart (center) with Lt. Col. Ronald Morris (right) at Camp Atterbury in 2010

She served as president of the National Society Sons of the American Revolution Ladies Auxiliary.

In 2024, Barnhart attended the dedication ceremony, hosted by the Mary Penrose Wayne Chapter of the Daughters of the American Revolution, for Sterling Chapel at the Veterans National Memorial Shrine and Museum in Allen County, Indiana. She is a member of the Mar Penrose Wayne Chapter.

Barnhart is a member of the Society of Indiana Pioneers.

== Personal life ==
Barnhart lives in Churubusco, Indiana. On July 19, 1987, she married Roger Barnhart, who died August 31, 2025. Roger had served as National Vice President General of the Sons of the American Revolution.
