= Wayne Center =

Wayne Center may refer to:

- Wayne Center, Indiana
- Wayne Center, New York
