= Washington Center =

The Washington Center, a.k.a. The Washington Center for Internships and Academic Seminars, is an academic center in Washington, D.C.

Washington Center may also refer to:

- Washington Air Route Traffic Control Center, an area control center
- Washington Center, Indiana, an unincorporated community
- Washington Center, Noble County, Indiana, an unincorporated community
- Washington Center, Missouri, an unincorporated community
