= Orange Township, Indiana =

Orange Township is the name of three townships in Indiana:

- Orange Township, Fayette County, Indiana
- Orange Township, Noble County, Indiana
- Orange Township, Rush County, Indiana
