= Churubusco Jr.–Sr. High School =

Churubusco Junior–Senior High School

Location
- 1 Eagle Dr; Churubusco, Indiana 46723; United States
- 41°13′48″N 85°19′23″W

Information
- Type: Public high school
- School district: Smith–Green Community Schools
- Principal: Terrence Roe
- Teaching staff: 35.00 (on an FTE basis)
- Grades: 6-12
- Primary years taught: 6th Grade-12th Grade
- Enrollment: 636 (2023–2024)
- Student to teacher ratio: 18.17
- Language: English, Spanish
- Hours in school day: 8
- Campus: Rural
- Colors: Old gold and black
- Athletics conference: Northeast Corner Conference of Indiana
- Mascot: Eagles
- Rivals: Central Noble, Eastside
- Website: jshs.sgcs.k12.in.us

Churubusco Junior–Senior High School is a public secondary school located in Churubusco, Indiana. It serves grades 6–12 for Smith–Green Community Schools.

== Athletics ==
The Churubusco Eagles compete in the Northeast Corner Conference of Indiana. School colors are old gold and black. For the 2019–2020 school year, the following Indiana High School Athletic Association (IHSAA) sanctioned sports were offered:

- Baseball (boys)
- Basketball (girls and boys)
- Cross country (girls and boys)
- Football (boys)
- Golf (girls and boys)
- Softball (girls)
- Tennis (girls and boys)
- Track and field (girls and boys)
- Volleyball (girls)
- Wrestling (boys)

== Notable alumni ==
- Brent Gaff, former professional baseball player
- Harry Gandy, U.S. Representative from South Dakota
- Craig W. Hartman, architect

== See also ==
- List of high schools in Indiana
