= Jefferson Township, Indiana =

Jefferson Township is the name of twenty-eight townships in the U.S. state of Indiana:

- Jefferson Township, Adams County, Indiana
- Jefferson Township, Allen County, Indiana
- Jefferson Township, Boone County, Indiana
- Jefferson Township, Carroll County, Indiana
- Jefferson Township, Cass County, Indiana
- Jefferson Township, Dubois County, Indiana
- Jefferson Township, Elkhart County, Indiana
- Jefferson Township, Grant County, Indiana
- Jefferson Township, Greene County, Indiana
- Jefferson Township, Henry County, Indiana
- Jefferson Township, Huntington County, Indiana
- Jefferson Township, Jay County, Indiana
- Jefferson Township, Kosciusko County, Indiana
- Jefferson Township, Miami County, Indiana
- Jefferson Township, Morgan County, Indiana
- Jefferson Township, Newton County, Indiana
- Jefferson Township, Noble County, Indiana
- Jefferson Township, Owen County, Indiana
- Jefferson Township, Pike County, Indiana
- Jefferson Township, Pulaski County, Indiana
- Jefferson Township, Putnam County, Indiana
- Jefferson Township, Sullivan County, Indiana
- Jefferson Township, Switzerland County, Indiana
- Jefferson Township, Tipton County, Indiana
- Jefferson Township, Washington County, Indiana
- Jefferson Township, Wayne County, Indiana
- Jefferson Township, Wells County, Indiana
- Jefferson Township, Whitley County, Indiana
