= Faith Assembly Church of Wilmot, Indiana =

Sect in Indiana, USA

Coordinates: 41°18′11.6″N 85°38′03.7″W

Faith Assembly Church was a multi-church sect headquartered in Wilmot, Indiana, founded in 1973 by Rev. Hobart Freeman. The group had associated groups across Indiana, Ohio, Illinois, Tennessee, and Kentucky. The church originated in a barn on a farm near North Webster, Indiana, called "The Glory Barn". During the 1980s they had 2,000 members. The church taught strict adherence to faith healing, and taught that medicine was evil. By 1983, at least 91 of its members, mostly children, had died as a result of refusing medical treatment. Multiple investigations were launched and ultimately Freeman was indicted on charges relating to the death of a 15-year-old in the congregation in October, 1984. Freeman said he believed he wouldn't die because of his faith in his teachings. Freeman died in December 1984 at age 64, after refusing medical treatment for a personal illness.

Faith Assembly had the highest number of child fatalities due to medical neglect, out of all US churches.
