= Green Township, Noble County, Indiana =

Green Township
- Township
- Location in Noble County
- Coordinates: 41°18′54″N 85°22′31″W
- Country: United States
- State: Indiana
- County: Noble

Government
  - Type: Indiana township

Area
  - Total: 36.03 sq mi (93.3 km^{2})
  - Land: 35.67 sq mi (92.4 km^{2})
  - Water: 0.37 sq mi (0.96 km^{2}) 1.03%
- Elevation: 980 ft (300 m)

Population (2020)
  - Total: 2,016
  - Density: 59.5/sq mi (23.0/km^{2})
- Time zone: UTC-5 (Eastern (EST))
  - Summer (DST): UTC-4 (EDT)
- ZIP codes: 46701, 46710, 46723, 46763
- Area code: 260
- GNIS feature ID: 453345

Green Township is one of thirteen townships in Noble County, Indiana, United States. As of the 2020 census, its population was 2,016 (down from 2,123 at 2010) and it contained 739 housing units.

== History ==
The Stanley School-District No. 2 was listed on the National Register of Historic Places in 2014.

== Geography ==
According to the 2010 census, the township has a total area of 36.03 square miles (93.3 km^{2}), of which 35.67 square miles (92.4 km^{2}) (or 99.00%) is land and 0.37 square miles (0.96 km^{2}) (or 1.03%) is water.

=== Unincorporated towns ===
- Green Center at 41.308381°N 85.366089°W

(This list is based on USGS data and may include former settlements.)

=== Cemeteries ===
The township contains Grays Cemetery.

=== Major highways ===
- U.S. Route 33

=== Airports and landing strips ===
- Green Center Airport

=== Lakes ===
- Bowen Lake
- Dock Lake
- Hickman Lake
- Krieger Lake
- Lindsey Lake
- Long Lake
- Mc Henry Lake
- Millers Lake
- Norman Lake
- River Lake
- Sand Lake
- Sucker Lake
- Summit Lake

== School districts ==
- Smith–Green Community Schools

== Political districts ==
- Indiana's 3rd congressional district
- State House District 83
- State Senate District 13
