= York Township, Noble County, Indiana =

York Township
- Township
- Coordinates: 41°24′05″N 85°28′52″W
- Country: United States
- State: Indiana
- County: Noble

Government
  - Type: Indiana township

Area
  - Total: 33.49 sq mi (86.7 km^{2})
  - Land: 33.08 sq mi (85.7 km^{2})
  - Water: 0.42 sq mi (1.1 km^{2})
- Elevation: 879 ft (268 m)

Population (2020)
  - Total: 1,532
  - Density: 48.5/sq mi (18.7/km^{2})
- Time zone: UTC-5 (Eastern (EST))
  - Summer (DST): UTC-4 (EDT)
- Area code: 260
- FIPS code: 18-85994
- GNIS feature ID: 454069

York Township is one of thirteen townships in Noble County, Indiana. As of the 2020 census, its population was 1,532 (down from 1,605 at 2010) and it contained 642 housing units.

== Geography ==
According to the 2010 census, the township has a total area of 33.49 square miles (86.7 km^{2}), of which 33.08 square miles (85.7 km^{2}) (or 98.78%) is land and 0.42 square miles (1.1 km^{2}) (or 1.25%) is water.

=== Unincorporated towns ===
- Port Mitchell at 41.3619926°N 85.4388688°W

(This list is based on USGS data and may include former settlements.)
