= Churubusco, Indiana =

Town in Whitley County, Indiana

- Town
- Town of Churubusco
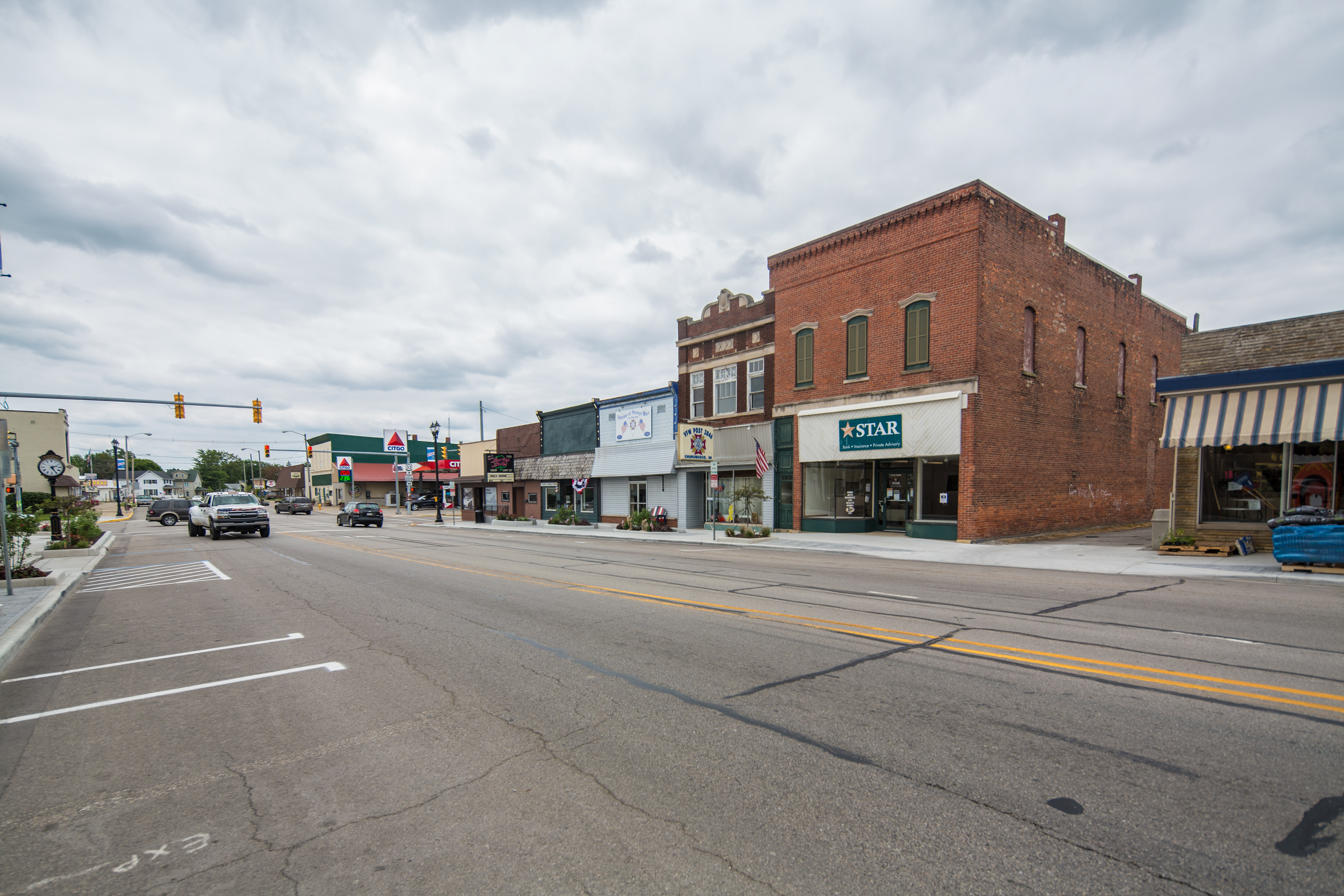
- Nicknames: 'Busco, Turtle Town, U.S.A.
- Location of Churubusco in Whitley County, Indiana.

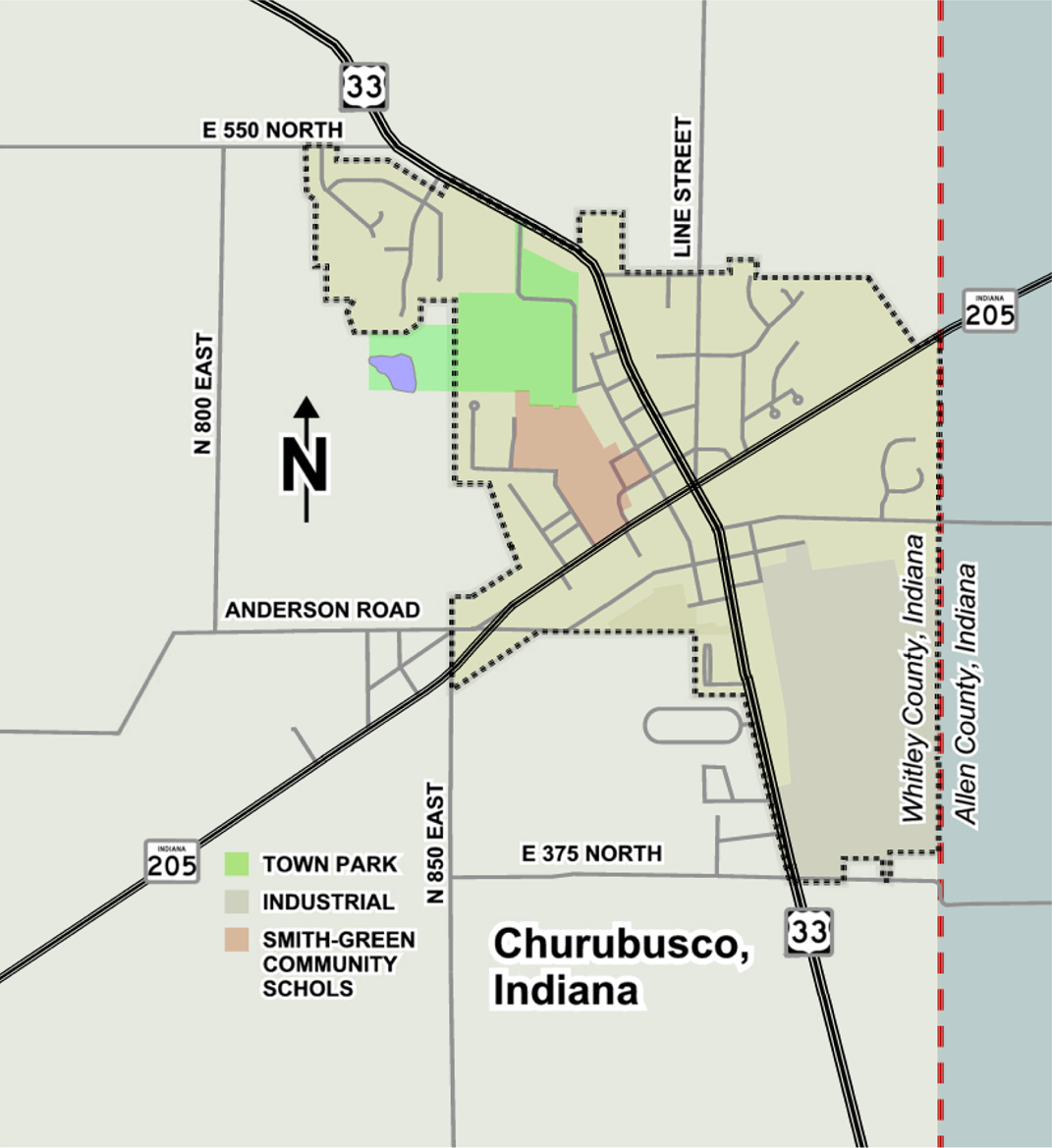
- City limits as of 2010 annexation.
- Coordinates: 41°13′51″N 85°19′11″W
- Country: United States
- State: Indiana
- County: Whitley
- Township: Smith

Government
  - Type: council-clerk
  - President: Mark Pepple

Area
  - Total: 1.05 sq mi (2.71 km^{2})
  - Land: 1.05 sq mi (2.71 km^{2})
  - Water: 0 sq mi (0.00 km^{2})
- Elevation: 896 ft (273 m)

Population (2020)
  - Total: 1,870
  - Density: 1,785.0/sq mi (689.18/km^{2})
- Demonym: Busconian
- Time zone: UTC−5 (Eastern (EST))
  - Summer (DST): UTC−4 (EDT)
- ZIP code: 46723
- Area code: 260
- FIPS code: 18-12610
- GNIS feature ID: 2396645
- Website: www.townofchurubusco.com

Churubusco (/ˌtʃɛrəˈbʌskoʊ/ or /ˌtʃɛriˈbʌskoʊ/); often shortened to Busco (/ˈbʌskoʊ/), is a town located near the headwaters of the Eel River in the extreme northeast corner of Whitley County, Indiana, United States, in Smith Township, about 16 miles (26 km) northwest of Fort Wayne. As of the 2020 census, Churubusco had a population of 1,870.

== History ==
An 1889 plat map of Churubusco showing the first two towns, "Union" and "Franklin."

Originally, the area of Churubusco was made up of two towns founded in the 19th century by European Americans: Union and Franklin (in honor of Founding Father Benjamin Franklin) that bordered each other across a railroad track. In the 1840s, the populations of both Franklin and Union grew large enough to qualify each for a post office. Before that time, residents of both towns had to trek 11 miles by foot or horse and buggy to nearby Columbia City to get their mail. Since the towns were in the same location, the Postmaster General ordered the towns to apply for a joint post office. The Postmaster General denied the use of either "Union" and "Franklin" as the new post office name, since both were already used by other Indiana towns.

After a community meeting, the residents selected Churubusco for the new post office, named after the site of the 1847 Battle of Churubusco, in Mexico during the Mexican–American War. At the time, after the suggestion of local school teacher Eliza Rich, the townsfolk thought it was as patriotic a name as Union and Franklin, since the United States won a large victory there. More importantly, they were certain no other Indiana town would already have chosen such a unique name. The Churubusco post office has been in operation since 1848.

The name Churubusco is a Spanish corruption of an indigenous Nahuatl toponym (place name) referring to a temple area celebrating the Aztec god Huitzilopochtli. It is bordered by the Rio Churubusco in Mexico City. The Spanish-Nahuatl word literally translates as 'place (or temple) of Huitzilopochtli (the left side or south of the hummingbird)'.

== Geography ==
According to the 2010 census, Churubusco has a total area of 0.9 square miles (2.33 km^{2}), all land.

== Demographics ==
Historical population
Census	Pop.	Note	%±
1880	720		—
1890	869		20.7%
1900	884		1.7%
1910	870		−1.6%
1920	916		5.3%
1930	1,095		19.5%
1940	1,122		2.5%
1950	1,232		9.8%
1960	1,284		4.2%
1970	1,528		19.0%
1980	1,638		7.2%
1990	1,781		8.7%
2000	1,666		−6.5%
2010	1,796		7.8%
2020	1,870		4.1%
U.S. Decennial Census

=== 2020 census ===
As of the 2020 census, Churubusco had a population of 1,870. The median age was 38.7 years. 23.3% of residents were under the age of 18 and 18.1% of residents were 65 years of age or older. For every 100 females there were 94.4 males, and for every 100 females age 18 and over there were 88.8 males age 18 and over.

0.0% of residents lived in urban areas, while 100.0% lived in rural areas.

There were 828 households in Churubusco, of which 28.7% had children under the age of 18 living in them. Of all households, 38.8% were married-couple households, 19.4% were households with a male householder and no spouse or partner present, and 34.4% were households with a female householder and no spouse or partner present. About 37.5% of all households were made up of individuals and 18.2% had someone living alone who was 65 years of age or older.

There were 864 housing units, of which 4.2% were vacant. The homeowner vacancy rate was 0.0% and the rental vacancy rate was 4.3%.

Racial composition as of the 2020 census
Race	Number	Percent
White	1,722	92.1%
Black or African American	6	0.3%
American Indian and Alaska Native	6	0.3%
Asian	6	0.3%
Native Hawaiian and Other Pacific Islander	0	0.0%
Some other race	22	1.2%
Two or more races	108	5.8%
Hispanic or Latino (of any race)	66	3.5%

=== 2010 census ===
As of the census of 2010, there were 1,796 people, 706 households, and 483 families residing in the town. The population density was 1,995.6 inhabitants per square mile (770.5/km^{2}). There were 749 housing units at an average density of 832.2 per square mile (321.3/km^{2}). The racial makeup of the town was 97.8% White, 0.1% African American, 0.3% Native American, 0.2% Asian, 0.4% from other races, and 1.2% from two or more races. Hispanic or Latino of any race were 2.1% of the population.

There were 706 households, of which 37.8% had children under the age of 18 living with them, 49.4% were married couples living together, 14.4% had a female householder with no husband present, 4.5% had a male householder with no wife present, and 31.6% were non-families. 26.5% of all households were made up of individuals, and 10.5% had someone living alone who was 65 years of age or older. The average household size was 2.54 and the average family size was 3.06.

The median age in the town was 33.9 years. 27.1% of residents were under the age of 18; 9.4% were between the ages of 18 and 24; 27.7% were from 25 to 44; 24.1% were from 45 to 64; and 11.7% were 65 years of age or older. The gender makeup of the town was 48.3% male and 51.7% female.

=== 2000 census ===
As of the census of 2000, there were 1,666 people, 650 households, and 438 families residing in the town. The population density was 1,876.8 inhabitants per square mile (724.6/km^{2}). There were 692 housing units at an average density of 779.5 per square mile (301.0/km^{2}). The racial makeup of the town was 97.60% White, 0.06% African American, 0.60% Native American, 0.24% Asian, 0.06% Pacific Islander, 0.12% from other races, and 1.32% from two or more races. Hispanic or Latino of any race were 1.38% of the population.

There were 650 households, out of which 36.0% had children under the age of 18 living with them, 50.9% were married couples living together, 13.1% had a female householder with no husband present, and 32.5% were non-families. 28.6% of all households were made up of individuals, and 13.8% had someone living alone who was 65 years of age or older. The average household size was 2.54 and the average family size was 3.15.

In the town, the population was spread out, with 29.0% under the age of 18, 9.7% from 18 to 24, 30.4% from 25 to 44, 18.6% from 45 to 64, and 12.3% who were 65 years of age or older. The median age was 33 years. For every 100 females, there were 88.9 males. For every 100 females age 18 and over, there were 83.1 males.

The median income for a household in the town was $39,583, and the median income for a family was $49,279. Males had a median income of $34,844 versus $22,161 for females. The per capita income for the town was $17,814. About 3.2% of families and 4.9% of the population were below the poverty line, including 4.0% of those under age 18 and 7.4% of those age 65 or over.

== Law and government ==
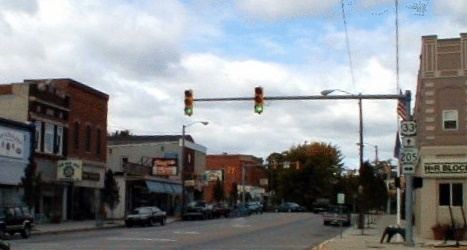
Downtown Churubusco

Churubusco has an elected clerk and town council-style. The Churubusco Town Council is a three-member legislative group that serve four-year terms; each are elected town-wide as at-large council members. The council elects one member from among its body to act as president of the council. That president sets agendas during council meetings. Beginning January 1, 2016, the council began serving staggered terms, with two members serving a one-time, three-year term, and one member and Clerk-Treasurer serving a four-year term.

== Culture ==
Churubusco is home to the oldest continually held festival in Indiana. This event is held yearly at the local park grounds and features many different rides, games, live music, and vendors for the enjoyment of people of all ages. Turtle Days is rooted in the lore of Oscar the Turtle or the Beast of Busco, a giant snapping turtle that reportedly haunted nearby Fulk's Lake in Allen County. Many have tried to catch the monster turtle but no successful attempt has ever been recorded. He has been thought to be the size of a small car. The lake he is rumored to hide in has been drained, but no evidence was found. A popular theory as to why this turtle is so elusive is because the lakes and ponds around Churubusco are connected through an extensive series of channels and streams; some of which are tunnels. Many locals have claimed to see the beast but until evidence can be found, Oscar will still be a mystery of Churubusco, Indiana. Churubusco has multiple murals and statues commemorating this local legend around the down town area as well as inside of Smith green community schools.

Churubusco recently completed phase one of the Downtown Revitalization Project, funded in part with a Main Street Revitalization Grant. The completed phase reconstructed sidewalks, added decorative lighting and landscaping features, and new benches and trash receptacles along the 100 block of North Main Street (US 33), enhancing the beauty of the downtown area. Churubusco's downtown is home to many locally owned shops including an antique store, two barber shops, a hardware store, a secondhand clothing store, and restaurants. One famous restaurant, Magic Wand, is located on South Main Street. It has been owned and operated by the same family since 1964 and is a family friendly diner that also has an outside ice-cream shop. This Indiana landmark is famous for its unusual decor, with the inside of the restaurant decorated with hundreds of clowns.

Churubusco Chamber of Commerce and the Town of Churubusco have been instrumental in creating events that have assisted in the improvement of the quality of life for town residents. Every August, Churubusco hosts the 'Busco Block Party. This free event features local merchants, live music, and other events. The Chamber and the Town have also partnered to organize Halloweenfest. Held the Saturday before Halloween, the event features a merchant trick-or-treat, costume contest, hayrides, and more. Hundreds of children attend the event and it continues to grow every year.

== Education ==
Churubusco High School, Middle School, and Elementary School together form the Smith–Green Community Schools district which includes approximately 1,400 students.

The town has a lending library, the Churubusco Public Library.

== Climate ==
Climate data for Churubusco, Indiana
Month	Jan	Feb	Mar	Apr	May	Jun	Jul	Aug	Sep	Oct	Nov	Dec	Year
Mean daily maximum °F (°C)	30 (−1)	34 (1)	46 (8)	59 (15)	71 (22)	80 (27)	84 (29)	82 (28)	76 (24)	63 (17)	49 (9)	36 (2)	59 (15)
Mean daily minimum °F (°C)	14 (−10)	16 (−9)	26 (−3)	36 (2)	47 (8)	57 (14)	60 (16)	58 (14)	51 (11)	40 (4)	32 (0)	20 (−7)	38 (3)
Average precipitation inches (mm)	1.9 (48)	1.8 (46)	2.9 (74)	3.6 (91)	3.5 (89)	4.1 (100)	3.8 (97)	3.4 (86)	3.4 (86)	2.6 (66)	3.3 (84)	3.1 (79)	37.4 (946)
Source: weatherbase.com.

Severe weather

- On April 25, 1929, a tornado blew the roof off a service station in the town.

== Media ==
=== Newspapers ===
Churbusco has had seven news sources in its history, five of which have ceased publication.

- Churubusco News, weekly tabloid newspaper, 1994–present
- Busco Paper, weekly newspaper, 1914–1936
- Daily Busconian, daily newspaper, 1910
- Churubusco Tri-County Truth, weekly tabloid newspaper, 1891–1990, originally published as the Saturday Truth
- Churubusco Sunday People, weekly newspaper, January 17 – May 27, 1886
- Churubusco Weekly Herald, weekly newspaper, 1881–1882

=== Radio ===
- WXKE 96.3 MHz Radio format: Classic rock

== Notable people ==
- Martha Barnhart, officer in the Daughters of the American Revolution
- Paul Ashley Chase, (1878–1946), co-founding executive of Warner Brothers Pictures with Harry Warner
- Brent Gaff - professional baseball player
- Harry Gandy, (1881–1957), former U.S. Representative from South Dakota (March 4, 1915 – March 3, 1921)
- Craig W. Hartman, architect
- Sharon Wichman, Olympic gold medalist swimmer
