= Beast of Busco =

Folklore snapping turtle

Creature information
- Sub grouping: Lake monster
- Similar entities: alligator snapping turtle

Origin
- First attested: 1898
- Country: United States
- Region: Maumee Valley, Northern Indiana
- Details: Found in water

The Beast of Busco is a legendary creature in Indiana folklore, described as an unusually large snapping turtle. It was reportedly sighted by local residents near Churubusco, Indiana, in 1949, prompting a month-long search that attracted national attention. Despite extensive efforts to locate the animal, no conclusive evidence of its existence was found.

== History ==
In 1898, farmer Oscar Fulk claimed to have seen a giant turtle inhabiting a seven-acre (2.8 ha) lake on his farm near Churubusco, Indiana. He subsequently related his account to others but eventually abandoned his efforts to pursue the matter any further.

Nearly half a century later, in July 1948, two Churubusco residents, Ora Blue and Charley Wilson, reported seeing a large turtle while fishing on the same lake, by then known as Fulk Lake. They estimated the animal to weigh approximately 500 pounds (230 kilograms). At the time, the property was owned by farmer Gale Harris who, along with others, also reported seeing the creature. As accounts of the animal circulated, interest in the sightings began to grow.

In early 1949, a UPI reporter from Fort Wayne transmitted the story through the wire services, bringing the turtle to national attention. Curious crowds of sightseers subsequently descended on Harris’ property, prompting local authorities to call in the state police to manage traffic.

As doubts about the turtle's existence grew, Harris undertook several efforts to capture it. With the assistance of Orville Bright and Kenneth Leitch, he attempted to drain the lake by pumping its water into an area enclosed by a dam. However, when the lake was nearly empty, the dam broke, allowing the water to return. Despite these efforts, the turtle, which was named Oscar after the farm's original owner, was never captured.

In March 1949, an attempt to search the lake by employing the assistance of a deep-sea diver was pursued, although this undertaking was ultimately abandoned as the wrong equipment was delivered to the farm. Other efforts to locate or document the turtle likewise proved fruitless. Life Magazine photographer Mike Shea visited the site and took 299 photographs, but the images were ultimately deemed unusable.

== Cultural impact ==
Oscar's legacy lives on in Churubusco's annual Turtle Days festival, held each June. The festival features a parade, carnival, and turtle races.

A turtle shell labeled "Beast of Busco" is displayed at the Two Brothers Restaurant in Decatur, Indiana.

A small concrete statue depicting a turtle is located on the sidewalk at the main intersection in central Churubusco.
