= Port Mitchell, Indiana =

- Unincorporated community
- Location within Indiana Location within the United States
- Coordinates: 41°21′43″N 85°26′20″W
- Country: United States
- State: Indiana
- County: Noble
- Township: York
- Elevation: 899 ft (274 m)
- Time zone: UTC-5 (Eastern (EST))
  - Summer (DST): UTC-4 (EDT)
- ZIP code: 46701
- Area code: 260
- GNIS feature ID: 450580

Port Mitchell is an unincorporated community in York Township, Noble County, in the U.S. state of Indiana.

== History ==
Port Mitchell was laid out in 1838.

== Geography ==
Port Mitchell is located at 41°21′43″N 85°26′20″W.
