= Swan, Indiana =

- Unincorporated community
- Location within Indiana Location within the United States
- Coordinates: 41°18′57″N 85°12′45″W
- Country: United States
- State: Indiana
- County: Noble
- Township: Swan
- Elevation: 883 ft (269 m)
- Time zone: UTC-5 (Eastern (EST))
  - Summer (DST): UTC-4 (EDT)
- ZIP code: 46763
- Area code: 260
- GNIS feature ID: 450600

Swan is an unincorporated community in Swan Township, Noble County, in the U.S. state of Indiana.

== History ==
Swan was laid out in 1870, and named for its location in Swan Township. A post office was established at Swan in 1838, and remained in operation until 1918.

== Geography ==
Swan is located at 41°18′57″N 85°12′45″W.
