= Paul Ashley Chase =

- Chase in 1920
- Born: February 5, 1878; Churubusco, Indiana
- Died: April 17, 1946 (aged 68); North Hollywood, California
- Employer: Warner Brothers Pictures

Paul Ashley Chase (February 5, 1878 – April 17, 1946) was an American auditor and one of the founding executives, first auditor, Assistant Secretary of the corporation, and comptroller for Warner Brothers Pictures. He was previously the traveling auditor for the Erie Railroad. In 1912, Harry Warner and Paul were staying at the same boarding house in New York City. Harry Warner told Chase he was starting a new motion picture company and offered him the auditorship of the concern, which Chase immediately accepted.

== Biography ==
Chase was born in Churubusco, Indiana, on February 5, 1878. He spent his youth and young manhood in Leroy, Illinois, where his father, George Boyd Chase, owned and operated a jewelry store. His first job was as a telegrapher for a railroad company. However, he had a natural aptitude for numbers and eventually became the traveling auditor for the Erie Railroad.

He settled in New York City where he eventually met Harry Warner. He joined the Warner organization in 1912 and came to Hollywood in 1923; he served as controller for more than 25 years.

After Warner Brothers Pictures officially incorporated in 1923 under the name Warner Bros. Pictures, Inc., he accepted the position of comptroller and established the comptroller's office at the Sunset studios and the accounting department at the Sunset Bowling Center.

At the time of Paul Chase's death, he was the most tenured employee and one of the founding executives of Warner Brothers Pictures. His death was due to heart complications. He died April 17, 1946, at his home in North Hollywood, California. He was survived by his second wife, Hellen, and his daughter Esta Miller from his first wife Alice, who died in 1927. He was also survived by grandchildren Diana Miller and Kristina Miller. He had several great-grandchildren born after his death, including Karen Forster, Craig Forster, Michael McGee and Robert Bourell.
