= Brent Gaff =

American baseball player (born 1958)

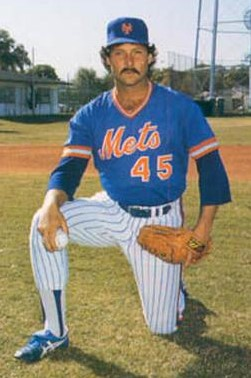
- Pitcher
- Born: October 5, 1958 (age 67); Fort Wayne, Indiana, U.S.
- Batted: Right Threw: Right

MLB debut
- July 7, 1982, for the New York Mets

Last MLB appearance
- September 30, 1984, for the New York Mets

MLB statistics
- Win–loss record: 4–5
- Earned run average: 4.06
- Strikeouts: 60
- Stats at Baseball Reference

Teams
- New York Mets (1982–1984)

Brent Allen Gaff (born October 5, 1958) is an American former professional baseball player who played for the New York Mets from 1982–84.

Gaff was born in Fort Wayne, Indiana and attended Churubusco High School in Churubusco, Indiana. He was drafted by the New York Mets in 6th the round (146th overall) of the 1977 Major League Baseball draft. He was 23 years old when he broke into the big leagues on July 7, 1982, with the New York Mets. Although the Mets lost the game, 3–2, to the San Francisco Giants, Mets manager George Bamberger was quoted as saying, "The kid's got good command of his stuff and great confidence in himself. His attitude's outstanding. He says 'Give me the ball and let me go.' I wanted him to win that game bad."

Gaff missed the entire 1985 season due to a partial tear of the rotator cuff in his right shoulder, and was released by the Mets in November of that year.
