= Ari, Indiana =

- Unincorporated community
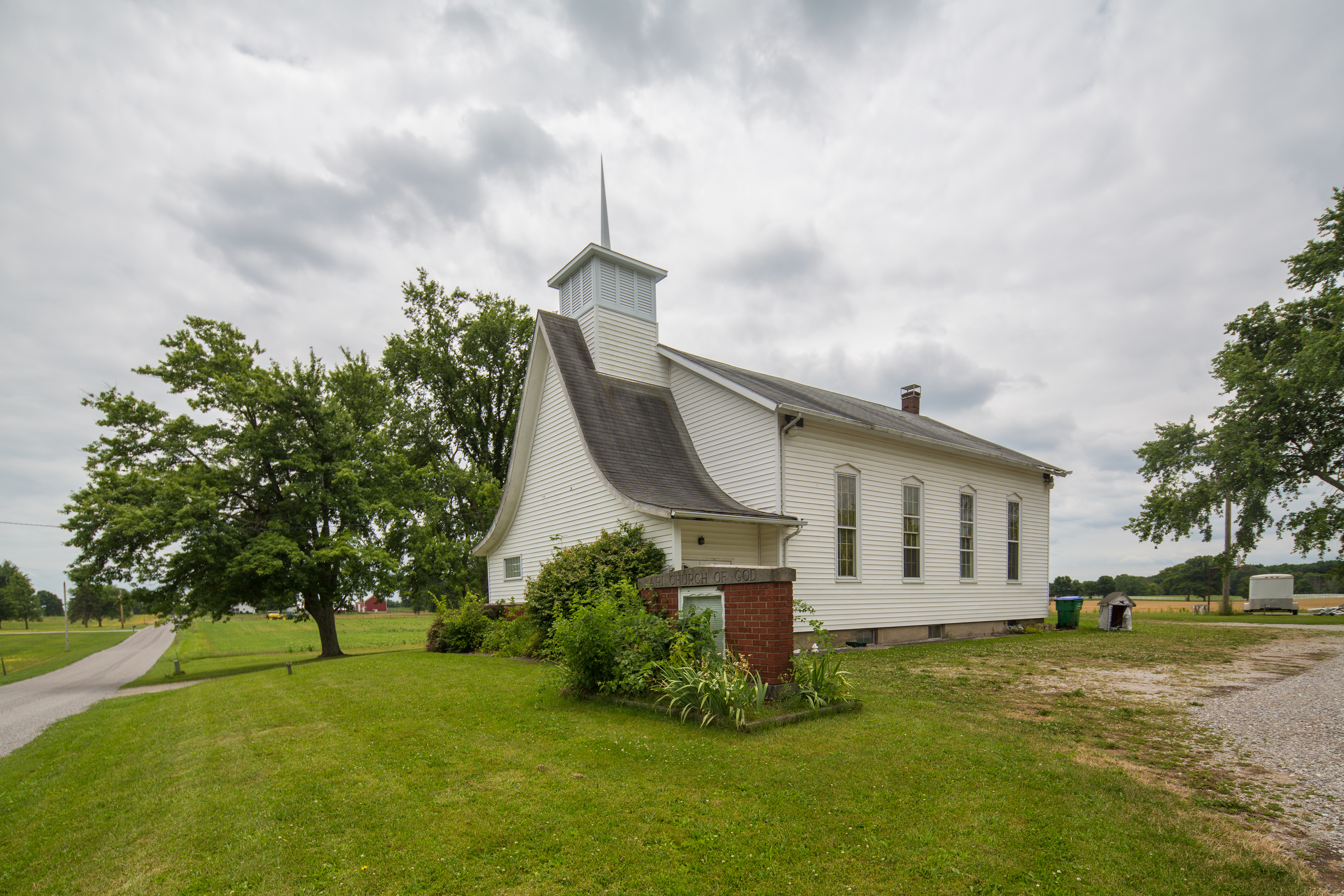

- Location within Indiana Location within the United States
- Coordinates: 41°15′49″N 85°14′58″W
- Country: United States
- State: Indiana
- County: Allen, Noble
- Townships: Eel River, Swan
- Elevation: 876 ft (267 m)
- Time zone: UTC-5 (Eastern (EST))
  - Summer (DST): UTC-4 (EDT)
- ZIP code: 46723
- Area code: 260
- FIPS code: 18-02062
- GNIS feature ID: 450509

Ari is an unincorporated community in Allen and Noble counties, in the U.S. state of Indiana.

== History ==
A post office was established at Ari in 1872, and remained in operation until it was discontinued in 1914.
