= Stanley School-District No. 2 =

Historic building in Indiana, US

- U.S. National Register of Historic Places
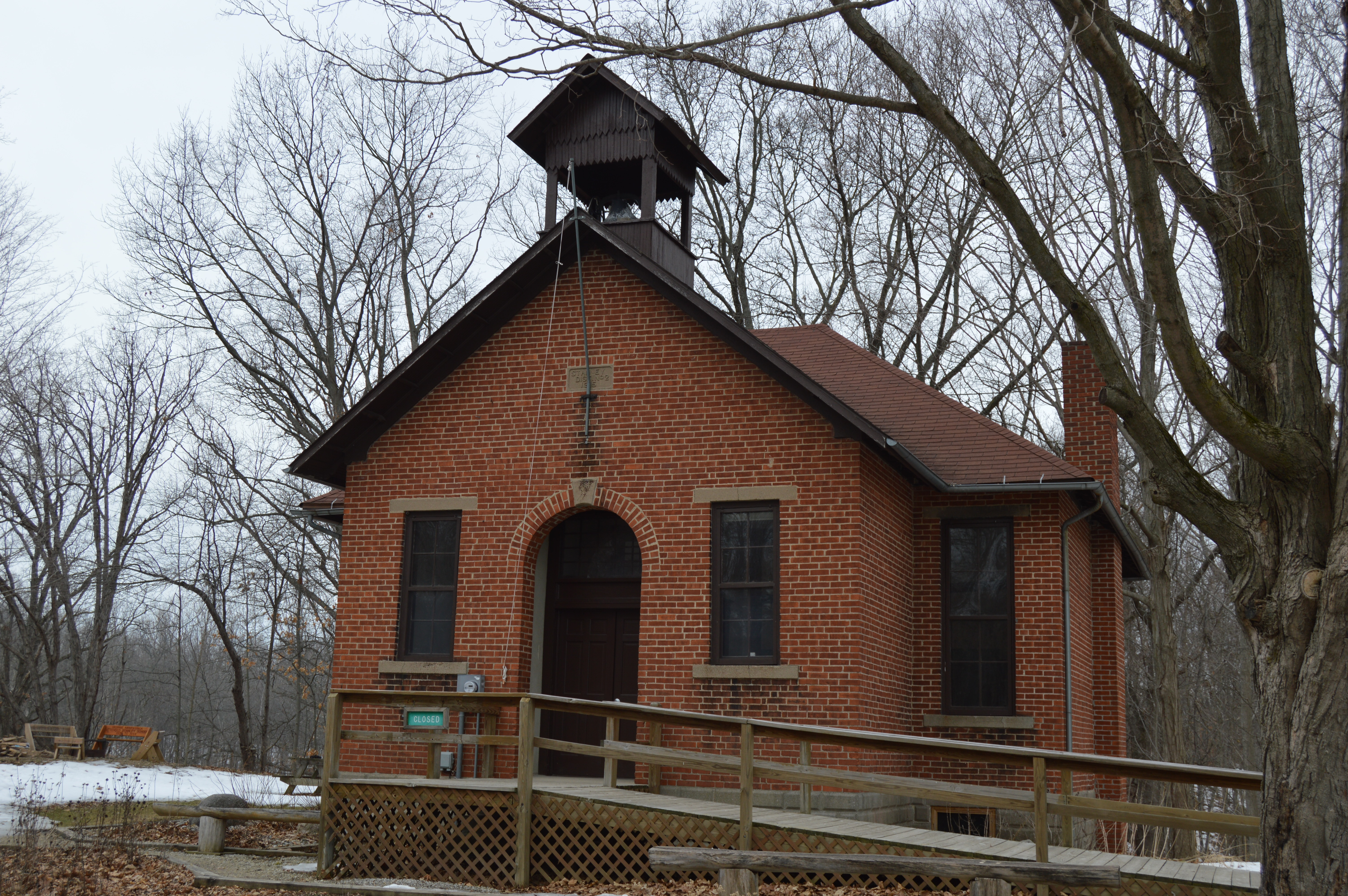
- Stanley School, March 2015

- Location within Indiana Location within the United States
- Location: S300E south of Albion, Indiana
- Coordinates: 41°20′17″N 85°21′57″W
- Area: Less than 1 acre (0.40 ha)
- Built: 1915
- MPS: Indiana's Public Common and High Schools
- NRHP reference No.: 14001038
- Added to NRHP: December 16, 2014

Stanley School-District No. 2 is a historic one-room school building located at Chain O'Lakes State Park in Green Township, Noble County, Indiana, United States. It was built in 1915, and is a one-story, "T"-plan, vernacular brick building. The front facade features a large central projecting gable topped by a belfry. The building operated as a school until 1954 and housed a nature center until 2013, when it was restored to a one-room school house.

It was listed on the National Register of Historic Places in 2014.
