= Veterans National Memorial Shrine and Museum =

Military museum in Allen County, Indiana

- Established: May 30, 2022
- Location: 2122 O'Day Road; Fort Wayne, Indiana, U.S.
- Coordinates: 41.0933°N 85.2463°W
- Type: history, military
- Curator: Robert Thomas
- Website: honoringforever.org

The Veterans National Memorial Shrine and Museum is a military and war museum in Fort Wayne, Indiana. The complex includes the W. Paul Wolf War History Museum and the Sterling Chapel.

== History ==
The museum, located on 40 acres in Allen County, was dedicated on Memorial Day in 2022. Its focus is on veterans of every branch of the United States Armed Forces and all wars that the United States has taken part in. The museum's collection features historic artifacts, vehicles, uniforms, and weapons from.

On May 2, 2024, the museum held a dedication service for their for Sterling Chapel, a memorial chapel on the museum grounds named in honor of Jeannette Mae Thompson Sterling, who was a long-time member of the Daughters of the American Revolution (DAR). The dedication ceremony was hosted by the Mary Penrose Wayne DAR Chapter and featured speakers from the University of Saint Francis, the Sons of the American Revolution, and the DAR, including honorary Indiana DAR state regent Martha Barnhart.

In December 2025, the museum closed for reorganization and so that a new storage and tracking system could be installed. The museum's grounds remained open to the public during the closure. The museum reopened in April 2026.

In June 2026, the museum dedicated two memorials honoring Indiana soldiers who served in the American Civil War.
