= Washington Township, Noble County, Indiana =

Washington Township
- Township
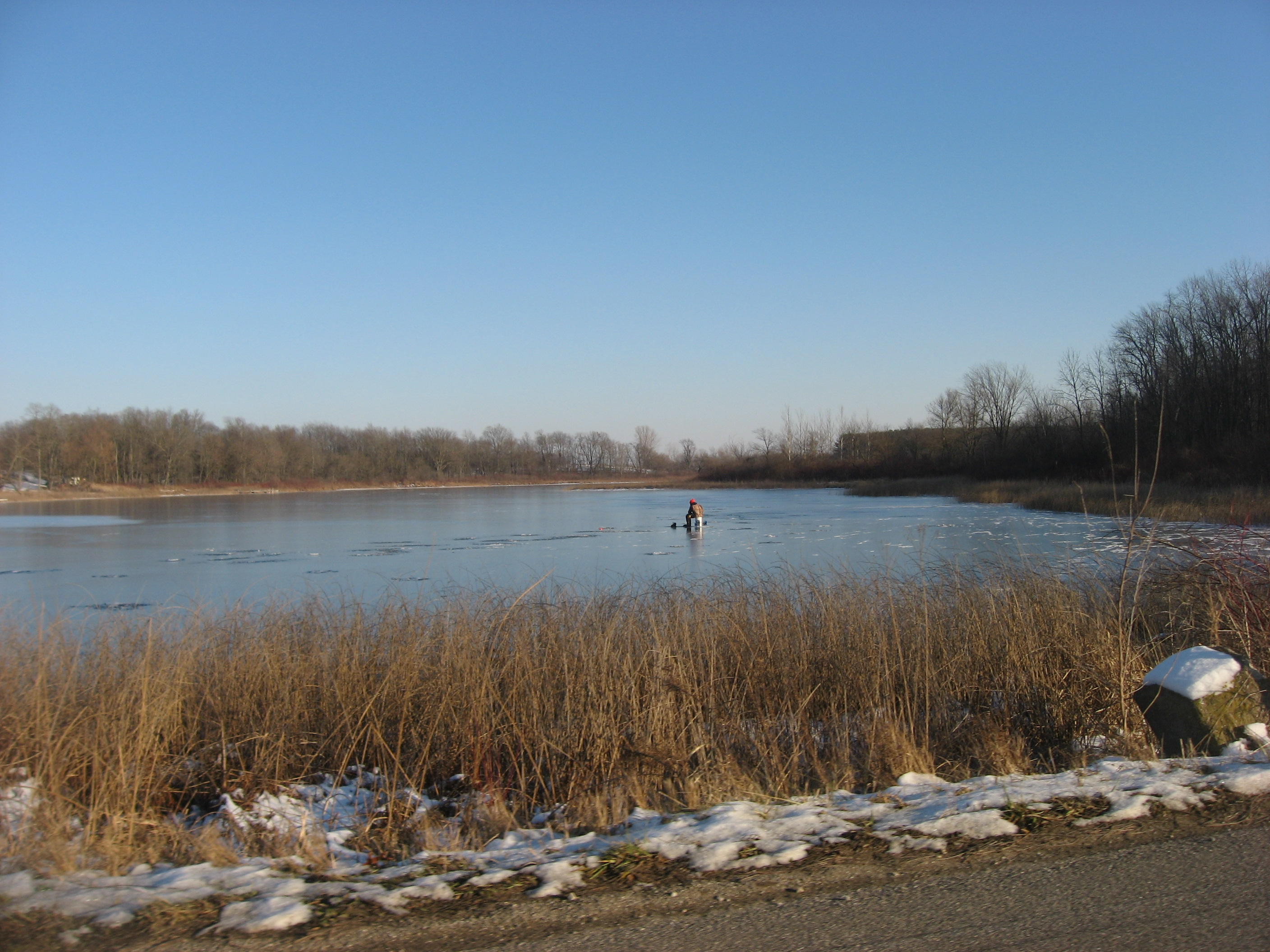
- Ice fishing on Gilbert Lake

- Coordinates: 41°19′25″N 85°35′29″W
- Country: United States
- State: Indiana
- County: Noble

Government
  - Type: Indiana township

Area
  - Total: 23.69 sq mi (61.4 km^{2})
  - Land: 23.05 sq mi (59.7 km^{2})
  - Water: 0.64 sq mi (1.7 km^{2})
- Elevation: 920 ft (280 m)

Population (2020)
  - Total: 1,073
  - Density: 52.1/sq mi (20.1/km^{2})
- Time zone: UTC-5 (Eastern (EST))
  - Summer (DST): UTC-4 (EDT)
- Area code: 260
- FIPS code: 18-80882
- GNIS feature ID: 454010

Washington Township is one of thirteen townships in Noble County, Indiana. As of the 2020 census, its population was 1,073 (down from 1,200 at 2010) and it contained 564 housing units.

== Geography ==
According to the 2010 census, the township has a total area of 23.69 square miles (61.4 km^{2}), of which 23.05 square miles (59.7 km^{2}) (or 97.30%) is land and 0.64 square miles (1.7 km^{2}) (or 2.70%) is water.

=== Unincorporated towns ===
- Ormas at 41.2950468°N 85.5460935°W
- Washington Center at 41.3250469°N 85.5972063°W
- Wilmot at 41.3100464°N 85.6416520°W

(This list is based on USGS data and may include former settlements.)
