= Ege, Indiana =

- Unincorporated community
- Location within Indiana Location within the United States
- Coordinates: 41°17′34″N 85°17′16″W
- Country: United States
- State: Indiana
- County: Noble
- Township: Swan
- Elevation: 915 ft (279 m)
- Time zone: UTC-5 (Eastern (EST))
  - Summer (DST): UTC-4 (EDT)
- ZIP code: 46763
- Area code: 260
- GNIS feature ID: 450533

Ege is an unincorporated community in Swan Township, Noble County, in the U.S. state of Indiana.

== History ==
A post office was established at Ege in 1885, and remained in operation until it was discontinued in 1903.
