= Green Center, Indiana =

- Unincorporated community
- Location within Indiana Location within the United States
- Coordinates: 41°18′30″N 85°21′58″W
- Country: United States
- State: Indiana
- County: Noble
- Township: Green
- Elevation: 988 ft (301 m)
- Time zone: UTC-5 (Eastern (EST))
  - Summer (DST): UTC-4 (EDT)
- ZIP code: 46701
- Area code: 260
- GNIS feature ID: 449754

Green Center is an unincorporated community in Green Township, Noble County, in the U.S. state of Indiana.

== History ==
A post office as established at Green Center in 1870, and remained in operation until it was discontinued in 1903. The community's location at the geographical center of Green Township caused the name to be selected.

== Geography ==
Green Center is located at 41°18′30″N 85°21′58″W.
