= Ormas, Indiana =

- Unincorporated community
- Ormas, as seen in a map of Whitley County
- Coordinates: 41°17′43″N 85°32′45″W
- Country: United States
- State: Indiana
- County: Whitley, Noble
- Township: Etna-Troy, Washington
- Elevation: 906 ft (276 m)
- Time zone: UTC-5 (Eastern (EST))
  - Summer (DST): UTC-4 (EDT)
- ZIP code: 46725
- Area code: 260
- GNIS feature ID: 450573

Ormas is an unincorporated community in Whitley and Noble counties, in the U.S. state of Indiana.

== History ==
Ormas was founded in 1856. The community's name honors Ormas Jones, an early settler.

A post office was established at Ormas in 1880, and remained in operation until it was discontinued in 1904.

== Geography ==
Ormas is located at 41°17′43″N 85°32′45″W.
