= William H. Parker (politician) =

American politician (1847–1908)

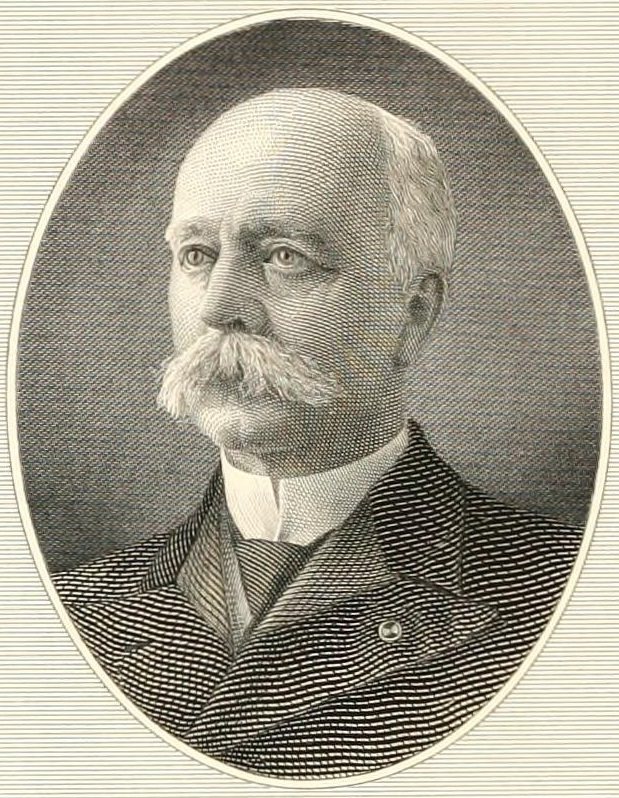
- Frontispiece of 1909's William H. Parker, a Representative from South Dakota

Member of the U.S. House of Representatives from South Dakota's at-large district
- In office March 4, 1907 – June 26, 1908
- Preceded by: Eben Martin
- Succeeded by: Eben Martin

Personal details
- Born: May 5, 1847 Keene, New Hampshire, U.S.
- Died: June 26, 1908 (aged 61) Deadwood, South Dakota, U.S.
- Resting place: Arlington National Cemetery
- Party: Republican
- Spouse: Clara E. Thomas (m. 1867)
- Children: 2
- Relatives: William H. Parker (grandson)
- Education: Columbian College (LL.B., 1868)
- Occupation: Attorney

Military service
- Allegiance: United States (Union)
- Branch/service: Union Army
- Years of service: 1861–1866
- Rank: Second Lieutenant (Army); First Lieutenant (Brevet)
- Unit: 2nd New Hampshire Infantry; 14th New Hampshire Infantry; 6th Regiment, Veteran Reserve Corps; 6th U.S. Volunteer Infantry
- Wars: American Civil War

William Henry Parker (May 5, 1847 – June 26, 1908) was an American attorney, South Dakota politician, and American Civil War veteran. Parker served as an assistant United States attorney for the District of Colorado and was a member of the United States House of Representatives from South Dakota.

== Early life and American Civil War ==
Parker was born in Keene, New Hampshire on May 5, 1847. He was educated locally and at age 14 joined the Union Army for the American Civil War. He served as a private in the 2nd New Hampshire Infantry, 14th New Hampshire Infantry, and 6th Regiment of the Veteran Reserve Corps. He later received a Second Lieutenant's commission in the 6th U.S. Volunteer Infantry, and he ended the war as a Brevet First Lieutenant.

== Law career ==
After the war Parker began law school at Columbian College (now George Washington University), from which he graduated in 1868. Parker practiced law, and in 1874 he was appointed the federal collector of internal revenue for Colorado Territory. In 1876 he was appointed Assistant United States Attorney for the District of Colorado. He moved to Deadwood, Dakota Territory (now South Dakota), in July 1877, where he continued to practice law.

== Political career ==
Parker was a delegate to the territorial constitutional convention which led to South Dakota's statehood in 1885. A Republican, he served in the South Dakota House of Representatives in 1889. From 1903 to 1907 he was prosecuting attorney of Lawrence County.

In 1906 Parker was elected to Seat B, one of South Dakota's two at-large seats in the United States House of Representatives. He served in the 60th United States Congress from March 4, 1907 until his death.

== Death and legacy ==
Parker died at St. Joseph's Hospital in Deadwood on June 26, 1908 due to cirrhosis of the liver. He was buried at Arlington National Cemetery, Section 3, Grave 2115.

He was the grandfather of William H. Parker, who served as Chief of the Los Angeles Police Department from 1950 to 1966.

== See also ==
- List of members of the United States Congress who died in office (1900–1949)
- South Dakota's at-large congressional district
- South Dakota's congressional delegations

U.S. House of Representatives
| Preceded by Eben Martin | Member of the U.S. House of Representatives from South Dakota's at-large congressional district 1907–1908 | Succeeded by Eben Martin |
