= Lisbon, Indiana =

- Unincorporated community
- Location within Indiana Location within the United States
- Coordinates: 41°24′40″N 85°15′35″W
- Country: United States
- State: Indiana
- County: Noble
- Township: Allen
- Elevation: 1,033 ft (315 m)
- Time zone: UTC-5 (Eastern (EST))
  - Summer (DST): UTC-4 (EDT)
- ZIP code: 46755
- Area code: 260
- GNIS feature ID: 437978

Lisbon is an unincorporated community in Allen Township, Noble County, in the U.S. state of Indiana.

== History ==
Lisbon was platted in 1847. According to Ronald L. Baker, the community probably was named after Lisbon, the capital of Portugal. A post office was established at Lisbon in 1849, and remained in operation until it was discontinued in 1919.

== Geography ==
Lisbon is located at 41°24′40″N 85°15′35″W.
