= Eben Martin =

American politician

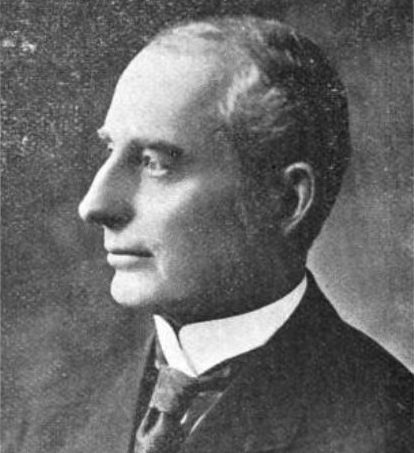

Member of the U.S. House of Representatives from South Dakota
- In office March 3, 1901 – March 4, 1907
- Preceded by: Robert J. Gamble
- Succeeded by: William H. Parker
- Constituency: at-large district
- In office November 3, 1908 – March 3, 1915
- Preceded by: William H. Parker
- Succeeded by: Harry L. Gandy
- Constituency: at-large district (1908–13); 3rd district (1913–15)

Personal details
- Born: Eben Wever Martin; April 12, 1855 Maquoketa, Iowa, U.S.
- Died: May 22, 1932 (aged 77) Hot Springs, South Dakota, U.S.
- Party: Republican
- Education: Cornell College (BA); University of Michigan (LLB)

Eben Wever Martin (April 12, 1855 – May 22, 1932) was an American attorney and politician in South Dakota. A Republican, he served as a member of the United States House of Representatives during the early 20th Century.

== Early life and education ==
Martin was born in Maquoketa, Iowa. He attended the public schools of his hometown, and in 1879 he graduated from Cornell College in Mount Vernon, Iowa. He studied at the University of Michigan Law School in 1879 and 1880, was admitted to the bar in 1880 and commenced practice in Deadwood, Dakota Territory.

== Congress ==
Martin served in the South Dakota Territory House of Representatives in 1884 and 1885, and was president of Deadwood's board of education from 1886 to 1900.

In 1900, Martin was elected as a Republican to Seat B, one of South Dakota's two at-large seats in the United States House of Representatives. He was reelected in 1902 and 1904, and served from March 4, 1901, to March 3, 1907. He ran unsuccessfully for the United States Senate in 1906.

After the death of William H. Parker, Martin won a special election to fill the Seat B vacancy in the U.S. House, and was re-elected to three more terms, serving from November 3, 1908, to March 3, 1915. As a result of the 1910 United States census, South Dakota was apportioned three House members and created three districts. In Martin's 1912 reelection he ran successfully for South Dakota's 3rd congressional district seat. He was not a candidate for re-election in 1914.

== Later career ==
After leaving Congress, Martin practiced law in Hot Springs, South Dakota.

== Death and burial ==
He died in Hot Springs on May 22, 1932, and was buried in the city's Evergreen Cemetery.

== Legacy ==
Martin is the namesake of the city of Martin, South Dakota.

U.S. House of Representatives
Preceded by Robert J. Gamble	Member of the U.S. House of Representatives from South Dakota's at-large congressional district March 4, 1901 – March 3, 1907	Succeeded by William H. Parker
Preceded by William H. Parker	Member of the U.S. House of Representatives from South Dakota's at-large congressional district November 3, 1908 – March 3, 1913	Succeeded by District inactive
Preceded by New District	Member of the U.S. House of Representatives from South Dakota's 3rd congressional district March 4, 1913 – March 3, 1915	Succeeded by Harry L. Gandy
