= Wakeville Village, Indiana =

- Unincorporated community
- Location within Indiana Location within the United States
- Coordinates: 41°27′47″N 85°15′25″W
- Country: United States
- State: Indiana
- County: Noble
- Township: Wayne
- Elevation: 961 ft (293 m)
- Time zone: UTC-5 (Eastern (EST))
  - Summer (DST): UTC-4 (EDT)
- ZIP code: 46755
- Area code: 260
- GNIS feature ID: 445363

Wakeville Village is an unincorporated community in Wayne Township, Noble County, in the U.S. state of Indiana.

== Geography ==
Wakeville Village is located at 41°27′47″N 85°15′25″W.
