= South Dakota's 3rd congressional district =

Coordinates: 44°40′N 101°40′W

- Obsolete district
- Created: 1910
- Eliminated: 1930
- Years active: 1913–1933

South Dakota's 3rd congressional district is an obsolete United States congressional district. It was created after the 1910 census and abolished after the 1930 census. The district covered all of the counties in South Dakota west of the Missouri River.

== List of members representing the district ==
Member (Residence)	Party	Years	Cong ress	Electoral history
District established March 4, 1913
Eben W. Martin (Deadwood)	Republican	March 4, 1913 – March 3, 1915	63rd	Redistricted from the at-large district and re-elected in 1912. Retired.
Harry L. Gandy (Rapid City)	Democratic	March 4, 1915 – March 3, 1921	64th 65th 66th	Elected in 1914. Re-elected in 1916. Re-elected in 1918. Lost re-election.
William Williamson (Rapid City)	Republican	March 4, 1921 – March 3, 1933	67th 68th 69th 70th 71st 72nd	Elected in 1920. Re-elected in 1922. Re-elected in 1924. Re-elected in 1926. Re-elected in 1928. Re-elected in 1930. Redistricted to the 2nd district and lost renomination.
District dissolved March 4, 1933
