= William Williamson (American politician) =

American politician

William D. Williamson
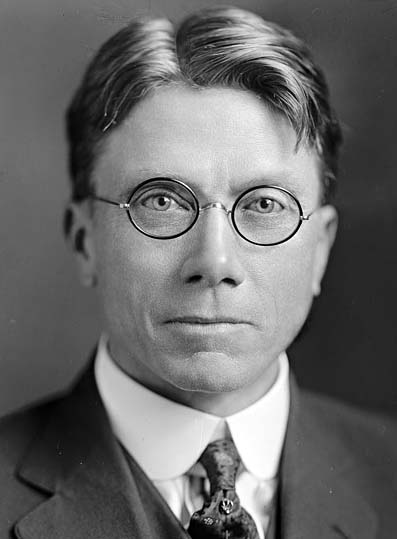

Member of the U.S. House of Representatives from South Dakota's 3rd district
- In office March 4, 1921 – March 3, 1933
- Preceded by: Harry L. Gandy
- Succeeded by: constituency abolished

Personal details
- Born: October 7, 1875 Mahaska County, Iowa, U.S.
- Died: July 15, 1972 (aged 96) Custer, South Dakota, U.S.
- Party: Republican
- Education: University of South Dakota School of Law
- Occupation: Attorney; newspaper publisher

William Williamson (October 7, 1875 – July 15, 1972) was an American teacher, lawyer, and judge who served as a U.S. representative from South Dakota's 3rd congressional district from 1921 to 1933, as a member of the Republican Party. He was the final representative of the 3rd district before its dissolution.

== Biography ==
William Williamson was born near New Sharon in Mahaska County, Iowa, to the Norwegian immigrants Vilum Vilumson Halleland and Maren Ingebretsdatter Erland, who had left their homeplace in Skjold Municipality near the town of Haugesund in 1872. In 1882, he moved with his parents to Plankinton, Aurora County, South Dakota. He married Clara Victoria Dice, a German-American. Williamson did comprehend, but was not a fluent speaker of Norwegian.

== Education ==
He attended public school for his elementary education. In 1903 he graduated from the University of South Dakota at Vermillion and then in 1905 from the University of South Dakota School of Law.

== Career ==
He did not take the bar exam as he was admitted to the bar in 1905 under diploma privilege. He began his law practice in Oacoma, South Dakota in Lyman County in that same year. He was a co-founder (along with his brother) of Murdo Coyote and the Prairie Sun.

From 1905 to 1911 he was prosecuting attorney of Lyman County. From 1911 until 1921 he served as circuit court judge for the 11th judicial district.

From March 1921 to March 1933 he was elected as a Republican to Congress (five succeeding terms). In 1912 he was a delegate to the Republican National Convention, and served as chairman on the Committee on Expenditures in the Department of the Interior for the 68th and 69th Congresses; and Committee on Expenditures in Executive Departments for the 70th and 71st Congresses. In 1932, following redistricting, Williamson ran for the reelection in South Dakota's 2nd congressional district but was defeated by the Democrat Theodore B. Werner, marking the end of his congressional tenure.

== Post political career ==
He resumed his law practice in Rapid City, and was special assistant attorney general of South Dakota and assigned as general counsel for the Public Utilities Commission 1939–1951, and also the Department of Insurance of South Dakota.

During the years of 1929 to 1972 he was a member of the Mount Rushmore National Memorial Commission.

== Death ==
He died on July 15, 1972, in Custer, South Dakota.

U.S. House of Representatives
Preceded by Harry L. Gandy	United States Representative (3rd district) for South Dakota; 1921–1933	Succeeded by none
