= Allen Township, Noble County, Indiana =

Allen Township
- Township
- Location in Noble County
- Coordinates: 41°23′32″N 85°14′51″W
- Country: United States
- State: Indiana
- County: Noble

Government
  - Type: Indiana township

Area
  - Total: 35.85 sq mi (92.9 km^{2})
  - Land: 35.76 sq mi (92.6 km^{2})
  - Water: 0.08 sq mi (0.21 km^{2}) 0.22%
- Elevation: 974 ft (297 m)

Population (2020)
  - Total: 7,029
  - Density: 199.5/sq mi (77.0/km^{2})
- Time zone: UTC-5 (Eastern (EST))
  - Summer (DST): UTC-4 (EDT)
- ZIP codes: 46710, 46755
- Area code: 260
- GNIS feature ID: 453086
- Website: allentownshiptrustee.org

Allen Township is one of thirteen townships in Noble County, Indiana, United States. As of the 2020 census, its population was 7,029 (down from 7,134 at 2010) and it contained 3,000 housing units.

== Geography ==
According to the 2010 census, the township has a total area of 35.85 square miles (92.9 km^{2}), of which 35.76 square miles (92.6 km^{2}) (or 99.75%) is land and 0.08 square miles (0.21 km^{2}) (or 0.22%) is water.

=== Cities, towns, villages ===
- Avilla
- Kendallville (south side)

=== Unincorporated towns ===
- Lisbon at 41.411161°N 85.259697°W

(This list is based on USGS data and may include former settlements.)

=== Cemeteries ===
The township contains Saint Marys Cemetery. Information about decedents buried in this cemetery is available through the Indiana Genealogical Society, Fort Wayne, Indiana. The Lisbon Cemetery is accessed via a private drive off West Lisbon Road. Information about decedents buried in this cemetery is available through the Indiana Genealogical Society, Fort Wayne, Indiana.

=== Major highways ===
- Indiana State Road 3
- Indiana State Road 8

== School districts ==
- East Noble School Corporation

== Political districts ==
- Indiana's 3rd congressional district
- State House District 52
- State Senate District 13
