= Craig Munk =

Craig Munk is an American retired theatre educator who was employed by East Noble High School in Kendallville, Indiana during his career.

== Early life and education ==
Munk attended middle school in Rome City, Indiana before relocating to Kendalllville and attended East Noble High school, where he became involved in theatre. He graduated in 1964 and attended Ball State University to study art. He returned to Kendallville in 1968 to teach the art program.

== Career and recognition ==
His career spanned forty-eight years. He was named "Citizen of the Year" in 2012. He retired in 2016 and appeared on the Today Show with his wife. His appearance on the program received coverage from American theatre news website BroadwayWorld. That same year, he was nominated for the "2016 Excellence in Theatre Education Award", which was sponsored by the Tony Awards. Previously, he was given the Kendallville Key to the City. He has also received the Sagamore of the Wabash from former Indiana governor O’Bannon.
