= Noble County, Indiana =

County in Indiana, United States

- County
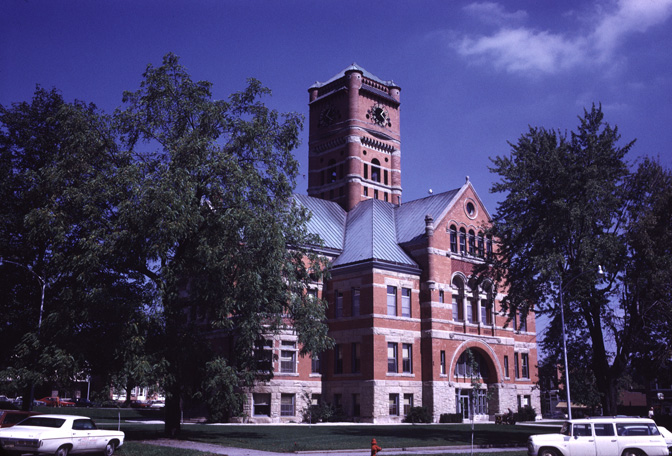
- Noble County Courthouse in Albion

- Flag

- Location within the U.S. state of Indiana
- Coordinates: 41°24′N 85°25′W
- Country: United States
- State: Indiana
- Founded: February 7, 1835 (authorized); 1836 (organized)
- Named for: Governor Noah Noble
- Seat: Albion
- Largest city: Kendallville

Area
  - Total: 417.43 sq mi (1,081.1 km^{2})
  - Land: 410.84 sq mi (1,064.1 km^{2})
  - Water: 6.59 sq mi (17.1 km^{2}) 1.58%

Population (2020)
  - Total: 47,457
  - Estimate (2025): 47,937 ▲
  - Density: 117/sq mi (45/km^{2})
- Time zone: UTC−5 (Eastern)
  - Summer (DST): UTC−4 (EDT)
- Congressional district: 3rd
- Website: Noble County
- Indiana county number 57

Noble County is a county in the U.S. state of Indiana. As of the 2020 United States census, the population was 47,457. The county seat is Albion. The county is divided into 13 townships which provide local services. Noble County comprises the Kendallville, IN Micropolitan Statistical Area and is included in the Fort Wayne-Huntington-Auburn, IN Combined Statistical Area.

== History ==
Noble County's government was organized beginning in 1836. The county was named for a family that was influential in Indiana politics at the time, including the Indiana governor at the time (1831–1837) Noah Noble and his brother, James, who served as the state's first senator after it gained statehood.

Noble County's first homesteaders came from New England, known as "Yankees"; people descended from the English Puritans who settled New England in the 1600s. They were part of a wave of New Englanders who migrated west to what was then the Northwest Territory during the early 1800s. This migration was sparked as a result of the completion of the Erie Canal and conclusion of the Black Hawk War. They founded the towns of Kendallville and Albion.

== Geography ==
Noble County is in the state's northeast corner. Its low, rolling terrain is dotted with lakes and wetlands, but is otherwise entirely devoted to agriculture or urban development. Its highest point (1,073 feet/327 meters ASL), Sand Hill in Wayne Township, near the county's north line with LaGrange County, is the state's second-highest named point. The Elkhart River flows from the NW part of the county into Elkhart County.

According to the 2010 United States census, Noble County has a total area of 417.43 square miles (1,081.1 km^{2}), of which 410.84 square miles (1,064.1 km^{2}) (or 98.42%) is land and 6.59 square miles (17.1 km^{2}) (or 1.58%) is water.

=== Adjacent counties ===
- LaGrange County - north
- Steuben County - northeast
- DeKalb County - east
- Allen County - southeast
- Whitley County - south
- Kosciusko County - southwest
- Elkhart County - northwest

=== Cities ===
- Kendallville
- Ligonier

=== Towns ===
- Albion
- Avilla
- Cromwell
- Rome City
- Wolcottville

=== Unincorporated communities ===
- Ari
- Bakertown
- Bear Lake
- Brimfield
- Burr Oak
- Cosperville
- Ege
- Green Center
- Indian Village
- Kimmell (census-designated place)
- LaOtto
- Lisbon
- Merriam
- Ormas
- Port Mitchell
- Swan
- Wakeville Village
- Washington Center
- Wawaka
- Wayne Center
- Wilmot
- Wolf Lake

=== Townships ===
- Albion
- Allen
- Elkhart
- Green
- Jefferson
- Noble
- Orange
- Perry
- Sparta
- Swan
- Washington
- Wayne
- York

=== Major highways ===
- U.S. Route 6
- U.S. Route 33
- Indiana State Road 3
- Indiana State Road 5
- Indiana State Road 8
- Indiana State Road 9
- Indiana State Road 109
- Indiana State Road 205

=== Major lakes ===
- Axel Lake
- Bartley Lake
- Big Lake
- Bixler Lake
- Bristol Lake
- Cree Lake
- Crooked Lake (part)
- Diamond Lake
- Eagle Lake
- Engle Lake
- Gordy Lake
- Grannis Lake
- Jones Lake
- Knapp Lake
- Latta Lake
- Lindsey Lake
- Little Long Lake
- Loon Lake (part)
- Lower Long Lake
- Marl Lake
- Millers Lake
- Moore Lake
- Moss Lake
- Mud
- Pleasant Lake
- Port Mitchell Lake
- Roudy Lake
- Round Lake
- Schockopee Lake
- Skinner Lake
- Sparta Lake
- Summit Lake
- Sylvan Lake
- Upper Long Lake
- Waldron Lake
- West Lakes
- Wible Lake

=== Protected areas ===
- Chain O'Lakes State Park
- Eagle Lake Wetland Conservation Area
- Hammer Wetland Nature Preserve
- Mallard Roost Wetland Conservation Area
- Mendenhall Wetland Conservation Area
- Pioneer Trails Camp
- Rome City Wetland Conservation Area
- West Lakes Conservation Inc Tract

== Climate and weather ==
Albion, Indiana

Climate chart (precipitation, max. and min. temperature)
J	F	M	A	M	J	J	A	S	O	N	D
2.1 31 14	1.8 35 18	2.9 46 27	3.7 58 37	3.7 70 48	4.4 79 58	3.8 83 62	3.6 81 59	3.5 74 51	2.8 62 40	3.3 48 31	2.9 36 21
- █ Average max. and min. temperatures in °F
- █ Precipitation totals in inches
- Source: The Weather Channel
Metric conversion
J	F	M	A	M	J	J	A	S	O	N	D
54 −1 −10	46 2 −8	74 8 −3	93 14 3	94 21 9	113 26 14	97 28 17	91 27 15	89 23 11	71 17 4	84 9 −1	73 2 −6
- █ Average max. and min. temperatures in °C
- █ Precipitation totals in mm

In recent years, average temperatures in Albion have ranged from a low of 14 °F (−10 °C) in January to a high of 83 °F (28 °C) in July, although a record low of −24 °F (−31 °C) was recorded in January 1994 and a record high of 103 °F (39 °C) was recorded in June 1988. Average monthly precipitation ranged from 1.80 inches (46 mm) in February to 4.44 inches (113 mm) in June.

== Demographics ==
Historical population
Census	Pop.	Note	%±
1840	2,702		—
1850	7,946		194.1%
1860	14,915		87.7%
1870	20,389		36.7%
1880	22,956		12.6%
1890	23,359		1.8%
1900	23,533		0.7%
1910	24,009		2.0%
1920	22,470		−6.4%
1930	22,404		−0.3%
1940	22,776		1.7%
1950	25,075		10.1%
1960	28,162		12.3%
1970	31,382		11.4%
1980	35,443		12.9%
1990	37,877		6.9%
2000	46,275		22.2%
2010	47,536		2.7%
2020	47,457		−0.2%
2025 (est.)	47,937	▲	1.0%
US Decennial Census; 1790-1960 1900-90; 1990-2000 2010 2020 2025

=== Racial and ethnic composition ===
Noble County, Indiana – Racial and ethnic composition Note: the US Census treats Hispanic/Latino as an ethnic category. This table excludes Latinos from the racial categories and assigns them to a separate category. Hispanics/Latinos may be of any race.
Race / Ethnicity (NH = Non-Hispanic)	Pop 1980	Pop 1990	Pop 2000	Pop 2010	Pop 2020	% 1980	% 1990	% 2000	% 2010	% 2020
White alone (NH)	34,982	37,010	42,221	42,104	40,235	98.70%	97.71%	91.24%	88.57%	84.78%
Black or African American alone (NH)	28	58	172	170	217	0.08%	0.15%	0.37%	0.36%	0.46%
Native American or Alaska Native alone (NH)	37	80	94	90	71	0.10%	0.21%	0.20%	0.19%	0.15%
Asian alone (NH)	29	98	166	174	223	0.08%	0.26%	0.36%	0.37%	0.47%
Native Hawaiian or Pacific Islander alone (NH)	x	x	8	5	1	x	x	0.02%	0.01%	0.00%
Other race alone (NH)	21	6	8	27	104	0.06%	0.02%	0.02%	0.06%	0.22%
Mixed race or Multiracial (NH)	x	x	307	399	1,356	x	x	0.66%	0.84%	2.86%
Hispanic or Latino (any race)	346	625	3,299	4,567	5,250	0.98%	1.65%	7.13%	9.61%	11.06%
Total	35,443	37,877	46,275	47,536	47,457	100.00%	100.00%	100.00%	100.00%	100.00%

=== 2020 census ===
As of the 2020 census, the county had a population of 47,457. The median age was 39.0 years. 25.1% of residents were under the age of 18 and 16.9% of residents were 65 years of age or older. For every 100 females there were 100.3 males, and for every 100 females age 18 and over there were 98.9 males age 18 and over.

The racial makeup of the county was 87.1% White, 0.5% Black or African American, 0.4% American Indian and Alaska Native, 0.5% Asian, <0.1% Native Hawaiian and Pacific Islander, 5.3% from some other race, and 6.1% from two or more races. Hispanic or Latino residents of any race comprised 11.1% of the population.

22.3% of residents lived in urban areas, while 77.7% lived in rural areas.

There were 17,981 households in the county, of which 32.7% had children under the age of 18 living in them. Of all households, 53.3% were married-couple households, 17.5% were households with a male householder and no spouse or partner present, and 21.5% were households with a female householder and no spouse or partner present. About 25.3% of all households were made up of individuals and 10.8% had someone living alone who was 65 years of age or older.

There were 20,049 housing units, of which 10.3% were vacant. Among occupied housing units, 76.2% were owner-occupied and 23.8% were renter-occupied. The homeowner vacancy rate was 1.3% and the rental vacancy rate was 8.8%.

=== 2010 census ===
As of the 2010 United States census, there were 47,536 people, 17,355 households, and 12,591 families in the county. The population density was 115.7 inhabitants per square mile (44.7/km^{2}). There were 20,109 housing units at an average density of 48.9 per square mile (18.9/km^{2}). The racial makeup of the county was 92.5% white, 0.4% black or African American, 0.4% Asian, 0.2% American Indian, 5.2% from other races, and 1.3% from two or more races. Those of Hispanic or Latino origin made up 9.6% of the population. In terms of ancestry, 32.2% claimed German, 11.1% claimed American, 9.8% claimed Irish, and 8.5% claimed English.

Of the 17,355 households, 35.9% had children under the age of 18 living with them, 57.2% were married couples living together, 10.0% had a female householder with no husband present, 27.5% were non-families, and 22.9% of all households were made up of individuals. The average household size was 2.69 and the average family size was 3.16. The median age was 37.1 years.

The median income for a household in the county was $47,697 and the median income for a family was $53,959. Males had a median income of $40,335 versus $29,887 for females. The per capita income for the county was $19,783. About 7.6% of families and 11.4% of the population were below the poverty line, including 16.4% of those under age 18 and 6.5% of those age 65 or over.

== Government ==
The county government is a constitutional body granted specific powers by the Constitution of Indiana and the Indiana Code. The county council is the legislative branch of the county government, controlling spending and revenue collection. Representatives are elected to four-year terms from county districts. The council members are responsible for setting salaries, the annual budget and special spending. The council has limited authority to impose local taxes, in the form of an income and property tax that is subject to state level approval, excise taxes and service taxes.

The executive body of the county is the board of commissioners. The commissioners are elected county-wide to staggered four-year terms. One commissioner serves as president. The commissioners execute the acts legislated by the council, collect revenue and manage the county government.

The county maintains a small claims court that handles civil cases. The judge on the court is elected to a term of four years and must be a member of the Indiana Bar Association. The judge is assisted by a constable who is elected to a four-year term. In some cases, court decisions can be appealed to the state level circuit court.

The county has other elected offices, including sheriff, coroner, auditor, treasurer, recorder, surveyor and circuit court clerk. Each officer serves a term of four years and oversees a different part of county government. Members elected to county government positions are required to declare party affiliations and be residents of the county.

Each township has a trustee who administers rural fire protection and ambulance service, provides poor relief and manages cemetery care, among other duties. The trustee is assisted in these duties by a three-member township board. The trustees and board members are elected to four-year terms.

Noble County is part of Indiana's 3rd congressional district and is represented by Jim Banks in the United States Congress. It is part of Indiana Senate district 13 and Indiana House of Representatives district 82.

United States presidential election results for Noble County, Indiana
Year	Republican		Democratic		Third party(ies)	
Year	No.	%	No.	%	No.	%
1888	3,026	49.16%	2,979	48.39%	151	2.45%
1892	2,823	47.09%	2,879	48.02%	293	4.89%
1896	3,372	51.78%	3,071	47.16%	69	1.06%
1900	3,100	49.18%	3,077	48.82%	126	2.00%
1904	3,683	55.57%	2,785	42.02%	160	2.41%
1908	3,507	50.72%	3,249	46.99%	158	2.29%
1912	1,443	22.89%	2,888	45.81%	1,973	31.30%
1916	3,417	51.33%	3,069	46.10%	171	2.57%
1920	6,820	60.82%	4,148	36.99%	245	2.18%
1924	5,793	55.72%	4,163	40.04%	441	4.24%
1928	6,338	59.76%	4,207	39.67%	60	0.57%
1932	5,304	44.32%	6,538	54.63%	126	1.05%
1936	5,760	48.26%	5,990	50.18%	186	1.56%
1940	7,443	59.46%	5,014	40.06%	60	0.48%
1944	7,200	62.89%	4,174	36.46%	74	0.65%
1948	6,503	57.33%	4,676	41.22%	165	1.45%
1952	8,203	65.39%	4,151	33.09%	190	1.51%
1956	8,175	66.64%	4,028	32.84%	64	0.52%
1960	8,069	60.27%	5,264	39.32%	54	0.40%
1964	5,682	42.52%	7,621	57.03%	60	0.45%
1968	6,699	51.35%	5,075	38.90%	1,272	9.75%
1972	7,916	64.75%	4,250	34.76%	60	0.49%
1976	6,885	52.91%	5,875	45.15%	253	1.94%
1980	7,624	57.40%	4,721	35.54%	937	7.05%
1984	8,459	65.74%	4,237	32.93%	171	1.33%
1988	7,889	65.26%	4,143	34.27%	57	0.47%
1992	5,883	42.90%	4,411	32.17%	3,419	24.93%
1996	6,782	50.17%	5,101	37.73%	1,636	12.10%
2000	9,103	64.03%	4,822	33.92%	291	2.05%
2004	10,859	69.26%	4,703	30.00%	117	0.75%
2008	9,673	56.88%	7,064	41.54%	270	1.59%
2012	10,680	65.63%	5,229	32.13%	364	2.24%
2016	12,198	71.32%	3,904	22.83%	1,002	5.86%
2020	14,195	73.87%	4,660	24.25%	362	1.88%
2024	14,209	74.82%	4,462	23.49%	321	1.69%

== Education ==
=== School districts ===
- Central Noble Community School Corporation
- East Noble School Corporation
- Smith–Green Community Schools
- West Noble School Corporation

== See also ==
- National Register of Historic Places listings in Noble County, Indiana
- The News Sun, daily newspaper covering Noble County
