= Wayne Township, Noble County, Indiana =

Wayne Township
- Township
- Coordinates: 41°28′47″N 85°15′20″W
- Country: United States
- State: Indiana
- County: Noble

Government
  - Type: Indiana township

Area
  - Total: 36.37 sq mi (94.2 km^{2})
  - Land: 35.46 sq mi (91.8 km^{2})
  - Water: 0.91 sq mi (2.4 km^{2})
- Elevation: 980 ft (300 m)

Population (2020)
  - Total: 10,929
  - Density: 289.3/sq mi (111.7/km^{2})
- Time zone: UTC-5 (Eastern (EST))
  - Summer (DST): UTC-4 (EDT)
- Area code: 260
- FIPS code: 18-81836
- GNIS feature ID: 454037

Wayne Township is one of thirteen townships in Noble County, Indiana. As of the 2020 census, its population was 10,929 (up from 10,260 at 2010) and it contained 4,704 housing units.

== Geography ==
According to the 2010 census, the township has a total area of 36.37 square miles (94.2 km^{2}), of which 35.46 square miles (91.8 km^{2}) (or 97.50%) is land and 0.91 square miles (2.4 km^{2}) (or 2.50%) is water. Sand Hill, the second highest named point in Indiana, is located in northeastern Wayne Township, near the intersection of county roads 1000E and 1100N.

=== Cities and towns ===
- Kendallville (north side)

=== Unincorporated towns ===
- Wakeville Village at 41.4631053°N 85.2569196°W
- Wayne Center at 41.4817166°N 85.2508083°W

(This list is based on USGS data and may include former settlements.)

=== Major highways ===
- U.S. Route 6
- Indiana State Road 3

== Education ==
Wayne Township residents may obtain a free library card from the Kendallville Public Library in Kendallville.
