= Jefferson Township, Noble County, Indiana =

Jefferson Township
- Township
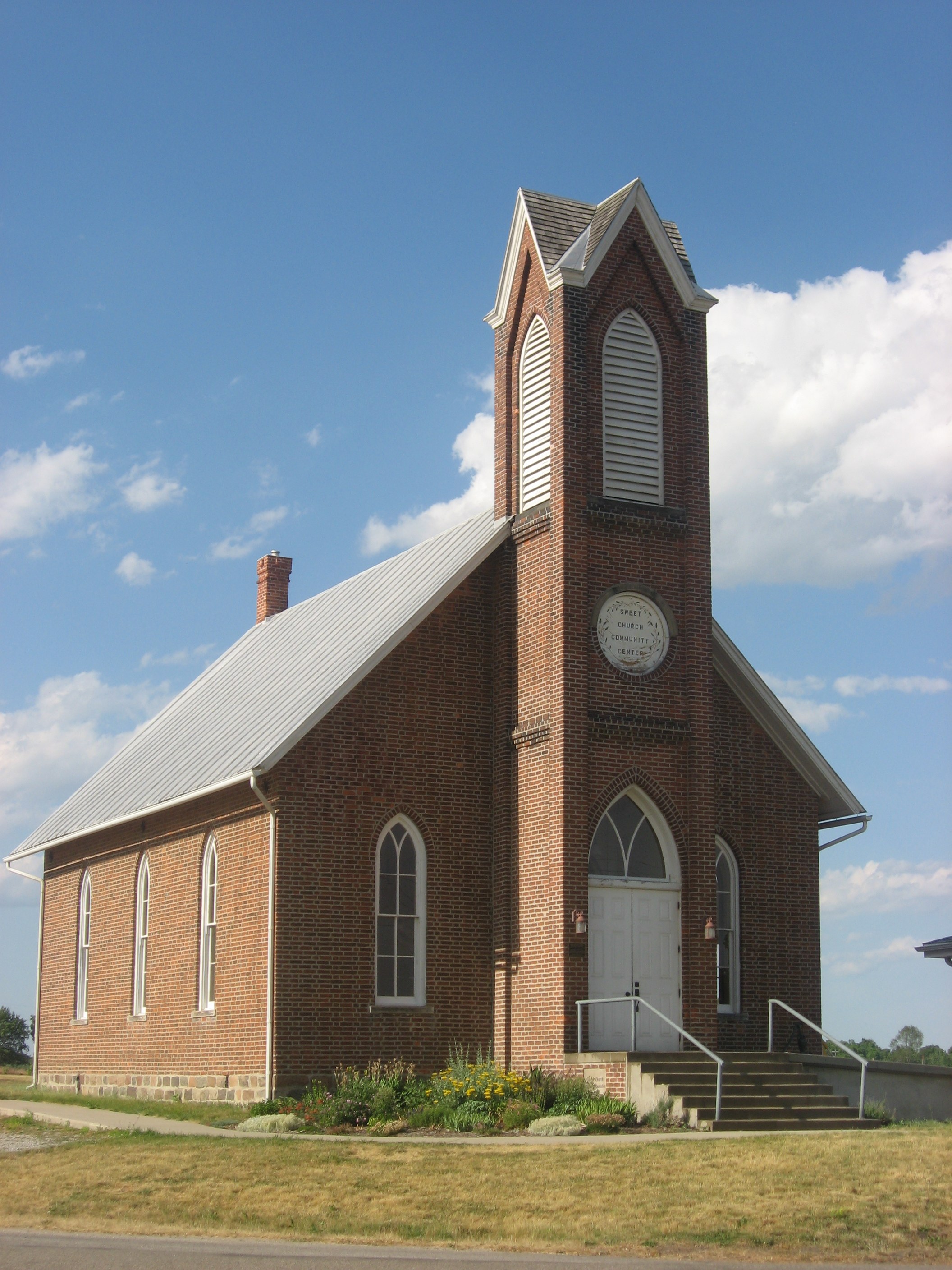
- Jefferson Union Church, a historic site in the township

- Location in Noble County
- Coordinates: 41°23′56″N 85°21′41″W
- Country: United States
- State: Indiana
- County: Noble

Government
  - Type: Indiana township

Area
  - Total: 33.67 sq mi (87.2 km^{2})
  - Land: 33.37 sq mi (86.4 km^{2})
  - Water: 0.3 sq mi (0.78 km^{2}) 0.89%
- Elevation: 942 ft (287 m)

Population (2020)
  - Total: 1,551
  - Density: 48.1/sq mi (18.6/km^{2})
- Time zone: UTC-5 (Eastern (EST))
  - Summer (DST): UTC-4 (EDT)
- ZIP codes: 46701, 46710, 46755
- Area code: 260
- GNIS feature ID: 453493

Jefferson Township is one of thirteen townships in Noble County, Indiana, United States. As of the 2020 census, its population was 1,551 (down from 1,604 at 2010) and it contained 653 housing units.

== Geography ==
According to the 2010 census, the township has a total area of 33.67 square miles (87.2 km^{2}), of which 33.37 square miles (86.4 km^{2}) (or 99.11%) is land and 0.3 square miles (0.78 km^{2}) (or 0.89%) is water.

=== Cities, towns, villages ===
- Albion (east edge)

=== Unincorporated towns ===
- Bakertown at 41.366438°N 85.3572°W

(This list is based on USGS data and may include former settlements.)

=== Lakes ===
- Bushong Lake
- Indian Lake
- Schauweker Lake
- Skinner Lake
- Sweet Lake

== School districts ==
- Central Noble Community School Corporation

== Political districts ==
- Indiana's 3rd congressional district
- State House District 52
- State Senate District 13
