= Washington Center, Noble County, Indiana =

Washington Center
- Unincorporated community
- Location within Indiana Location within the United States
- Coordinates: 41°19′30″N 85°35′50″W
- Country: United States
- State: Indiana
- County: Noble
- Township: Washington
- Elevation: 925 ft (282 m)
- Time zone: UTC-5 (Eastern (EST))
  - Summer (DST): UTC-4 (EDT)
- ZIP code: 46732
- Area code: 260
- GNIS feature ID: 446710

Washington Center is an unincorporated community in Washington Township, Noble County, in the U.S. state of Indiana.

== Geography ==
Washington Center is located at 41°19′30″N 85°35′50″W.
