= Harry Gandy =

American politician

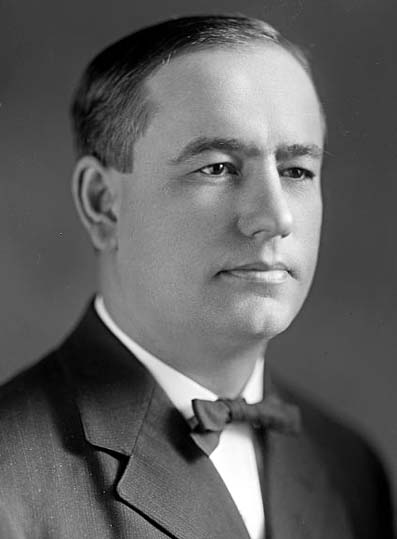

Member of the U.S. House of Representatives from South Dakota's 3rd district
- In office March 4, 1915 – March 3, 1921
- Preceded by: Eben W. Martin
- Succeeded by: William Williamson

Member of the South Dakota Senate
- In office 1911

Personal details
- Born: August 13, 1881 Churubusco, Indiana, U.S.
- Died: August 15, 1957 Los Gatos, California, U.S.
- Resting place: Mountain View Cemetery, Rapid City, South Dakota, U.S.
- Party: Democratic
- Education: Tri-State College
- Occupation: Newspaper publisher

Harry Luther Gandy (August 13, 1881 – August 15, 1957) was an American newspaperman, rancher, and politician who served three terms as a U.S. representative from South Dakota from 1915 and 1921.

== Early life ==
He was born in Churubusco, Indiana, where he attended Smith Township public schools in Whitley County, Indiana. In 1901, he graduated from Tri-State College in nearby Angola, Indiana.

== Before politics ==
By 1907, Gandy had moved to Rapid City, South Dakota. While in South Dakota, he entered the newspaper business and worked as publisher of the Wasta, South Dakota Gazette from 1910 until 1918. He also owned a working cattle ranch from 1910 until 1945.

== Political career ==
In 1911, Gandy was appointed to South Dakota's State Senate. Two years later, he was appointed by Woodrow Wilson as the receiver of public moneys of the United States land office in Rapid City, a position he held until he was elected to the U.S. House of Representatives. He served as South Dakota's Third District representative from March 4, 1915, to March 3, 1921. He lost his bid for re-election to a fourth term.

== After politics ==
After politics, Gandy took up agricultural pursuits and returned to his Wasta ranch. In 1923, Gandy moved to Washington, D.C., after he was hired as a lobbyist as the executive secretary of the National Coal Association (NCA), a position he held until 1930. Between 1930 and 1937, Gandy worked for NCA member of the Pittston Company.

He left Pittson to become chairman of the Bituminous Coal Producers Board in Cincinnati, Ohio, between 1937 and 1940. He worked his remaining years until retirement in executive advisory roles for the Elk River Coal & Lumber Co. and Buffalo Creek & Gauley Railroad Co. in Widen, West Virginia.

== Death and burial ==
Gandy died on August 15, 1957, while retired in Los Gatos, California. He was interred in Mountain View Cemetery in Rapid City, South Dakota.

U.S. House of Representatives
Preceded by Eben W. Martin	Member of the U.S. House of Representatives from South Dakota's 3rd congressional district March 4, 1915 – March 3, 1921	Succeeded by William Williamson
