= Bakertown, Michigan =

Bertrand, Michigan
- Unincorporated community
- Location within the state of Michigan
- Coordinates: 41°48′21″N 86°23′25″W
- Country: United States
- State: Michigan
- County: Berrien
- Township: Bertrand
- Elevation: 722 ft (220 m)
- Time zone: UTC-5 (Eastern (EST))
  - Summer (DST): UTC-4 (EDT)
- ZIP code(s): 49107
- Area code: 269
- GNIS feature ID: 1618885

Bakertown is an unincorporated community in Bertrand Township within Berrien County in the U.S. state of Michigan.

== History ==
The name, sometimes written "Bakerstown", was after the Baker brother, proprietors of a 19th-century mill.
