= Smith–Green Community Schools =

School district in Indiana

Address
- 222 West Tulley St Churubusco, Indiana, (Whitley County), 46723; United States

District information
- Type: Public School District
- Motto: Superior Schools... In a Supportive Community
- Grades: PK–12
- Established: August 1923
- Superintendent: Paul Voigt
- Business administrator: Susan Loftain
- School board: Jeremy Hart, Board President; Jermiah Johnson, Board Vice-president; Emily Putt, Board Secretary; Kassie Taksey, Board member; Brian Clark, Board member
- Schools: 2
- Budget: $15 Million
- NCES District ID: 1810230

Students and staff
- Enrollment: 1,186 (2020–2021)
- Teachers: 65.12 (on an FTE basis)
- Student–teacher ratio: 16.70
- Athletic conference: Northeast Indiana Conference
- District mascot: Eagles
- Colors: Black and gold

Other information
- Schedule: School hours: Monday–Friday: 7:45 am – 3:30 pm; District office hours: Monday–Friday: 7:30 am – 4:00 pm
- Website: www.sgcs.k12.in.us

Smith–Green Community Schools is a public school district serving the town of Churubusco, Indiana. The name derives from the townships it serves: Smith Township in Whitley County and Green Township in Noble County. It has 1,186 students as of the 2020–2021 school year and includes two schools: Churubusco Elementary School (pre-K to 5th grade) and Churubusco Junior-Senior High School (grades 6–12). The schools are housed in the same complex but administered separately.
