= Bakertown, Indiana =

- Unincorporated community
- Location within Indiana Location within the United States
- Coordinates: 41°21′59″N 85°21′26″W
- Country: United States
- State: Indiana
- County: Noble
- Township: Jefferson
- Elevation: 978 ft (298 m)
- Time zone: UTC-5 (Eastern (EST))
  - Summer (DST): UTC-4 (EDT)
- ZIP code: 46701
- Area code: 260
- GNIS feature ID: 430440

Bakertown is an unincorporated community in Jefferson Township, Noble County, in the U.S. state of Indiana.

== Geography ==
Bakertown is located at 41°21′59″N 85°21′26″W.

== History ==
The population was 11 in 1920.
