= LaOtto, Indiana =

- Unincorporated community and Census designated place
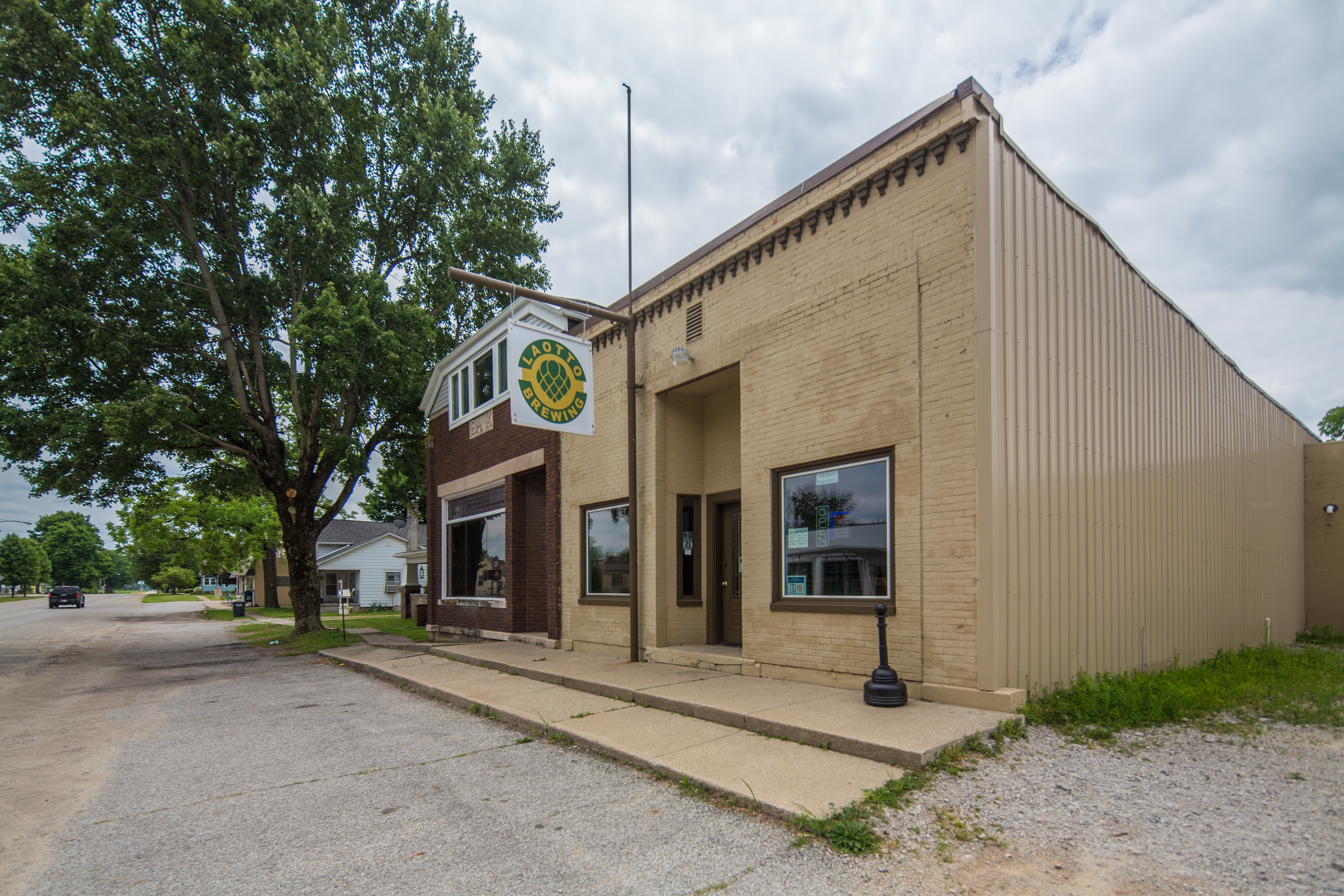

- Location within Indiana Location within the United States
- Coordinates: 41°17′28″N 85°11′56″W
- Country: United States
- State: Indiana
- County: Noble
- Township: Swan
- Elevation: 873 ft (266 m)
- Time zone: UTC-5 (Eastern (EST))
  - Summer (DST): UTC-4 (EDT)
- ZIP code: 46763
- Area code: 260
- FIPS code: 18-42138
- GNIS feature ID: 2830481

LaOtto (sometimes also spelled as Laotto) is a small unincorporated community in Swan Township, Noble County, Indiana, in the U.S. state of Indiana. Located west of the current intersection of Indiana State Road 3 and Indiana State Road 205, it is 16 miles north of Fort Wayne and is also in proximity to Kendallville and Auburn. It is therefore considered a bedroom community to these cities.

== History ==
LaOtto was established in the 1830s as settlers headed north out of Fort Wayne, Indiana, along the Mongoquinong Trail, which would later become Lima Plank Road. From 1856 to 1861, LaOtto was called Simon's Corners, a name taken from the local U.S. Post Office (and so named by cabinet maker and first Postmaster John Miller). Simon's Corners became Simonsville. From 1872 to 1875 it was called Grand Rapids Crossing, because it was the intersection of the north-south Grand Rapids & Indiana Railroad and the east-west Eel River Railroad lines and the railroad did not like the name Simonsville. In 1875, the name LaOtto was proposed and petitioned by Lutheran minister Rev. B.F. Shultz and approved by the Noble County commissioners.

Though LaOtto is a small unincorporated community, it played a role in the fight against slavery. LaOtto Wesleyan Church was a stopping point for slaves on the underground railroad during the 1850s and 1860s. Pastor Aaron Worth was a "conductor" on the underground railroad.

Originally having State Road 3 go through its town's limits, in 1990 a bypass and upgrade of State Road 3 was complete, and it now has a path just east of the town's limits.

== Schools ==
LaOtto's children attend schools in the East Noble School Corporation. Elementary (Kindergarten-5th grade) students now attend Avilla Elementary School, in Avilla, Indiana, after LaOtto Elementary School closed in 2008. Middle school (6th-8th grade) students attend East Noble Middle School, in Kendallville, Indiana. High school (9th-12th grade) students attend East Noble High School, also in Kendallville, Indiana.

== Demographics ==
The United States Census Bureau delineated LaOtto as a census designated place in the 2022 American Community Survey.
