= Brimfield, Indiana =

- Unincorporated community
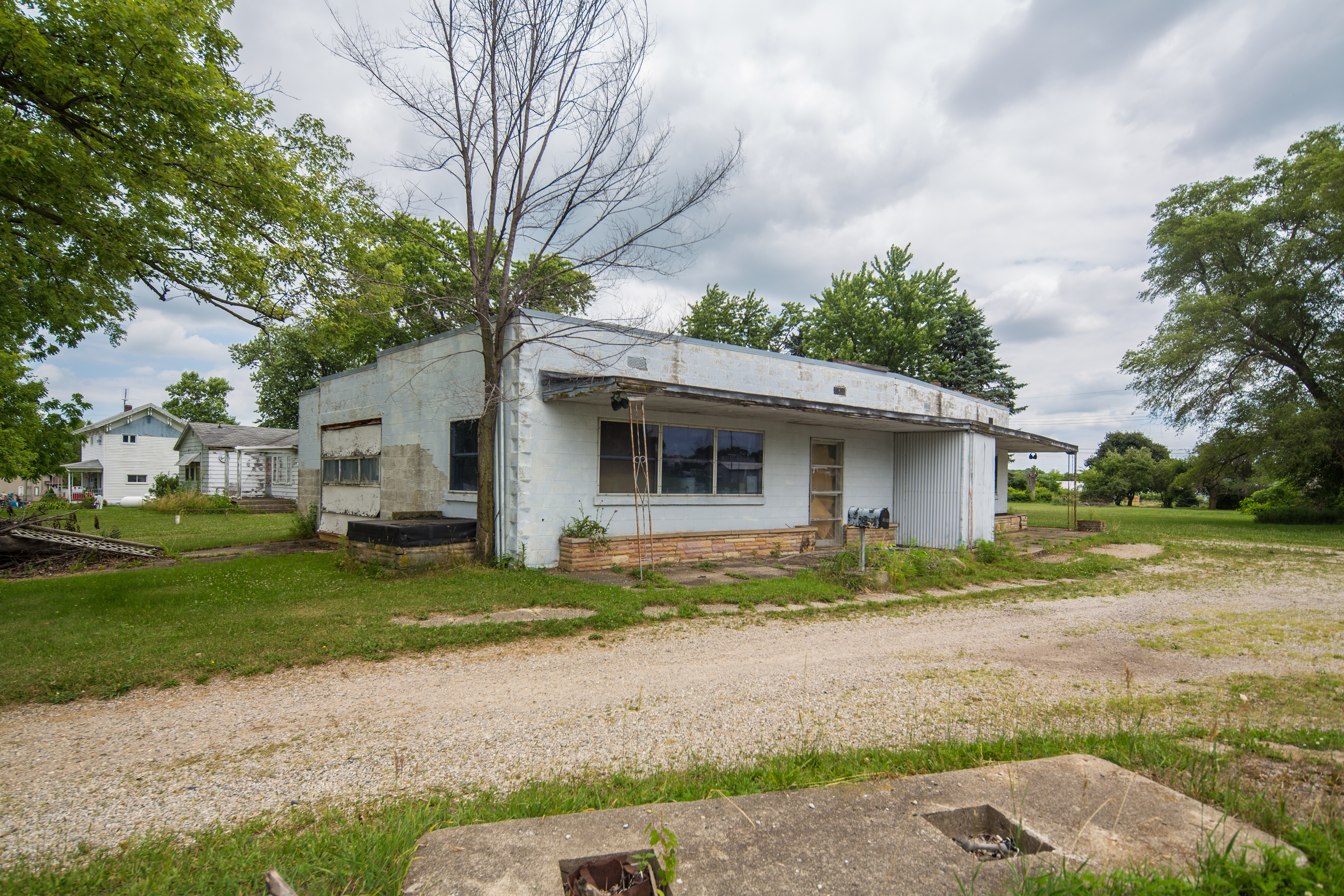

- Location within Indiana Location within the United States
- Coordinates: 41°27′24″N 85°24′06″W
- Country: United States
- State: Indiana
- County: Noble
- Township: Orange
- Elevation: 942 ft (287 m)
- Time zone: UTC-5 (Eastern (EST))
  - Summer (DST): UTC-4 (EDT)
- ZIP code: 46794
- Area code: 260
- FIPS code: 18-7678
- GNIS feature ID: 2830479

Brimfield is an unincorporated community in Orange Township, Noble County, in the U.S. state of Indiana.

== History ==
Brimfield was laid out and platted in 1861. The community was likely named after Brimfield, in England. A post office was established at Brimfield in 1867, and remained in operation until it was discontinued in 1986.

== Demographics ==
The United States Census Bureau delineated Brimfield as a census designated place in the 2022 American Community Survey.
