= Orange Township, Noble County, Indiana =

Orange Township
- Township
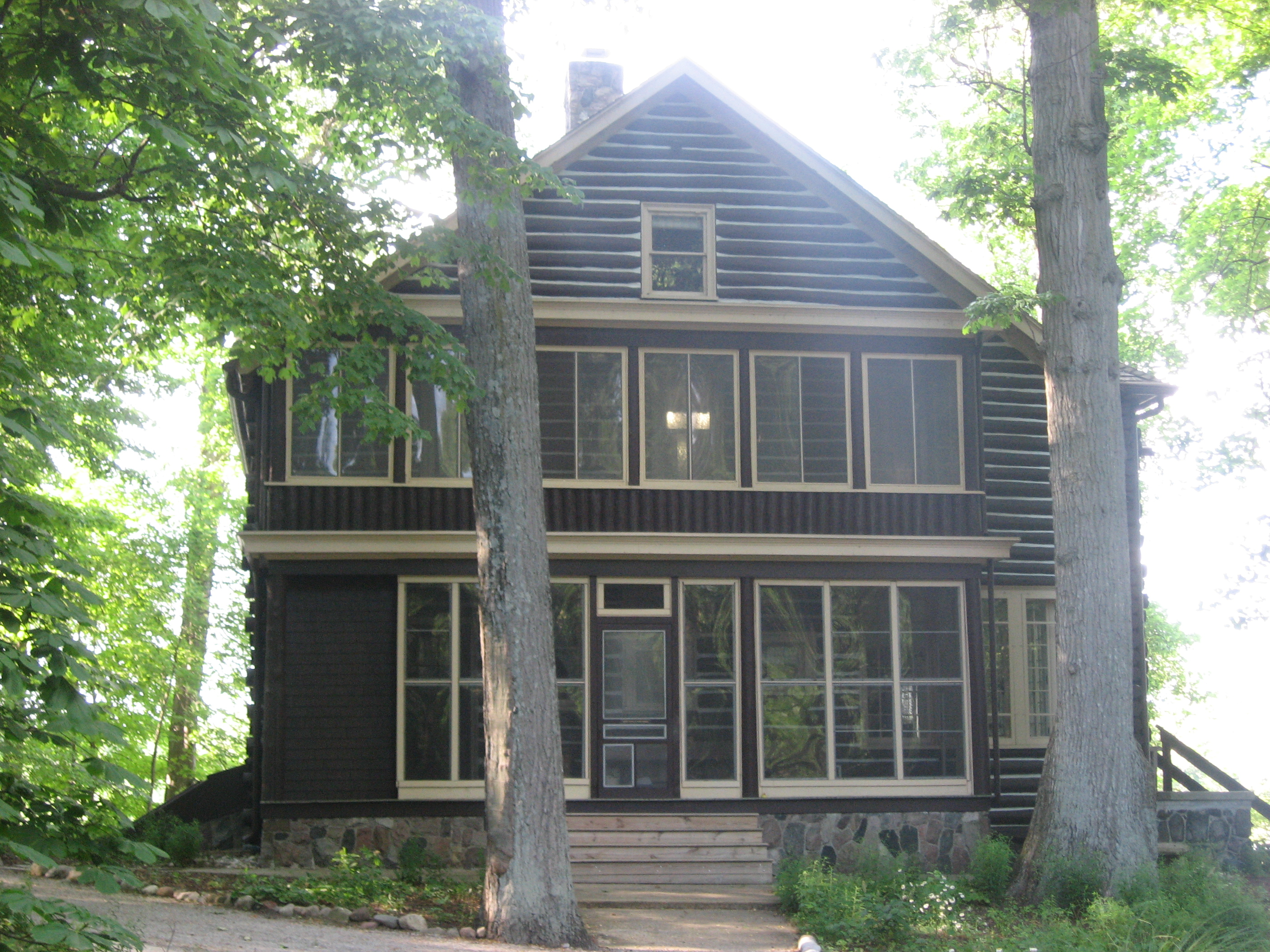
- The "Cabin in Wildflower Woods" at the Gene Stratton-Porter State Historic Site

- Coordinates: 41°28′55″N 85°21′44″W
- Country: United States
- State: Indiana
- County: Noble

Government
  - Type: Indiana township

Area
  - Total: 36.18 sq mi (93.7 km^{2})
  - Land: 34.68 sq mi (89.8 km^{2})
  - Water: 1.5 sq mi (3.9 km^{2})
- Elevation: 948 ft (289 m)

Population (2020)
  - Total: 3,934
  - Density: 112.8/sq mi (43.6/km^{2})
- Time zone: UTC-5 (Eastern (EST))
  - Summer (DST): UTC-4 (EDT)
- Area code: 260
- FIPS code: 18-56754
- GNIS feature ID: 453690

Orange Township is one of thirteen townships in Noble County, Indiana. As of the 2020 census, its population was 3,934 (up from 3,911 at 2010) and it contained 1,994 housing units.

== History ==
Gene Stratton-Porter Cabin (Rome City, Indiana), also known as the Cabin at Wildflower Woods, was the lakeside home of author, nature photographer, naturalist, and silent movie-era producer Gene Stratton-Porter. The cabin was built in 1913 and was added to the National Register of Historic Places in 1974. The historic property, where Stratton-Porter lived until 1919, has been designated as the Gene Stratton-Porter State Historic Site. It is operated by the Indiana State Museum and Historic Sites and open to the public. Scenes from the 1927 movie based on Stratton-Porter's book, The Harvester, were filmed at Wildflower Woods in 1927.

== Geography ==
According to the 2010 census, the township has a total area of 36.18 square miles (93.7 km^{2}), of which 34.68 square miles (89.8 km^{2}) (or 95.85%) is land and 1.5 square miles (3.9 km^{2}) (or 4.15%) is water.

=== Cities and towns ===
- Rome City
- Wolcottville (south side)

=== Unincorporated towns ===
- Brimfield at 41.4542161°N 85.3980348°W

(This list is based on USGS data and may include former settlements.)

== Education ==
Orange Township residents may obtain a free library card from the Kendallville Public Library in Kendallville.
