= Swan Township, Noble County, Indiana =

Swan Township
- Township
- Coordinates: 41°18′18″N 85°14′50″W
- Country: United States
- State: Indiana
- County: Noble

Government
  - Type: Indiana township

Area
  - Total: 36.18 sq mi (93.7 km^{2})
  - Land: 36.15 sq mi (93.6 km^{2})
  - Water: 0.03 sq mi (0.078 km^{2})
- Elevation: 896 ft (273 m)

Population (2020)
  - Total: 2,318
  - Density: 66.4/sq mi (25.6/km^{2})
- Time zone: UTC-5 (Eastern (EST))
  - Summer (DST): UTC-4 (EDT)
- Area code: 260
- FIPS code: 18-74474
- GNIS feature ID: 453888

Swan Township is one of thirteen townships in Noble County, Indiana. As of the 2020 census, its population was 2,318 (down from 2,399 at 2010) and it contained 935 housing units.

== Geography ==
According to the 2010 census, the township has a total area of 36.18 square miles (93.7 km^{2}), of which 36.15 square miles (93.6 km^{2}) (or 99.92%) is land and 0.03 square miles (0.078 km^{2}) (or 0.08%) is water.

=== Unincorporated towns ===
- Ari at 41.2636595°N 85.2494193°W
- Ege at 41.2928262°N 85.2877537°W
- LaOtto at 41.2903266°N 85.1980290°W
- Swan at 41.3158822°N 85.2124738°W

(This list is based on USGS data and may include former settlements.)
