= Wilmot, Indiana =

- Unincorporated community
- Location within Indiana Location within the United States
- Coordinates: 41°18′36″N 85°38′30″W
- Country: United States
- State: Indiana
- County: Noble
- Township: Washington
- Elevation: 892 ft (272 m)
- Time zone: UTC-5 (Eastern (EST))
  - Summer (DST): UTC-4 (EDT)
- ZIP code: 46562
- Area code: 260
- GNIS feature ID: 446117

Wilmot is an unincorporated community in Washington Township, Noble County, in the U.S. state of Indiana.

== History ==
A sawmill was started at Wilmot in 1848. A post office was established at Wilmot in 1850, and remained in operation until it was discontinued in 1911.

== Geography ==
Wilmot is located at 41°18′36″N 85°38′30″W.
