= Avilla, Indiana =

- Town
- Town of Avilla
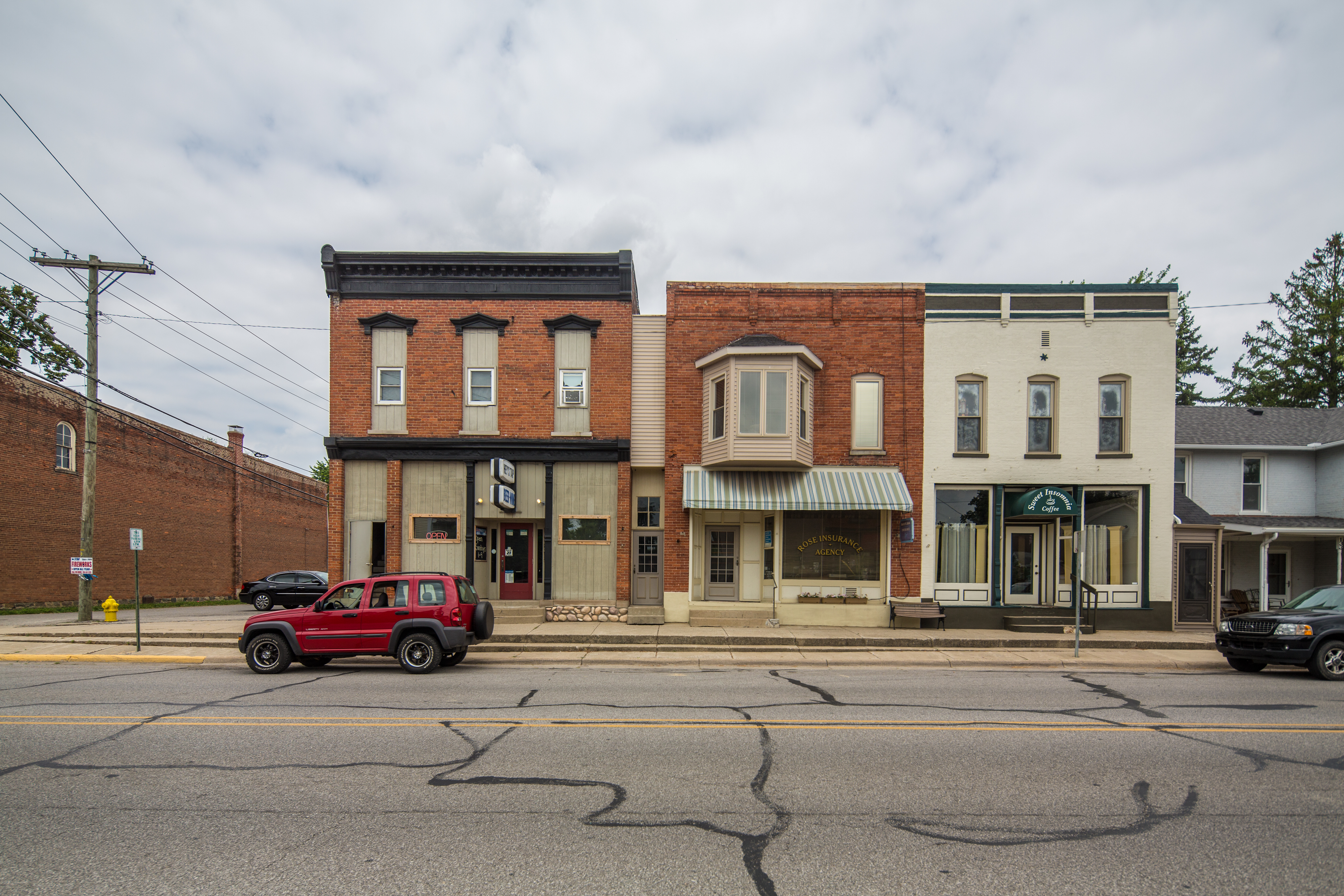
- Downtown Avilla

- Flag Seal

- Location of Avilla in Noble County, Indiana.
- Coordinates: 41°21′50″N 85°14′11″W
- Country: United States
- State: Indiana
- County: Noble
- Township: Allen
- Founded: c. 1835
- Incorporated: 1876

Area
  - Total: 1.71 sq mi (4.42 km^{2})
  - Land: 1.71 sq mi (4.42 km^{2})
  - Water: 0 sq mi (0.00 km^{2})
- Elevation: 958 ft (292 m)

Population (2020)
  - Total: 2,438
  - Density: 1,430/sq mi (551/km^{2})
- Time zone: UTC-5 (Eastern (EST))
  - Summer (DST): UTC-5 (EST)
- ZIP code: 46710
- Area code: 260
- FIPS code: 18-02872
- GNIS ID: 2397446
- Website: avillaindiana.com

Avilla is a town in Allen Township, Noble County, in the U.S. state of Indiana. The population was 2,438 at the 2020 census.

== History ==
A post office has been in operation at Avilla since 1846. According to Ronald L. Baker, the town may be named after Ávila, Spain, but other sources indicated the name was given to represent the French word "villa," meaning a small town.

Avilla was incorporated as a town in 1876.

Among the oldest buildings is the St. James Hotel, which is now the St. James Restaurant.

== Geography ==
According to the 2010 census, Avilla has a total area of 1.48 square miles (3.83 km^{2}), all land.

== Demographics ==
Historical population
Census	Pop.	Note	%±
1870	138		—
1880	446		223.2%
1890	576		29.1%
1900	658		14.2%
1910	579		−12.0%
1920	537		−7.3%
1930	559		4.1%
1940	534		−4.5%
1950	669		25.3%
1960	919		37.4%
1970	881		−4.1%
1980	1,272		44.4%
1990	1,366		7.4%
2000	2,049		50.0%
2010	2,401		17.2%
2020	2,438		1.5%
U.S. Decennial Census

=== 2020 census ===
As of the 2020 census, Avilla had a population of 2,438. The median age was 38.7 years. 23.8% of residents were under the age of 18 and 16.2% of residents were 65 years of age or older. For every 100 females there were 90.2 males, and for every 100 females age 18 and over there were 87.7 males age 18 and over.

0.0% of residents lived in urban areas, while 100.0% lived in rural areas.

There were 1,000 households in Avilla, of which 31.8% had children under the age of 18 living in them. Of all households, 42.0% were married-couple households, 19.8% were households with a male householder and no spouse or partner present, and 27.9% were households with a female householder and no spouse or partner present. About 30.7% of all households were made up of individuals and 11.7% had someone living alone who was 65 years of age or older.

There were 1,049 housing units, of which 4.7% were vacant. The homeowner vacancy rate was 1.5% and the rental vacancy rate was 4.4%.

Racial composition as of the 2020 census
Race	Number	Percent
White	2,259	92.7%
Black or African American	16	0.7%
American Indian and Alaska Native	9	0.4%
Asian	8	0.3%
Native Hawaiian and Other Pacific Islander	0	0.0%
Some other race	37	1.5%
Two or more races	109	4.5%
Hispanic or Latino (of any race)	78	3.2%

=== 2010 census ===
As of the 2010 census, there were 2,401 people, 916 households, and 593 families living in the town. The population density was 1,622.3 inhabitants per square mile (626.4/km^{2}). There were 1,016 housing units at an average density of 686.5 per square mile (265.1/km^{2}). The racial makeup of the town was 98.3% White, 0.7% African American, 0.2% Asian, 0.2% from other races, and 0.6% from two or more races. Hispanic or Latino of any race were 1.5% of the population.

There were 916 households, of which 37.0% had children under the age of 18 living with them, 45.5% were married couples living together, 12.1% had a female householder with no husband present, 7.1% had a male householder with no wife present, and 35.3% were non-families. 30.1% of all households were made up of individuals, and 11.2% had someone living alone who was 65 years of age or older. The average household size was 2.46 and the average family size was 3.04.

The median age in the town was 36.2 years. 27% of residents were under the age of 18; 8.9% were between the ages of 18 and 24; 26.4% were from 25 to 44; 20.4% were from 45 to 64; and 17.3% were 65 years of age or older. The gender makeup of the town was 46.5% male and 53.5% female.

=== 2000 census ===
As of the 2000 census, there were 2,049 people, 780 households, and 520 families living in the town. The population density was 1,499.1 inhabitants per square mile (578.8/km^{2}). There were 818 housing units at an average density of 598.5 per square mile (231.1/km^{2}). The racial makeup of the town was 97.32% White, 0.20% Black, 0.15% Native American, 0.44% Asian, 0.24% from other races, and 1.66% from two or more races. Hispanic or Latino of any race were 1.02% of the population.

There were 780 households, out of which 35.4% had children under the age of 18 living with them, 53.6% were married couples living together, 8.6% had a female householder with no husband present, and 33.3% were non-families. 28.1% of all households were made up of individuals, and 11.0% had someone living alone who was 65 years of age or older. The average household size was 2.45 and the average family size was 2.98.

In the town, the population was spread out, with 26.4% under the age of 18, 8.6% from 18 to 24, 32.2% from 25 to 44, 15.4% from 45 to 64, and 17.5% who were 65 years of age or older. The median age was 33 years. For every 100 females, there were 92.6 males. For every 100 females age 18 and over, there were 88.9 males.

The median income for a household in the town was $42,014, and the median income for a family was $48,800. Males had a median income of $36,773 versus $22,250 for females. The per capita income for the town was $17,591. About 3.0% of families and 5.7% of the population were below the poverty line, including 6.6% of those under the age of 18 and 4.2% of those 65 and older.

== Media ==
Local newspapers in Avilla are Our Hometown News and the News-Sun.

== Education ==
Avilla has a public library, a branch of the Noble County Public Library. It also has Oak Farm Montessori School.
