= National Register of Historic Places listings in Noble County, Indiana =

Location of Noble County in Indiana

This is a list of the National Register of Historic Places listings in Noble County, Indiana.

This is intended to be a complete list of the properties and districts on the National Register of Historic Places in Noble County, Indiana, United States. Latitude and longitude coordinates are provided for many National Register properties and districts; these locations may be seen together in a map.

There are 16 properties and districts listed on the National Register in the county.

Properties and districts located in incorporated areas display the name of the municipality, while properties and districts in unincorporated areas display the name of their civil township. Properties and districts split between multiple jurisdictions display the names of all jurisdictions.

This National Park Service list is complete through NPS recent listings posted April 24, 2026.

== Current listings ==
	Name on the Register	Image	Date listed	Location	City or town	Description
1	Ahavas Shalom Reform Temple	Ahavas Shalom Reform Temple	June 16, 1983 (#83000143)	503 S. Main St. 41°27′42″N 85°35′20″W	Ligonier	
2	Albion Courthouse Square Historic District	Albion Courthouse Square Historic District	December 31, 2013 (#13001014)	Roughly bounded by Highland, Oak, and Hazel Sts., and the alley east of Orange St. 41°23′48″N 85°25′28″W	Albion	
3	Brimfield School No. 2		March 11, 2019 (#100003504)	N 140 E, 1 blk. N. of E. 3rd St. 41°27′23″N 85°23′52″W	Brimfield vicinity	
4	Cromwell Historic District	Cromwell Historic District	September 14, 2015 (#15000597)	Jefferson between 2nd & Orange Sts. 41°24′04″N 85°36′54″W	Cromwell	
5	Iddings-Gilbert-Leader-Anderson Block	Iddings-Gilbert-Leader-Anderson Block	July 21, 1987 (#87000544)	105-113 N. Main St. 41°26′39″N 85°15′58″W	Kendallville	
6	Jefferson Union Church and Sweet Cemetery	Jefferson Union Church and Sweet Cemetery	March 24, 2010 (#10000126)	3015 E415N, east of Albion; 41°24′44″N 85°22′01″W	Jefferson Township	
7	Kendallville Downtown Historic District	Kendallville Downtown Historic District	December 23, 2003 (#03001315)	Roughly bounded by Harris and Rush Sts. and the alleys east and west of Main; 41°26′35″N 85°15′55″W	Kendallville	
8	Kneipp Springs Historic District		March 6, 2018 (#100002183)	2725 and 2730 E. Northport Rd. 41°30′17″N 85°22′20″W	Orange Township	
9	Ligonier Historic District	Ligonier Historic District	October 23, 1987 (#87001798)	Roughly bounded by the former Conrail right-of-way and Smith, Union, College, and Grand Sts. 41°27′46″N 85°35′23″W	Ligonier	
10	Luckey Hospital	Luckey Hospital	March 20, 2013 (#13000090)	Junction of U.S. Route 33 and State Road 109 at Wolf Lake; 41°20′00″N 85°29′39″W	Noble Township	
11	Noble County Courthouse	Noble County Courthouse	May 12, 1981 (#81000005)	Courthouse Square; 41°23′45″N 85°25′28″W	Albion	
12	Noble County Sheriff's House and Jail	Noble County Sheriff's House and Jail	December 27, 1982 (#82000026)	W. Main and Oak Sts. 41°23′44″N 85°25′34″W	Albion	
13	Stanley School-District No. 2	Stanley School-District No. 2	December 16, 2014 (#14001038)	S300E south of Albion; 41°20′17″N 85°21′57″W	Green Township	
14	Gene Stratton-Porter Cabin	Gene Stratton-Porter Cabin	June 27, 1974 (#74000015)	Southeast of Rome City off State Road 9; 41°28′51″N 85°20′55″W	Orange Township	
15	Stone's Trace	Stone's Trace	May 24, 1984 (#84001212)	U.S. Route 33 and State Road 5, south of Ligonier; 41°25′35″N 85°35′10″W	Sparta Township	
16	Jacob Straus House	Jacob Straus House	June 4, 1979 (#79000011)	210 S. Main St. 41°27′50″N 85°35′22″W	Ligonier	

== See also ==
- List of National Historic Landmarks in Indiana
- National Register of Historic Places listings in Indiana
- Listings in neighboring counties: Allen, DeKalb, Elkhart, Kosciusko, LaGrange, Steuben, Whitley
- List of Indiana state historical markers in Noble County
