= List of Indiana state historical markers in Noble County =

Location of Noble County in Indiana

This is a list of the Indiana state historical markers in Noble County.

This is intended to be a complete list of the official state historical markers placed in Noble County, Indiana, United States by the Indiana Historical Bureau. The locations of the historical markers and their latitude and longitude coordinates are included below when available, along with their names, years of placement, and topics as recorded by the Historical Bureau. There are 7 historical markers located in Noble County.

== Historical markers ==
Marker title	Image	Year placed	Location	Topics
Camp Mitchell		1963	Junction of Orchard and Rush Streets in Kendallville; 41°26′28.5″N 85°15′59.4″W	Military
Chief Papakeecha's House one quarter mile south		1967	Junction of County Roads 200N and 1150W, 0.8 miles west of State Road 5 on County Road 200N and 2.4 miles southwest of Cromwell; 41°22′49.8″N 85°38′41″W	American Indian/Native American
Indian Oven 80 rods east		1967	State Road 5 at a public access site entrance to Indian Village Lake at Indian Village; 41°21′51″N 85°38′23″W	American Indian/Native American, Military
Sylvan Lake		1992	State Road 9 at Sycamore Park by the Sylvan Lake dam and outlet site, near Rome City; 41°29′57″N 85°22′32.7″W	Transportation, Business, Industry, and Labor
Noble County Seat/Noble County Courthouse		1999	Courthouse Square in Albion; 41°23′46″N 85°25′28″W	Government Institutions, Buildings and Architecture
Gene Stratton-Porter		2013	1205 Pleasant Point, Rome City	Arts & Culture
Ahavath Sholom		2014	503 S. Main St., Ligonier	

== See also ==
- List of Indiana state historical markers
- National Register of Historic Places listings in Noble County, Indiana
