= Middlebury =

Middlebury may refer to:

In education:

- Middlebury College, a private liberal-arts college in Middlebury, Vermont

Towns:

- Middlebury, Connecticut
- Middlebury, Illinois
- Middlebury, Indiana
- Middlebury, New York
- Middlebury, Ohio
- Middlebury, Vermont
  - Middlebury (CDP), Vermont, the main settlement in the town

Townships:

- Middlebury Township, Elkhart County, Indiana
- Middlebury Township, Michigan
- Middlebury Township, Knox County, Ohio
- Middlebury Township, Pennsylvania

Unincorporated communities

- Middlebury, Wisconsin
