= Benton Township, Elkhart County, Indiana =

Benton Township
- Township
- Location of Benton Township in Elkhart County
- Coordinates: 41°28′55″N 85°42′27″W
- Country: United States
- State: Indiana
- County: Elkhart

Government
  - Type: Indiana township

Area
  - Total: 35.9 sq mi (93 km^{2})
  - Land: 35.84 sq mi (92.8 km^{2})
  - Water: 0.06 sq mi (0.16 km^{2})
- Elevation: 850 ft (260 m)

Population (2020)
  - Total: 3,200
  - Density: 89/sq mi (34/km^{2})
- FIPS code: 18-04798
- GNIS feature ID: 453105

Historical population
Census	Pop.	Note	%±
1930	1,146		—
1940	1,127		−1.7%
1950	1,159		2.8%
1960	1,166		0.6%
1970	1,354		16.1%
1980	1,479		9.2%
1990	1,762		19.1%
2000	2,342		32.9%
2010	2,963		26.5%
2020	3,200		8.0%
U.S. Census:

Benton Township is one of sixteen townships in Elkhart County, Indiana. As of the 2020 census, its population was 3,200, up from 2,963 at the previous census.

According to the 2020 "ACS 5-Year Estimates Data Profiles", 70.1% of the township's population spoke only English, while 23.7 spoke an "other [than Spanish] Indo-European language" (basically Pennsylvania German/German).

== Geography ==
According to the 2010 census, the township has a total area of 35.9 square miles (93 km^{2}), of which 35.84 square miles (92.8 km^{2}) (or 99.83%) is land and 0.06 square miles (0.16 km^{2}) (or 0.17%) is water.

=== Cities and towns ===
- Millersburg (south quarter)

=== Unincorporated towns ===
- Benton

=== Adjacent townships ===
- Clinton Township (north)
- Eden Township, LaGrange County (northeast)
- Perry Township, Noble County (east)
- Sparta Township, Noble County (southeast)
- Turkey Creek Township, Kosciusko County (south)
- Van Buren Township, Kosciusko County (southwest)
- Jackson Township (west)
- Elkhart Township (northwest)

=== Major highways ===
- US 6
- US 33
- SR 13

=== Cemeteries ===
The township contains two cemeteries: Brown and Hire.
