= Ligonier Historic District =

Ligonier Historic District may refer to:

- Ligonier Historic District (Ligonier, Indiana), listed on the National Register of Historic Places in Noble County, Indiana
- Ligonier Historic District (Ligonier, Pennsylvania), listed on the National Register of Historic Places in Westmoreland County, Pennsylvania
