= Middlebury Township =

Middlebury Township may refer to the following places in the United States:

- Middlebury Township, Elkhart County, Indiana
- Middlebury Township, Michigan
- Middlebury Township, Knox County, Ohio
- Middlebury Township, Pennsylvania
