= Bert Inks =

American baseball player (1871–1941)

- Pitcher
- Born: January 27, 1871; Ligonier, Indiana, U.S.
- Died: October 3, 1941 (aged 70); Ligonier, Indiana, U.S.
- Batted: Left Threw: Left

MLB debut
- August 28, 1891, for the Brooklyn Grooms

Last MLB appearance
- June 23, 1896, for the Cincinnati Reds

MLB statistics
- Win–loss record: 27–46
- Earned run average: 5.52
- Strikeouts: 167
- Stats at Baseball Reference

Former teams
- Monmouth Maple Cities (minor league) (1890)

Teams
- Brooklyn Grooms (1891–1892); Washington Senators (1892); Baltimore Orioles (1894); Louisville Colonels (1894–1895); Philadelphia Phillies (1896); Cincinnati Reds (1896)

Albert John Inks (January 27, 1871 – October 3, 1941) was a 19th-century American Major League Baseball pitcher. He grew up in Ligonier, Indiana and pitched at Notre Dame University. He and his brother Will played for Fort Wayne in the Northwestern League. Inks played from 1891 to 1896 for 6 different franchises, all in the National League.

Prior to that, he played in the minor leagues for the Monmouth Maple Cities (Illinois-Iowa League) in 1890.

He built the Crystal Theatre in Ligonier, Indiana.
