= Douglas Rex =

American gastroenterologist

Douglas Rex M.D.
- Education: Harvard College; Indiana University School of Medicine
- Occupations: Physician, Professor of Medicine
- Known for: Research in colonoscopy

Douglas Kevin Rex is an American gastroenterologist who teaches at Indiana University (IU), School of Medicine. He is well known for his prolific publishing in the field of gastroenterology particularly in colonoscopy and colorectal cancer screening and is widely regarded as one of the doctors who established colonoscopy as a safe and effective procedure. He played a key role in Medicare reimbursement for colonoscopy resulting in adoption of the procedure as a colorectal cancer screening tool in the US.

Rex returned to home state Indiana and enrolled at Indiana University School of Medicine in 1976 after graduating from Harvard College, in Cambridge, Massachusetts. He has won many accolades including the Master Endoscopist Award (2003) and Rudolf Schindler award (2013) from ASGE; Berk-Fise clinical achievement award (2011) from ACG. He is a past president and a Master of both the American Society of Gastrointestinal Endoscopy and the American College of Gastroenterology, a Master of the American College of Physicians, and is a Distinguished Professor of medicine at Indiana University since 2009.

== Early life ==
Rex was born in Ligonier, Indiana and attended West Noble High School before going on to Harvard College on a General Motors scholarship.

== Medical career ==
Rex graduated summa cum laude from Harvard and enrolled at Indiana University School of Medicine in 1976. After graduating with the highest distinction from medical school he pursued residency at the same school going on for a fellowship in gastroenterology and chief residency at one of the IU hospitals.

Colonoscopy in the 1980s was still considered unsafe and screening programs were mostly limited to occult blood testing, which although extremely cheap, was not very accurate. Rex conducted the first population based study where he invited about 800 doctors and spouses in Indiana for screening colonoscopy. In addition to confirming the safety of the procedure, high polyp prevalence was noted which was replicated in later studies. More than two-thirds of colorectal cancer burden is the result of slowly progressing pre-cancerous polyps.

Removal of at least larger of these polyps should therefore result in a decrease of colorectal cancer incidence. Colonoscopy screening for colorectal cancer was thus established in the United States.

Rex is a major figure in the technical aspect of colonoscopy and his textbook on the procedure penned with Waye and Williams, remains the authority in that particular field. His most widely cited study is a tandem colonoscopy study in which 183 patients underwent 2 colonoscopies on the same day. The study brought to light that colonoscopy misses a significant percentage of pre-cancerous polyps. Since then Rex has been an international leader in the movement to improve the quality of colonoscopy performance.

In September 2022, Rex joined the medical advisory board of Mainz Biomed N.V., a molecular genetics diagnostic company.
