= Stone's Trace =

Historic house in Indiana, United States

- U.S. National Register of Historic Places
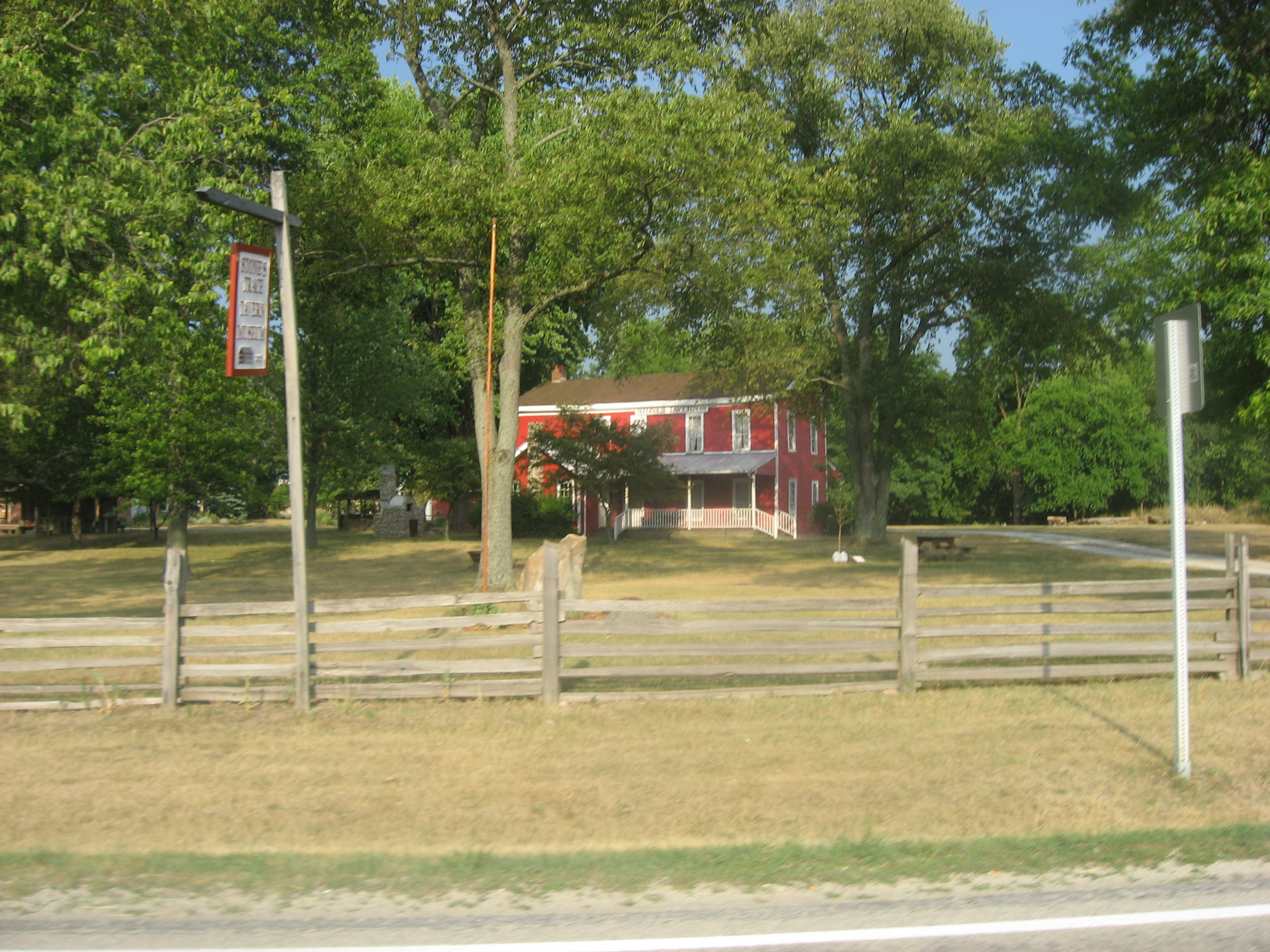
- Tavern at Stone's Trace, July 2012

- Location within Indiana Location within the United States
- Location: U.S. Route 33 and State Road 5, south of Ligonier, Indiana
- Coordinates: 41°25′35″N 85°35′10″W
- Area: 5 acres (2.0 ha)
- Built: 1839, 1875
- Architectural style: Italianate, Federal
- NRHP reference No.: 84001212
- Added to NRHP: May 24, 1984

Stone's Trace is a historic site located in Sparta Township, Noble County, Indiana. The site includes four contributing buildings. Stone's Tavern was built in 1839, and is a two-story, five-bay, Federal style heavy timber frame dwelling. It is sheathed in clapboard and has a side-gable roof. It was moved to its present site about 1860, and restored in 1964–1966. The Cyrus Kimmel house was built in 1875, and is a two-story, L-shaped, Italianate style brick dwelling. Also on the property are the contributing granary and barn. The property is operated by the Stone's Trace Historical Society and Stone's Trace Regulators.

It was listed on the National Register of Historic Places in 1984.
