= Kimmell, Indiana =

- Census-designated place
- Location of Kimmell in Noble County, Indiana.
- Coordinates: 41°23′42″N 85°32′55″W
- Country: United States
- State: Indiana
- County: Noble
- Township: Sparta
- Elevation: 912 ft (278 m)
- Time zone: UTC-5 (Eastern (EST))
  - Summer (DST): UTC-4 (EDT)
- ZIP code: 46760
- Area code: 260
- FIPS code: 18-39744
- GNIS feature ID: 2631624

Kimmell is an unincorporated census-designated place in Sparta Township, Noble County, in the U.S. state of Indiana. As of the 2020 census, Kimmell had a population of 433.

== History ==
Kimmell was founded in 1831, and was named after the Kimmell family of settlers. The post office at Kimmell has been in operation since 1888.
