= Millersburg, Indiana =

- Town
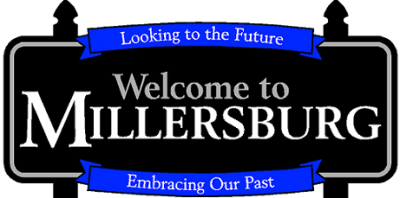
- Logo

- Location of Millersburg in Elkhart County, Indiana.
- Coordinates: 41°31′40″N 85°41′47″W
- Country: United States
- State: Indiana
- County: Elkhart
- Township: Clinton, Benton

Area
  - Total: 0.64 sq mi (1.67 km^{2})
  - Land: 0.64 sq mi (1.67 km^{2})
  - Water: 0 sq mi (0.00 km^{2})
- Elevation: 883 ft (269 m)

Population (2020)
  - Total: 957
  - Density: 1,481.5/sq mi (572.01/km^{2})
- Time zone: UTC-5 (Eastern (EST))
  - Summer (DST): UTC-4 (EDT)
- ZIP code: 46543
- Area code: 574
- FIPS code: 18-49536
- GNIS feature ID: 2396764
- Website: millersburgin.org

Millersburg is a town in Clinton and Benton townships, Elkhart County, Indiana, United States. As of the 2020 census, Millersburg had a population of 957.

== History ==
Millersburg was platted in 1855. It was named for its founder, Solomon Miller.

== Geography ==
According to the 2010 census, Millersburg has a total area of 0.54 square miles (1.40 km^{2}), all land.

== Demographics ==
Historical population
Census	Pop.	Note	%±
1870	52		—
1880	449		763.5%
1890	394		−12.2%
1900	481		22.1%
1910	428		−11.0%
1920	385		−10.0%
1930	344		−10.6%
1940	384		11.6%
1950	437		13.8%
1960	489		11.9%
1970	618		26.4%
1980	809		30.9%
1990	854		5.6%
2000	868		1.6%
2010	903		4.0%
2020	957		6.0%
U.S. Decennial Census

=== 2010 census ===
As of the census of 2010, there were 903 people, 324 households, and 244 families living in the town. The population density was 1,672.2 inhabitants per square mile (645.6/km^{2}). There were 345 housing units at an average density of 638.9 per square mile (246.7/km^{2}). The racial makeup of the town was 97.0% White, 0.6% African American, 0.9% Native American, 1.1% from other races, and 0.4% from two or more races. Hispanic or Latino of any race were 4.4% of the population.

There were 324 households, of which 42.9% had children under the age of 18 living with them, 57.1% were married couples living together, 13.9% had a female householder with no husband present, 4.3% had a male householder with no wife present, and 24.7% were non-families. 18.2% of all households were made up of individuals, and 7.1% had someone living alone who was 65 years of age or older. The average household size was 2.79 and the average family size was 3.22.

The median age in the town was 33.1 years. 30.1% of residents were under the age of 18; 8.6% were between the ages of 18 and 24; 29.8% were from 25 to 44; 22.3% were from 45 to 64; and 9.2% were 65 years of age or older. The gender makeup of the town was 51.1% male and 48.9% female.

=== 2000 census ===
As of the census of 2000, there were 868 people, 310 households, and 249 families living in the town. The population density was 1,646.6 inhabitants per square mile (635.8/km^{2}). There were 324 housing units at an average density of 614.6 per square mile (237.3/km^{2}). The racial makeup of the town was 99.19% White, 0.12% African American, 0.35% from other races, and 0.35% from two or more races. Hispanic or Latino of any race were 1.27% of the population.

There were 310 households, out of which 45.8% had children under the age of 18 living with them, 62.6% were married couples living together, 11.6% had a female householder with no husband present, and 19.4% were non-families. 14.5% of all households were made up of individuals, and 4.8% had someone living alone who was 65 years of age or older. The average household size was 2.80 and the average family size was 3.06.

In the town, the population was spread out, with 33.1% under the age of 18, 7.9% from 18 to 24, 31.0% from 25 to 44, 19.4% from 45 to 64, and 8.6% who were 65 years of age or older. The median age was 30 years. For every 100 females, there were 102.3 males. For every 100 females age 18 and over, there were 102.4 males.

The median income for a household in the town was $43,750, and the median income for a family was $44,250. Males had a median income of $36,083 versus $25,179 for females. The per capita income for the town was $19,700. About 2.7% of families and 4.0% of the population were below the poverty line, including 5.3% of those under age 18 and 5.1% of those age 65 or over.

== School System ==
=== Millersburg Elementary School ===
Millersburg, just like New Paris Elementary, used to be a K-12 school until Fairfield Junior-Senior High School opened up in 1968. Millersburg is a predominantly Amish elementary school. In 1999, a new elementary school was created, it was called, Benton Elementary School, and it would serve rural areas throughout New Paris and Millersburg. In 2008, Fairfield Community Schools had a board meeting upon the issue of the decreasing number of students at Millersburg Elementary, and the rapid growth of Benton Elementary. Fairfield Community Schools ruled that Millersburg would serve a wider area of land to raise the number of students, and keep Benton from overflowing. This eventually fell through and Millersburg got no new students from Benton.
