= Perry Township, Noble County, Indiana =

Perry Township
- Township
- Coordinates: 41°29′04″N 85°35′45″W
- Country: United States
- State: Indiana
- County: Noble

Government
  - Type: Indiana township

Area
  - Total: 35.76 sq mi (92.6 km^{2})
  - Land: 35.68 sq mi (92.4 km^{2})
  - Water: 0.08 sq mi (0.21 km^{2})
- Elevation: 920 ft (280 m)

Population (2020)
  - Total: 6,900
  - Density: 189.5/sq mi (73.2/km^{2})
- Time zone: UTC-5 (Eastern (EST))
  - Summer (DST): UTC-4 (EDT)
- Area code: 260
- FIPS code: 18-59130
- GNIS feature ID: 453724
- Website: perrytownshipnoble.com

Perry Township is one of thirteen townships in Noble County, Indiana. As of the 2020 census, its population was 6,900 (up from 6,761 at 2010) and it contained 2,435 housing units.

== Geography ==
According to the 2010 census, the township has a total area of 35.76 square miles (92.6 km^{2}), of which 35.68 square miles (92.4 km^{2}) (or 99.78%) is land and 0.08 square miles (0.21 km^{2}) (or 0.22%) is water.

=== Cities and towns ===
- Ligonier

=== Unincorporated towns ===
(This list is based on USGS data and may include former settlements.)

== Adjacent townships ==
- Eden Township, LaGrange County (north)
- Clearspring Township, LaGrange County (northeast)
- Elkhart Township, Noble County (east)
- York Township, Noble County (southeast)
- Sparta Township, Noble County (south)
- Turkey Creek Township, Kosciusko County (southwest)
- Jackson Township, Elkhart County (west)
- Clinton Township, Elkhart County (northwest)

== Major highways ==
- U.S. Route 6
- U.S. Route33
- Indiana State Road 5
