= Albion Township, Noble County, Indiana =

Albion Township
- Township
- Location in Noble County
- Coordinates: 41°23′45″N 85°25′29″W
- Country: United States
- State: Indiana
- County: Noble

Government
  - Type: Indiana township

Area
  - Total: 3.92 sq mi (10.2 km^{2})
  - Land: 3.84 sq mi (9.9 km^{2})
  - Water: 0.07 sq mi (0.18 km^{2}) 1.79%
- Elevation: 955 ft (291 m)

Population (2020)
  - Total: 2,326
  - Density: 639.5/sq mi (246.9/km^{2})
- Time zone: UTC-5 (Eastern (EST))
  - Summer (DST): UTC-4 (EDT)
- ZIP code: 46701
- Area code: 260
- GNIS feature ID: 453084

Albion Township is one of thirteen townships in Noble County, Indiana, United States. As of the 2020 census, its population was 2,326 (down from 2,456 at 2010) and it contained 1,012 housing units.

== Geography ==
According to the 2010 census, the township has a total area of 3.92 square miles (10.2 km^{2}), of which 3.84 square miles (9.9 km^{2}) (or 97.96%) is land and 0.07 square miles (0.18 km^{2}) (or 1.79%) is water.

=== Cities, towns, villages ===
- Albion, the county seat (vast majority)

=== Cemeteries ===
The township contains Rose Hill Cemetery.

=== Major highways ===
- Indiana State Road 8
- Indiana State Road 9

=== Lakes ===
- Little Lake

== Climate ==
Climate data for Albion Township, Indiana
Month	Jan	Feb	Mar	Apr	May	Jun	Jul	Aug	Sep	Oct	Nov	Dec	Year
Mean daily maximum °F (°C)	32.2 (0.1)	35.4 (1.9)	45.5 (7.5)	59.0 (15.0)	70.4 (21.3)	80.2 (26.8)	84.3 (29.1)	82.6 (28.1)	76.0 (24.4)	64.3 (17.9)	47.8 (8.8)	35.5 (1.9)	59.4 (15.2)
Mean daily minimum °F (°C)	16.3 (−8.7)	18.4 (−7.6)	26.5 (−3.1)	37.2 (2.9)	47.0 (8.3)	57.3 (14.1)	60.7 (15.9)	58.8 (14.9)	52.4 (11.3)	41.7 (5.4)	30.9 (−0.6)	20.8 (−6.2)	39.0 (3.9)
Average precipitation inches (mm)	1.9 (48)	1.4 (36)	2.3 (58)	3.0 (76)	3.2 (81)	3.7 (94)	3.3 (84)	2.9 (74)	2.9 (74)	2.8 (71)	2.4 (61)	2.1 (53)	31.9 (810)
Source: Weatherbase

== School districts ==
- Central Noble Community School Corporation

== Political districts ==
- Indiana's 3rd congressional district
- State House District 52
- State Senate District 13
