= Clinton Township, Elkhart County, Indiana =

Clinton Township
- Township
- Location of Clinton Township in Elkhart County
- Coordinates: 41°34′05″N 85°42′29″W
- Country: United States
- State: Indiana
- County: Elkhart

Government
  - Type: Indiana township

Area
  - Total: 35.78 sq mi (92.7 km^{2})
  - Land: 35.73 sq mi (92.5 km^{2})
  - Water: 0.06 sq mi (0.16 km^{2})
- Elevation: 915 ft (279 m)

Population (2020)
  - Total: 4,870
  - Density: 136/sq mi (52.6/km^{2})
- FIPS code: 18-13726
- GNIS feature ID: 453231

Clinton Township is one of sixteen townships in Elkhart County, Indiana. As of the 2020 census, its population was 4,870, up from 4,624 at the previous census.

According to the 2020 "ACS 5-Year Estimates Data Profiles", 41.4% of the township's population spoke only English, while 57.2 spoke an "other [than Spanish] Indo-European language" (basically Pennsylvania German/German).

== History ==
Clinton Township was named for the son of a pioneer settler.

== Demographics ==
Historical population
Census	Pop.	Note	%±
2010	4,624		—
2020	4,870		5.3%
U.S. Censuses: 2010, and 2020

== Geography ==
According to the 2010 census, the township has a total area of 35.78 square miles (92.7 km^{2}), of which 35.73 square miles (92.5 km^{2}) (or 99.86%) is land and 0.06 square miles (0.16 km^{2}) (or 0.17%) is water. Fish Lake is in this township.

=== Cities and towns ===
- Millersburg (north three-quarters)

=== Adjacent townships ===
- Middlebury Township (north)
- Newbury Township, LaGrange County (northeast)
- Eden Township, LaGrange County (east)
- Perry Township, Noble County (southeast)
- Benton Township (south)
- Jackson Township (southwest)
- Elkhart Township (west)
- Jefferson Township (northwest)

=== Major highways ===
- SR 4
- SR 13

=== Cemeteries ===
The township contains at least six cemeteries: Clinton Brick Mennonite, Clinton Union, Nisley, Rock Run, Thomas, and Woodlawn
