= Jefferson Township, Elkhart County, Indiana =

Jefferson Township
- Township
- Location of Jefferson Township in Elkhart County
- Coordinates: 41°38′56″N 85°49′40″W
- Country: United States
- State: Indiana
- County: Elkhart

Government
  - Type: Indiana township

Area
  - Total: 35.02 sq mi (90.7 km^{2})
  - Land: 34.88 sq mi (90.3 km^{2})
  - Water: 0.14 sq mi (0.36 km^{2})
- Elevation: 833 ft (254 m)

Population (2020)
  - Total: 10,989
  - Density: 277.7/sq mi (107.2/km^{2})
- FIPS code: 18-37944
- GNIS feature ID: 453483

Jefferson Township is one of sixteen townships in Elkhart County, Indiana. As of the 2010 census, its population was 9,688, up 3,143 from 6,545 in 2000, the largest numeric increase of any of the 16 townships in Elkhart County over that timespan.

== Geography ==
According to the 2010 census, the township has a total area of 35.02 square miles (90.7 km^{2}), of which 34.88 square miles (90.3 km^{2}) (or 99.60%) is land and 0.14 square miles (0.36 km^{2}) (or 0.40%) is water.

=== Adjacent townships ===
- Washington Township (north)
- York Township (northeast)
- Middlebury Township (east)
- Clinton Township (southeast)
- Elkhart Township (south)
- Concord Township (west)

=== Major highways ===
- US 20
- SR 15

=== Cemeteries ===
The township contains four cemeteries: Cornell, Morris, Neff and Pine Creek.
