= Ahavas Shalom Reform Temple =

Historic synagogue in Indiana, United States

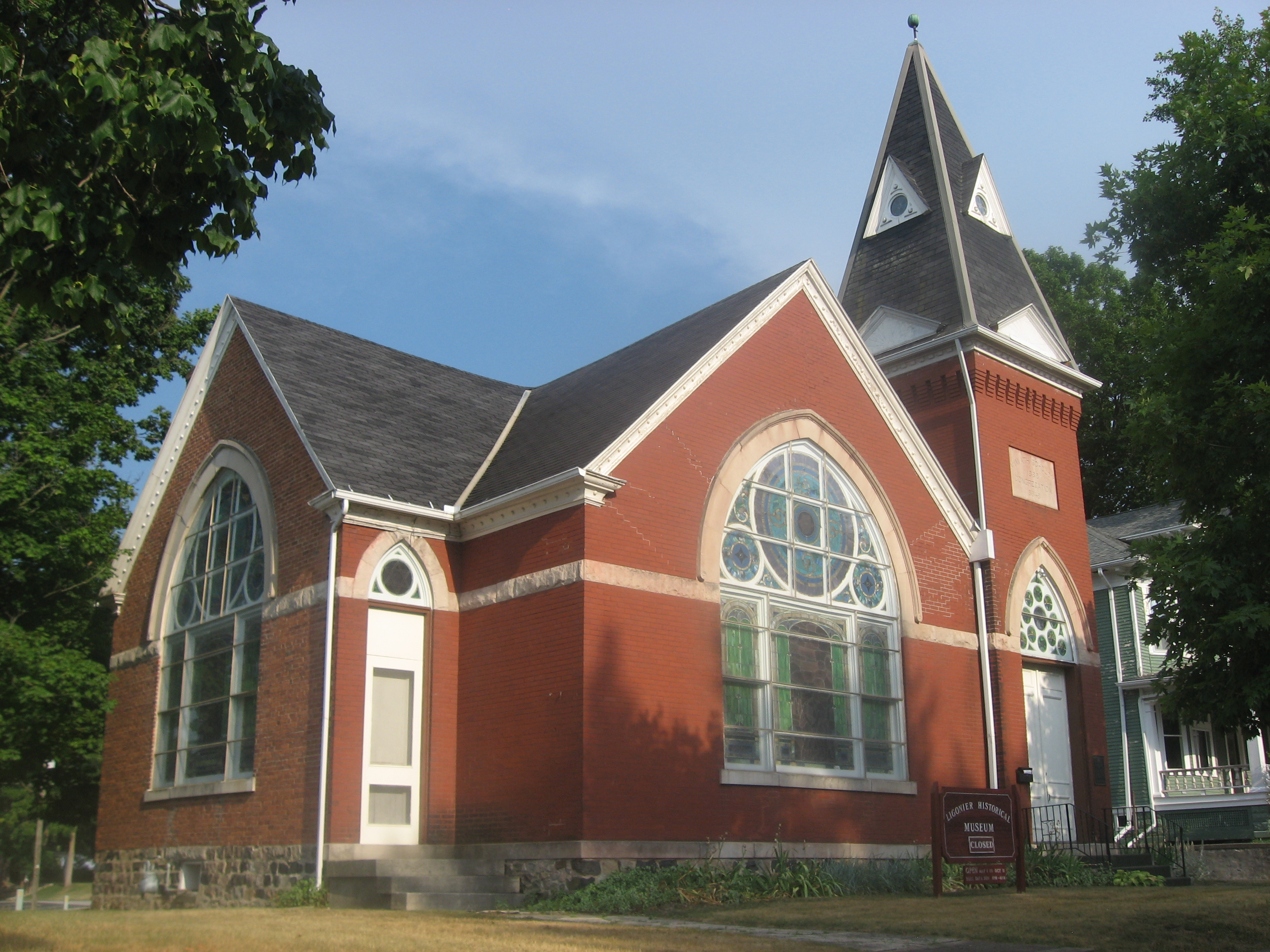
- The former synagogue, as a museum, in 2012

- Location in Indiana

Religion
- Affiliation: Reform Judaism (1889–1954); Methodism (1954–1961); Pentecostalism (1961–1965); Lutheranism (1965–1975); Assemblies of God (1975–c. 1989)
- Ecclesiastical or organizational status: Synagogue (1889–1954); Church (1954–1989); History museum (1989–c. 2015); Private residence (since 2019)
- Status: Closed (as a synagogue); Repurposed

Location
- Location: 503 South Main Street, Ligonier, Indiana
- Country: United States
- Interactive map of Ahavas Shalom Reform Temple
- Coordinates: 41°27′42″N 85°35′20″W

Architecture
- Architect: Harry Matson
- Type: Synagogue
- Style: Gothic Revival; Romanesque Revival
- Established: 1858 (as a congregation)
- Completed: 1889
- Materials: Red brick
- Ahavas Shalom Reform Temple
- U.S. National Register of Historic Places
- U.S. Historic district – Contributing property
- Area: less than one acre
- NRHP reference No.: 83000143
- Added to NRHP: June 16, 1983

Ahavas Shalom Reform Temple (originally, Ahavath Scholom, also Ahavath Sholom, "Lovers of Peace" or "Peace Loving") (Note: In Ashkenazi Hebrew, the letter tav is pronounced s, while it is pronounced t in Sephardi Hebrew and Modern Hebrew. The original Biblical Hebrew pronunciation was ṯ, an aspirant t. The vowel system is also slightly different between traditions. See Hebrew language and Romanization of Hebrew.)) is an historic former Reform Jewish synagogue building located at 503 Main Street, in Ligonier, Noble County, Indiana, in the United States.

Built in 1889, the building was added to the National Register of Historic Places in 1983 as a contributing property within the Ligonier Historic District. The building was variously used as a synagogue, a church, a history museum, and, since 2019, has been used as a private residence.

== Description ==
Ahavas Shalom is a one-story, red brick building with Gothic Revival and Romanesque Revival style design elements. It has a Greek cross plan and is topped by a steep cross-gabled roof. It features an entrance tower topped by a steep pyramidal roof, and lancet windows with stained glass, one of which features an illustration of the story of King David. The building was designed by Harry Matson, a Fort Wayne architect noted for designing several opera houses in Indiana.

The interior of the synagogue contains a vestibule and a large sanctuary, whose floor slopes slightly west to east in the main seating area, which extends north to south across the majority of the sanctuary. On the eastern side there is a bimah, behind which is a projecting brick niche which originally contained the aron kadesh, where torah scrolls were kept. The original ner tomid lamp was removed from its position over the bimah and was given to the Lakeside Congregation for Reform Judaism (now part of Congregation Solel) in Highland Park, Illinois. The original sanctuary pews were updated with more modern pews at some point in the 20th century. (Note: For similar reasons as above, the nomination document uses the near-synonymous dais for the bimah and the variant transcriptions oron kodosh and ner tomid for the aron kadesh and ner tamid as described in their respective Wikipedia articles.)

Stylistically, the temple's architecture is an example of Victorian Gothic design, with significant incorporation of Richardsonian Romanesque styles, such as "deep, closely-spaced corbels beneath the spire", the contrasting polychromy between the red brick walls and stone stringcourse, and alternating rough-faced stone in the stringcourse set against the smooth-faced voussoirs of the window arches.

== History ==
Ahavas Shalom is one of the few surviving 19th-century synagogues in the United States. Jews arrived in Ligonier in the 1850s, meeting in local homes or traveling to Auburn, Indiana for lack of a synagogue in their new town. In 1858 the Ahavas Shalom Congregation was formed, continuing to meet in members' homes, especially those of the Strauss brothers (see below) and that of Joseph Kaufman. A Jewish cemetery was built in 1865, followed by a wooden synagogue building in 1867. This building was replaced by the present brick structure, then transported several blocks and placed next to the brick synagogue to serve as a Hebrew school; it was later demolished sometime in the first half of the 20th century, probably because the shrinking congregation no longer saw a need to repair what was likely by then a deteriorating building. The spot occupied by the old wooden synagogue was later used as the site of a modern prefabricated building.

Rabbi Isaac Meyer Wise attended the dedication of the new synagogue building in 1889. Prominent founders included the Strauss family, who donated one of the windows. The nearby Jacob Straus House, located at 210 South Main Street, has also been added to the National Register of historic places, and is open to visitors. Jacob organized the local school board, which built the town's first public school. Jacob's brother, Frederick Strauss, a wool-stapler, served as mayor of Ligonier, and with his brother, co-founded the Strauss Brothers Bank. The Mier family donated another window; Frederick Mier was also a banker as well as owner of the Mier Carriage Company, which later became an automobile manufacturer, and also served as mayor, while his brother Saul Mier established the city's first water works and sewer system. A ladies' auxiliary provided charity to needy Jews and Gentiles in the community.

At its peak, the congregation contained around sixty families, but as early as 1904 membership had declined to the point that the congregation no longer had a full-time rabbi; instead, a rabbi traveled from South Bend, Indiana for Friday services. In literature for the 1935 Ligonier Centennial, it was recorded that the synagogue's congregation had been meeting only for High Holy Days since 1932.

In 1954, the trustees of the Ahavas Shalom congregation sold the building to a Methodist church, which occupied the building until 1961. The building was next sold to First Christian Church, which occupied the building until 1965, when it was sold to a Lutheran congregation. In 1975, the building was sold to Trinity Assembly of God, which still occupied the structure at the time of its 1983 nomination. Ahavas Shalom was listed on the National Register of Historic Places in 1983. The building was later purchased by the Ligonier Public Library Board of Trustees in 1989, and became the Ligonier Historical Museum, managed by the Ligonier Historical Society. The building was put up for sale by the board in 2015, after it found that it could no longer afford to maintain the building.

While the council searched for a new permanent owner, title was temporarily transferred to Indiana Landmarks to enable the organization to replace the roof to avoid permanent damage to the structure. In 2019, the building was purchased by Indianapolis couple Stacey and Greg Merrell, who converted it to their private home. A preservation easement donated to Indiana Landmarks protects the building's exterior and stained glass windows from modification.

== Gallery ==
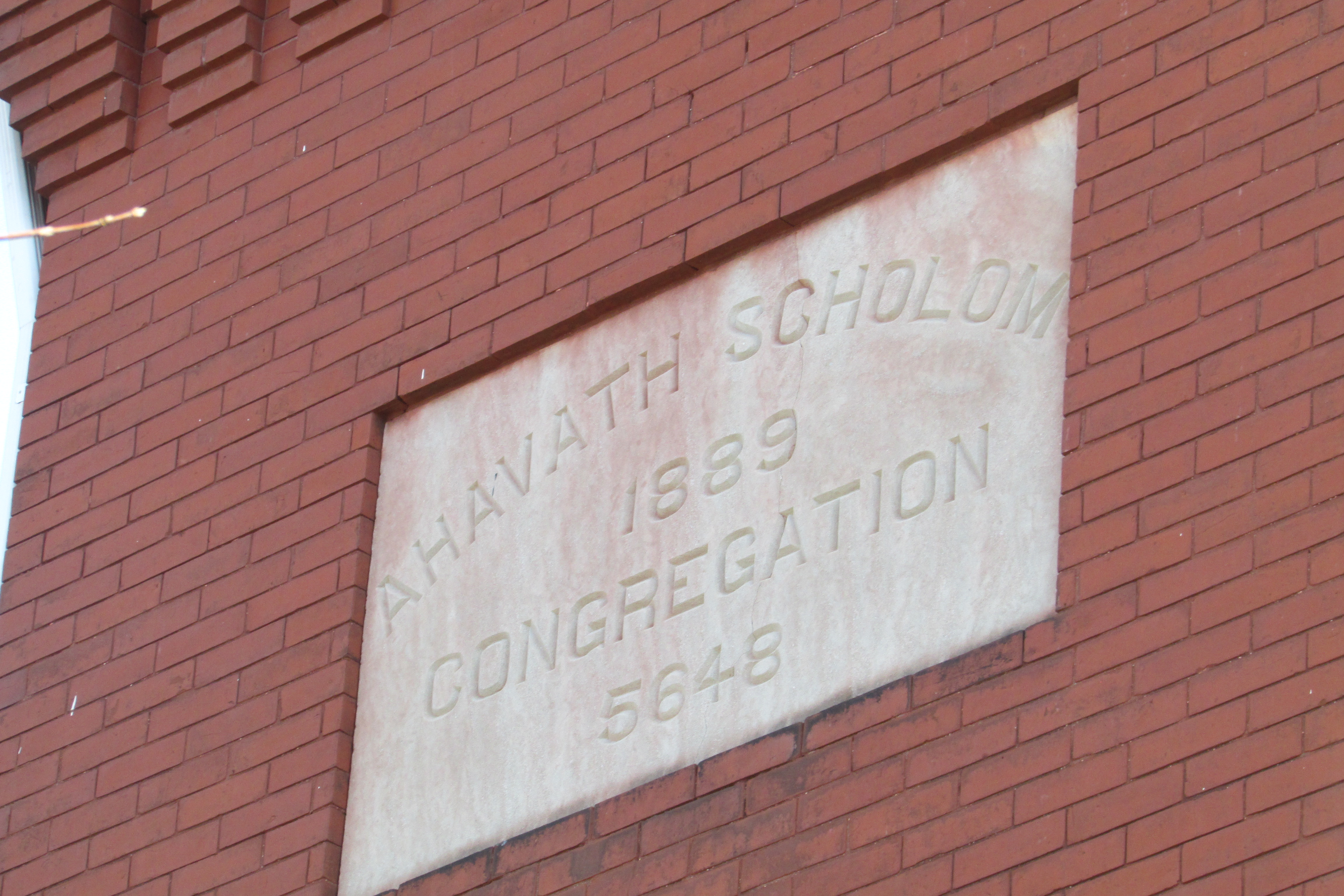
Original dedication plaque showing variant Ashkenazic Hebrew transliteration of congregation name

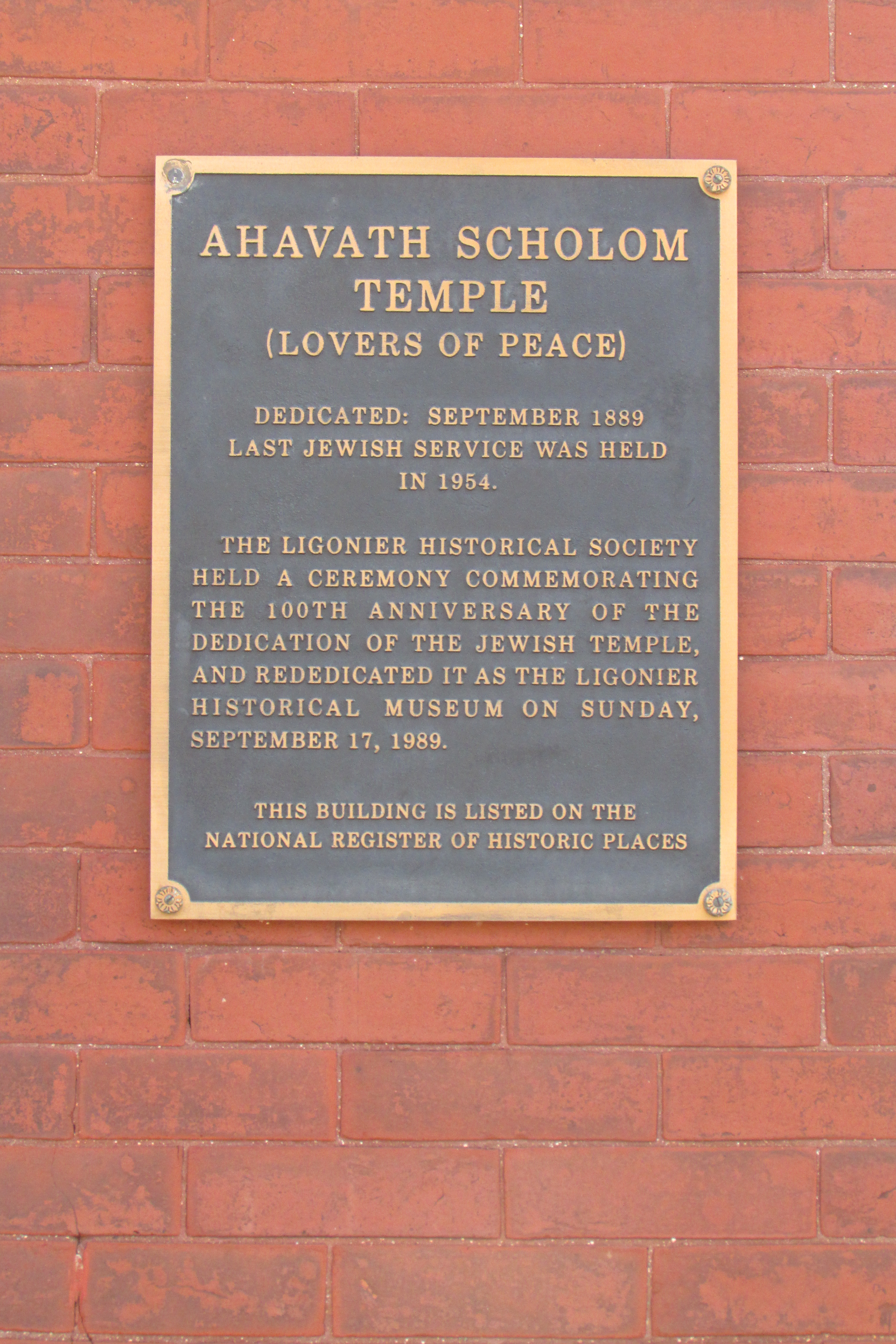
National Register of Historic Places dedication plaque

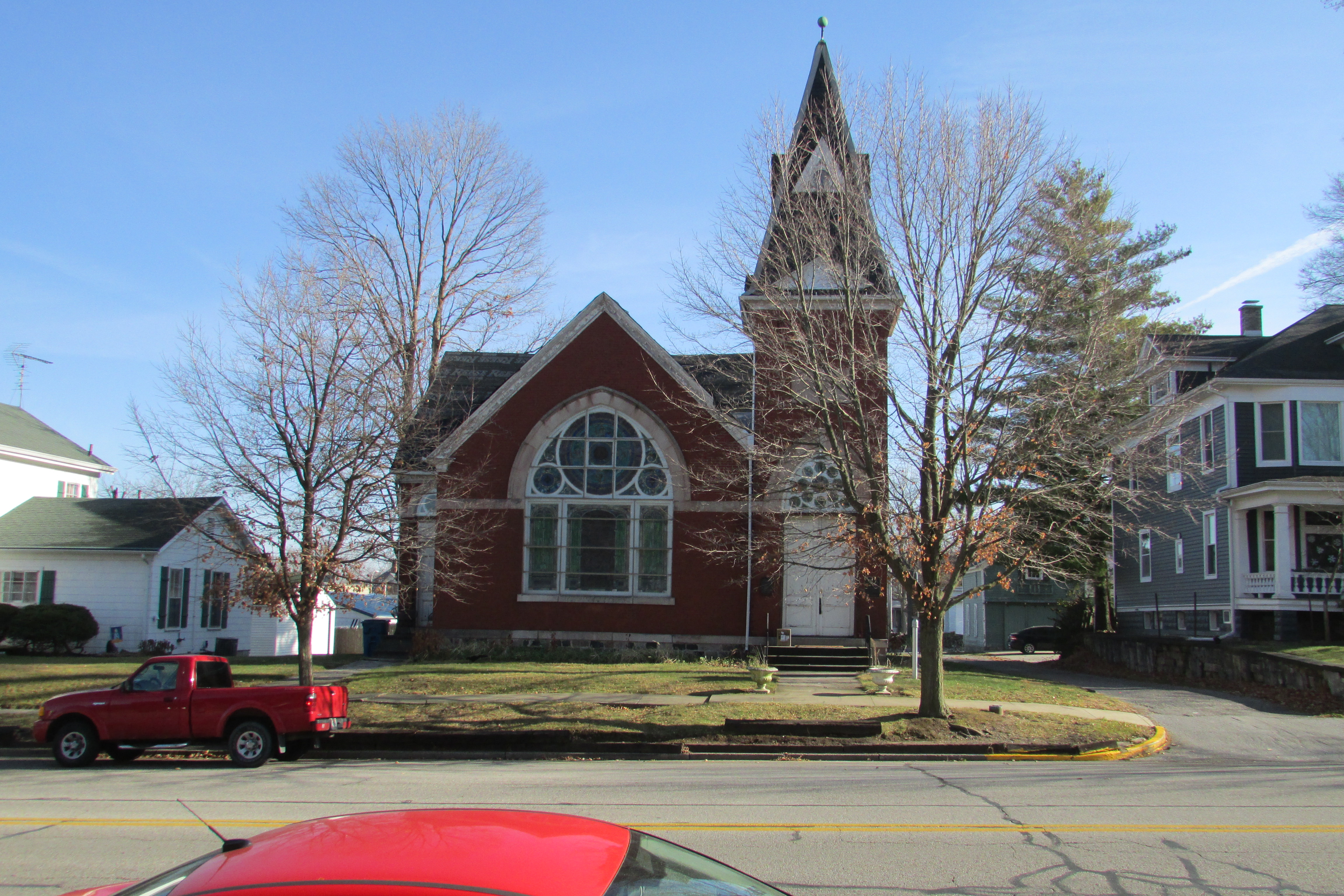
Front view

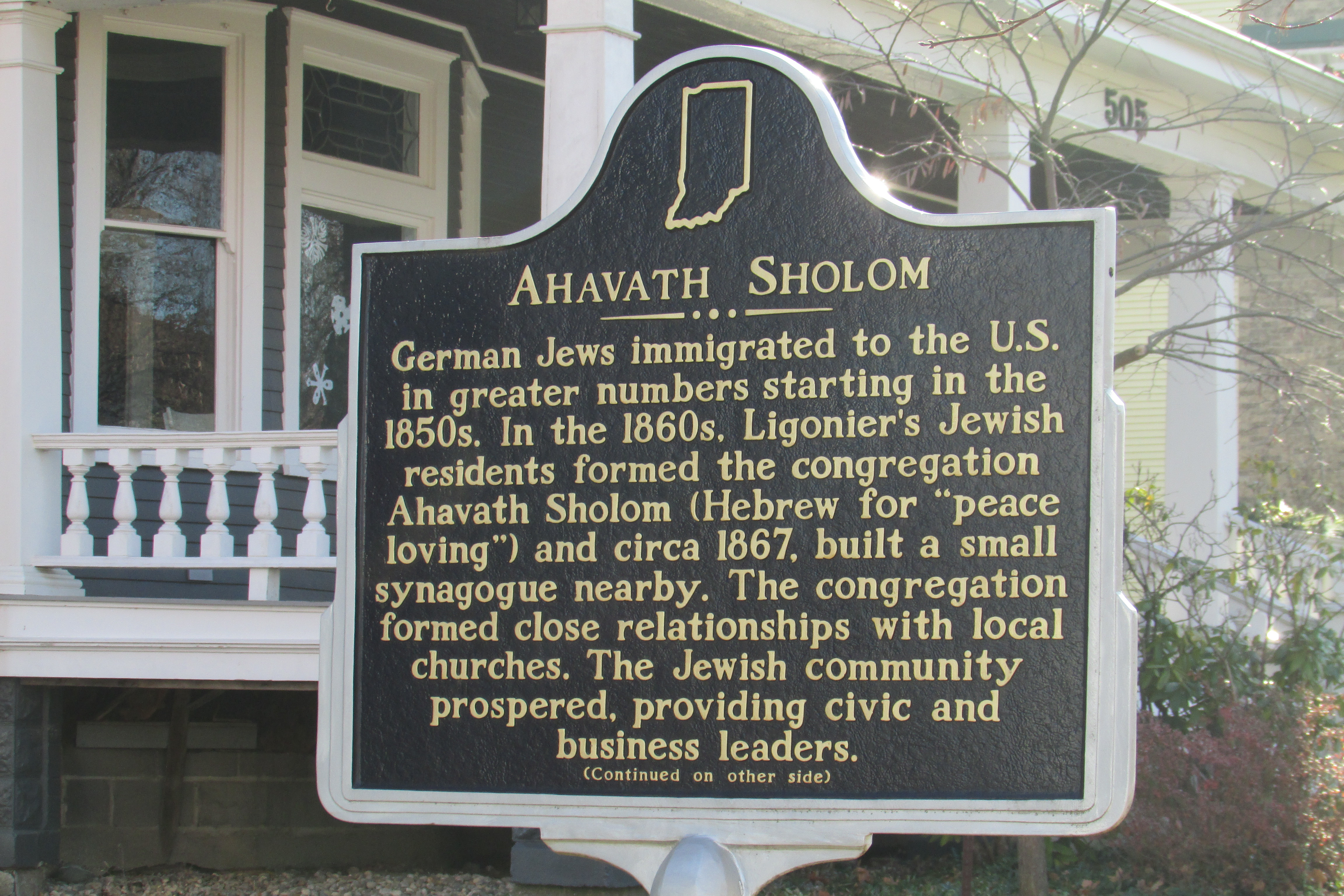
Front side of historic marker

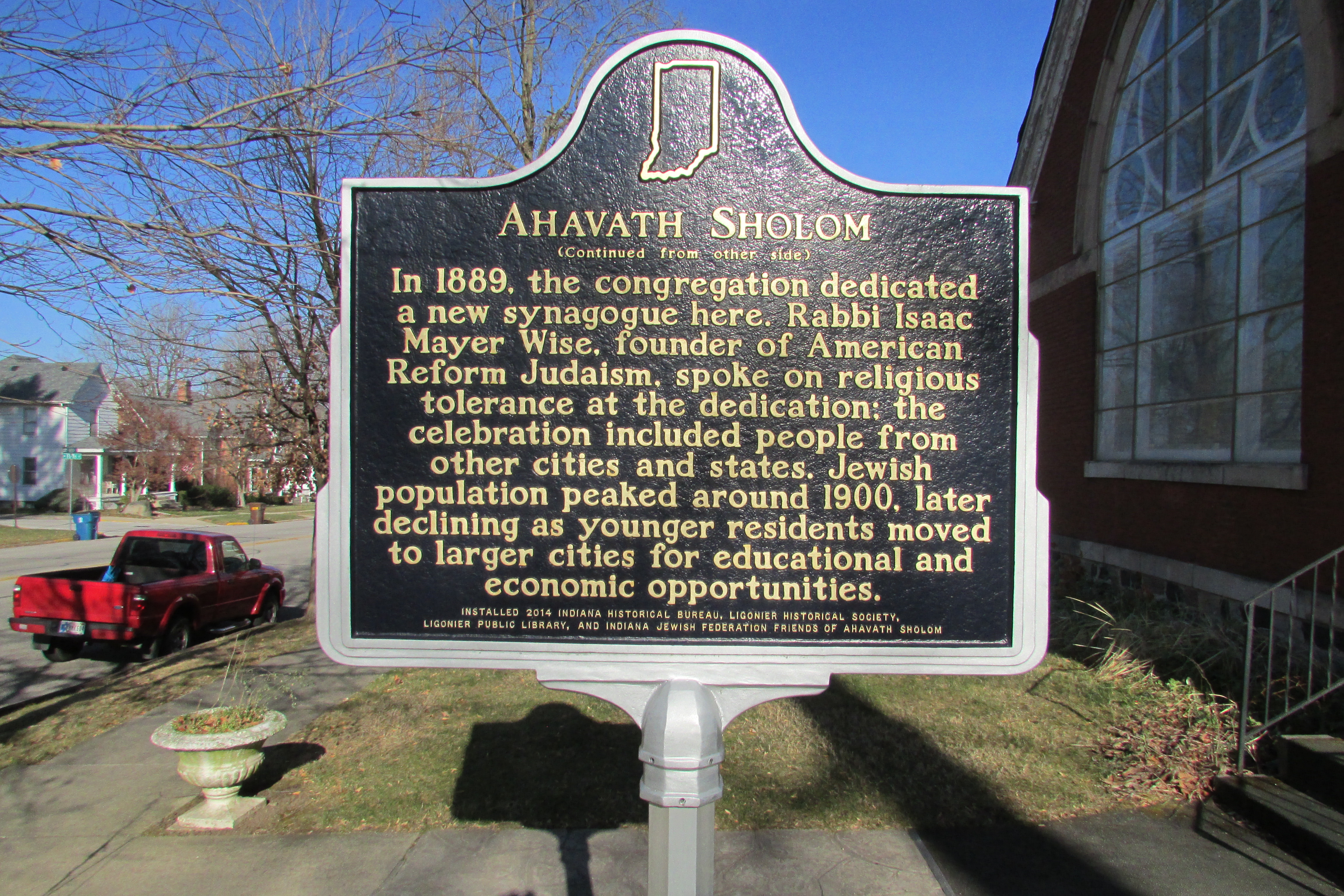
Back side of historic marker
