= Middlebury, Indiana =

- Town
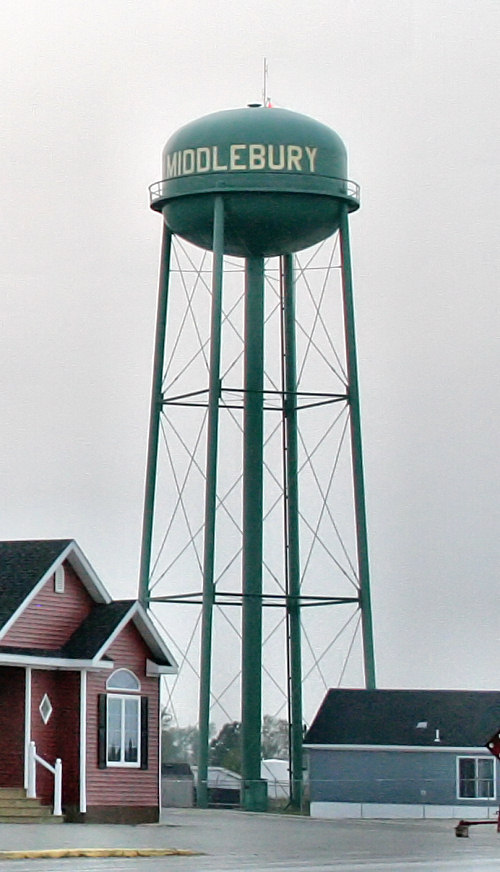
- Middlebury's water tower in 2005.

- Logo

- Location of Middlebury in Elkhart County, Indiana.
- Coordinates: 41°40′10″N 85°42′29″W
- Country: United States
- State: Indiana
- County: Elkhart
- Township: Middlebury

Area
  - Total: 4.35 sq mi (11.27 km^{2})
  - Land: 4.33 sq mi (11.22 km^{2})
  - Water: 0.015 sq mi (0.04 km^{2})
- Elevation: 876 ft (267 m)

Population (2020)
  - Total: 3,466
  - Density: 800.0/sq mi (308.87/km^{2})
- Time zone: UTC-5 (Eastern (EST))
  - Summer (DST): UTC-4 (EDT)
- ZIP code: 46540
- Area code: 574
- FIPS code: 18-48924
- GNIS feature ID: 2396758
- Website: www.middleburyin.com

Middlebury is a town in Middlebury Township, Elkhart County, Indiana, United States. It is located approximately 35 miles east of South Bend, 130 miles east of Chicago, Illinois, and 165 miles north of Indianapolis. Middlebury is nestled in Northern Indiana's Amish country. As of the 2020 census, Middlebury had a population of 3,466.

== Geography ==
Middlebury sits on the banks of the Little Elkhart River in the middle of a mix of rolling hills and rural farm land.

According to the 2010 census, Middlebury has a total area of 3.78 square miles (9.79 km^{2}), of which 3.76 square miles (9.74 km^{2}) (or 99.47%) is land and 0.02 square miles (0.05 km^{2}) (or 0.53%) is water.

== History ==
Before the Europeans came to the region, the Miami and later the Potawatomi ruled the area. That changed in 1832, when the first settlers came from Middlebury, Vermont. They chose this specific area because the rolling hills reminded them of Vermont. Later, in 1841, the first Amish families came from Somerset County, Pennsylvania and settled in the countryside surrounding the town. Middlebury Township was organized in 1834 and the town of Middlebury was finally incorporated in 1868.

In 1888, the railroad came to Middlebury and began to diversify the town's economy to include manufacturing as well as farming.

== Demographics ==
Historical population
Census	Pop.	Note	%±
1880	502		—
1890	542		8.0%
1900	572		5.5%
1910	600		4.9%
1920	599		−0.2%
1930	656		9.5%
1940	722		10.1%
1950	839		16.2%
1960	917		9.3%
1970	1,055		15.0%
1980	1,665		57.8%
1990	2,004		20.4%
2000	2,956		47.5%
2010	3,420		15.7%
2020	3,466		1.3%
U.S. Decennial Census

=== 2020 census ===
As of the 2020 census, Middlebury had a population of 3,466. The median age was 38.6 years. 26.7% of residents were under the age of 18 and 18.3% of residents were 65 years of age or older. For every 100 females there were 93.7 males, and for every 100 females age 18 and over there were 91.4 males age 18 and over.

0.0% of residents lived in urban areas, while 100.0% lived in rural areas.

There were 1,336 households in Middlebury, of which 32.9% had children under the age of 18 living in them. Of all households, 56.7% were married-couple households, 12.2% were households with a male householder and no spouse or partner present, and 25.4% were households with a female householder and no spouse or partner present. About 23.0% of all households were made up of individuals and 12.4% had someone living alone who was 65 years of age or older.

There were 1,406 housing units, of which 5.0% were vacant. The homeowner vacancy rate was 0.8% and the rental vacancy rate was 5.1%.

Racial composition as of the 2020 census
Race	Number	Percent
White	3,127	90.2%
Black or African American	30	0.9%
American Indian and Alaska Native	10	0.3%
Asian	40	1.2%
Native Hawaiian and Other Pacific Islander	3	0.1%
Some other race	59	1.7%
Two or more races	197	5.7%
Hispanic or Latino (of any race)	196	5.7%

=== 2010 census ===
As of the census, of 2010, there were 3,420 people, 1,263 households, and 822 families residing in the town. The population density was 911.1 inhabitants per square mile (351.8/km^{2}). There were 1,341 housing units at an average density of 357.8 per square mile (138.1/km^{2}). The racial makeup of the town was 95.6% White, 0.6% African American, 0.1% Native American, 1.2% Asian, 0.0% Pacific Islander, 1.1% from other races, and 1.5% from two or more races. Hispanic or Latino of any race were 3.2% of the population.

There were 1,263 households, of which 35.9% had children under the age of 18 living with them, 61.3% were married couples living together, 9.9% had a female householder with no husband present, and 24.4% were non-families. 20.7% of all households were made up of individuals, and 11.5% had someone living alone who was 65 years of age or older. The average household size was 2.70 and the average family size was 3.11.

The population was spread out, with 29.0% under the age of 18, 8.0% from 18 to 24, 24.8% from 25 to 44, 24.8% from 45 to 64, and 13.4% who were 65 years of age or older. The median age was 36.7 years. For every 100 females, there were 94.6 males. For every 100 females age 18 and over, there were 91.6 males.

The median income for a household in the town was $54,714, and the median income for a family was $68,273. Males had a median income of $48,894 versus $34,688 for females. The per capita income for the town was $25,825. 2.5% of families and 4.0% of the population were living below the poverty line, including 6.3% under eighteens and 7.1% of those over 65.

== Education ==
The Middlebury Community School system attracts many families to the area. The grade alignment is K–3, 4–5, 6–8, and 9–12. Northridge opened in 1969 and replaced the aging Middlebury and Jefferson Township High Schools. The high school moved into a new building for the 2008–09 school year; the old high school became Northridge Middle School and Heritage Middle School became an intermediate school.

Jefferson Elementary was torn down and replaced in 1998 shortly after Orchard View had opened in 1995.

School	Type	School Corporation	Nickname
Heritage	Intermediate	Middlebury	Knights
Jefferson	Elementary	Middlebury	Tigers
Middlebury	Elementary	Middlebury	Middies
Northridge	High	Middlebury	Raiders
Northridge	Middle	Middlebury	Raiders
Orchard View	Elementary	Middlebury	Eagles
York	Elementary	Middlebury	Mustangs

The town has a free lending library, the Middlebury Community Public Library.

== Economy ==
Middlebury's economy is based on farming, manufacturing, and tourism. A $95,000 earmark was included in the federal FY2009 Omnibus Appropriations Bill to fund "Middlebury Economic Development, IN for development of a comprehensive plan for economic development that takes into account infrastructure needs, land use planning, and downtown redevelopment while balancing the needs of the large Amish population with that of the broader community."

=== Industry ===
Four major manufacturers of recreational vehicles, Grand Design, Winnebago, Jayco and Coachmen RV, have production facilities in Middlebury. Culver Duck Farms, the 2nd largest white pekin duck producer in the United States is located in Middlebury, shipping 70,000+ ducks a week worldwide. Syndicate Systems' largest facility, for the manufacture of retail shelving is also located in town. Middlebury is home to bus manufacturer ARBOC Specialty Vehicles. The Meijer Central Kitchen produces deli salads, deli sandwiches, cookies, and sub buns for the entire Meijer department store chain and is also a distribution center.

=== Tourism ===
Much of Middlebury's tourism revolves around Das Dutchman Essenhaus. The Amish-themed restaurant, inn, conference center, and shops serve over 750,000 people every year. The facility also has a wholesale food operation on site which ships various home-made products.

The town is also home to Krider World's Fair Garden and the Pumpkinvine Nature Trail.

== Notable people ==
- Joanna King, member of the Indiana House of Representatives
- Eric Stults, pitcher for the Los Angeles Dodgers
- Justin Yoder, soapbox driver
