= Cromwell Historic District =

Historic district in Indiana, United States

- U.S. National Register of Historic Places
- U.S. Historic district
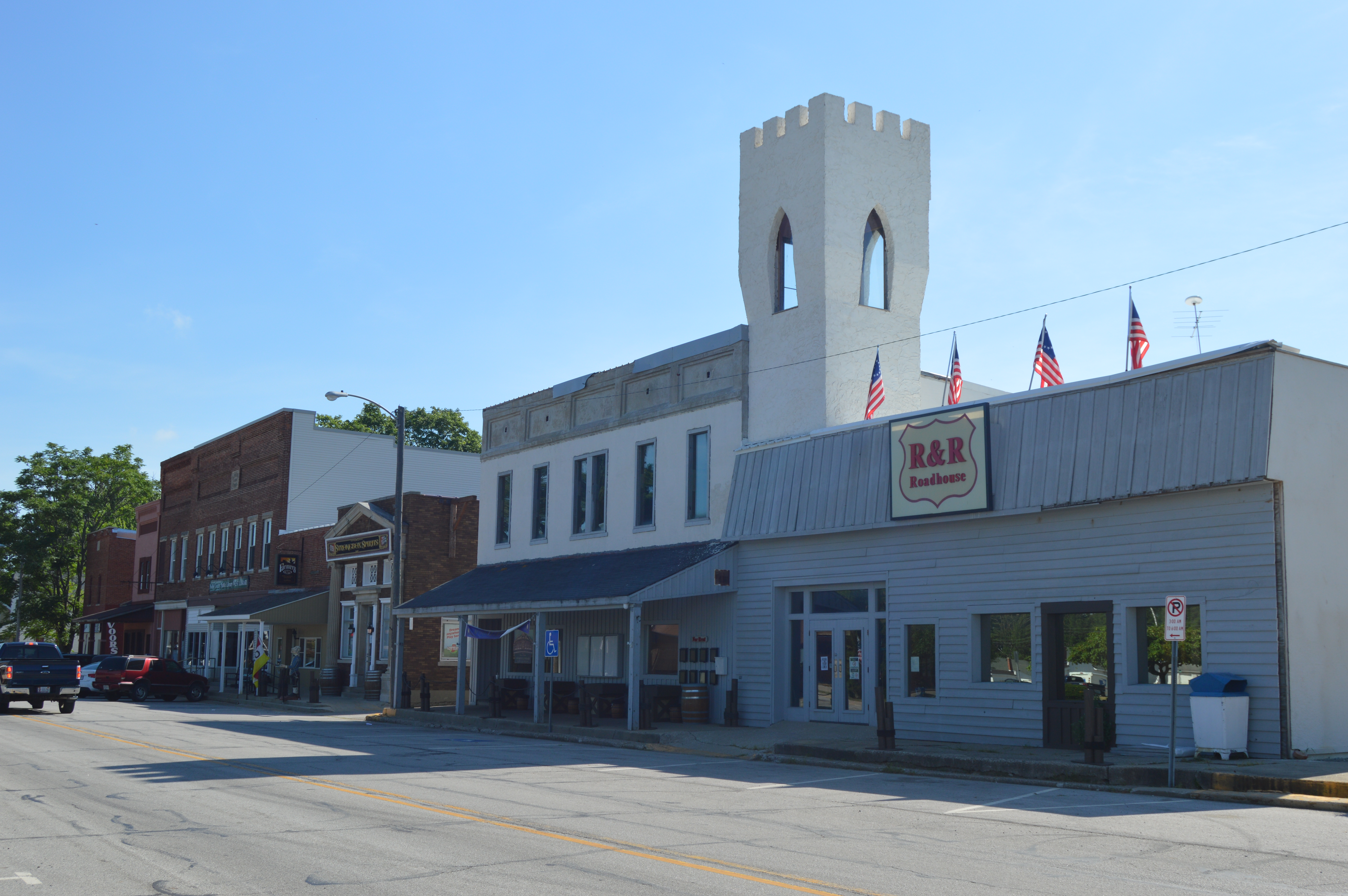
- Jefferson Street north of Orange Street

- Location within Indiana Location within the United States
- Location: Jefferson between 2nd and Orange Sts., Cromwell, Indiana
- Coordinates: 41°24′08″N 85°36′52″W
- Area: 7.25 acres (2.93 ha)
- Built: 1875
- Architectural style: Italianate, Queen Anne, Classical Revival, Tudor Revival, Bungalow/craftsman
- NRHP reference No.: 15000597
- Added to NRHP: September 14, 2015

Cromwell Historic District is a national historic district located at Cromwell, Indiana. The district encompasses 33 contributing buildings in the central business district and surrounding residential sections of Cromwell. It developed between about 1875 and 1953, and includes notable examples of Italianate, Queen Anne, Classical Revival, Tudor Revival, and Bungalow / American Craftsman style architecture. Notable buildings include the Edwin Kline-DeMotte House (c. 1890), Forrest Henney/Henney Funeral Home (1910), Hussey House (1901), Kline Building-Maccabee Hall (c. 1880), Sparta State Bank (c. 1915), Smith's Hall/Knights of Pythias Hall (1910), Pret Lung Meat Market (1917), Calvary Lutheran (Cromwell Evangelical Lutheran) Church (1910), and Biddle's Bakery (1925).

It was listed on the National Register of Historic Places in 2015.
