= Jacob Straus House =

Historic house in Indiana, United States

- U.S. National Register of Historic Places
- U.S. Historic district – Contributing property
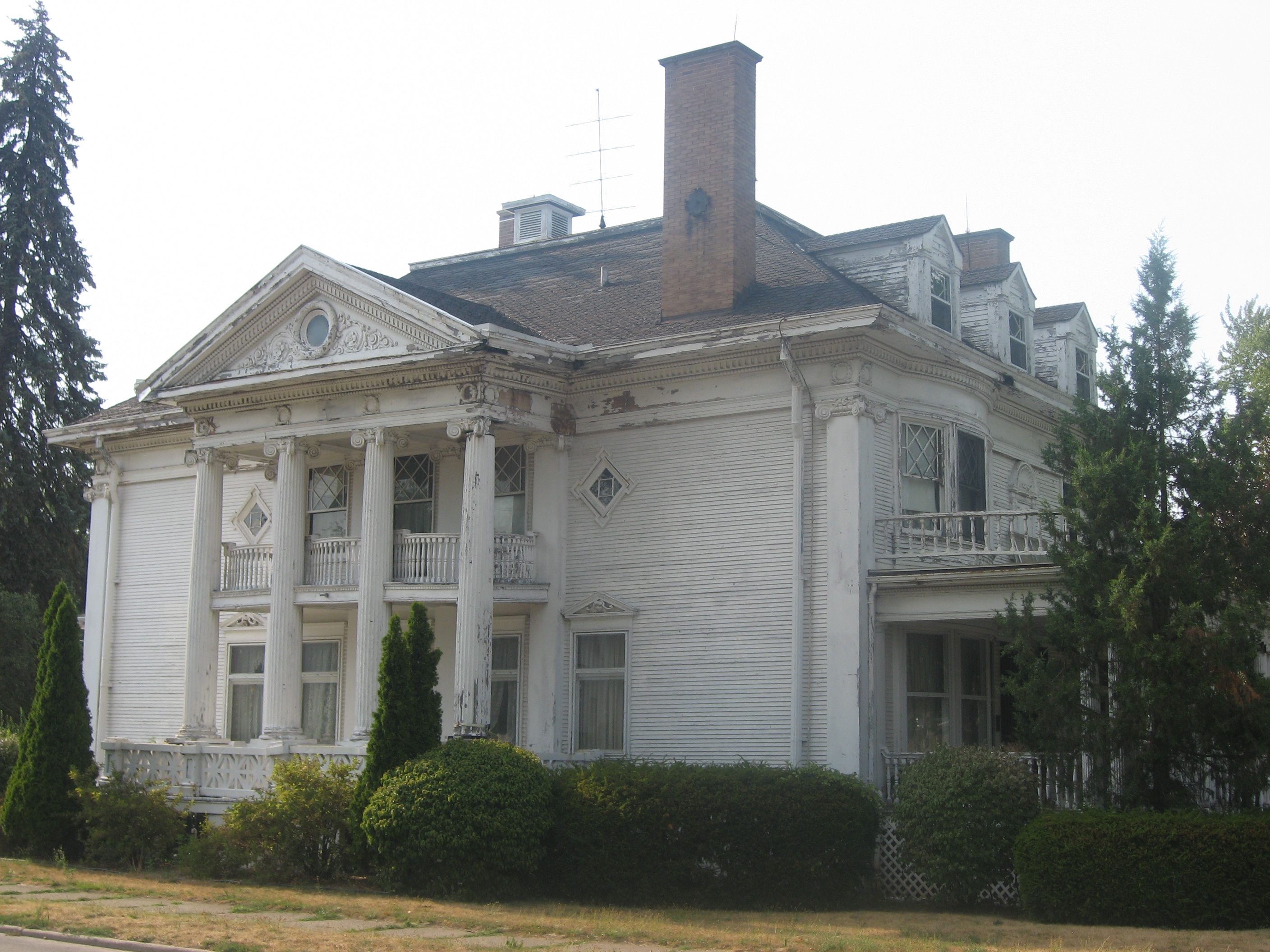
- Jacob Straus House, July 2012

- Location within Indiana Location within the United States
- Location: 210 S. Main St., Ligonier, Indiana
- Coordinates: 41°27′51″N 85°35′22″W
- Area: less than one acre
- Built: 1898-1899
- Architect: Ottenheimer, H. L.
- Architectural style: Late 19th And 20th Century Revivals
- NRHP reference No.: 79000011
- Added to NRHP: June 4, 1979

Jacob Straus House, also known as the Louis Levy House, is a historic home located at Ligonier, Indiana. It was built in 1898–1899, and is a two-story, frame dwelling with Neoclassical and Colonial Revival style design elements. It has a truncated hipped roof with dormers. The front facade features a two-story pedimented portico with Ionic order columns and pilasters. Also on the property is a contributing complementary garage. It is open to visitors by the Ligonier Historical Museum.

It was listed on the National Register of Historic Places in 1979. It is located in the Ligonier Historic District.
