= Albion Courthouse Square Historic District =

Historic district in Indiana, United States

- U.S. National Register of Historic Places
- U.S. Historic district
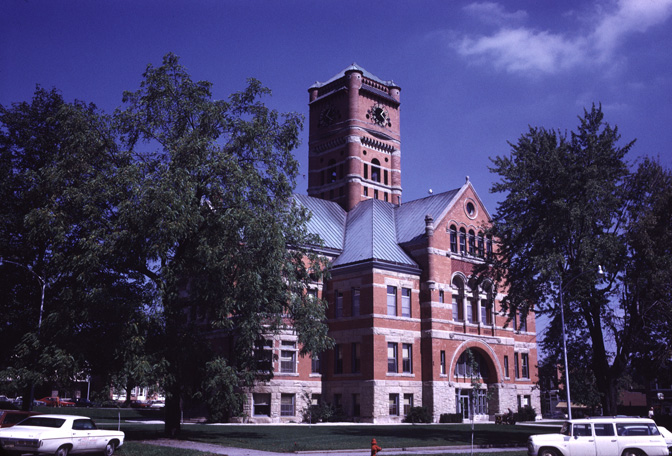
- Noble County Courthouse, October 1970

- Location within Indiana Location within the United States
- Location: Roughly bounded by Highland, Oak, and Hazel Sts., and the alley east of Orange St., Albion, Indiana
- Coordinates: 41°23′48″N 85°25′28″W
- Area: 7.5 acres (3.0 ha)
- Built: 1887
- Built by: Harvey, George and Son; M. J. Malone & Bros.
- Architect: E. O. Fallis & Co.
- Architectural style: Greek Revival, Gothic Revival, Italianate, Romanesque, Classical Revival, Art Deco
- NRHP reference No.: 13001014
- Added to NRHP: December 31, 2013

Albion Courthouse Square Historic District is a national historic district located in Albion, Indiana. The district encompasses 61 contributing buildings, 1 contributing site, and 2 contributing structures in the central business district and surrounding residential sections of Albion. It developed between about 1855 and 1964, and includes notable examples of Greek Revival, Gothic Revival, Italianate, Romanesque Revival, Classical Revival, and Art Deco style architecture. Located in the district are the separately listed Noble County Courthouse and Noble County Sheriff's House and Jail. Other notable buildings include the U.S. Post Office (1964), Police Booth (c. 1955), Albion Town Hall (1930), St. Mark's Lutheran Church (1905), United Brethren Church / Masonic Lodge (1886, 1903), Presbyterian Church (1876, 1951), and Clapp Block / Bank Building (c. 1882, 1925).

It was listed on the National Register of Historic Places in 2013.
