= Noble County Sheriff's House and Jail =

Historic government buildings in Indiana, United States

- U.S. National Register of Historic Places
- U.S. Historic district – Contributing property
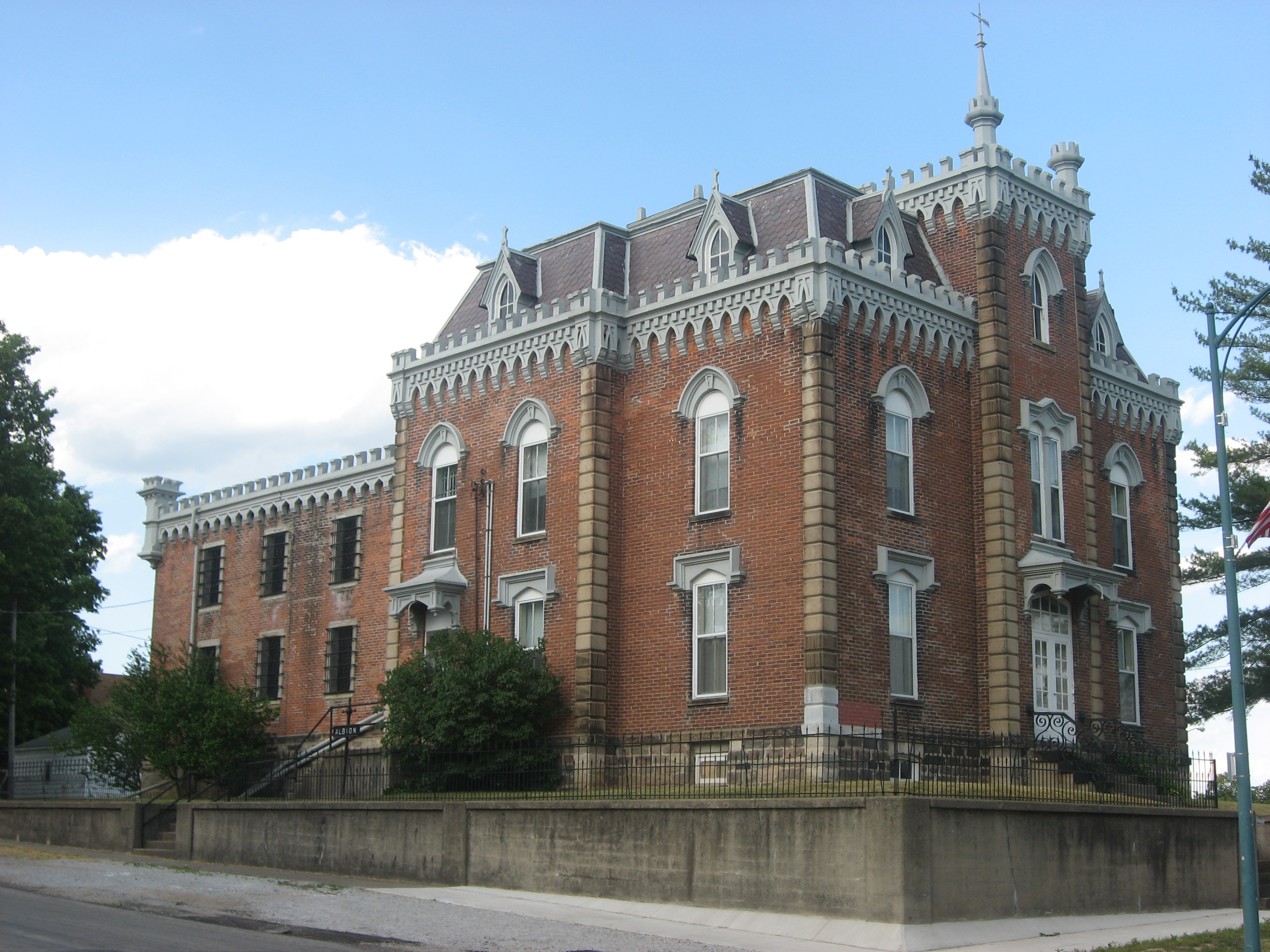
- Front and western side

- Location within Indiana Location within the United States
- Location: W. Main and Oak Sts., Albion, Indiana
- Coordinates: 41°23′44″N 85°25′34″W
- Area: 0.4 acres (0.16 ha)
- Built: 1875
- Architect: Tolan, T. J.
- Architectural style: Second Empire, Gothic, Eclectic
- NRHP reference No.: 82000026
- Added to NRHP: December 27, 1982

The Noble County Sheriff's House and Jail, also known as the Old Jail Museum, is a historic jail and residence located in Albion, Indiana. It was built in 1875 by Thomas J. Tolan and Son, Architects of Fort Wayne, Indiana. It is a 2 1/2-story, red brick building with combined Second Empire and Gothic Revival style design elements. It features round-arched windows, a three-story projecting entrance tower, and a mansard roof.

It was listed on the National Register of Historic Places in 1982. It is located in the Albion Courthouse Square Historic District.
