= Albion, Indiana =

- Town
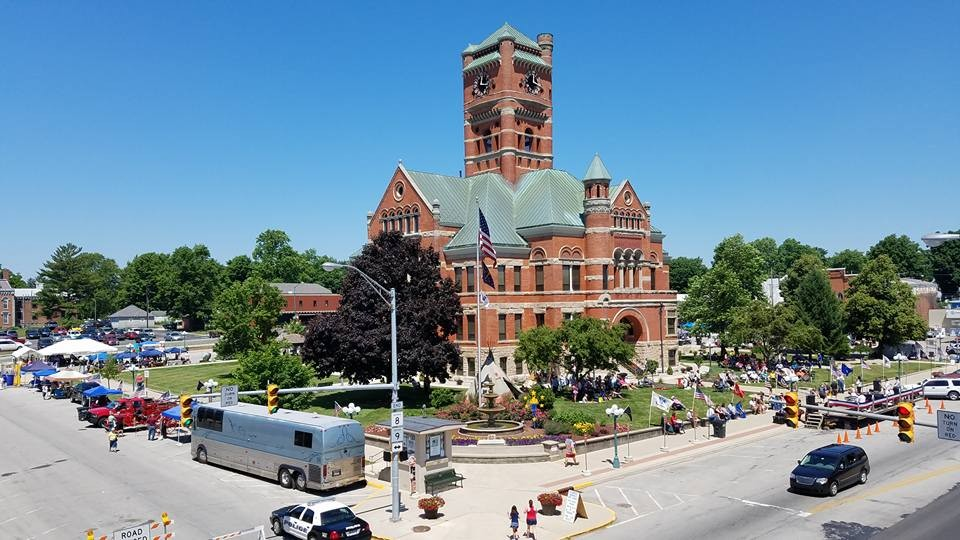
- Noble County Courthouse Square in downtown Albion

- Seal

- Location of Albion in Noble County, Indiana.

- Location within Indiana Location within the United States Location within North America
- Coordinates: 41°23′48″N 85°25′07″W
- Country: United States
- State: Indiana
- County: Noble
- Townships: Albion, Jefferson
- Founded: c. 1846
- Incorporated: 1874

Area
  - Total: 1.91 sq mi (4.94 km^{2})
  - Land: 1.91 sq mi (4.94 km^{2})
  - Water: 0 sq mi (0.00 km^{2})
- Elevation: 942 ft (287 m)

Population (2020)
  - Total: 2,222
  - Density: 1,164.5/sq mi (449.63/km^{2})
- Time zone: UTC−5 (Eastern (EST))
  - Summer (DST): UTC−5 (EST)
- ZIP code: 46701
- Area code: 260
- FIPS code: 18-00820
- GNIS ID: 2397423
- Website: www.albion-in.org

Albion is a town in Albion and Jefferson townships, Noble County, in the U.S. state of Indiana. The population was 2,222 at the 2020 census. The town is the county seat of Noble County.

== History ==
Albion was laid out in 1846. The town was named after Albion, New York. A post office has been in operation at Albion since 1847. Albion was incorporated as a town in 1874.

The Albion Courthouse Square Historic District, Noble County Courthouse, and Noble County Sheriff's House and Jail are listed on the National Register of Historic Places.

== Geography ==
According to the 2020 census, Albion has a total area of 1.91 square miles (4.95 km^{2}), all land.

== Demographics ==
Historical population
Census	Pop.	Note	%±
1870	476		—
1880	926		94.5%
1890	1,229		32.7%
1900	1,324		7.7%
1910	1,213		−8.4%
1920	1,142		−5.9%
1930	1,108		−3.0%
1940	1,234		11.4%
1950	1,341		8.7%
1960	1,325		−1.2%
1970	1,498		13.1%
1980	1,637		9.3%
1990	1,823		11.4%
2000	2,284		25.3%
2010	2,349		2.8%
2020	2,222		−5.4%
U.S. Decennial Census

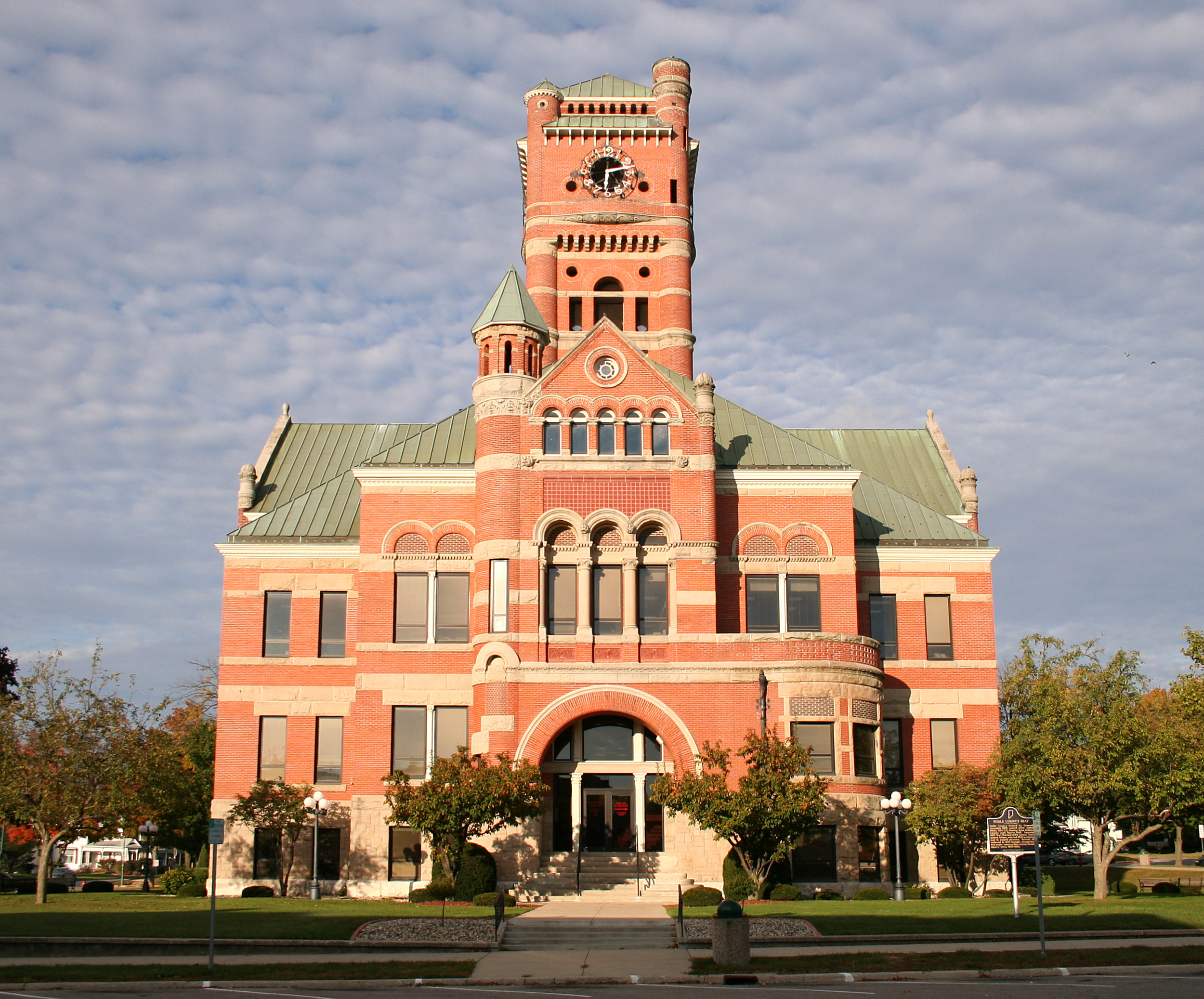
Noble County courthouse.

=== 2020 census ===
As of the 2020 census, Albion had a population of 2,222. The median age was 36.2 years. 23.8% of residents were under the age of 18 and 17.2% of residents were 65 years of age or older. For every 100 females there were 104.4 males, and for every 100 females age 18 and over there were 103.5 males age 18 and over.

0.0% of residents lived in urban areas, while 100.0% lived in rural areas.

There were 890 households in Albion, of which 31.9% had children under the age of 18 living in them. Of all households, 38.1% were married-couple households, 23.1% were households with a male householder and no spouse or partner present, and 30.7% were households with a female householder and no spouse or partner present. About 36.8% of all households were made up of individuals and 14.9% had someone living alone who was 65 years of age or older.

There were 973 housing units, of which 8.5% were vacant. The homeowner vacancy rate was 2.3% and the rental vacancy rate was 6.1%.

Racial composition as of the 2020 census
Race	Number	Percent
White	2,036	91.6%
Black or African American	13	0.6%
American Indian and Alaska Native	8	0.4%
Asian	12	0.5%
Native Hawaiian and Other Pacific Islander	0	0.0%
Some other race	31	1.4%
Two or more races	122	5.5%
Hispanic or Latino (of any race)	110	5.0%

=== 2010 census ===
As of the 2010 census, there were 2,349 people, 831 households, and 530 families living in the town. The population density was 1,229.8 inhabitants per square mile (474.8/km^{2}). There were 951 housing units at an average density of 497.9 per square mile (192.2/km^{2}). The racial makeup of the town was 97.4% White, 0.4% African American, 0.2% Native American, 0.4% Asian, 0.6% from other races, and 1.1% from two or more races. Hispanic or Latino of any race were 3.2% of the population.

There were 831 households, of which 35.7% had children under the age of 18 living with them, 44.0% were married couples living together, 14.4% had a female householder with no husband present, 5.3% had a male householder with no wife present, and 36.2% were non-families. 30.4% of all households were made up of individuals, and 12.2% had someone living alone who was 65 years of age or older. The average household size was 2.46 and the average family size was 3.04.

The median age in the town was 35.3 years. 24.8% of residents were under the age of 18; 8.8% were between the ages of 18 and 24; 30.1% were from 25 to 44; 22% were from 45 to 64; and 14.2% were 65 years of age or older. The gender makeup of the town was 51.1% male and 48.9% female.

=== 2000 census ===
As of the 2000 census, there were 2,284 people, 846 households, and 555 families living in the town. The population density was 1,636.5 inhabitants per square mile (631.9/km^{2}). There were 912 housing units at an average density of 653.5 per square mile (252.3/km^{2}). The racial makeup of the town was 97.37% White, 0.92% African American, 0.35% Native American, 0.04% Asian, 0.88% from other races, and 0.44% from two or more races. Hispanic or Latino of any race were 1.31% of the population.

There were 846 households, out of which 37.1% had children under the age of 18 living with them, 47.8% were married couples living together, 12.6% had a female householder with no husband present, and 34.3% were non-families. 29.7% of all households were made up of individuals, and 10.2% had someone living alone who was 65 years of age or older. The average household size was 2.51 and the average family size was 3.10.

In the town, the population was spread out, with 29.2% under the age of 18, 10.3% from 18 to 24, 33.2% from 25 to 44, 17.0% from 45 to 64, and 10.2% who were 65 years of age or older. The median age was 30 years. For every 100 females, there were 110.7 males. For every 100 females age 18 and over, there were 108.2 males.

The median income for a household in the town was $36,282, and the median income for a family was $43,438. Males had a median income of $31,473 versus $23,531 for females. The per capita income for the town was $16,405. About 4.6% of families and 4.7% of the population were below the poverty line, including 6.7% of those under age 18 and 5.3% of those age 65 or over.

== Education ==
Children living in Albion go to either Central Noble High School, Central Noble Middle School, or Albion Elementary School.

Albion has a public library, a branch of the Noble County Public Library.

Albion is located near Chain O'Lakes State Park.

== Notable people ==
- Earl Butz (1909–2008), former United States Secretary of Agriculture
- Kyle Macy, All-American Basketball player
- Donald H. Spangler, Naval officer, USS Spangler (DE-696) named for and after him.
- Ross Ellet, Emmy and AP-Award Winning Meteorologist at WTVG
