= Middlebury Township, Elkhart County, Indiana =

Middlebury Township
- Township
- Location of Middlebury Township in Elkhart County
- Coordinates: 41°39′11″N 85°43′04″W
- Country: United States
- State: Indiana
- County: Elkhart

Government
  - Type: Indiana township

Area
  - Total: 35.58 sq mi (92.2 km^{2})
  - Land: 35.5 sq mi (92 km^{2})
  - Water: 0.09 sq mi (0.23 km^{2})
- Elevation: 889 ft (271 m)

Population (2020)
  - Total: 8,905
  - Density: 239.4/sq mi (92.4/km^{2})
- FIPS code: 18-48942
- GNIS feature ID: 453623

Middlebury Township is one of sixteen townships in Elkhart County, Indiana. As of the 2000 census, its population was 8,498.

== Geography ==
According to the 2010 census, the township has a total area of 35.58 square miles (92.2 km^{2}), of which 35.5 square miles (92 km^{2}) (or 99.78%) is land and 0.09 square miles (0.23 km^{2}) (or 0.25%) is water.

=== Cities and towns ===
- Middlebury

=== Unincorporated towns ===
- Lake Grange

(This list is based on USGS data and may include former settlements.)

=== Adjacent townships ===
- York Township (north)
- Van Buren Township, LaGrange County (northeast)
- Newbury Township, LaGrange County (east)
- Eden Township, LaGrange County (southeast)
- Clinton Township (south)
- Elkhart Township (southwest)
- Jefferson Township (west)
- Washington Township (northwest)

=== Major highways ===
- US 20
- SR 13

=== Cemeteries ===
The township contains five cemeteries: Eldridge, Forest Grove, Geising, Grace Lawn and Miller.
