= Cromwell, Indiana =

- Town
- Town of Cromwell
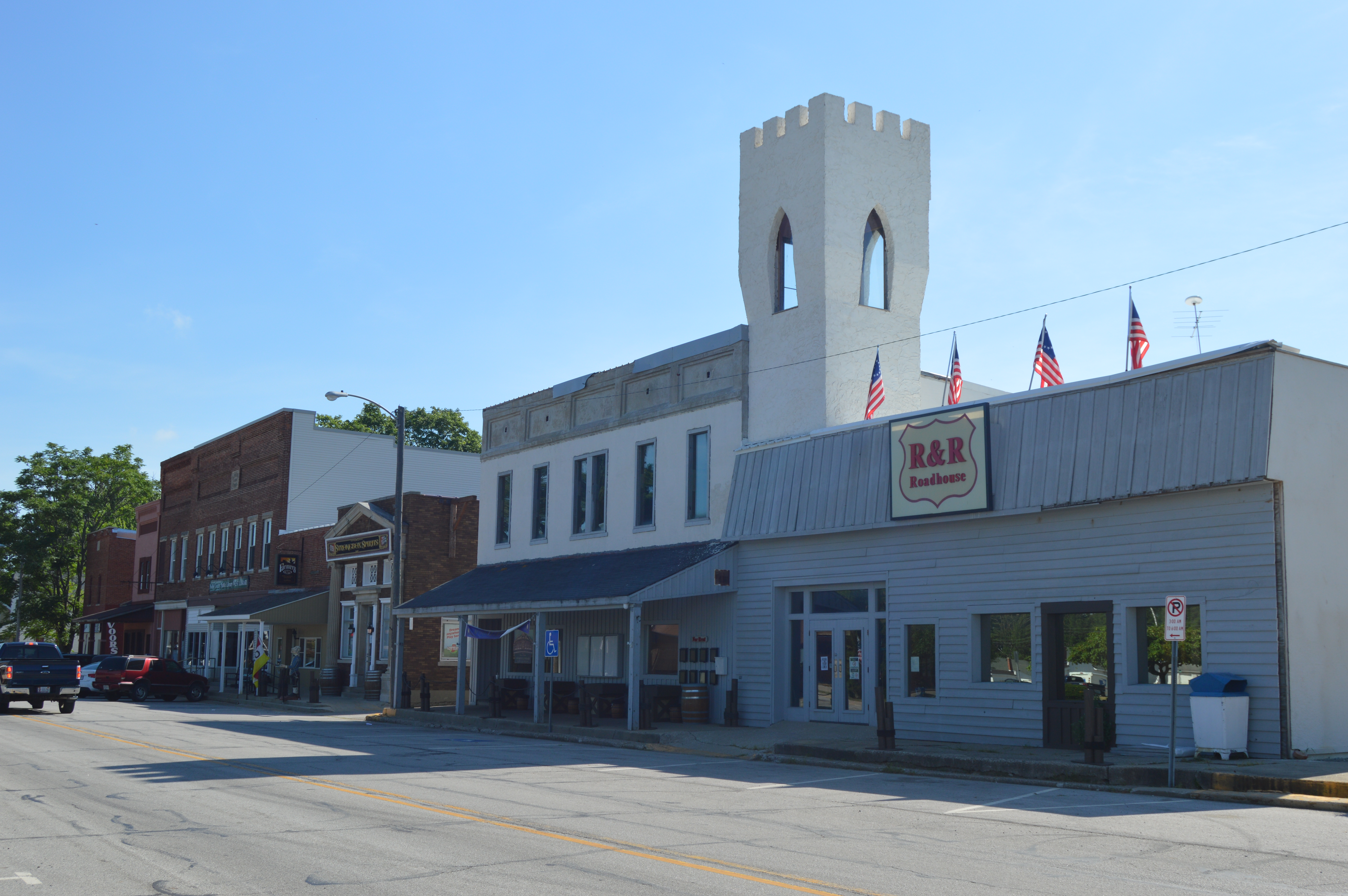
- State Road 5 in the downtown district

- Logo

- Location of Cromwell in Noble County, Indiana.
- Coordinates: 41°24′12″N 85°36′51″W
- Country: United States
- State: Indiana
- County: Noble
- Township: Sparta
- Founded: 1853
- Incorporated: 1906

Area
  - Total: 0.29 sq mi (0.74 km^{2})
  - Land: 0.29 sq mi (0.74 km^{2})
  - Water: 0 sq mi (0.00 km^{2})
- Elevation: 951 ft (290 m)

Population (2020)
  - Total: 487
  - Density: 1,697.9/sq mi (655.55/km^{2})
- Time zone: UTC-5 (Eastern (EST))
  - Summer (DST): UTC-5 (EST)
- ZIP code: 46732
- Area code: 260
- FIPS code: 18-15994
- GNIS feature ID: 2396668
- Website: www.in.gov/towns/cromwell/

Cromwell is a town in Sparta Township, Noble County, in the U.S. state of Indiana. The population was 487 at the 2020 census.

== History ==
Cromwell was platted in 1853, and so named for the fact its founder was an admirer of English politician Oliver Cromwell. A post office has been in operation at Cromwell since 1851. Cromwell was incorporated as a town in 1906.

The Cromwell Historic District was listed on the National Register of Historic Places in 2015.

== Geography ==
According to the 2010 census, Cromwell has a total area of 0.3 square miles (0.78 km^{2}), all land.

== Demographics ==
Historical population
Census	Pop.	Note	%±
1880	350		—
1910	520		—
1920	420		−19.2%
1930	371		−11.7%
1940	399		7.5%
1950	449		12.5%
1960	451		0.4%
1970	475		5.3%
1980	458		−3.6%
1990	520		13.5%
2000	452		−13.1%
2010	512		13.3%
2020	487		−4.9%
U.S. Decennial Census

=== 2010 census ===
As of the census of 2010, there were 512 people, 183 households, and 126 families living in the town. The population density was 1,706.7 inhabitants per square mile (659.0/km^{2}). There were 222 housing units at an average density of 740.0 per square mile (285.7/km^{2}). The racial makeup of the town was 92.6% White, 0.2% Native American, 6.1% from other races, and 1.2% from two or more races. Hispanic or Latino of any race were 12.9% of the population.

There were 183 households, of which 42.6% had children under the age of 18 living with them, 42.1% were married couples living together, 19.1% had a female householder with no husband present, 7.7% had a male householder with no wife present, and 31.1% were non-families. 25.7% of all households were made up of individuals, and 7.7% had someone living alone who was 65 years of age or older. The average household size was 2.80 and the average family size was 3.29.

The median age in the town was 30.6 years. 30.1% of residents were under the age of 18; 12.8% were between the ages of 18 and 24; 25.2% were from 25 to 44; 24.2% were from 45 to 64; and 7.6% were 65 years of age or older. The gender makeup of the town was 46.5% male and 53.5% female.

=== 2000 census ===
As of the census of 2000, there were 452 people, 180 households, and 120 families living in the town. The population density was 1,523.3 inhabitants per square mile (588.1/km^{2}). There were 193 housing units at an average density of 650.4 per square mile (251.1/km^{2}). The racial makeup of the town was 94.25% White, 1.33% Asian, 1.11% from other races, and 3.32% from two or more races. Hispanic or Latino of any race were 4.87% of the population.

There were 180 households, out of which 35.0% had children under the age of 18 living with them, 48.9% were married couples living together, 12.2% had a female householder with no husband present, and 33.3% were non-families. 28.3% of all households were made up of individuals, and 12.2% had someone living alone who was 65 years of age or older. The average household size was 2.51 and the average family size was 3.11.

In the town, the population was spread out, with 28.1% under the age of 18, 11.3% from 18 to 24, 28.1% from 25 to 44, 21.0% from 45 to 64, and 11.5% who were 65 years of age or older. The median age was 32 years. For every 100 females there were 96.5 males. For every 100 females age 18 and over, there were 84.7 males.

The median income for a household in the town was $38,438, and the median income for a family was $43,750. Males had a median income of $32,422 versus $20,547 for females. The per capita income for the town was $15,664. About 11.7% of families and 14.7% of the population were below the poverty line, including 17.6% of those under age 18 and 14.3% of those age 65 or over.

== Education ==
Cromwell has a public library, a branch of the Noble County Public Library.
