= Noble County Courthouse (Indiana) =

- U.S. National Register of Historic Places
- U.S. Historic district – Contributing property
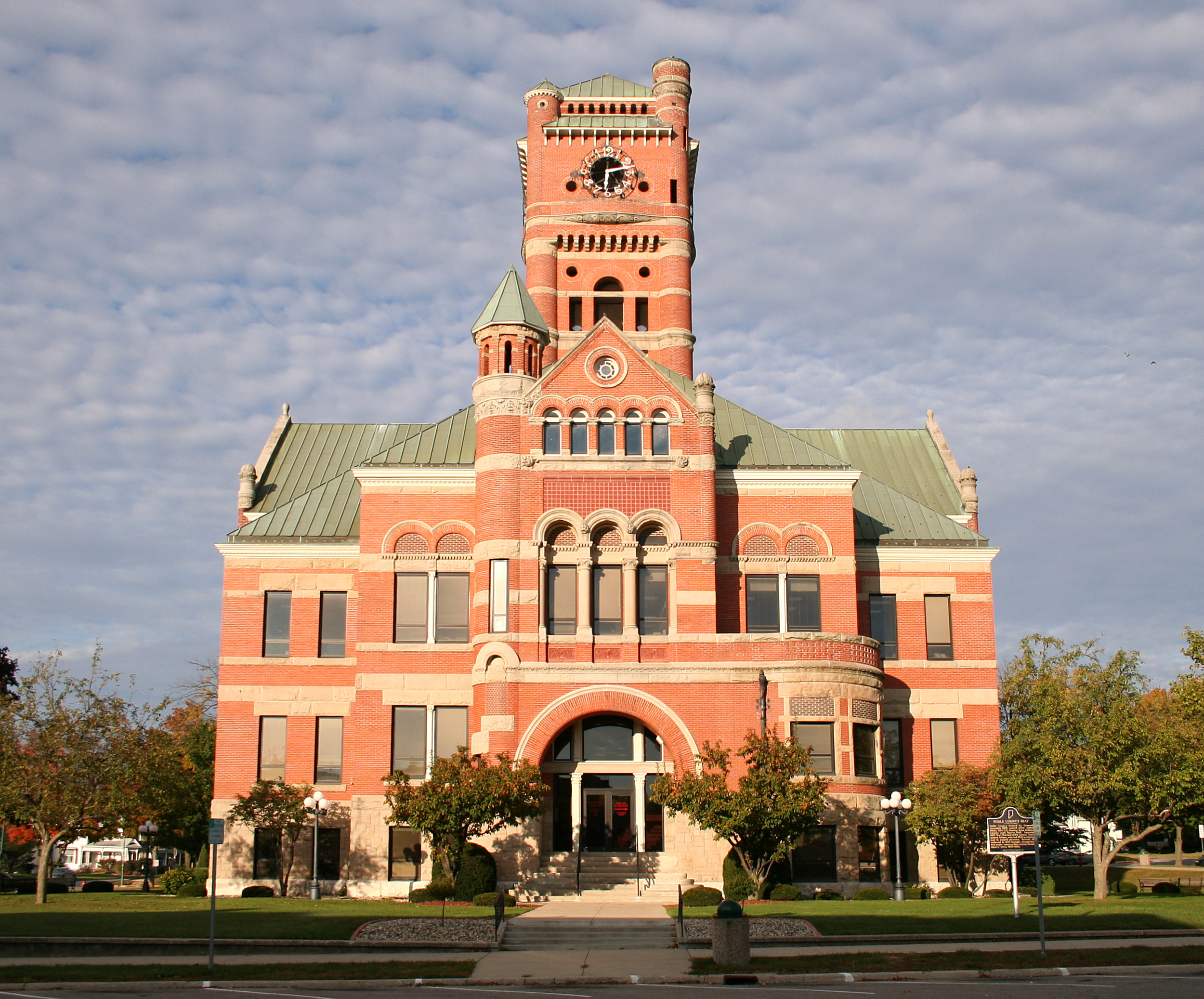

- Location within Indiana Location within the United States
- Location: 101 N. Orange St., Albion, Indiana, United States
- Coordinates: 41°23′45″N 85°25′28″W
- Area: 2 acres (0.81 ha)
- Built: 1887
- Built by: M.J. Malone & Bros.
- Architect: E. O. Fallis & Co.
- Architectural style: Richardsonian Romanesque
- NRHP reference No.: 81000005
- Added to NRHP: May 12, 1981

The Noble County Courthouse is a historic courthouse in Albion, Indiana. It was designed by E.O. Fallis & Co. and was built in 1887. It is a 2½-story, Richardsonian Romanesque style red brick building with limestone trim. It has a steep hipped roof topped by a massive square center tower.

It was listed on the National Register of Historic Places in 1981. It is located in the Albion Courthouse Square Historic District.
