= Ligonier Historic District (Ligonier, Indiana) =

Historic district in Indiana, United States

- U.S. National Register of Historic Places
- U.S. Historic district
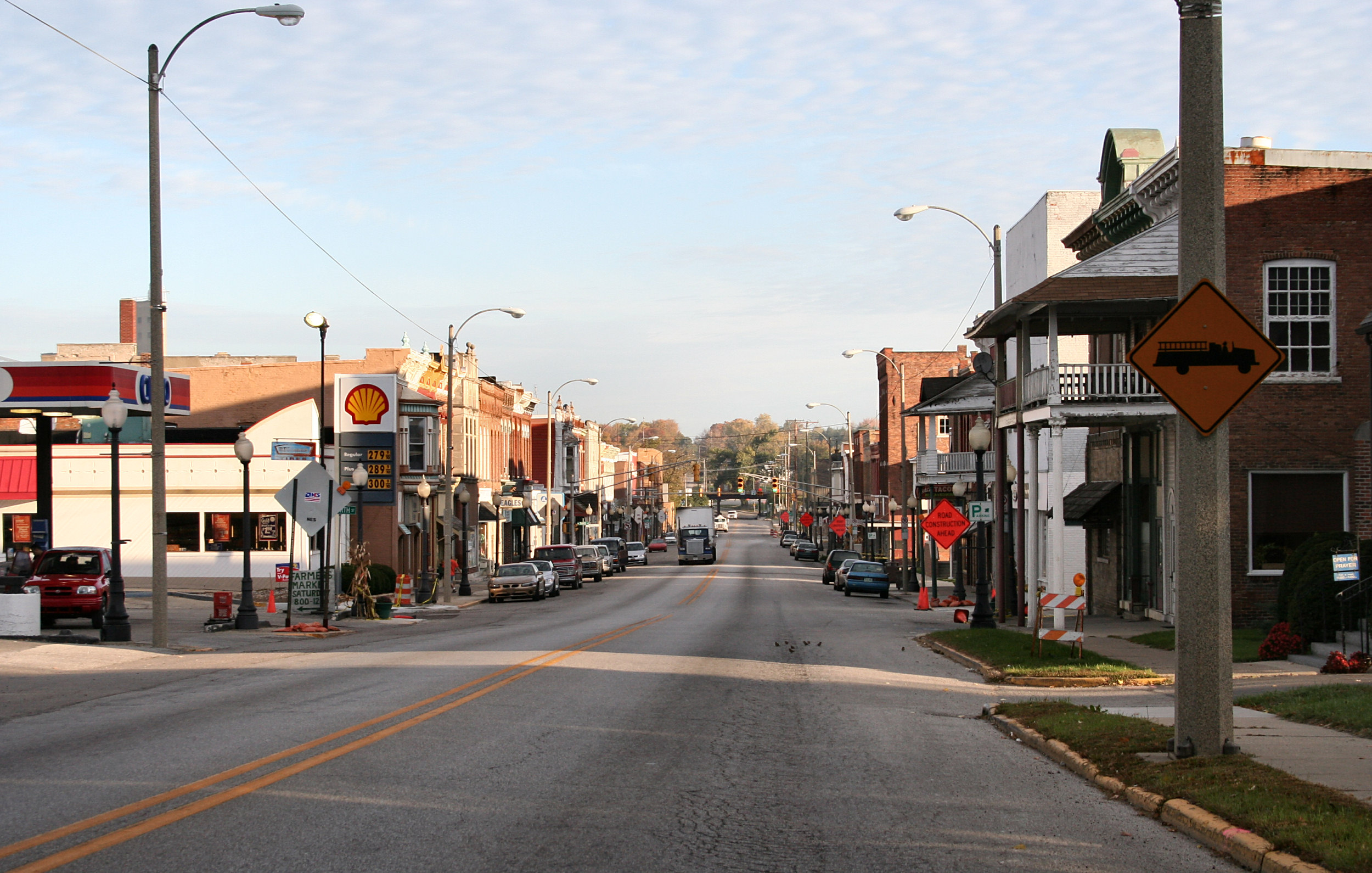
- Downtown Ligonier, October 2005

- Location within Indiana Location within the United States
- Location: Roughly bounded by Conrail right-of-way, Smith, Union, College, & Grand Sts., Ligonier, Indiana
- Coordinates: 41°27′46″N 85°35′28″W
- Area: 146 acres (59 ha)
- Architect: Multiple
- Architectural style: Late 19th- and 20th-century revivals, late Victorian, bungalow/craftsman
- NRHP reference No.: 87001798
- Added to NRHP: October 23, 1987

Ligonier Historic District is a national historic district in Ligonier, Indiana. The district encompasses 253 contributing buildings and two contributing objects in Ligonier. It was developed between about 1835 and 1937, and includes notable examples of Italianate, Queen Anne, Gothic Revival, Classical Revival, and Bungalow / American Craftsman style architecture. Located in the district are the separately listed Ahavas Shalom Reform Temple and Jacob Straus House. Other notable buildings include the Dr. Enos Fenton Residence (c. 1855), Silas Shobe Residence (c. 1870), Eli Gerber Residence (1874), Oscar Parks Residence (1892), Solomon Mier Residence (1906), Simon Schloss Residence (1912), Gentry Hotel (1870), Straus Brothers Block (1888), Zimmerman Block (1870, 1906), former Universalist Church (1856), First Presbyterian Church (1890), Ligonier Public Library (1908), Ligonier City Building (1914), U.S. Post Office (1935), Lyon and Greenleaf Flour Mill (1886), and former Mier Carriage Factory (1891).

It was listed on the National Register of Historic Places in 1987.

== History ==
The Ligonier Historic District is one of the most intact groups of historic and architectural buildings in Ligonier. The district developed during 1835 to 1937. It was first called Perry's Prairie, a natural clearing settled by white inhabitants in 1833. Ligonier was platted in 1835. The town was overshadowed by Rochester, another settlement on the Elkhart River, 2 miles (3.2 km) to the southeast in 1836. Ligonier was located on a state road and north of another, which allowed it to soon outpace the town of Rochester. In 1854 the construction of a railroad, completed in 1857, through the town, led to five additions to the city's street plan, which more than doubled the population by start of the American Civil War. Greater growth came after the war, spurred by the direct rail connections to Chicago and Toledo.

At the end of the nineteenth century the Jewish community had become a significant influence in the town. The itinerant peddlers Frederick William Straus and Solomon Mier arrived in 1854 following the construction of the railroad. Each became local merchants and then founded the two major banks. The Banking House of Solomon Mier (1862) later became the Mier Bank. Frederick Straus opened the Citizens Bank (1868) with his brothers Jacob and Mathias.

The community grew as more settlers arrived in northern Indiana from Germany via the Pennsylvania and Ohio German communities of Jews, Mennonites and Amish. The Jewish community of Noble and Dekalb counties was a dispersed community amongst the other German Mennonite settlers by 1858. The community was large enough that they organized the Congregation Ahavas Shalom (Lovers of Peace). Initially they met in Auburn, the seat of DeKalb County. Ligonier was more tolerant of the community's presence and participation in social and political life. Congregation Ahavas Shalom soon began holding its meetings in the Jewish homes of Ligonier. The first permanent building was a wooden structure, in 1871. By 1889, the Ahavas Shalom Temple was dedicated with a membership of some 60 Jewish families, or a quarter (27%) of the town's population (some 600 persons of approximately 2,200) Ligonier's Jews were among all of the city's merchants, bankers, and professionals.

Solomon Mier's banking interests expanded to Fort Wayne, as the Citizens Trust Company. He also financed the construction of trolley lines across Noble County. The Straus brothers' (Straus Quality Farms) brokerage business, begun in 1860, became the largest in the United States, with offices in thirteen Midwestern states. The Straus brothers also established banks in six states and Ontario, Canada.

The Jewish community's successes saw later generations move to larger cities, like Chicago, South Bend, Fort Wayne, and Toledo. By 1904, the community was so small that the temple was supported by a rabbi who traveled there weekly from South Bend. By 1920, the number of Jewish families in Ligonier had dwindled to 24. The Jewish Social Club closed in 1915; the B'nai B'rith Lodge (1878) closed in (1936). After 1932, services were held in the temple only on High Holy Days.
