= Sparta Township, Noble County, Indiana =

Sparta Township
- Township
- Coordinates: 41°23′44″N 85°35′36″W
- Country: United States
- State: Indiana
- County: Noble

Government
  - Type: Indiana township

Area
  - Total: 35.24 sq mi (91.3 km^{2})
  - Land: 34.95 sq mi (90.5 km^{2})
  - Water: 0.3 sq mi (0.78 km^{2})
- Elevation: 971 ft (296 m)

Population (2020)
  - Total: 2,776
  - Density: 83.7/sq mi (32.3/km^{2})
- Time zone: UTC-5 (Eastern (EST))
  - Summer (DST): UTC-4 (EDT)
- Area code: 260
- FIPS code: 18-71756
- GNIS feature ID: 453858

Sparta Township is one of thirteen townships in Noble County, Indiana. As of the 2020 census, its population was 2,776 (down from 2,924 at 2010) and it contained 1,128 housing units.

== History ==
Stone's Trace was listed on the National Register of Historic Places in 1984.

== Geography ==
According to the 2010 census, the township has a total area of 35.24 square miles (91.3 km^{2}), of which 34.95 square miles (90.5 km^{2}) (or 99.18%) is land and 0.3 square miles (0.78 km^{2}) (or 0.85%) is water.

=== Cities and towns ===
- Cromwell

=== Unincorporated towns ===
- Indian Village at 41.3658806°N 85.6394300°W
- Kimmell at 41.3953260°N 85.5483164°W

(This list is based on USGS data and may include former settlements.)
