= Ligonier, Indiana =

- City
- City of Ligonier
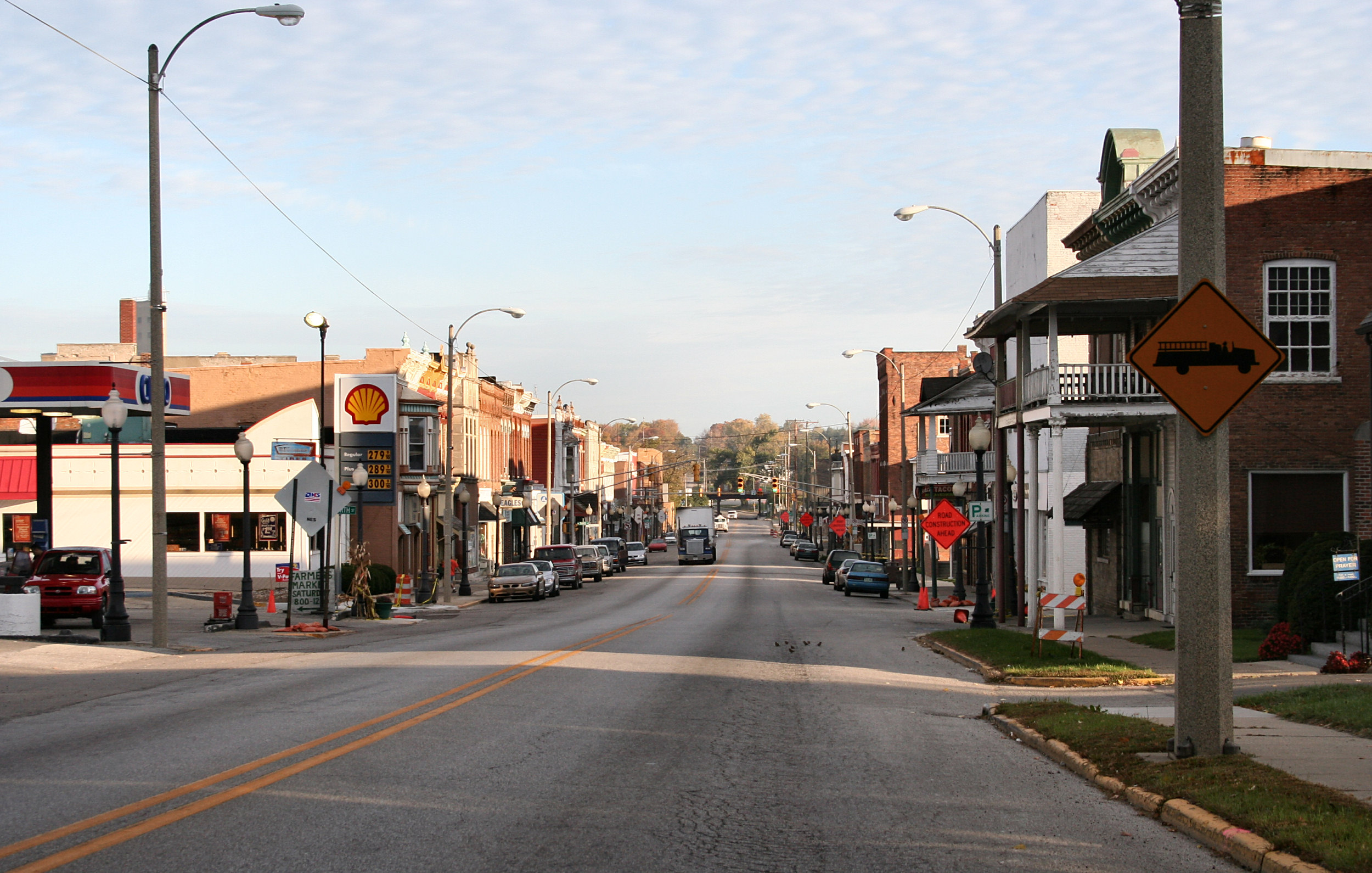
- Downtown Ligonier

- Seal
- Motto: "City of Murals"
- Location of Ligonier in Noble County, Indiana
- Coordinates: 41°27′45″N 85°35′41″W
- Country: United States
- State: Indiana
- County: Noble
- Township: Perry
- Established: 1835

Government
  - Mayor: Earle Franklin (R)

Area
  - Total: 2.80 sq mi (7.26 km^{2})
  - Land: 2.80 sq mi (7.25 km^{2})
  - Water: 0 sq mi (0.00 km^{2}) 0%
- Elevation: 906 ft (276 m)

Population (2020)
  - Total: 4,568
  - Density: 1,630.8/sq mi (629.65/km^{2})
- Time zone: UTC-5 (Eastern (EST))
  - Summer (DST): UTC-4 (EDT)
- ZIP code: 46767
- Area code: 260
- FIPS code: 18-43686
- GNIS feature ID: 2395706
- Website: www.in.gov/cities/ligonier/

Ligonier (/lɪɡəˈnir/ lig-uh-NEER) is a city in Perry Township, Noble County, in the U.S. state of Indiana. The population was 4,568 at the 2020 census.

== History ==
Ligonier was platted in 1835. The city was named after the Pennsylvanian borough of the same name. A post office has been in operation at Ligonier since 1848.

Ligonier was home to A. J. Inks' Crystal Theatre from 1906 to 1970.

In 1940, a post office mural was completed by Fay E. Davis as a work commissioned through the federal Section of Painting and Sculpture, later called the Section of Fine Arts, of the Treasury Department. The mural, Cutting Timber, depicts lumberjacks felling trees and removing them by oxcart.

The Ahavas Shalom Reform Temple, Ligonier Historic District, and Jacob Straus House are listed on the National Register of Historic Places.

== Geography ==
According to the 2010 census, Ligonier has a total area of 2.31 square miles (5.98 km^{2}), all land.

== Demographics ==
Historical population
Census	Pop.	Note	%±
1870	1,514		—
1880	2,010		32.8%
1890	2,195		9.2%
1900	2,231		1.6%
1910	2,173		−2.6%
1920	2,037		−6.3%
1930	2,064		1.3%
1940	2,178		5.5%
1950	2,375		9.0%
1960	2,595		9.3%
1970	3,034		16.9%
1980	3,134		3.3%
1990	3,443		9.9%
2000	4,357		26.5%
2010	4,405		1.1%
2020	4,568		3.7%
U.S. Decennial Census

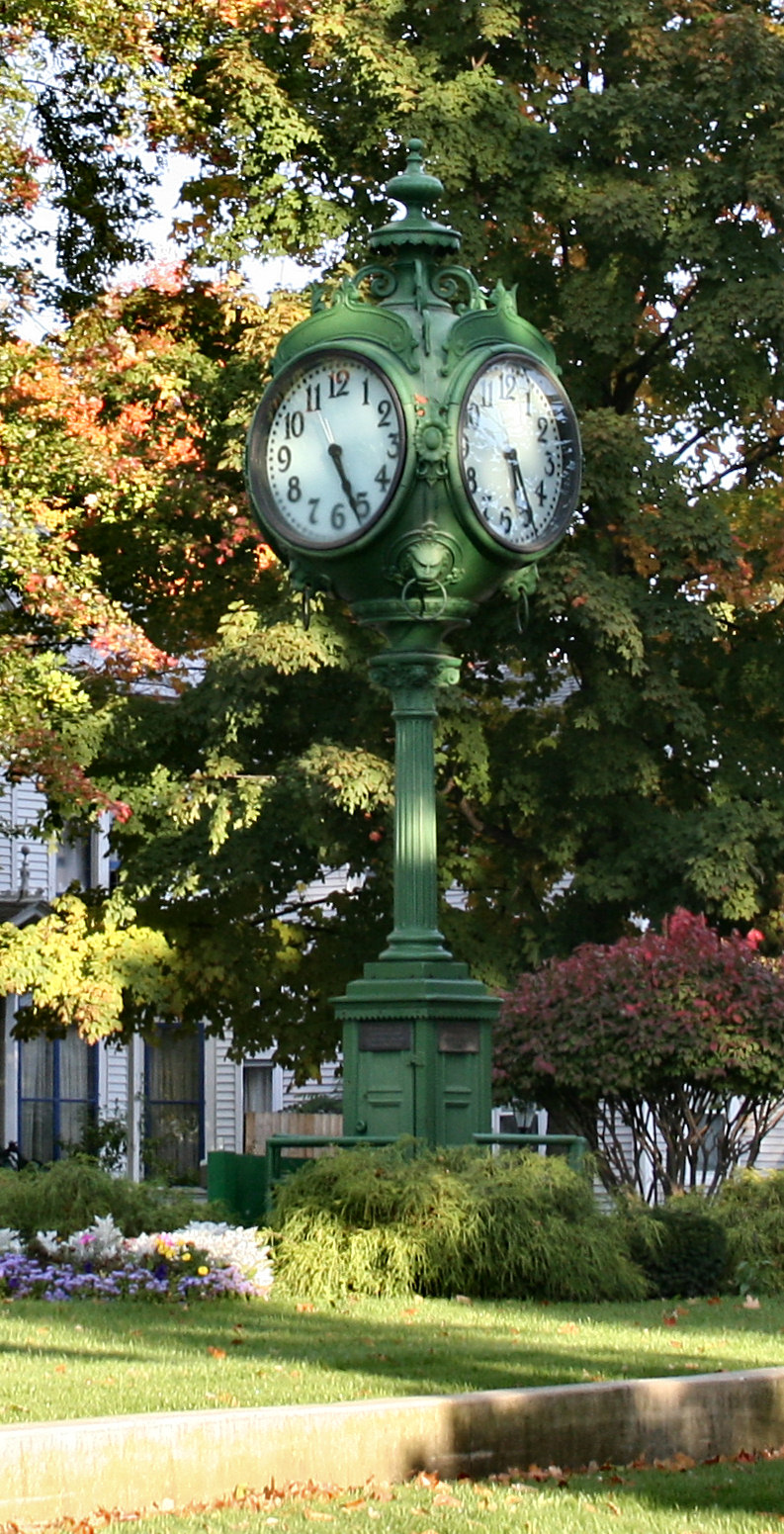
Ligonier town clock

=== 2020 census ===
As of the 2020 census, Ligonier had a population of 4,568. The median age was 30.2 years. 29.5% of residents were under the age of 18 and 10.4% of residents were 65 years of age or older. For every 100 females there were 100.8 males, and for every 100 females age 18 and over there were 101.6 males age 18 and over.

0.0% of residents lived in urban areas, while 100.0% lived in rural areas.

There were 1,466 households in Ligonier, of which 43.2% had children under the age of 18 living in them. Of all households, 47.5% were married-couple households, 18.8% were households with a male householder and no spouse or partner present, and 25.4% were households with a female householder and no spouse or partner present. About 24.2% of all households were made up of individuals and 8.6% had someone living alone who was 65 years of age or older.

There were 1,646 housing units, of which 10.9% were vacant. The homeowner vacancy rate was 1.1% and the rental vacancy rate was 9.9%.

Racial composition as of the 2020 census
Race	Number	Percent
White	2,220	48.6%
Black or African American	27	0.6%
American Indian and Alaska Native	82	1.8%
Asian	33	0.7%
Native Hawaiian and Other Pacific Islander	1	0.0%
Some other race	1,397	30.6%
Two or more races	808	17.7%
Hispanic or Latino (of any race)	2,690	58.9%

=== 2010 census ===
As of the census of 2010, there were 4,405 people, 1,333 households, and 978 families living in the city. The population density was 1,906.9 inhabitants per square mile (736.3/km^{2}). There were 1,550 housing units at an average density of 671.0 per square mile (259.1/km^{2}). The racial makeup of the city was 69.6% White, 0.4% African American, 0.2% Native American, 0.5% Asian, 26.6% from other races, and 2.7% from two or more races. Hispanic or Latino people of any race were 51.5% of the population.

There were 1,333 households, of which 49.3% had children under the age of 18 living with them, 52.5% were married couples living together, 14.8% had a female householder with no husband present, 6.1% had a male householder with no wife present, and 26.6% were non-families. 22.1% of all households were made up of individuals, and 8.4% had someone living alone who was 65 years of age or older. The average household size was 3.26 and the average family size was 3.83.

The median age in the city was 28.5 years. 34.7% of residents were under the age of 18; 9.6% were between the ages of 18 and 24; 28.3% were from 25 to 44; 19.5% were from 45 to 64; and 8% were 65 years of age or older. The gender makeup of the city was 49.8% male and 50.2% female.

=== 2000 census ===
As of the census of 2000, there were 4,357 people, 1,390 households, and 1,021 families living in the city. The population density was 1,936.7 inhabitants per square mile (747.8/km^{2}). There were 1,483 housing units at an average density of 659.2 per square mile (254.5/km^{2}). The racial makeup of the city was 73.24% White, 0.53% African American, 0.16% Native American, 0.41% Asian, 24.70% from other races, and 0.96% from two or more races. Hispanic or Latino people of any race were 33.30% of the population.

There were 1,390 households, out of which 39.3% had children under the age of 18 living with them, 53.7% were married couples living together, 12.6% had a female householder with no husband present, and 26.5% were non-families. 21.4% of all households were made up of individuals, and 9.6% had someone living alone who was 65 years of age or older. The average household size was 3.08 and the average family size was 3.52.

In the city, the population was spread out, with 31.4% under the age of 18, 13.0% from 18 to 24, 28.2% from 25 to 44, 17.2% from 45 to 64, and 10.3% who were 65 years of age or older. The median age was 28 years. For every 100 females, there were 103.7 males. For every 100 females age 18 and over, there were 102.2 males.

The median income for a household in the city was $36,546, and the median income for a family was $42,757. Males had a median income of $31,596 versus $23,938 for females. The per capita income for the city was $14,448. About 7.5% of families and 14.3% of the population were below the poverty line, including 17.7% of those under age 18 and 6.0% of those age 65 or over.

== Education ==
Ligonier is served by the West Noble School Corporation which maintains four schools at two locations in and around Ligonier. The West Noble Primary School serves students in kindergarten and first grade. It is located at 500 West Union Street. The West Noble Elementary School (WNES) is located on the WNSC campus south of Ligonier on US-33. Grades 2-4 students who live outside Ligonier city limits attend WNES. The West Noble Middle School is located on the WNSC campus south of Ligonier on US-33. This building has grades 5–8. The West Noble High School is located on the WNSC campus south of Ligonier on US-33. All students grades 9-12 from Ligonier and the surrounding area attend this facility.

The town has a lending library, the Ligonier Public Library.

== Media ==
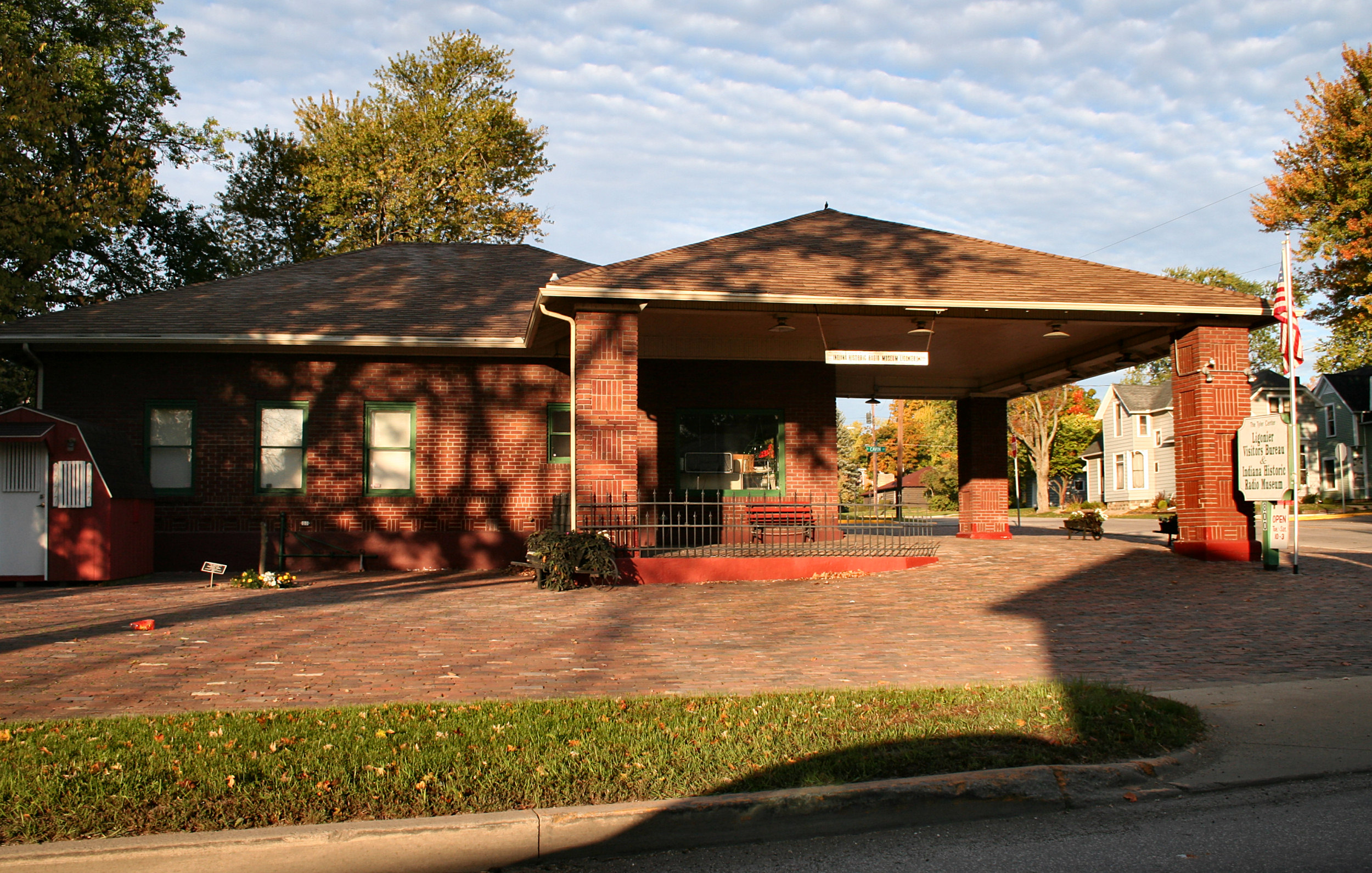
Historic Radio Museum and Visitor's Bureau

The Advance Leader, serving western Noble County, became part of KPC Media Group Inc. in May 1975. The weekly Cromwell Advance was founded in 1912 by Forrest Robbins. The weekly Ligonier Leader was founded in 1880 by E.G. Thompson. The two mastheads were merged to form the Advance Leader, with the first issue published on May 14, 1975. The weekly paper was published until 2020, when it was shuttered during the COVID-19 pandemic. Ligonier is still covered by the county's daily newspaper, the News Sun, published by KPC Media.

== Marshmallow capital ==
According to the National Confectioners Association, Ligonier is the marshmallow capital of the world.

== Notable people ==
- Dwight H. Green, former governor of Illinois
- Bert Inks (A. J. Inks), baseball pitcher and Crystal Theatre proprietor
- Uriel Macias, retired professional soccer player
- Douglas Rex, past president of American College of Gastroenterology
- Glen Steele, retired professional football player, attended West Noble High School
