= Stromsburg Public School =

Secondary school in Nebraska, United States

Coordinates: 41°06′53″N 97°35′37″W

Stromsburg High School was a public high school located in the community of Stromsburg, Nebraska, United States. It was founded in 1887 and closed in 2002, after consolidation with Benedict, Nebraska (forming Cross County High School). The school's mascot was the Vikings. In 1999, the Stromsburg Vikings football team won the Nebraska Class C-2 football championship against Randolph.
