= Western Association of Writers =

The Western Association of Writers was an American writers' organization founded in Indiana. It enrolled among its members men and women who were early or seasoned in their careers.

== Founding ==
In 1885, a few ambitious Indiana writers agitated the idea of a society of writers. The pioneers in the movement were Marie Louise Andrews, J. C. Ochiltree, Dr. James Newton Matthews, Richard Lew Dawson and Dr. W. H. Taylor. These writers were all contributors to the Indianapolis Herald in the winter of 1885–86, and the idea of a writers' association was made public through its columns. The matter was also discussed in correspondence, with the result that a call was finally made to all writers whose addresses could be obtained, and it appeared in the Chicago Current of April 3, 1886: "To the Literary Profession: A call is hereby extended to all writers of verse and general literature. and especially to the writers of the Wabash Valley and the adjacent states to meet in convention in June 1886 at the city of Terre Haute or Indianapolis, Indiana." The call also stated that the objects of the meeting were "to form an association of the literary profession for mutual strength, profit and acquaintance; to discuss the methods of composition, and all topics pertaining to the advancement of literature in America; to produce and publish a representative volume of the western authors from the miscellaneous poems, stories and sketches read during this convention or festival."

The response to this call indicated Indianapolis as the preferred meeting place. Hence, on June 30, 1886, in Plymouth Church, in that city, 75 writers met, and over 100 poems and stories were read as their contribution to the occasion. With much enthusiasm, prominent writers appeared at the public gathering, and the Association was inaugurated. Maurice Thompson, the poet, was the first president of the Association, and James Whitcomb Riley was on the executive committee. Thompson was also the second president, and the role of chief executives during the first 11 years was made up of Hon. Benjamin Stratton Parker, Dr. John Clark Ridpath, Hon. Cyrus Finley McNutt, Dr. Taylor, Hon. Thomas B. Redding, Prof. A. W. Butler and Dr. William Henry Venable.

== History ==
Three volumes of the annual meetings of the Association were issued, covering the meetings up to 1892, and representing collections of verse and prose. All the annual conventions through that time, with the exception of one, were held at Winona Park, an assembly area near Warsaw, Indiana, somewhat on the Chautauqua plan. This place became regarded by the Association as home, and, when convened there, the sessions were better attended than elsewhere. Indiana furnished the greatest number of members to the Association, but there were many representatives from Ohio, Illinois, and Kentucky, as well as Missouri, Michigan, Kansas, California, Nebraska, Colorado, South Dakota, and Wisconsin; Canada was also represented.

The Western Association of Writers meant much to the Indiana literary. The annual meetings at Winona Lake were not expensive affairs. The railroads gave reduced rates, the hotels furnish accommodations at the assembly ground, and there were facilities for camping. The annual meeting was the centerpiece of all literary workers in the last days of June and the first ones of July. It was the simplest of meetings; there was no banqueting, no reveling, and no alcohol. To the initiated, this method of celebrating a literary festival was full of significance.

The papers read at subsequent meetings of the Association were, to one not before in attendance at the meetings, quite strong, showing remarkable facility of expression, besides a high degree of scholarship and critical ability. The general expression of the older members, however, would tend to the idea that the meeting of 1896 was not above the average in the quality of the papers presented.

== Notable people ==
With the election of Dr. Venable of Cincinnati to the presidency of the Association in 1895, the Ohio interest became stronger and a new element was introduced. The majority of the men and women in the body were too broad-minded to wish the organization to remain sectional. The greatest step in the direction of universalism was taken, however, when Venable enrolled for the Association a list of the best writers of Southern Ohio, they being in full accord with his ideas of the development of a broad literary culture and an individual interest in all efforts to promote literary interest in the Midwest.

Prof. Amos W. Butler of Brookville, Indiana was better known to the scientific world than to the literary. He wrote on topics connected with literature as well as anthropology, zoology and associated subjects. The Hon. William Cumback was an Indiana politician, orator, forceful writer, and notable lyceum speaker. A wise counselor and a warm supporter of the Association, a large volume of his lectures and addresses, edited by Dr. Ridpath, were published. Dr. Ridpath, the historian and for many years, president of DePauw University, was known among scholars throughout the world, his books and articles including Popular History of the United States, Cyclopedia of Universal History, History of Races, Life of James G. Blaine, and Life and Works of Gladstone.

James Whitcomb Riley, co-founder and poet, published the following books: The Lesson and Other Poems, The Cabin in the Clearing, Hoosier Bards, and Rhymes of Our Neighborhood. Instead of presenting one of his own poems at an Association meeting, Parker read a production by a young African-American, Paul Dunbar, whom the Association discovered when they held a meeting in Dayton, Ohio, and whose work William Dean Howells included in some columns in Harper's Weekly. Gen. Lew Wallace, soldier, scholar, statesman, diplomat, and novelist was a strong supporter of the Association. A man who contributed much to the success of the Association was Dr. James Newton Matthews, of Mason, Illinois, a co-founder and one of the most popular writers of the west. Various other writers were supporters and members of the Association, and these included Dr. David Starr Jordan, Eugene Fitch Ware, W. W. Pfrimmer, of Kentland. Indiana, who was often elected to some position on the official board, and Captain Lee O. Harris, editor of Home and School. Judge Alfred Ellison, of Anderson, Indiana, Judge D. P. Baldwin, and Joseph S. Reed, of Sullivan, Indiana were also pioneer friends of the Association, along with Col. Coates Kinney, of Norwood, Ohio, Soule Smith, of Lexington, Kentucky, Lawrence Mendenhall, of Cincinnati, John Uri Lloyd, author of Etidorhpa, Dr. Lawrence C. Carr, of Cincinnati, R. Ellsworth Call, a scholar and authority on college affairs, Dr. John M. Crawford, counsel to St. Petersburg, and F. F. Oldham, of Queen City, Ohio.

Of the number of women in the Association, perhaps the most successful and best known were Mary Hartwell Catherwood, of Hoopeston, Illinois, Alice Williams Brotherton, the Cincinnati poet, Idael Makeever of Nebraska, and Bessie Woolford, called the "Poet of the Ohio River". Minnetta Theodora Taylor served as the organization's president in 1903. Among the names of women writers on the list of members of the Association were Mary Elizabeth Caldwell Zedtwitz, Mrs. E. S. Thompson, Ida May Davis, Hannah E. Davis, Evaleen Stem, Minnie Thomas Boyce, Elizabeth Hiatt Gregory, Elora Steams Venter, Lulia C. Aldrich, of Wauseon, Eva Best, of Dayton, May Wright Sewall, of Indianapolis, M. Sears Brooks of Madison, Indiana, and Angeline Teal of Kendallville, Indiana.
