= Iowa Wind Mill and Pump Company Office and Warehouse =

- U.S. National Register of Historic Places
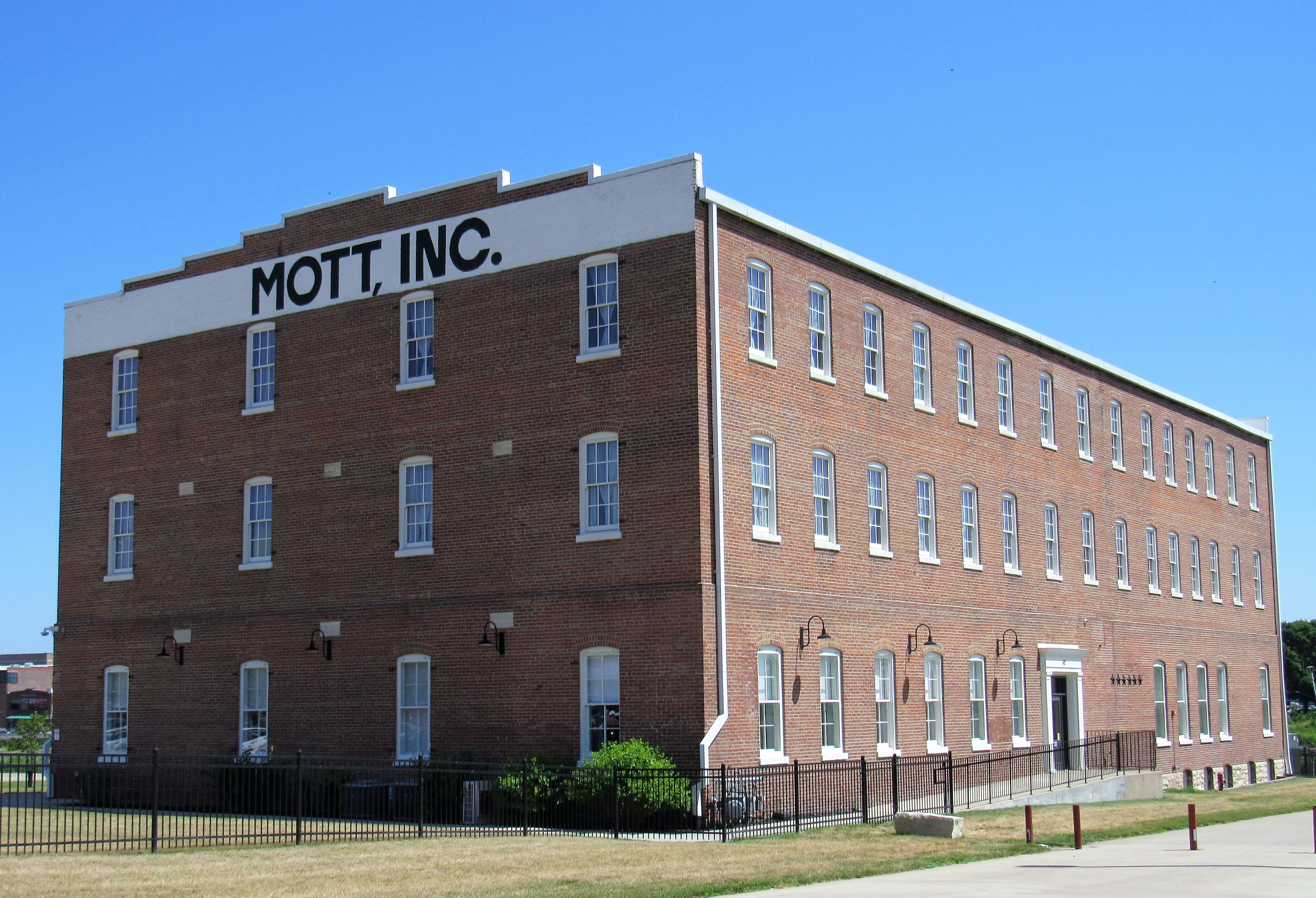

- Location within Iowa Location within the United States
- Location: 42 7th Ave., SW; Cedar Rapids, Iowa
- Coordinates: 41°58′18.3″N 91°40′3.9″W
- Area: 1.7 acres (0.69 ha)
- Built: 1902
- Architectural style: Late Victorian
- MPS: Cedar Rapids, Iowa MPS
- NRHP reference No.: 12000890
- Added to NRHP: October 31, 2012

The Iowa Wind Mill and Pump Company Office and Warehouse, also known as Iowa Pipe and Supply Company, Cedar Rapids Presort, and the Mott Building, is a historic building located in Cedar Rapids, Iowa, United States. This is the only extant building of a complex of buildings along the Cedar River used by the Iowa Wind Mill and Pump Company. The three-story structure is a simplified version of Victorian architecture. The thick brick walls were a form of fire protection and insulation, while the heavy timber for the interior support structure created large open space that was required to house industrial equipment, production activities, and warehouse storage. The tall windows allowed for interior lighting and ventilation. The first floor provided finished space used for offices. Iowa Wind Mill and Pump Company began as a branch of the Kendallville, Indiana based Flint & Walling Manufacturing Company around 1890. They began building their complex of buildings along the Cedar River and the tracks of the Chicago and North Western Railroad the following year. This building was completed in 1902. It was listed on the National Register of Historic Places in 2012.
