= Stromsburg, Nebraska =

City in Polk County, Nebraska, United States

- City
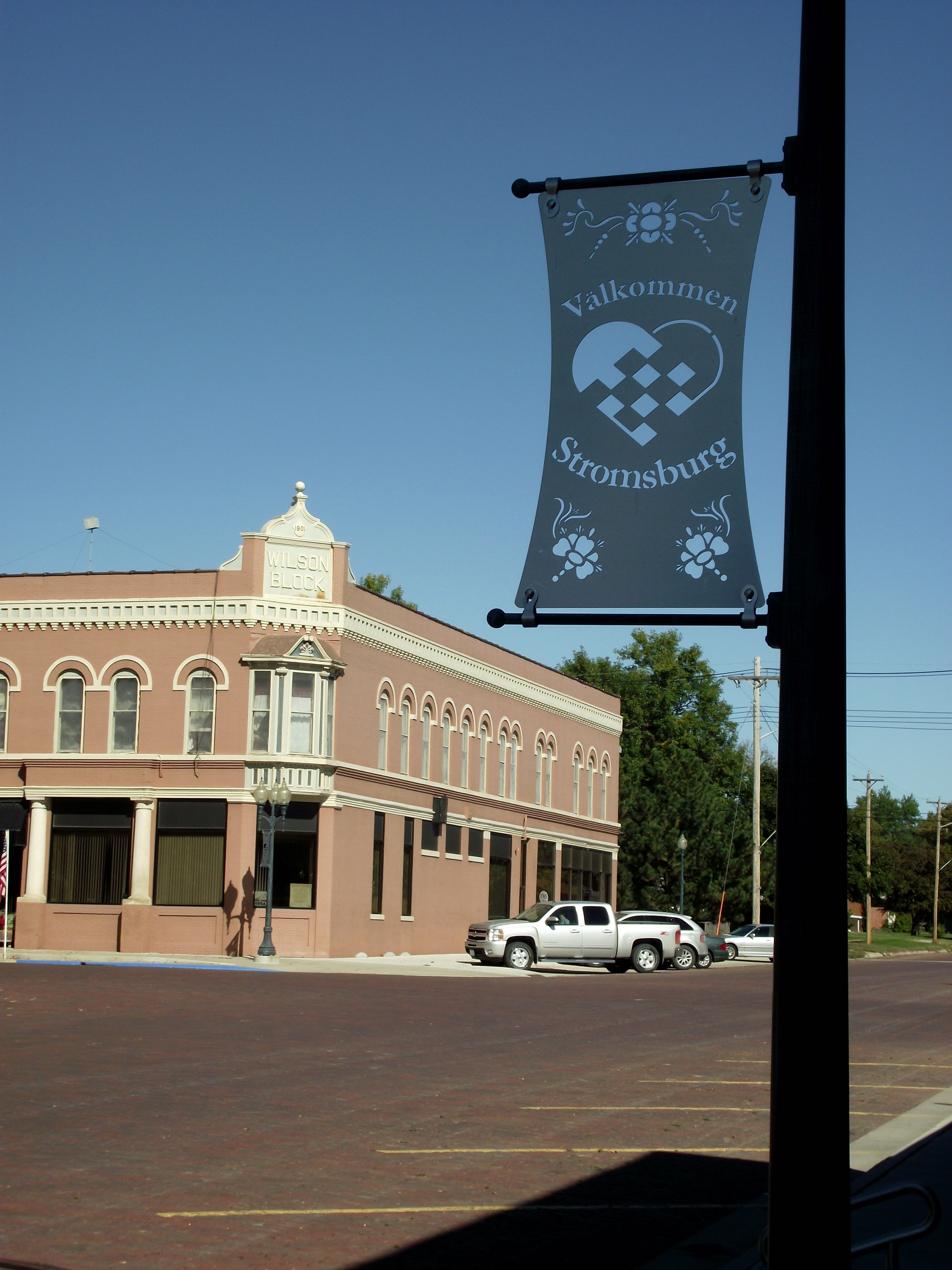
- Stromsburg brick street and Välkommen sign, September 2011

- Nickname: Swede Capital of Nebraska
- Location in the state of Nebraska, USA
- Coordinates: 41°06′57″N 97°35′28″W
- Country: United States
- State: Nebraska
- County: Polk

Government
  - Mayor: Ken Everingham

Area
  - Total: 1.03 sq mi (2.66 km^{2})
  - Land: 1.02 sq mi (2.65 km^{2})
  - Water: 0 sq mi (0.00 km^{2})
- Elevation: 1,680 ft (510 m)

Population (2020)
  - Total: 1,143
  - Density: 1,116/sq mi (430.7/km^{2})
- Time zone: UTC-6 (CST)
  - Summer (DST): UTC-5 (CDT)
- ZIP code: 68666
- Area code: 402
- FIPS code: 31-47465
- GNIS feature ID: 2395988
- Website: www.stromsburgnebraska.com

Stromsburg is a city in Polk County, Nebraska, United States. The population was 1,028 as per the 2020 census.

== History ==
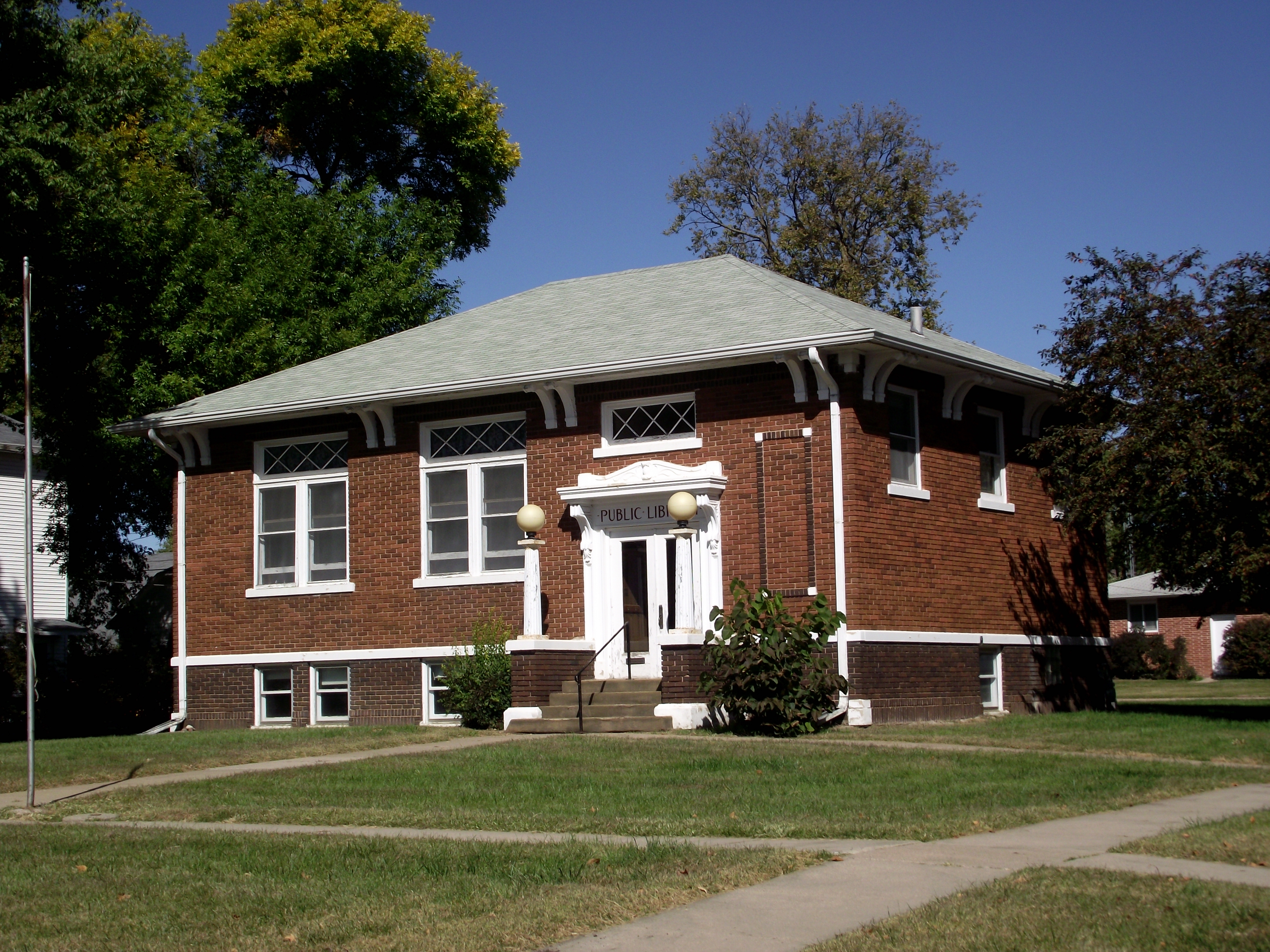
Stromsburg Library, September 2011

Stromsburg was settled early in Nebraska history. A group of Swedish settlers from the town of Ockelbo arrived in the 1860s after several years in Illinois. This group was led by Lewis Headstrom, who was a real estate agent. Seeing some similarities to their old Swedish homeland the settlers formed what would be called Stromsburg, named after a section of Ockelbo, Sweden. By the 1880s, two brickyards were in operation in the town. Many buildings constructed of ‘native’ brick still stand, including the Viking Center, now a community center that was originally The Opera House; the Cornerstone Bank; two businesses on the east side of the square; and several homes. Brick streets still surround the city square in Stromsburg. A brick Carnegie library was built in Stromsburg in 1918. The downtown area of Stromsburg has a town square in its center. This square forms a park, with lawns and mature trees, where festivals and events are held. In the center of the square is a two-story Swedish style building made of brick with decorative toll painting and the phrase "Välkommen" (Swedish for "Welcome").

Stromsburg was given the title of the “Swede Capital of Nebraska” by Governor Frank B. Morrison in 1966 at the Swedish Festival. The Swedish festival is held in June each year and showcases Stromburg's Swedish heritage.

Stromsburg Public School was established in 1887. It operated until 2002, when the Stromsburg district consolidated with Benedict, Nebraska to form Cross County Community School.

== Geography ==
According to the United States Census Bureau, the city has a total area of 1.01 square miles (2.62 km^{2}), all land.

== Swedish Festival ==
Every summer, Stromsburg holds its weekend-long Swedish Festival, a celebration of the town's Swedish heritage. Traditional Swedish foods are prepared and sold in Grandma's Kitchen, and the Stromsburg Public Library hosts events that deal with genealogy and Swedish heritage. Craft shows and live Viking demonstrations are staged.

== Demographics ==
Historical population
| Census | Pop. | Note | %± |
|---|---|---|---|
| 1900 | 1,154 | | — |
| 1910 | 1,355 | | 17.4% |
| 1920 | 1,361 | | 0.4% |
| 1930 | 1,320 | | −3.0% |
| 1940 | 1,127 | | −14.6% |
| 1950 | 1,231 | | 9.2% |
| 1960 | 1,244 | | 1.1% |
| 1970 | 1,215 | | −2.3% |
| 1980 | 1,290 | | 6.2% |
| 1990 | 1,241 | | −3.8% |
| 2000 | 1,232 | | −0.7% |
| 2010 | 1,171 | | −5.0% |
| 2020 | 1,143 | | −2.4% |
U.S. Decennial Census

=== 2010 census ===
At the 2010 census, there were 1,171 people in 457 households, including 310 families, in the city. The population density was 1,159.4 inhabitants per square mile (447.6/km^{2}). There were 533 housing units at an average density of 527.7 per square mile (203.7/km^{2}). The racial makup of the city was 97.3% White, 0.4% African American, 0.2% Native American, 0.3% Asian, 0.3% from other races, and 1.6% from two or more races. Hispanic or Latino of any race were 1.4%.

Of the 457 households 29.8% had children under the age of 18 living with them, 57.8% were married couples living together, 6.6% had a female householder with no husband present, 3.5% had a male householder with no wife present, and 32.2% were non-families. 29.5% of households were one person and 16.6% were one person aged 65 or older. The average household size was 2.39 and the average family size was 2.93.

The median age was 46.4 years. 25% of residents were under the age of 18; 4% were between the ages of 18 and 24; 19.7% were from 25 to 44; 23.3% were from 45 to 64; and 27.9% were 65 or older. The gender makeup of the city was 47.9% male and 52.1% female.

=== 2000 census ===
At the 2000 census, there were 1,232 people in 487 households, including 320 families, in the city. The population density was 1,214.2 inhabitants per square mile (468.8/km^{2}). There were 533 housing units at an average density of 525.3 per square mile (202.8/km^{2}). The racial makup of the city was 99.19% White, 0.08% Native American, 0.08% Asian, 0.16% from other races, and 0.49% from two or more races. 0.65%. were Hispanic or Latino of any race.

Of the 487 households 27.1% had children under the age of 18 living with them, 59.1% were married couples living together, 4.3% had a female householder with no husband present, and 34.1% were non-families. 31.8% of households were one person and 19.9% were one person aged 65 or older. The average household size was 2.32 and the average family size was 2.92.

The age distribution was 22.9% under the age of 18, 6.3% from 18 to 24, 20.5% from 25 to 44, 18.8% from 45 to 64, and 31.7% 65 or older. The median age was 45 years. For every 100 females, there were 92.8 males. For every 100 females age 18 and over, there were 81.0 males.

As of 2000, the median income for a household in the city was $34,250, and the median family income was $45,250. Males had a median income of $32,132 versus $18,600 for females. The per capita income for the city was $17,235. About 4.0% of families and 4.5% of the population were below the poverty line, including 2.9% of those under the age of 18 and 3.5% of those 65 and older.

== Government ==
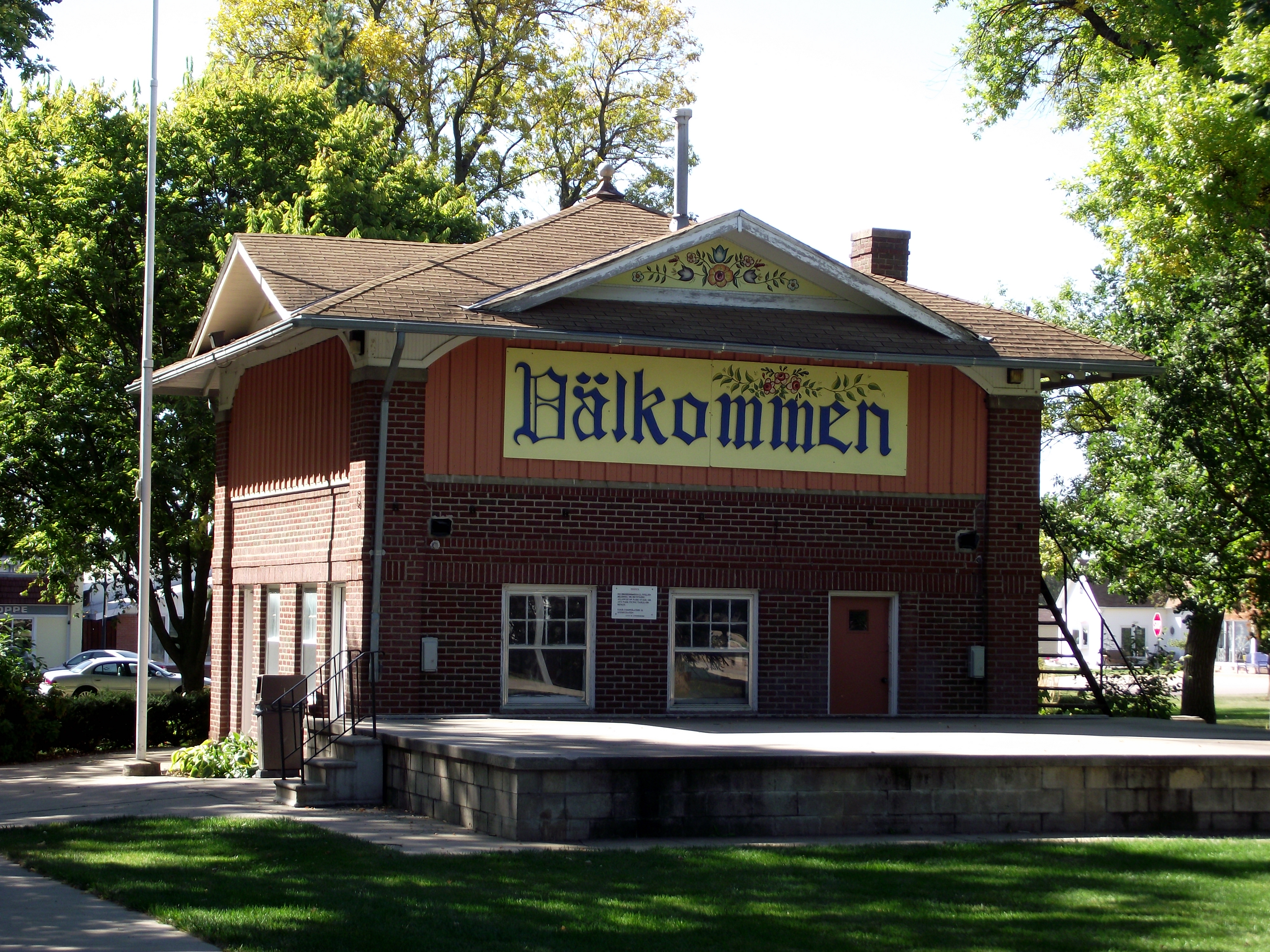
Center of Stromsburg town square, September 2011

Stromsburg is governed by Mayor Ken Everingham and a four-member city council.

== Notable people ==
- Lynn Boden, professional football player
- George Flippin MD, doctor and American football player
- Idael Makeever, poet
- Charles Henry Morrill, businessman; Morrill County, Nebraska was named after him

== See also ==
- List of municipalities in Nebraska
