= Ida May Davis =

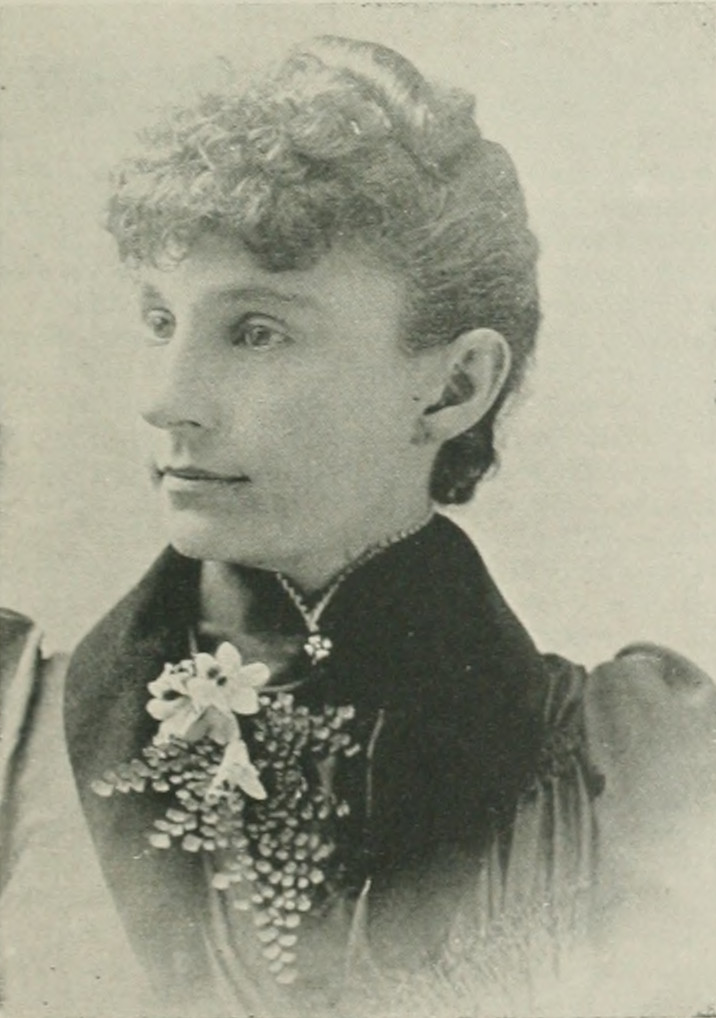
- Born: February 22, 1857; Lafayette, Indiana
- Died: Unknown
- Occupation: Writer

Ida May De Puy Davis (born February 22, 1857) was a litterateur.

== Early life ==
Ida May De Puy was born in Lafayette, Indiana, on February 22, 1857. Her father was of French descent, and from him Davis inherited her humor and vivacity.

Her poetic inclinations and talents showed themselves at an early age. She has always been a facile versifier, and her thoughts naturally flow in rhyme.

== Career ==
When Ida May Davis was seventeen years old, she began to publish poems, all of which were extensively copied and commended. Her productions appeared in newspapers and magazines of the Central and Rocky Mountain States. Her poems were mainly lyrical in form.

She was a member of the Western Association of Writers, founded in 1886, and she was conspicuous in the annals of that society, which she served as secretary.

She was an artist of much talent and painted well.

She was a teacher and was a member of the School Board of Terre Haute, having been elected in 1891. She was the first woman to serve in this capacity in Indiana.

== Personal life ==
Ida May De Puy married Henry Clay Davis, of southern birth, in 1876. They lived in Terre Haute, Indiana, where she was the center of a circle of literary and artistic persons.
