= Minnie Thomas Boyce =

American writer (1870–1929)

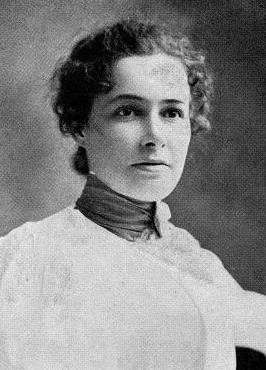
- Minnie Thomas Boyce, from a 1902 publication
- Born: Minnie May Thomas; 1870; Fortville, Indiana
- Died: December 19, 1929 (aged 58–59); Cleveland, Ohio

Minnie Thomas Boyce (born Minnie May Thomas, 1870 – December 19, 1929) was an American writer.

== Early life ==
She was born in Fortville, Indiana, the daughter of Charles Perrine Thomas and Nancy Jane Humphries Thomas. She took courses in English at Indiana University.

== Career ==
Boyce wrote poetry and short stories which appeared in many American periodicals in the 1890s and 1900s, including the "Punkin' Holler" tales in Chicago's Inter Ocean. "Humorous sketches and stories of Hoosier life are specially Mrs. Boyce's forte, although her poems for children are eagerly sought for," commented one reporter in 1893. A play by Boyce, The Hennypeckles, was performed in Muncie in 1908, and in Alexandria and Yorktown in 1909.

Boyce also gave speaking recitations, taught oratory, and wrote opinion pieces for newspapers. On divorce, she wrote, "It seems to me that there could be nothing more terrible, more barbarous, than for the law or any other institution to compel two people to live together all their lives who are utterly separated in mind and taste and devotedness." She was active in the Western Association of Writers and the Indiana Writers' Association.

== Personal life ==
Minnie Thomas married Charles Wilson Boyce in 1889. They had a son, James G. Boyce, and lived in Muncie, Indiana. Her husband, who managed an electric light plant, died in 1896, and she died in 1929, aged 59 years, in Cleveland, Ohio.
