= M. Sears Brooks =

American poet and author (1830–1893)

- Born: 1830 Springfield, Massachusetts, U.S.
- Died: November 3, 1893 (aged 62–63)
- Occupation: Poet; author

M. Sears Brooks (1830 – November 3, 1893) was an American poet and author.

== Early life ==
Marie Sears Brooks was born in 1830 in Springfield, Massachusetts. She was of English ancestry, descended from the Tuttles, of Hertfordshire, England, who settled in New Haven, Connecticut, in 1635, upon the tract of land now occupied by Yale College, part of which tract remained the family homestead for more than a century. She was of Revolutionary stock, her grandfather being one of Mad Anthony Wayne's picked men at the Battle of Stony Point.

Her family was remarkable for strong religious inclination and high regard for education and culture. Some of the most noted names in American letters descended from this stock. Among them are Presidents Timothy Dwight IV, Theodore Dwight Woolsey and Timothy Dwight V, of Yale, Henry Prescott, the historian, Samuel Griswold Goodrich aka Peter Parley, and many others.

Brooks received her education in the public and private schools of her native city.

== Career ==
M. Sears Brooks' earliest contributions to the press appeared in eastern publications under a pen-name. Latterly her poems, essays and short stories appeared over her own name in newspapers and magazines in various cities. She was engaged in regular newspaper work in southern Indiana, as editor and contributor.

The advancement of women was a subject claiming her attention, and she held the office of press superintendent for the State under the Indiana Woman Suffrage Association.

Brooks partook in the family characteristics, and in associations of both State and Nation, her aid and influence was recognized. In her literary work she showed force and beauty of diction, originality of thought and clearness of perception.

She published in holiday form "A Vision of the Mistletoe" (Buffalo, 1888).

She was named secretary and vice-president of the Western Association of Writers.

== Personal life ==
After her marriage M. Sears Brooks moved to Missouri, in 1859, and subsequently to Madison, Indiana, in 1863.

She died after a short illness of pneumonia on November 1, 1893.
