= Minnetta Theodora Taylor =

American poet

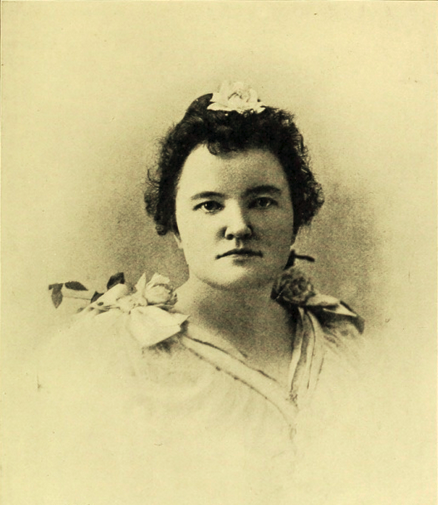
- Photo in Poets and poetry of Indiana, ca. 1900
- Born: March 2, 1860; Princeton, Missouri, U.S.
- Died: July 26, 1911 (aged 51); Greencastle, Indiana, U.S.
- Education: Asbury University (now, DePauw University)
- Occupations: author, educator, clubwoman, suffragist
- Writing career
- Genres: poetry, songs, essays, textbooks
- Notable work: "Ballot Song of American Women"

Signature
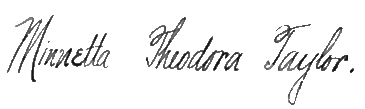

Minnetta Theodora Taylor (March 2, 1860 - July 26, 1911) was an American author and poet of the long nineteenth century. A polyglot, Taylor spoke 45 languages. She was also a clubwoman and suffragist. Shortly after Taylor's death in 1911, the Woman Suffrage Party post-humously awarded her the prize for the best poem, "Ballot Song of American Women", to be set to music and to become the National Suffrage Anthem. Among her intimate friends were the writers, James Whitcomb Riley, Lew Wallace, George Ade, Wilbur D. Nesbitt, Rex Beach, and Bliss Carman; Opie Read called her "The Little Sister of Poets".

== Biography ==
Minnetta Theodora Taylor was born in Princeton, Missouri, March 2, 1860. (Note: According to Coggeshall (1860), Taylor was born in the state of Illinois. According to Miller (2019), Taylor was born in the year 1859.) She had at least two siblings, brothers, John and Howard.

When she entered Asbury University (now, DePauw University), age thirteen, her German was through the course, and in mathematics, she had finished the sophomore year. During her college course, she received first honor in modern languages, first Latin prize, and highest general grades. She graduated with A. B. degree; A. M. French, 1883–84; she also attended 1898–99.

For a time, she taught Romance languages in DePauw, but she abandoned this work to enter the lecture field. In 1905, she was delivering lectures in New York City and Boston on literary and sociological subjects.

Taylor spoke 45 languages, and was joint author of six Spanish-English textbooks, her associate being Mr. Biragua, of New York City. She contributed to Spanish-American periodicals and general literature. Taylor also wrote critical papers and essays.

Taylor was widely known in club circles, being either an active or honorary member of thirty clubs, several of them being in foreign countries. In 1903, she was president both of the Western Association of Writers and the Indiana Federation of Women's Clubs. Previously, she was president of the DePauw Society of Alumni. Governor Durbin appointed her to represent Indiana in the American Forest Congress meeting in Washington D.C.

Taylor died at her home in Greencastle, Indiana, July 26, 1911.

== Suffrage ==
Taylor was the founder of the Greencastle, Indiana suffrage club.

In May 1911, when 3,000 suffragists and suffragettes of New York marched for 5 miles (8.0 km) down Fifth Avenue, the parade was witnessed from the Waldorf-Astoria by a noted Italian composer. He was profoundly impressed and approached the leaders stating that it was a grand parade but what was missing was a grand anthem. He would write an impassioned anthem if someone would give him the words. The Woman Suffrage Party of New York advertised for a poem to be set to music for the National Suffrage Anthem. A prize of US$100 was offered. Authors from every state in the U.S. sent in poems, which were judged by a committee who were not permitted to know the authors. The prize was awarded to Taylor who died five days after writing the poem, "Ballot Song of American Women", in five stanzas, the first of which is:—

Once more awakes the spirit of the just
And a world-wide flame is kindled from the dust.
Women, for the right we know,
For the duty that we owe,
For all souls now here and coming, vote we must.
CHORUS
We the People! All the People! How it rings!
Justice broad and free, the living hearts of things!
Sisters working for the light,
Brothers striving for the right,
We the People! All the People! How it rings!

The song was first performed at the party's convention in Carnegie Hall, October 26, 1911.

== Selected works ==
- "Ballot Song of American Women", words by Minnetta Theodora Taylor, music by Fred B. King, Dec. 20, 1911; Jerome H. Co., New York.
