= Idael Makeever =

American journalist

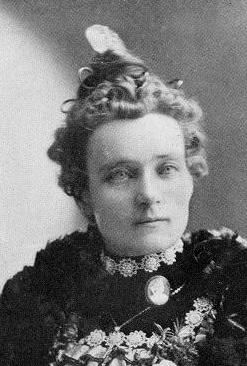
- Idael Makeever, from a 1902 publication.
- Born: December 7, 1867; Porter County, Indiana, U.S.
- Died: August 23, 1954 (aged 86); Loveland, Colorado, U.S.
- Other names: Ida E. Childers, Ida Makeever
- Occupations: Poet; songwriter; journalist; clubwoman

Idael Childers Makeever (December 7, 1867 – August 23, 1954) was an American poet, songwriter, journalist and clubwoman.

== Early life ==
Idael Childers was born in 1867, in Porter County, Indiana, and educated in Valparaiso, the daughter of George Childers and Tryphena Ida Childers. Her father was a businessman, and her mother was born in Canada. After she was married and had two children in Nebraska, she returned to Indiana to take courses at Valparaiso University.

== Career ==
Makeever taught school in Indiana for several years as a young woman. She published two books of her poetry: Prairie Flowers and Meadow Grasses (1889) and Golden Rod and Dialect Poems (1898). She read her poem "Nebraska" at the Trans-Mississippi Exposition in Omaha, in 1898. Makeever's poem "I'm Going Home" was included in a 1902 collection of Indiana writers' works. "She took up the unsung themes of the West," commented one profile in 1902. "In the broad prairies," noted another, "her poetic nature blossomed and flowered, and the notes of her songs mingled with the music of the meadowlark." Makeever was an active member of the Western Association of Writers.

Makeever also wrote song lyrics, including "The Dream Face" (1909, music by Blanche M. Tice). During World War I, she worked as a reporter for Omaha newspapers. During World War II, she was a newspaper columnist in Colorado, and worked at Hill Air Force Base in Utah.

== Personal life ==
Idael Makeever married lawyer and mining executive Milton Alexander Makeever in 1889; with him, she moved to Stromsburg, Nebraska, where their two daughters, Merle and Iva Lee, were born in 1889 and 1894. She moved to Boulder, Colorado in 1902, while her husband was working at a gold mine in Mexico. She was widowed in 1940, and she died in 1954, aged 86 years, in Loveland, Colorado. Her papers are archived at Valparaiso University in Indiana.
