= Iddings-Gilbert-Leader-Anderson Block =

- U.S. National Register of Historic Places
- U.S. Historic district – Contributing property
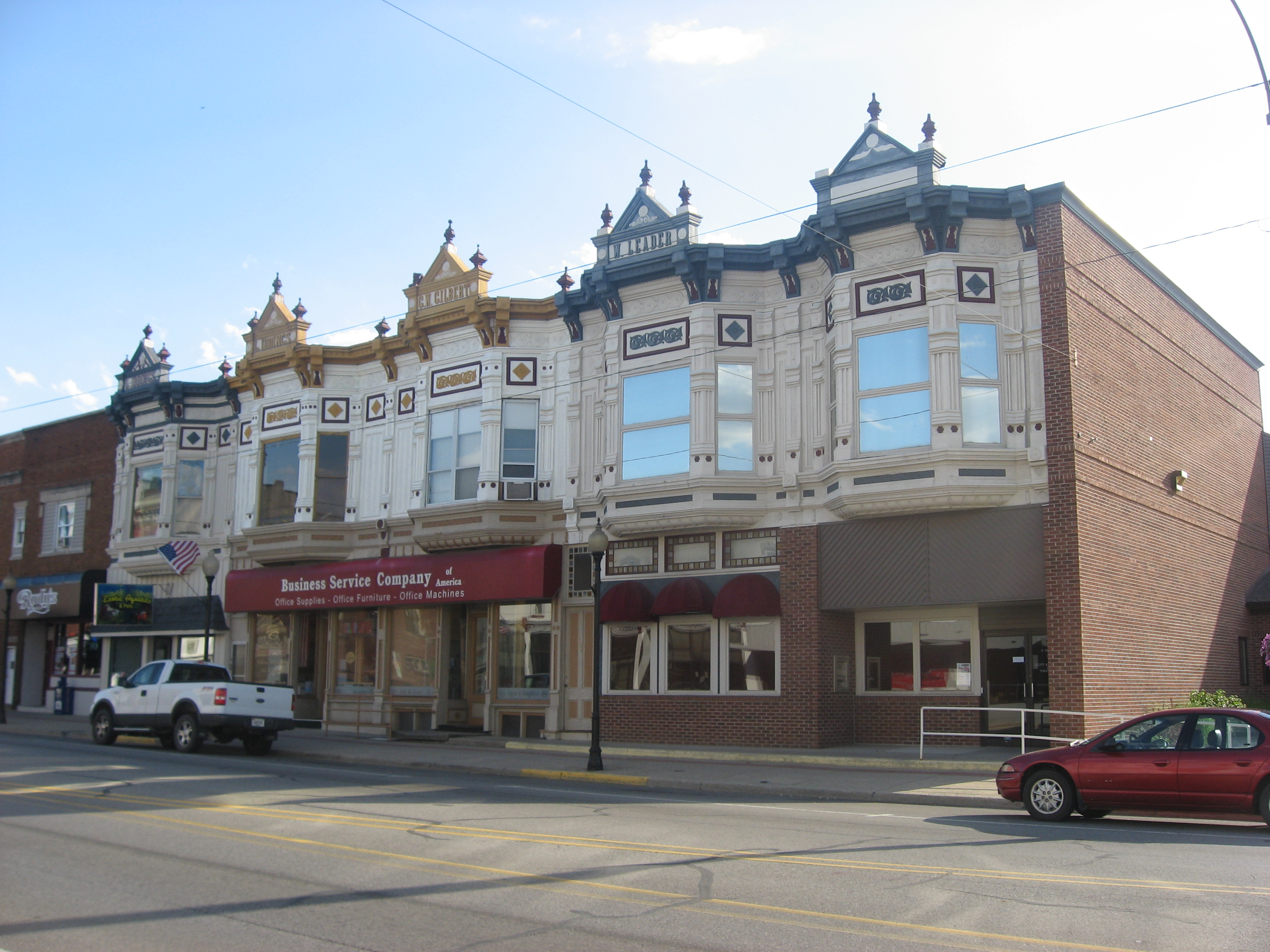
- Iddings-Gilbert-Leader-Anderson Block, May 2012

- Location within Indiana Location within the United States
- Location: 105-113 N. Main St., Kendallville, Indiana
- Coordinates: 41°26′39″N 85°15′58″W
- Area: less than one acre
- Built: 1891-1895
- Architectural style: Queen Anne
- NRHP reference No.: 87000544
- Added to NRHP: July 21, 1987

Iddings-Gilbert-Leader-Anderson Block is a row of five connected historic commercial buildings located at Kendallville, Indiana. The block was built between 1891 and 1895, and is a two-story, red brick building with pressed metal facades in the Queen Anne style.

It was listed on the National Register of Historic Places in 1987. It is located in the Kendallville Downtown Historic District.
