= Marie Louise Andrews =

American short story writer, journalist, editor

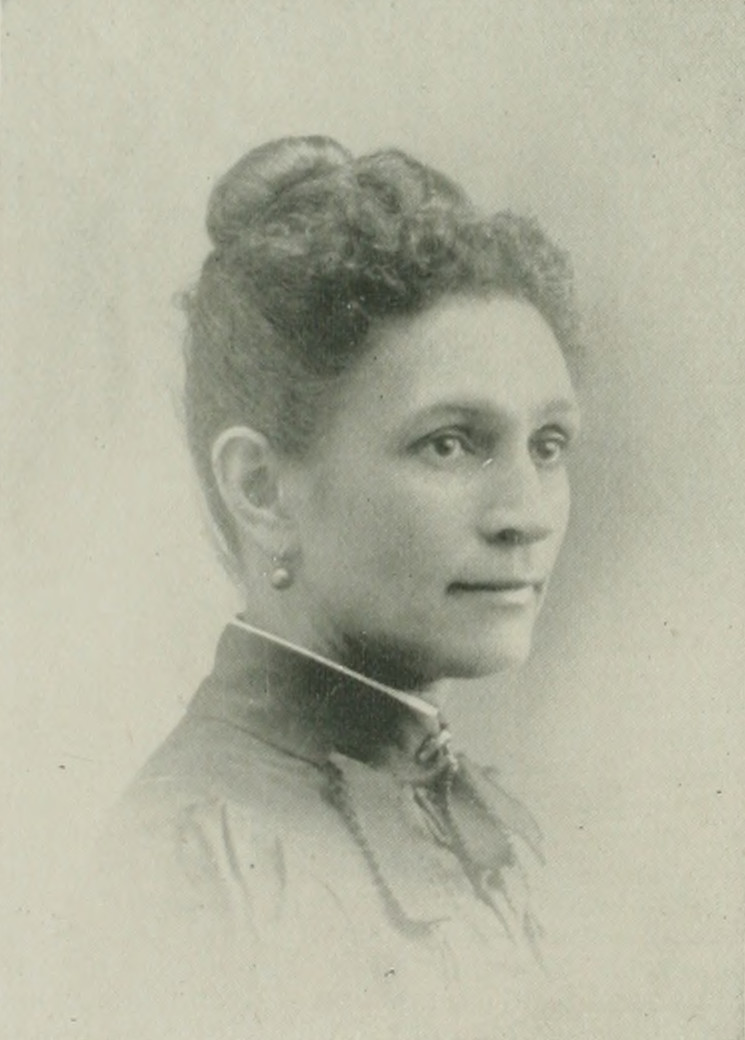
- Photo in A Woman of the Century
- Born: Mary Louise Newland; October 31, 1849; Bedford, Indiana, US
- Died: February 7, 1891 (aged 41); Connersville, Indiana, US
- Education: Saint Mary-of-the-Woods, Hungerford Collegiate Institute
- Occupations: Author, editor
- Spouse: Albert M. Andrews
- Writing career
- Genres: Poems, essays, sketches
- Notable works: Co-founder, Western Association of Writers

Marie Louise Andrews (née, Newland; October 31, 1849 – February 7, 1891) was an American author and editor from Indiana. She was a founder of the Western Association of Writers, and served as its secretary from its founding until June 1888, when she retired. She was prolific in both verse and prose, but she never published her works in book form, and little of her work has been preserved.

== Early life and education ==
Mary (later "Marie") Louise Newland was born in Bedford, Indiana, on October 31, 1849. She was the second daughter of Dr. Benjamin Franklin Newland (1821–1889) and Louisa Ann (Curry) Newland, who were educated and considered to be intellectuals. Her early life was spent in Bedford, where she was mainly educated in private schools. She was a student at Saint Mary-of-the-Woods, in St. Agnes' Hall, Terre Haute, Indiana, and at Hungerford Collegiate Institute, Adams, New York, which was destroyed by fire shortly before commencement, so that Andrews was not formally graduated. Andrews spoke French and German, and was familiar with Latin and modern language literature.

== Career ==
In the winter of 1885–86, while working as an editor at the Indianapolis Herald, Andrews and other contributors to the paper, including John C. Ochiltree, Dr. James Newton Matthews, Richard Lew Dawson, and Dr. Henry William Taylor, became the founders of the Western Association of Writers movement, discussing the idea of a writers’ association publicly through the Herald's columns. Andrews, a co-founder of the association, served as its secretary from its organization until June, 1888, when she retired from the office. Among her acquaintances were many of the prominent writers of the Western United States, and at the annual conventions of the association, she was always a conspicuous member. She was also remembered as a brilliant conversationalist and an effective impromptu speaker.

The Western Association of Writers owed its organization and establishment largely to Andrews' efforts. Andrews was not an author in the technical sense of having written a book, yet she gained a reputation as a ready and versatile writer of poems, essays, and sketches, contributing to various periodical publications. Her interest in literary work was broader than a purely personal matter. The development of western literature, and its recognition by the country and the world at large, had been on her mind for some time before she was given the opportunity to demonstrate the practicability of her ideas in the association with which her name was closely identified. She foresaw the growth of literature in the west, and her ideas regarding that growth and of the best means of fostering it were embodied in the association. It served as a means of introducing scores of writers to the public. She was one of the most active promoters of the organization in its inception, and was one of its friends through the years when its continuance seemed questionable.

== Personal life ==
On May 15, 1875, she married Albert M. Andrews, then of North Vernon, Indiana. Soon afterwards, they moved to Connersville, Indiana where he worked in the pharmaceutical business. She was in Indianapolis for several winters, supervising the education of her son, Albert Charlton Andrews, who was her only child.

Marie Louise Andrews died at Connersville on February 7, 1891.

== "Compensation" ==
There are smiles in the morning and tears at night,
The wide world over,
There are hopes in the morning and prayers at night
For many a rover.

There are tears unwept and songs unsung,
And human anguish keen,
And hopes and fears and smiles and tears,
But the blessings fall between!
