= Cross County Community School =

School district in Nebraska, United States

Coordinates: 41°04′41″N 97°36′11″W

Cross County Community Schools

Location
- Rural Polk County, Nebraska

Information
- Established: 2002
- Grades: Pre K-12
- Color(s): Navy Blue, Silver and White

Cross County Community School District is a consolidated school district in Polk County, Nebraska, United States. In 2002, the communities of Benedict and Stromsburg consolidated their school districts to form Cross County Public Schools. The school's team mascot is the Cougar. The current K-12 school building was built three miles south of Stromsburg and five miles north of Benedict, at the intersection of U.S. Route 81 and Nebraska Highway 66, being completed in late 2009. The district's mailing address is in Stromsburg.

== Sports and Extracurricular activities ==
Cross County currently offers basketball, track and field, golf, wrestling, and weights for boys and the same for girls, except for football. During football season, girls have the option of volleyball or softball. For wrestling we consolidate with Osceola High School to form CCO Twisters, for softball, we consolidate with Osceola High School and High Plains Community Schools to form Polk County Slammers.

Cross County offers FCCLA, National Honors Society, Quizbowl, Robotics, FFA, FBLA, FCA, Skills USA, dance, theater, band, choir, and speech as the main extracurricular activities
