= Kendallville Downtown Historic District =

Historic district in Indiana, United States

- U.S. National Register of Historic Places
- U.S. Historic district
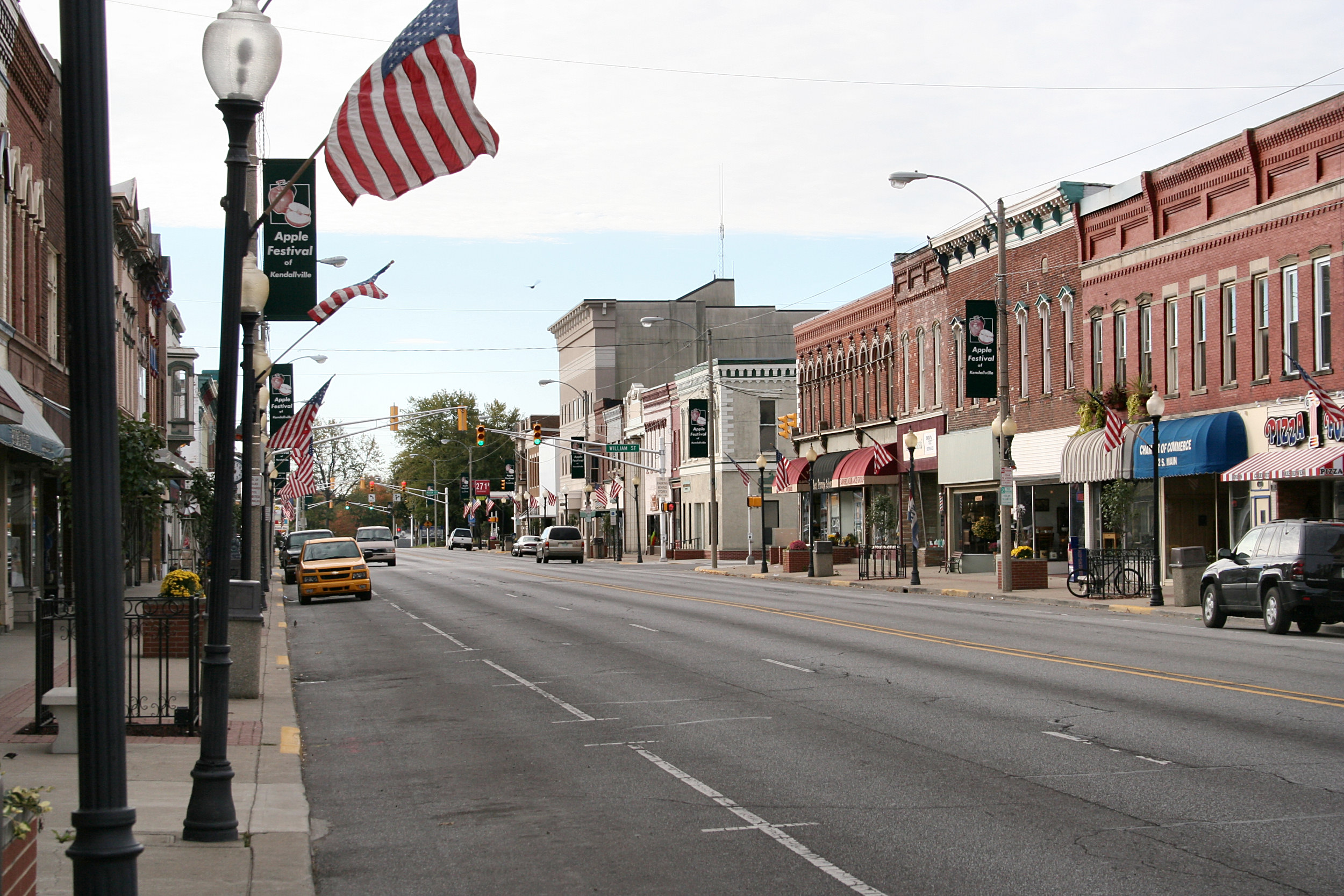
- Kendallville Downtown Historic District, October 2005

- Location within Indiana Location within the United States
- Location: Roughly bounded by Harris and Rush Sts., the alleys E and W of Main, Kendallville, Indiana
- Coordinates: 41°26′35″N 85°15′55″W
- Area: 10 acres (4.0 ha)
- Built: 1880
- Architectural style: Italianate, Queen Anne, et al.
- NRHP reference No.: 03001315
- Added to NRHP: December 23, 2003

Kendallville Downtown Historic District is a national historic district located at Kendallville, Indiana. The district encompasses 45 contributing buildings in the central business district of Kendallville. It developed between about 1863 and 1940, and includes notable examples of Italianate, Queen Anne, Romanesque Revival, Classical Revival, and Bungalow / American Craftsman style architecture. Located in the district is the separately listed Iddings-Gilbert-Leader-Anderson Block. Other notable buildings include the City Hall (1914), Diggins Building (1892), Masonic Hall Building (c. 1865), and Bernhalter Building (c. 1910).

It was listed on the National Register of Historic Places in 2003.
