= Angeline Teal =

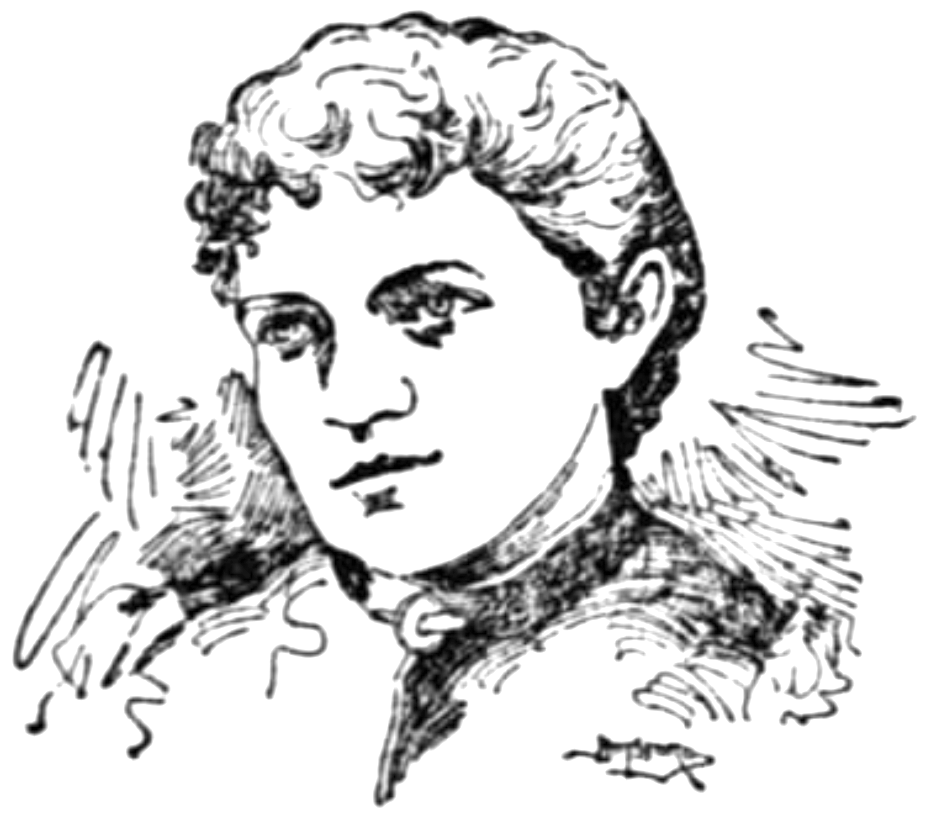
- Teal in 1892
- Born: Angeline Gruey; August 28, 1842 Wooster, Ohio, U.S.
- Died: September 3, 1913 (aged 71) Kendallville, Indiana, U.S.
- Occupation: Writer
- Genre: Poetry; novels; short stories
- Spouse: Norman Teal (m. 1866)
- Children: 3

Angeline Teal (1842–1913) was an American writer of the long nineteenth century whose diverse works included poems, novels, and short stories. She drew her literary material mainly from Indiana life. Her subjects were of interest to young people, particularly to boys.

== Early life and education ==
Angeline Gruey was born on a farm in Wooster, Ohio, August 28, 1842. Her parents were Mr. and Mrs. Joseph Gruey, early settlers of DeKalb County, Indiana. Angeline had at least one sibling, a brother, C. J.

All of her grandparents were foreign-born. On her mother's side, they were German, Ingold by name. Her father's father, Nicholas Gruey, was a Dane. A government appointment took him to Paris, where, in 1793, be married a French woman named Margaret Delcore. They emigrated to Virginia, where, early in the 19th century, her father, Joseph Gruey, was born.

When she was three years old, her parents removed to a farm in Noble County, Indiana, where she grew up, receiving her education in the common schools and at Miss Griggs' Seminary, at Wolcottville, Indiana.

She didn't remember the age at which she first began to scribble, rhymes being her earliest attempts.

== Career ==
John W. Dawson, of the Fort Wayne Times, was the first to publish Teal's poetical effusions. After the experience of seeing her name in print, she wrote a great deal. During the civil war, she wrote poem after poem for the Chicago Tribune; some of these were widely copied. One, on the re-election of Abraham Lincoln in 1864, called forth a congratulatory letter from George P. Upton. Another, still earlier, sent to the New-York Tribune, brought her a letter from Bayard Taylor. Almost none of her early work was preserved. Her first payment ever received for literary work was US$50, paid by the Chicago Tribune for a carrier's New Year's address, written for the paper in 1865 and 1866. In the early 1890s, the New York Examiner published two of her short stories, "Basil" and "On the Border of the Bad Lands".

After her marriage, in 1866, her literary work was chiefly in the line of short stories, and it is as a story writer that she received special attention. She contributed to the Atlantic Monthly, Harper's Magazine, Harper's Weekly, Harper's Young People, Cosmopolitan, Wide Awake, Boston Traveller, and others. Occasionally, her articles appeared in daily papers, and she wrote for McClure Newspaper Syndicate.

She also published four volumes. In 1884, Lee & Shepard, Boston, bought and published her novel, John Thorn's Folks. (Note: The Boston Public Library's 1893 Catalogue credits the author of John Thorn's Folks as, "Angelina Teal, pseudo.".) She had success with this work and other writings for young people. Later novels included Muriel Howe; The Speaker of the House, which gave her a national reputation; and The Rose of Love. She was a member of the Western Association of Writers, and took interest in the intellectual development of the state of Indiana.

Teal was a leader in local club work.

== Style and themes ==
Teal's literary style was described as unpretentious and pleasing. She did not indulge in "fine writing." Her narrative was clear and straightforward, objective and analytical. In one sense she is realistic, dealing as she did with the occurrences of everyday life and with commonplace people, but the realism did not run to trivialities on the one hand or to coarseness on the other. The stories which treat of the home affairs of ordinary people were the ones apt to meet with the wide approval of the reading public. The pictures in them were familiar to the multitude.

Teal had a faculty of touching upon the subjects of interest to young people, particularly to boys. In one tale, she described a series of adventures of a boy who fell into the hands of a gang of horse-thieves and counterfeiters that infested northern Indiana and had their hiding places in the remote recesses of tho forests. She drew her literary material mainly from Indiana life.

Or of the best of Teal's short stories, printed in the Atlantic Monthly, was entitled "Mining for a Mastodon" and its scenes were also located in northern Indiana. "Mr. Bash's' Little Scheme" was an amusing bit of Dakota Territory life. "Riparian Kights", in an issue of the Boston publication, Two Tales, was a California story, which showed an intimate acquaintance with local laws and customs, as well as with the ways of life among Californios.

== Personal life ==
On January 1, 1866, she married Dr. Norman Teal, a physician of Kendallville, Indiana, who had served through the civil war as a surgeon in the Union Army, and who represented Noble County in the state legislatures of 1891 and 1893. The couple had three children, Norman, Alice, and Nancy.

Teal was a charter member of the local Presbyterian church, her father being one of the organizers and first ruling elder. Later, she became affiliated with the Trinity Episcopal church.

Several months before her death, Teal suffered a stroke of paralysis and was subsequently confined to her bed. She lived at Kendallville until her death there, on September 3, 1913.

== Selected works ==
=== Novels ===
- At Plymouth Oak Farm, 1881
- John Thorn's Folks, 1884 (text)
- Muriel Howe, 1892 (text)
- The Rose of Love, 1893 (text)
- The Speaker of the House, 1894

=== Short stories ===
- "Picco", 1887
- "Mark Fenton", 1891
- "Riparian Rights", 1892 (text)
- "Basil"
- "On the Border of the Bad Lands"
- "Mining for a Mastodon"
- "Mr. Bash's' Little Scheme"
