= Kendallville, Indiana =

- City
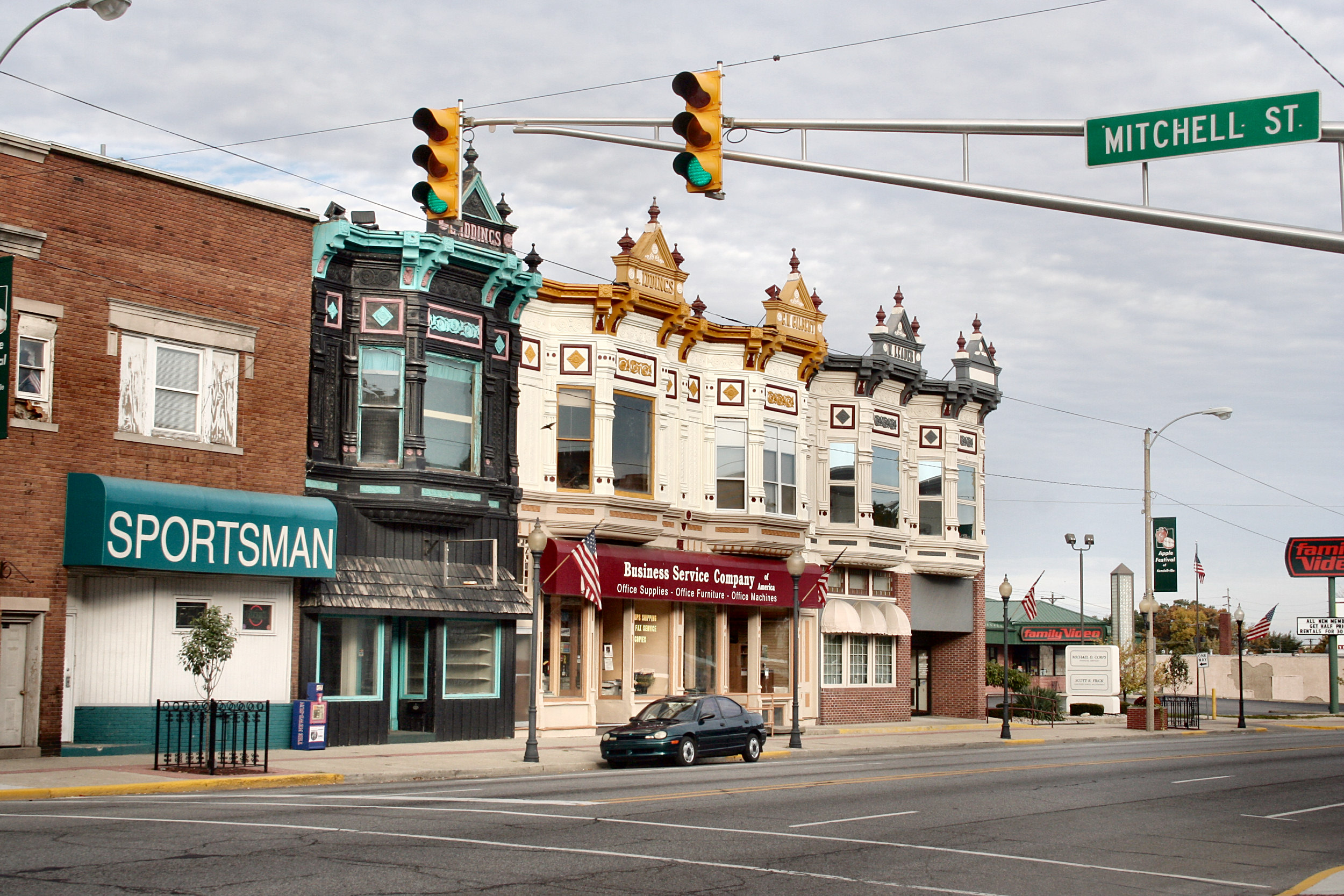
- Downtown Kendallville in October 2005.

- Seal

- Location of Kendallville in Noble County, Indiana.
- Coordinates: 41°26′36″N 85°15′23″W
- Country: United States
- State: Indiana
- County: Noble
- Township: Wayne

Government
  - Mayor: Lance L. Waters (R)

Area
  - Total: 6.34 sq mi (16.42 km^{2})
  - Land: 6.12 sq mi (15.84 km^{2})
  - Water: 0.22 sq mi (0.58 km^{2})
- Elevation: 988 ft (301 m)

Population (2020)
  - Total: 10,271
  - Density: 1,679.5/sq mi (648.47/km^{2})
- Time zone: UTC-5 (Eastern (EST))
  - Summer (DST): UTC-4 (EDT)
- ZIP code: 46755
- Area code: 260
- FIPS code: 18-39402
- GNIS feature ID: 2395505
- Website: www.kendallvillein.gov

Kendallville is a city in Wayne Township, Noble County, in the U.S. state of Indiana. The population was 10,222 as of the 2022 census.

== History ==
Kendallville was founded in 1849, and the post office had already been in operation in the area since 1837. The city was named after Amos Kendall, 8th United States Postmaster General.

The Iddings-Gilbert-Leader-Anderson Block and Kendallville Downtown Historic District are listed on the National Register of Historic Places.

=== 1992 tornado ===
On July 14, 1992, Kendallville was unexpectedly struck by a significant F2 tornado. The tornado formed on the city's west side and traveled eastward at 30 miles per hour, hitting the city's downtown area, shopping center and residential area. The tornado increased in velocity as it uprooted trees and tore down power lines, narrowly missing the Noble County fairgrounds where the county fair was being held that week. Witnesses report the tornado touched down and lifted several times throughout its life cycle.

The tornado exited the city from its east side before dissipating in Dekalb County, traveling for 8 miles and reaching a maximum path width of 150 yards. Maximum wind speeds were estimated to be 157 miles per hour, and one-inch-in-diameter hail was reported south and west of Kendallville.

The city's emergency sirens did not sound; the tornado formed so rapidly and in such close proximity to town that city officials did not get an opportunity to activate them. Additionally, weather radar failed to detect the circulation due to its relatively small width for a tornado of its intensity.

Although there were no fatalities in the storm, injuries were sustained by 28 people. 31 homes were destroyed, and damages were estimated to be in excess of $13 million.

== Geography ==
According to the 2010 census, Kendallville has a total area of 6.264 square miles (16.22 km^{2}), of which 6.04 square miles (15.64 km^{2}) (or 96.42%) is land and 0.224 square miles (0.58 km^{2}) (or 3.58%) is water.

== Demographics ==
Historical population
| Census | Pop. | Note | %± |
|---|---|---|---|
| 1870 | 2,164 | | — |
| 1880 | 2,373 | | 9.7% |
| 1890 | 2,960 | | 24.7% |
| 1900 | 3,354 | | 13.3% |
| 1910 | 4,981 | | 48.5% |
| 1920 | 5,273 | | 5.9% |
| 1930 | 5,439 | | 3.1% |
| 1940 | 5,431 | | −0.1% |
| 1950 | 6,119 | | 12.7% |
| 1960 | 6,765 | | 10.6% |
| 1970 | 6,838 | | 1.1% |
| 1980 | 7,299 | | 6.7% |
| 1990 | 7,773 | | 6.5% |
| 2000 | 9,616 | | 23.7% |
| 2010 | 9,862 | | 2.6% |
| 2020 | 10,271 | | 4.1% |
U.S. Decennial Census

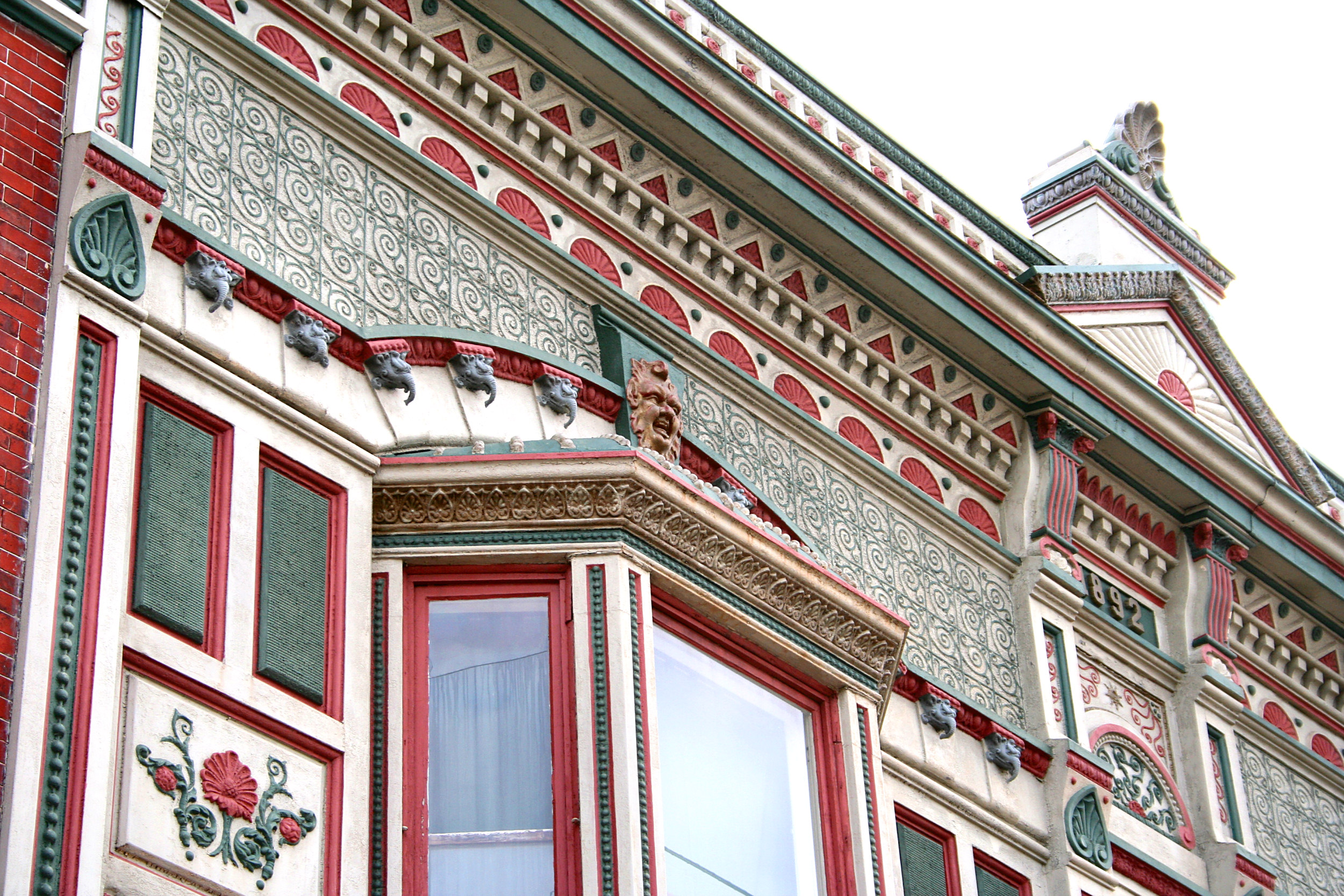
Detail of Victorian facade downtown

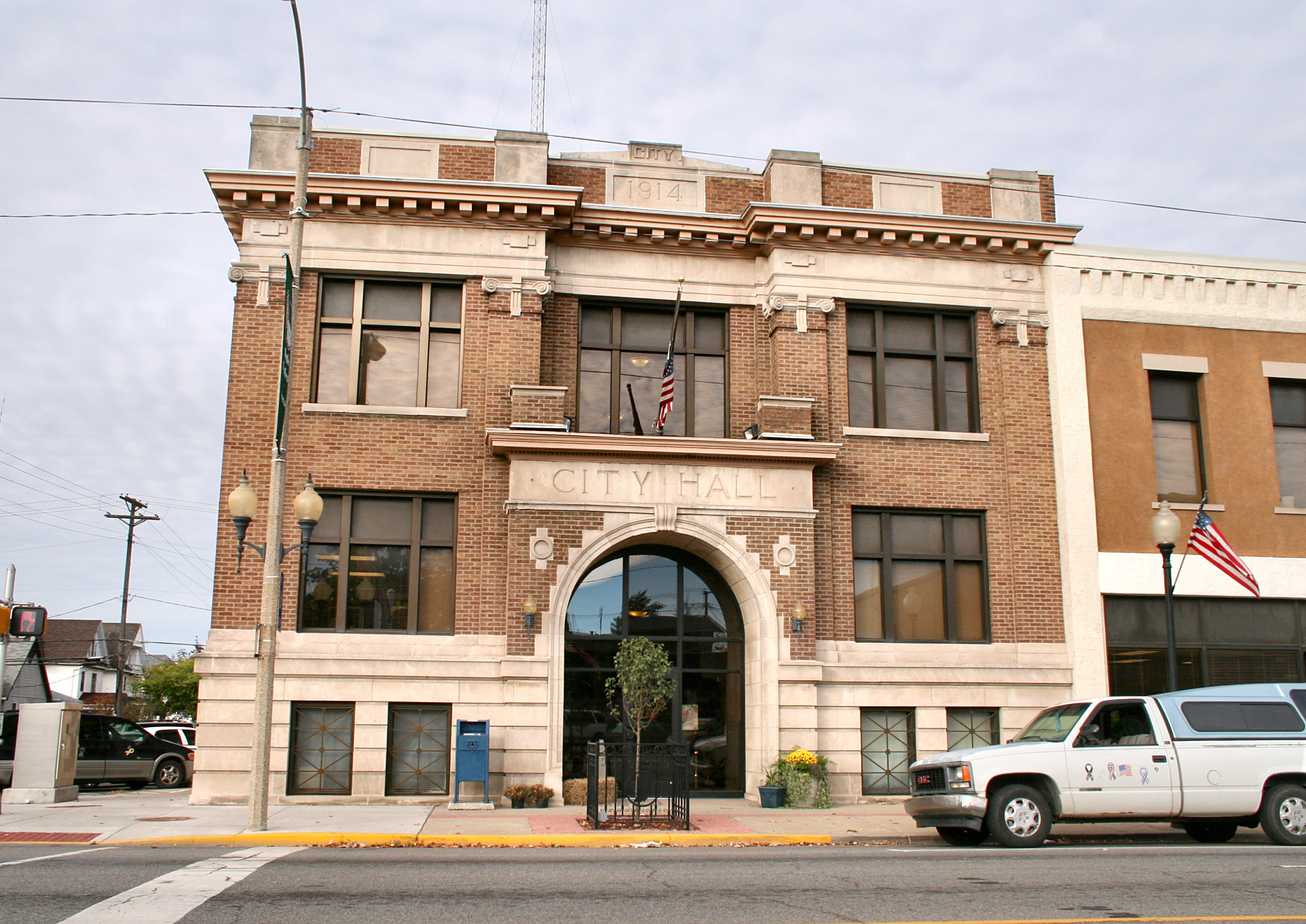
City Hall

=== 2020 census ===
As of the 2020 census, Kendallville had a population of 10,271. The median age was 36.5 years. 26.2% of residents were under the age of 18 and 16.1% of residents were 65 years of age or older. For every 100 females there were 92.4 males, and for every 100 females age 18 and over there were 87.8 males age 18 and over.

100.0% of residents lived in urban areas, while 0.0% lived in rural areas.

There were 4,103 households in Kendallville, of which 33.1% had children under the age of 18 living in them. Of all households, 38.8% were married-couple households, 19.5% were households with a male householder and no spouse or partner present, and 31.5% were households with a female householder and no spouse or partner present. About 32.0% of all households were made up of individuals and 13.4% had someone living alone who was 65 years of age or older.

There were 4,452 housing units, of which 7.8% were vacant. The homeowner vacancy rate was 1.8% and the rental vacancy rate was 7.9%.

Racial composition as of the 2020 census
| Race | Number | Percent |
|---|---|---|
| White | 9,137 | 89.0% |
| Black or African American | 72 | 0.7% |
| American Indian and Alaska Native | 42 | 0.4% |
| Asian | 73 | 0.7% |
| Native Hawaiian and Other Pacific Islander | 2 | 0.0% |
| Some other race | 246 | 2.4% |
| Two or more races | 699 | 6.8% |
| Hispanic or Latino (of any race) | 625 | 6.1% |

=== 2010 census ===
As of the census of 2010, there were 9,862 people, 3,940 households, and 2,483 families living in the city. The population density was 1,630.1 inhabitants per square mile (629.4/km^{2}). There were 4,382 housing units at an average density of 724.3 per square mile (279.7/km^{2}). The racial makeup of the city was 94.1% White, 0.5% African American, 0.2% Native American, 0.5% Asian, 2.9% from other races, and 1.8% from two or more races. Hispanic or Latino of any race were 5.1% of the population.

There were 3,940 households, of which 36.1% had children under the age of 18 living with them, 42.2% were married couples living together, 14.4% had a female householder with no husband present, 6.4% had a male householder with no wife present, and 37.0% were non-families. 31.1% of all households were made up of individuals, and 11.9% had someone living alone who was 65 years of age or older. The average household size was 2.46 and the average family size was 3.06.

The median age in the city was 34.6 years. 27.4% of residents were under the age of 18; 8.9% were between the ages of 18 and 24; 27.3% were from 25 to 44; 23.5% were from 45 to 64; and 12.9% were 65 years of age or older. The gender makeup of the city was 48.2% male and 51.8% female.

=== 2000 census ===
As of the census of 2000, there were 9,616 people, 3,873 households, and 2,459 families living in the city. The population density was 1,890.0 inhabitants per square mile (729.7/km^{2}). There were 4,172 housing units at an average density of 820.0 per square mile (316.6/km^{2}). The racial makeup of the city was 96.66% White, 0.25% African American, 0.16% Native American, 0.59% Asian, 0.01% Pacific Islander, 1.37% from other races, and 0.96% from two or more races. Hispanic or Latino of any race were 3.16% of the population.

There were 3,873 households, out of which 35.9% had children under the age of 18 living with them, 46.0% were married couples living together, 13.3% had a female householder with no husband present, and 36.5% were non-families. 31.5% of all households were made up of individuals, and 12.7% had someone living alone who was 65 years of age or older. The average household size was 2.44 and the average family size was 3.07.

In the city, the population was spread out, with 28.0% under the age of 18, 10.3% from 18 to 24, 30.1% from 25 to 44, 17.7% from 45 to 64, and 13.8% who were 65 years of age or older. The median age was 32 years. For every 100 females, there were 89.1 males. For every 100 females age 18 and over, there were 86.2 males.

The median income for a household in the city was $33,899, and the median income for a family was $42,341. Males had a median income of $33,258 versus $23,851 for females. The per capita income for the city was $16,335. About 7.9% of families and 9.9% of the population were below the poverty line, including 10.7% of those under age 18 and 8.6% of those age 65 or over.

== Annual cultural events ==
- Apple Festival
- Christmas Parade
- County Fair
- Fireworks at Bixler Lake (4 July)
- Kendallville Main Street Car Show
- The Kendallville Open
- Tri-State Bluegrass Festival

== Education ==
Schools in the Kendallville area include:

- East Noble High School
- East Noble Middle School
- South Side Elementary School
- North Side Elementary School
- Wayne Center Elementary School
- St. John Lutheran School

The town has a lending library, the Kendallville Public Library.

== Media ==
The News Sun is the city's daily newspaper; and it also covers the rest of Noble and LaGrange counties. It is the successor of the Noble County Journal, a weekly founded c. 1860, and is now owned by KPC Media Group, a chain of three dailies, three weeklies, and several monthly publications in northeastern Indiana. It has its headquarters on Main Street in Kendallville.

The Kendallville Mall newspaper and KendallvilleTV on YouTube provide local news and videos.

The Cinema Museum in London holds good home movies of Kendalville and the refrigerator factory in 1959.

== Notable people ==
- Amy Yoder Begley, middle- and long-distance runner, competed at the 2008 Summer Olympics
- Arthur Mapes, poet, born and raised in Kendallville, wrote Indiana's state poem and recognized in 1977 as the Poet Laureate for Indiana.
- David M. McIntosh, member of the U.S. House of Representatives from 1995 to 2001; Republican nominee for governor of Indiana in 2000
- Brad Miller, two-time NBA All-Star, Center; 2003 - Indiana Pacers, 2004 - Sacramento Kings, retired in 2012.
- George A. Mitchell, founder of Cadillac, Michigan
- William Mitchell, United States Representative from Indiana
- Alvin M. Strauss, architect, born to German immigrant parents in Kendallville, best known for Lincoln Bank Tower
- Angeline Teal, writer
