= Benedict, Nebraska =

Village in York County, Nebraska, United States

- Village
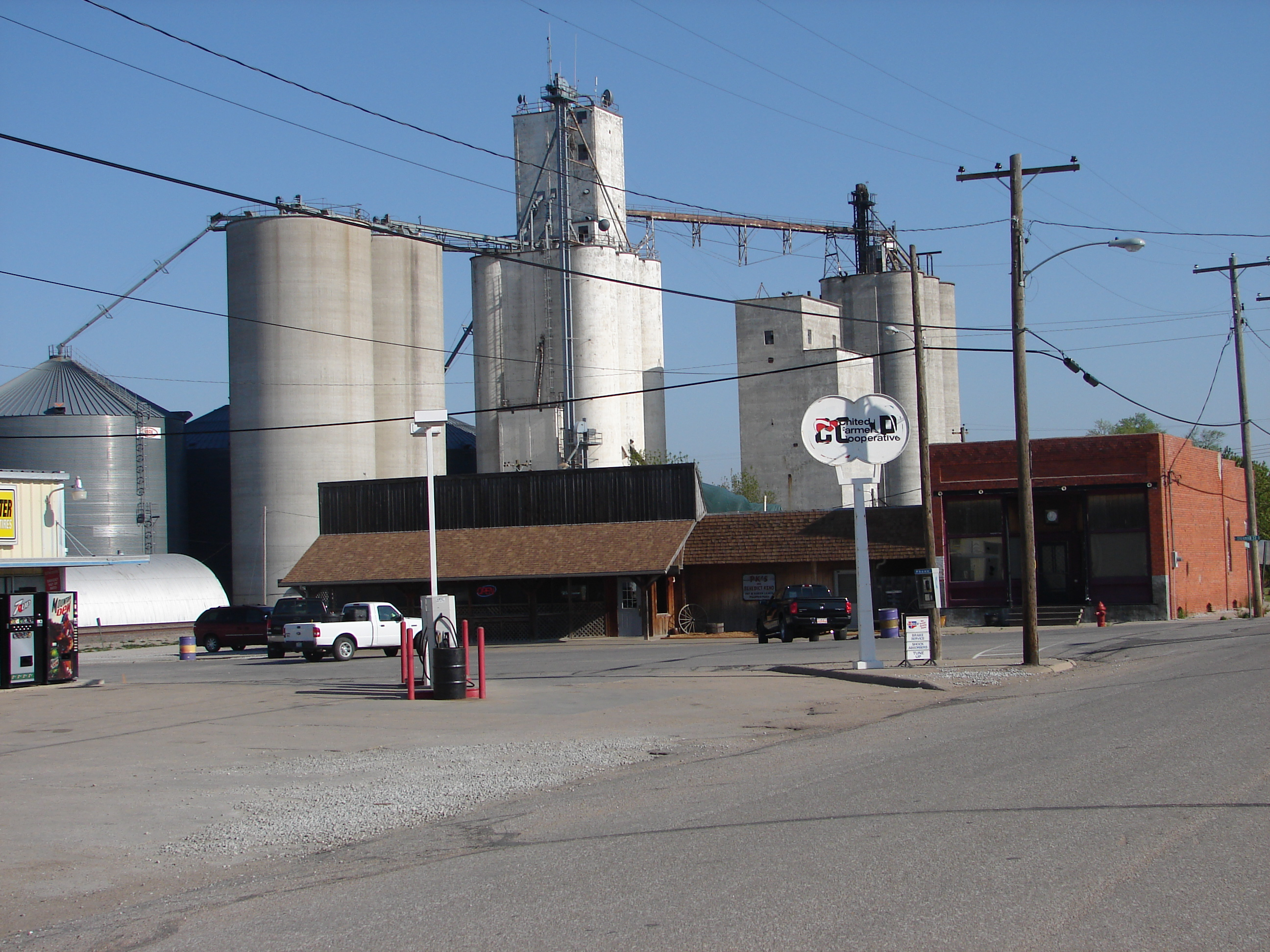
- Benedict, May 2011

- Location of Benedict, Nebraska
- Coordinates: 41°00′23″N 97°36′26″W
- Country: United States
- State: Nebraska
- County: York

Area
  - Total: 0.18 sq mi (0.47 km^{2})
  - Land: 0.18 sq mi (0.47 km^{2})
  - Water: 0 sq mi (0.00 km^{2})
- Elevation: 1,680 ft (510 m)

Population (2020)
  - Total: 203
  - Density: 1,107.6/sq mi (427.66/km^{2})
- Time zone: UTC-6 (Central (CST))
  - Summer (DST): UTC-5 (CDT)
- ZIP code: 68316
- Area code: 402
- FIPS code: 31-04195
- GNIS feature ID: 2398093

Benedict is a village in York County, Nebraska, United States. As of the 2020 census, Benedict had a population of 203.

== History ==
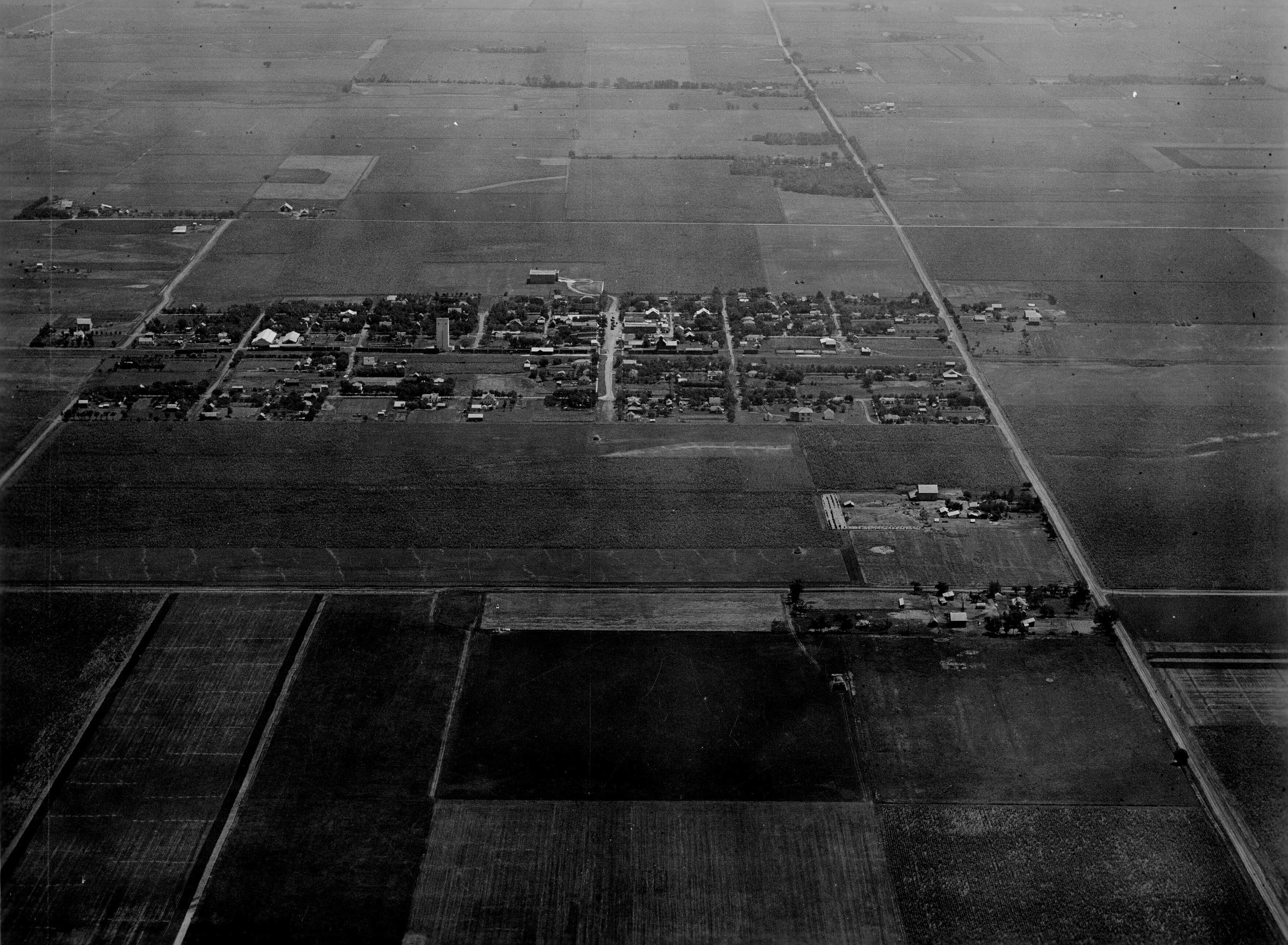
Aerial view of Benedict in 1925, Air Mail Emergency field in the foreground

Benedict was platted in 1886 when the Kansas City and Omaha Railroad was extended to that point. It was named for E. C. Benedict, a railroad official. Benedict was incorporated as a village in 1890.

== Geography ==
According to the United States Census Bureau, the village has a total area of 0.19 square miles (0.49 km^{2}), all land.

=== Climate ===
Climate data for Benedict, Nebraska (coordinates:41.0186°N 97.6720°W, 1991-2020)
Month	Jan	Feb	Mar	Apr	May	Jun	Jul	Aug	Sep	Oct	Nov	Dec	Year
Average precipitation inches (mm)	0.69 (18)	0.75 (19)	1.41 (36)	3.15 (80)	4.52 (115)	4.16 (106)	3.64 (92)	3.84 (98)	2.11 (54)	2.24 (57)	1.48 (38)	0.69 (18)	28.68 (731)
Average precipitation days (≥ 0.01 in)	1.6	2.2	5.9	8.9	11.3	10.2	8	8.4	6.9	6.7	3.4	2.5	76
Source: NOAA

== Demographics ==
Historical population
Census	Pop.	Note	%±
1900	292		—
1910	336		15.1%
1920	313		−6.8%
1930	279		−10.9%
1940	221		−20.8%
1950	206		−6.8%
1960	170		−17.5%
1970	209		22.9%
1980	228		9.1%
1990	230		0.9%
2000	278		20.9%
2010	234		−15.8%
2020	203		−13.2%
U.S. Decennial Census

=== 2010 census ===
As of the census of 2010, there were 234 people, 87 households, and 67 families residing in the village. The population density was 1,231.6 inhabitants per square mile (475.5/km^{2}). There were 97 housing units at an average density of 510.5 per square mile (197.1/km^{2}). The racial makeup of the village was 98.7% White, 0.4% African American, 0.4% Native American, and 0.4% from two or more races. Hispanic or Latino of any race were 0.4% of the population.

There were 87 households, of which 34.5% had children under the age of 18 living with them, 67.8% were married couples living together, 8.0% had a female householder with no husband present, 1.1% had a male householder with no wife present, and 23.0% were non-families. 16.1% of all households were made up of individuals, and 6.9% had someone living alone who was 65 years of age or older. The average household size was 2.69 and the average family size was 3.01.

The median age in the village was 40.2 years. 23.5% of residents were under the age of 18; 9.8% were between the ages of 18 and 24; 21.9% were from 25 to 44; 30.8% were from 45 to 64; and 14.1% were 65 years of age or older. The gender makeup of the village was 48.7% male and 51.3% female.

=== 2000 census ===
As of the census of 2000, there were 278 people, 96 households, and 72 families residing in the village. The population density was 1,465.4 inhabitants per square mile (565.8/km^{2}). There were 102 housing units at an average density of 537.7 per square mile (207.6/km^{2}). The racial makeup of the village was 93.88% White, 3.96% African American and 2.16% Native American.

There were 96 households, out of which 42.7% had children under the age of 18 living with them, 63.5% were married couples living together, 6.3% had a female householder with no husband present, and 25.0% were non-families. 21.9% of all households were made up of individuals, and 11.5% had someone living alone who was 65 years of age or older. The average household size was 2.90 and the average family size was 3.42.

In the village, the population was spread out, with 35.3% under the age of 18, 5.4% from 18 to 24, 30.9% from 25 to 44, 17.3% from 45 to 64, and 11.2% who were 65 years of age or older. The median age was 34 years. For every 100 females, there were 102.9 males. For every 100 females age 18 and over, there were 106.9 males.

As of 2000 the median income for a household in the village was $38,125, and the median income for a family was $41,250. Males had a median income of $28,438 versus $19,844 for females. The per capita income for the village was $12,248. About 1.3% of families and 2.8% of the population were below the poverty line, including 2.5% of those under the age of eighteen and 11.1% of those 65 or over.

== See also ==
- List of municipalities in Nebraska
