= National Register of Historic Places listings in Allen County, Indiana =

Location of Allen County in Indiana

This is a list of the National Register of Historic Places listings in Allen County, Indiana.

This is intended to be a complete list of the properties and districts on the National Register of Historic Places in Allen County, Indiana, United States. Latitude and longitude coordinates are provided for many National Register properties and districts; these locations may be seen together in an online map.

There are 83 properties and districts listed on the National Register in the county, including two National Historic Landmarks. Another four properties were once listed but have been removed.

Properties and districts located in incorporated areas display the name of the municipality, while properties and districts in unincorporated areas display the name of their civil township. Properties and districts split between multiple jurisdictions display the names of all jurisdictions.

This National Park Service list is complete through NPS recent listings posted September 18, 2026.

== Current listings ==
	Name on the Register	Image	Date listed	Location	City or town	Description
1	John H. and Mary Abercrombie House	John H. and Mary Abercrombie House	June 25, 2013 (#13000418)	3130 Parnell Ave. 41°06′16″N 85°07′42″W	Fort Wayne	
2	Allen County Courthouse	Allen County Courthouse	May 28, 1976 (#76000031)	715 S. Calhoun St. 41°04′47″N 85°08′22″W	Fort Wayne	
3	John H. Bass Mansion	John H. Bass Mansion	June 2, 1982 (#82000056)	2701 Spring St. 41°05′15″N 85°10′33″W	Fort Wayne	
4	Becker House	Becker House	November 17, 2022 (#100008406)	425 West Williams St. 41°04′02″N 85°08′38″W	Fort Wayne	
5	Beechwood Historic District	Beechwood Historic District	November 16, 2021 (#100007177)	Roughly bounded by Fairfield and South Wayne Aves., Pierce and Beechwood Drs. 41°03′42″N 85°08′48″W	Fort Wayne	
6	Blackstone Building	Blackstone Building	August 24, 1988 (#88001219)	112 W. Washington; 41°04′22″N 85°08′01″W	Fort Wayne	
7	Martin Blume Jr. Farm	Martin Blume Jr. Farm	September 20, 2006 (#06000847)	7311 Flutter Rd., northeast of Fort Wayne; 41°09′53″N 85°03′02″W	St. Joseph Township	
8	Brookview-Irvington Park Historic District	Brookview-Irvington Park Historic District	March 21, 2011 (#11000121)	Roughly bounded by Norfolk Ave. to the north, Lima Rd., Spy Run Ave. Extended, and N. Clinton St. to the east, Jacobs St. to the south, and the former Penn Central right-of-way to the west 41°06′04″N 85°08′27″W	Fort Wayne	
9	John Brown Stone Warehouse	John Brown Stone Warehouse	December 15, 1997 (#97001542)	114 W. Superior St. 41°04′56″N 85°08′23″W	Fort Wayne	
10	Calvary United Brethren-Turner Chapel AME Church	Calvary United Brethren-Turner Chapel AME Church	February 9, 2022 (#100007447)	836 East Jefferson Blvd. 41°04′40″N 85°07′35″W	Fort Wayne	
11	Cathedral of the Immaculate Conception	Cathedral of the Immaculate Conception	October 23, 1980 (#80000048)	Jefferson and Calhoun St. 41°04′33″N 85°08′16″W	Fort Wayne	
12	Chief Jean Baptiste de Richardville House	Chief Jean Baptiste de Richardville House	June 27, 1997 (#97000595)	5705 Bluffton Rd. 41°01′53″N 85°09′52″W	Fort Wayne	Designated a National Historic Landmark on March 2, 2012 as "Akima Pinsiwa Awiiki (Chief Jean-Baptiste de Richardville House)"
13	Coca-Cola Bottling Plant		August 23, 2021 (#100006841)	1631 Pontiac St. 41°03′39″N 85°06′56″W	Fort Wayne vicinity	
14	Colman-Doctor Farm		March 6, 2019 (#100003499)	5910 Maples Rd. 41°00′14″N 85°03′45″W	Fort Wayne vicinity	
15	Congregation Achduth Vesholom		June 1, 2026 (#100013071)	5200 Old Mill Road; 41°02′10″N 85°09′01″W	Fort Wayne	
16	Driving Park-Seven States Historic District		March 3, 2021 (#100006201)	Roughly bounded by Vermont Ave., Crescent Ave. Florida Dr., State Blvd., West and East Drs., Curdes, and Dodge Aves. Ave; 41°05′58″N 85°07′08″W	Fort Wayne	
17	Dutch Ridge Historic District	Dutch Ridge Historic District	September 14, 1995 (#95001110)	17915 and 17819 Old Auburn Rd. and adjacent cemetery, northeast of Huntertown; 41°15′04″N 85°05′48″W	Perry Township	
18	William S. Edsall House	William S. Edsall House	October 8, 1976 (#76000032)	305 W. Main St. 41°04′46″N 85°08′38″W	Fort Wayne	
19	Embassy Theater and Indiana Hotel	Embassy Theater and Indiana Hotel	September 5, 1975 (#75000041)	121 W. Jefferson St. 41°04′32″N 85°08′24″W	Fort Wayne	
20	Engine House No. 3	Engine House No. 3	July 27, 1979 (#79003772)	226 W. Washington Boulevard; 41°04′38″N 85°08′30″W	Fort Wayne	
21	Fairfield Manor	Fairfield Manor	June 16, 1983 (#83000047)	2301 Fairfield Ave. 41°03′50″N 85°08′41″W	Fort Wayne	
22	Robert M. Feustel House	Robert M. Feustel House	November 7, 1980 (#80000049)	4101 W. Taylor St. 41°03′52″N 85°11′38″W	Fort Wayne	
23	Forest Park Boulevard Historic District	Forest Park Boulevard Historic District	March 30, 2007 (#07000212)	Roughly bounded by Dodge Ave., the alley between Forest Park and Anthony Boulevards, Lake Ave., and the alley 41°05′43″N 85°07′03″W	Fort Wayne	
24	Fort Wayne City Hall	Fort Wayne City Hall	June 4, 1973 (#73000027)	308 E. Berry St. 41°04′46″N 85°08′10″W	Fort Wayne	
25	Fort Wayne Park and Boulevard System Historic District	Fort Wayne Park and Boulevard System Historic District	December 28, 2010 (#10001099)	Roughly including the following parks and adjacent rights-of-way: Franke, McCormick, McCulloch, McMillen, Memorial, Nuckols, Old Fort, Reservoir, Rockhill, Weisser, and Williams; 41°03′51″N 85°05′26″W	Fort Wayne	
26	Fort Wayne Performing Arts Theatre	Fort Wayne Performing Arts Theatre	November 25, 2024 (#100011042)	303 East Main Street; 41°04′54″N 85°08′12″W	Fort Wayne	Now known as the Arts United Center
27	Fort Wayne Printing Company Building	Fort Wayne Printing Company Building	August 24, 1988 (#88001220)	114 W. Washington St. 41°04′38″N 85°08′23″W	Fort Wayne	
28	Foster Park Neighborhood Historic District	Foster Park Neighborhood Historic District	September 25, 2013 (#13000755)	Roughly bounded by Old Mill Rd., Rudisell Boulevard, Kimmel Dr., and Lexington Ave. 41°02′52″N 85°09′20″W	Fort Wayne	
29	General Electric Fort Wayne Electric Works Historic District	General Electric Fort Wayne Electric Works Historic District	February 27, 2023 (#100008658)	1635 Broadway and 1030 Swinney Ave. 41°04′17″N 85°08′56″W	Fort Wayne	
30	William C. and Clara Hagerman House	William C. and Clara Hagerman House	March 17, 2015 (#15000076)	2105 N. Anthony Boulevard; 41°05′43″N 85°06′57″W	Fort Wayne	
31	Harrison Hill Historic District		August 25, 2021 (#100006844)	Roughly bounded by West Rudisill Blvd., South Calhoun St., South Cornell Cir., Pasadena Dr., Hoagland Ave., and Webster St. 41°02′41″N 85°08′25″W	Fort Wayne	
32	John and Dorothy Haynes House	John and Dorothy Haynes House	June 22, 2004 (#04000635)	3901 N. Washington Rd. 41°04′14″N 85°11′27″W	Fort Wayne	
33	Illsley Place-West Rudisill Historic District	Illsley Place-West Rudisill Historic District	April 20, 2006 (#06000310)	Roughly bounded by Broadway, W. Rudisill Boulevard, Beaver Ave., and the alley north of Illsley Dr. 41°03′03″N 85°09′15″W	Fort Wayne	
34	Indian Village Historic District	Indian Village Historic District	December 22, 2009 (#09001125)	Roughly bounded by Nuttman Ave. on the north, Bluffton Rd. on the east, Eagle Rd. on the south, and the Norfolk Southern railway line on the west 41°02′54″N 85°10′21″W	Fort Wayne	
35	Irishtown Commercial Historic District		March 2, 2026 (#100012766)	East side of Fairfield Avenue between Taylor and Walnut Streets; 41°04′03″N 85°08′43″W	Fort Wayne	
36	Johnny Appleseed Memorial Park	Johnny Appleseed Memorial Park	January 17, 1973 (#73000028)	Swanson Boulevard at Parnell Ave. along Old Feeder Canal; 41°06′44″N 85°07′25″W	Fort Wayne	
37	Journal-Gazette Building	Journal-Gazette Building	December 27, 1982 (#82000057)	701 S. Clinton St. 41°04′49″N 85°08′17″W	Fort Wayne	
38	Kensington Boulevard Historic District	Kensington Boulevard Historic District	September 3, 2019 (#100004368)	Roughly bounded by East State Blvd., North Anthony Blvd., Niagara Dr., and Pemberton Dr. 41°05′23″N 85°06′50″W	Fort Wayne	
39	Harry A. Keplinger House	Harry A. Keplinger House	September 1, 1983 (#83000048)	235 W. Creighton Ave. 41°03′51″N 85°08′26″W	Fort Wayne	
40	Kirkwood Park Historic District		May 19, 2025 (#100011866)	Bounded by Coliseum Boulevard on the north, Glenhurst Avenue on the east, Springfield Avenue on the south, and Crescent Avenue on the west. 41°06′33″N 85°06′27″W	Fort Wayne	
41	Kresge-Groth Building	Kresge-Groth Building	August 25, 1988 (#88001223)	914 S. Calhoun St. 41°04′41″N 85°08′22″W	Fort Wayne	
42	Lafayette Place Historic District	Lafayette Place Historic District	January 9, 2013 (#12001147)	Roughly bounded by S. Calhoun and Lafayette Sts., and McKinnie and Pettit Aves. 41°02′40″N 85°08′00″W	Fort Wayne	
43	Lakeside Historic District	Lakeside Historic District	December 8, 2017 (#100001879)	Roughly bounded by St. Joe Blvd., Edgewater, Tennessee, Crescent & California Aves. 41°05′10″N 85°07′35″W	Fort Wayne	
44	The Landing Historic District	The Landing Historic District	September 16, 1993 (#93000953)	Roughly bounded by Calhoun, Harrison, Dock, and Pearl Sts., and the alley between Columbia and Main Sts. 41°04′52″N 85°08′29″W	Fort Wayne	
45	Lindenwood Cemetery	Lindenwood Cemetery	February 17, 1978 (#78000043)	2324 W. Main St. 41°04′47″N 85°10′32″W	Fort Wayne	
46	Maple Place Historic District		March 2, 2026 (#100012767)	Maple Place Addition; 41°03′41″N 85°09′14″W	Fort Wayne	
47	Masonic Temple	Masonic Temple	March 14, 1991 (#91000273)	206 E. Washington Boulevard; 41°04′39″N 85°08′55″W	Fort Wayne	
48	McColloch-Weatherhogg Double House	McColloch-Weatherhogg Double House	December 7, 2001 (#01001350)	334-336 E. Berry St. 41°04′54″N 85°08′07″W	Fort Wayne	
49	Hugh McCulloch House	Hugh McCulloch House	October 23, 1980 (#80000050)	616 W. Superior St. 41°04′51″N 85°08′50″W	Fort Wayne	
50	Louis Mohr Block	Louis Mohr Block	August 26, 1988 (#88001222)	119 W. Wayne St. 41°04′41″N 85°08′24″W	Fort Wayne	
51	New York Chicago and St. Louis Railroad Steam Locomotive No. 765	New York Chicago and St. Louis Railroad Steam Locomotive No. 765	September 12, 1996 (#96001010)	15808 Edgerton Rd., east of New Haven; 41°05′16″N 84°56′14″W	Jefferson Township	
52	Ninde-Mead-Farnsworth House	Ninde-Mead-Farnsworth House	March 20, 2013 (#13000082)	734 E. State Boulevard; 41°05′47″N 85°07′49″W	Fort Wayne	
53	North Anthony Boulevard Historic District	North Anthony Boulevard Historic District	September 30, 2014 (#14000800)	Roughly N. Anthony Boulevard between Vance and Lake Aves. 41°06′00″N 85°06′56″W	Fort Wayne	
54	Northwood Historic District		September 18, 2026 (#100013349)	Bounded by East State Boulevard on the north, Forest Avenue on the south, Kentucky Avenue on the east, and each side of St. Joseph Boulevard on the west 41°05′44″N 85°07′39″W	Fort Wayne	
55	Oakdale Historic District	Oakdale Historic District	September 22, 2000 (#00001132)	Roughly along Oakdale Dr. from Harrison St. to Broadway; 41°03′06″N 85°08′52″W	Fort Wayne	
56	Pennsylvania Produce Terminal Historic District - Fort Wayne		September 2, 2025 (#100012181)	420, 433, 435, 438, 440, 450 East Brackenridge Street; 41°04′24″N 85°07′54″W	Fort Wayne	
57	Pennsylvania Railroad Station	Pennsylvania Railroad Station	August 14, 1998 (#98001056)	221 W. Baker St. 41°04′20″N 85°08′26″W	Fort Wayne	
58	John Claus Peters House	John Claus Peters House	September 17, 1980 (#80000051)	832 W. Wayne St. 41°04′36″N 85°09′03″W	Fort Wayne	
59	Randall Building	Randall Building	December 7, 1990 (#90001786)	616 and 618 S. Harrison St. 41°04′52″N 85°08′33″W	Fort Wayne	
60	Alexander Taylor Rankin House	Alexander Taylor Rankin House	December 6, 2004 (#04001317)	818 S. Lafayette St. 41°04′53″N 85°08′05″W	Fort Wayne	
61	Horney Robinson House	Horney Robinson House	March 21, 1985 (#85000604)	7320 Lower Huntington Rd., southwest of Fort Wayne; 41°00′19″N 85°14′13″W	Wayne Township	
62	Saint Joseph's Nurses Home		May 19, 2025 (#100011865)	835 Van Buren Street; 41°04′39″N 85°08′59″W	Fort Wayne	
63	St. Louis, Besancon, Historic District	St. Louis, Besancon, Historic District	September 22, 1995 (#95001112)	15529-15535 E. Lincoln Highway, southeast of New Haven; 41°03′03″N 84°56′15″W	Jefferson Township	
64	Saint Paul's Evangelical Lutheran Church	Saint Paul's Evangelical Lutheran Church	March 1, 1982 (#82000058)	1126 S. Barr St. 41°04′32″N 85°08′08″W	Fort Wayne	
65	St. Peter's Square	St. Peter's Square	March 20, 1991 (#91000259)	Roughly bounded by St. Martin, Hanna, E. Dewald, and Warsaw Sts., including 518 E. Dewald St. 41°03′56″N 85°07′46″W	Fort Wayne	
66	St. Rose de Lima Roman Catholic Church and Rectory		August 27, 2020 (#100005514)	209 Mulberry St. and 206 Summit St. 40°58′20″N 84°52′05″W	Monroeville	
67	St. Vincent Villa Historic District	St. Vincent Villa Historic District	June 10, 1994 (#94000587)	2000 N. Wells St. 41°05′35″N 85°08′39″W	Fort Wayne	
68	Schmitz Block	Schmitz Block	August 26, 1988 (#88001224)	926-930 S. Calhoun St. 41°04′39″N 85°08′21″W	Fort Wayne	
69	Shawnee Place Historic District		August 27, 2024 (#100010747)	Roughly bounded by Killea Street, Kinnaird Avenue, Webster Street, and the second alley west of Hoagland Avenue; 41°03′25″N 85°08′29″W	Fort Wayne	
70	Smith Field	Smith Field	March 26, 2003 (#02001495)	426 W. Ludwig Rd. 41°08′36″N 85°09′10″W	Fort Wayne	
71	South Wayne Historic District	South Wayne Historic District	September 4, 1992 (#92001146)	Roughly bounded by W. Wildwood Ave., S. Wayne Ave., Packard Ave., and Beaver Ave. 41°03′22″N 85°08′59″W	Fort Wayne	
72	Southwood Park Historic District	Southwood Park Historic District	December 22, 2009 (#09001126)	Bounded by W. Pettit Ave., Stratford Rd., W. Sherwood Terrace, Hartman Rd., Lexington Ave., and Indiana Ave. 41°02′32″N 85°08′57″W	Fort Wayne	
73	Christian G. Strunz House	Christian G. Strunz House	October 4, 1979 (#79000030)	333 E. Berry St. 41°04′49″N 85°08′07″W	Fort Wayne	
74	Thomas W. Swinney House	Thomas W. Swinney House	April 27, 1981 (#81000026)	1424 W. Jefferson St. 41°04′24″N 85°09′27″W	Fort Wayne	
75	Trinity Episcopal Church	Trinity Episcopal Church	September 13, 1978 (#78000044)	611 W. Berry St. 41°04′40″N 85°08′52″W	Fort Wayne	
76	US Post Office and Courthouse	US Post Office and Courthouse	March 15, 2006 (#06000125)	1300 W. Harrison St. 41°04′26″N 85°08′26″W	Fort Wayne	
77	Vermilyea Inn Historic District	Vermilyea Inn Historic District	December 6, 2005 (#05001365)	13501 Redding Dr., southwest of Fort Wayne; 41°00′46″N 85°19′04″W	Aboite Township	
78	Wabash Railroad Depot	Wabash Railroad Depot	March 26, 2003 (#03000146)	530 State St. 41°04′18″N 85°01′20″W	New Haven	
79	Wells Street Bridge	Wells Street Bridge	September 15, 1988 (#88001575)	Wells St. at the St. Marys River; 41°05′13″N 85°08′27″W	Fort Wayne	
80	West End Historic District	West End Historic District	November 15, 1984 (#84000352)	Roughly bounded by Main, Webster, Jefferson, Broadway, Jones, and the St. Marys River; 41°04′32″N 85°08′59″W	Fort Wayne	
81	Fisher West Farm	Fisher West Farm	June 6, 1985 (#85001193)	17935 West Rd., northeast of Huntertown; 41°15′05″N 85°09′11″W	Perry Township	
82	Wildwood Park Historic District	Wildwood Park Historic District	September 18, 2013 (#13000720)	Roughly bounded by Freeman St., Illinois Rd., W. Jefferson and Portage Boulevards, and Lindenwood and Ardmore Aves. 41°04′16″N 85°11′10″W	Fort Wayne	
83	Williams–Woodland Park Historic District	Williams–Woodland Park Historic District	March 14, 1991 (#91000258)	Roughly bounded by Hoagland and Creighton Aves. and Harrison and Pontiac Sts. 41°03′45″N 85°08′28″W	Fort Wayne	

== Former listings ==
	Name on the Register	Image	Date listed	Date removed	Location	City or town	Description
1	Irene Byron Tuberculosis Sanatorium-Physicians' Residences	Irene Byron Tuberculosis Sanatorium-Physicians' Residences	December 6, 2004 (#04001316)	December 31, 2013	12371 and 12407 Lima Rd., north of Fort Wayne; 41°11′48″N 85°10′12″W	Perry Township	
2	Craigville Depot	Craigville Depot	October 10, 1984 (#84000181)	February 22, 2023	Ryan and Edgerton Rds., east of New Haven; 41°04′45″N 84°57′42″W	Jefferson Township	
3	Hursh Road Bridge (Bridge Number 38)		June 4, 1981 (#81000025)	May 25, 1993	West of Cedarville on Hursh Road; 41°12′55″N 85°03′05″W	Cedarville	
4	St. Mary's Catholic Church	St. Mary's Catholic Church	December 27, 1984 (#84000483)	September 13, 1993	1101 S. Lafayette St. 41°04′36″N 85°08′00″W	Fort Wayne	Destroyed by fire September 2, 1993 after being struck by lightning.

== See also ==
- List of National Historic Landmarks in Indiana
- National Register of Historic Places listings in Indiana
- Listings in neighboring counties: Adams, Defiance (OH), DeKalb, Huntington, Noble, Paulding (OH), Van Wert (OH), Wells, Whitley
- List of Indiana state historical markers in Allen County
