= South Wayne Historic District =

South Wayne Historic District may refer to:

- South Wayne Historic District (Fort Wayne, Indiana), listed on the National Register of Historic Places in Allen County, Indiana
- South Wayne Historic District (Wayne, Pennsylvania), listed on the National Register of Historic Places in Delaware County, Pennsylvania
