= Lakeside Historic District (Fort Wayne, Indiana) =

Historic district in Indiana, United States

- U.S. National Register of Historic Places
- U.S. Historic district
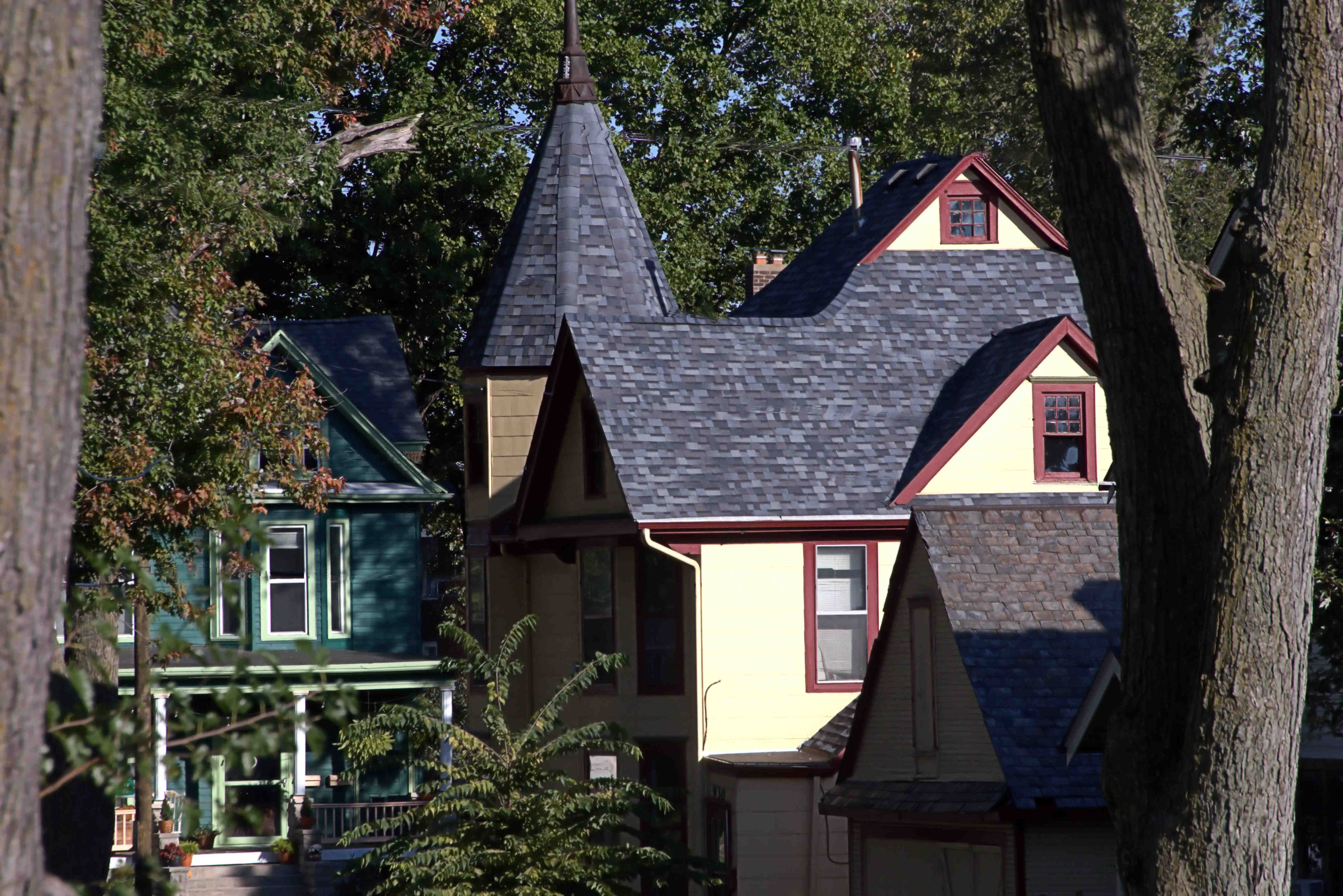

- Location within Indiana Location within the United States
- Location: Between Tennessee Avenue, Saint Joe Boulevard, Edgewater, and Crescent and California Avenues Fort Wayne, Indiana
- Built: 1890-1940
- Architectural style: Queen Anne, American Craftsman, Colonial Revival, Cape Cod, American Foursquare
- NRHP reference No.: 100001879
- Added to NRHP: 2018

The Lakeside Historic District is a historic district on the National Register of Historic Places in Fort Wayne, Indiana, added in 2018.

The district is bounded by Tennessee Avenue to the north, Saint Joe Boulevard (following the Saint Joseph River to the west, Edgewater Avenue (following the Maumee River to the south, and Crescent and California Avenues to the east. The district is laid out in an orthogonal pattern, with a combination of straight and curved streets. The district contains more than 470 buildings, with 439 built between 1890 and 1940, in a variety of styles, principally Queen Anne, American Craftsman, Colonial Revival, Cape Cod, American Foursquare, American Small House.

The layout of the district was influenced by the natural contours of the peninsula and ideas of Charles Mulford Robinson, although the area was already under development when Robinson was hired by the city to perform a study. Some of Robinson's ideas, like consistent setbacks and unfenced lawns, with plantings of trees next to the curbs, were put in to practice by the developer, David N. Foster, who called his development Lakeside Park Addition. Foster originally left a small area near Tennessee Avenue and Oneida Avenue to be developed into a park; however, it was later decided to create the much larger Lakeside Park slightly to the east, and the previously reserved area was developed with housing. Lakeside Park was part of the original plat for the development, but sits outside the present boundaries of the district. The planned park at Oneida and Tennessee Avenues was to have been called Eden Park, and Tennessee Avenue was originally called Sunnyside Avenue. Additional planned parkland along the north bank of the Maumee River was sacrificed to build dikes, and plans for the eventual Lakeside Park were scaled back slightly to allow the creation of California Avenue.

Construction in the district began in 1890, with the developer offering to pay the first year's property taxes for all buyers, and offering financing of house construction to any buyer who paid cash for the land. A series of advertisements promoting the scheme ran in the Fort Wayne Journal, a predecessor to the Fort Wayne Journal-Gazette. The developer used the ponds being excavated in nearby Lakeside Park as a further inducement to buy, with a promise to turn to the creation of dikes for flood protection as soon as the park was finished. Dirt from the excavation of the ponds was used to construct the promised dykes. Meanwhile, the Lakeside Street Railroad Company was formed by R.T. MacDonald, to ferry new residents to and from downtown Fort Wayne, across the Saint Joseph River. The line was eventually absorbed the Fort Wayne and Wabash Valley Traction Company.This line was further absorbed into the Indiana Service Corporation, which was in turn absorbed by the Indiana Railroad.

The growing Lakeside Park Addition was threatened by the 1913 Fort Wayne Flood on March 25 of that year. After being alerted by a volunteer watch on the Coombs Street Bridge, Fort Wayne Police brought in vagrants from the jail at the Fort Wayne Old City Hall Building across the river to reinforce the dike along Edgewater. The dike along Saint Joe Boulevard failed, and Combined sewer mains were uncovered. Workers tossed bags full of concrete into the break near Coombs Street, but water rushed down Lake and Columbia Avenues in the district. Waters began to recede at the end of the month, and the community began to clean up. The mayor threatened to shoot looters who preyed on homes that had to be evacuated.
