= West End Historic District (Fort Wayne, Indiana) =

Historic district in Indiana, United States

- U.S. National Register of Historic Places
- U.S. Historic district
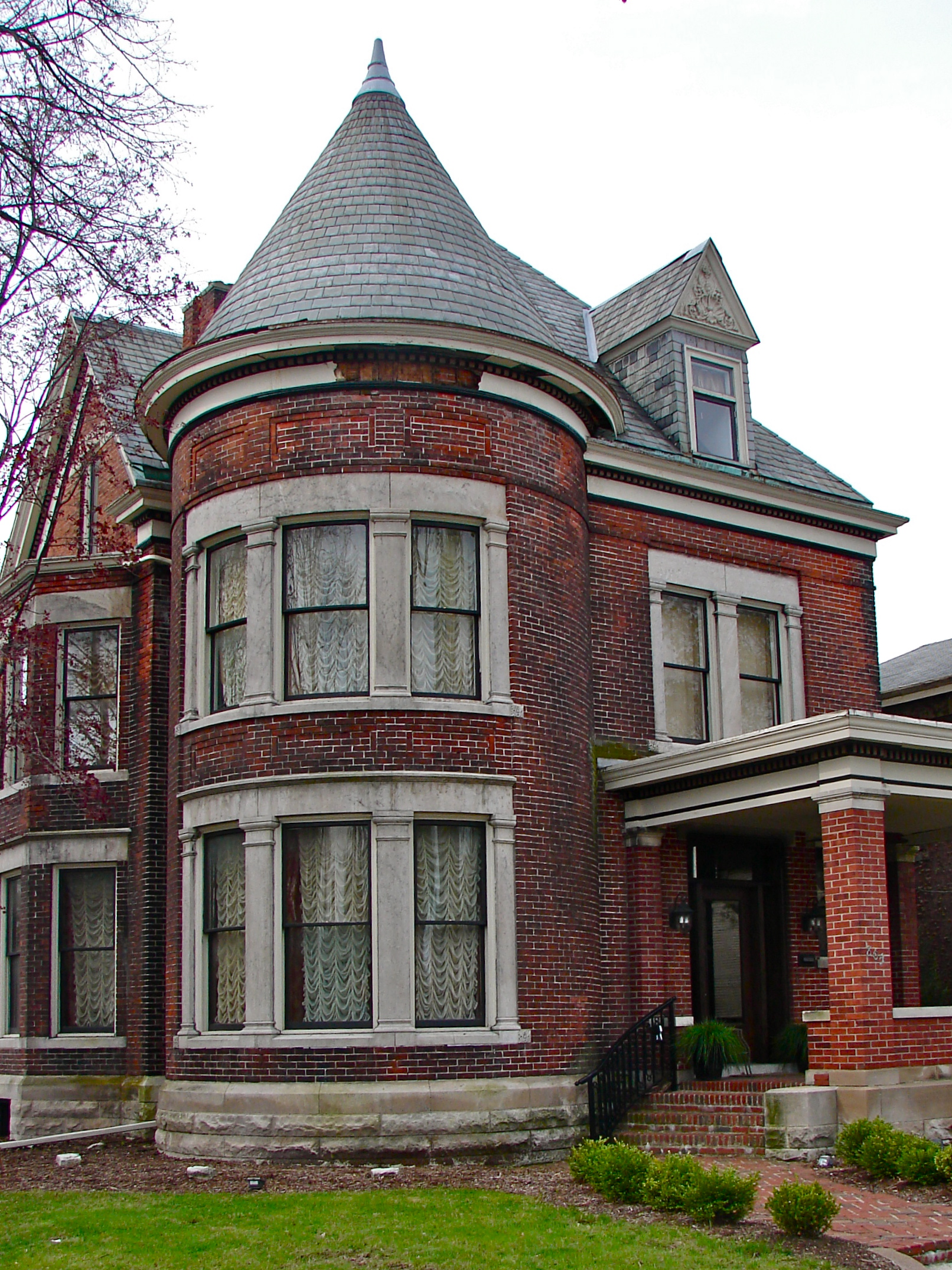
- House in the West End Historic District, April 2011

- Location within Indiana Location within the United States
- Location: Roughly bounded by Main, Webster, Jefferson, Broadway, Jones, and St. Mary's River, Fort Wayne, Indiana
- Coordinates: 41°04′32″N 85°08′59″W
- Area: 148 acres (60 ha)
- Built: 1840
- Architect: Multiple
- Architectural style: Bungalow/craftsman, Greek Revival, Late Victorian
- NRHP reference No.: 84000352
- Added to NRHP: November 15, 1984

West End Historic District, also known as the West Central Neighborhood, is a national historic district located in Fort Wayne, Indiana. The district encompasses 596 contributing buildings in a predominantly residential section of Fort Wayne. The area was developed from about 1840 to 1935 and includes notable examples of Greek Revival, Late Victorian, and Bungalow / American Craftsman style residential architecture. The district features numerous middle- and upper-income residences, as well as landmarks such as the University of Saint Francis Performing Arts Center (formerly the Scottish Rite Auditorium) and Trinity English Lutheran Church, which was last designed by Bertram Grosvenor Goodhue.

Several buildings within the district are individually listed on the National Register of Historic Places, including the Christian G. Strunz House, John Claus Peters House, and Trinity Episcopal Church.

The West End Historic District was added to the National Register of Historic Places in 1984.
