= List of Indiana state historical markers in Allen County =

Location of Allen County in Indiana

This is a list of the Indiana state historical markers in Allen County.

This is intended to be a complete list of the official state historical markers placed in Allen County, Indiana, United States by the Indiana Historical Bureau. The locations of the historical markers and their latitude and longitude coordinates are included below when available, along with their names, years of placement, and topics as recorded by the Historical Bureau. There are 5 historical markers located in Allen County.

== Historical markers ==
Marker title	Image	Year placed	Location	Topics
Camp Allen, 1861-64		1963	Southeastern corner of the junction of Center and Huron Streets at a playground entrance in Fort Wayne; 41°4′35″N 85°9′29″W	Military
Home of Philo T. Farnsworth		1992	St. Joseph and E. State Boulevards in Fort Wayne; 41°5′47″N 85°7′48″W	Science, Medicine, and Inventions, Arts and Culture, Newspapers and Media
Wabash and Erie Canal Groundbreaking		1992	1716 W. Main Street in Fort Wayne; 41°4′44″N 85°9′53″W	Business, Industry, and Labor, Transportation
Fort Miamis		2000	Southwestern corner of the Van Buren Street Bridge and the St. Marys River boat ramp in Guldin Park along Michaels Avenue in Fort Wayne; 41°4′52″N 85°9′4″W	Early Settlement and Exploration, Military
Gronauer Lock No. 2		2003	U.S. Route 24 just beyond the eastern interchange of the Interstate 469 bypass near New Haven; 41°5′8″N 84°59′24″W	Transportation, Business, Industry, and Labor

== See also ==
- List of Indiana state historical markers
- National Register of Historic Places listings in Allen County, Indiana
