= John Claus Peters House =

Historic house in Indiana, United States

- U.S. National Register of Historic Places
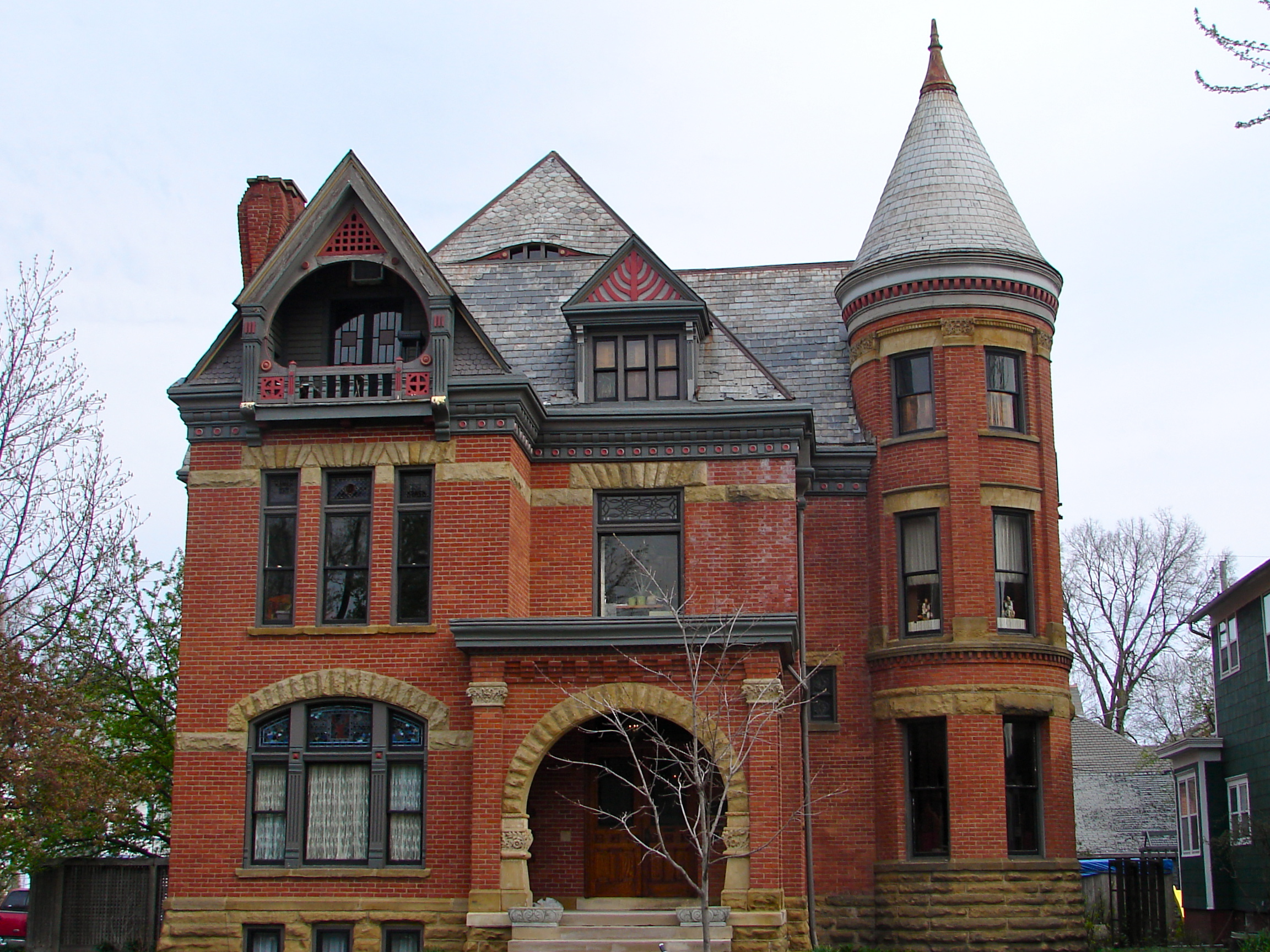

- Location within Indiana Location within the United States
- Location: 832 West Wayne Street, Fort Wayne, Indiana
- Coordinates: 41°4′36″N 85°9′3″W
- Area: 0.2 acres (0.081 ha)
- Built: 1885
- Built by: John Wing
- Architectural style: Queen Anne
- NRHP reference No.: 80000051
- Added to NRHP: September 17, 1980

The John Claus Peters House is a historic home at 832 West Wayne Street in Fort Wayne, Indiana. It was added to the National Register of Historic Places on September 17, 1980. It is part of Fort Wayne's West End Historic District. It was built in 1885 for Mary and John Claus Peters who had seven children. John Wing designed the Queen Anne style house. It has eight fireplaces.

J.C. Peters was born in Fort Wayne in 1848 and was the grandfather of actress Carole Lombard. His business's included Horton Washing Machine Company (established in 1871), the Wayne Hotel (acquired in 1886), Indiana Road Machine Co., and Peters Hardware.

== See also ==
- National Register of Historic Places listings in Allen County, Indiana
