= Thomas W. Swinney House =

Historic house in Indiana, United States

- U.S. National Register of Historic Places
- U.S. Historic district – Contributing property
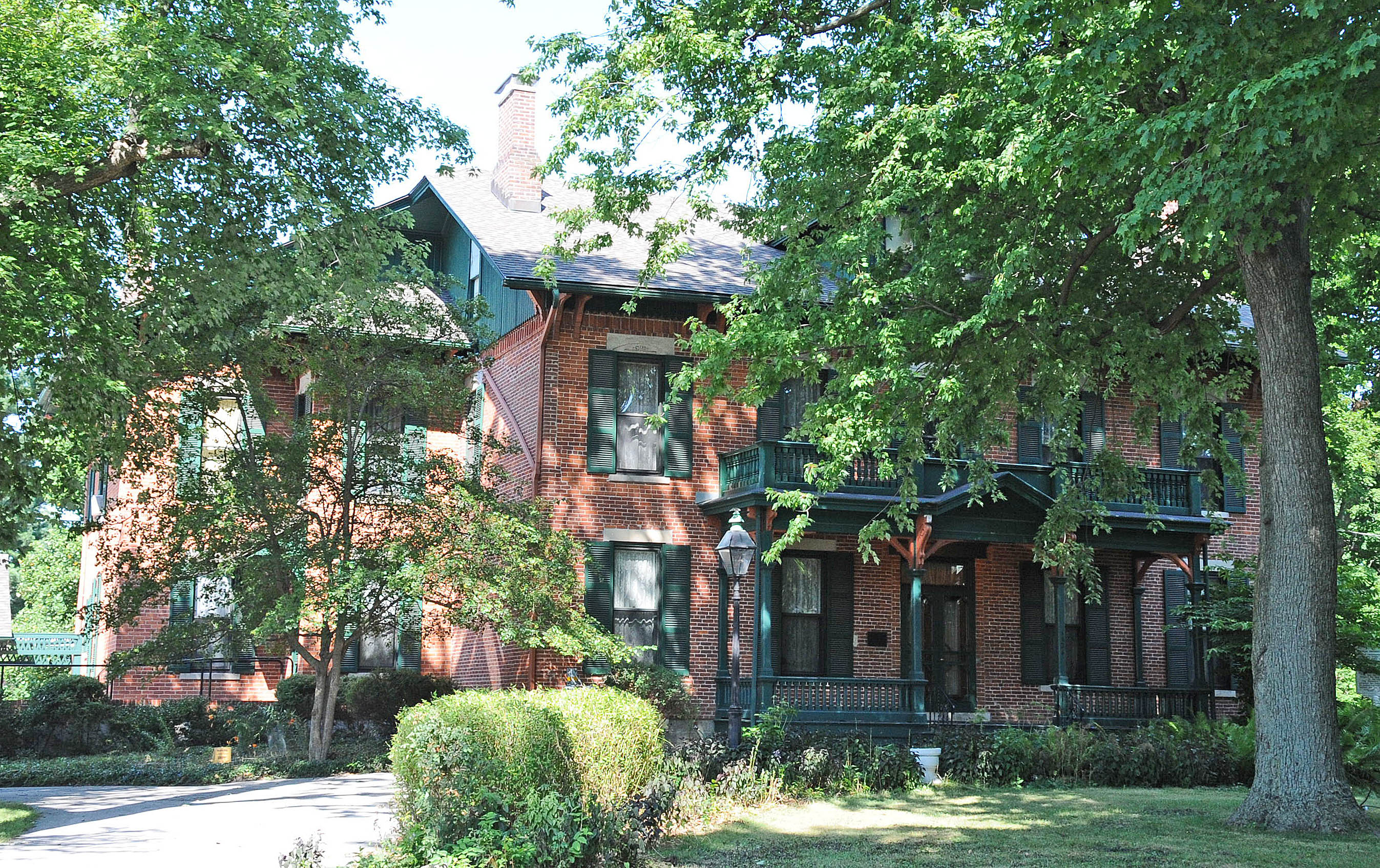
- Thomas W. Swinney House

- Location within Indiana Location within the United States
- Location: 1424 W. Jefferson St., Fort Wayne, Indiana
- Coordinates: 41°4′24″N 85°9′27″W
- Area: less than one acre
- Built: 1844-1845, 1885
- Architectural style: Late Victorian, Eastlake porch
- NRHP reference No.: 81000026
- Added to NRHP: April 27, 1981

Thomas W. Swinney House, also known as The Swinney Homestead, is a historic home located at Fort Wayne, Indiana. It was built in 1844–1845 as a 1 1/2-story brick and limestone structure. It was enlarged with a 2 1/2-story, square, Late Victorian style brick wing about 1885. It features an Eastlake movement front porch. It was built by Thomas J. Swinney, a pioneer settler of Allen County and prominent Fort Wayne businessman. The house and land for Swinney Park were passed to the city of Fort Wayne in 1922.

It was listed on the National Register of Historic Places in 1981. It is located in the Fort Wayne Park and Boulevard System Historic District.

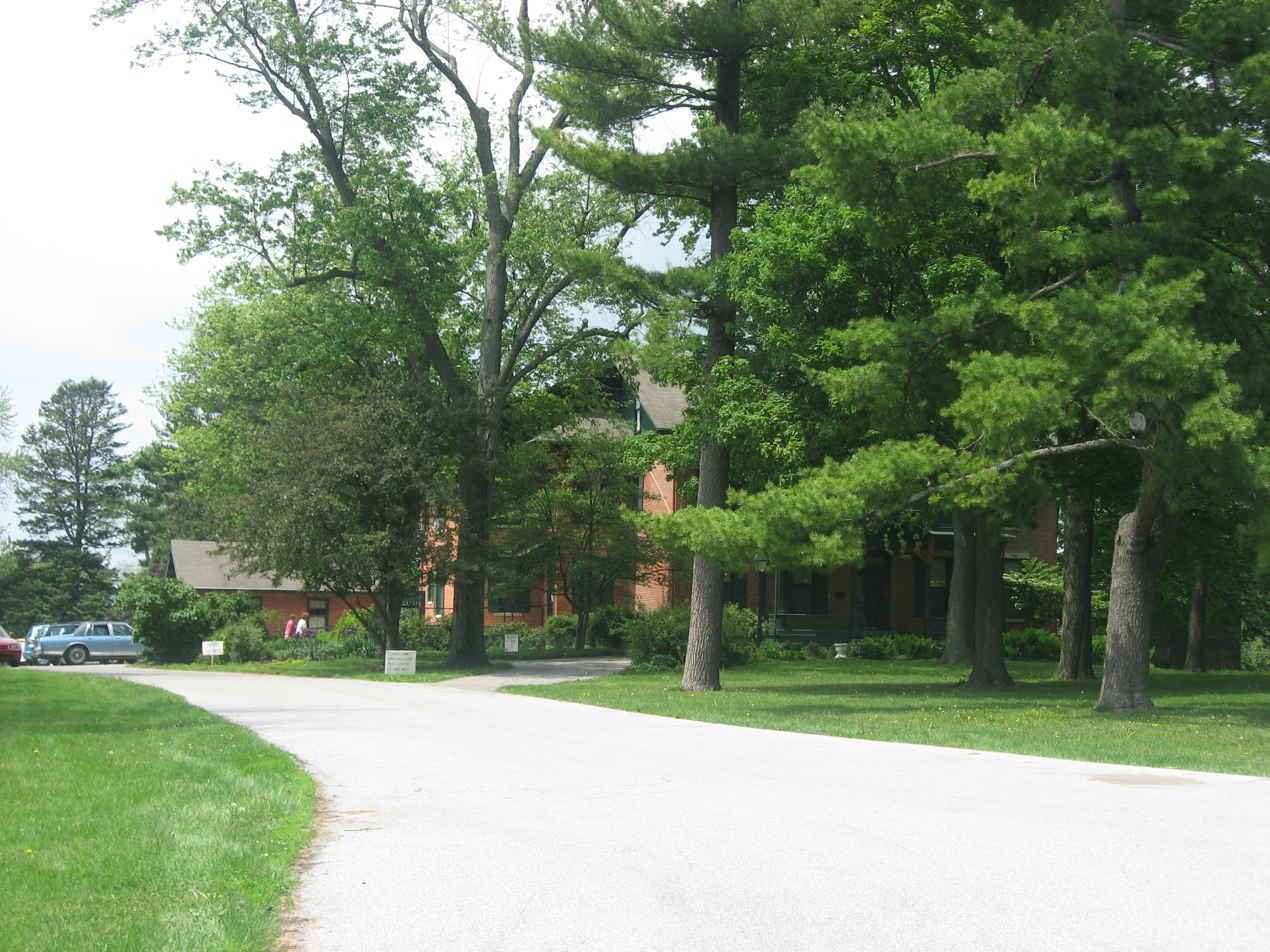
Side view
