= John D. Haynes House =

Historic house in Indiana, United States

- John and Dorothy Haynes House
- U.S. National Register of Historic Places
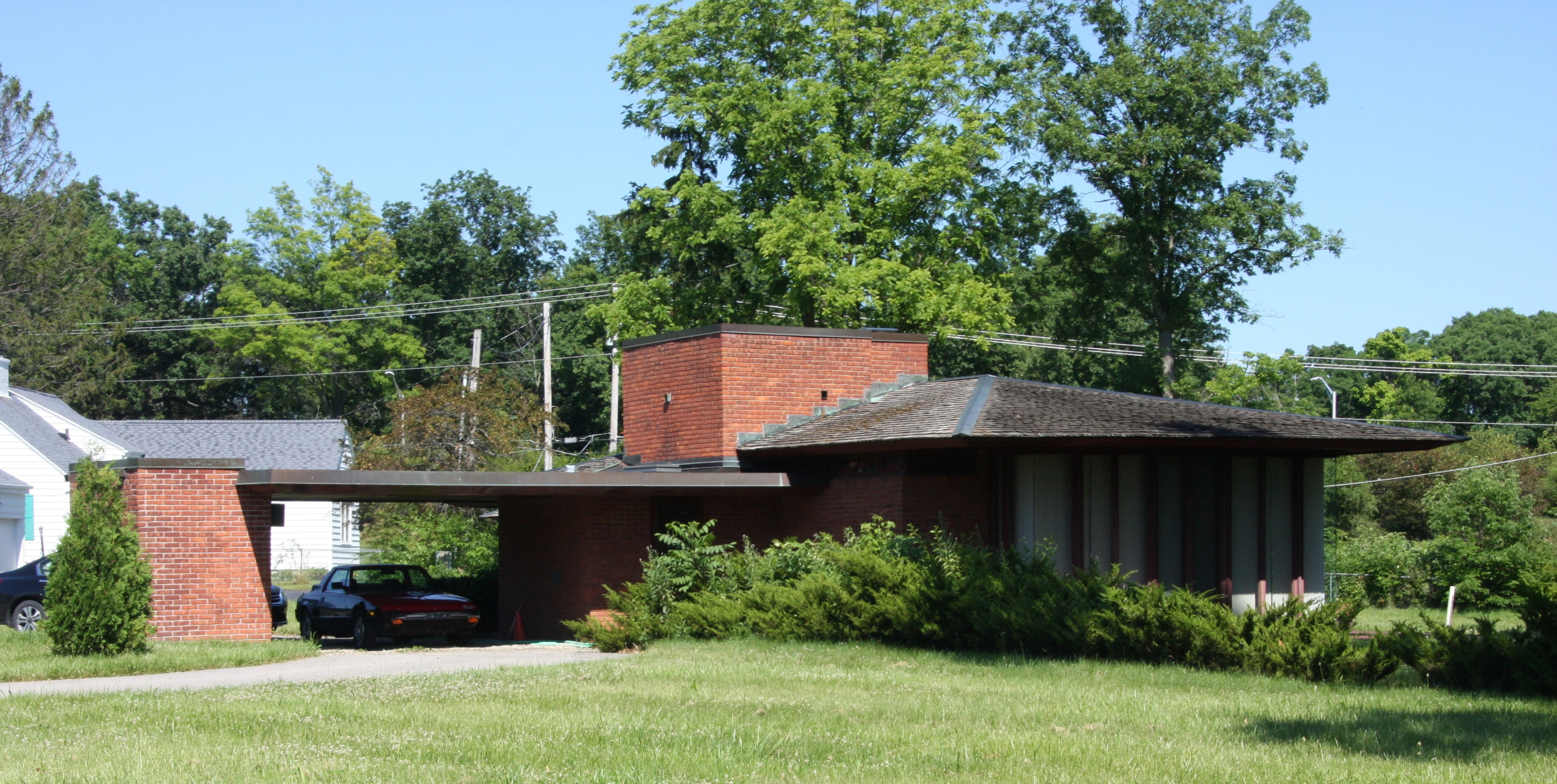
- The house in 2016

- Location within Indiana Location within the United States
- Location: 3901 North Washington Road, Fort Wayne, Indiana
- Coordinates: 41°4′14″N 85°11′27″W
- Area: 1 acre (0.40 ha)
- Built: 1952
- Architect: Frank Lloyd Wright
- Architectural style: Usonian
- NRHP reference No.: 04000635
- Added to NRHP: June 22, 2004

The John D. Haynes House is a house in Fort Wayne, Indiana, designed by Frank Lloyd Wright. The house is a small and modest Usonian design in glass, red tidewater cypress, and Chicago Common Brick on a red concrete slab.

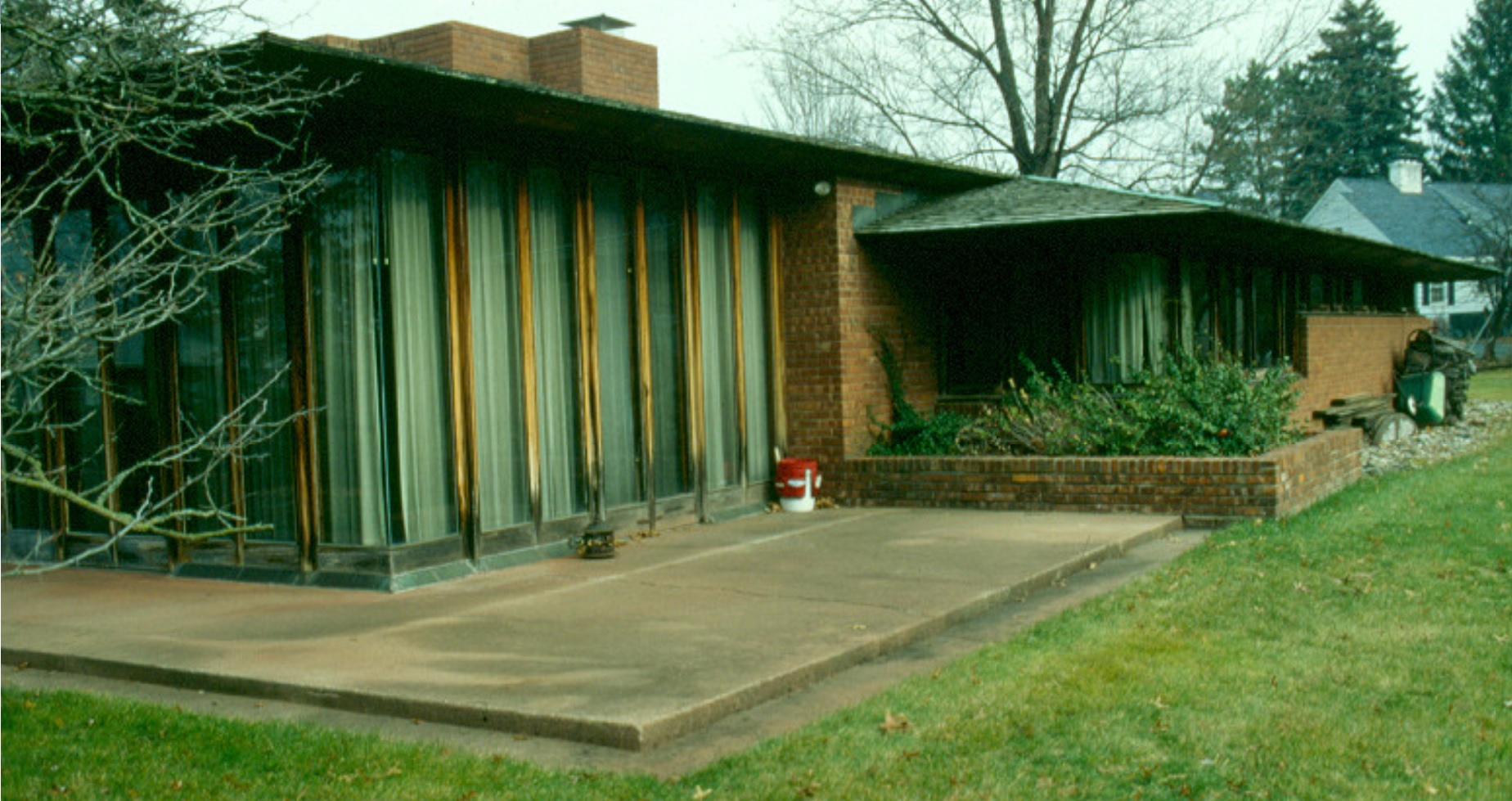
The back of the house

The gallery is offset to meet the rear of the great room at its center, rather than typically to one side. A music room and three bedrooms drop off this gallery. The plan thus generated is an outside T, with great room facing southwest and southeast, bedrooms looking southeast to the morning sun. The gabled roofing is asymmetrical.

The house was designed inside the original layout of the Wildwood Park development which was designed by the noted American landscape architect, Arthur Asahel Shurcliff. The house was listed on the National Register of Historic Places in 2004, and the Historic Preservation Review Board declared the property a Local Historic District in April 2008, at the request of the out-of-state owner. In 2010, the owner, Richard Herber, asked the Historic Preservation Review Board to rescind the historic designation, a request they rejected, citing his failure to explain his change of mind as a factor in their decision. In 2016, he sued the city council and historic preservation commission in U.S. federal court, but the case was dismissed in March 2017.

== See also ==
- List of Frank Lloyd Wright works
- National Register of Historic Places listings in Allen County, Indiana
