= St. Vincent Villa Historic District =

Historic district in Indiana, United States

- U.S. National Register of Historic Places
- U.S. Historic district
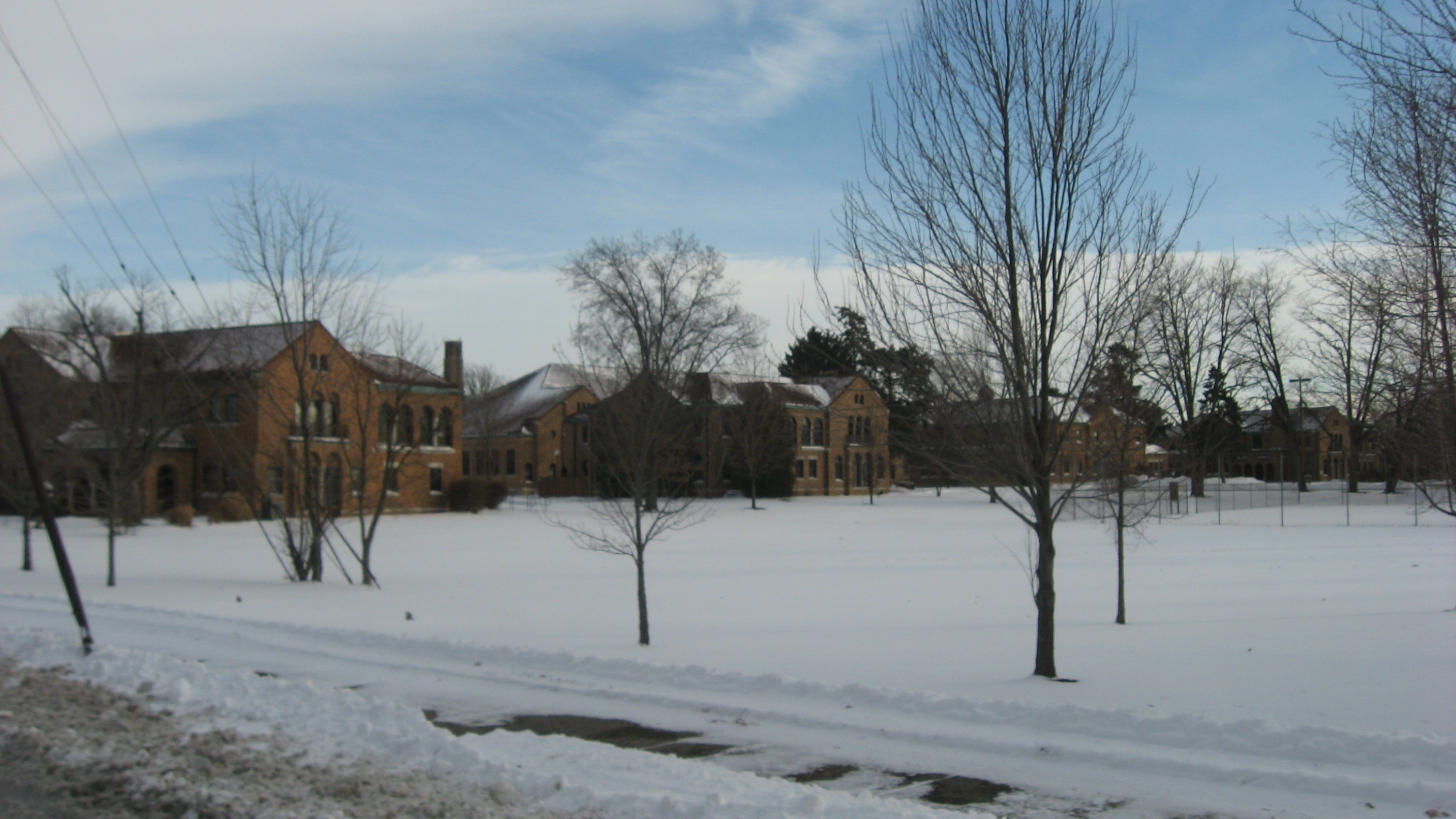
- St. Vincent Villa complex, January 2014

- Location within Indiana Location within the United States
- Location: 2000 N. Wells St., Fort Wayne, Indiana
- Coordinates: 41°05′35″N 85°08′39″W
- Area: 22.5 acres (9.1 ha)
- Built: 1932
- Built by: Buesching, Hagerman & Co.
- Architect: Strauss, A. M.
- Architectural style: Mission/spanish Revival, Romanesque, Bungalow/craftsman
- NRHP reference No.: 94000587
- Added to NRHP: June 10, 1994

St. Vincent Villa Historic District is a national historic district located at Fort Wayne, Indiana. The district encompasses nine contributing buildings and one contributing site associated with a Catholic orphanage. The buildings were constructed between 1932 and 1950–1951, and include notable examples of Mission Revival, Romanesque Revival, and Bungalow / American Craftsman style institutional architecture. They include the Main Building (1932), four cottages (1932, 1951), the Boiler House (1932), and two bungalows (c. 1925). The property was sold by the Roman Catholic Diocese of Fort Wayne–South Bend to the YWCA of Fort Wayne in the 1970s.

It was listed on the National Register of Historic Places in 1994.

in 1978 the property was purchased by the Fort Wayne YWCA and housed the largest women's shelter in Indiana. The property was put up for sale in 2004 and purchased by Imagine Schools LLC and occupied by their charter school. It was later occupied by the Horizon Christian Academy. The property was purchased on February 26, 2019, by Wallen Baptist Church of Fort Wayne, Indiana as a place of worship, to be restored and honored for its place in the history of Fort Wayne.
