= Oakdale Historic District (Fort Wayne, Indiana) =

Historic district in Indiana, United States

- U.S. National Register of Historic Places
- U.S. Historic district
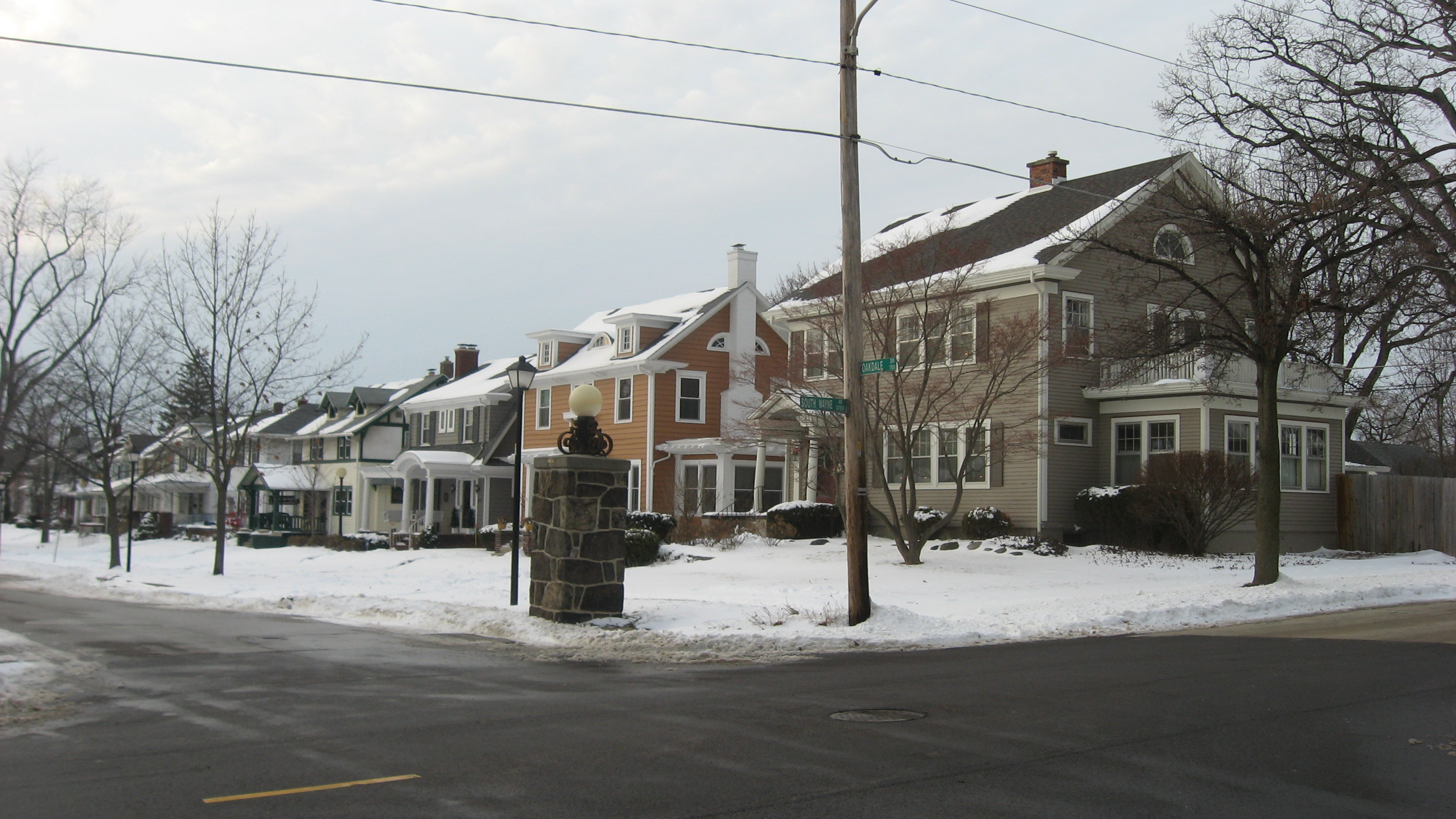
- Oakdale Drive, Oakdale Historic District, January 2014

- Location within Indiana Location within the United States
- Location: Roughly along Oakdale Dr. from Harrison St. to Broadway, Fort Wayne, Indiana
- Coordinates: 41°03′06″N 85°08′52″W
- Area: 47 acres (19 ha)
- Architect: Strauss, Alvin M.; Larrimore, Lloyd
- Architectural style: Colonial Revival, Bungalow/craftsman, et.al.
- NRHP reference No.: 00001132
- Added to NRHP: September 22, 2000

Oakdale Historic District is a national historic district located at Fort Wayne, Indiana. The district encompasses 334 contributing buildings and 38 contributing objects in a predominantly residential section of Fort Wayne. The area was developed between about 1915 and 1930, and includes notable examples of Colonial Revival, American Four Square, and Bungalow / American Craftsman style residential architecture. The contributing objects are entry markers and streetlamps.

It was listed on the National Register of Historic Places in 2000.
