= Louis Mohr Block =

- U.S. National Register of Historic Places
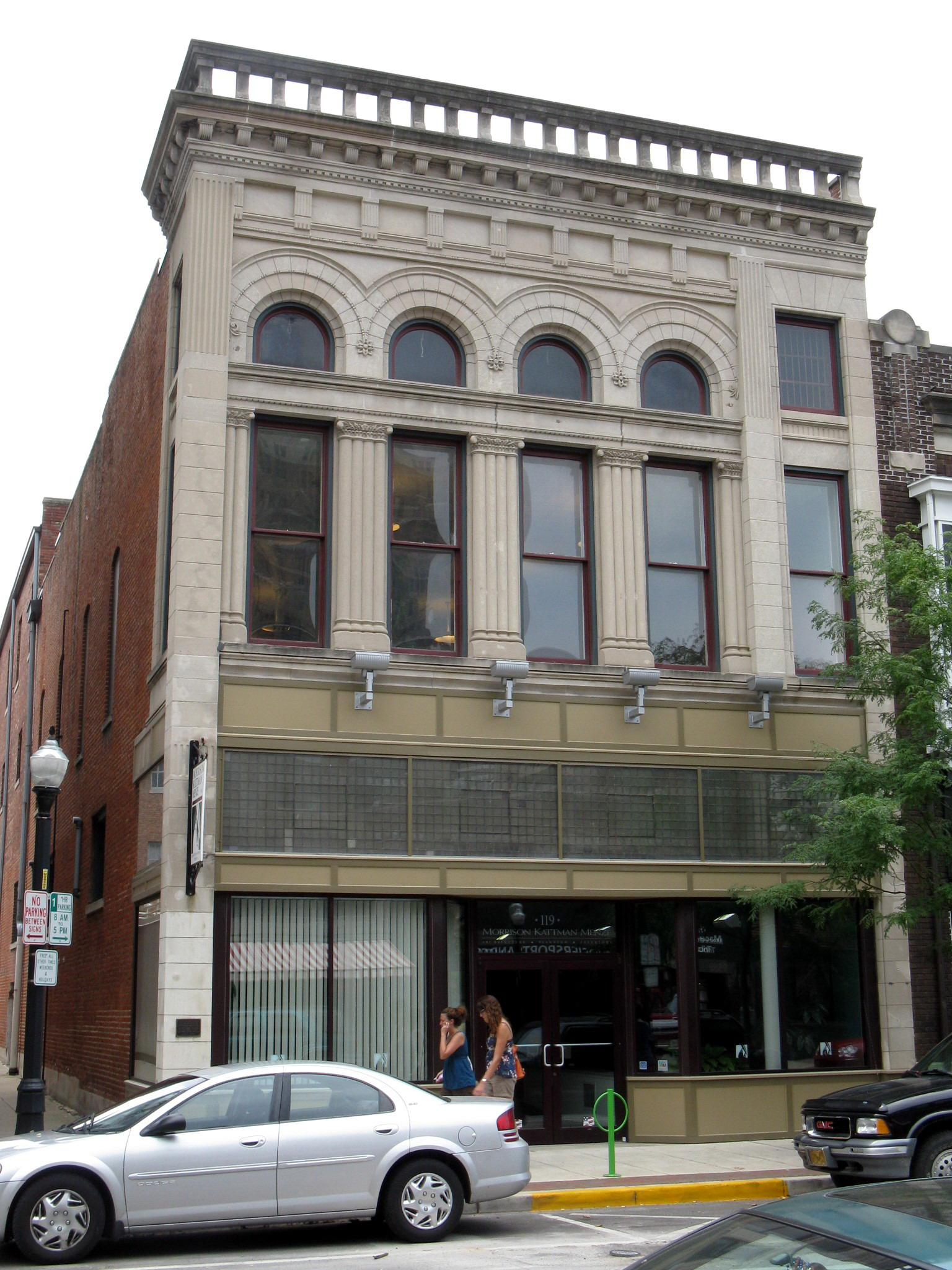
- Mohr Block, July 2010

- Location within Indiana Location within the United States
- Location: 119 W. Wayne St., Fort Wayne, Indiana
- Coordinates: 41°4′41″N 85°8′24″W
- Area: less than one acre
- Built: 1891, 1926, 1963
- Architect: Kendrick, Frank B.; Rammel, William V.
- Architectural style: Richardsonian Romanesque
- NRHP reference No.: 88001222
- Added to NRHP: August 26, 1988

Louis Mohr Block is a historic commercial building located in downtown Fort Wayne, Indiana. It was built in 1891, and is a two-story, five-bay, Richardsonian Romanesque style brick building with a three-story rear addition erected in 1926. The front facade features cut limestone cladding on the upper part and round arch windows. The building was remodeled in 1963. For many years the building housed a women's clothing store, The Vogue.

It was listed on the National Register of Historic Places in 1988.
