= Fort Wayne Printing Company Building =

- U.S. National Register of Historic Places
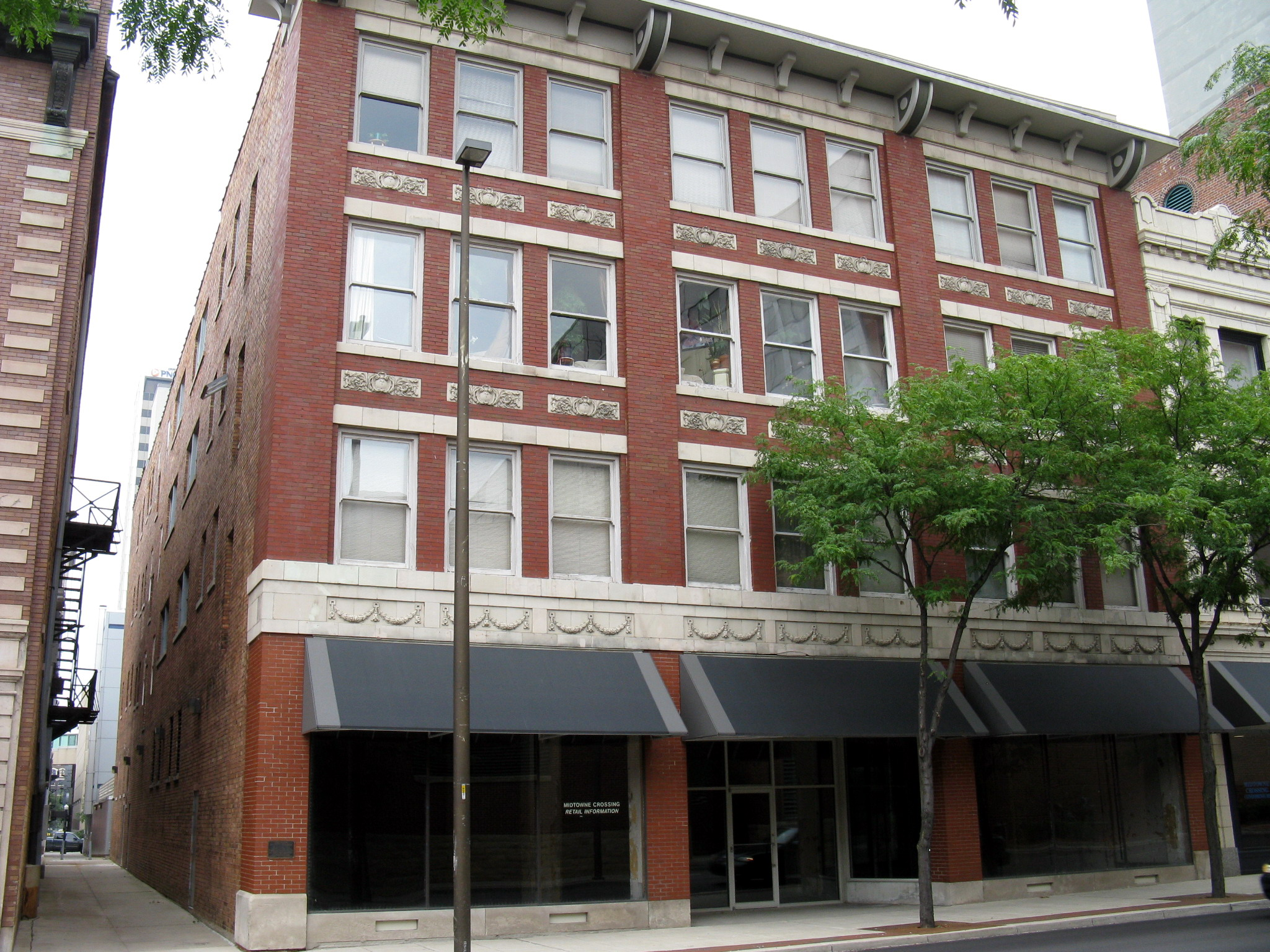
- Fort Wayne Printing Company Building, July 2010

- Location within Indiana Location within the United States
- Location: 114 W. Washington St., Fort Wayne, Indiana
- Coordinates: 41°4′38″N 85°8′23″W
- Area: less than one acre
- Built: 1911
- Architect: Snyder, Ralph B.
- Architectural style: Classical Revival
- NRHP reference No.: 88001220
- Added to NRHP: August 24, 1988

Fort Wayne Printing Company Building is a historic commercial building located in downtown Fort Wayne, Indiana. It was built in 1911, and is a four-story, three-bay, Classical Revival style brick building with white terra cotta trim.

It was listed on the National Register of Historic Places in 1988.
