= The Landing Historic District =

Historic district in Indiana, United States

- U.S. National Register of Historic Places
- U.S. Historic district
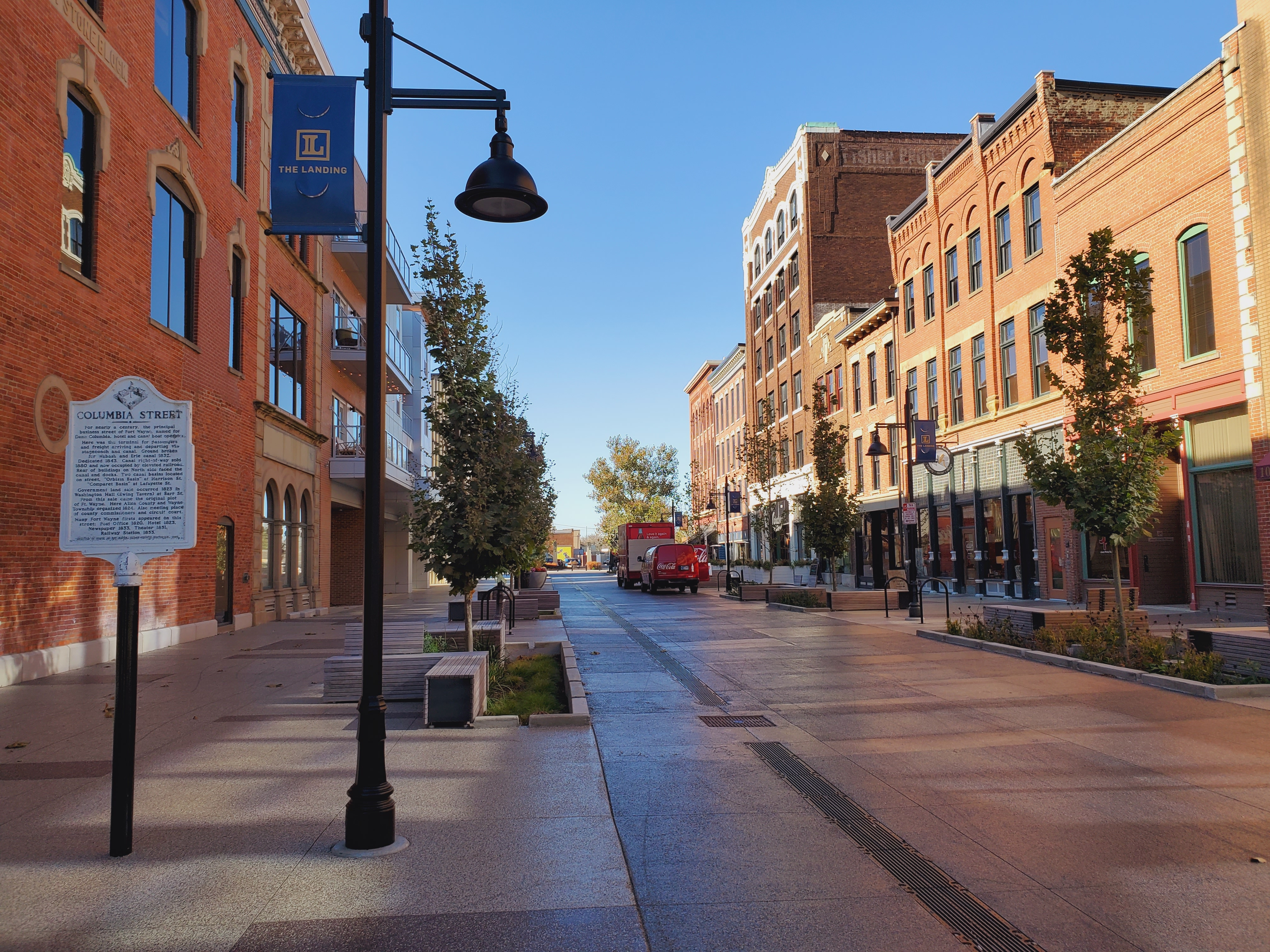
- The Landing Historic District in 2020

- Location within Indiana Location within the United States
- Location: Roughly bounded by Calhoun, Harrison, Dock and Pearl Sts. and the alley between Columbia and Main Sts., Fort Wayne, Indiana
- Coordinates: 41°04′52″N 85°08′29″W
- Area: 4.9 acres (2.0 ha)
- Built: 1881
- Architect: Kendrick, Charles E.
- Architectural style: Renaissance, Italianate, Romanesque
- NRHP reference No.: 93000953
- Added to NRHP: September 16, 1993

The Landing Historic District is a national historic district located at Fort Wayne, Indiana. The district encompasses 18 contributing buildings and 1 contributing structure in the central business district of Fort Wayne. The area was developed between about 1868 and 1943, and includes notable examples of Renaissance Revival, Romanesque Revival, and Italianate style commercial architecture. Located in the district is the separately listed Randall Building. Other notable buildings include the Keystone Block, Fisher Brothers Paper Building (1914), The Bash Building (1895), and The Pinex Company Building (1917).

It was listed on the National Register of Historic Places in 1993.
