= Alexander Taylor Rankin House =

Historic house in Indiana, United States

- U.S. National Register of Historic Places
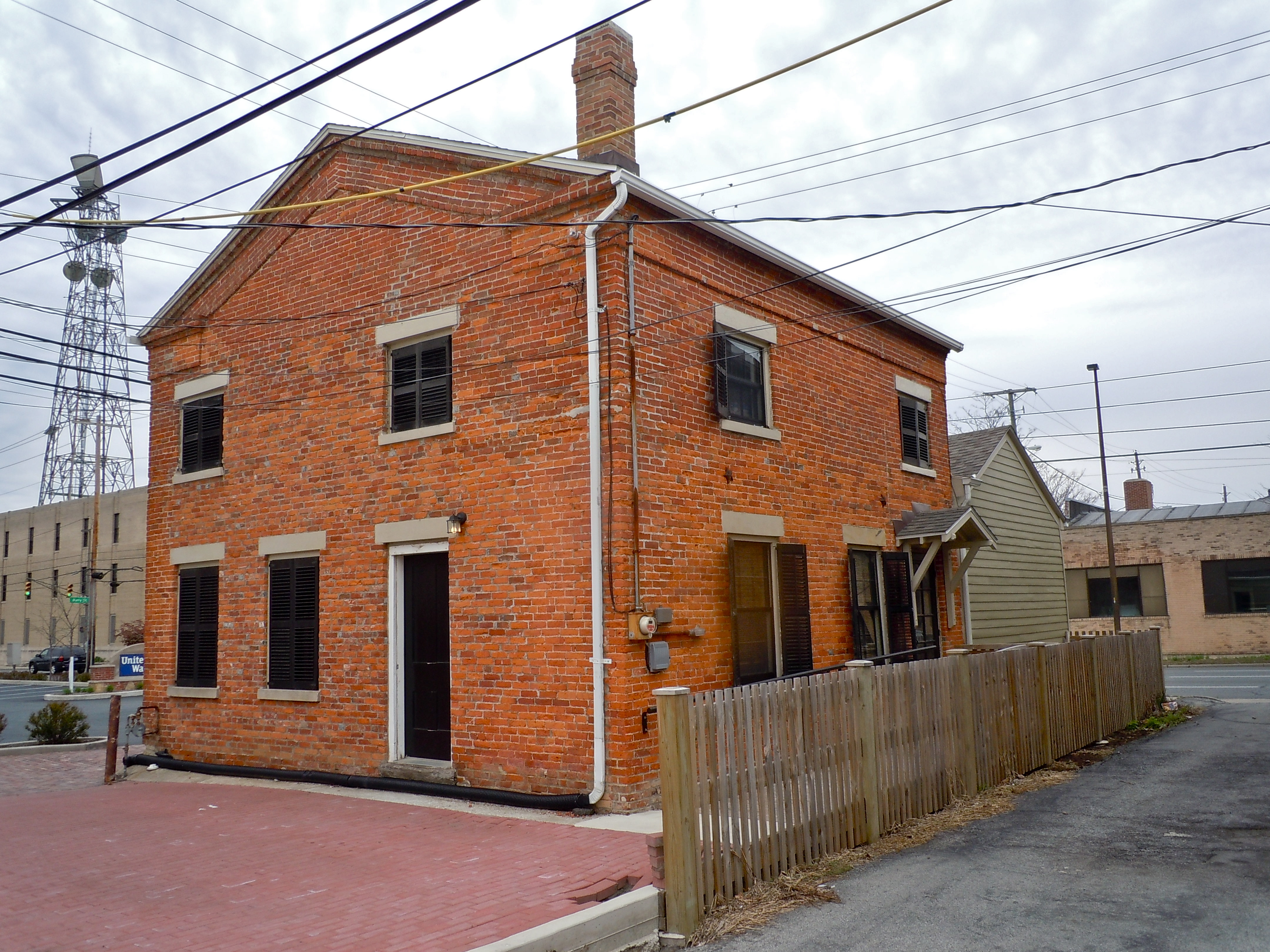
- Alexander Taylor Rankin House, April 2011

- Location within Indiana Location within the United States
- Location: 818 S. Lafayette St., Fort Wayne, Indiana
- Coordinates: 41°4′53″N 85°8′5″W
- Area: less than one acre
- Built: c. 1841, c. 1855
- Architectural style: Greek Revival, Hall and Parlor
- NRHP reference No.: 04001317
- Added to NRHP: December 6, 2004

Alexander Taylor Rankin House, also known as the Maier-DeWood Residence, is a historic home located in downtown Fort Wayne, Indiana. It was built about 1841, and is a 1 1/2-story, three bay by two bay, Greek Revival style brick dwelling. A one-story frame addition was erected around 1855.

It was listed on the National Register of Historic Places in 2004.
