= Randall Building (Fort Wayne, Indiana) =

- U.S. National Register of Historic Places
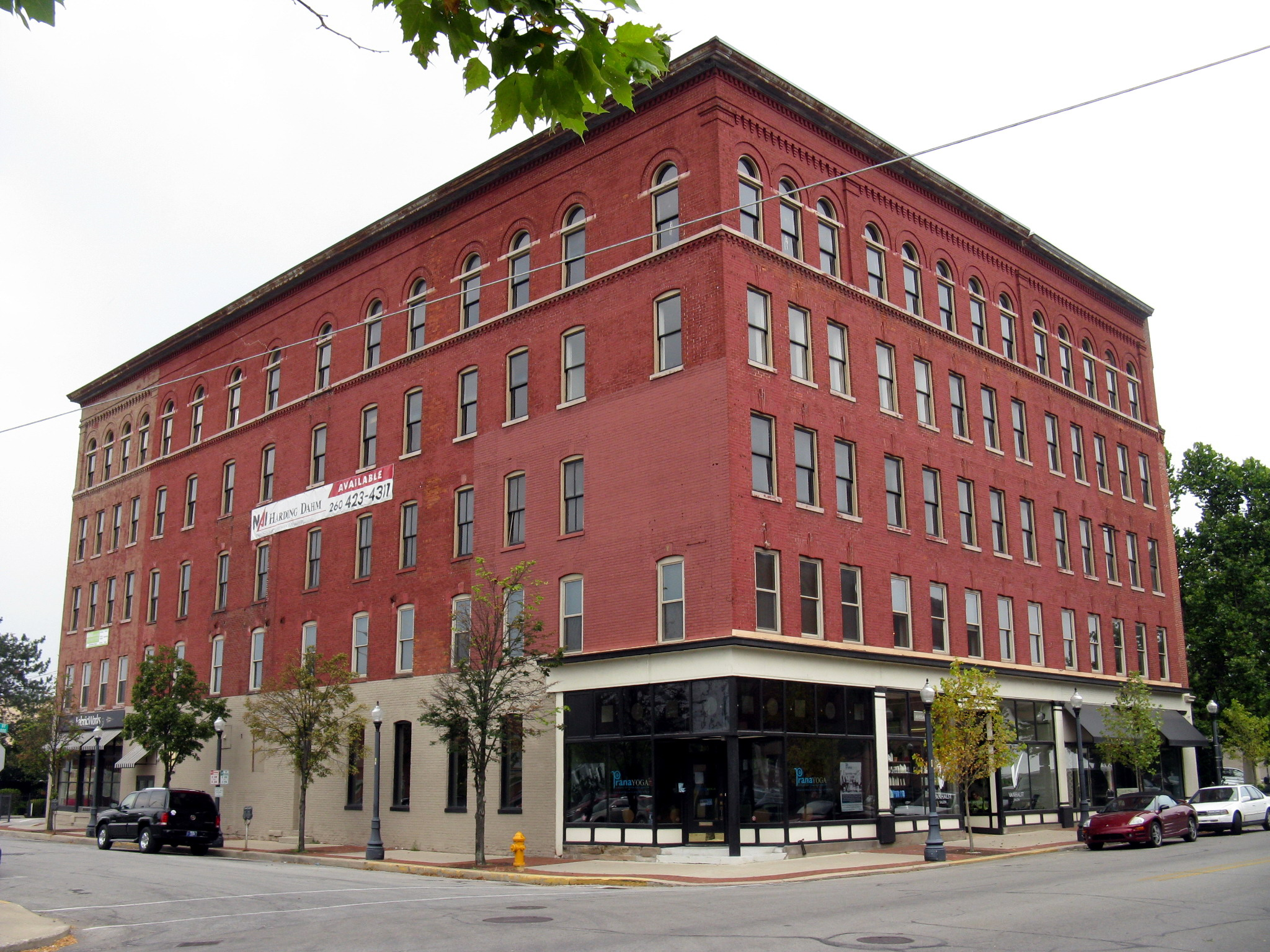
- Randall Building, July 2010

- Location within Indiana Location within the United States
- Location: 616 and 618 South Harrison Street, Fort Wayne, Indiana
- Coordinates: 41°4′52″N 85°8′33″W
- Area: less than one acre
- Built: 1905
- Architectural style: Renaissance
- NRHP reference No.: 90001786
- Added to NRHP: December 7, 1990

Randall Building, originally an extension of the Randall Hotel, is a historic commercial building located in "The Landing" section of downtown Fort Wayne, Indiana. It was built in 1905, and is a large five-story, Renaissance Revival style brick building. For many years the building was occupied by Seavey Hardware.

It was listed on the National Register of Historic Places in 1990.
