= Foster Park Neighborhood Historic District =

Historic district in Indiana, United States

- U.S. National Register of Historic Places
- U.S. Historic district
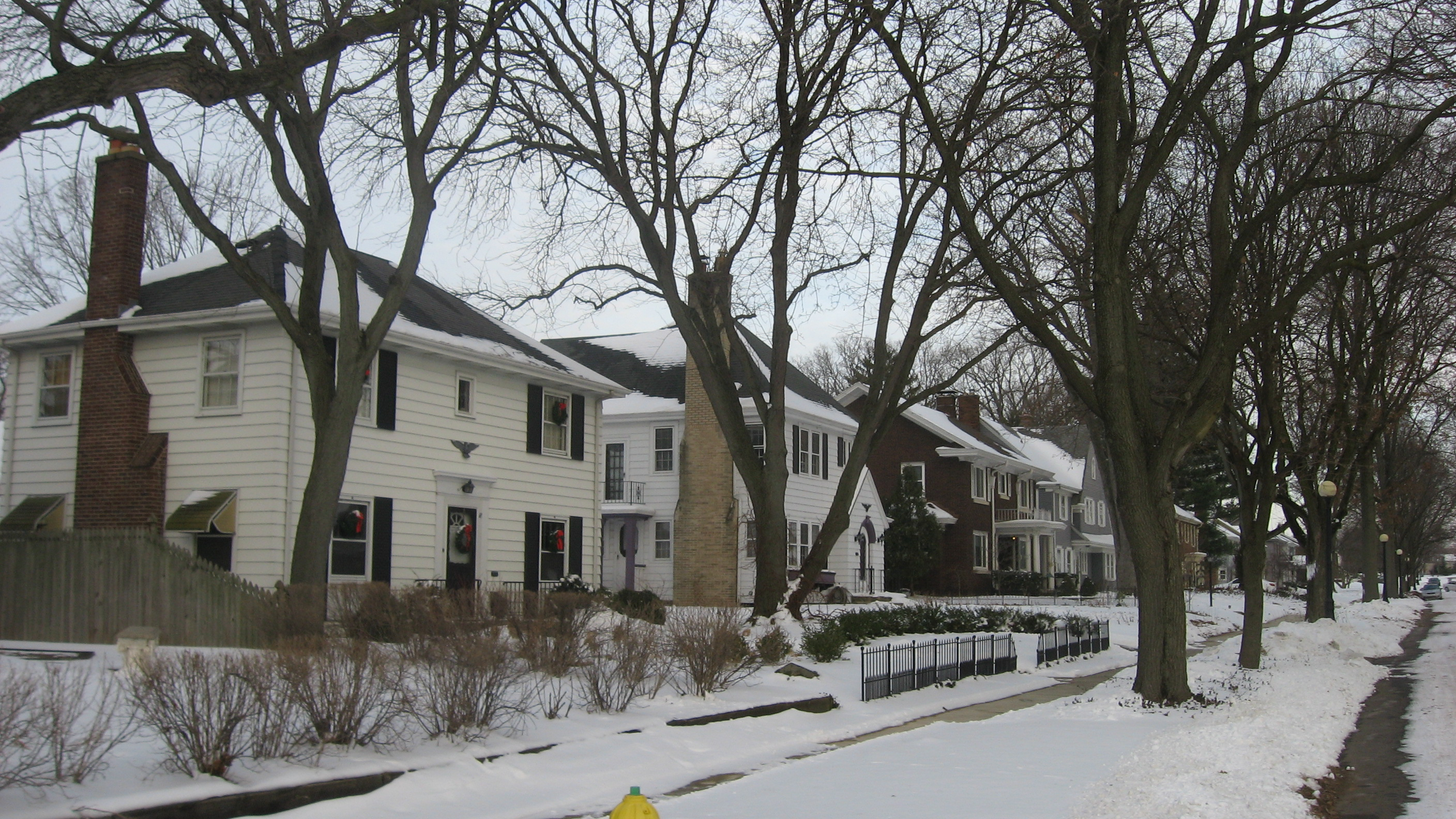
- Foster Park Neighborhood Historic District, January 2014

- Location within Indiana Location within the United States
- Location: Roughly bounded by Old Mill Rd., Rudisell Blvd., Kimmel Dr. & Lexington Ave., Fort Wayne, Indiana
- Coordinates: 41°02′52″N 85°09′20″W
- Area: 150 acres (61 ha)
- Built: c. 1924-1963
- Architect: Hilgeman & Schaaf
- Architectural style: Tudor Revival, Colonial Revival, Bungalow / craftsman, Minimal Traditional and Ranch et al.
- MPS: Park and Boulevard System of Fort Wayne, Indiana MPS; Historic Residential Suburbs in the United States, 1820-1960 MPD
- NRHP reference No.: 13000755
- Added to NRHP: September 25, 2013

Foster Park Neighborhood Historic District is a national historic district located at Fort Wayne, Indiana, USA. The district encompasses 222 contributing buildings in a predominantly residential section of Fort Wayne. The area was developed from about 1924 to 1963, and includes notable examples of Colonial Revival, Tudor Revival and Bungalow / American Craftsman style residential architecture. The neighborhood was platted and designed by Hilgeman & Schaaf.

It was listed on the National Register of Historic Places in 2013.
