= Fort Wayne Old City Hall Building =

- Fort Wayne City Hall
- U.S. National Register of Historic Places
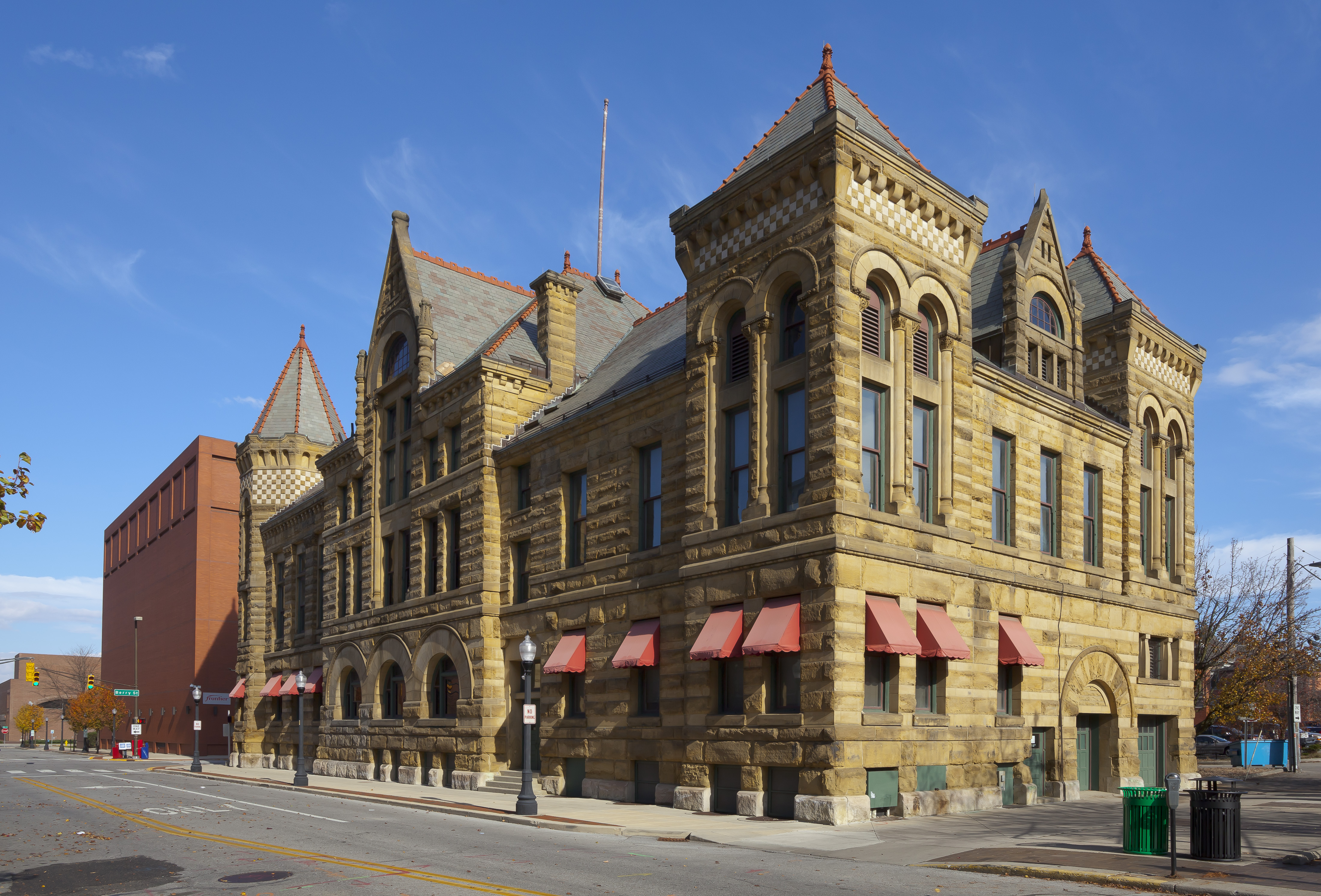
- Though once functioning as Fort Wayne's City Hall, the building now houses The History Center

- Location within Indiana Location within the United States
- Location: 302 East Berry Street, Fort Wayne, Indiana
- Coordinates: 41°4′46.13″N 85°8′10.67″W
- Area: 1 acre (0.40 ha)
- Built: 1893
- Architect: Wing & Mahurin
- Architectural style: Richardsonian Romanesque
- NRHP reference No.: 73000027
- Added to NRHP: June 4, 1973

The Fort Wayne Old City Hall Building in downtown Fort Wayne, Indiana operates as a museum known as The History Center, and has served as headquarters for the Allen County–Fort Wayne Historical Society since 1980. The Richardsonian Romanesque style sandstone building was designed by the architectural firm Wing & Mahurin and built in 1893. It served as a functioning city hall for the city until 1971 when local officials moved to the City-County Building.

It was listed on the National Register of Historic Places in 1973.

The History Center has collected 32,000 artifacts and shows many of them in permanent displays dedicated to the region's history, dating from the Ice Age to the 18th century to present.

The Society also owns the National Historic Landmark Chief Jean Baptiste de Richardville House and the Historic Barr Street Market.

== Exhibits ==
- Shaping the Confluence: includes the following

Earliest Inhabitants, tools, weapons, a mastodon's broken rib bone and large tooth are displayed.

Miami Indian History, images of Pacanne, Little Turtle, and Jean Baptiste de Richardville, all chiefs of the Miami, displayed, along with collections on the Miami Indian capital, Kekionga. Miami chief Little Turtle's items displayed include a sword presented to him by President George Washington. Exhibit also includes a model of a typical 18th-century Miami village.

Anthony Wayne, exhibits the birth of Fort Wayne with General "Mad" Anthony Wayne's ordering of a fort to be built at the three rivers, October 22, 1794.

An Emerging City, includes a model of and parts of the Wabash and Erie Canal, attributed to turning the city into a boom-town in the 19th century.

- Industry & Transportation, includes a recreation of a blacksmith shop, foundry and discusses Fort Wayne's long association with the railroads.
- Innovation & Technology, a new gallery opened in 2012, features a number of the products that were created and produced by entrepreneurs in Fort Wayne and Allen County.
- Old City Jail, This section of the Old City Hall building housed the Police Department. There were offices, an interrogation room, a garage for vehicles, and most notably the City Jail and booking area. This small jail was in operation from 1893 to 1971 and was mostly used as a temporary holding area for those awaiting trial.

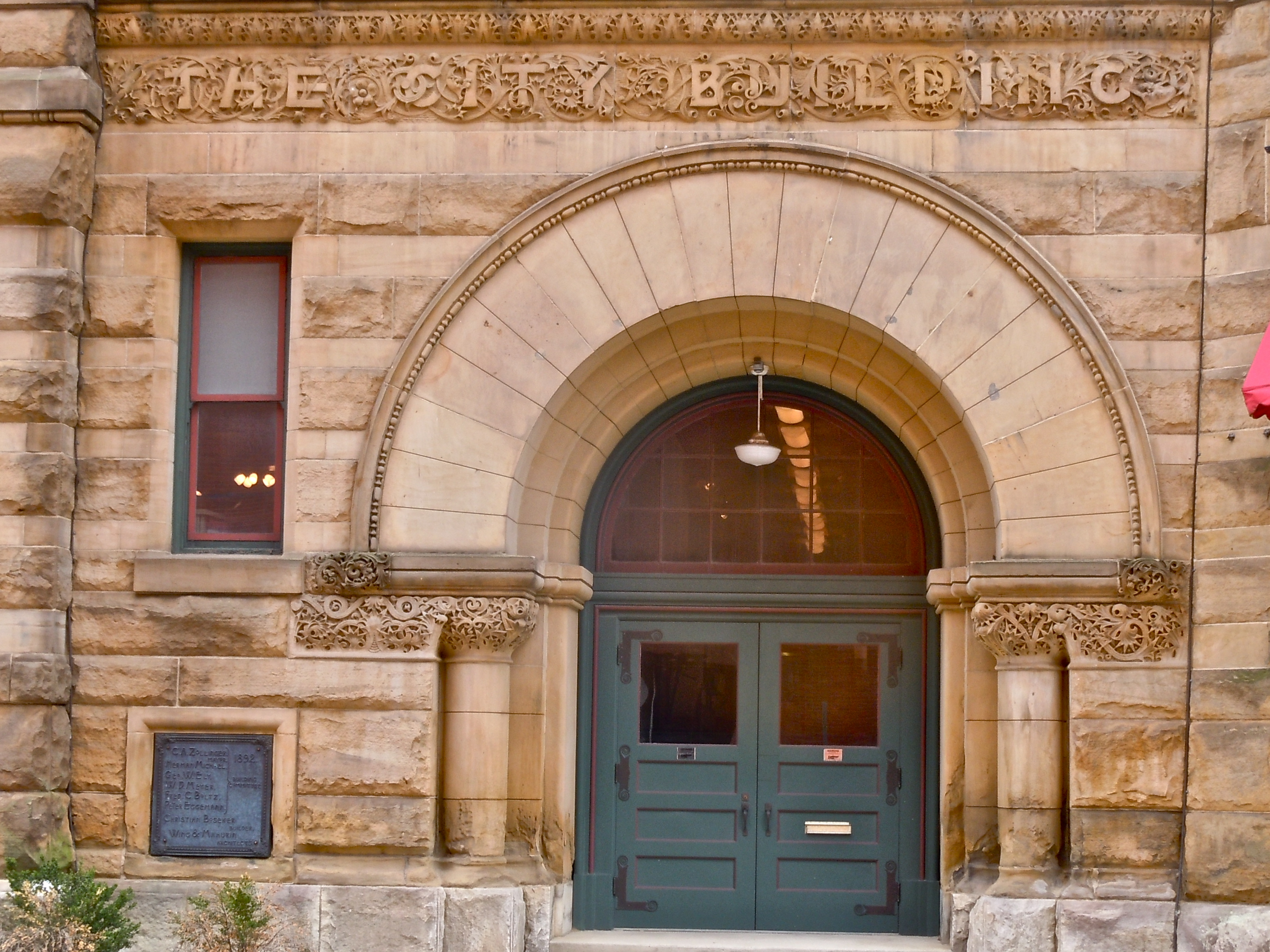
Original 1893 Entrance

== See also ==
- List of museums in Indiana
- National Register of Historic Places listings in Allen County, Indiana
