= Harry A. Keplinger House =

Historic house in Indiana, United States

- U.S. National Register of Historic Places
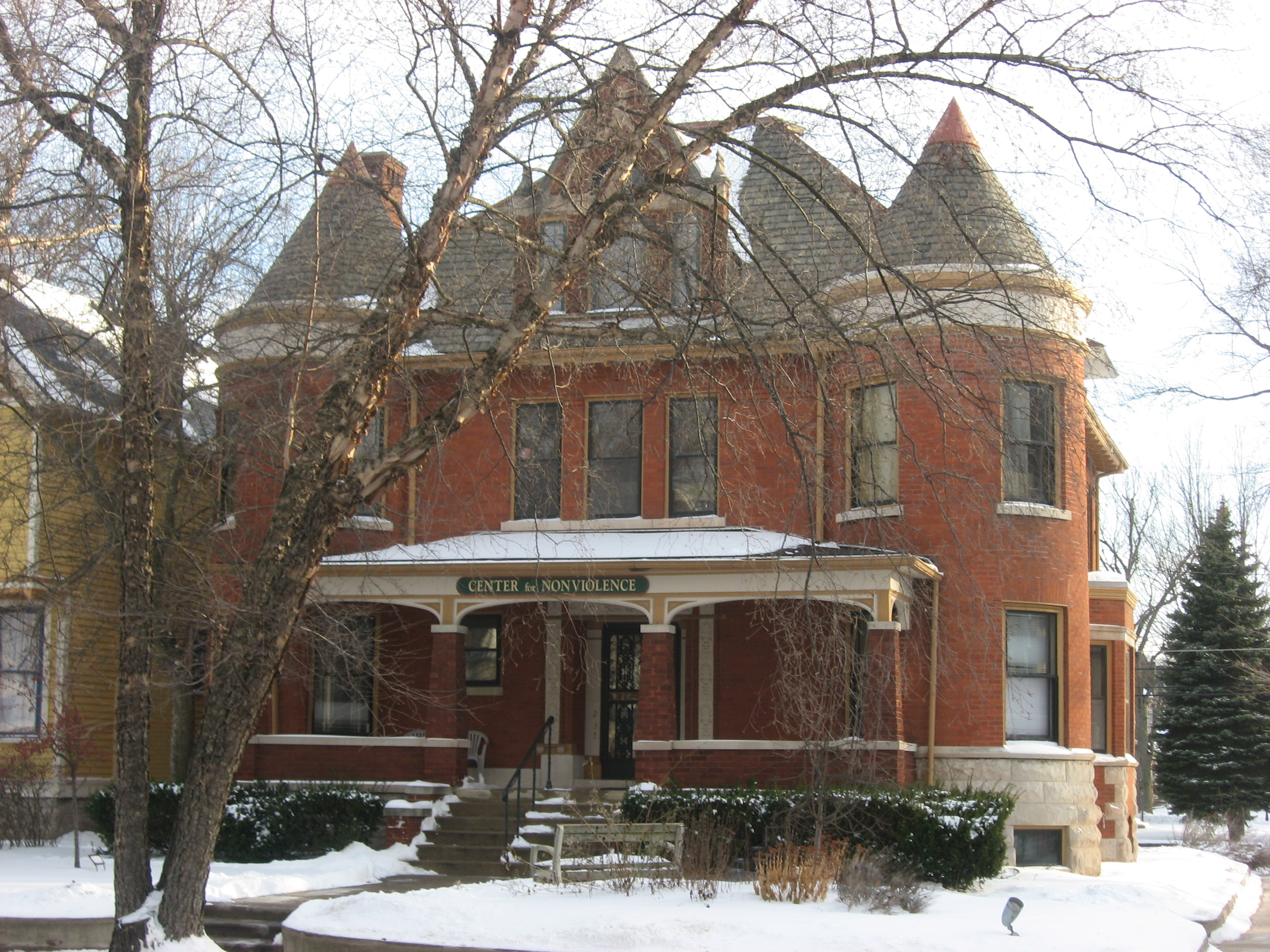
- Harry A. Keplinger House, January 2014

- Location within Indiana Location within the United States
- Location: 235 W. Creighton Ave., Fort Wayne, Indiana
- Coordinates: 41°3′51″N 85°8′25″W
- Area: less than one acre
- Built: c. 1893
- Architectural style: Romanesque, Richardsonian Romanesque
- NRHP reference No.: 83000048
- Added to NRHP: September 1, 1983

Harry A. Keplinger House is a historic home located at Fort Wayne, Indiana. It was built about 1893, and is a 2 1/2-story, Richardsonian Romanesque style brick dwelling with a rock-faced stone foundation. It features a steeply pitched roof and dormers, round two-story towers at each of the front corners with conical roofs, and a one-story front porch connecting the two towers. It was built by Harry A. Keplinger, a prominent turn-of-the-20th century businessman.

It was listed on the National Register of Historic Places in 1983.
