= Kresge–Groth Building =

- Kresge-–Groth Building
- U.S. National Register of Historic Places
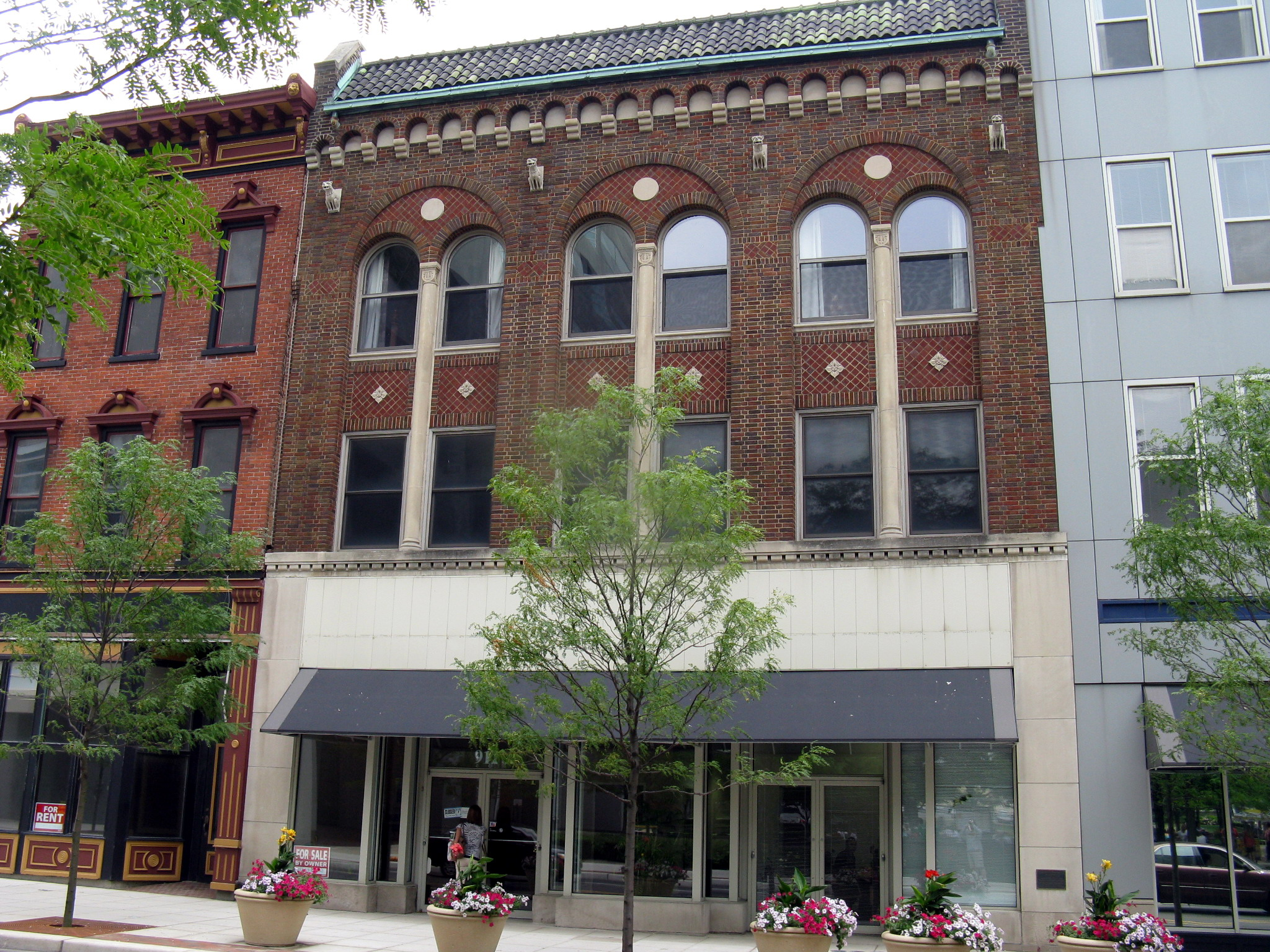
- Kresge–Groth Building, July 2010

- Location within Indiana Location within the United States
- Location: 914 S. Calhoun St., Fort Wayne, Indiana
- Coordinates: 41°4′41″N 85°8′22″W
- Area: less than one acre
- Built: 1926
- Architect: Holmes, Harold
- Architectural style: Late 19th And 20th Century Revivals, Mission/spanish Revival
- NRHP reference No.: 88001223
- Added to NRHP: August 25, 1988

Kresge–Groth Building is a historic commercial building located in downtown Fort Wayne, Indiana. It was built in 1926, and is a three-story, three-bay, Spanish Colonial Revival style brick building. The front facade features three round-topped wall arches and two-story engaged limestone columns. The building originally housed the S. S. Kresge Company and after 1933 the Earl Groth Company. It was occupied by from 1964 to 1971 by Walgreen Drug Store.

It was listed on the National Register of Historic Places in 1988.
