= Illsley Place–West Rudisill Historic District =

Historic district in Indiana, United States

- U.S. National Register of Historic Places
- U.S. Historic district
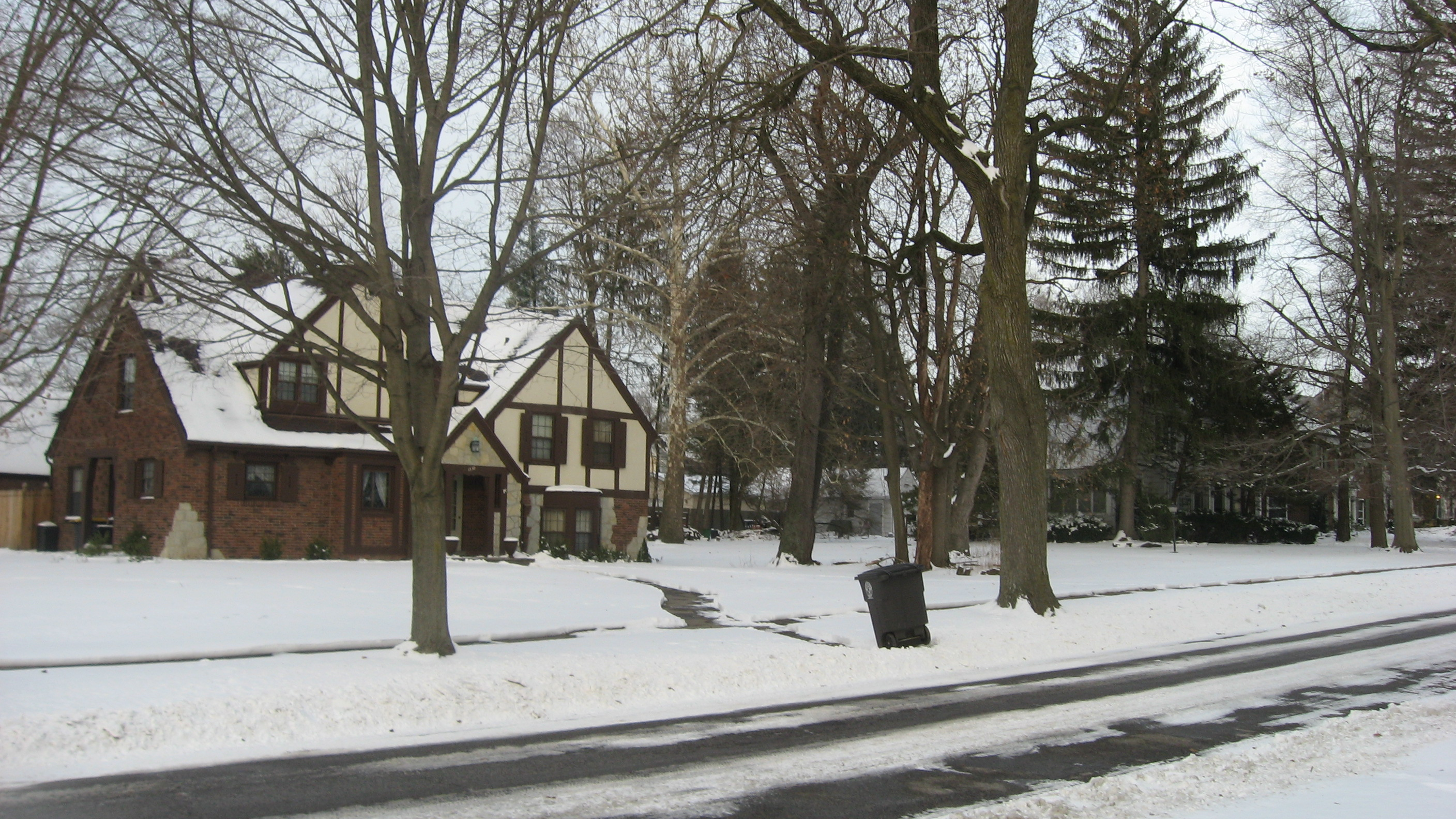
- Illsley Place–West Rudisill Historic District, January 2014

- Location within Indiana Location within the United States
- Location: Roughly bounded by Broadway, W. Rudisill Blvd., Beaver Ave, and the alley N of Illsley Dr., Fort Wayne, Indiana
- Coordinates: 41°03′03″N 85°09′15″W
- Area: 25 acres (10 ha)
- Architect: Strauss, Alvin M.; Ninde, Joel Roberts
- Architectural style: Italianate, Colonial Revival, et al.
- NRHP reference No.: 06000310
- Added to NRHP: April 20, 2006

The Illsley Place–West Rudisill Historic District is a national historic district in Fort Wayne, Indiana. The district encompasses 63 buildings and 1 structure in a predominantly residential section of Fort Wayne. The area was developed from about 1887 to 1955 and includes notable examples of the Colonial Revival, Tudor Revival, Bungalow / American Craftsman, and Italianate styles of residential architecture.

It was listed on the National Register of Historic Places in 2006.
