= Charles Mulford Robinson =

American journalist

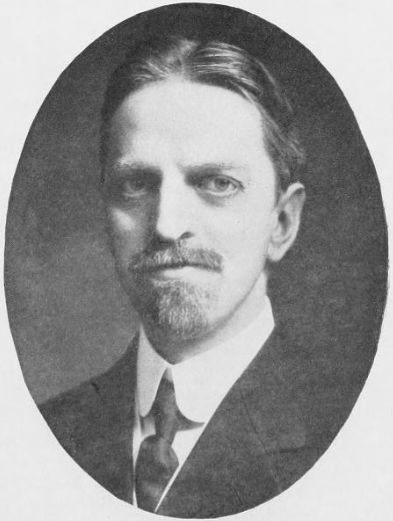
- Born: April 30, 1869; Ramapo, New York, US
- Died: December 30, 1917 (aged 48); Albany, New York, US
- Education: University of Rochester
- Occupation: Journalist
- Spouse: Eliza Ten Eyck Pruyn (m. 1896)

Charles Mulford Robinson (1869–1917) was an American journalist and a writer who became famous as a pioneering urban planning theorist. He has the greatest influence as a missionary for urban beautification. He was the first Professor for Civic Design at University of Illinois at Urbana-Champaign, which was only one of two universities offering courses in urban planning at the time, the other being Harvard.

== Biography ==
Charles Mulford Robinson was born in Ramapo, New York on April 30, 1869. He earned a bachelor's degree at the University of Rochester in 1891.

Robinson wrote "The Fair as a Spectacle" in 1893, an illustrated description of Chicago's World Columbian Exposition, a watershed event for the City Beautiful Movement, and went on to write the first guide to city planning in 1901, titled The Improvement of Towns and Cities.

He married Eliza Ten Eyck Pruyn in 1896.

In 1909, he developed the original plans for the Fort Wayne Park and Boulevard System in Fort Wayne, Indiana. He was hired in 1910 to review the city design and planning of St. Joseph, Missouri. Fully half of his report dealt with the need for park space in the city, leading to the design of the National Register of Historic Places–listed St. Joseph Park and Parkway System.

Robinson died in Albany, New York on December 30, 1917.

== Works ==
- "The Fair as a Spectacle". A History of the World's Columbian Exposition. New York, D. Applelton and Company. 1893. Chapter 26.
- "Improvement in City Life". Atlantic Monthly. 83. 1899.
  - 1: Philanthropic Progress
  - 2: Educational Progress
  - 3: Aesthetic Progress
- Rochester Ways. Scrantom Wetmore & Company, Rochester, New York, 1900.
- The Improvement of Towns and Cities. Or the Practical Basic of Civic Aesthetics. Putnam's Sons, New York, 1901.
- Modern Civic Art, or the City Made Beautiful. G.P. Putnam's Sons, New York, 1903.
- The Call of the City. Paul Elder & Company, San Francisco/New York, 1908.
- City Planning. G.P. Putnam's Sons, New York, 1916.
