= Trinity Episcopal Church (Fort Wayne, Indiana) =

Historic church in Indiana, United States

- U.S. National Register of Historic Places
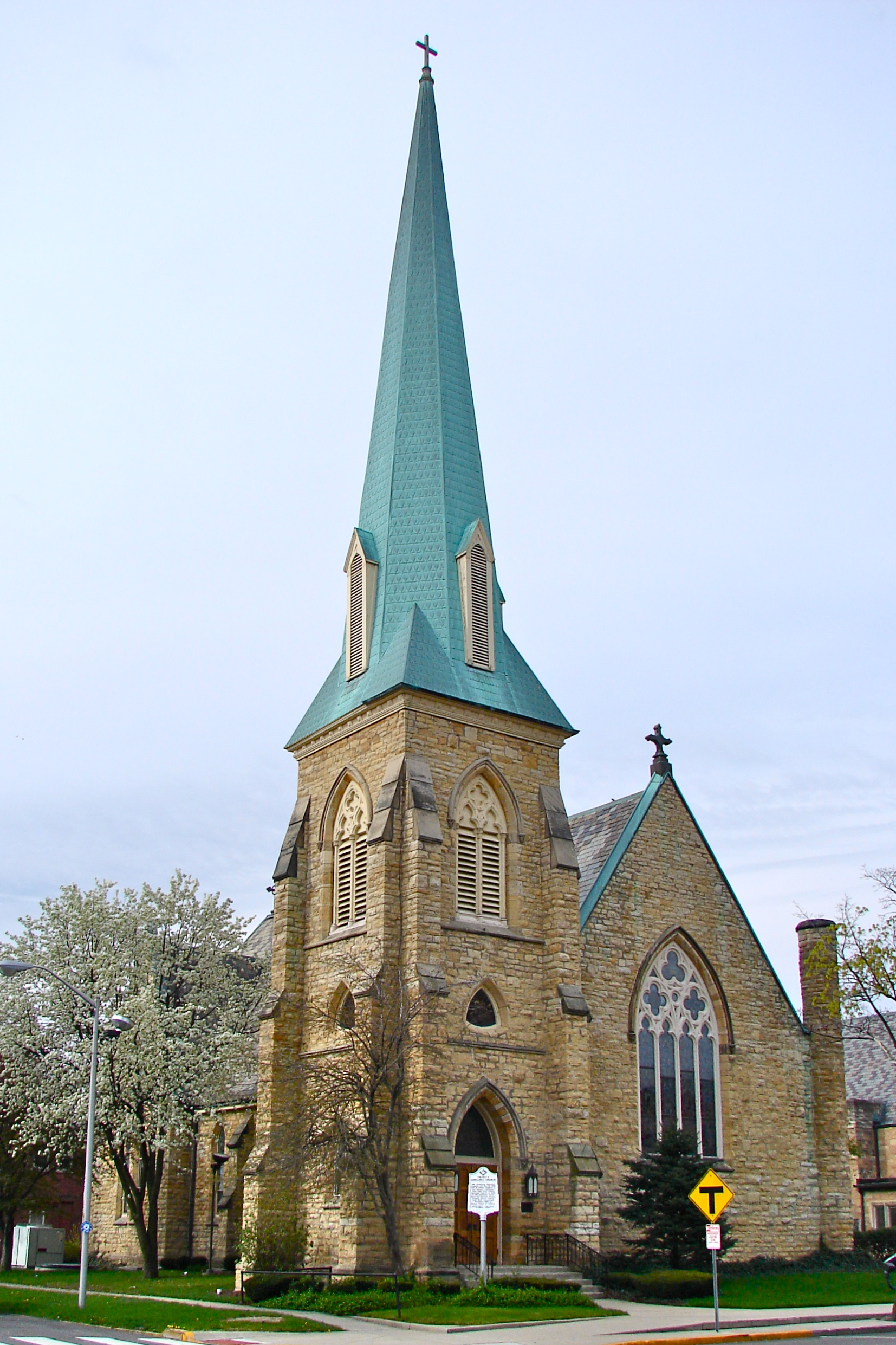

- Location within Indiana Location within the United States
- Location: 611 West Berry Street, Fort Wayne, Indiana
- Coordinates: 41°4′40″N 85°8′52″W
- Area: less than one acre
- Built: 1865
- Architect: C.C. Miller
- Architectural style: Gothic Revival
- NRHP reference No.: 78000044
- Added to NRHP: September 13, 1978

Trinity Episcopal Church is a historic Episcopal congregation and church, designed by Toledo, Ohio architect Charles Crosby Miller and constructed ca. 1865 in Fort Wayne, Indiana. The congregation was organized in 1839 as Christ Church and the name changed in 1844 to Trinity Church. The first church was built on the southeast corner of Berry and Harrison Streets in 1848. It is an example of Gothic Revival architecture.

The church reported 354 members in 2015 and 471 members in 2023; no membership statistics were reported in 2024 parochial reports. Plate and pledge income reported for the congregation in 2024 was $420,451. Average Sunday attendance (ASA) in 2024 was 160 persons.

The building was listed on the National Register of Historic Places in 1978.

== History ==
The Rt. Rev. Jackson Kemper, Bishop of the Northwest, visited Fort Wayne for the first time in 1837 in an effort to organize a church. Two years later, he set the Rev. Benjamin Hutchins, formerly of Philadelphia, to organize a church, and Christ Episcopal Church was formally established on May 26, 1839. The congregation languished when Hutchins departed soon after, and in 1844, Peter P. Bailey, a businessman from New York City, began offering lay readings from the Book of Common Prayer. Bishop Kemper sent another missionary, the Rev. Benjamin Halsted, and on May 25, 1844, Trinity Episcopal Church was formally organized. After meeting initially in the Allen County Courthouse, the church raised funds for a wood framed chapel at the southeast corner of Berry and Harrison. (The present historical marker is inaccurate about its location).

In 1863, the vestry called the Rev. Joseph S. Large to lead an effort to build a new Gothic Revival Church under a design by Charles Crosby Miller of Toledo, Ohio. After many delays and financial shortfalls, the building was completed in the fall of 1866 and consecrated two years later by the Rt. Rev. Joseph C. Talbot, Bishop Coadjutor of Indiana.

Trinity Church has had the following rectors:

- Rev. Benjamin Halsted, 1844–1846
- Rev. Joseph S. Large, 1848–1854
- Rev. Caleb Alexander Bruce, 1854–1855
- Rev. Eugene Charles Pattison, 1856–1858
- Rev. Stephen Henry Battin, 1858–1863
- Rev. Joseph S. Large, 1863–1872
- Rev. Colin Campbell Tate, 1872–1879
- Rev. William Naylor Webbe, 1879–1888
- Rev. Alexander Washington Seabrease, 1888–1904
- Rev. Edward Wilson Averill, 1904–1923
- Rev. Louis Niccola Rocca, 1923–1930
- Rev. Charles Noyes Tyndell, 1931–1932
- Rev. James McNeal Wheatley, 1932–1947
- Rev. George Bartlett Wood, 1947–1971
- Rev. Chandler Corydon Randall, 1971–1988
- Rev. Frank Hazlett Moss III, 1990–1999
- Rev. Rebecca Ferrell Nickel, 2001–2004
- Rev. Thomas Parker Hansen, 2006–2016
- Rev. T. J. Freeman, 2017–2025

In 1955–1956, a large classroom building was added to the church to serve the needs of the growing parish. The church was added to the National Register of Historic Places in 1978.
