= Fort Wayne Park and Boulevard System Historic District =

Historic district in Indiana, US

- U.S. National Register of Historic Places
- U.S. Historic district
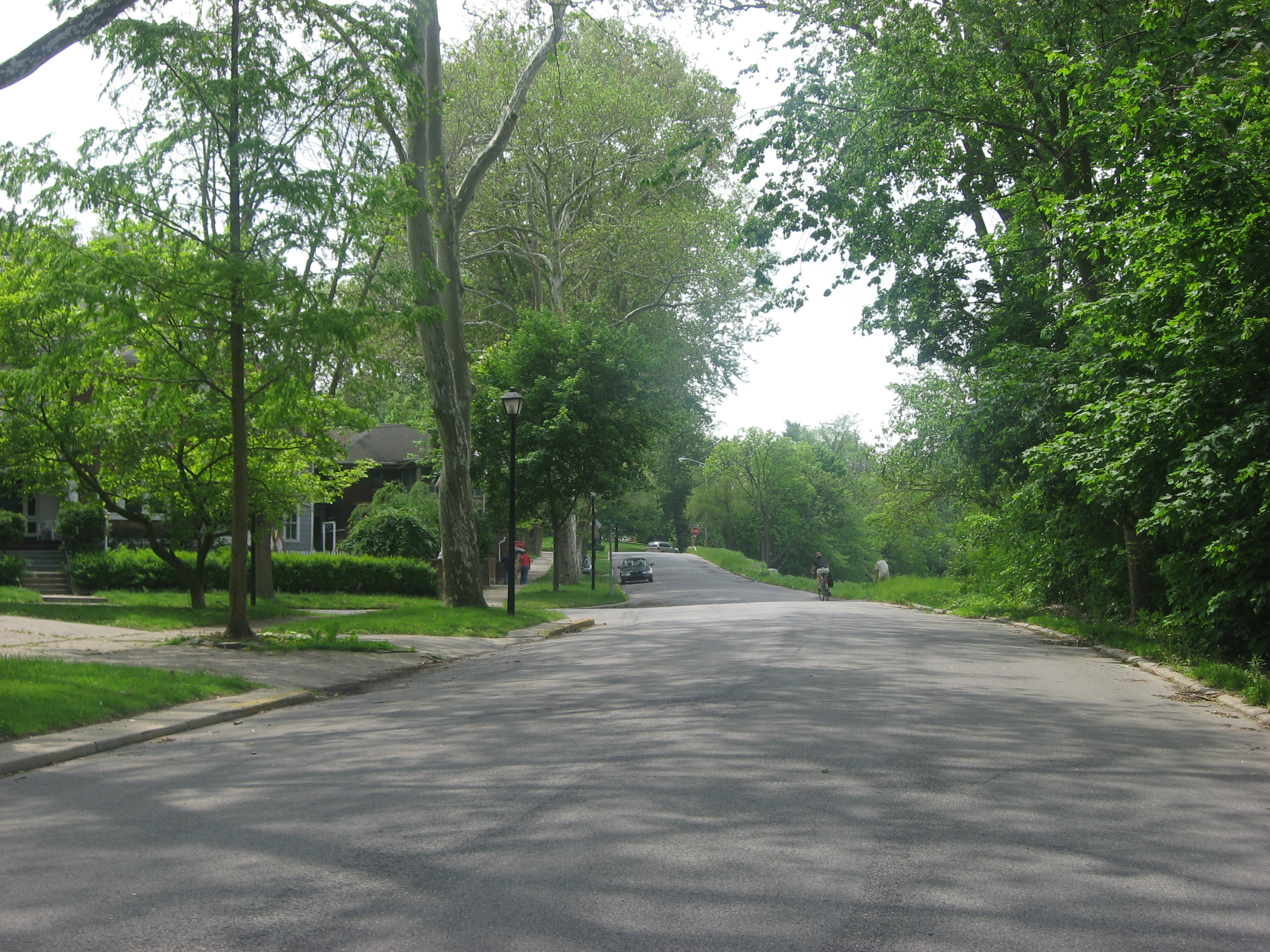
- Fort Wayne Park and Boulevard System Historic District, May 2012

- Location within Indiana Location within the United States
- Location: Roughly including the following parks and adjacent rights-of-way: Franke, McCormick, McCulloch, McMillen, Memorial, Nuckols, Old Fort, Reservoir, Rockhill, Weisser, and Williams, Fort Wayne, Indiana
- Coordinates: 41°03′51″N 85°05′26″W
- Area: 1,883 acres (762 ha)
- Built: c. 1909-1912
- Architect: Robinson, Charles Mulford; Kessler, George; Shurcliff, Arthur; et al.
- Architectural style: Tudor Revival, Colonial Revival, Bungalow / craftsman, Minimal Traditional, Ranch, et al.
- MPS: Park and Boulevard System of Fort Wayne, Indiana MPS
- NRHP reference No.: 10001099
- Added to NRHP: December 28, 2010

Fort Wayne Park and Boulevard System Historic District is a national historic district located at Fort Wayne, Indiana. The district encompasses 34 contributing buildings, 61 contributing sites, 70 contributing structures, and 15 contributing objects in 11 public parks, four parkways, and ten boulevards associated with the parkway and boulevard system in Fort Wayne. The system was originally conceived in 1909 by Charles Mulford Robinson (1869–1917) and further developed and refined by noted landscape architect and planner George Kessler (1862–1923) in 1911–1912. The buildings reflect Classical Revival and Bungalow / American Craftsman style architecture. Later additions and modifications include those by noted landscape architect Arthur Asahel Shurcliff.

It was listed on the National Register of Historic Places in 2010.
