= Ninde-Mead-Farnsworth House =

Historic house in Indiana, United States

- U.S. National Register of Historic Places
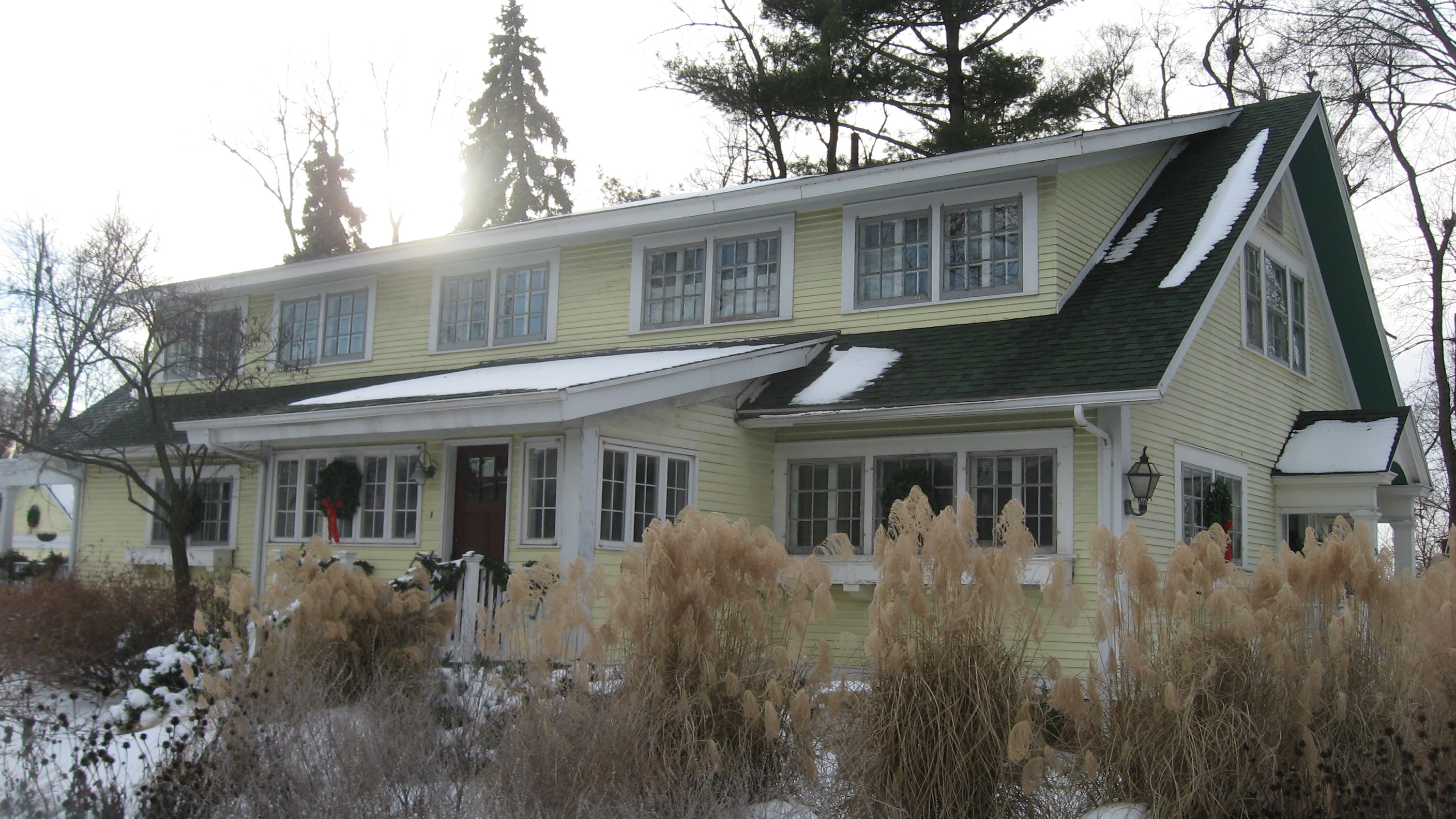
- Ninde-Mead-Farnsworth, January 2014

- Location within Indiana Location within the United States
- Location: 734 E. State Boulevard, Fort Wayne, Indiana
- Coordinates: 41°05′47″N 85°07′49″W
- Area: Less than 1.0 acre (0.40 ha)
- Built: c. 1910
- Architectural style: Colonial Revival, Bungalow/craftsman
- NRHP reference No.: 13000082
- Added to NRHP: March 20, 2013

Ninde-Mead-Farnsworth House, also known as Iriscrest and the Philo T. Farnsworth House, is a historic home located at Fort Wayne, Indiana. It was built about 1910, and is a 1 1/2-story, side gabled, Colonial Revival style frame dwelling. It features a pedimented entrance portico. It has American Craftsman style design elements including shed roofed dormers and overhanging eaves. Television pioneer Philo Farnsworth (1906–1971) lived here from 1948 to 1967.

It was listed on the National Register of Historic Places in 2013.
