= Christian G. Strunz House =

Historic house in Indiana, United States

- U.S. National Register of Historic Places
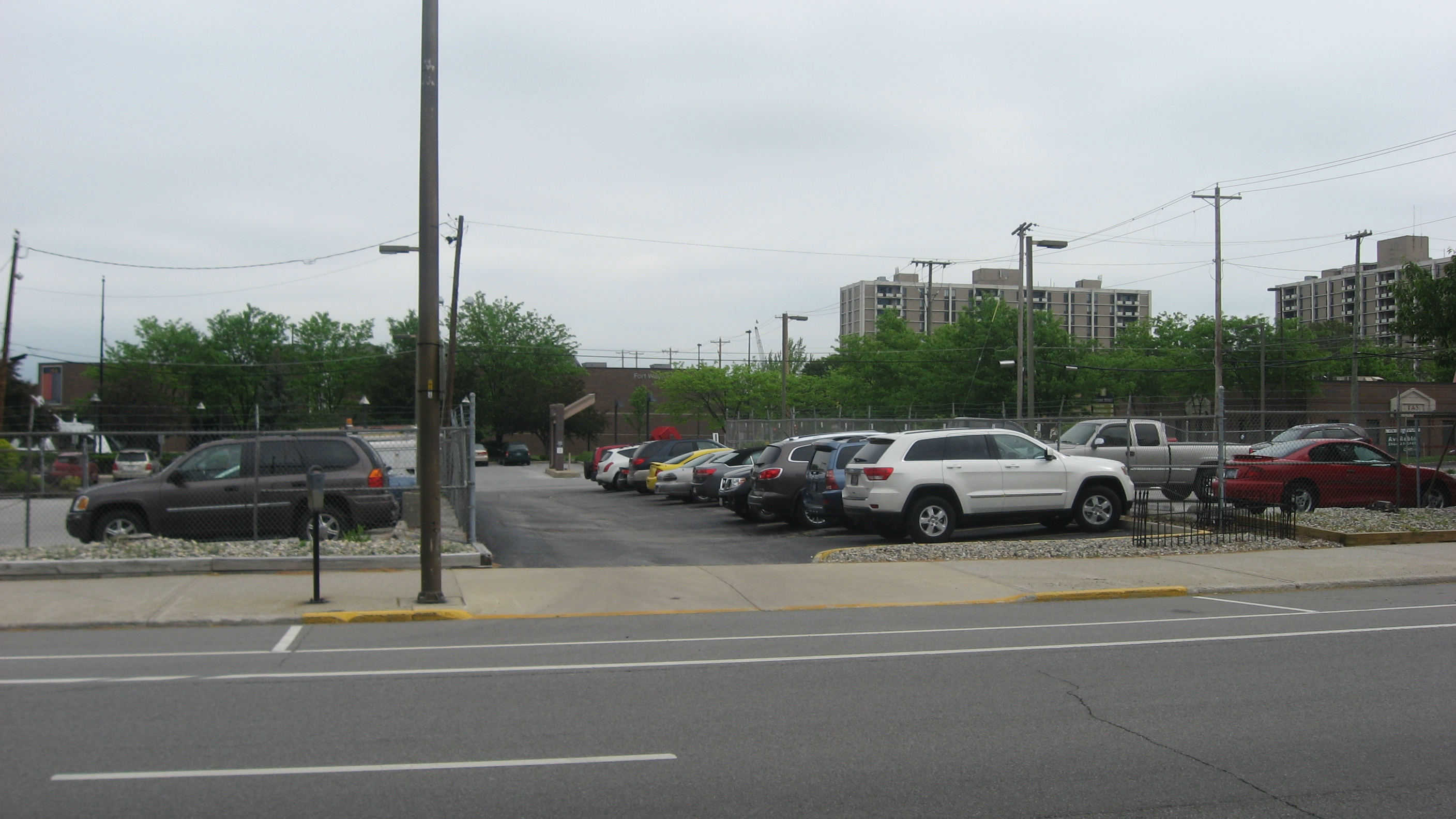
- Christian G. Strunz House site, May 2012

- Location within Indiana Location within the United States
- Location: 333 E. Berry St., Fort Wayne, Indiana
- Coordinates: 41°4′49″N 85°8′7″W
- Area: less than one acre
- Built: 1886-1887
- Architectural style: Italianate
- NRHP reference No.: 79000030
- Added to NRHP: October 4, 1979

Christian G. Strunz House, also known as the Sponhauer House, is a historic home located in Fort Wayne, Indiana. It was built in 1886–1887, and is a two-story, irregularly massed, Italianate style brick dwelling. It has a steeply pitched roof with flat deck. The house was moved to 1017 W. Berry St. in 1980 to prevent its demolition.

It was listed on the National Register of Historic Places in 1979.
