= South Wayne Historic District (Fort Wayne, Indiana) =

Historic district in Indiana, United States

- U.S. National Register of Historic Places
- U.S. Historic district
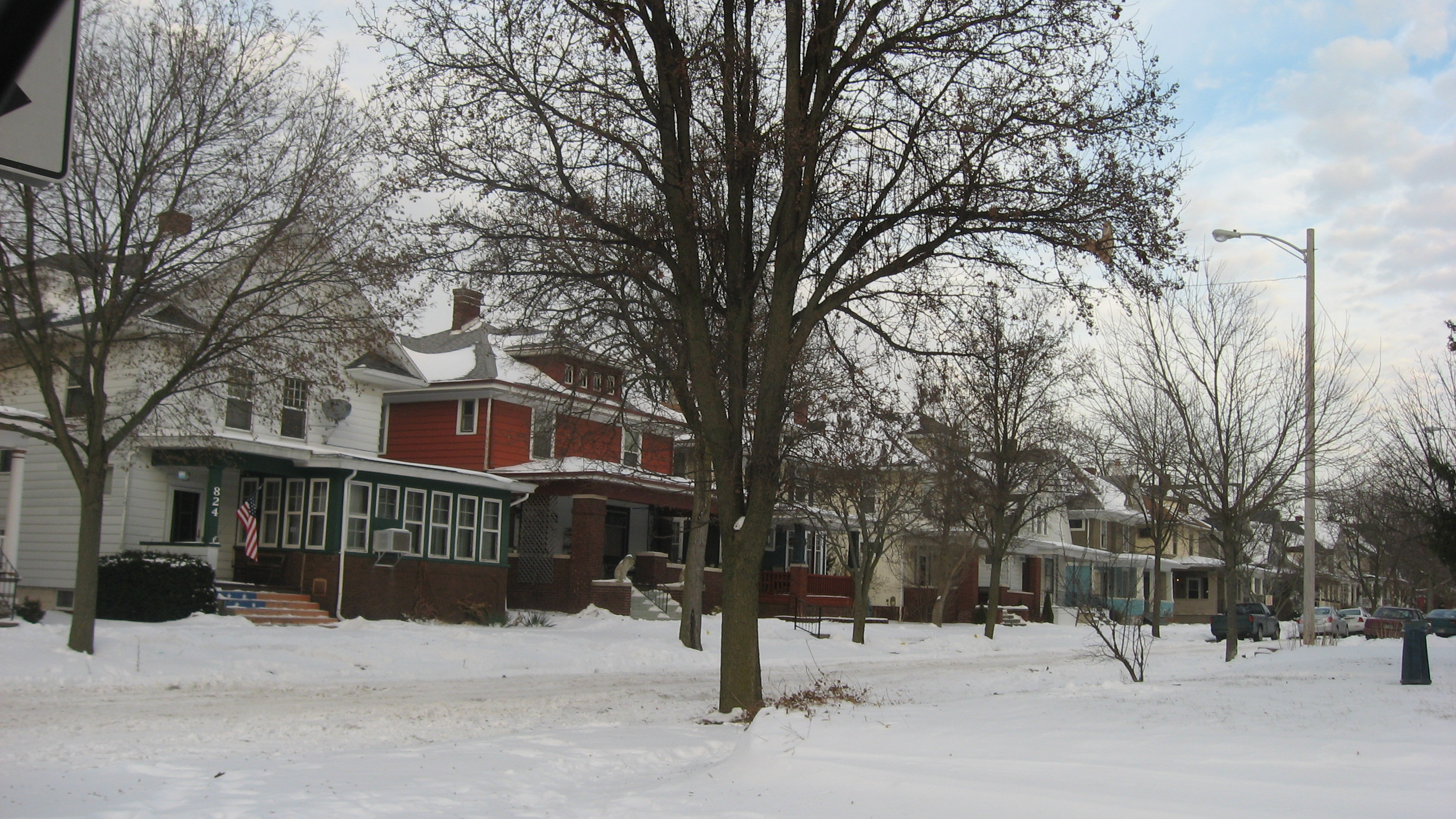
- 800 block of W. Kinnaird Avenue, South Wayne Historic District, January 2014

- Location within Indiana Location within the United States
- Location: Roughly bounded by W. Wildwood Ave., S. Wayne Ave., Packard Ave. and Beaver Ave., Fort Wayne, Indiana
- Coordinates: 41°03′22″N 85°08′59″W
- Area: 17 acres (6.9 ha)
- Architect: Ninde, Joel Roberts; Strauss, A.M.
- Architectural style: Colonial Revival, Bungalow/craftsman, American Four Square
- NRHP reference No.: 92001146
- Added to NRHP: September 4, 1992

South Wayne Historic District is a national historic district located at Fort Wayne, Indiana. The district encompasses 133 contributing buildings and 1 contributing structure in a predominantly residential section of Fort Wayne. The area was developed between about 1893 and 1940, and includes notable examples of Colonial Revival, American Four Square, and Bungalow / American Craftsman style residential architecture.

It was listed on the National Register of Historic Places in 1992.
