= Hagerman =

Hagerman may refer to:

== Places ==
- Hagerman, Idaho
- Hagerman, New Mexico
- Hagerman, New York
- Hagerman National Wildlife Refuge
- William C. and Clara Hagerman House in Fort Wayne, Indiana

== Other uses ==
- Hagerman (surname)
- Hagerman (LIRR station)
- Hagerman Pass, mountain pass of Colorado, United States

== See also ==
- Hagerman horse, prehistoric horse
