= List of neighborhoods in Fort Wayne, Indiana =

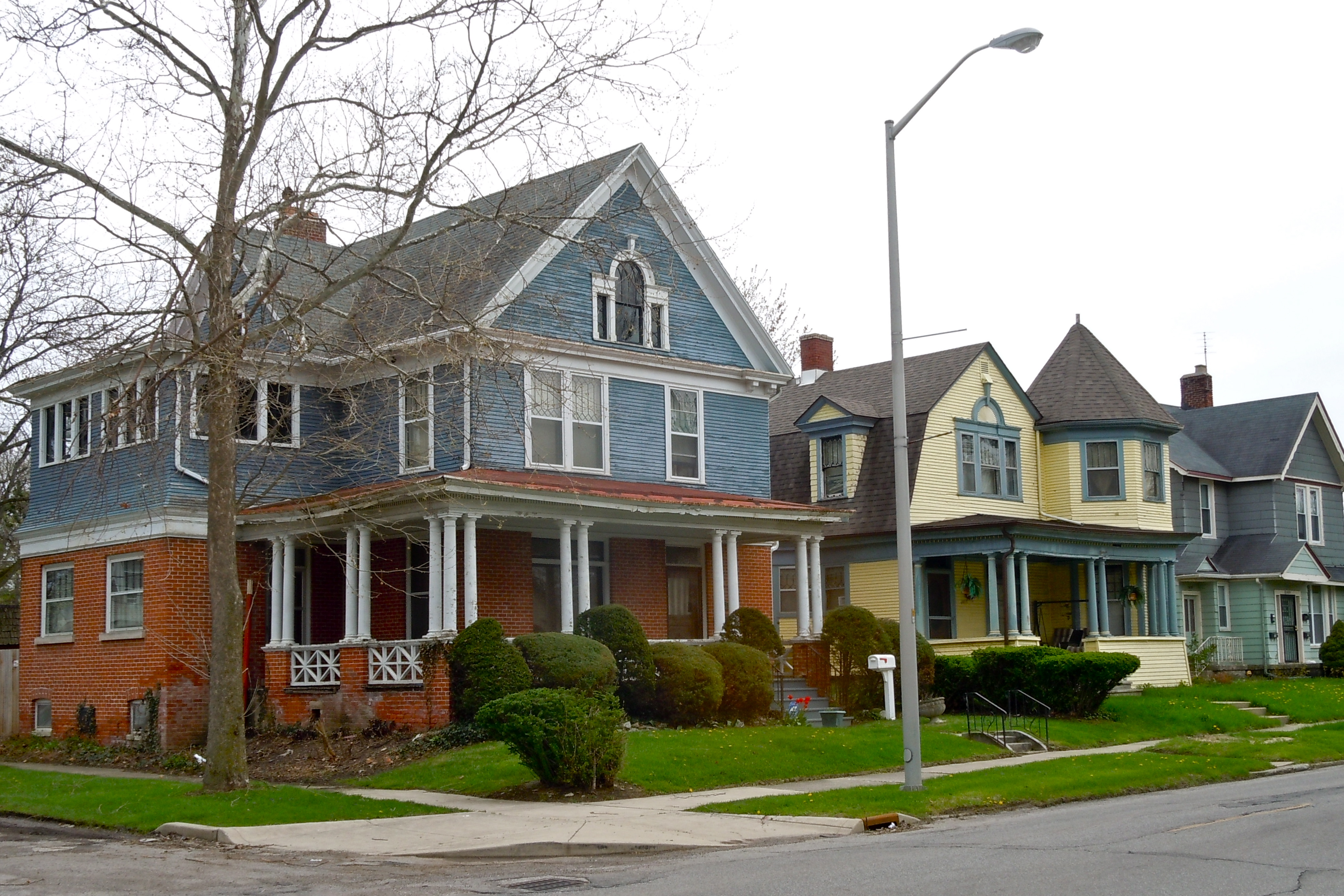
Homes in the Williams–Woodland Park Historic District

This is a list of neighborhoods in Fort Wayne, Indiana. Historically, Fort Wayne's neighborhoods have been divided among four unofficial quadrants: northeast, northwest, southeast, and southwest. Calhoun Street serves as the dividing line between the southwest and southeast, while the Saint Joseph River divides the northwest and northeast quadrants. The Maumee River separates the northeast and southeast, while portions of the Saint Marys River and Chicago, Fort Wayne and Eastern Railroad separate the northwest and southwest quadrants.

== Northeast ==
- Arlington Heights
- Arlington Park
- Audubon Park
- Auers
- Beacon Heights
- Bellair
- Bellshire
- Blackhawk
- Blackhawk Farm
- Blackhawk Forest
- Blum
- Bohde Grove
- Brandonwood
- Brentwood Park
- Briargate
- Bridlewood
- Brookside Estates
- Brookside Park
- Bullerman Park Forest
- Cambridge Oaks
- Camelot
- Caribe Colony
- Casa Grande Place

creeckside

- Centerhurst
- Chadwick
- Chandler's Landing
- Cherry Hill
- Concord Hill
- Concord Place
- Countrybrook
- Countryside Estate
- Creekwood
- Curdes Homewood Acres
- East Gate
- East State Park
- El Dorado Hills
- Fieldstone Place
- Forest Creek at Chandler
- Forest Park Boulevard
- Frances Slocum
- Georgetown
- Glenwood Park
- Golden Acres
- Greendale
- Greenfield
- Greentree
- Greenview
- Hacienda Village
- Hazelwood
- Hillsboro
- Hunter's Glen
- Hunter's Point
- Imperial Gardens
- Jonathon Oaks
- Kensington Downs
- Kern Valley Meadow
- Kingston Park
- Kirkwood Park
- The Knolls
- Lake Forest
- Lakes of Buckingham
- Lexington Heights
- Lockville
- Lofton Woods
- Maplewood Park
- Maplewood Terrace
- Maysville Heights
- Mill Ridge
- Mill Ridge Place
- Monarch Park
- Mystic Woods
- Newfield
- North Anthony
- Northside
- Oakhurt Park
- Old Timber Pass
- Old Brook Farm
- Parkerdale
- Parkview Addition
- Pine View Farms
- Ranchwood
- River Bend Woods
- Rothman Point
- Royal Oaks
- Sandy Point Estates
- Sawmill Woods
- Shannonside
- Shoaff Park Rivers Estates
- Somerset Acres
- Springfield Glen
- Statewood Park
- Still Water Place
- Summit Ridge
- Sunnybrook Acres
- Sunny Meadows
- Sunset
- Tamarak
- Tanbark Trails
- Timber Ridge
- Twin eagles

Tartans Glen

- Valley Park Forest
- Village of Buckingham
- Walden
- Waterford
- Wedgewood Place
- Willshire Estates
- Windswept
- Woodland Lake
- Wyndermere
- Yardley Manor

== Northwest ==
- Auburn Farms
- Bass–Leesburg
- Beckett's Run
- Bloomington
- Brookview
- Burning Tree
- Canyons of North Pointe Woods
- Carroll Creek
- Carroll Estates
- Cedar Ridge
- Colonial Park
- Concordia Gardens
- Coves of Jacob's Creek
- Crestwood
- Eagle Lake
- Edgewood Park
- Estates of Sandy Pointe
- Fall Creek
- Fallen Timbers
- Falls of Keefer Creek
- Five Points
- Hampton Village North
- Hamilton
- Harris Meadows
- Hearthstone
- Hickory Glen
- Hickory Hill
- Highland Park Forest
- Hunter's Knoll
- Irvington Park
- Jacob's Creek
- La Cabreah
- Laurel Ridge
- Lima Meadow
- Lima Valley
- Limberlost Acres
- Lincoln Park
- Lincoln Village
- Log Cabin Park
- Longwood
- Ludwig Circle
- Ludwig Park
- Manor Park
- Mardego Hills
- Millstone
- Nebraska
- Newberry
- Northbrook
- Northcrest
- North Franke Park
- North Highlands
- North Pointe Ridge
- North Pointe Woods
- North Sherwood Terrace/Silver Maples
- North Triangle
- Northwest Lima Woods
- Northwest Passage
- Northwood Park
- Oak Glen
- Oakmont
- Papermill Bluffs
- Pine Valley
- Rapids of Keefer Creek
- Riverview
- Royville
- Seven Oaks
- Springwood/Orchard Woods
- Spy Run
- Steeplechase
- Stonecreek
- Stonefield
- Summerfield
- Sutter's Cove
- Timberon
- Tower Heights
- Valley Place
- Wallen
- Wallen Chase
- Wallen Hills
- Waterswolde
- Westwood North
- Westwood Valley
- Wheat Ridge
- Wild Meadows
- Windmill Ridge
- Windrift
- Windsor Woods
- Woodland Lake
- Woodlands of Riverside
- Woodmont Ridge

== Southeast ==
- Anthony Wayne
- Branning Hills
- Casselwood Terrace
- Colonial Heritage
- Congress–McKinnie
- Continental Park
- Crown Colony
- East Central
- Eastland Gardens
- Eastside
- Greater McMillen Park
- Harvester
- Hickory Grove
- Hillcrest
- Hoevelwood
- Lafayette Place
- La Rez
- Maumee Terrace
- McKinnie–Senate
- Memorial Park
- Morningside Terrace
- Mount Vernon Park
- Oakland Park
- Oxford
- Pettit–Rudisill
- Pontiac Place
- Renaissance Pointe
- Rolling Rose
- Rudisill–Plaza
- South Calhoun Place
- South Suburban
- Southtown Meadow
- Southwick
- Suburban Heights
- Trier Ridge Park
- Victoria Park
- Village Woods
- Westchester
- Williams Park

== Southwest ==
- Abbey Place
- Aboite
- Aboite Lake Estates
- Aboite Meadows
- Amber Ridge Estates
- Ansley Acres
- Aspen Village
- Barrington Lake Estates
- Barrington Woods
- Bittersweet Estates
- Bittersweet Lakes
- Bittersweet Moors
- Blue Creek
- Bluewater Estates
- Breconshire
- Brierwood Hills
- Broad River
- Burnham Woods
- Candlelight Park
- Centaur Acres
- Copper Hill
- Country Club Gardens
- Coves of Westlakes
- Covington Bluffs
- Covington Chase
- Covington Dells
- Covington Hollow
- Covington Homesteads
- Covington Knolls
- Covington Lake Estates
- Covington Pines
- Covington Place
- Covington Pointe
- Covington Reserve
- Creighton–Home
- Deerfield Estates
- Dells of Bittersweet
- Eagle Creek
- Ellisville
- Emerald Lakes
- Fairfield
- Fairfield Terrace–Belmont
- Fairmont
- Forest Ridge
- Foster Park
- Glens of Bittersweet
- Harrison Hill
- Haverhill of Coventry
- Hazelhurst
- Heather Ridge
- Hillside Acres
- Highland Gardens
- Hoagland–Masterson
- Homestead Hills
- The Homesteads
- Illsley Place
- Indian Village
- Interurban Acres
- Inverness Hills
- Inverness Lakes
- Kekionga Shores
- Lake of the Woods
- Lakes of Liberty Mills
- Lake Shores
- Langford Oaks
- Liberty Hills
- Lincolnshire
- Manor Woods
- Oak Borough
- Oakdale
- Oakland Park
- Packard
- The Parke'
- Parkway Hills
- Pine Hills
- Pine Hollow
- Plantation of Aboite
- Poplar
- Poplar Ridge
- Ridgewood
- Rolling Hills
- Rock Creek
- Saratoga Park
- Sheffield Woods
- Sherwood to Pettit
- Shores of Coventry
- Shores of Oak Borough
- Shores of Rock Creek
- Shorewood
- South Wayne
- Southwood Park
- Sycamore Hills
- Waynedale^{[A]}
- West Central
- West Rudisill
- Westchester Glens
- Westchester Lakes
- Westchester Ridge
- Westfield
- Westlakes
- Westlawn
- Westmoor Park
- Westwood/Fairway
- Whispering Meadows
- Whispering Woods
- Wildwood Park
- Williams–Woodland Park
- Wilmarbee
- Woodhurst
- Woodland Hills

== Notes ==
A. Waynedale encompasses the smaller neighborhoods of Ardmore Knolls, Avalon Place, Belle Vista, Broadview Terrace, Elmcrest, Elmhurst, Ferndale, Indian Village, Lake Shores, Lakewood Park, Old Trail, Sand Point, Stone Lake, St. Marys–Winchester Road, Vesey, and Winterset.
