= Patchogue High School =

Location
- 121 Saxton St, East Patchogue, New York; 40.7846°N 73.0033°W

Information
- Other name: Saxton Middle School
- School type: public
- Established: 1910
- Status: Closed
- Closed: 1972
- Authority: Patchogue-Medford Public Schools
- Oversight: Suffolk BOCES
- Authorizer: Long Island Schools
- Grades: 9–12
- Years offered: 4
- Hours in school day: 7
- Area: 128,848 sq. yards
- Colors: Red, Black
- Nickname: PHS
- Communities served: East Patchogue, North Patchogue, North Bellport, Holtsville

Patchogue High School was a public high school in East Patchogue, New York. It changed in 1972 when the Patchogue-Medford School District re-organized grade levels.

== History ==
Patchogue High School was incorporated in 1910, closed as a high school in 1972 and reopened as Saxton Avenue Middle School. It was one of two high schools serving the district, along with Patchogue-Medford High School. The school served students from grades 9–12.

During the 1970s, Patchogue-Medford U.F.S.D reorganized grade levels, and closed two schools in effect of the reorganization. They cut PHS and Oregon Avenue Junior High School, leaving the school district with Saxton Middle School and Oregon Middle School.
