= Kensington Boulevard Historic District =

Historic district in Indiana, United States

- U.S. National Register of Historic Places
- U.S. Historic district
- The main entrance to the northern portion of the district

- Location within Indiana Location within the United States
- Location: Kensington Boulevard between Niagara and State Boulevard., Fort Wayne, Indiana
- Coordinates: 41°05′45″N 85°06′51″W
- Area: 44.4 acres (18.0 ha)
- Built: c. 1917-1930
- Architectural style: Tudor Revival, Colonial Revival, Bungalow / craftsman et al.
- MPS: Historic Residential Suburbs in the United States, 1830-1960 MPS
- NRHP reference No.: 100004368
- Added to NRHP: September 3, 2019

The Kensington Boulevard Historic District is a historic district on the National Register of Historic Places in Fort Wayne, Indiana, added in 2019. The district contains more than 170 homes built between 1917 and 1955, with one home dating to approximately 1870. The boundaries of the district stretch from Niagara Drive along Maumee River in the south to East State Boulevard, its present northern boundary. To the west, it is bounded by the North Anthony Boulevard Historic District, and to the east, by Pemberton Drive. The entire length of this portion of Kengsington features esplanades planted with trees. The district was platted in two separate phases, the north phase in 1917 and the south phase in 1921, on a grid plan.

A view north along the esplanade on Kensington

Kensington Boulevard extends a further five blocks north from East State, where it merges into Lawndale Drive; these block are not encompassed by the historic district at present. This portion of the boulevard was developed separately from the portions south of State Street, and lacks the distinctive esplanades found further south.

The original development at the heart of the district was called Kensington Park, and included homes along nearby North Anthony Boulevard that are now part of the separate North Anthony Boulevard Historic District. Kensington Park's developer, W.E. Doud, consciously emulated the nearby Forest Park development that includes the present day Forest Park Boulevard Historic District. Kensington Park and other nearby developments proceeded following a City Beautiful plan for the city of Fort Wayne by city planner and architect George Kessler that became the basis for the Fort Wayne Park and Boulevard System Historic District. The plan specified uniform setbacks and placement of allées along the portion of the development bordering on North Anthony Boulevard.

An American Craftsman house in the district

The district contains examples of a number of home styles popular during the period, including Tudor Revival, Colonial Revival, American Craftsman, and American Foursquare, Prairie, and Neoclassical. Later in-fill development added examples of the ranch and American Small House styles. An Italianate farmhouse from the 19th century was present when the development was platted, and the developer built around it; it is distinguished by facing away from Kensington Boulevard, even though it is not on a corner, where the homes often face a cross street. Lots in the northern, 1917 phase of the development are on larger lots and homes tend to be grander styles such as Tudor Revival. In the southern, 1921 phase, the lots are smaller and the homes tend to be in less elaborate styles, such as American Craftsman, American Foursquare, and Colonial Revival. Most of the later in-fill development occurred in this phase.

A Colonial Revival house in the district

The district features three stylized entrances that were part of the original Kensington Park plan. At East State street, the entrance to Kensington boulevard is flanked by square brick columns with stone tops connected to brick walls that rise to the midpoint of the columns. The columns are corbelled at the midpoint, from whence they are battered upwards. The stone walls are capped with brick corbels to present a contrast to the stone-capped brick columns. A further column is placed on the opposite side of each sidewalk to make a matching pair. Entrance structures matching this set are placed at the south end of the first phase, on the north side of the intersection of Kensington and Lake Avenue, with the addition of globe light fixtures. On the south side of this intersection, a similar structure forms the entrance to the south phase, except it is made entirely of stone the top. Like its counterpart across Lake Avenue, it also features globe lighting.

Stone entrance structure for the southern portion

The Kensington Boulevard Historic District, along with the neighboring North Anthony Boulevard Historic District, is within the boundaries of the North Anthony Area Association, a voluntary neighborhood association which was formed in the 1970s to lobby against widening North Anthony Boulevard to four lanes of traffic.
