= East Patchogue, New York =

- Hamlet and Census-designated place
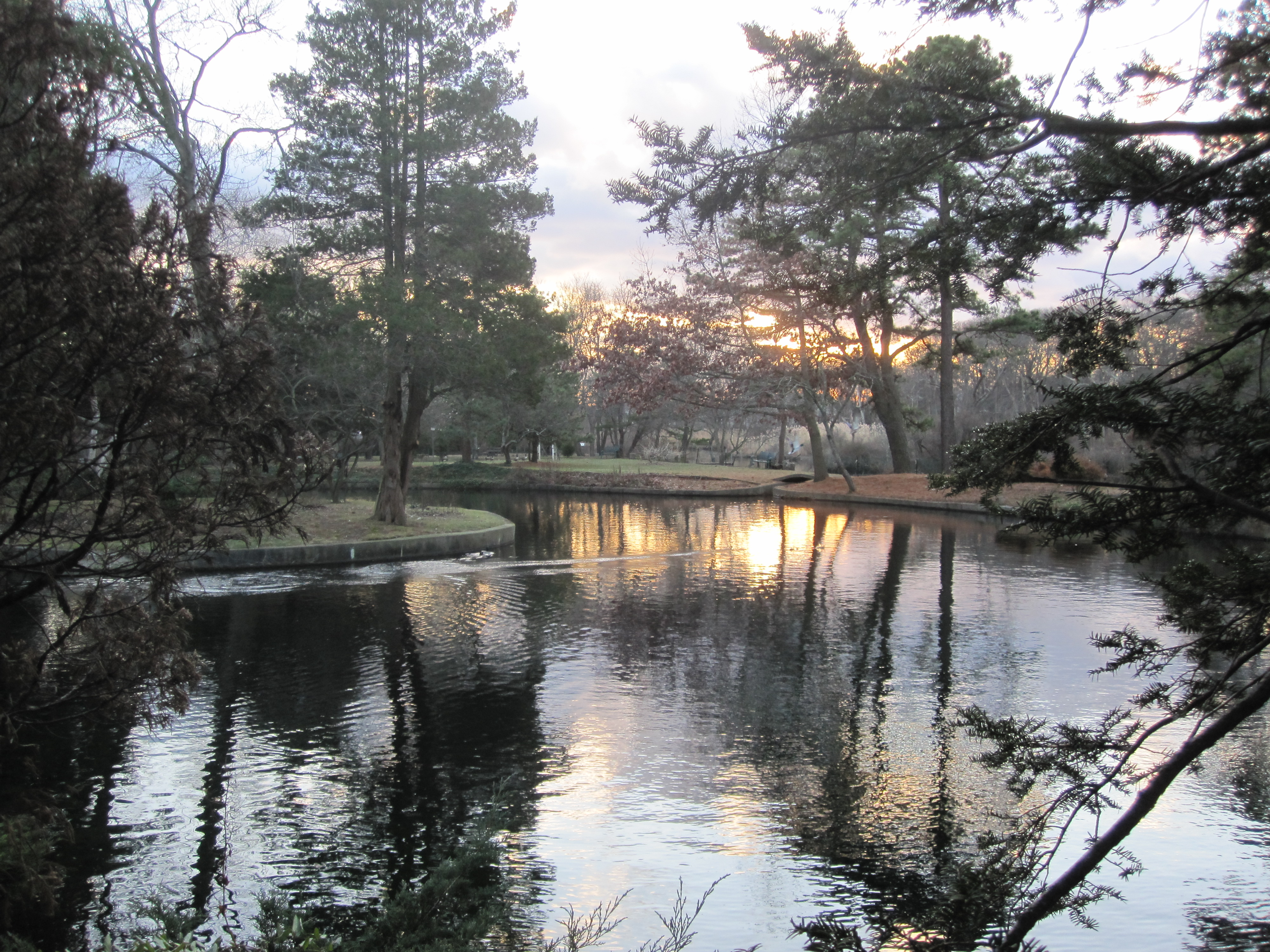
- A park in East Patchogue

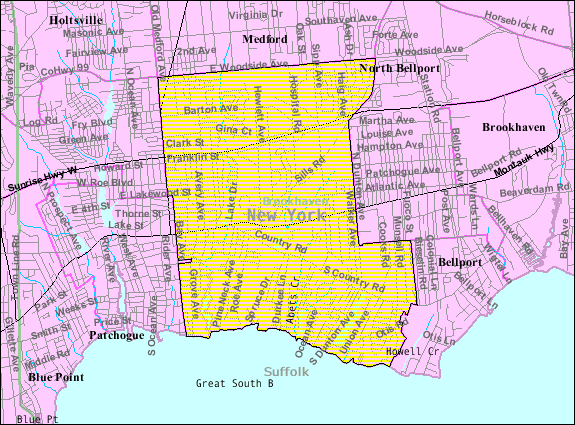
- U.S. Census map of East Patchogue.

- Location on Long Island Location within the state of New York
- Coordinates: 40°46′6″N 72°58′59″W
- Country: United States
- State: New York
- County: Suffolk
- Town: Brookhaven
- Named after: Its location immediately east of Patchogue

Area
  - Total: 8.46 sq mi (21.92 km^{2})
  - Land: 8.32 sq mi (21.54 km^{2})
  - Water: 0.14 sq mi (0.37 km^{2})
- Elevation: 23 ft (7 m)

Population (2020)
  - Total: 21,580
  - Density: 2,594.3/sq mi (1,001.66/km^{2})
- Time zone: UTC−05:00 (Eastern Time Zone)
  - Summer (DST): UTC−04:00
- ZIP Code: 11772
- Area codes: 631, 934
- FIPS code: 36-22733
- GNIS feature ID: 0949199

East Patchogue (/ˈpætʃɒɡ/, PATCH-awg) is a hamlet and census-designated place (CDP) in the Town of Brookhaven in Suffolk County, on the South Shore of Long Island, in New York, United States. The population was 21,580 at the time of the 2020 census.

The CDP is a proximate representation of the East Patchogue hamlet used for statistical purposes of the United States Census Bureau.

== History ==
Patchogue has historically been a major shopping and commerce hub of Suffolk County. "Patchogue" in the narrow sense is an incorporated village with narrow limits, only about a mile and a half wide. East Patchogue includes the eastern portion of Patchogue in the wider sense, as well as the area east of that but still west of the incorporated village of Bellport. This double meaning of "East Patchogue" is reflected in the naming of New York State Route 27A: It is called "East Main Street" in the western portion of East Patchogue, and "Montauk Highway" (as it typically is outside of villages) in the eastern portion. The western side of East Patchogue is in the Patchogue-Medford School District, while the eastern side is in the South Country Central School District, and its high-school students attend Bellport High School.

The area around County Road 80 in the western portion of East Patchogue was once commonly regarded as the hamlet of Hagerman. In New York, a hamlet has no official boundaries or government and refers only to a named, settled area. With suburban growth, Hagerman is no longer distinct from its surroundings, and the name has fallen into disuse, especially since the removal of the Hagerman station on the Long Island Rail Road. There still exists the Hagerman fire district.

Prior to its closure, the East Patchogue post office was located at 1415 Montauk Highway.

== Geography ==
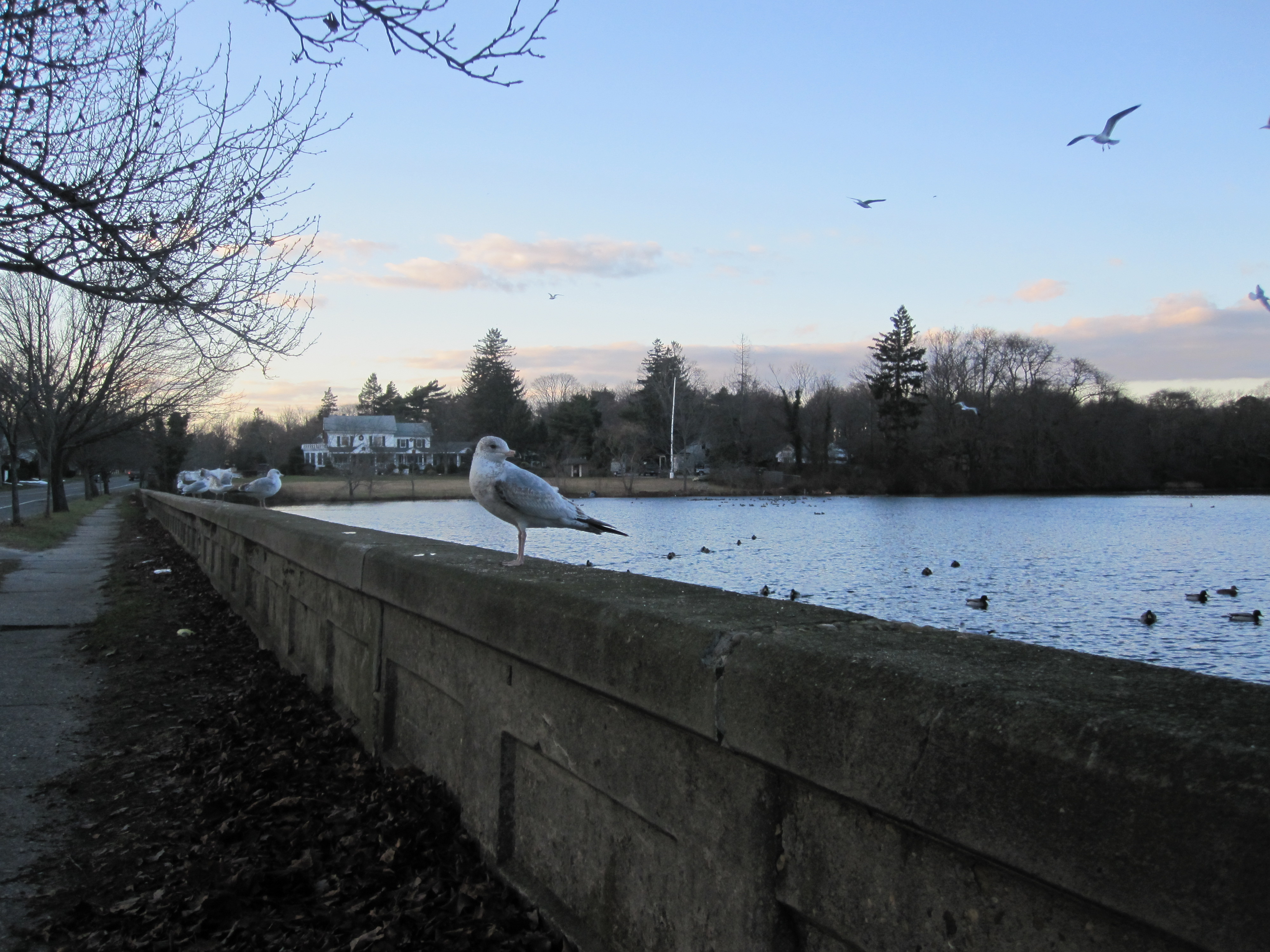
Robinson Pond along Suffolk CR 36.

According to the United States Census Bureau, the CDP has a total area of 8.5 square miles (22 km^{2}), of which 8.3 square miles (21 km^{2}) is land and 0.2 square miles (0.52 km^{2}) – or 1.89% – is water.

== Demographics ==
Historical population
Census	Pop.	Note	%±
2000	20,824		—
2010	22,469		7.9%
2020	21,580		−4.0%
U.S. Decennial Census

=== 2020 census ===
As of the 2020 census, East Patchogue had a population of 21,580. The median age was 43.3 years. 18.6% of residents were under the age of 18 and 19.6% of residents were 65 years of age or older. For every 100 females there were 96.2 males, and for every 100 females age 18 and over there were 93.1 males age 18 and over.

100.0% of residents lived in urban areas, while 0.0% lived in rural areas.

There were 8,221 households in East Patchogue, of which 26.5% had children under the age of 18 living in them. Of all households, 46.5% were married-couple households, 17.2% were households with a male householder and no spouse or partner present, and 28.5% were households with a female householder and no spouse or partner present. About 28.7% of all households were made up of individuals and 15.4% had someone living alone who was 65 years of age or older.

There were 8,612 housing units, of which 4.5% were vacant. The homeowner vacancy rate was 1.0% and the rental vacancy rate was 4.2%.

Racial composition as of the 2020 census
Race	Number	Percent
White	15,220	70.5%
Black or African American	1,058	4.9%
American Indian and Alaska Native	106	0.5%
Asian	526	2.4%
Native Hawaiian and Other Pacific Islander	8	0.0%
Some other race	2,451	11.4%
Two or more races	2,211	10.2%
Hispanic or Latino (of any race)	4,975	23.1%

=== 2000 census ===
As of the census of 2000, there were 20,824 people, 7,493 households, and 5,297 families residing in the CDP. The population density was 2,503.9 inhabitants per square mile (966.8/km^{2}). There were 7,760 housing units at an average density of 933.1 per square mile (360.3/km^{2}). The racial makeup of the CDP was 89.48% White, 3.19% African American, 0.14% Native American, 1.94% Asian, 0.01% Pacific Islander, 3.25% from other races, and 1.98% from two or more races. Hispanic or Latino of any race were 9.10% of the population.

There were 7,493 households, out of which 31.4% had children under the age of 18 living with them, 56.6% were married couples living together, 9.6% had a female householder with no husband present, and 29.3% were non-families. 23.3% of all households were made up of individuals, and 11.9% had someone living alone who was 65 years of age or older. The average household size was 2.71 and the average family size was 3.21.

In the CDP, the population was spread out, with 23.1% under the age of 18, 7.7% from 18 to 24, 30.4% from 25 to 44, 23.9% from 45 to 64, and 14.9% who were 65 years of age or older. The median age was 38 years. For every 100 females, there were 94.8 males. For every 100 females age 18 and over, there were 90.9 males.

The median income for a household in the CDP was $57,237, and the median income for a family was $64,323. Males had a median income of $45,274 versus $31,704 for females. The per capita income for the CDP was $23,619. About 2.5% of families and 4.5% of the population were below the poverty threshold, including 4.0% of those under age 18 and 9.7% of those age 65 or over.

== Historic sites ==
The Smith-Rourke House and Swan River Schoolhouse are listed on the National Register of Historic Places. The Avery Homestead (also known as the Swan River Nursery), is listed as a threatened site sought for restoration by Preservation Long Island.

== Pine Neck boat ramp ==
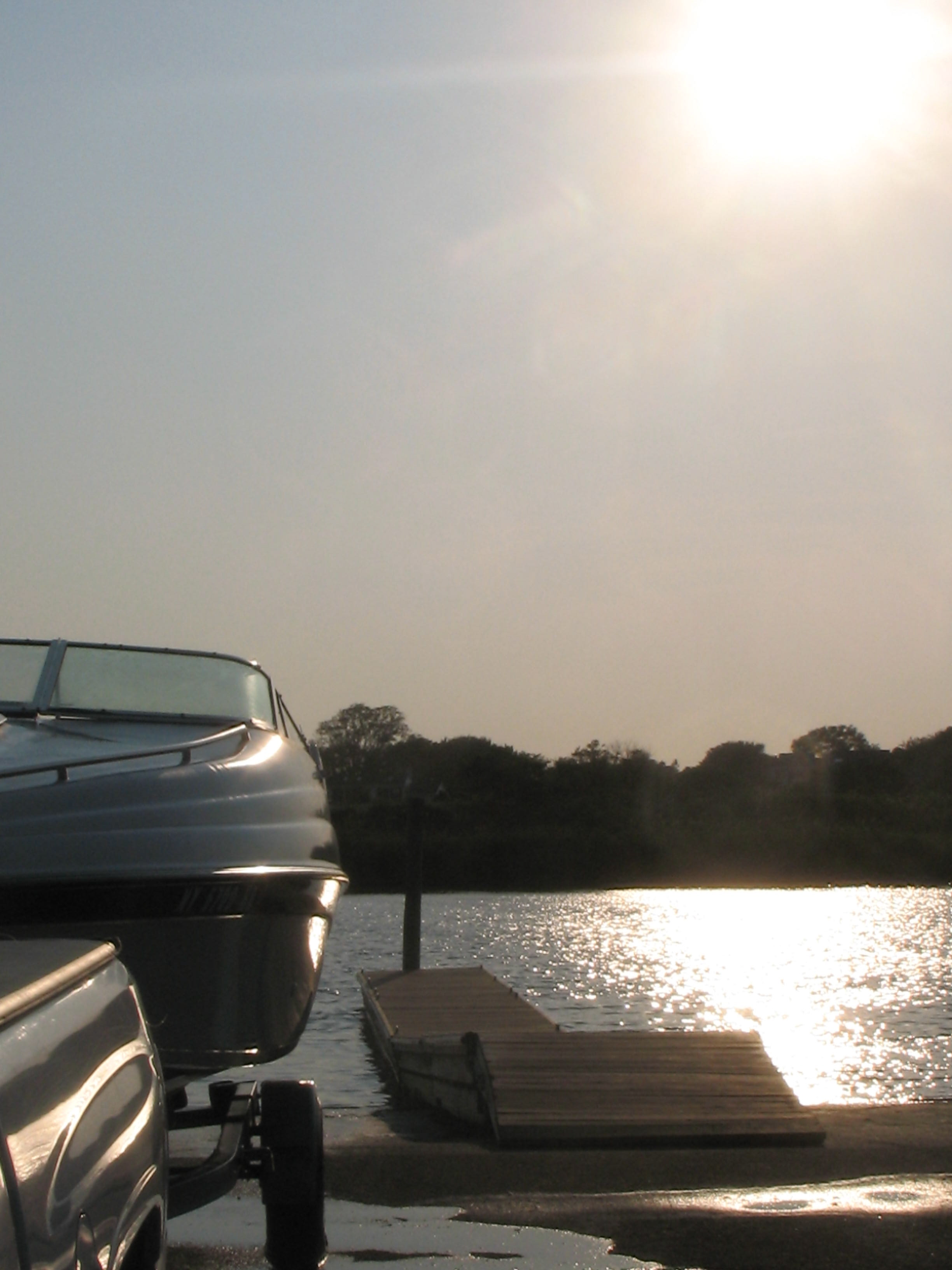
The Pine Neck Boat Ramp on the east bank of the Swan River. A fishing pier also exists here.

Pine Neck Avenue boat ramp and fishing pier are on the south shore of East Patchogue. Accessible by the Swan River at the south end of Pine Neck Avenue, this is a main boat access ramp off the Swan River inlet, connecting the Patchogue Bay and Great South Bay, in south central Long Island.

Pine Neck is approximately 400 yards (370 m) east of the Village of Patchogue, located on the southeastern corner of the Swan River inlet and Patchogue Bay. It is an undeveloped Park in the Township of Brookhaven, Suffolk County. Boaters travel from Blue Point, on the westernmost tip of Patchogue Bay, to Howell's Point, on the eastern side of the bay. Seasonal permits are required for residents to launch their boats. The park can accommodate around 50 cars and trucks.

Pine Neck Avenue Park is on the central shore of Patchogue Bay, and is due north of Watch Hill and Davis Park. The Fire Island National Seashore is one of the Barrier Islands and is a recreational destination for many south shore boaters.

The Park offers a natural beach, fishing pier, two boat ramps, and an adjacent undeveloped shoreline called "40 acres". Pine Neck gives residents and visitors alike access and scenic views into Long Island's Great South Bay.

== Education ==
Education in East Patchogue is served by the South Country Central School District and the Patchogue-Medford UFSD.

Patchogue High School (Saxton Middle School) is Located on Saxton St. in North-Western East Patchogue near the border of North Patchogue and Medford.

List of Schools in East Patchogue

- Barton Elementary School
- Brookhaven Annex School
- Patchogue High School (Non- Operating)
- Saxton Middle School
- Verne W. Critz Elementary School
- Victory Academy Elementary School

== Notable people ==
- Tom Baldwin, racing driver
- Daniel J. Bernstein, programmer, professor of mathematics and computer science.
- Giovanni Capitello, filmmaker/actor - was born in Brooklyn and raised in East Patchogue.
- Peter David, writer of comic books, novels, television, films, and video games.
- Charles S. Havens, businessman and politician
- Neal Heaton, baseball pitcher for numerous teams, including the New York Yankees (1993), lives in East Patchogue.
- Robert Reidt, prophet of doom

== See also ==
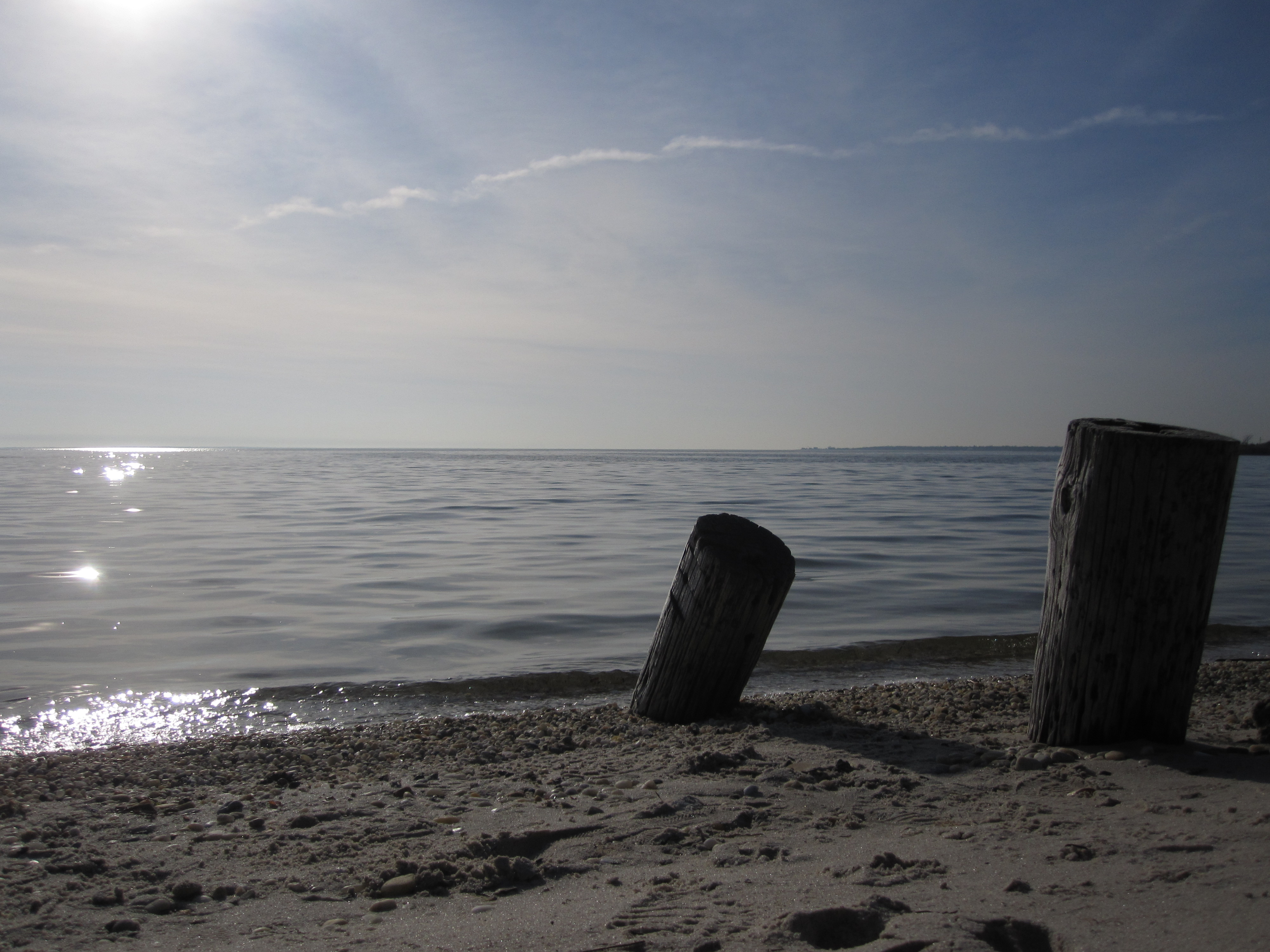
Patchogue Bay

- Patchogue, New York
- Patchogue Bay
- Swan River
- Swan Lake Park
- Hagerman, New York
