= Patchogue-Medford High School =

- Navy (SEAL) LT Michael P. Murphy Campus
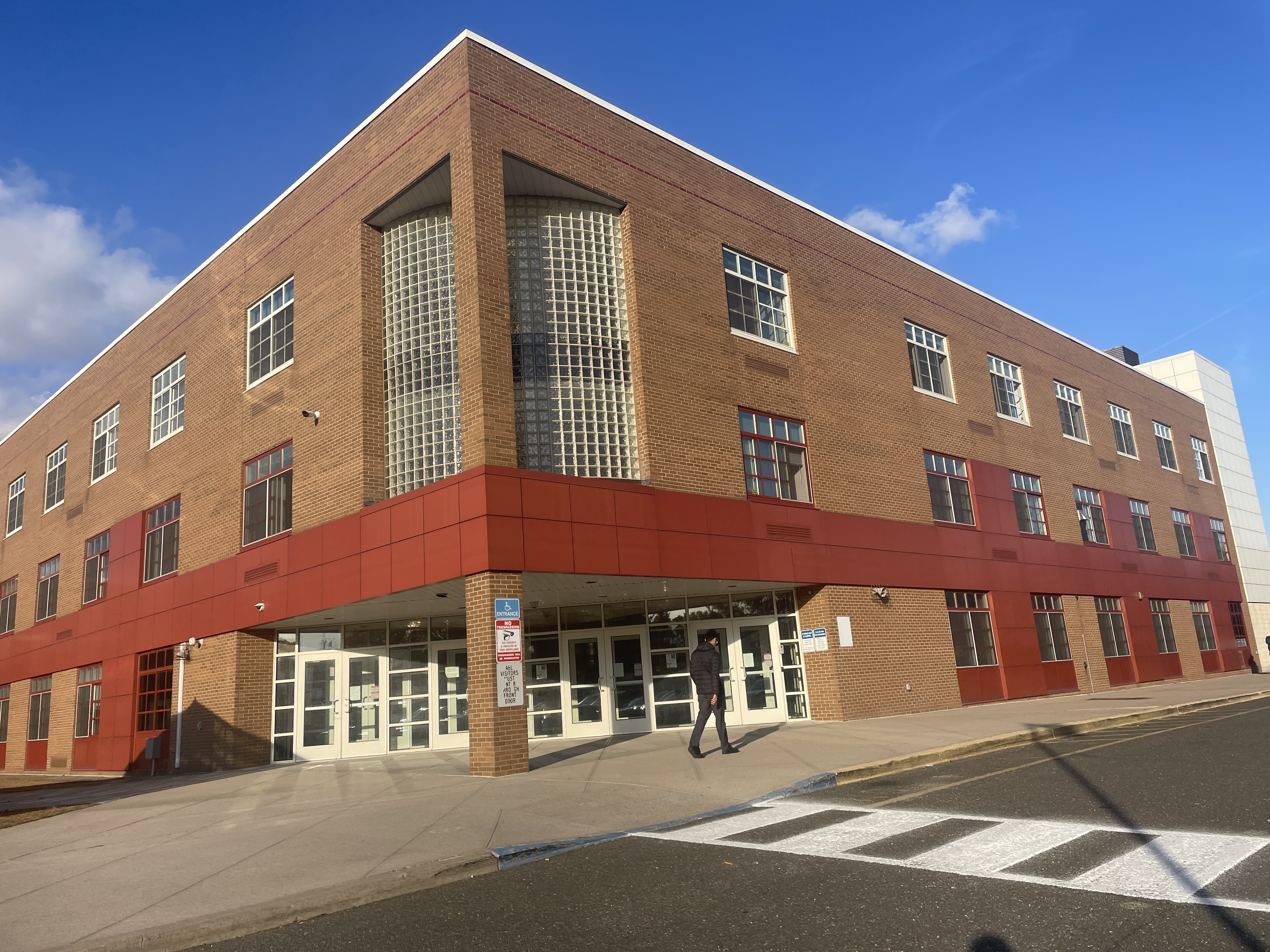
- The south entrance in 2024

Location
- 181 Buffalo Avenue; Medford, New York, (Suffolk County); United States; 40°48′32″N 72°59′18″W

Information
- School type: Public High school
- School district: Patchogue-Medford School District
- Superintendent: Patrick Harrigan Ed.D.
- School code: 009
- Principal: Randy Rusielewicz
- Assistant principals: 5
- Teaching staff: 190.08 (FTE)
- Grades: 9-12
- Gender: Coeducational
- Enrollment: 2,443 (2022–2023)
- Average class size: 28
- Student to teacher ratio: 12.85
- Classes offered: AP computer science A and AB; AP European History, AP Environmental Science; Statistics, Graphic Design, Literacy Support, Welding, AP Language and Composition, Cosmetology and Personal Specialized Paths and more
- Hours in school day: 7 hours
- Colors: Red and black
- Slogan: "Pride Matters"
- Nickname: PMHS
- Team name: Raiders
- Newspaper: "The Red & Black"
- Yearbook: "Record"
- AP Classes offered: 28
- Website: www.pmschools.org/our-schools/patchogue-medford-high-school

Patchogue-Medford High School (colloquially Pat-Med or Buffalo Avenue High School) is a public high school in Medford, Brookhaven, New York, which is located in Suffolk County on Long Island, in the United States. The school is part of Patchogue-Medford School District. The campus was renamed "Navy (SEAL) LT Michael P. Murphy Campus" after the US Navy SEAL, Michael P. Murphy.

== Academics ==
According to 2007 data, 90.0% of Patchogue-Medford graduates earn a New York State Regent's diploma. 48% percent of graduates plan to attend 4 year college, and 33.6% plan to attend a two-year college, such as nearby Suffolk County Community College.

== Specialized Classes ==
Nearby Suffolk BOCES provides many career-targeted classes. The district also provides Career and Technical Education (CTE) to students from 10th Grade and on, including but not limited to:

- Business: Beacon Accounting
- Clinical Medical Assisting
- Computer Technology/Networking
- Construction Trades
- Cosmetology
- Fashion Design and Merchandising
- Law Enforcement
- Principles of Engineering
- Teaching as a Profession

Additionally, the school also offers Driver Education (Drivers ED) to students with a junior driving license (Learner's Permit)

== Athletics ==
=== Sports offered ===
Athletics at Pat-Med Include the following.

- Badminton
- Baseball
- Basketball (Boys and Girls)
- Unified Basketball
- Bowling
- Unified Bowling
- Cheerleading
- Cross Country
- Field Hockey
- Flag Football
- Football
- Game Day Cheerleading
- Kick Line (Raiderettes)
- Fall Golf
- Spring Golf (Boys and Girls)
- Gymnastics
- Lacrosse (Boys and Girls)
- Soccer (Boys and Girls)
- Softball
- Swimming/Diving (Boys and Girls)
- Tennis (Boys and Girls)
- Track and Field (Indoor) Track and Field (Outdoor)
- Volleyball (Boys and Girls)
- Wrestling (Boys and Girls)

=== Football ===
Pat-Med football won back to back Division One Long Island Championships in 1996 and 1997, along with a Suffolk County Championship in 1988. They also had a 22 game winning streak from the end of 1996 to the beginning of 1998. The streak tied the Suffolk County record for longest win streak set by Central Islip decades before.

== Facilities ==
In 2003, Patchogue-Medford High School made history as the first high school in Suffolk County to install a synthetic turf field.

The school boasts amenities, including a state-of-the-art auditorium, two cafeteria areas, two full-sized gymnasiums, and two dedicated weight rooms. Administrative operations are streamlined with a central main office, three dean offices, a guidance office, and an attendance office.

To ensure safety and security, a police officer is present on campus throughout the school day, further enhancing the well-being of students and staff.

== Notable alumni ==
- Kevin Connolly (1992) – Actor, director, and producer
- Kyra Hoffner (1988) - Delaware state senator
- Biz Markie (1982) – Musician
- Michael P. Murphy (1994) – United States Navy SEAL officer and Medal of Honor recipient
- Paul O'Neill (1975) – Record producer and songwriter
- Paul Regina (1974) – Actor and screenwriter
- Jeff Schaefer (1978) – Professional baseball player
- Renée Felice Smith – Actress, producer, director, and screenwriter
- Marcus Stroman (2009) – Professional baseball player
- Joshua Block (2021) - Social media personality known as "worldoftshirts"
