= Patchogue-Medford School District =

Unified School district in the U.S. state of New York

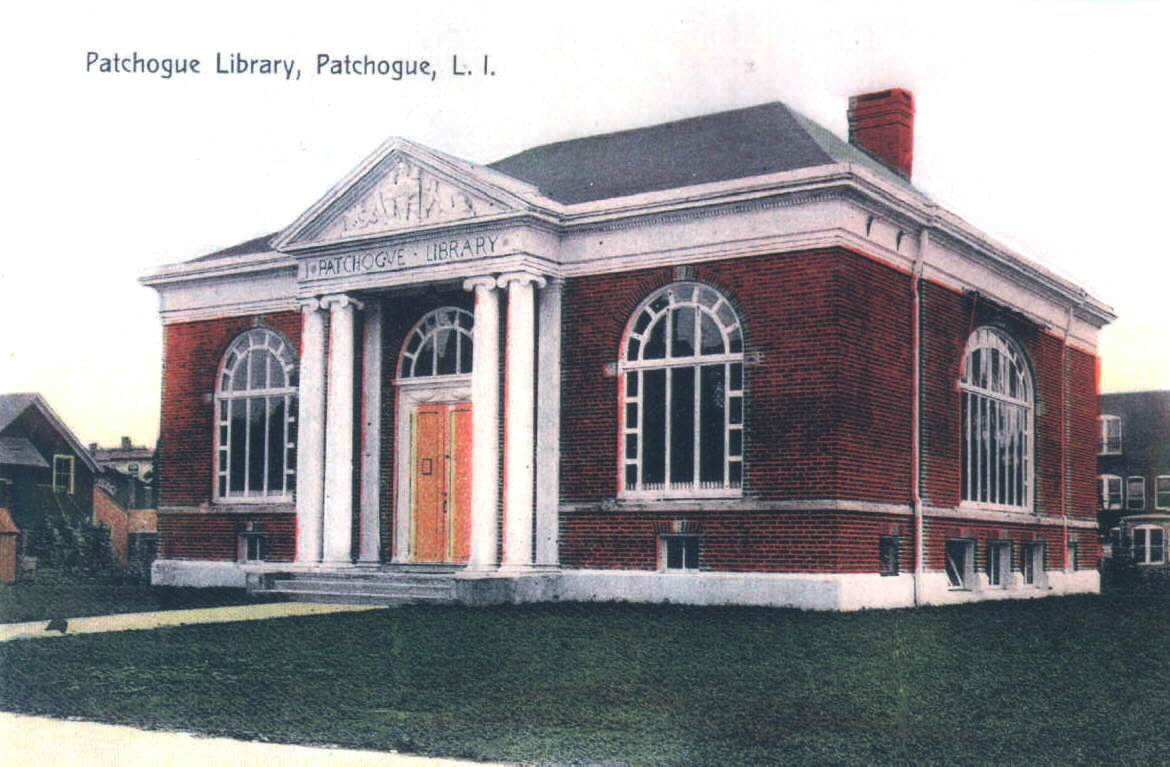
- Pat-Med's Carnegie Library in 1908

Location
- Patchogue, Suffolk County, New York; United States

District information
- Type: Public
- Motto: "Where Education Is Met With Excellence"
- Grades: K-12
- Established: 1854
- President: Kelli Anne Jennings
- Vice-president: Jennifer Krieger & Francis Salazar
- Superintendent: Patrick Harrigan, Ed.D.
- Asst. superintendent(s): Joey Cohen Ed.D., Jessica Lukas Ed.D., Frank Mazzie, & Michelle Marrone
- Governing agency: Brookhaven Public Schools System
- Schools: 11 Schools, 3 closed.
- Budget: $241,343,722 (2024-25)
- NCES District ID: 3622470

Students and staff
- Students: 7,450-10,235
- Teachers: 641
- District mascot: The Raiders
- Colors

Other information
- Graduation Rate: 88%
- District Offices: 241 South Ocean Avenue Patchogue, NY 11772
- Website: pmschools.org

Patchogue-Medford School District is a public school district on Long Island, New York, that covers approximately 16.0 square miles (41 km^{2}) in the southern part of the Town of Brookhaven in Suffolk County.

It is composed of the municipalities of the entirety of the Village of Patchogue and parts of the Hamlets of Medford, East Patchogue, North Patchogue, and Holtsville, New York.

The total student population as of 2006–2007 was approximately 8,700 students, and 7,463 in 2023-2024. Suburban growth starting in the 1950s led to a student population peak in the 1970s of about 11,000 students, which later dropped to a low of 7,000 before rising again.

== Schools ==
=== High schools ===
Due to the school district type, only one high school is operating.

- Patchogue-Medford High School

=== Middle schools ===
==== Oregon Middle School ====
Oregon Middle School or usually referred simply as "Oregon" is a Middle School located on 109 Oregon Avenue, In Medford, New York. The School building has 2 stories.

==== Saxton Middle School ====
Saxton Middle School or simply "Saxton" is a Middle School located on 121 Saxton Street in East Patchogue, New York. The School building has 2 stories.

==== South Ocean Middle School ====
South Ocean Middle School is a Middle School in the Central Business District of Patchogue, New York. The Building is located next to the District office. The School building has 4 stories.

=== Elementary schools ===
- Barton Elementary School
- Bay Elementary School
- Canaan Elementary School
- Eagle Elementary School
- Medford Elementary School
- River Elementary School
- Tremont Elementary School

=== Former schools ===
- Patchogue High School
- Oregon Avenue Junior High School

=== Libraries ===
- Patchogue-Medford Library
- Patchogue-Medford Library - Medford Branch
- Carnegie Library - Teen Center

== Transportation ==
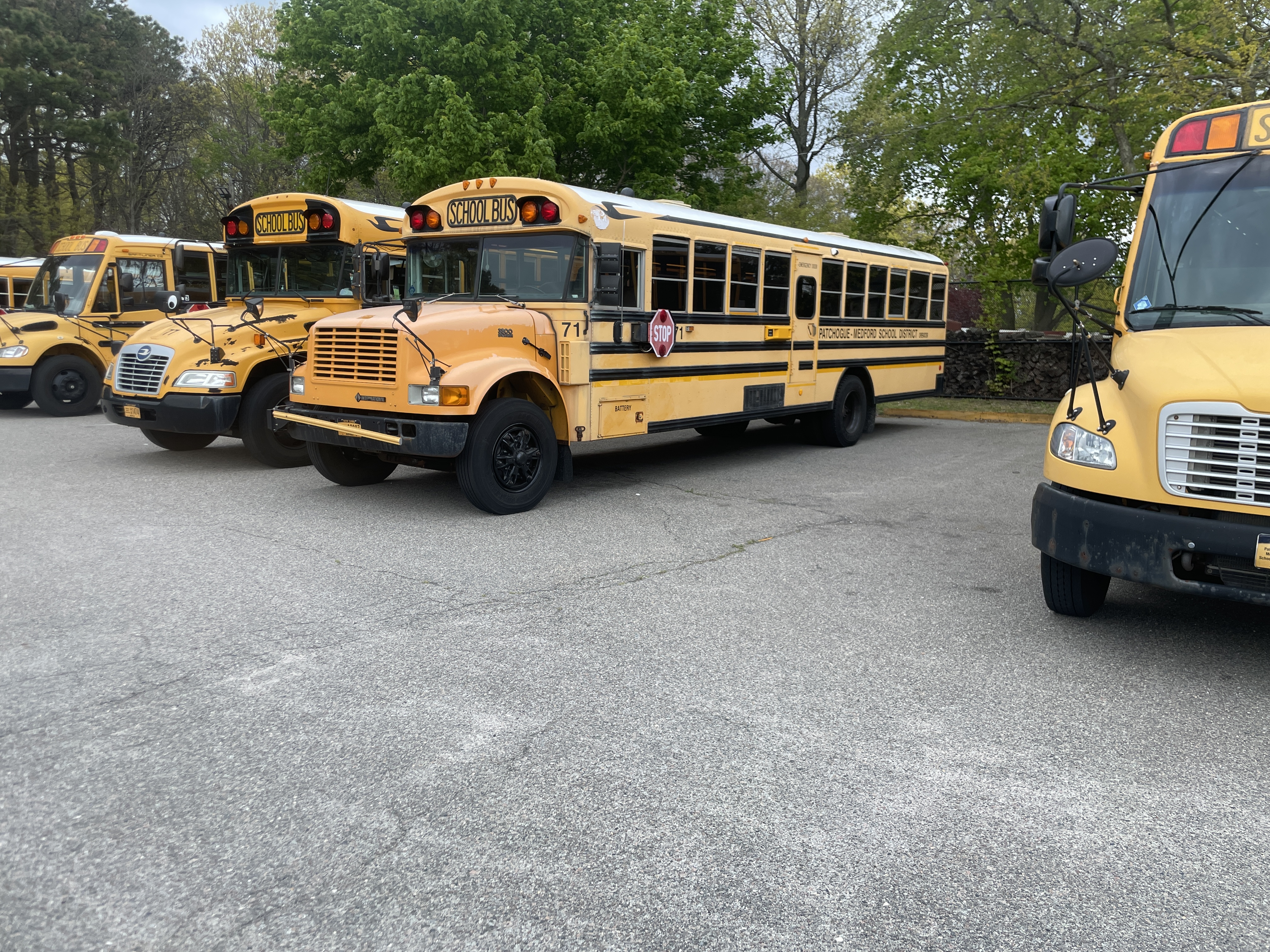
Buses at Saxton Middle School

Transport is provided to high school students living more than 1 1/2 miles from school. The Patchogue-Medford School District owns 11 large buses that serve Patchogue-Medford High School, Saxton Middle School, Barton and Eagle Elementary schools. Other schools contract with Montauk Bus. Students with special needs or living outside the school district's legal boundaries use mini-bus transport provided by Towne Bus Corp.
