= Swan River (New York) =

River in Suffolk County, New York, United States

Coordinates: 40°44′55″N 72°59′51″W

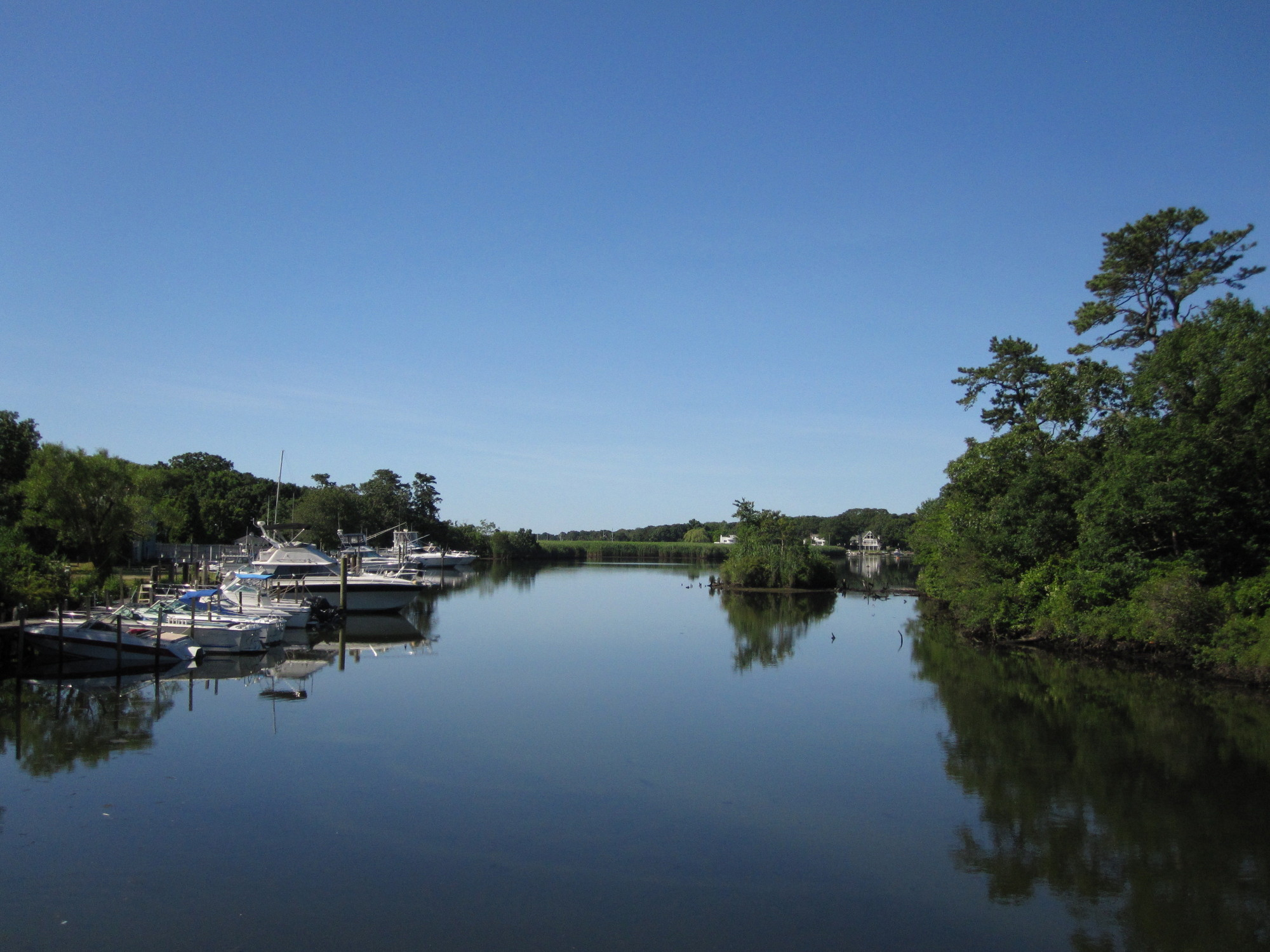
Swan River

The Swan River is in Suffolk County on Long Island, New York. It flows into Swan Lake from the north, and then south out of the lake into the mouth of Patchogue Bay, which then becomes the Great South Bay. Originally, the headwaters reached as far north as Medford, New York, near the vicinity of the Long Island Rail Road's Medford station. Swan River is a relatively clean, cold, free flowing, freshwater stream, generally less than 15 feet wide, with a sandy substrate. This segment of the river flows through much undeveloped forested wetland, but has also been encroached upon by residential development, road construction, and a commercial sand mining operation. Below Montauk Highway, the river is tidal, and is bordered by undeveloped marshland and limited development of boat docking facilities. The fish and wildlife habitat encompasses the entire river, including an approximate one and one-half mile tidal segment, and an approximate two and one-half mile freshwater segment, which extends from Swan Lake, above Montauk Highway, to the headwaters of the stream, above Swan Lake, flowing southward into Patchogue Bay.

Swan River is one of only a few free-flowing, spring-fed streams on Long Island that have remained in a relatively natural state. Above Swan Lake, this creek provides habitat conditions suitable for natural reproduction by brook trout, and supports one of approximately 6 known wild populations of this species on Long Island. In addition to native fish populations in Swan River, concentrations of sea-run brown trout occur in the tidal segment below Montauk Highway, during their fall spawning period (September–November). The concentrations of salmonids in Swan River support a recreational fishery of county-level significance. However, no formal public access to the area has been developed. No unusual concentrations of any wildlife species are known to occur in the area. A few local marinas and untouched wild life are spread throughout its almost 2 mile run There are residential homes spread throughout the river's edge.

== History ==
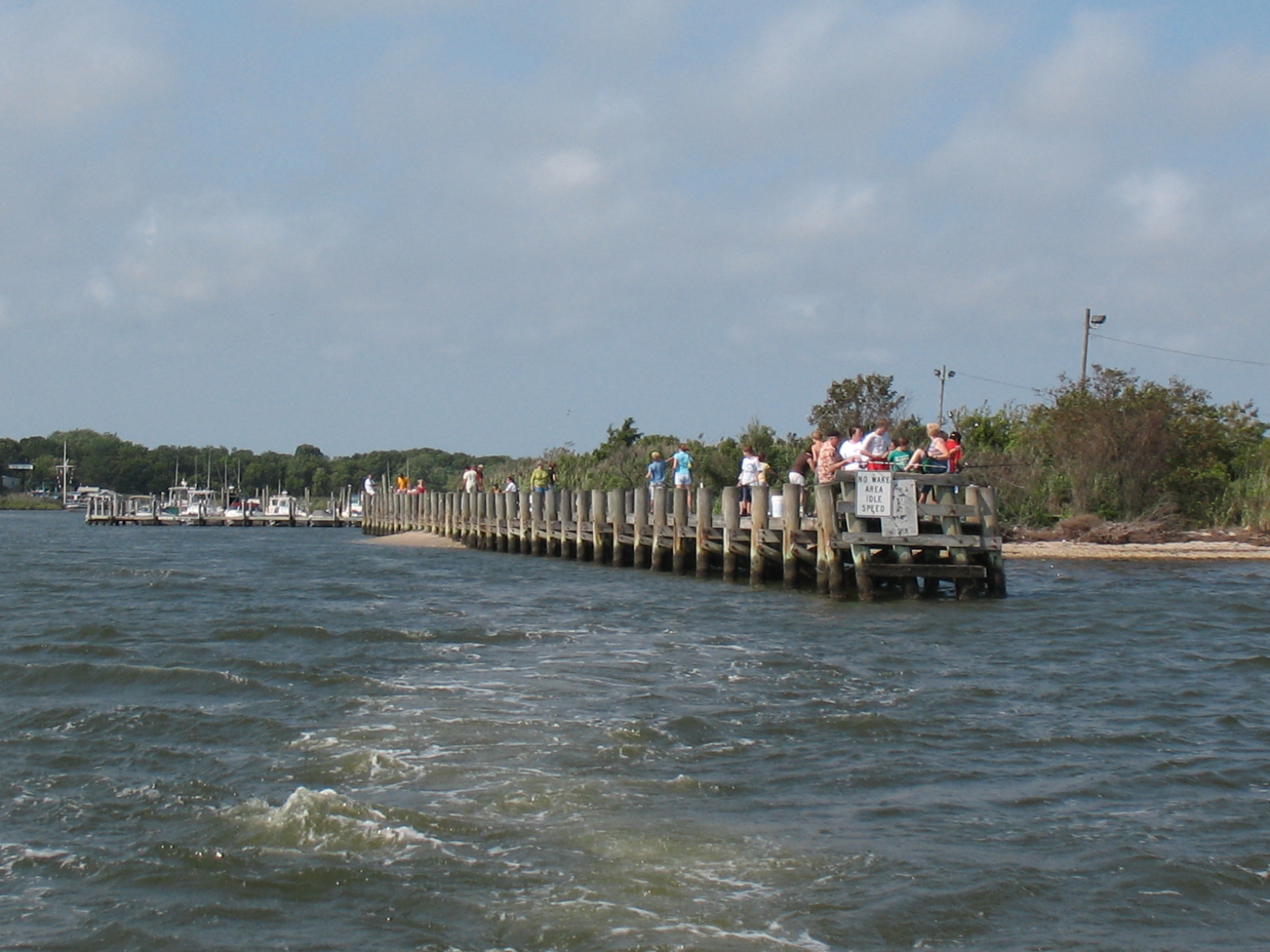
Swan River Inlet

From the 17th century onward, Patchogue was a major maritime center on the south shore. Settled initially by Native Americans, this center was favored by English colonists who traveled from New England to Long Island in the late 17th century, working the bay to harvest shellfish and finfish.

Notable bay families included the Duffys, Flints, Weekses and other families, who purchased property near the creeks in order to dock their boats.

They built shacks which were used as shucking houses, one of which remains on Avery Avenue. Their homes persist as reminders of this rich tradition, primarily in East Patchogue along Swan River Creek on Conklin Avenue.

In the 21st century, not as many baymen still worked the waters of Swan River, Patchogue and the Great South Bay.

== See also ==
- Swan Lake Park
- Pine Neck Boat Ramp
