= Robert Reidt =

Robert Reidt (June 25, 1892 – March 1966) was a German-born American who is best known for promoting a prediction that the world would end on February 6, 1925.

Reidt was a house painter living in Long Island, New York, and heard about Californian Margaret Rowen's claim that the day of judgment was coming on February 6, 1925. Calling himself the "Apostle of Doom", he sold all his assets to spread word of the coming event. After nothing happened at the appointed hour outside his small rented abode in East Patchogue, he later blamed photo flashbulbs for obscuring a supposedly visible sign in the skies. He then suggested the end was coming in the following week. The events received regular front-page coverage in The New York Times and nationwide news coverage.

In February 1926, Reidt made a new prediction that a fireball would soon strike New York City. This event also failed to occur.

He made yet another unsuccessful prediction of doom in 1932.

The last contemporary press coverage that Reidt received was in 1938, in connection with a planetarium trying to publicize a show about end of the world predictions. Reidt died at age 73 in March 1966 in Florida.

== Legacy ==
In May 2011, Reidt's predictions received new coverage when they were reviewed by Andy Newman of The New York Times in connection with Harold Camping's prediction that Judgment Day would fall on May 21, 2011.
