= Swan Lake Park =

Park in New York, United States

Coordinates: 40°46′13″N 72°59′35″W

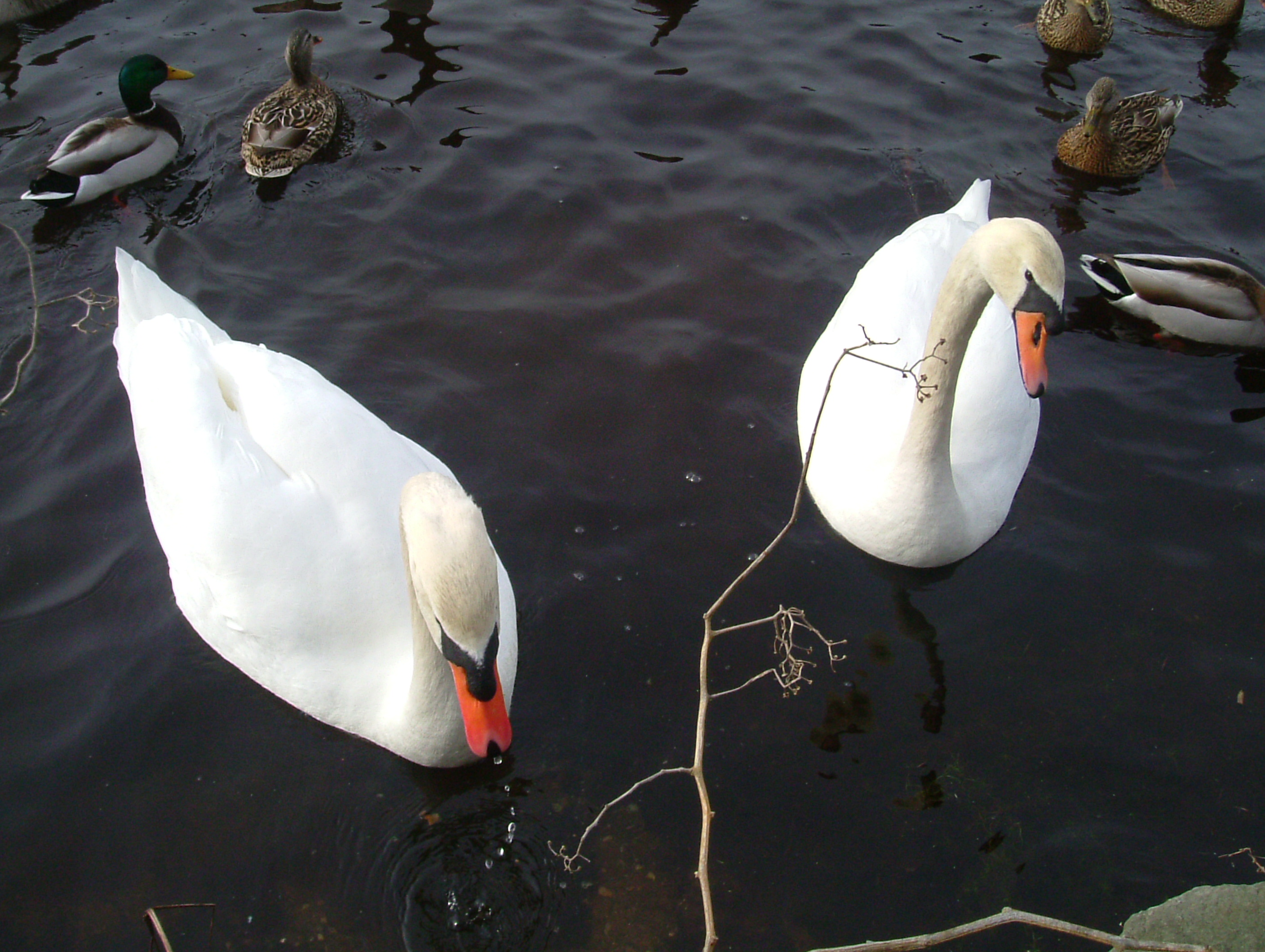
Swan Lake East Patchogue, N.Y.

Swan Lake Park is located on East Main Street, East Patchogue, in the township of Brookhaven, Suffolk County, New York. Swan Lake is nestled between Swan Lake drive on the west side of the lake and Lake drive to the east of the lake.

The park has a variety of Long Island ducks, swans, birds, fish, etc., and a natural flowing lake that empties into the Swan River. The park has a small community civic house on the lake which is overseen by the Swan Lake Park Civic Association. Local residents feed the many species of ducks that make this lake their home.

- Area: 30 acres
- Maximum depth: 7 feet

Species Present (naturally reproducing):

- Largemouth Bass
- Pumpkinseed
- Yellow Perch
- Brown Bullhead

Species Present (stocked):

- Brown Trout
- Rainbow Trout

== See also ==
- East Patchogue
