= Smith-Rourke House =

Historic house in New York, United States

- U.S. National Register of Historic Places
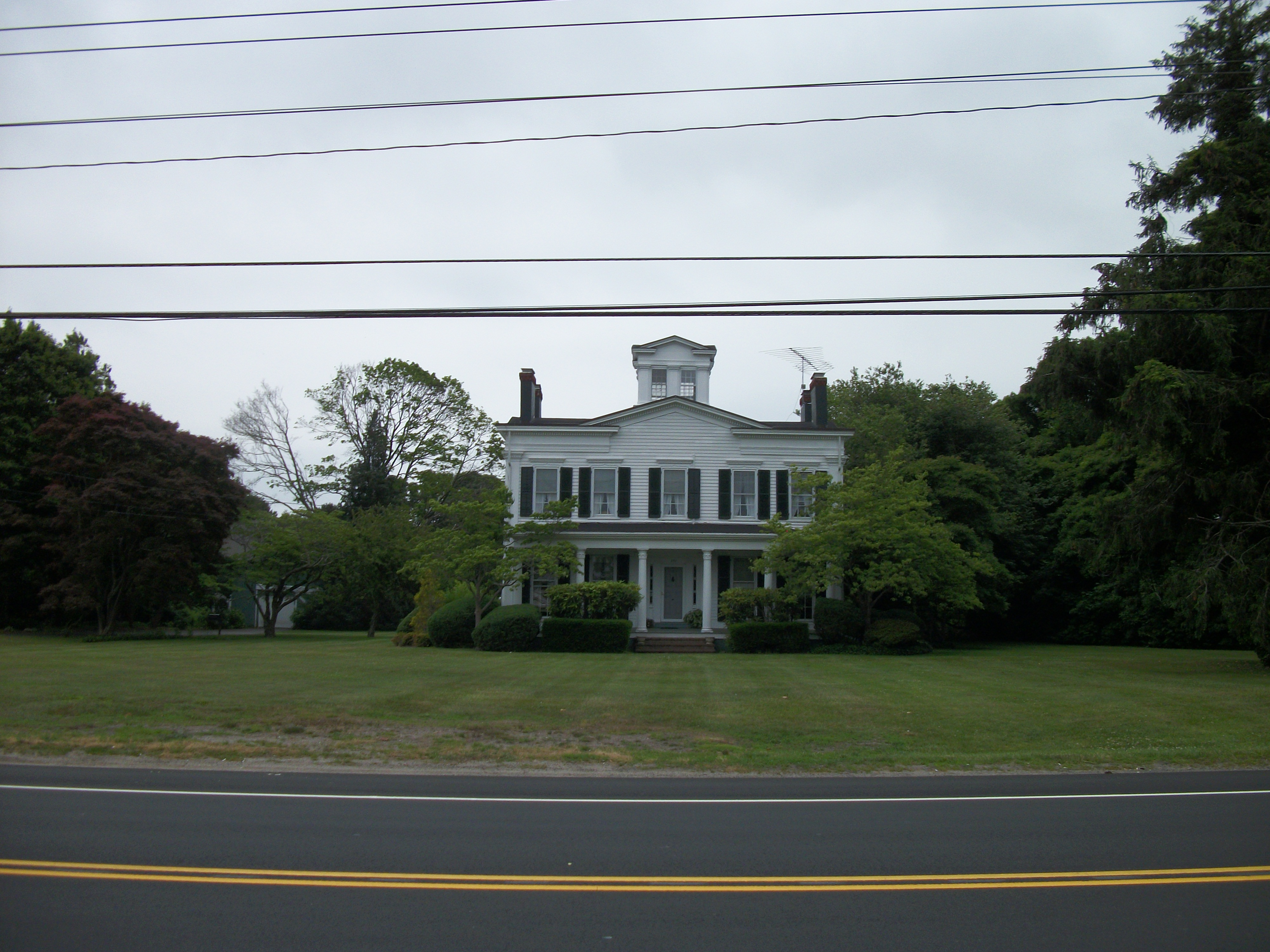

- Location within New York Location within the United States
- Location: 350 South Country Road, East Patchogue, New York
- Coordinates: 40°45′43″N 72°58′44″W
- Area: less than one acre
- Built: 1837
- Architectural style: Greek Revival, Italianate
- NRHP reference No.: 89002021
- Added to NRHP: November 28, 1989

Smith-Rourke House is a historic home located at East Patchogue in Suffolk County, New York. It was built in 1837 and is a large two story, five-bay, generally square dwelling that measures approximately 32 by 40 feet. The house features a low sloping hipped roof of tin with a central cupola and cross gables on all four sides, characteristic of the Italianate style. It also features a profusion of heavy, bold Greek Revival style ornamentation. Also on the property is a small carriage shed.

It was added to the National Register of Historic Places in 1989.
