= Hagerman National Wildlife Refuge =

Nature reserve in northwestern Grayson County, Texas, United States

- IUCN category IV (habitat/species management area)
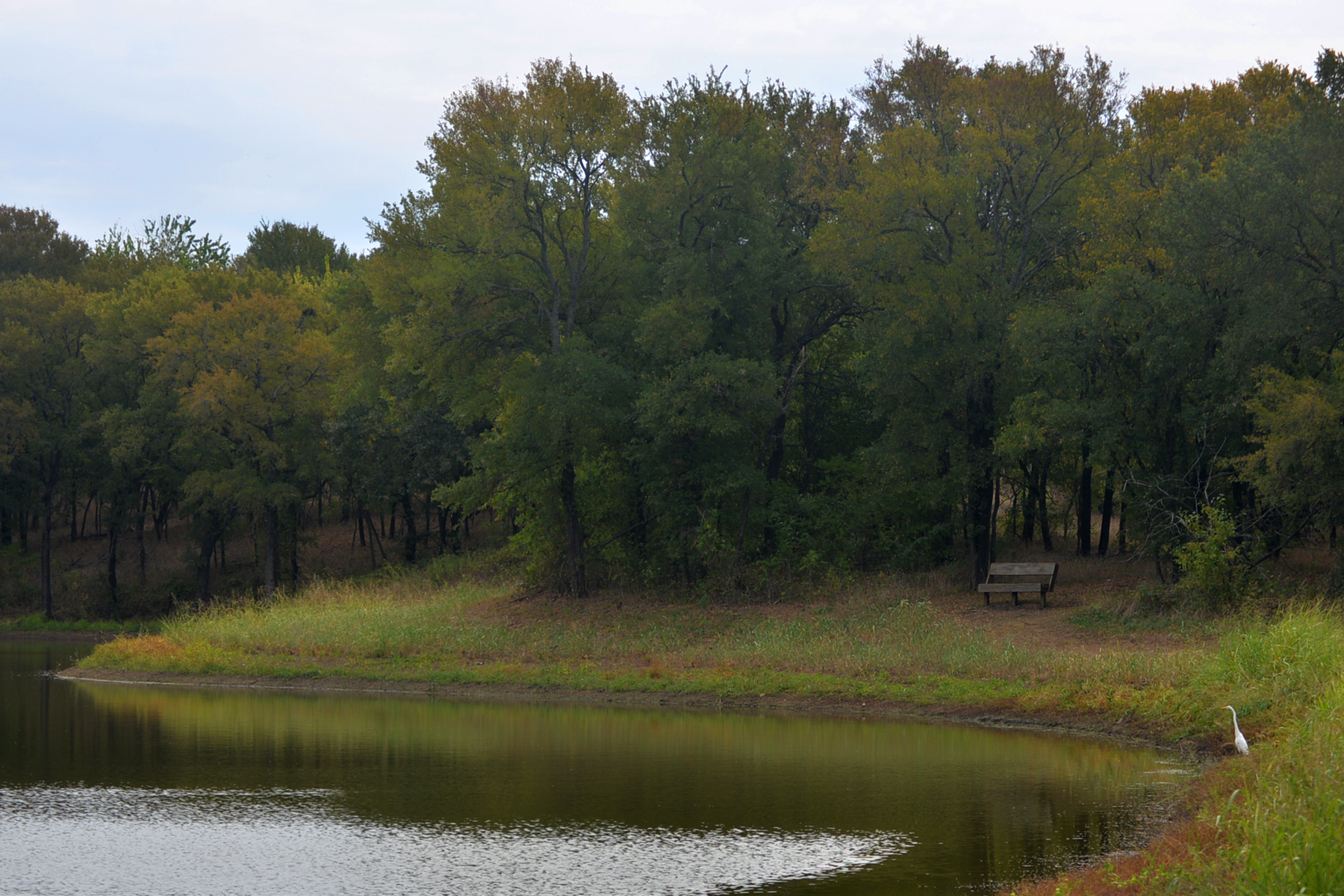

- Location within the United States
- Location: Grayson County, Texas, United States
- Nearest city: Whitesboro, Texas
- Coordinates: 33°42′53″N 96°47′22″W
- Area: 11,320 acres (45.8 km^{2})
- Established: 1946
- Governing body: U.S. Fish and Wildlife Service
- Website: Hagerman National Wildlife Refuge

Hagerman National Wildlife Refuge (HNWR), a haven for migratory birds and other wildlife, lies in northwestern Grayson County, Texas, on the Big Mineral Arm of Lake Texoma, on the Red River between Oklahoma and Texas. This National Wildlife Refuge is made up of water, marsh, and upland habitat. Visitors can hike, observe wildlife, hunt, and fish throughout the year.

The main focus at HNWR is providing a winter home for thousands of waterfowl. The Canada goose is the predominant species; the population of this species can exceed 7,500 during fall, winter, and spring. Other species include the greater white-fronted goose and snow goose, with a few of the smaller Ross's goose.

== Wildlife and habitat ==
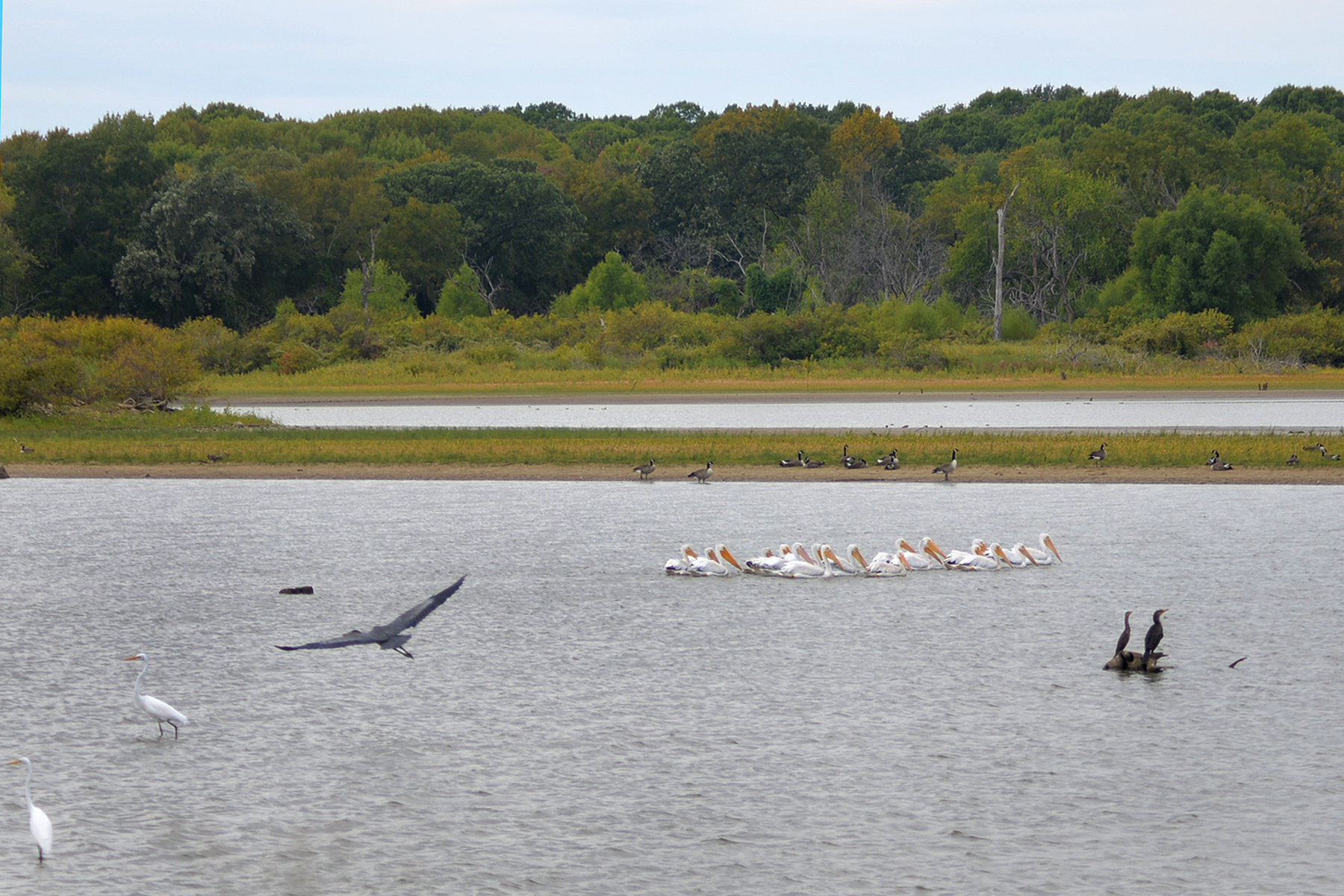
Birds at the Hagerman NWR: great egrets (Ardea alba) left, great blue heron (Ardea Herodias) in flight, American white pelicans (Pelecanus erythrorhynchos) center, double-crested cormorants (Phalacrocorax auratus) right, Canada geese (Branta canadensis) rear

HNWR is located in a transitional zone between two major vegetational areas known as Blackland Prairies and Eastern Cross Timbers. The Blackland Prairies, consisting of black, waxy, clay soils, are found to the east and south of the HNWR, while the sandy soils of the Eastern Cross Timbers are located west of the refuge. Of the refuge's 11,320 acres (45.8 km^{2}), about 2,600 acres (11 km^{2}) are classified as wetlands and 7,278 acres (29.45 km^{2}) are uplands. Of the uplands, 3,740 acres (15.1 km^{2}) are grasslands, 1,500 acres (6.1 km^{2}) are woodlands, and 700 acres (2.8 km^{2}) are croplands with 350 acres (1.4 km^{2}) as administrative lands. Management of the habitat involves a variety of techniques to control and enhance habitat conditions. The primary objective of habitat management is to provide wildlife species with diverse habitats to meet a variety of requirements for resting, feeding, and nesting. Habitat is fundamental for self-sustaining populations of wildlife and plants, as well as for functional ecosystems. The goal of the HNWR is to conserve wildlife species by protecting and restoring the habitat on which they depend.

HNWR supports a diversity of plants and animals of the Red River Basin. These species, including plants, game and nongame vertebrates, and invertebrates, are all important contributors to the overall ecosystem and its biodiversity. Conservation of migratory birds is often considered the central connecting theme of the refuge system. Around 50 species of waterfowl and other migratory game birds have been priorities since the 1930s. It was established to provide habitat for "migratory birds and other wildlife", such as ducks, shorebirds, geese, and cranes. Species that depend on them, especially during the winter or as migratory bird stopover habitats include bald eagles, snow geese, Ross’ geese, Canada geese, and white-fronted geese. Species documented on the refuge include 34 mammals, 316 birds, 65 reptiles and amphibians, and 62 fish. Management of many of these species remains a collaborative effort with the Texas Parks and Wildlife Department. Its rich mixture of tallgrass prairie, riverine bottomland hardwood forest, and wetland habitats also supports other rare and declining migratory birds, particularly Neotropical songbirds and federally listed species. They also represents the largest tract of contiguous native habitat in Grayson County.

The HNWR is located within the Central Flyway, a route traveled annually by numerous species of waterfowl and other migratory birds. The refuge enjoys a reputation as a premier bird-watching destination in North Texas. Although a total of 316 bird species has been recorded on the refuge since it was established in 1946, recent surveys show 273 different bird species are regularly found at HNWR, of which 80 species nest and 193 are migratory. Painted buntings, cardinals, scissor-tailed flycatchers, blue grosbeaks, eastern meadowlarks, northern mockingbirds, blue jays, and red-bellied woodpeckers are common nesting birds. Neotropical migrants such as warblers, tyrant flycatchers, tanagers, orioles, sparrows, and others pass through them each spring and fall, with many of these species remaining to nest. Game birds on the refuge include the mourning dove, northern bobwhite, and wild turkey. Many declining species either occasionally or commonly occur on the refuge including the American golden plover, prothonotary warbler, painted bunting, and Hudsonian godwit. The refuge attracts 15 species of raptors during the fall and spring migration periods, including the osprey, rough-legged buzzard, Swainson's hawk, Northern Harrier, sharp-shinned hawk, and Cooper's hawk. The refuge provides excellent wintering habitat for Bald Eagles, particularly along Lake Texoma. Nesting raptors include the red-tailed hawk, red-shouldered hawk, Mississippi kite, American kestrel, and the broad-winged hawk.

== Refuge management activities ==
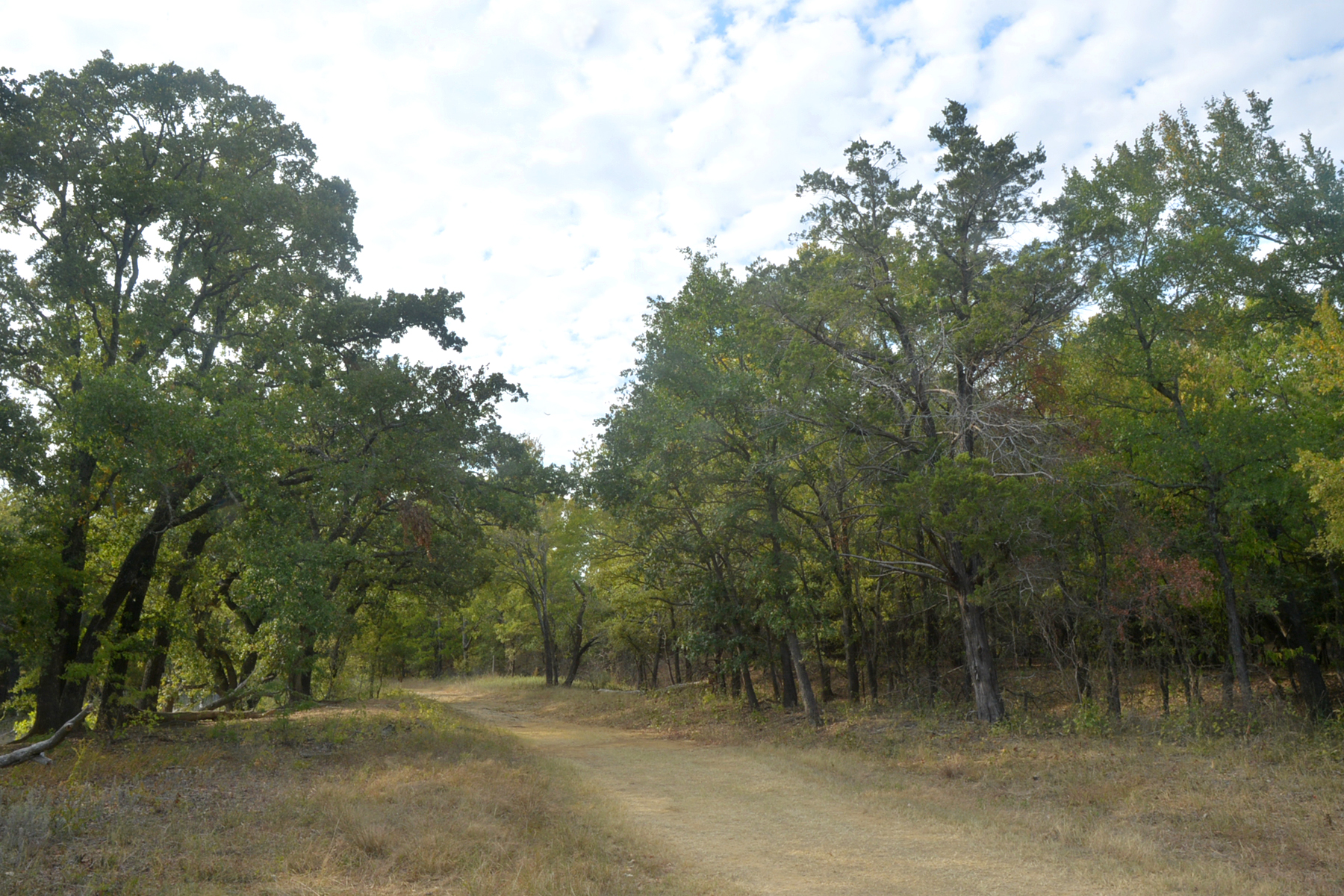
Upland forest, Haller's Haven Trail, Hagerman NWR (Oct 2022)

The management objectives of the HNWR contribute to the objectives of the Central Flyway Management Program. It serves the objectives of its establishment by providing a protected roost site for geese and quality winter habitat to sustain the condition of migratory waterfowl for spring migration and reproductive success. Maintaining the health and condition of the birds wintering at them affects their spring migrational and reproductive successes each year. One of their outstanding features is the high concentrations of wintering and migratory waterfowl. Up to 7,500 Canada geese, 10,000 snow geese, and 100 white-fronted and Ross’ geese winter on them. Canada geese show up around October, followed by snow geese in November. They remain until March, when they return to their northerly breeding grounds. North American duck populations have rebounded from low levels in the 1980s and early 1990s, primarily due to greatly improved habitat conditions in northern breeding areas and wetland conservation efforts in wintering areas. The greatest numbers of ducks are in the fall and spring, with peak numbers sometimes approaching 20,000 in October. Long-legged wading birds attract almost as much attention on them as the waterfowl—the great blue heron, great egret, snowy egret, little blue heron, and American white ibis all use wetlands of HNWR for foraging.

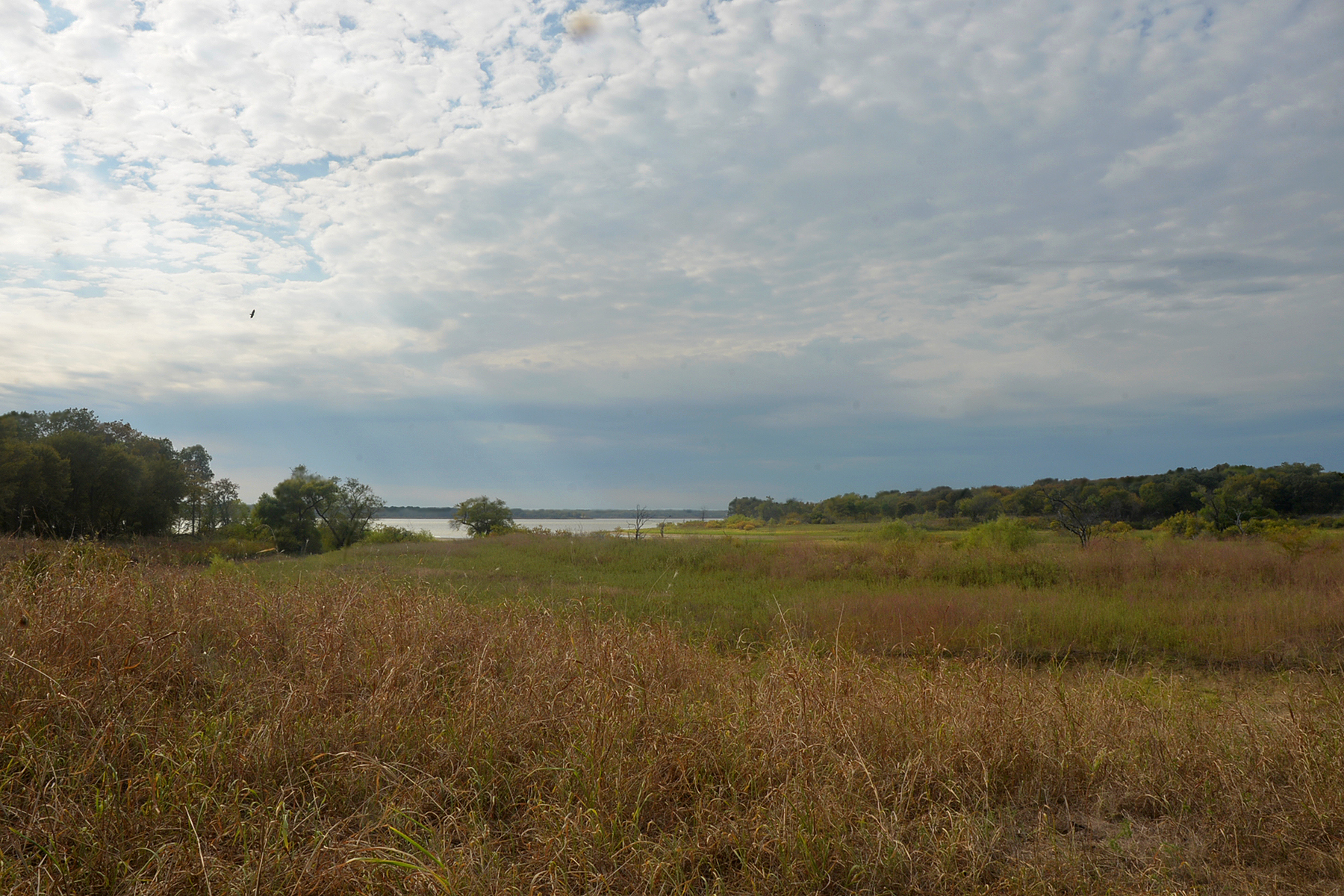
Grassland, Haller's Haven Trail, Hagerman NWR (Oct 2022)

Agricultural practices on them are primarily directed toward providing forage for wintering geese. Refuge cropland use is planned and implemented to produce at least 150,000 lb (68,000 kg) of "hot foods", and about 175,000 lb (79,000 kg) of browse to meet the forage requirements of geese, ducks, and other wildlife for the critical period of December and January. About 700 acres (2.8 km^{2}) of the refuge are planted with winter wheat, millet, and corn. These crops are grown to be made available to wintering waterfowl and other wildlife from October through February. White-tailed deer also use these areas for food and cover. Its personnel and one cooperative farmer plant and manage about 600 acres (2.4 km^{2}) annually, mostly in wheat, for wildlife including geese, deer, and turkey. Moist soil units (MSU) are managed to provide habitat for waterfowl, long-legged wading birds, and other shorebirds. Water levels are lowered during spring migrations to provide forage for shorebirds passing through the area. During summer, the MSUs are drained to allow vegetation to grow. Reflooding occurs during late summer and early fall for wintering waterfowl that arrive beginning in late August. Up to 70,000 great white pelicans use refuge waters during their annual spring and fall migrations.

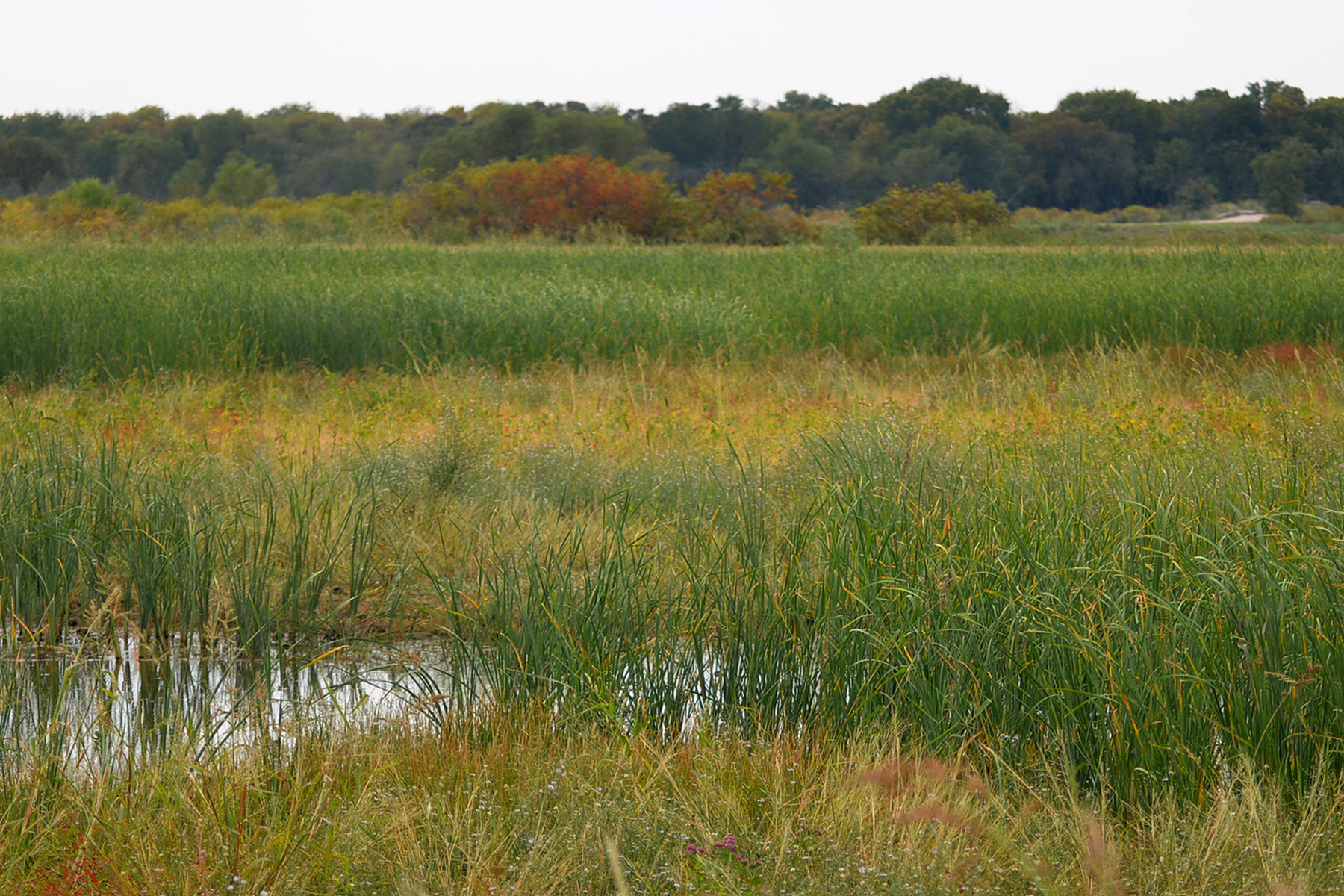
Marshlands, Hagerman NWR (Oct 2022)

Fire management activities on the HNWR consist of prescribed burning and the control of wildfires. It has one or two wildfires every few years, especially during times of drought. The frequency of fires depends upon annual rainfall. Some fires are caused by passing trains and lightning strikes, but occasional arson fires also occur. Adjacent landowners graze native grasslands and tame grass pastures very close to the ground, so chances of wildfires on private lands is low. Although fire is a natural part of prairie ecology, uncontrolled wildfire can threaten dwellings, livestock, haystacks, field forage, and structures such as fences, sheds, and feeders. Refuge wildfires are not common and are generally suppressed. Prescribed burning is an important management tool for maintaining the prairie and edge associations by reducing grassland invasion by woody species, reducing accumulated grassland litter, stimulating the growth of warm-season perennial grasses, and reducing flammable accumulations to reduce the wildfire hazard.

=== Friends of Hagerman ===
Friends of Hagerman is a nonprofit organization that supports the HNWR. This organization has more than 100 members and hosts free, monthly interpretive/educational programs. They also conduct offsite outreach programs and are a strong voice of support in the community. Friends of Hagerman website

== Oil and gas production ==
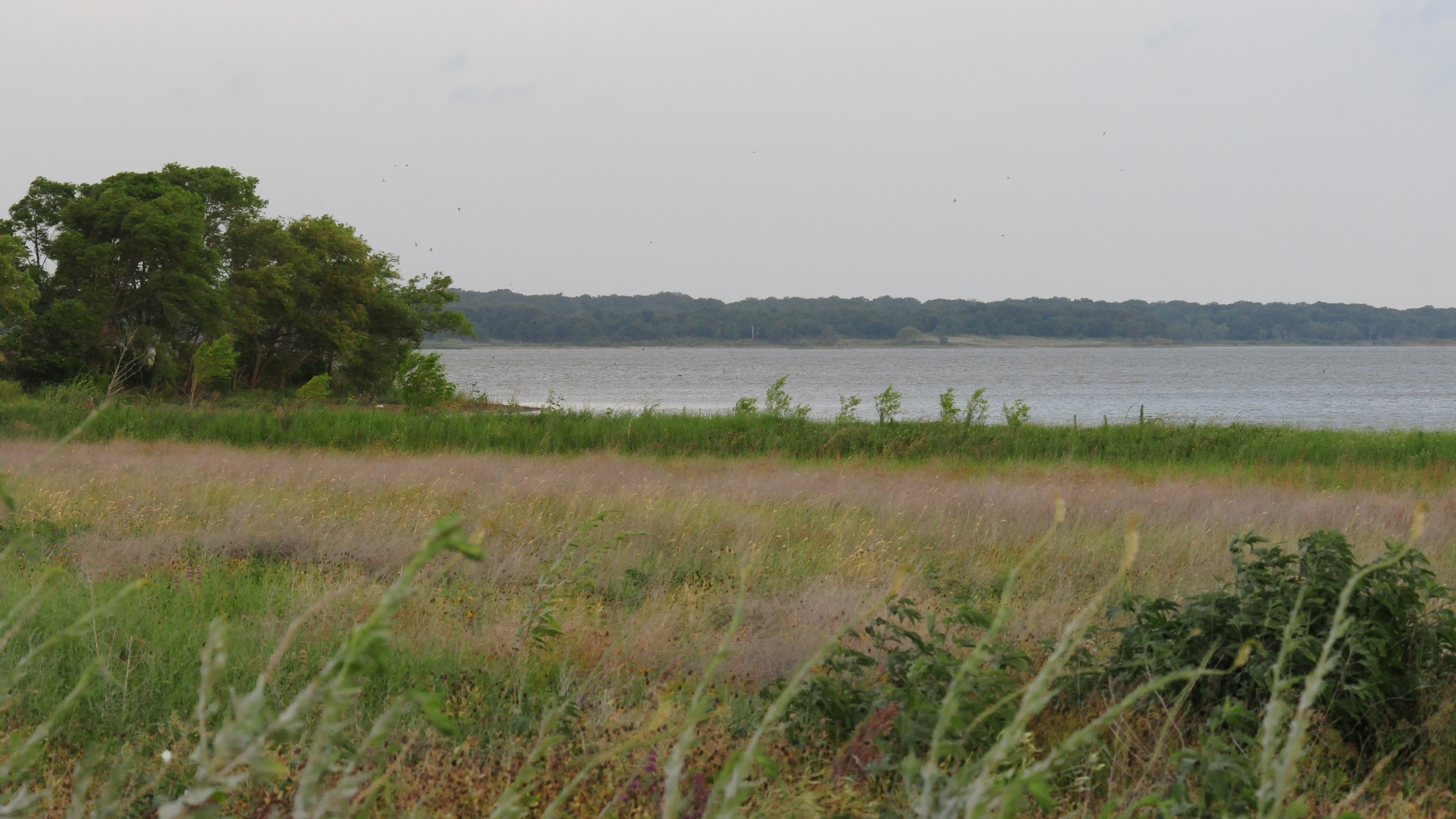
Hagerman National Wildlife Refuge (June 2011)

Shortly after the establishment of the HNWR in 1946, oil and gas deposits were discovered on the refuge. Exploration and drilling activities soon occurred on the refuge and throughout the surrounding area. When the United States Army Corps of Engineers (USACE) acquired the lands necessary for the Denison Dam project, they did not purchase the mineral rights. As a result, it was established on surface lands owned by USACE with subsurface mineral rights remaining in private ownership. At the time the first oil well was drilled, no one had any idea of the coming magnitude of oil and gas activities that would eventually occur at them. During the "oil boom" years from 1951–1957, oil and gas activities continued to increase. Oil and gas activities continue to take place on wildlife refuges for a number of reasons. On the majority of refuges, oil or gas activities occur where private entities, states, or native corporations, rather than the federal government, own the mineral rights. Owners of these mineral rights have the right to develop, produce, and transport the oil and gas resources located within a refuge. However, the regulations of the United States Department of the Interior require mineral owners "to the greatest extent practicable", that "all exploration, development, and production operations" be conducted in such a manner as to "prevent damage, erosion, pollution, or contamination to the lands, waters, facilities, and vegetation of the area". Further, "so far as practicable, such operations must also be conducted without interference with the operation of the refuge or disturbance to the wildlife thereon". Permits for oil and gas activities on the HNWR are issued by the USACE. Their staff review the permits before they are issued and are provided the opportunity to comment on any wildlife and habitat concerns. Special conditions are also included in the permits, such as mitigation for habitat destruction, drilling fluids removal from the drilling site, and returning the site to as natural a condition as possible upon completion of extraction operations. Their personnel have gone to great lengths to establish positive working relationships with the oil companies, resulting in their observance of refuge rules and regulations to help protect fish and wildlife species and their habitats.

== Recreational opportunities ==
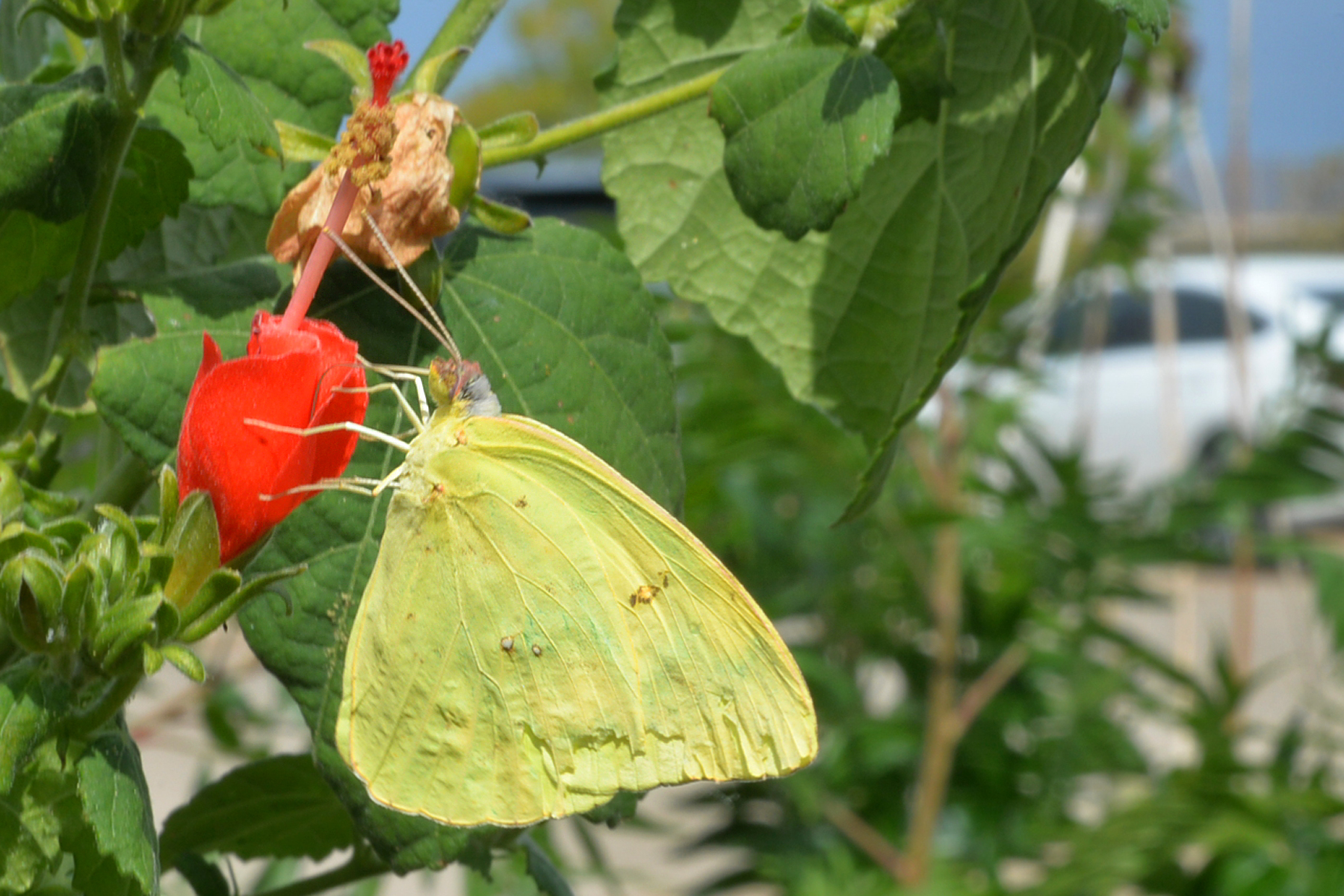
Cloudless Sulphur (Phoebis sennae) on a turk's cap (Malvaviscus drummondii) visitor center butterfly garden, Hagerman NWR (Oct 2022)

Providing recreational opportunities and educating and interpreting the unique natural features of the HNWR for visitors are important elements of the mission and objectives of the HNWR. In the Refuge Improvement Act of 1997, six wildlife-dependent recreational uses were determined priority public uses on national wildlife refuges. These are: hunting, fishing, wildlife observation, wildlife photography, environmental education, and environmental interpretation. These six uses, when compatible with the refuge purpose, are the focus of public use activities at them. These public uses have been determined to be compatible with the purpose for which it was established: limited dove, squirrel, rabbit, and deer hunting; fishing; boating; hiking; picnicking; and berry, nut, and mushroom picking (harvesting only with a special use permit from the Visitor Center). Three established picnic areas are on the HNWR: Goode Unit, Big Mineral Day Use Area, and the Sandy Point Area. The refuge provides an auto tour route, Crow Hill Interpretive Trail, Harris Creek Trail, Meadow Pond Trail, Dead Woman Pond Trail, and other foot-access areas. Special events are offered including educational programs on the second Saturday of every month for children and adults.
