= Hagerman (surname) =

Hagerman is a surname. Notable people with the surname include:

- Amber Hagerman
- Barbara Oliver Hagerman (1943–2016), Canadian classical musician
- Betty Sue Hagerman, American tennis coach
- Christopher Alexander Hagerman (1792–1847), Canadian politician and judge
- Daniel Hagerman (1794–1821), Canadian lawyer and politician
- Douglas Hagerman (born 1960), American businessman
- Helge Hagerman (1910–1995), Swedish actor and film producer
- Herbert James Hagerman (1871–1935), American lawyer and politician
- J. J. Hagerman (1838–1909), American industrialist
- Jamie Hagerman (born 1981), American ice hockey player
- John Hagerman (1881–1960), American long jumper and triple jumper
- Oscar Hagerman (born 1936), Mexican architect
- Rip Hagerman (1888–1930), American baseball player
