= Joshua Block =

Joshua Block may refer to:

- Joshua Block, internet personality associated with Jason Itzler, also known online as World of T Shirts.
- Josh Block, co-founder of the Niles City Sound music studio
