= William C. and Clara Hagerman House =

Historic house in Indiana, United States

- U.S. National Register of Historic Places
- U.S. Historic district – Contributing property
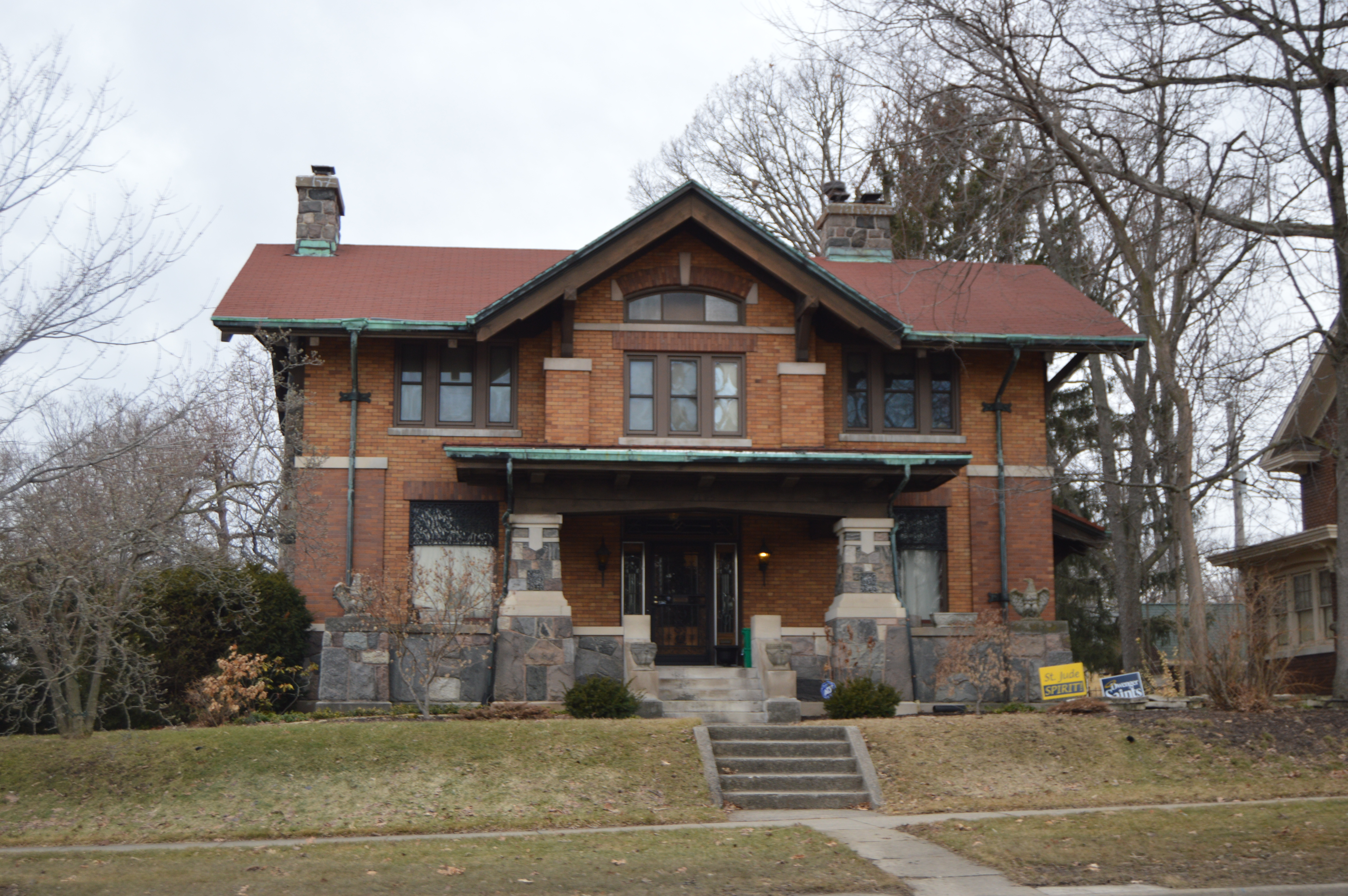
- Front of the house

- Location within Indiana Location within the United States
- Location: 2105 N. Anthony Blvd., Fort Wayne, Indiana
- Coordinates: 41°5′43″N 85°6′57″W
- Area: less than 1.0 acre (0.40 ha)
- Built: c. 1923
- Architectural style: Bungalow / craftsman
- NRHP reference No.: 15000076
- Added to NRHP: March 17, 2015

William C. and Clara Hagerman House is a historic home located at Fort Wayne, Indiana. It was built about 1923, and is a two-story, side gabled, American Craftsman style brick dwelling. The house features wide, overhanging eaves with decorative, exposed triangular braces and leaded glass and colored glass windows. Also on the property is a contributing garage.

The house is named for William C. Hagerman (likely the original owner of the home) and his second wife, Clara Hagerman. William Hagerman, a German immigrant, co-founded a contracting company (Buesching, Hagerman, and Company) which was involved in the construction of various well-known buildings around Fort Wayne, including Lincoln Bank Tower (formerly the tallest building in the state).

It was listed on the National Register of Historic Places in 2015. It is located in the North Anthony Boulevard Historic District.
