= Hagerman, New York =

- Hamlet
- Location within the state of New York
- Country: United States
- State: New York
- County: Suffolk
- Town: Brookhaven

Population (1990)
  - Total: 1,450
- Time zone: UTC−05:00 (Eastern Time Zone)
  - Summer (DST): UTC−04:00
- ZIP Code: 11772
- Area codes: 631, 934
- GNIS feature ID: 951988

Hagerman is a hamlet in the Town of Brookhaven in Suffolk County, on the South Shore of Long Island, in New York, United States.

The population was 1,450 at the 1990 census. It once had a Long Island Rail Road station between 1890 and 1929. The community was built by the Hagerman Land Company, which also built North Bellport, New York.

Hagerman is now part of the East Patchogue, New York census-designated place, but it still survives as a locally known place-name in names such as the Hagerman Fire Department.
