= North Anthony Boulevard Historic District =

Historic district in Indiana, United States

- U.S. National Register of Historic Places
- U.S. Historic district
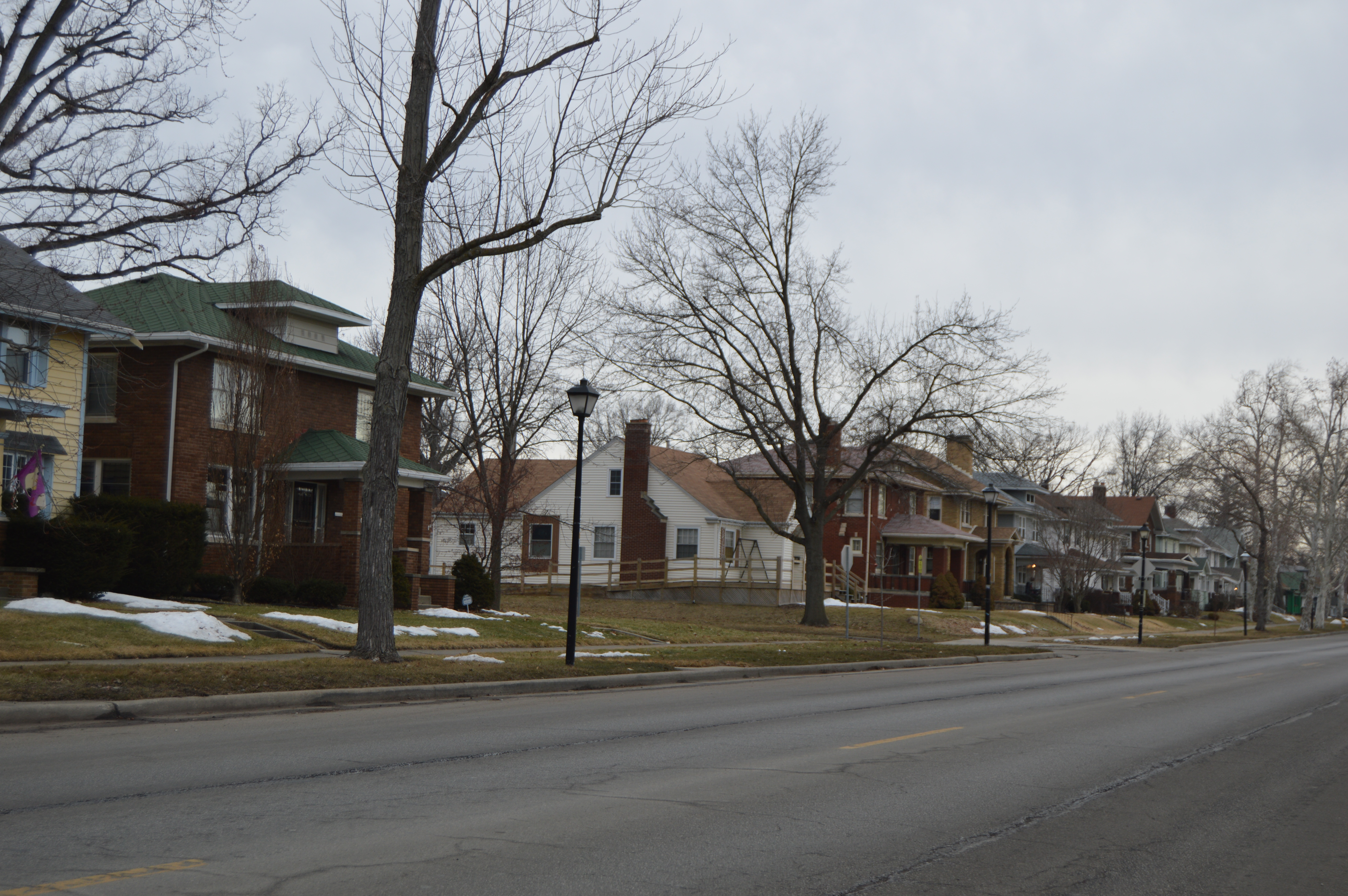
- North Anthony Boulevard Historic District, January 2014

- Location within Indiana Location within the United States
- Location: Roughly N. Anthony Boulevard between Vance and Lake Aves., Fort Wayne, Indiana
- Coordinates: 41°06′00″N 85°06′56″W
- Area: 44.4 acres (18.0 ha)
- Built: c. 1918-1930
- Architectural style: Tudor Revival, Colonial Revival, Bungalow / craftsman et al.
- MPS: Park and Boulevard System of Fort Wayne, Indiana MPS
- NRHP reference No.: 14000800
- Added to NRHP: September 30, 2014

North Anthony Boulevard Historic District is a national historic district located at Fort Wayne, Indiana. The district encompasses 296 contributing buildings in a predominantly residential section of Fort Wayne, extending along North Anthony Boulevard from Lake Avenue in the south to Vance Avenue in the north. An overlapping designation includes all of the rights of way in the district, plus those on the rest of North Anthony south to the Maumee River, as well as on South Anthony Boulevard south of the river.

The district is notable for its interaction between the tastes and preferences of private developers and homebuyers with a publicly funded and enacted City Beautiful urban plan. Multiple phases of development occurred along North Anthony, with varying lot widths and home styles conforming to a general pattern favoring uniform setbacks and avenues, originally planted with London plane trees, along its entire length. North Anthony's development is directly related to the implementation of the 1912 plan for Parks and Boulevards for the city of Fort Wayne by city planner and landscape architect George Kessler, prior to which the boulevard was called Walton Avenue, and ended at State Street (then Pfeiffer Avenue).

The majority of the area was developed from about 1918 to 1930, with infill development continuing into the 1950s. These homes include notable examples of Colonial Revival, Tudor Revival, American Foursquare, and American Craftsman bungalow styles of residential architecture. Other styles include English Cottage, Dutch Colonial Revival, Arts and Crafts, and California bungalow. The mode style is American Foursquare, followed by Colonial Revival.

Infill development in the area continued until the 1950s on vacant lots that had missed the pre-war initial phases. These post-war homes are typically built in a ranch or modern style with stone-on-frame and hipped roofs, in an L or U-shaped configuration, or else in an American Small House style.

Located in the district is the separately listed William C. and Clara Hagerman House.

An architectural outlier in the district is the former Memorial Baptist Church (now Saint Joe Community Church). Begun 1958 and completed in the late 1960s, the church was cited in the registration documents as having "historic integrity", but "outside the period of significance" for the nomination. It was recommended that the church be investigated separately for consideration as an individual Mid-century modern nominee.

North Anthony Boulevard was listed on the National Register of Historic Places in 2014. An earlier (2010) designation of the Fort Wayne Park and Boulevard System Historic District includes rights of way on all of Anthony Boulevard to Vance Avenue. This was done though even though the original Kessler plan ended at present-day State Street, because the period of significance was held to continue from Kessler's original plan to 1955, by which time this portion of Anthony was developed.

The North Anthony Boulevard Historic District, along with the neighboring Kensington Boulevard Historic District, is within the boundaries of the North Anthony Area Neighborhood Association, a voluntary neighborhood association which was formed in the 1970s to lobby against widening North Anthony Boulevard to four lanes of traffic.
