= Williams–Woodland Park Historic District =

Historic district in Indiana, United States

- U.S. National Register of Historic Places
- U.S. Historic district
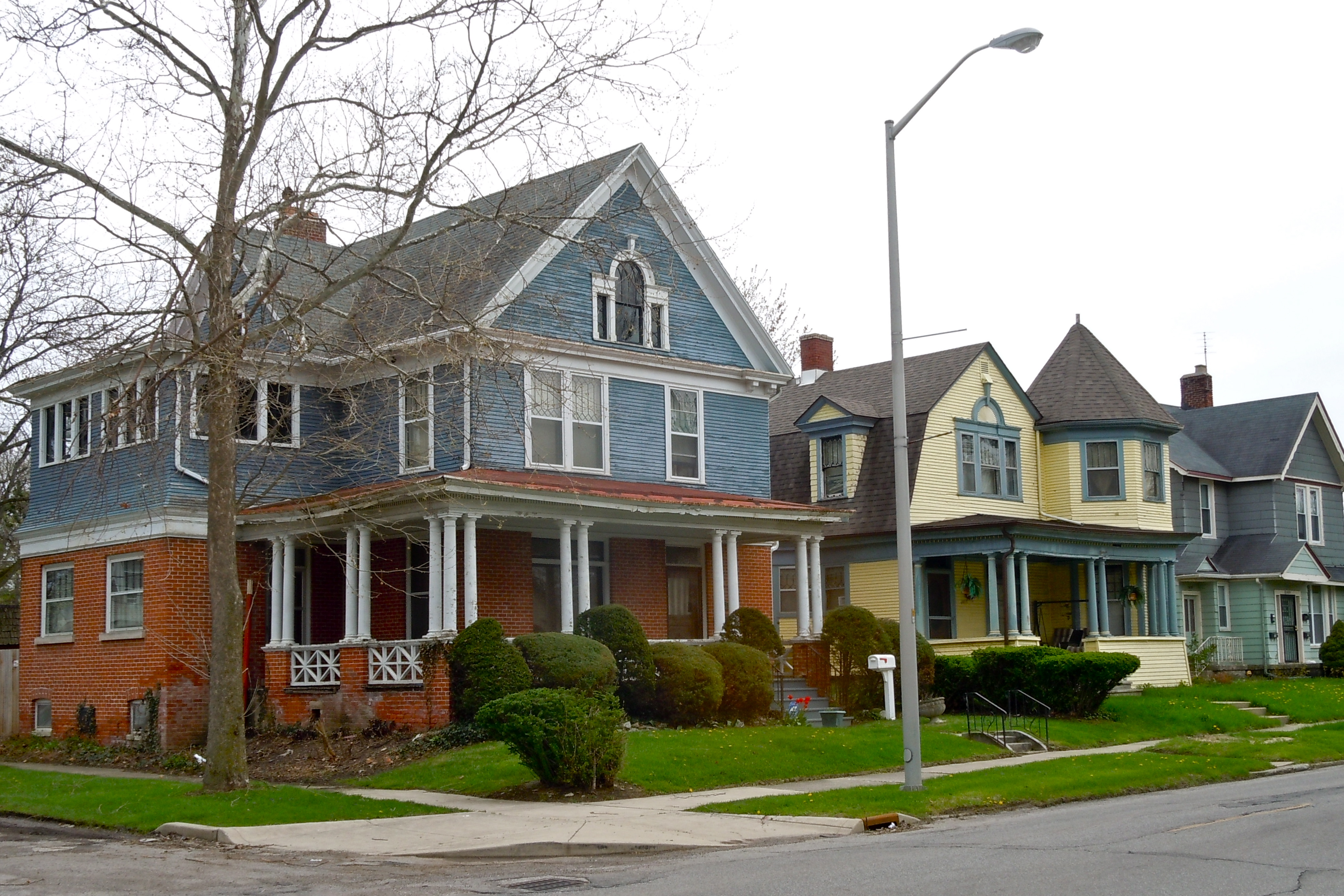

- Location within Indiana Location within the United States
- Location: Roughly bounded by Hoagland and Creighton Aves. and Harrison and Pontiac Sts., Fort Wayne, Indiana
- Coordinates: 41°3′45″N 85°8′28″W
- Area: 42 acres (17 ha)
- Architect: Mahurin, Marshall; Et al
- Architectural style: Colonial Revival, Prairie School, Queen Anne
- NRHP reference No.: 91000258
- Added to NRHP: March 14, 1991

The Williams–Woodland Park Local Historic District was established in 1985 and is a national historic district located at Fort Wayne, Indiana. The district encompasses 287 contributing buildings in a predominantly residential section of Fort Wayne located approximately one mile south of downtown. The area was developed from about 1875 to 1940, and includes notable examples of Colonial Revival, Prairie School, and Queen Anne style residential architecture.

It was listed on the National Register of Historic Places in 1991.
