= Hagerman station =

Former train station in New York, US

Hagerman
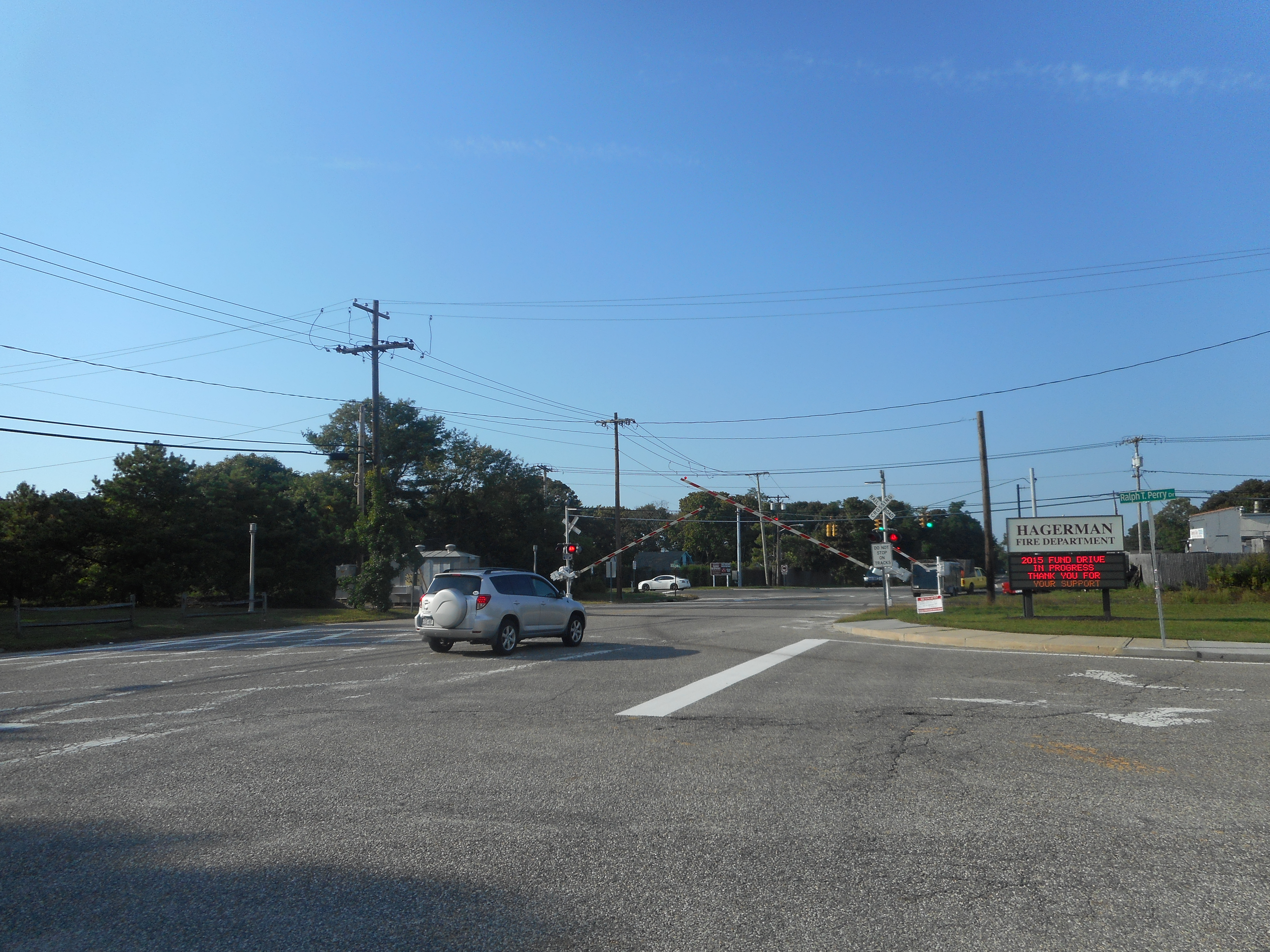
- Site of the former Hagerman LIRR station

General information
- Location: Oakdale Avenue and North Dunton Avenue; Hagerman, New York
- Coordinates: 40°46′12″N 72°57′54″W
- Owner: Long Island Rail Road
- Platforms: 1 island platform
- Tracks: 2

History
- Opened: October 1890
- Closed: 1929
- Rebuilt: No; Station abandoned

Former services
Preceding station	Long Island Rail Road	Following station
Patchogue toward Long Island City	Montauk Division	Bellport toward Montauk
Location

Hagerman was a rail station stop in Hagerman, New York along the Montauk Branch.

== History ==
The station first opened around October 1890, and though little more than a small shack, it was the site of a former experimental electric-powered monorail line. It was later razed and discontinued as a station stop in 1929. It was located between the Patchogue and Bellport stations.

== See also ==
- List of Long Island Rail Road stations
- History of the Long Island Rail Road
