= Forest Park Boulevard Historic District =

Historic district in Indiana, United States

- U.S. National Register of Historic Places
- U.S. Historic district
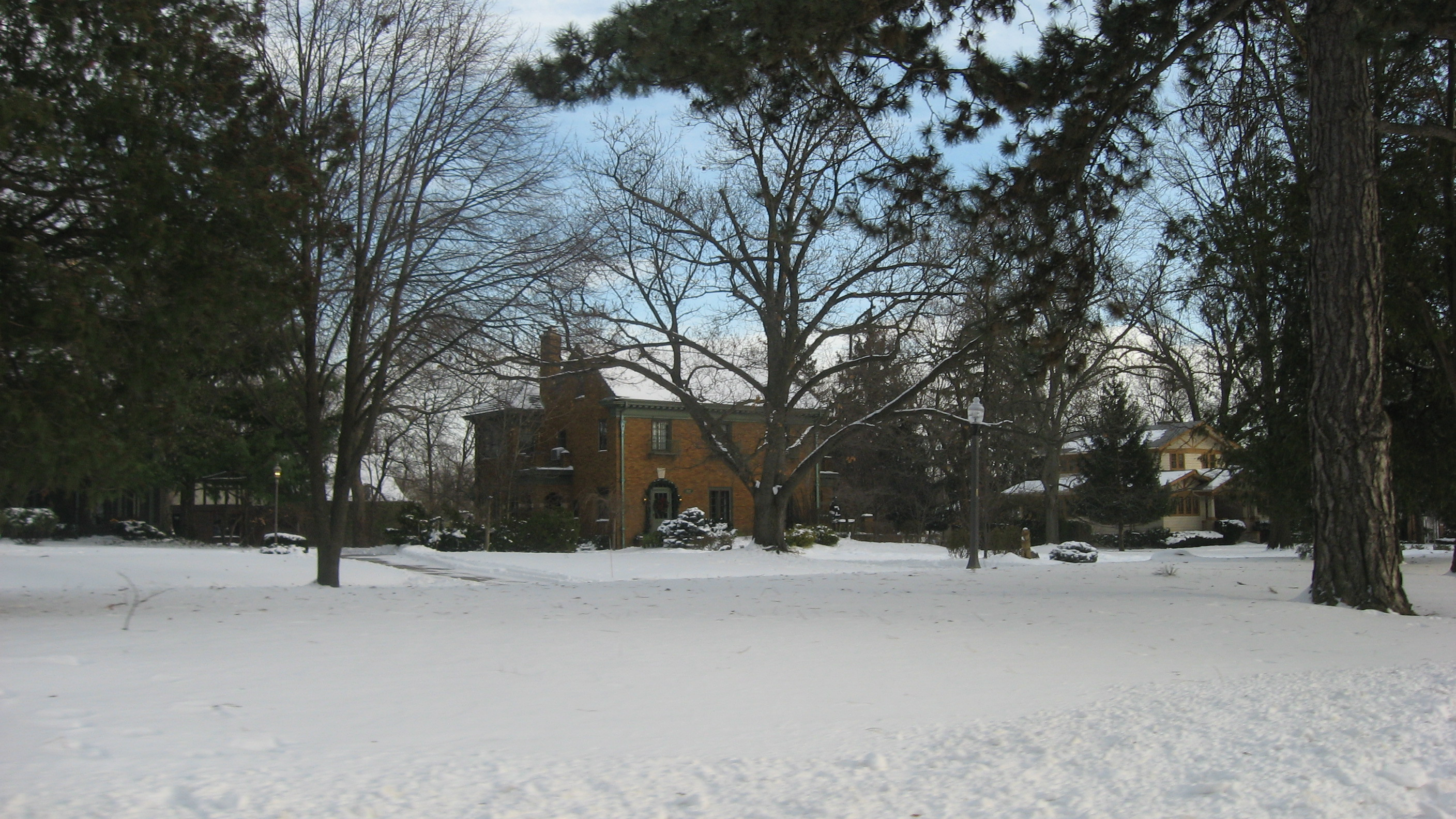
- Eastern side of the boulevard

- Location within Indiana Location within the United States
- Location: Roughly bounded by Dodge Ave., the alley bet. Forest Park Blvd. and Anthony Blvd, Lake Ave. and the alley, Fort Wayne, Indiana
- Coordinates: 41°5′43″N 85°07′03″W
- Built: 1910
- Architect: Charles R. Weatherhogg; Pohlmeyer & Pohlmeyer
- Architectural style: Colonial Revival, Tudor Revival
- MPS: Park and Boulevard System of Fort Wayne, Indiana MPS
- NRHP reference No.: 07000212
- Added to NRHP: March 30, 2007

The Forest Park Boulevard Historic District is a national historic district located at Fort Wayne, Indiana. The district encompasses 93 contributing buildings, 1 contributing site, and 15 contributing objects in a predominantly residential section of Fort Wayne. The area was developed from about 1890 to 1955, and includes notable examples of Colonial Revival and Tudor Revival style architecture. The district features ornamental light posts / streetlights and stone entry markers.

It was listed on the National Register of Historic Places in 2007.
