= Blair =

- Gender: Unisex
- Language: Scots-English

Origin
- Language: Scottish Gaelic
- Origin: Anglicisation of blàr
- Meaning: "plain", "field", "meadow", "battlefield"
- Region of origin: Scotland

Other names
- Variant forms: Blaire, Blare

Blair is a Scots-English-language name of Scottish Gaelic origin.

The surname is derived from any of the numerous places in Scotland called Blair, derived from the Scottish Gaelic blàr, meaning "plain", "meadow" or "field", frequently a battlefield.

The given name Blair is unisex and derived from the surname. Blair is generally a masculine name in Scotland and Canada, although it is more popular in the United States, where it is also a feminine name. A variant spelling of the given name is Blaire and Blare. In 2016, in the United States, Blair was the 521st most popular name for girls born that year, and the 1807th most popular for boys.

== Scottish clan ==
- Clan Blair

== People with the surname ==
- Adam Blair (born 1986), New Zealand rugby league player
- Andrea Blair, New Zealand geothermal consultant
- Andrew M. Blair (1818–???), American politician in Wisconsin
- Andy Blair (footballer) (born 1959) Scottish footballer
- Andy Blair (ice hockey) (1908–1977), Canadian ice hockey player
- Austin Blair (1818–1894), Governor of Michigan
- B. Brian Blair (born 1957), American professional wrestler and local politician
- Bill Blair (disambiguation), several people
- Bonnie Blair (born 1964), American Olympic gold medalist in speed skating
- Bruce G. Blair (1947–2020), American activist
- Cherie Blair (born 1954), British barrister and wife of Tony Blair
- Cheyse Blair (born 1992), Australian Rugby League player
- Clancy Blair, American psychologist
- Danny Blair (1905–1985), Scottish footballer
- David Blair (disambiguation), several people
- DeJuan Blair (born 1989), American basketball player
- Dennis C. Blair (born 1947), United States Director of National Intelligence
- Diane Blair-Sherlock, American politician
- Dick Blair (1937–2013), Australian boxer, later community leader and pastor
- Doug Blair (born 1963), American heavy metal guitarist
- Doug Blair (footballer) (1921–1998), English footballer
- Eddie Blair (1871–1913), American football player
- Eddie Blair (1927–2020), British jazz trumpeter
- Edmund Blair Leighton (1852–1922), English artist
- Ellen A. Dayton Blair (1837–1926), American social reformer and art teacher
- Emily Newell Blair (1877–1951), American writer, suffragette, and founder of League of Women Voters
- Eric Arthur Blair (1903–1950), British author better known by his pen name George Orwell
- Euan Blair (born 1984), British businessman and son of Tony Blair
- Everard Blair (1866–1939), English soldier and cricketer
- Everton Blair (born 1992), American politician
- Francis Preston Blair (1791–1876), American journalist and politician
- Francis Preston Blair Jr. (1821–1875), American politician and American Civil War general
- Francis Simpson Blair (1839–1899), Virginia's Attorney General from 1882 to 1886
- Frederick Blair (1874–1959), director of Canada's Immigration Branch
- Garfield Blair (born 1987), Jamaican basketball player
- George A. Blair (1915–2013), American businessman
- George W. Blair (1921–2020), American politician and rancher
- Gwenda Blair (born 1943), American author and journalist
- Harold Blair (1924–1976), Australian tenor and Aboriginal activist
- Harvey Blair (born 2003), English footballer
- Henry W. Blair (1834–1920), United States Representative and Senator from New Hampshire
- Hugh Blair (1718–1800), Scottish author
- Hugh Blair (composer) (1864–1932), English musician, composer and organist
- Hugh E. Blair (1909–1967), linguist and co-developer of Interlingua
- Iain Blair (1942–2011), Scottish journalist, actor and author
- Ian Blair (1953–2025), British police officer, Commissioner of the Metropolitan Police
- James Blair (Australian judge) (1870–1944), Australian judge
- James Blair (cricketer) (1900–1961), New Zealand cricketer
- James Blair (footballer) (1883–1913), Scottish footballer
- James Blair (Indian Army officer) (1828–1905), Scottish recipient of the Victoria Cross
- James Blair (MP) (1788–1841), Scots-Irish Member of Parliament
- James Blair (South Carolina) (1786–1834), American politician
- James Blair (Virginia) (1656–1743), Scottish clergyman and founder of the College of William and Mary
- James P. Blair (1931–2021), American photographer
- Jayson Blair (born 1976), former New York Times reporter
- Jayson Blair (actor) (born 1984), American actor
- Jimmy Blair (footballer, born 1888) (died 1964), Scottish international footballer
- Jimmy Blair (footballer, born 1918) (died 1983), Scottish professional footballer
- Joe Blair (died 1946), Australian rules footballer, oil industry executive
- Joe F. Blair (1923–1995), American sports publicist
- John Blair Jr. (1732–1800), American politician and Supreme Court judge
- John Insley Blair (1802–1899), American railroad tycoon
- John Leo Blair (1888–1962), American businessman, founder of Blair Corporation
- John T. Blair (1885–1976), American architect
- Joseph Blair (born 1974), American basketball player
- June Blair (1933–2022), American actress and model
- Kenneth Blair (1882–1952), English entomologist
- Lewis Harvie Blair (1834–1916), American businessman and author
- Leo Blair (1923–2012), father of Tony Blair
- Linda Blair (born 1959), American actress
- Lionel Blair (1928–2021), Canadian-born British entertainer
- Marquise Blair (born 1997), American football player
- Mary Blair (1911–1978), American artist, animator
- Matthew Blair (disambiguation), several people
- Maybelle Blair (born 1927), All-American Girls Professional Baseball League player
- Mike Blair (born 1981), Scotland rugby union international
- Montgomery Blair (1813–1883), American politician and lawyer
- Natalie Blair (born 1984), Australian actress
- Patricia Blair (1933–2013), American actress
- Patrick Blair (surgeon) (c. 1670–1728), Scottish surgeon-apothecary
- Paul Blair (disambiguation), several people
- Paul Blair (born 1978), American music producer, songwriter, and DJ better known as DJ White Shadow
- Philippa Blair (1945–2025), New Zealand artist
- Preston Blair (1908–1994), American animator for Disney, MGM, and Hanna-Barbera
- Randy Blair (born 1983), American actor and writer
- Richard Blair (disambiguation), several people
- Robert Blair (disambiguation), several people
- Saira Blair (born 1996), American politician
- Selma Blair (born 1972), American actress
- G. W. Scott Blair (1902–1987), British rheologist
- Seth Blair (born 1989), American baseball player
- Steven Blair (1939–2023), American exercise scientist
- Terry Blair (disambiguation), several people
- Tom Blair (1892–1961), Scottish football goalkeeper
- Tony Blair (born 1953), British politician and Prime Minister of the United Kingdom, 1997–2007
- Vivien Lyra Blair (born 2012), American actress
- Walter Blair (disambiguation), several people
- William Blair (disambiguation), several people
- Wren Blair (1925–2013), Canadian ice hockey coach

== People with the given name ==
- Blair Adams (born 1991), English football player
- Blair Bann (born 1988), Canadian volleyball player
- Blair Brown (born 1946), American actress
- Blair Brown (American football) (born 1994), American football player
- Blair Butler (born 1978), American stand-up comedian
- Blair Chenoweth, winner of the 2003 Miss Alaska pageant and the 2007 Miss Alaska USA pageant
- Blair Dunlop (born 1992), English musician and actor
- Blair Effron (born 1962), American financier and co-founder of Centerview Partners
- Blair Fowler (born 1993), YouTube beauty guru
- Blair Hinkle (born 1986), American professional poker player
- Blair Hopping (born 1980), New Zealand field hockey player
- Blair Horn (born 1961), Canadian rower
- Blair Hull (born 1942), American businessman and politician
- Blair Imani (born 1993), African-American activist
- Blair Joscelyne (born 1978), Australian composer, songwriter, and co-host of Mighty Car Mods
- Blair Kiel (1961–2012), American football player
- Blair Kinghorn (born 1997), Scotland Rugby Union international
- Blair Late (born 1982), American pop singer
- Blair Lee I (1857–1944), Lieutenant Governor of Maryland
- Blair Lee III (1916–1985), Lieutenant Governor of Maryland
- Blair Lekstrom (born 1961), Canadian politician
- Blair Levin (born 1954), American lawyer
- Blair Lewis (born 1956), American gastroenterologist
- Blair Longley (born 1950), Canadian politician
- Blair MacKichan, English musician
- Blair McDonough (born 1981), Australian actor
- Blair Milan (1981–2011), Australian actor and television presenter
- Blair Peach (1946–1979), New Zealand–born activist, a victim of police brutality
- Blair Peters, Canadian animator and co-founder of Studio B Productions
- Blair Phillips (born 1984), American football linebacker
- Blair Redford (born 1983), American actor
- Blair St. Clair (born 1995), American drag queen
- Blair Stewart (ice hockey) (born 1953), Canadian hockey player
- Blair Stewart (rugby union) (born 1983), New Zealand rugby player
- Blair Stewart-Wilson (1929–2011), British army officer
- Blair Sturrock (born 1981), Scottish footballer
- Blair Underwood (born 1964), American actor
- Blair Walsh (born 1990), American football player
- Blair White (born 1987), American football wide receiver
- Blaire White (born 1993), American YouTuber and political commentator
- Blair Wilson (born 1963), Canadian member of parliament

== Fictional characters ==
- Blair (Soul Eater), a character from the manga and anime series Soul Eater
- Blaire Bennett, a main character in the television series Ted
- Blair Cramer, a character in the television series One Life to Live
- Blair Dame, a character in the video game Street Fighter EX
- Blair Waldorf, a character in the novels and television series Gossip Girl
- Blair Warner, a character in the television series The Facts of Life
- Blair, a main character in the animated television series Sunny Day
- Blair Willows (Princess Sophia), a main character in animated film Barbie: Princess Charm School
- Blaire Wilson, an American Girl character
- Blair Pfaff, a main character in the television series Black Monday
- Blair, a main character in the film The Thing

=== Surname ===
- Alison Blaire, a Marvel Comics mutant character
