= Robert Blair =

Robert Blair may refer to:

== Entertainment ==
- Robert Blair (poet) (1699–1746), Scottish poet
- Robert Noel Blair (1912–2003), American painter and sculptor
- Robert Blair (musician) (1930–2001), American gospel musician

== Law ==
- Robert Blair, Lord Avontoun (1741–1811), Scottish lawyer, son of poet Robert Blair
- Robert A. Blair, justice of the Court of Appeal for Ontario
- Robert Blair (politician) (c. 1782–1861), English-born judge and politician in Nova Scotia

== Sports ==
- Robert Blair (cricketer) (1858–1912), New Zealand cricketer
- Bob Blair (cricketer) (1932–2026), New Zealand cricketer
- Robert Blair (badminton) (born 1981), badminton player from Great Britain

== Other ==
- Robert Blair (antiquarian) (1845–1923), English antiquarian and solicitor
- Robert Blair (moderator) (1593–1666), Scottish clergyman
- Robert Blair (minister) (1837–1907), Scottish minister
- Robert Blair (astronomer) (1748–1828), Scottish astronomer
- Robert Blair (VC) (1834–1859), Victoria Cross winner
- Robert M. Blair (1836–1899), American Civil War sailor and Medal of Honor recipient
- S. Robert Blair (1929–2009), Canadian businessman
- W. Robert Blair (1930–2014), American politician
- Robert Blair (farmer) (born 1968), specializing in precision agriculture and Unmanned Air Vehicles
- Robert Blair (political advisor) (born 1972), American official

== See also ==
- Blair
