= Arthur Asahel Shurcliff =

American landscape architect (1870–1957)

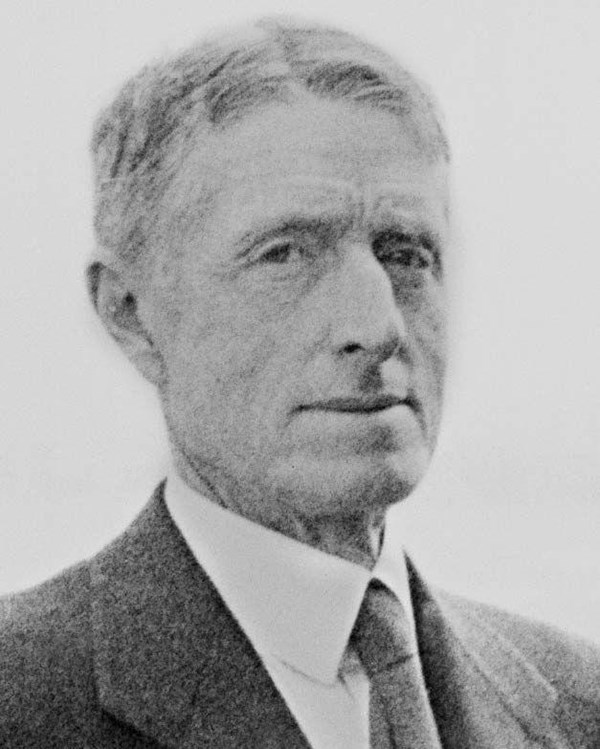
Arthur Asahel Shurcliff

Arthur Asahel Shurcliff (September 12, 1870–November 12, 1957; born Arthur Asahel Shurtleff) was an American landscape architect. After over 30 years of success as a practicing landscape architect and town planner, in 1928 he was called upon by John D. Rockefeller Jr., and the Boston architectural firm of Perry, Shaw & Hepburn to serve as Chief Landscape Architect for the restoration and recreation of the gardens, landscape, and town planning of Colonial Williamsburg, Virginia, a position he held until his retirement in 1941. It was the largest and most important commission of his career.

== Life and career ==
Arthur Asahel Shurtleff was born in Boston, Massachusetts, studied engineering at the Massachusetts Institute of Technology (1889–1894), and upon the advice of Charles Eliot and Frederick Law Olmsted, enrolled at Harvard University for studies in art history, surveying, horticulture and design. After his graduation in 1896, he joined the Olmsted, Olmsted and Eliot landscape architecture firm in Brookline. In 1899, he aided Frederick Law Olmsted Jr. in founding America's first four-year landscape architecture school at Harvard University. He set up his own Boston practice in 1904. The following year, 1905, he married Margaret Homer Nichols, with whom he had six children. An early member of the American Society of Landscape Architects he later served two terms as its president (1928–1932). In 1909 he submitted to the Massachusetts Metropolitan Improvements Commission a set of proposed plans for road improvements throughout the Boston metropolitan region. He proposed radial and circumferential connecting roadways to improve traffic, far ahead of its time.

In 1930, he changed his last name to Shurcliff in order, he said, to conform to the "ancient spelling of the family name".

In addition to the gardens, landscapes, and town planning of Colonial Williamsburg, his better known public works include the laying out of Old Sturbridge Village, the Charles River Esplanade, the redesign of Frederick Law Olmsted's Back Bay Fens and the zoological park at Franklin Park, all three in Boston. He served as a consultant to the Boston Parks Department, the Metropolitan District Commission and the Metropolitan Planning Board. More Boston works include the Paul Revere Mall (also called The Prado) in the North End, and the John Harvard Mall in Charlestown, both located along the Freedom Trail. Among numerous private commissions are included Carter's Grove and Wilton House Museum in Virginia, Greatwood Gardens at Goddard College, Plainfield, Vermont; Fuller Gardens in North Hampton, New Hampshire; the Wells brothers' estates at Sturbridge, Massachusetts (creators and funders of Old Sturbridge Village); the Brookview-Irvington Park, Lafayette Place, and Wildwood Park communities in Fort Wayne, Indiana; and the Richard Crane estate at Ipswich, Massachusetts.

== Personal life ==
His wife, Margaret Homer Shurcliff (née Nichols), was the sister of Rose Standish Nichols and great, great, great-granddaughter of Thomas Johnson. They married in 1905. They had six children: Sidney Nichols Shurcliff (1906–1981), who later joined his father's business, Sarah Parsons Shurcliff (died 2001, married Franz J. Ingelfinger), physicist William Shurcliff (1909–2006), inventor John Perkins Shurcliff (1911–1993), civic activist Elizabeth Homer Shurcliff (1913–2007) and economist Alice Warburton Shurcliff (1915–2000).

== See also ==
- Castle Hill (Ipswich, Massachusetts)
- Norman B. Leventhal Map Center
- Grelen

== Bibliography ==
Cushing, Elizabeth Hope. Arthur A. Shurcliff: Design, Preservation, and the Creation of the Colonial Williamsburg Landscape. 2014. Amherst, MA: Library of American Landscape History and University of Massachusetts Press.
