= Wildwood Park =

Wildwood Park may refer to:

- Wildwood Park (Pennsylvania), a public park in Harrisburg, Pennsylvania, United States
- Wildwood Park, Winnipeg, a suburban community in Winnipeg, Manitoba, Canada
- Wildwood Park Elementary, an elementary school in the Puyallup School District of Washington State, United States
- Wildwood Park for the Arts, a botanical garden and center for the arts in western Little Rock, Arkansas, United States
- Wildwood Park Historic District, a national historic district in Fort Wayne, Indiana, United States
- Wildwood Preserve Metropark, a nature reserve and historic estate located in Sylvania Township, Ohio, United States.
- Wildwood Regional Park, a suburban regional park situated in the western portion of Thousand Oaks, California, United States
- Wildwood Park, a park in the Wildwood neighborhood of Chicago, Illinois, United States
