= Lafayette Place Historic District =

Historic district in Indiana, United States

- U.S. National Register of Historic Places
- U.S. Historic district
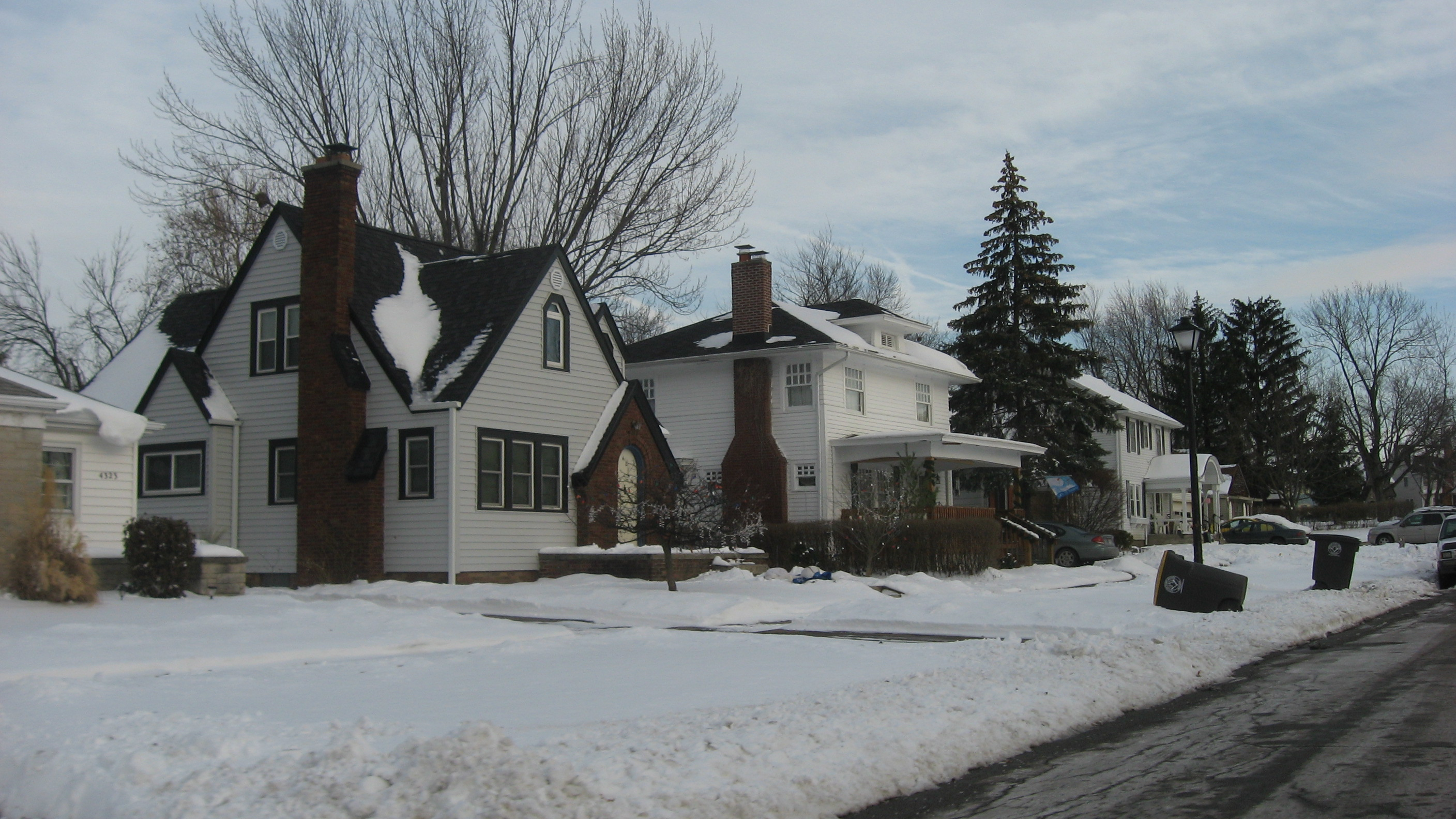
- Lafayette Place Historic District, January 2014

- Location within Indiana Location within the United States
- Location: Roughly bounded by S. Calhoun and Lafayette Sts., and McKinnie and Pettit Aves., Fort Wayne, Indiana
- Coordinates: 41°02′40″N 85°08′00″W
- Area: 86 acres (35 ha)
- Built: c. 1915-1963
- Architect: Shurcliff, Arthur; Ninde, Lee J.; et al.
- Architectural style: Tudor Revival, Colonial Revival, Bungalow / craftsman et al.
- MPS: Historic Residential Suburbs in the United States, 1820-1960 MPD
- NRHP reference No.: 12001147
- Added to NRHP: January 9, 2013

Lafayette Place Historic District is a national historic district located at Fort Wayne, Indiana. The district encompasses 582 contributing buildings, 1 contributing site, 1 contributing structure, and 1 contributing object in a predominantly residential section of Fort Wayne. The area was developed from about 1915 to 1963, and includes notable examples of Colonial Revival, Tudor Revival, and Bungalow / American Craftsman style residential architecture. The neighborhood was platted and designed by noted landscape architect Arthur Asahel Shurcliff.

It was listed on the National Register of Historic Places in 2013.
