= Walter Blair =

Walter Blair may refer to:

- Walter Blair (baseball) (1883–1948), American baseball player
- Walter Blair (folklorist) (1900–1992), American folklorist
- Walter Dabney Blair (1877–1953), American architect
- Walter Blair Jr. (1960–1993), American murderer
