= David Blair =

David Blair may refer to:

- David Blair (dancer) (1932–1975), British ballet dancer
- David Blair (director), British movie and television director
- David Blair (encyclopaedist) (1820–1899), Irish Australian journalist and encyclopaedist
- David Blair (filmmaker), American experimental filmmaker
- David Blair (golfer) (1917–1985), Scottish amateur golfer
- David Blair (information technologist) (1947–2011), information retrieval scientist
- David Blair (journalist) (born 1973), British journalist working for The Daily Telegraph
- David Blair (mariner) (1874–1955), British second officer, transferred off the Titanic
- David Blair (discus thrower) (born 1975), American Paralympic discus thrower
- David Blair (physicist) (born 1946), Australian physicist
- David Blair (rower) (born 1991), Canadian Paralympic rower and triathlete
- David Blair (rugby union) (born 1985), Scottish rugby player
- David Blair (moderator) (1637–1710), Scottish minister of the Church of Scotland
- David Blair (tennis) (born 1971), American tennis player
- Blair (poet) (David Blair, 1967–2011), American performance poet
- David H. Blair (1868–1945), commissioner of Internal Revenue of the United States, 1921–1929
- David Blair Motorsports, a former NASCAR racing team
- Rev. David Blair, a pen name of Eliza Fenwick (1767–1840)
