= Grelen =

Historic house in Virginia, United States

- U.S. National Register of Historic Places
- Virginia Landmarks Register
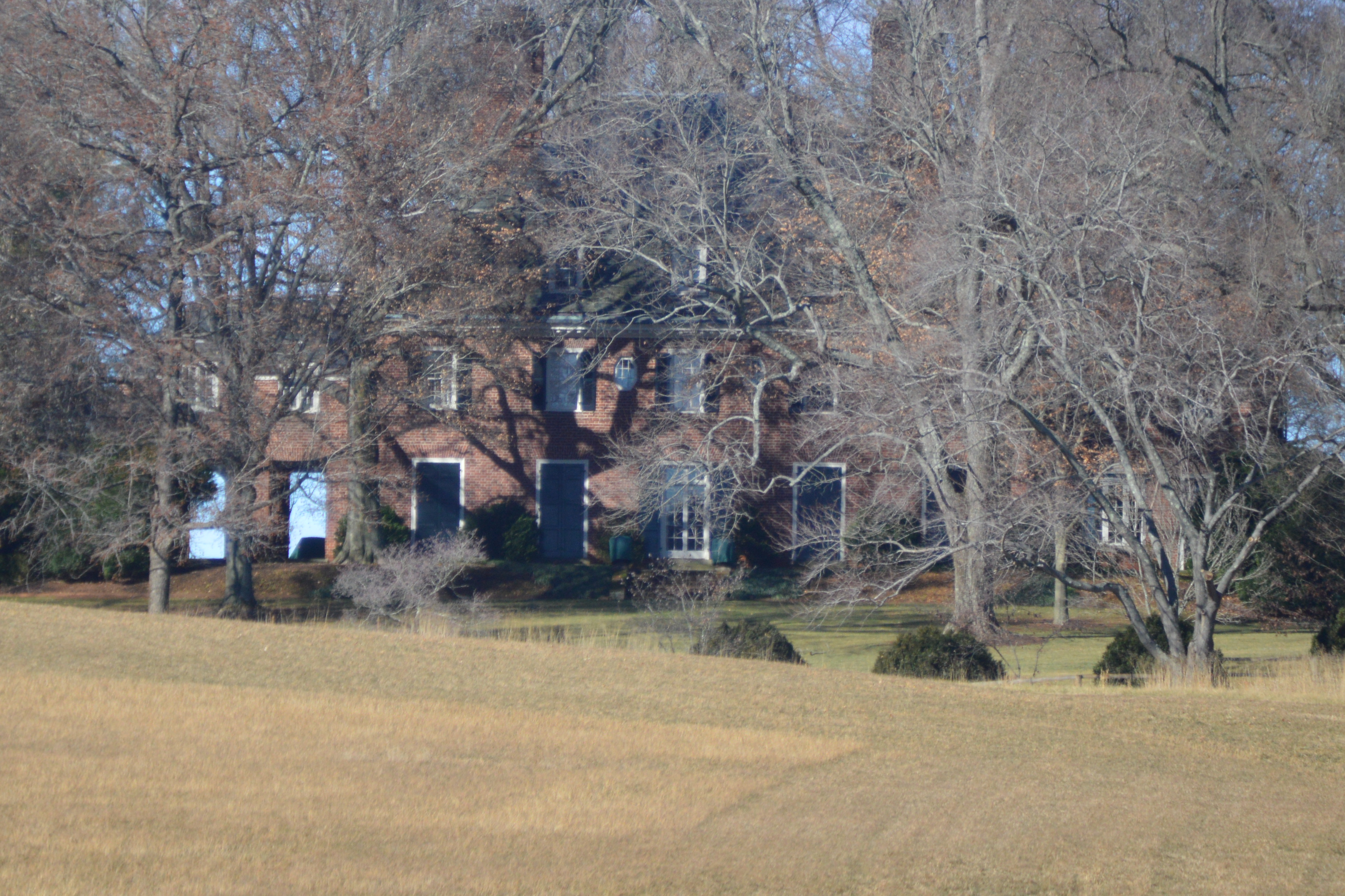
- Rear, facing Old Rapidan Road

- Location within Virginia Location within the United States
- Location: 15149 Grelen Dr., near Orange, Virginia
- Coordinates: 38°17′01″N 78°07′00″W
- Area: 418 acres (169 ha)
- Built: 1935-1936
- Architect: Walter Dabney Blair, et al.
- Architectural style: Georgian Revival
- NRHP reference No.: 98000049
- VLR No.: 068-0341

Significant dates
- Added to NRHP: February 13, 1998
- Designated VLR: July 2, 1997

Grelen is a historic home located near Orange, Orange County, Virginia. The main house was built in 1935–1936, and consists of a 2 1/2-story, five-bay, brick Georgian Revival style main block flanked by 1 1/2-story brick wings. The house is topped by a slate hipped roof and has a recessed centrally located six-panel front door surrounded by fluted pilasters. It features two massive interior brick chimneys with corbeled caps that rise above the roof of the main block of the house.

The house was designed by Walter Dabney Blair, whose other projects in Virginia included several buildings on the campus of the University of Virginia as well as the McIntire Public Library in Charlottesville. Grelen's gardens were designed by Arthur Asahel Shurcliff, chief landscape architect for Colonial Williamsburg. Grelen was listed on the National Register of Historic Places in 1998.
