= Brookview–Irvington Park Historic District =

Historic district in Indiana, United States

- U.S. National Register of Historic Places
- U.S. Historic district
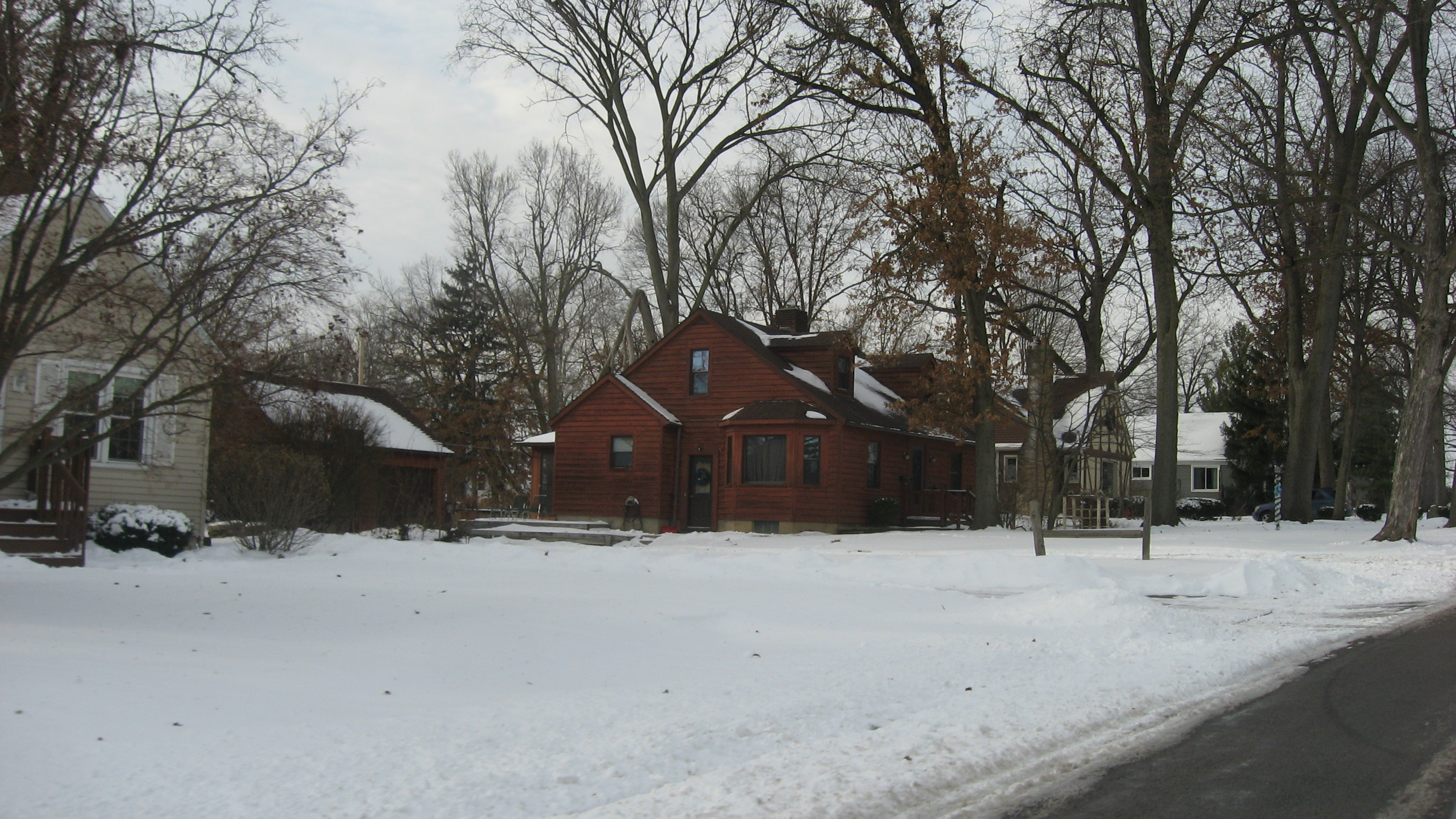
- Brookview–Irvington Park Historic District, January 2014

- Location within Indiana Location within the United States
- Location: Roughly bounded by Norfolk Ave. to the north, Lima Rd., Spy Run Ave. Extended, and N. Clinton St. to the east, Jacobs St. to the south, and the former Penn Central right-of-way to the west, Fort Wayne, Indiana
- Coordinates: 41°06′04″N 85°08′27″W
- Area: 160 acres (65 ha)
- Built: c. 1906-1965
- Architect: Shurcliff, Arthur; Ninde, Lee J.; Hillary, Walter Hoxie; et al.
- Architectural style: Tudor Revival, Colonial Revival, Bungalow / craftsman, Minimal Traditional, Ranch, et al.
- MPS: Park and Boulevard System of Fort Wayne, Indiana MPS
- NRHP reference No.: 11000121
- Added to NRHP: March 21, 2011

Brookview–Irvington Park Historic District is a national historic district located at Fort Wayne, Indiana. The district encompasses 423 contributing buildings and 1 contributing site in a predominantly residential section of Fort Wayne. The area was developed from about 1906 to 1965, and includes notable examples of Colonial Revival, Tudor Revival, and Bungalow / American Craftsman style residential architecture. A section of the neighborhood was platted and designed by noted landscape architect Arthur Asahel Shurcliff.

It was listed on the National Register of Historic Places in 2011.
