= Blair Lewis =

American gastroenterologist (born 1956)

- Born: November 23, 1956 (age 69); Hartford, Connecticut
- Known for: Capsule endoscopy
- Medical career
- Profession: Gastroenterology
- Institutions: Mount Sinai Medical Center; Mount Sinai School of Medicine

Blair S. Lewis, M.D., F.A.C.P., F.A.C.G., (born November 23, 1956, in Hartford, Connecticut) is an American board-certified gastroenterologist and Clinical Professor of Medicine at the Mount Sinai School of Medicine. Lewis is a specialist in the field of gastrointestinal endoscopy and was the primary investigator for the first clinical trial of capsule endoscopy for the small intestine and also the first clinical trial of capsule endoscopy for the colon.

== Biography ==
Lewis graduated from Dartmouth College in 1978 and earned his medical degree from Albert Einstein College of Medicine in 1982. He completed his residency in Internal Medicine at Montefiore Medical Center in 1985 and his fellowship in Gastroenterology at Mount Sinai Medical Center in 1987. Lewis was appointed Clinical Professor of Medicine in 2002 at Mount Sinai School of Medicine, where he continues to teach today.

He co-chairs the International Conference of Capsule Endoscopy and coordinated the Consensus Conference statements to guide capsule usage. He is past president of the New York Society for Gastrointestinal Endoscopy and New York Academy of Gastroenterology and has served on the board of the American College of Gastroenterology. Lewis has written scientific papers and has authored 3 books; all in the field of gastrointestinal endoscopy. He co-authored the technical document behind the American Gastroenterological Association's position statement concerning occult and obscure gastrointestinal bleeding and the ICCE consensus statement for clinical application of capsule endoscopy. He also helped develop a scoring index for inflammatory bowel disease seen on capsule endoscopy.

Lewis has published widely on gastroenterological research and co-authored multiple books including: Gastroenterology for the House Officer (1989), Flexible Sigmoidoscopy (1996), Gastrointestinal Endoscopy Clinics of North America; Enteroscopy (1999), and Capsule Endoscopy Simplified (2010). He also holds editorial positions at multiple medical journals including: Gastroenterology, Digestive Diseases and Sciences, American Journal of Gastroenterology, Gastrointestinal Endoscopy, Southern Medical Journal, Endoscopy, Journal of Clinical Gastroenterology, and The Medical Letter.

== Honors and awards ==
He is listed as one of the 75 Best Gastroenterologists in America in 2010, and also as one of the 125 Leading Gastroenterologists in 2011 by Becker's ASC Review. CastleConnolly.com names him in the Best Doctors of America and the Best 100 Doctors in Manhattan lists. He has also been listed as one of the top 5% of New York City doctors by SuperDoctors.com for the years 2008–2011. He has received the Patient's Choice Award for two successive years by PatientsChoice.org.

== Publications ==
1. Lewis, B; Waye, J (1987). "Total small bowel enteroscopy". Gastrointestinal Endoscopy. 33 (6): 435–8. doi:10.1016/S0016-5107(87)71682-4. PMID 3443262.
2. Waye, JD; Lewis, BS; Frankel, A; Geller, SA (1988). "Small colon polyps". The American Journal of Gastroenterology. 83 (2): 120–2. PMID 3341333.
3. Kelly, Kathleen M.; Lewis, Blair; Gentili, David R.; Benjamin, Ernest; Waye, Jerome D.; Iberti, Thomas J. (1988). "Use of percutaneous gastrostomy in the intensive care patient". Critical Care Medicine. 16 (1): 62–3. doi:10.1097/00003246-198801000-00013. PMID 3123141.
4. Lewis, BS; Waye, JD (1988). "Chronic gastrointestinal bleeding of obscure origin: Role of small bowel enteroscopy". Gastroenterology. 94 (5 Pt 1): 1117–20. doi:10.1016/0016-5085(88)90001-7. PMID 3258259.
5. Lewis, BS; Waye, JD (1988). "Small bowel enteroscopy in 1988: Pros and cons". The American Journal of Gastroenterology. 83 (8): 799–802. PMID 3293429.
6. Waye, JD; Lewis, BS (1988). "Gastrointestinal bleeding: the small bowel, a diagnostic approach". Ital J Gastroenterol. 20: 74–7.
7. Lewis, BS; Waye, JD; Khilnani, MT; Biller, HF (1988). "Fibrovascular polyp of the esophagus". The Mount Sinai Journal of Medicine, New York. 55 (4): 324–5. PMID 3266303.
8. Waye, J. D.; Lewis, B. S.; Atchison, M. A.; Talbott, M. (1988). "The lost polyp: A guide to retrieval during colonoscopy". International Journal of Colorectal Disease. 3 (4): 229–31. doi:10.1007/BF01660721. PMID 3198994. S2CID 7838007.
9. Lewis, B; Shlien, R; Waye, J; Knight, R; Aldoroty, R (1989). "Diazepam versus midazolam (versed) in outpatient colonoscopy: A double-blind randomized study☆". Gastrointestinal Endoscopy. 35 (1): 33–6. doi:10.1016/S0016-5107(89)72682-1. PMID 2920882.
10. MacDermott, RP; Nash, GS; Auer, IO; Shlien, R; Lewis, BS; Madassery, J; Nahm, MH (1989). "Alterations in serum immunoglobulin G subclasses in patients with ulcerative colitis and Crohn's disease". Gastroenterology. 96 (3): 764–8. doi:10.1016/0016-5085(89)90899-8. PMID 2914639.
11. Mauer, K.; Waye, J. D.; Lewis, B. S.; Szporn, A. H. (2008). "The Hairy Polyp: A Benign Teratoma of the Colon". Endoscopy. 21 (3): 148–51. doi:10.1055/s-2007-1012926. PMID 2743946.
12. Lewis, B; Mauer, K; Bush, A (1990). "The rapid placement of jejunal feeding tubes: The Setdinger technique applied to the gut". Gastrointestinal Endoscopy. 36 (2): 139–41. doi:10.1016/S0016-5107(90)70969-8. PMID 2110541.
13. Lewis, BS; Kornbluth, A (1990). "Hormonal therapy for bleeding from angiodysplasia: Chronic renal failure, et al??". The American Journal of Gastroenterology. 85 (12): 1649–51. PMID 2252035.
14. Biener, A; Palestro, C; Lewis, BS; Katz, LB (1990). "Intraoperative scintigraphy for active small intestinal bleeding". Surgery, Gynecology & Obstetrics. 171 (5): 388–92. PMID 2237722.
15. O'Brien, MJ; Winawer, SJ; Zauber, AG; Gottlieb, LS; Sternberg, SS; Diaz, B; Dickersin, GR; Ewing, S; et al. (1990). "The National Polyp Study. Patient and polyp characteristics associated with high-grade dysplasia in colorectal adenomas". Gastroenterology. 98 (2): 371–9. doi:10.1016/0016-5085(90)90827-N. PMID 2403953.
16. Waye, J; Yessayan, S; Lewis, B; Fabry, T (1991). "The technique of abdominal pressure in total colonoscopy". Gastrointestinal Endoscopy. 37 (2): 147–51. doi:10.1016/S0016-5107(91)70673-1. PMID 2032597.
17. Lewis, BS; Wenger, JS; Waye, JD (1991). "Small bowel enteroscopy and intraoperative enteroscopy for obscure gastrointestinal bleeding". The American Journal of Gastroenterology. 86 (2): 171–4. PMID 1992630.
18. Lewis, B S; Kornbluth, A; Waye, J D (1991). "Small bowel tumours: Yield of enteroscopy". Gut. 32 (7): 763–5. doi:10.1136/gut.32.7.763. PMC 1378992. PMID 1855682.
19. Aisenberg, J; Cohen, L; Lewis, B (1991). "Marked endoscopic gastrostomy tubes permit one-pass Ponsky technique". Gastrointestinal Endoscopy. 37 (5): 552–3. doi:10.1016/S0016-5107(91)70828-6. PMID 1936835.
20. Barkin, J; Lewis, B; Reiner, D; Waye, J; Goldberg, R; Phillips, R (1992). "Diagnostic and therapeutic jejunoscopy with a new, longer enteroscope". Gastrointestinal Endoscopy. 38 (1): 55–8. doi:10.1016/S0016-5107(92)70333-2. PMID 1612382.
21. Lewis, Blair S.; Salomon, Peter; Rivera-Macmurray, Suzette; Kornbluth, Asher A.; Wenger, Jeffrey; Waye, Jerome D. (1992). "Does Hormonal Therapy Have Any Benefit for Bleeding Angiodysplasia?". Journal of Clinical Gastroenterology. 15 (2): 99–103. doi:10.1097/00004836-199209000-00004. PMID 1328358.
22. Szold, Amir; Katz, Lester B.; Lewis, Blair S. (1992). "Surgical approach to occult gastrointestinal bleeding". The American Journal of Surgery. 163 (1): 90–2, discussion 92–3. doi:10.1016/0002-9610(92)90258-S. PMID 1733379.
23. Rex, D; Lewis, B; Waye, J (1992). "Colonoscopy and endoscopic therapy for delayed post-polypectomy hemorrhage". Gastrointestinal Endoscopy. 38 (2): 127–9. doi:10.1016/S0016-5107(92)70376-9. PMID 1568607.
24. Waye, Jerome D.; Lewis, Blair S.; Yessayan, Siroun (1992). "Colonoscopy". Journal of Clinical Gastroenterology. 15 (4): 347–51. doi:10.1097/00004836-199212000-00018. PMID 1294644.
25. Berner, JS; Mauer, K; Lewis, BS (1994). "Push and sonde enteroscopy for the diagnosis of obscure gastrointestinal bleeding". The American Journal of Gastroenterology. 89 (12): 2139–42. PMID 7977229.
26. Askin, M; Lewis, B (1996). "Push enteroscopic cauterization: Long-term follow-up of 83 patients with bleeding small intestinal angiodysplasia". Gastrointestinal Endoscopy. 43 (6): 580–3. doi:10.1016/S0016-5107(96)70195-5. PMID 8781937.
27. Heimann, Tomas M.; Greenstein, Adrian J.; Lewis, Blair; Kaufman, Dan; Heimann, David M.; Aufses, Arthur H. (1998). "Comparison of Primary and Reoperative Surgery in Patients with Crohns Disease". Annals of Surgery. 227 (4): 492–5. doi:10.1097/00000658-199804000-00007. PMC 1191302. PMID 9563535.
28. Geller, Alex; Clain, Jonathan E.; Lewis, Blair S.; Gostout, Christopher J. (1998). "Enteroliths in a Kock continent ileostomy: Endoscopic diagnosis and management". Gastrointestinal Endoscopy. 48 (3): 306–8. doi:10.1016/S0016-5107(98)70198-1. PMID 9744612.
29. Zuckerman, Gary R.; Prakash, Chandra; Askin, Matthew P.; Lewis, Blair S. (2000). "AGA technical review on the evaluation and management of occult and obscure gastrointestinal bleeding". Gastroenterology. 118 (1): 201–21. doi:10.1016/S0016-5085(00)70430-6. PMID 10611170.
30. Lewis, Blair S.; Swain, Paul (2002). "Capsule endoscopy in the evaluation of patients with suspected small intestinal bleeding: Results of a pilot study☆". Gastrointestinal Endoscopy. 56 (3): 349–53. doi:10.1016/S0016-5107(02)70037-0. PMID 12196771.
31. Goldfarb, Neil I.; Phillips, Amy; Conn, Mitchell; Lewis, Blair S.; Nash, David B. (2002). "Economic and Health Outcomes of Capsule Endoscopy: Opportunities for Improved Management of the Diagnostic Process for Obscure Gastrointestinal Bleeding". Disease Management. 5 (3): 123–35. doi:10.1089/109350702760301411.
32. Lewis, B.; Goldfarb, N. (2003). "The advent of capsule endoscopy - a not-so-futuristic approach to obscure gastrointestinal bleeding". Alimentary Pharmacology & Therapeutics. 17 (9): 1085–96. doi:10.1046/j.1365-2036.2003.01556.x. PMID 12752345.
33. Goldfarb, Neil I.; Pizzi, Laura T.; Fuhr, Joseph P.; Salvador, Christopher; Sikirica, Vanja; Kornbluth, Asher; Lewis, Blair (2004). "Diagnosing Crohn's Disease: An Economic Analysis Comparing Wireless Capsule Endoscopy with Traditional Diagnostic Procedures". Disease Management. 7 (4): 292–304. doi:10.1089/dis.2004.7.292. PMID 15671786.
34. Goldstein, Jay L.; Eisen, Glenn M.; Lewis, Blair; Gralnek, Ian M.; Zlotnick, Steve; Fort, John G. (2005). "Video capsule endoscopy to prospectively assess small bowel injury with celecoxib, naproxen plus omeprazole, and placebo". Clinical Gastroenterology and Hepatology. 3 (2): 133–41. doi:10.1016/S1542-3565(04)00619-6. PMID 15704047.
35. Lewis, B. S.; Eisen, G. M.; Friedman, S. (2005). "A Pooled Analysis to Evaluate Results of Capsule Endoscopy Trials". Endoscopy. 37 (10): 960–5. doi:10.1055/s-2005-870353. PMID 16189768.
36. Eliakim, Rami; Sharma, Virender K; Yassin, Kamel; Adler, Samuel N; Jacob, Harold; Cave, David R; Sachdev, Ritu; Mitty, Roger D; et al. (2005). "A Prospective Study of the Diagnostic Accuracy of PillCam ESO Esophageal Capsule Endoscopy Versus Conventional Upper Endoscopy in Patients with Chronic Gastroesophageal Reflux Diseases". Journal of Clinical Gastroenterology. 39 (7): 572–8. doi:10.1097/01.mcg.0000170764.29202.24. PMID 16000923. S2CID 21593231.
37. Cobrin, Gena M.; Pittman, Robert H.; Lewis, Blair S. (2006). "Increased diagnostic yield of small bowel tumors with capsule endoscopy". Cancer. 107 (1): 22–7. doi:10.1002/cncr.21975. PMID 16736516.
38. Cheifetz, Adam S.; Kornbluth, Asher A.; Legnani, Peter; Schmelkin, Ira; Brown, Alphonso; Lichtiger, Simon; Lewis, Blair S. (2006). "The Risk of Retention of the Capsule Endoscope in Patients with Known or Suspected Crohn's Disease". The American Journal of Gastroenterology. 101 (10): 2218–22. doi:10.1111/j.1572-0241.2006.00761.x. PMID 16848804. S2CID 1802463.
39. Cheifetz, Adam S.; Lewis, Blair S. (2006). "Capsule Endoscopy Retention: Is it a Complication?". Journal of Clinical Gastroenterology. 40 (8): 688–91. doi:10.1097/00004836-200609000-00005. PMID 16940879. S2CID 26367946.
40. Gralnek, I. M.; Defranchis, R.; Seidman, E.; Leighton, J. A.; Legnani, P.; Lewis, B. S. (2007). "Development of a capsule endoscopy scoring index for small bowel mucosal inflammatory change". Alimentary Pharmacology & Therapeutics. 27 (2): 146–54. doi:10.1111/j.1365-2036.2007.03556.x. PMID 17956598. S2CID 39324497.
41. Lewis, Blair S. (2007). "Obscure GI bleeding in the world of capsule endoscopy, push, and double balloon enteroscopies". Gastrointestinal Endoscopy. 66 (3): S66–8. doi:10.1016/j.gie.2007.01.015. PMID 17709036.
42. Mergener, K.; Ponchon, T.; Gralnek, I.; Pennazio, M.; Gay, G.; Selby, W.; Seidman, E.; Cellier, C.; et al. (2007). "Literature review and recommendations for clinical application of small-bowel capsule endoscopy, based on a panel discussion by international experts". Endoscopy. 39 (10): 895–909. doi:10.1055/s-2007-966930. PMID 17968807.
43. Raju, Gottumukkala S.; Gerson, Lauren; Das, Ananya; Lewis, Blair; American Gastroenterological Association (2007). "American Gastroenterological Association (AGA) Institute Technical Review on Obscure Gastrointestinal Bleeding". Gastroenterology. 133 (5): 1697–717. doi:10.1053/j.gastro.2007.06.007. PMID 17983812.
44. Raju, Gottumukkala S.; Gerson, Lauren; Das, Ananya; Lewis, Blair; American Gastroenterological Association (2007). "American Gastroenterological Association (AGA) Institute Medical Position Statement on Obscure Gastrointestinal Bleeding". Gastroenterology. 133 (5): 1694–6. doi:10.1053/j.gastro.2007.06.008. PMID 17983811.
