= Wilton House Museum =

Historic house in Virginia, United States

- Wilton
- U.S. National Register of Historic Places
- Virginia Landmarks Register
- Richmond City Historic District
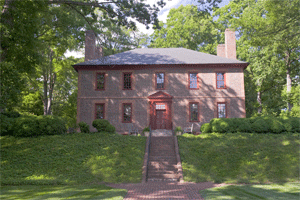

- Location within Virginia Location within the United States
- Location: S of Richmond, on N bank of James River, Richmond, Virginia
- Coordinates: 37°33′45″N 77°31′14″W
- Area: 2 acres (0.81 ha)
- Built: 1750
- Architectural style: Georgian
- NRHP reference No.: 76002231
- VLR No.: 127-0141

Significant dates
- Added to NRHP: April 30, 1976
- Designated VLR: October 21, 1975

Wilton House Museum is a museum in a historic house located in Richmond, Virginia. Wilton was constructed c. 1753 by William Randolph III, son of William Randolph II, of Turkey Island. Wilton was originally the manor house on a 2,000-acre (8.1 km^{2}) tobacco plantation known as "World's End" located on the north bank of the James River several miles east of the city of Richmond. Between 1747 and 1759, William III acquired more than a dozen contiguous tracts of land. About 1753, Randolph completed building a Georgian manor house, which he named "Wilton," on a site overlooking the river.

In 1934, with commercial development encroaching on the opposite bank of the James and the property in danger of foreclosure, The National Society of The Colonial Dames of America in the Commonwealth of Virginia saved the mansion from destruction by purchasing, dismantling, moving, and rebuilding it on a site overlooking the James River a few miles west of its original location. Ironically the farm just east of the Pocahontas Parkway, where Wilton once stood remains devoted to agriculture in the 21st century.

Open to the public since 1952, Wilton hosts a collection of 18th- and 19th-century furnishings, textiles, glass, ceramics, and silver that reflect the wealthy planter life of the mid-18th century.

The house was listed on the National Register of Historic Places in 1976.

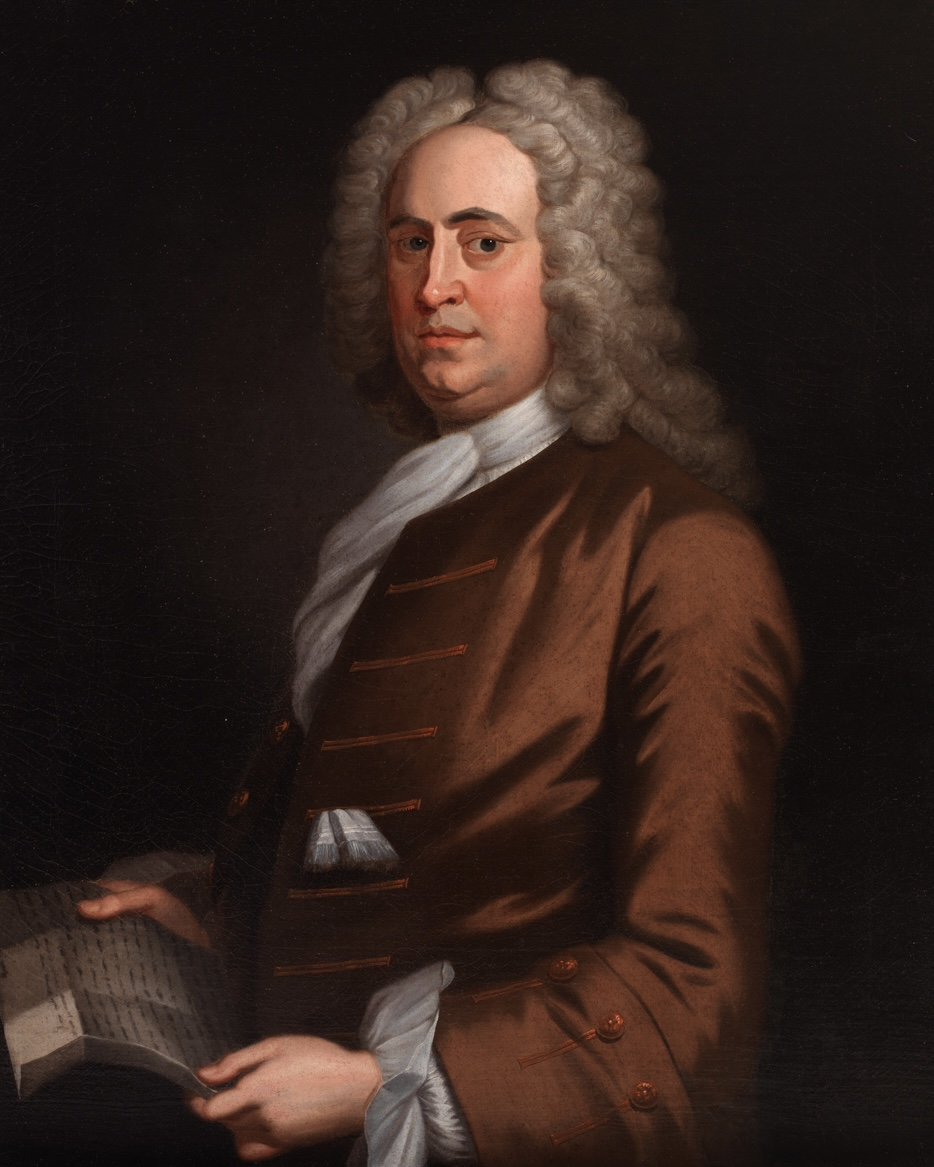
William Randolph II

== Architectural style ==
Wilton is built in the Georgian style of architecture, which was the prevailing style during the Colonial era in New England and the Southern colonies. Colonial Georgian architecture differed slightly from region to region, depending on climate and locally available building materials, but generally followed a symmetrical, rectangular plan with simple, dignified lines ultimately deriving from Palladian architecture.

== History of the house ==
=== Randolph family ===
During the 17th century the Randolph family of Virginia was among the wealthiest and most powerful families in Colonial Virginia. William Randolph and his wife, Mary Isham Randolph, have been referred to as "the Adam and Eve of Virginia," whose many distinguished descendants included President Thomas Jefferson, Chief Justice John Marshall, and General Robert E. Lee. Wilton was constructed circa 1753 for William III and his wife, Anne Harrison Randolph, on a 2,000-acre plantation overlooking the James River. William Randolph III was a planter and public servant: a member of the House of Burgesses for Henrico County, an officer in the militia, and a vestryman for Henrico Parish.

Wilton was constructed for William Randolph III and Anne Randolph between circa 1753; their son Peyton Randolph (d. 1784) was the second owner, and after Peyton the house descended through several generations of Randolphs until 1859. Wilton survived the Civil War and changed owners another four times before going into foreclosure by The Bank of Commerce and Trust during the depth of the Great Depression. When the house was in danger of demolition The National Society of The Colonial Dames of America in the Commonwealth of Virginia intervened and became the last owners of the house.

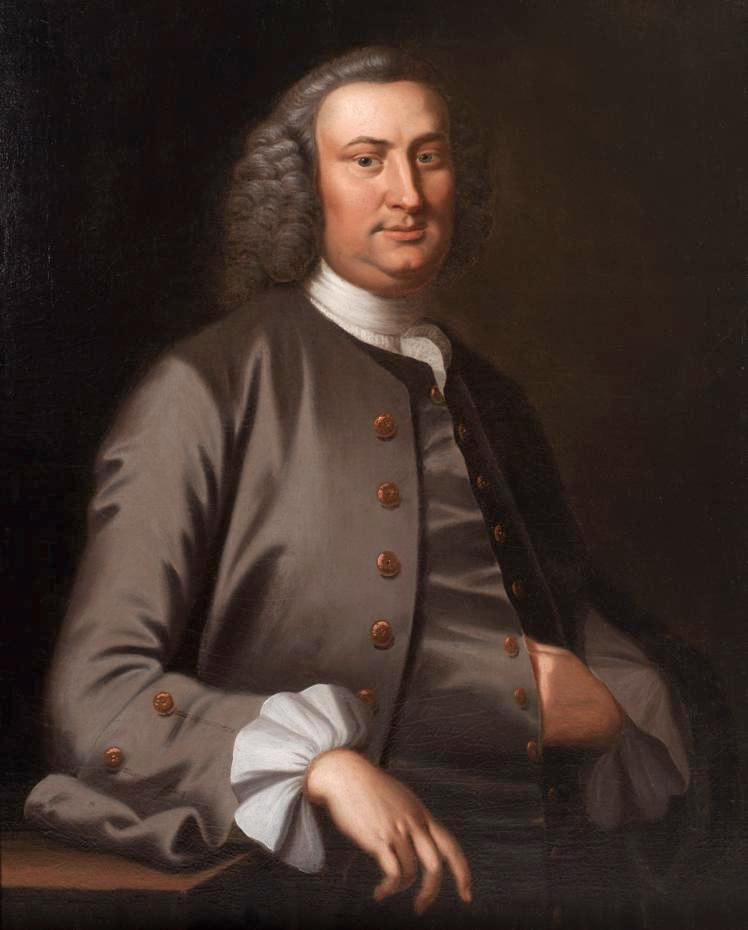
William Randolph III

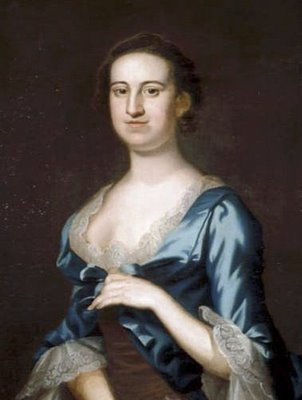
Anne H. Randolph

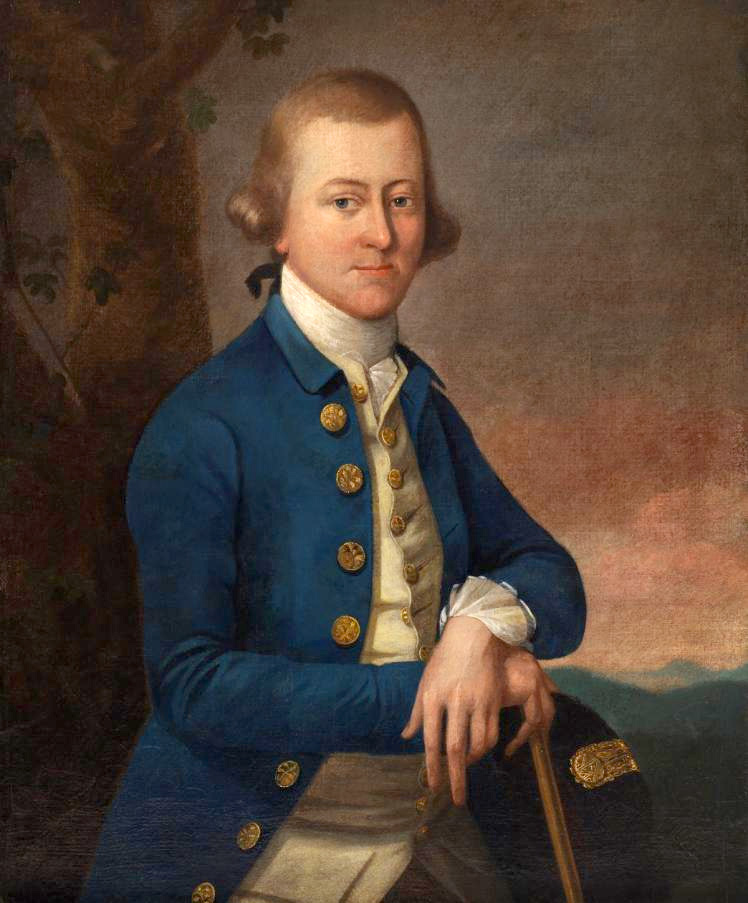
Peyton Randolph of Wilton

William Randolph IV

At Wilton, the Randolphs enslaved over 100 African American men, women, and children and utilized slave labor to build both the house and produce their ongoing income in the form of wheat and tobacco. By the early 19th century, Wilton was home to the largest enslaved community in Henrico County.

- William Randolph III died in the year of 1762, aged 52, and left Wilton to his twenty-three-year-old son, Peyton Randolph.
- Peyton Randolph died in the year of 1784 at age 46 and left Wilton to his five-year-old son, William Randolph IV.
- William Randolph died in the year of 1815 at age 26 and left Wilton to his five-year-old son, Robert Randolph. His widow, Anne Andrews Randolph, managed the plantation while raising the next heir.
- Robert Randolph died in 1839 at age 29 and left a heavily indebted Wilton to his four-year-old daughter, Catherine (Kate).
- Catherine was the last owner in the Randolph family; she filed a suit to sell Wilton in 1859.

=== 18th century ===
Wilton was originally located on a 2,000-acre tobacco plantation approximately 9 miles downriver from Richmond, the large two-story brick house is one of the most significant of the James River plantation mansions.

- In 1742 William III inherited his father's Fighting Creek land.
- 1747-William III purchased tracts of land which was over 1000 acres from William Finney Jr.
- 1747-350 acres from Richard Randolph (Thomas Bayley, William Harding)
- 1747-150 acres from William Bayley
- 1749-136 acres from Arthur Giles
- 1752- 25 acres was "adjacent to the land of Randolph whereon he now lives called Wilton"
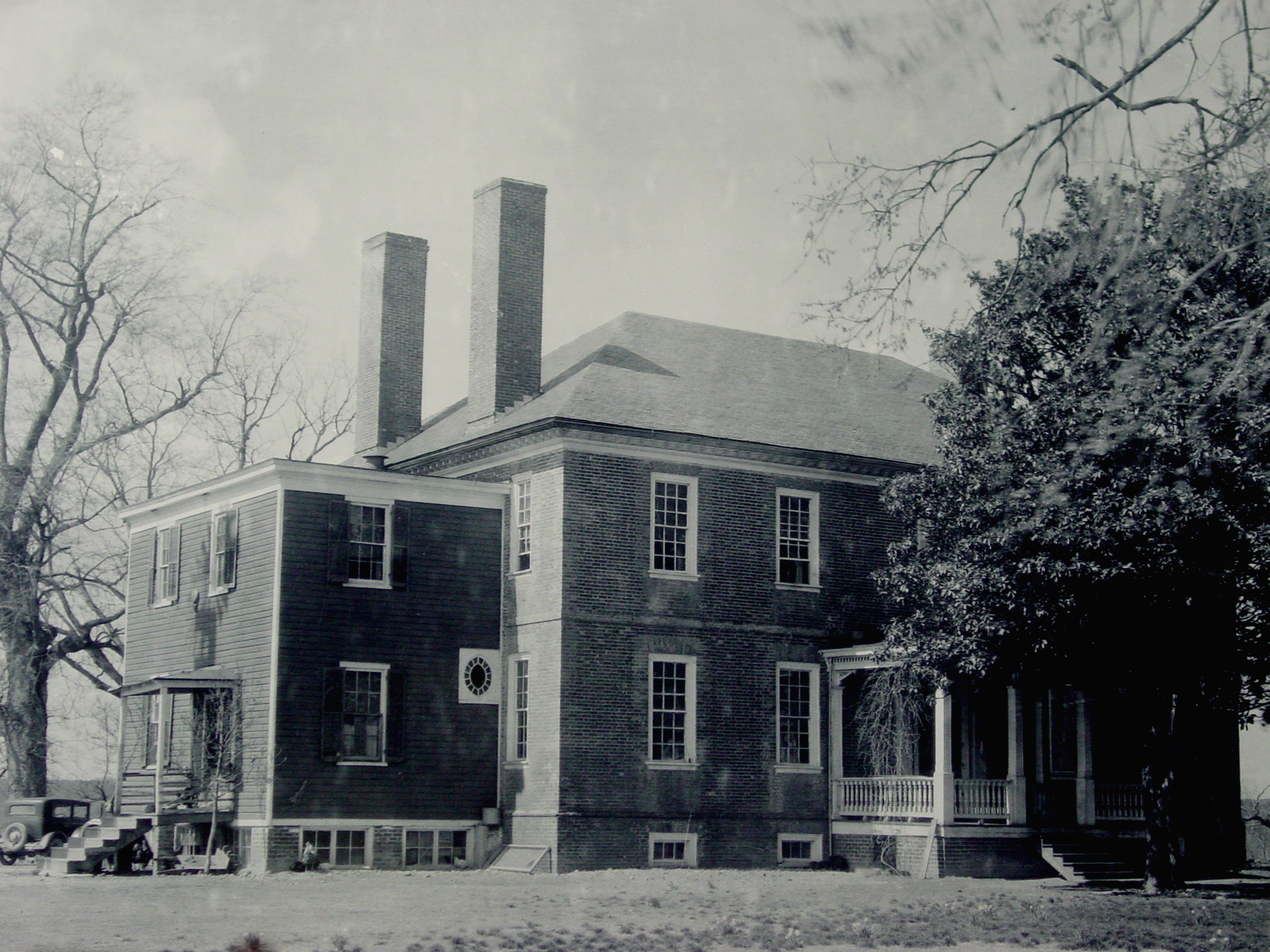
  Original Land Side. c. 1910s
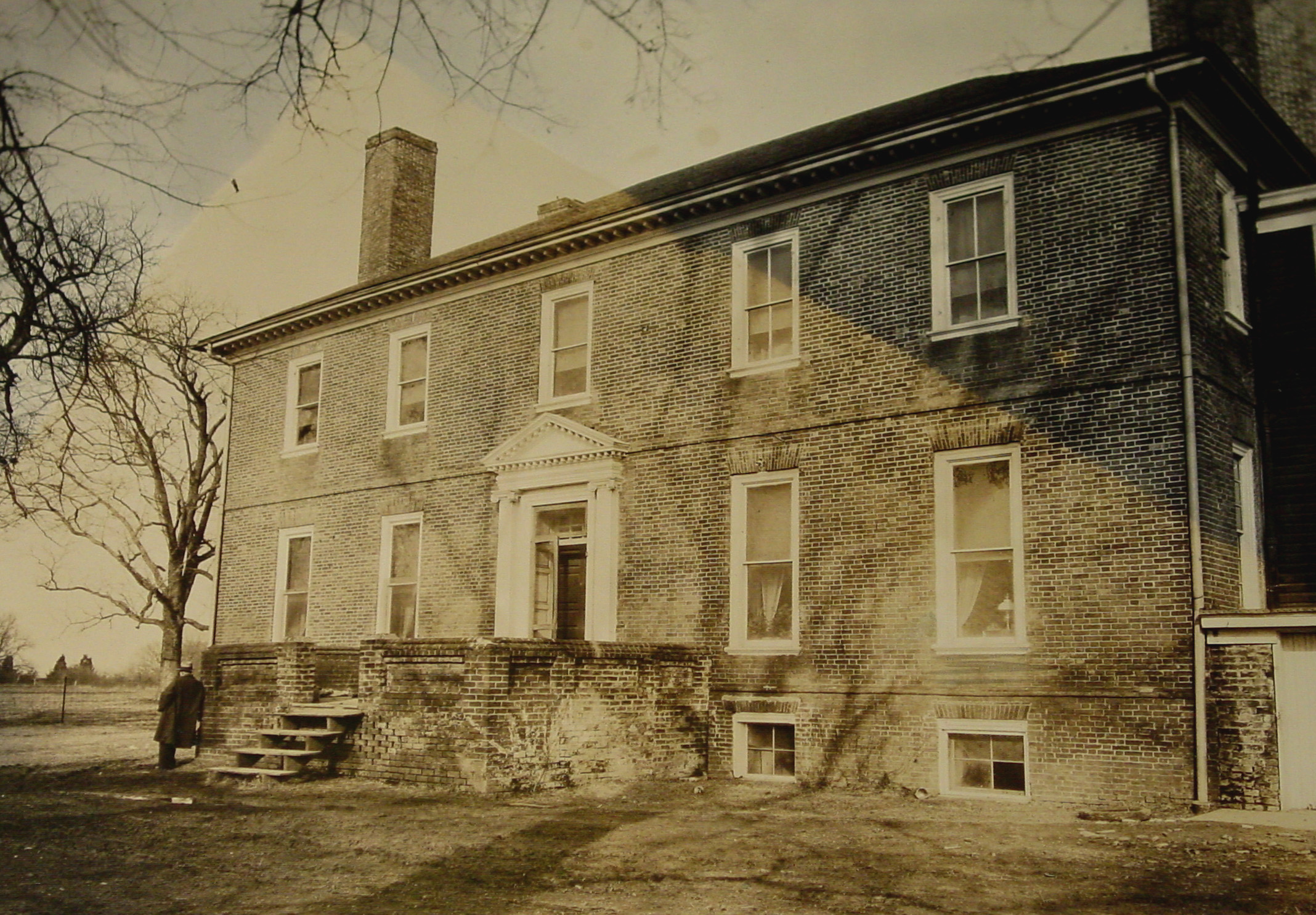
  Original River Side. c.1910s
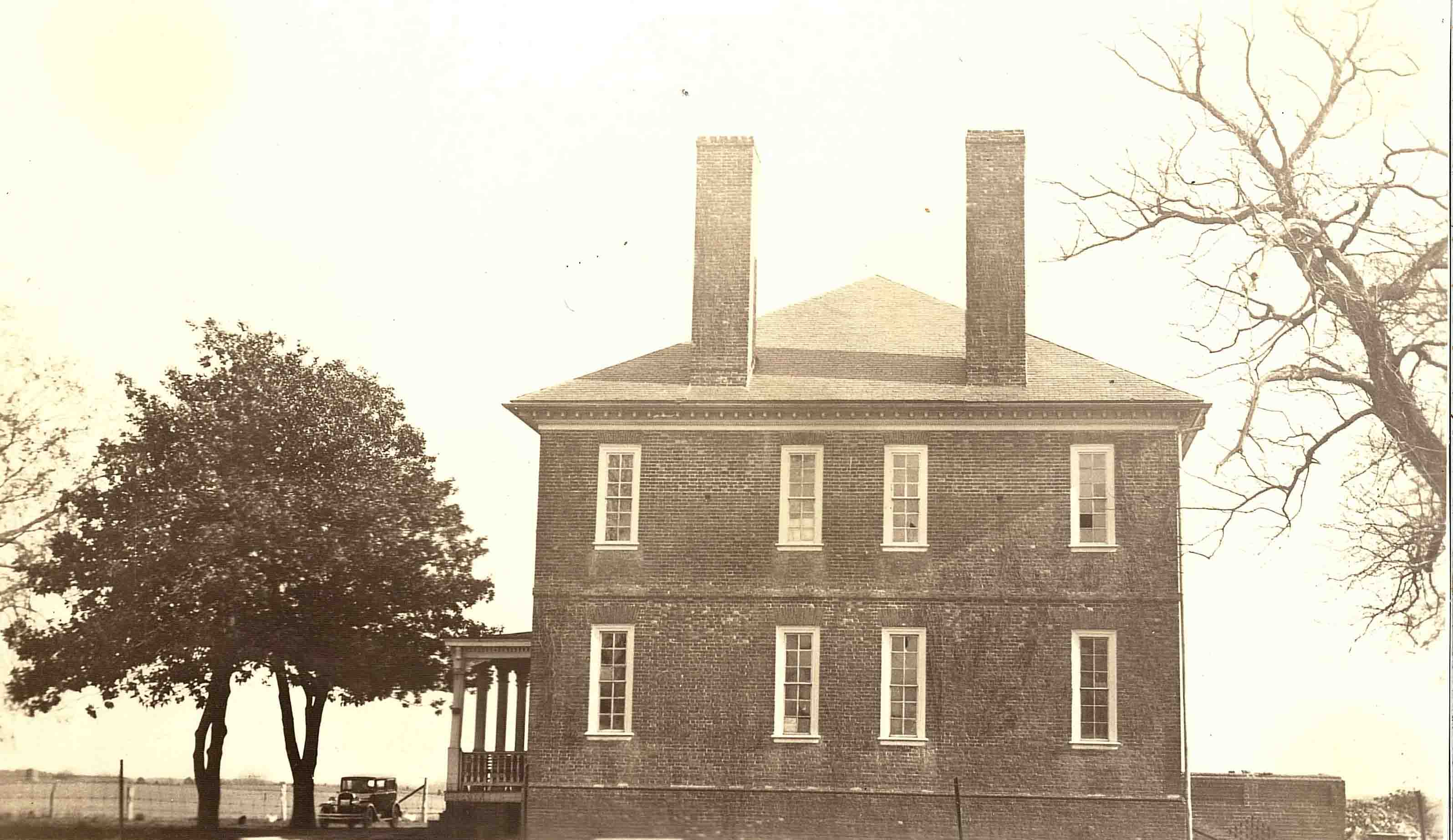
  Original West Side. c.1910s
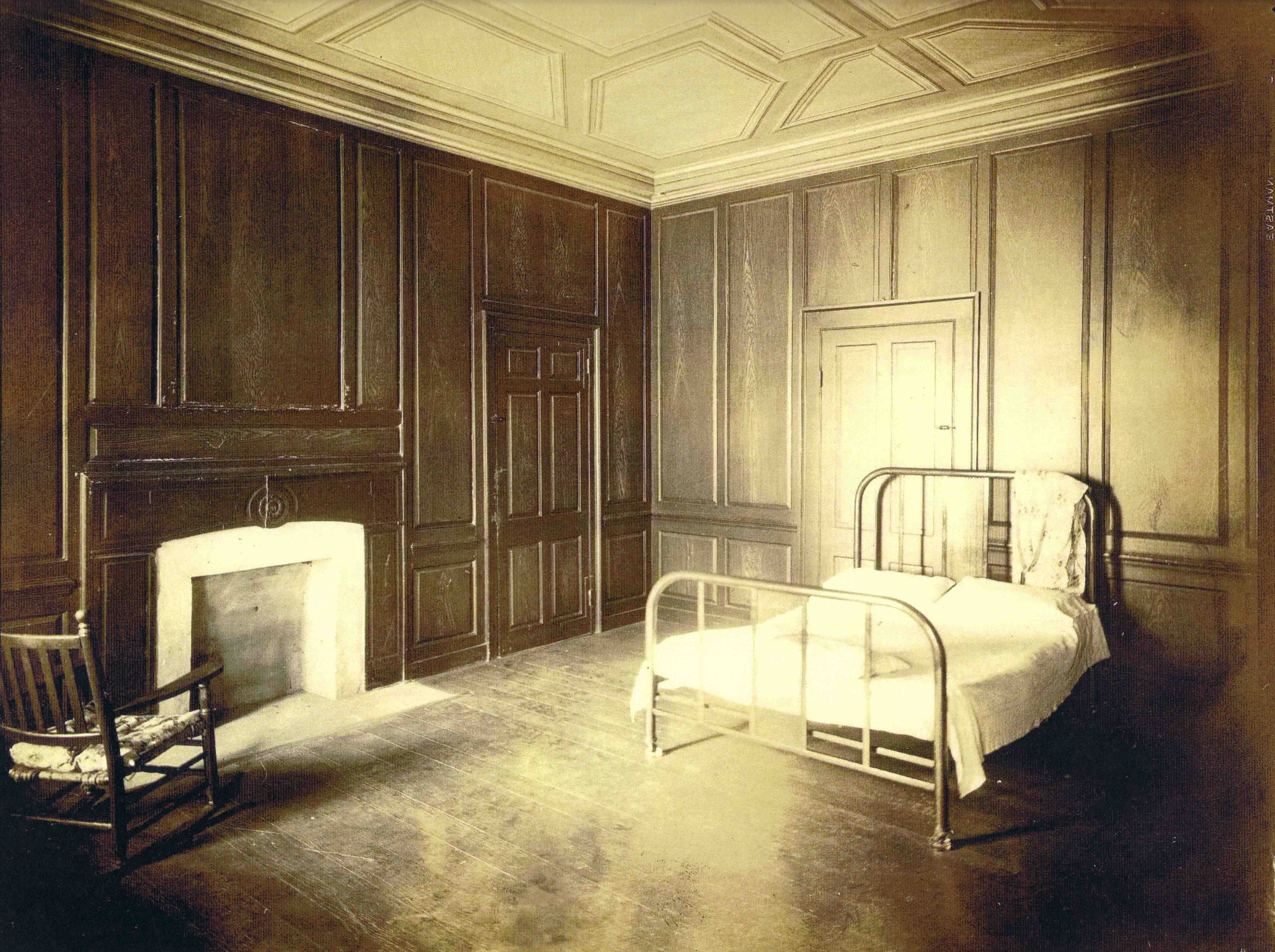
  Original Northeast Chamber. c.1910s
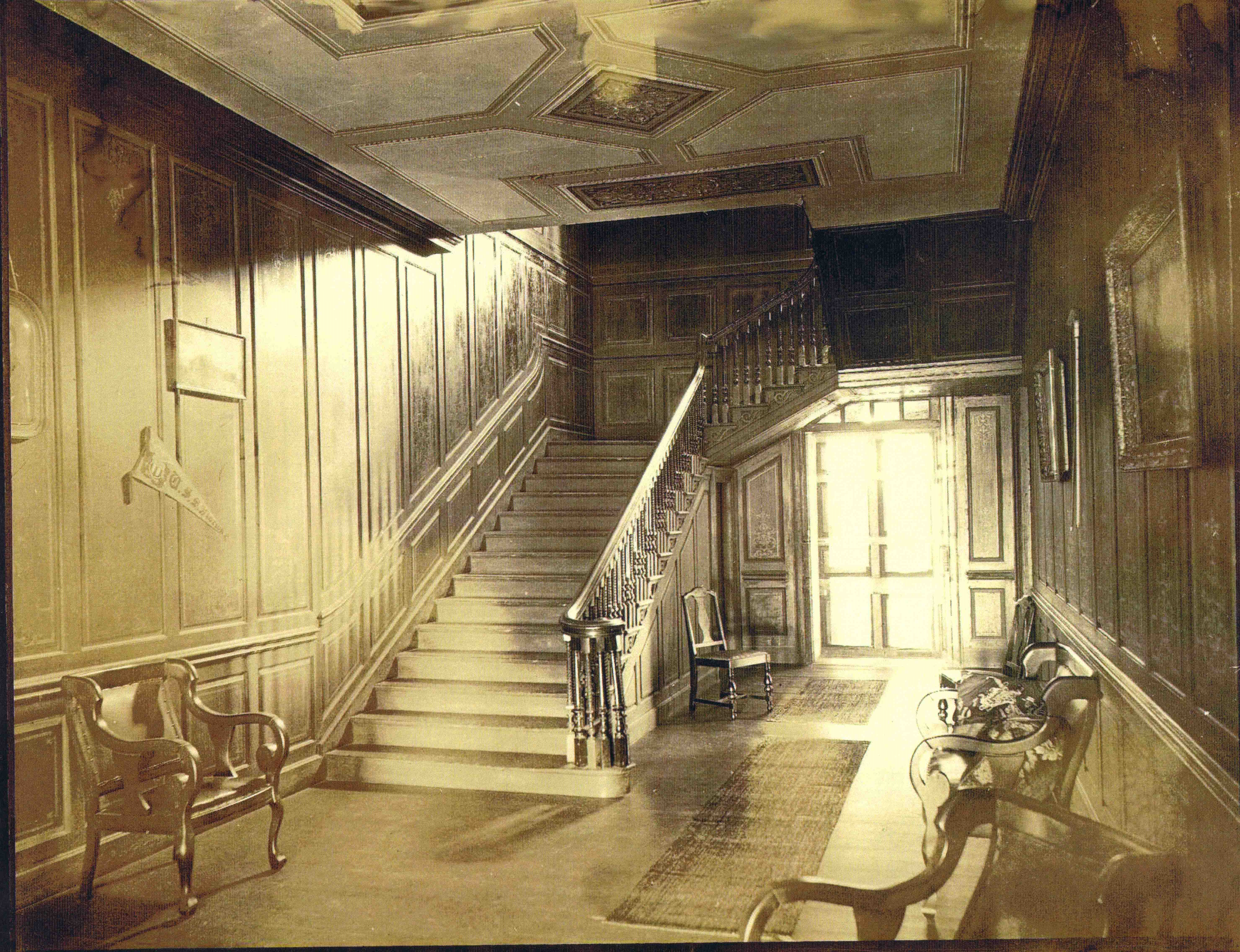
  Original Lower Passage. c.1910s

=== 19th century ===
In his will, William Randolph IV had given his wife "compleat power at any time to dispose of any part of my property that she may think proper for the payment of my debts". In 1833, the writer Catharine Sedgwick visited Wilton and described "Broken down fences, a falling piazza, defaced paint, banisters ties up with ropes, etc." and added that "the general aspect of the house is that of a forlorn ruin". The total value of the Wilton estate as reflected in the land tax books fell from $74,664 in 1832 to $45,066 in 1850. Wilton continued to decline.

In 1833 and 1835, Robert Randolph was forced to place the plantation in trust to secure ever larger debts. Robert Randolph died in 1839, leaving a heavily indebted Wilton to his daughter, Catherine. Four years after Robert's death, his widow, Mary, married James Brook of New York. In 1846, James and Mary filed suit against the estate of their daughter, Catherine S. Randolph, to facilitate a division of the property. Wilton was divided into 744 acres belong to James and Mary, and 1,535 acres belong to Catherine.

In 1859, Catherine filed a suit to sell Wilton. The suit was not settled until 1875. The depositions of the land condition indicate that soil fertility on the plantation had been reduced due to hard cultivation over the years by owners and tenants. The buildings were dilapidated and worthless. The auction was held on July 27, 1859: William C. Knight paid $49,517 for 1,237.93 acres, including the house. Catherine was the last owner of Wilton from the Randolph family.

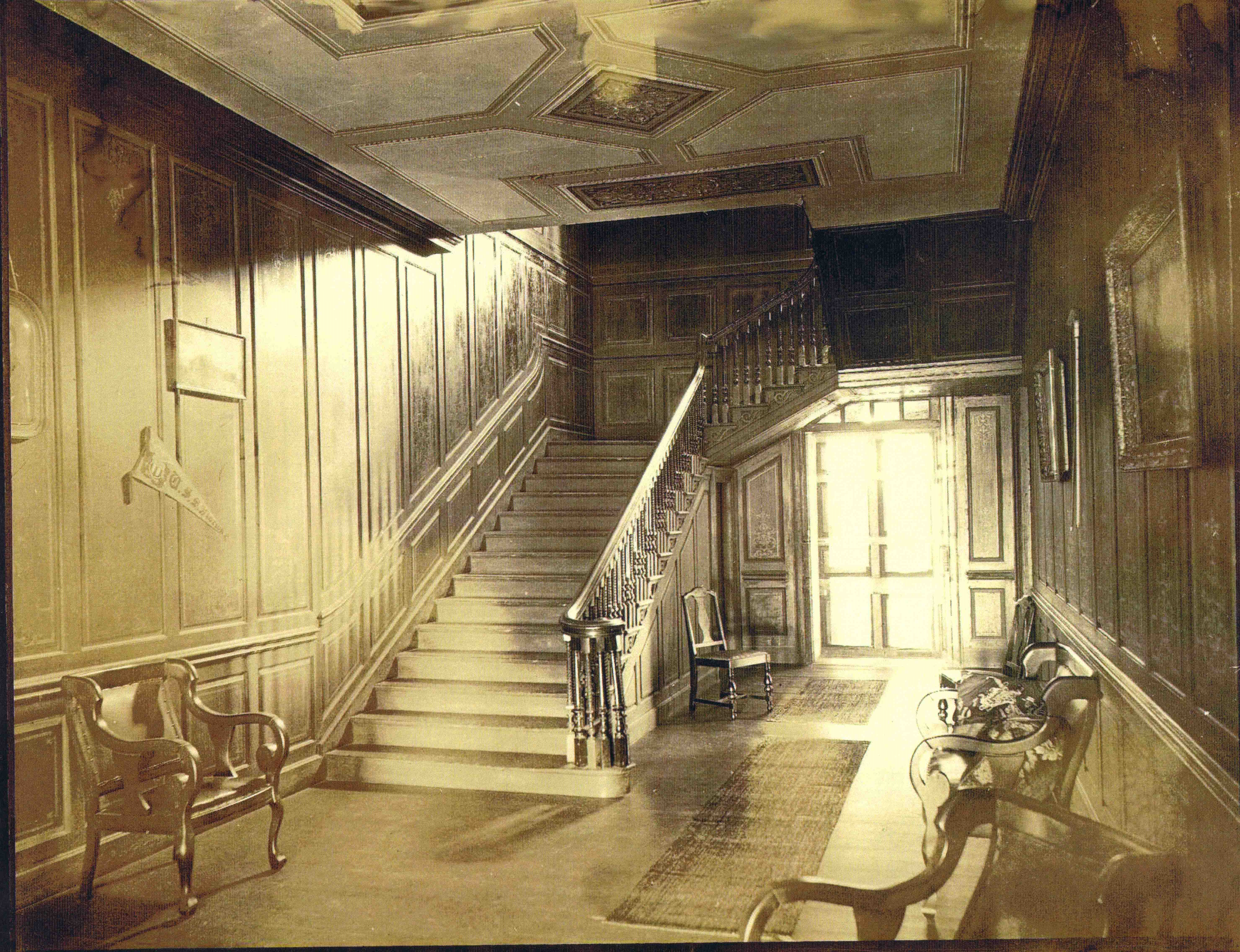
pre1930s

=== 20th century ===
Wilton was in danger of foreclosure during the Great Depression, and then it was purchased by The National Society of The Colonial Dames of America in the Commonwealth of Virginia in 1933 and was reconstructed along the banks of the James River, 15 miles west of its original location.

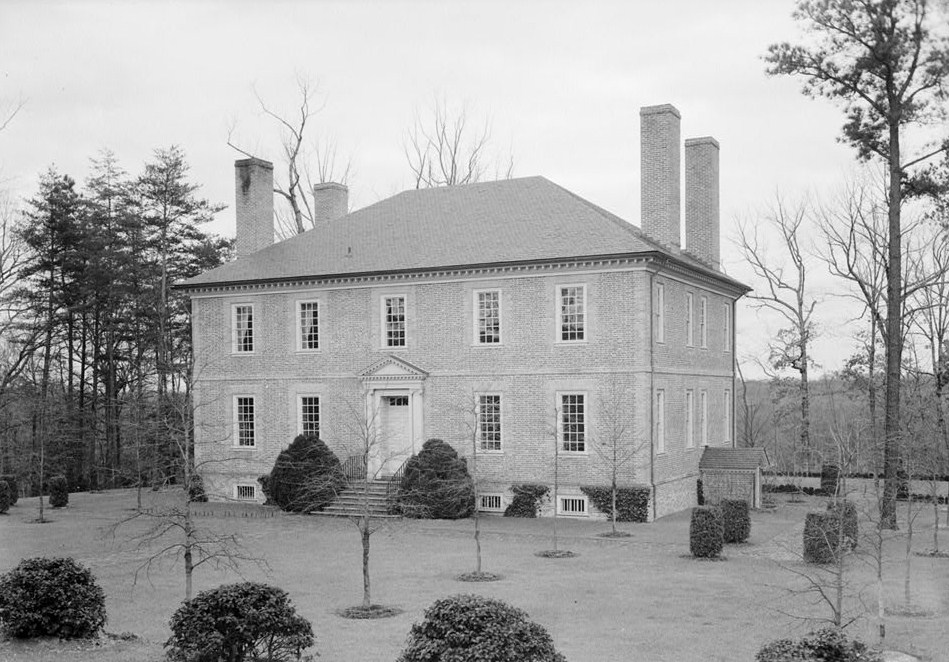
Relocation Landside 1935.

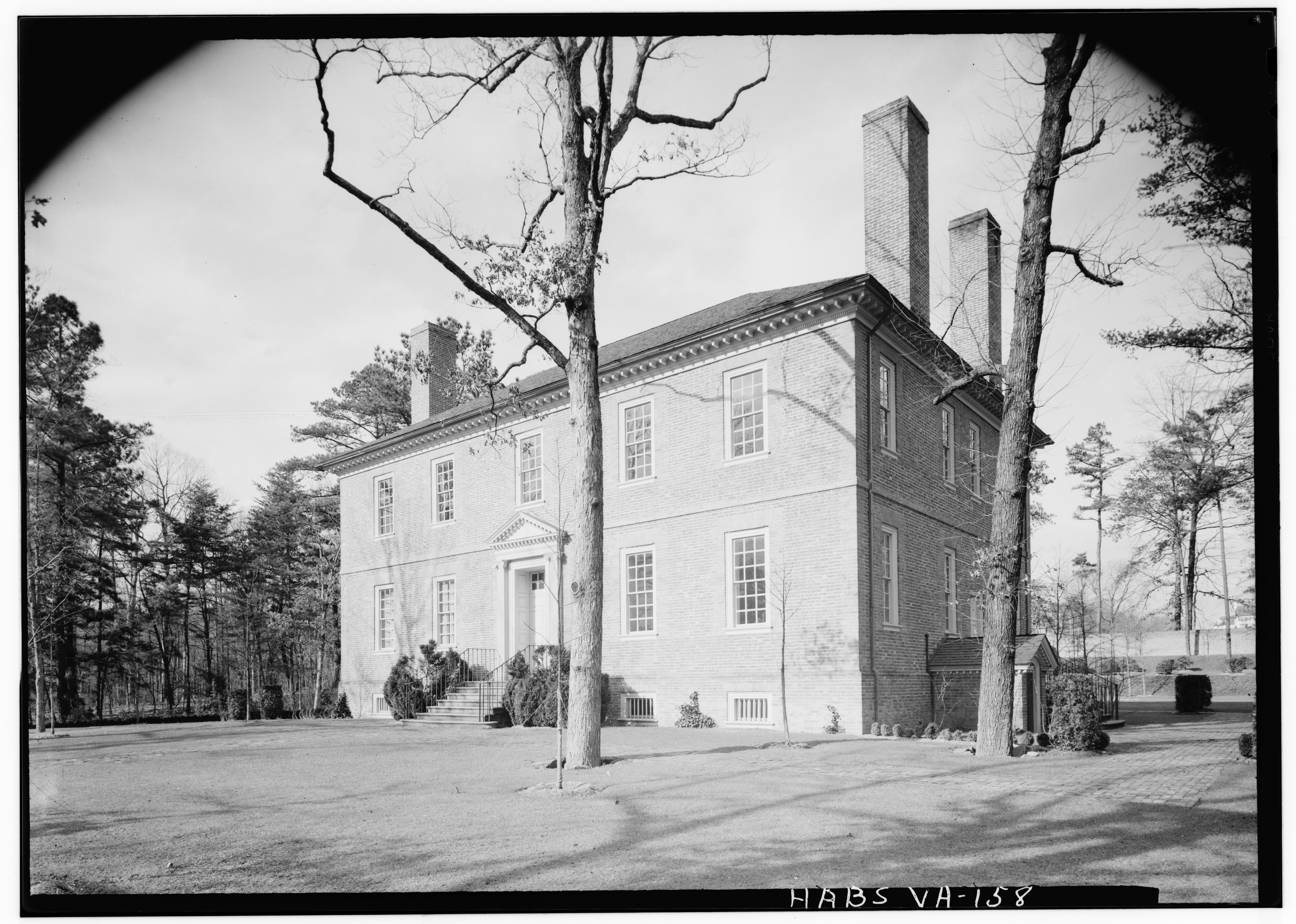
Relocation Landside 1935.

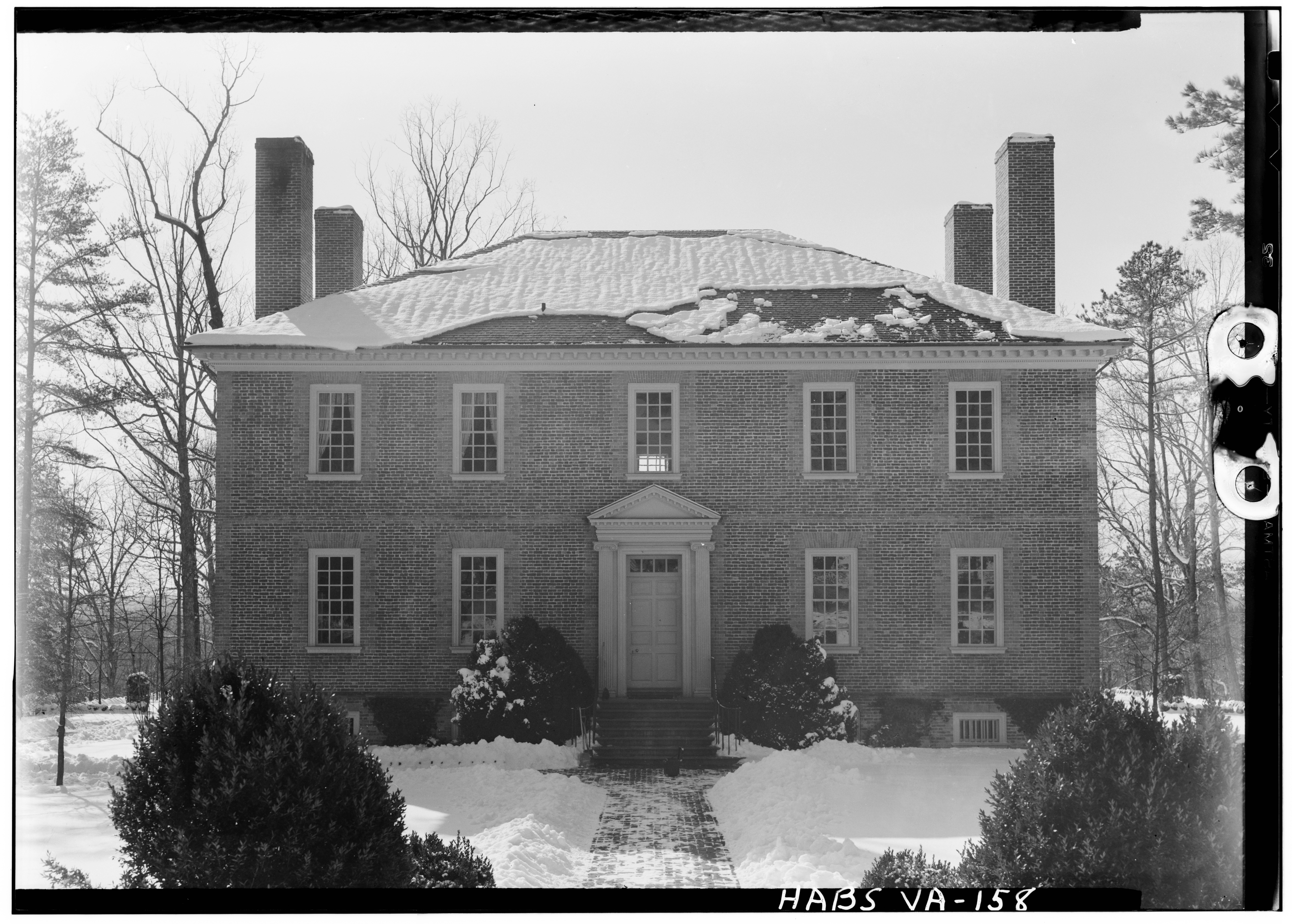
Relocation Riverside 1935.

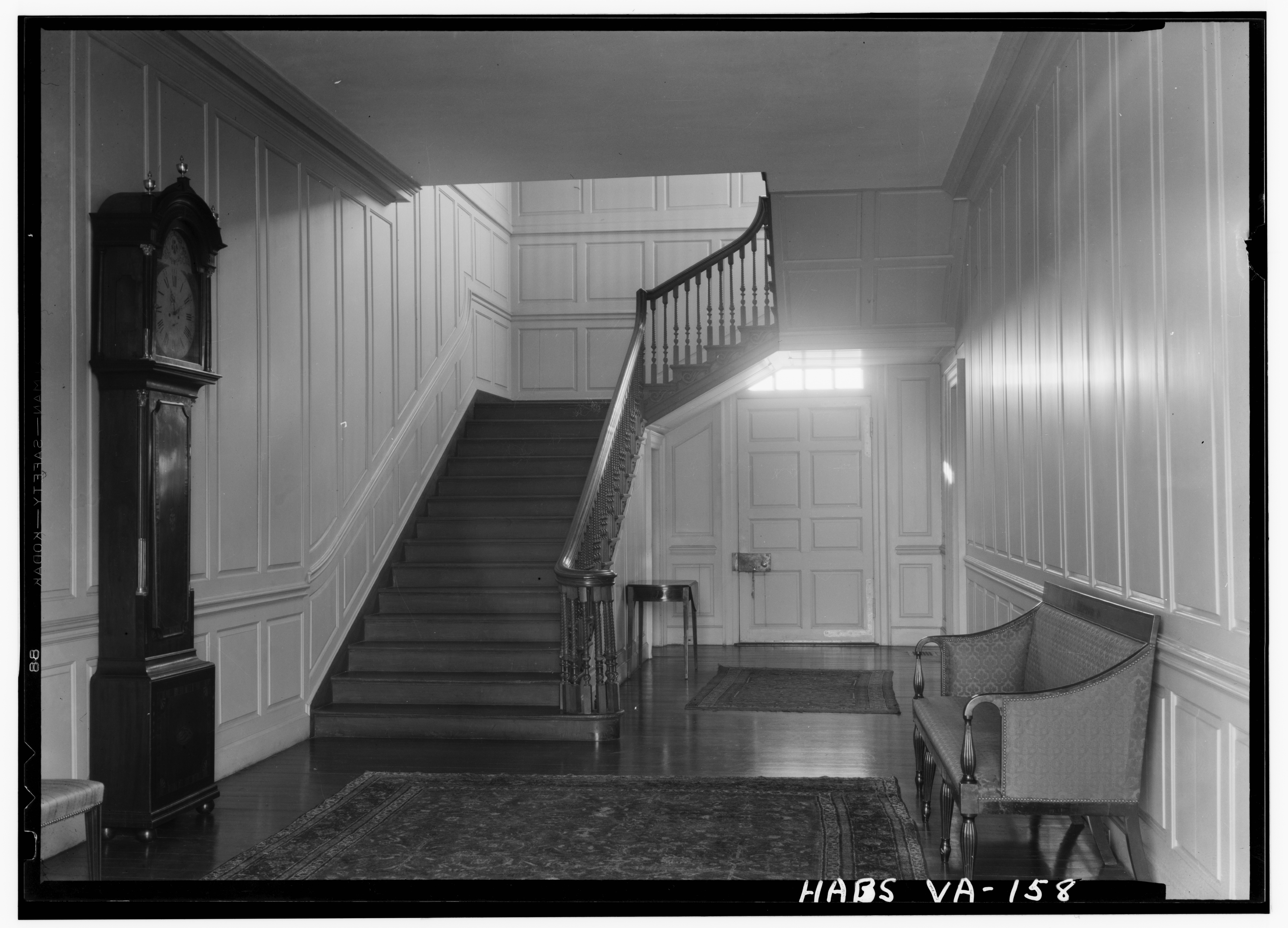
Relocation Lower Passage 1935.

== Museum collection ==
Wilton is Richmond's only 18th-century public plantation home, with an array of 1,400 artifacts. These 17th-, 18th-, and 19th-century pieces include silver, ceramics, textiles, paintings, documents, and furniture.
