= Robert Blair (musician) =

American musician

- Born: Robert Earl Blair; August 6, 1930
- Died: March 19, 2001 (aged 70)
- Genres: Gospel, traditional black gospel
- Occupations: Singer, songwriter
- Instruments: Vocals, singer-songwriter
- Years active: 1965–2001
- Labels: Checker, Atlanta International, Malaco, Chess, Gospel Jubilee, Grammercy, Bounce, New Direction
- Formerly of: The Fantastic Violinaires

Robert Earl Blair (August 6, 1930 – March 19, 2001), was an American gospel musician and leader of The Fantastic Violinaires originating from Detroit, Michigan from 1965 until his death. He started his music career, in 1965, with the release of Stand by Me by Checker Records. His album, The Pink Tornado, was released in 1988 by Atlanta International Records, and this was his breakthrough release upon the Billboard magazine Gospel Albums chart. He released 30 albums over the course of his career.

== Early life ==
Blair was born on August 6, 1930, as Robert Earl Blair.

== Music career ==
His music recording career commenced in 1965, with the album, Stand by Me, and it was released by Checker Records. He released an album in 1988 with Atlanta International Records, The Pink Tornado, and it was his breakthrough release upon the Billboard magazine Gospel Albums chart at No. 34. His music career ended at his death in 2001, and by that time he released 30 albums with several labels.

== Personal life ==
Blair died on March 19, 2001, of a heart attack.

== Discography ==
List of selected studio albums, with selected chart positions
Title	Album details	Peak chart positions
Title	Album details	US Gos
The Pink Tornado	Released: 1988; Label: Atlanta International; CD, digital download	34
