= Bill Blair (disambiguation) =

Bill Blair (born 1954) is a Canadian Minister and Member of Parliament and former Toronto Police Chief.

Bill Blair may also refer to:

- Bill Blair (American Association pitcher) (1863–1890), Major League Baseball player
- Bill Blair (basketball) (born 1942), American basketball coach
- Bill Blair (Negro Leagues pitcher) (1921–2014), Negro league pitcher
- Bill Blair (racing driver) (1911–1995), NASCAR Cup Series driver

== See also ==
- William Blair (disambiguation)
