= Matthew Blair =

Notable people named Matthew Blair include:

- Matt Blair (1950–2020), American football player
- Matty Blair (born 1989), English footballer
