= Paul Blair =

Paul Blair may refer to:

- Paul Blair (American football, born 1882) (1882–1904), American football player
- Paul Blair (American football, born 1963), American football offensive tackle
- Paul Blair (baseball) (1944–2013), American baseball player
- Paul Blair (Ontario politician) (born c. 1954), Canadian politician
- Paul Blair (swimming) (1949–2006), American swim coach
- DJ White Shadow (born 1978), American music producer and DJ, whose real name is Paul Blair
