= Richard Blair =

Richard Blair or similar, may refer to:

- Richard Blair (cricketer), English cricketer
- Richard Blair (musician), founder of ChocQuibTown
- Richard Blair (patron) (born 1944), son of George Orwell
- Richard Blair-Oliphant, American composer of music for film and television
- Rick Blair, former CEO of Examiner.com

== See also ==
- Richard (disambiguation)
- Blair (disambiguation)
