= Wildwood Park Historic District (Fort Wayne, Indiana) =

Historic district in Indiana, United States

- U.S. National Register of Historic Places
- U.S. Historic district
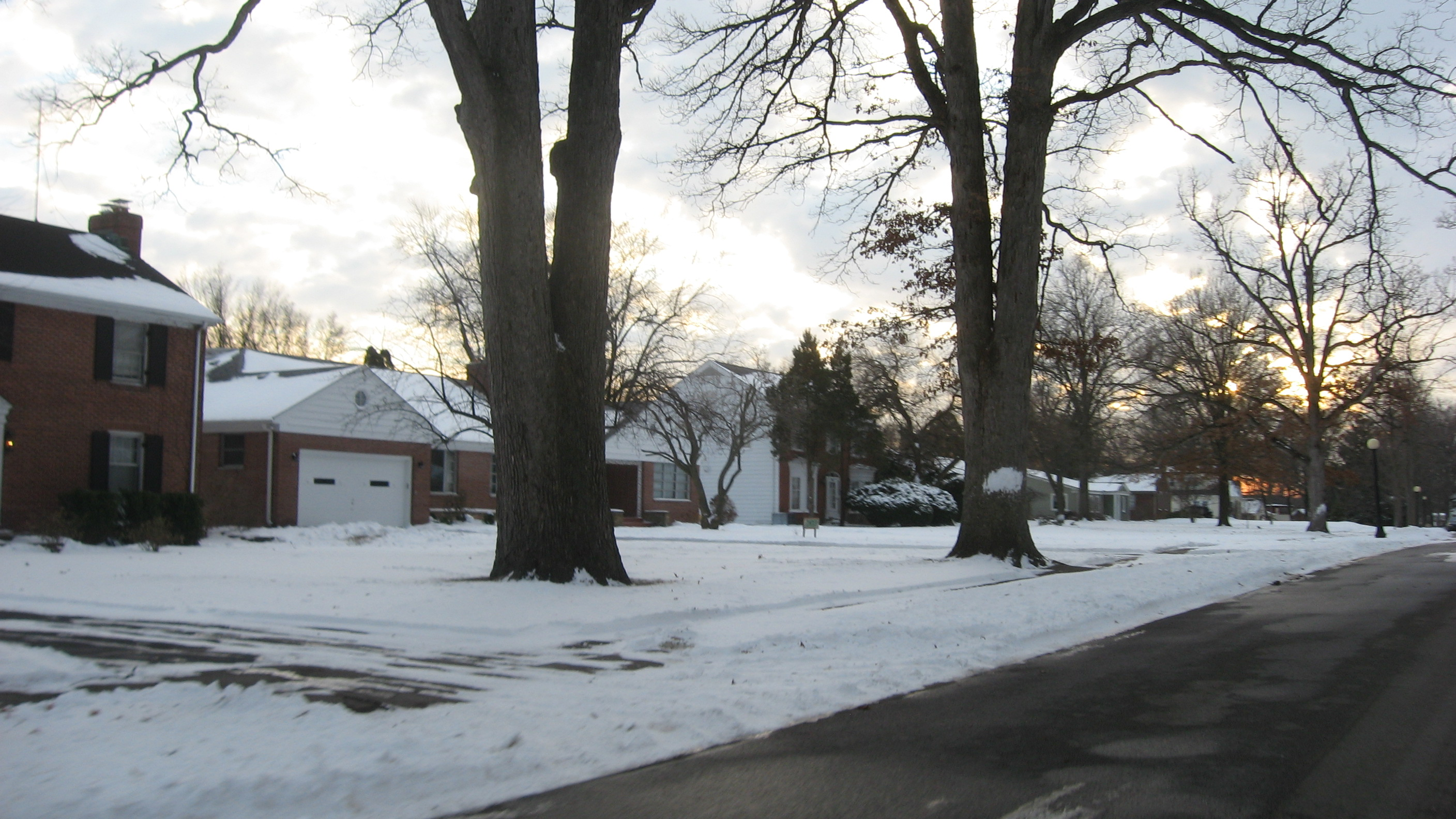
- Wildwood Park Historic District, January 2014

- Location within Indiana Location within the United States
- Location: Roughly bounded by Freeman St., Illinois Rd., W. Jefferson and Portage Boulevards, and Lindenwood and Ardmore Aves., Fort Wayne, Indiana
- Coordinates: 41°04′16″N 85°11′10″W
- Area: 160 acres (65 ha)
- Built: c. 1914-1955
- Architect: Shurcliff, Arthur
- Architectural style: Tudor Revival, Colonial Revival, Bungalow / craftsman et al.
- MPS: Park and Boulevard System of Fort Wayne, Indiana MPS
- NRHP reference No.: 13000720
- Added to NRHP: September 18, 2013

Wildwood Park Historic District is a national historic district located at Fort Wayne, Indiana. The district encompasses 190 contributing buildings, two contributing sites, and one contributing structure in a predominantly residential section of Fort Wayne. The area was developed from about 1914 to 1955, and includes examples of Colonial Revival, Tudor Revival, and Bungalow / American Craftsman style residential architecture. The neighborhood was platted and designed by landscape architect Arthur Asahel Shurcliff.

It was listed on the National Register of Historic Places in 2013.
