= William Blair =

William Blair may refer to:

- William Blair (American politician) (1820–1880), member of the Wisconsin State Senate
- William Blair (Australian footballer) (1912–1960), Australian footballer and umpire
- William Blair (Ayrshire MP) (died 1841), member of parliament for Ayrshire 1829–1832
- William Blair (judge) (born 1950), British judge and KC; elder brother of U.K. prime minister Tony Blair
- William Blair (Nova Scotia politician) (1836–1919), farmer and political figure in Nova Scotia, Canada
- William Blair (Royal Navy officer) (1741–1782), Scottish sailor and captain in the Royal Navy
- William Blair (Scottish footballer) (1872–?), Scottish international footballer
- William Blair (surgeon) (1766–1822), British surgeon and writer on ciphers
- William D. Blair, Jr (1937–2006), reporter, State Department spokesman, president of The Nature Conservancy
- William Gourlay Blair (1890–1957), Canadian politician and physician
- William H. Blair (1821–1888), American Civil War Union Brevet Brigadier General
- William John Blair (1875–1943), Canadian engineer and politician
- William M. Blair (1884–1982), investment banker from Chicago
- William McCormick Blair Jr. (1916–2015), U.S. ambassador; son of William M. Blair
- William Newsham Blair (1841–1891), New Zealand engineer and surveyor
- William R. Blair (1874–1962), American scientist and U.S. Army officer
- William R.N. Blair (1915–1990), Canadian psychologist and academic administrator
- William W. Blair (1828–1896), leader in the Reorganized Church of Jesus Christ of Latter Day Saints
- William Blair Tennent (1898–1976), New Zealand politician and cabinet minister
- Willie Blair (born 1965), American baseball player

== Companies ==
- William Blair & Company, a Chicago-based investment banking firm founded by William M. Blair

== See also ==
- Bill Blair (disambiguation)
