= Lewis Harvie Blair =

American businessman and author (1834–1916)

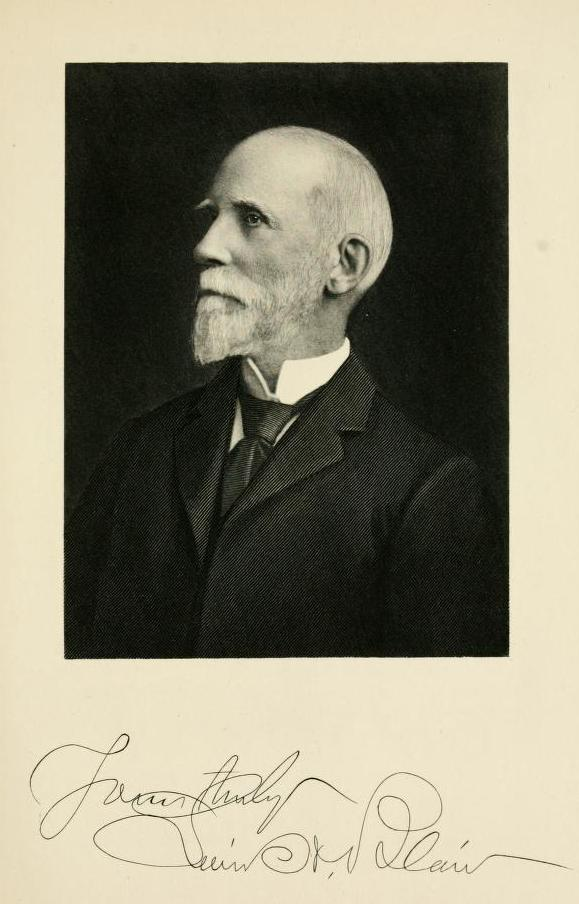
- Born: June 21, 1834; Richmond, Virginia, U.S.
- Died: November 26, 1916 (aged 82); Richmond, Virginia, U.S.
- Resting place: Hollywood Cemetery
- Occupations: Businessman, author
- Spouses: Alice Wayles Harrison (1867-1894, her death); Martha Ruffin Feild (1898-1916, his death)
- Children: 11 (7 with Harrison, 4 with Feild)

Lewis Harvie Blair (June 21, 1834 – November 26, 1916) was an American businessman, economics expert, and author.

== Personal life ==
Blair was born in Richmond, Virginia on June 21, 1834, to John Geddes Blair and Sara Ann Eyre Heron Blair. He had some formal schooling, but received most of his education through reading. During the Civil War Blair fought with the Confederate States Army with the Company A, 13th Battalion Virginia Light Artillery, where he was known for "challenging authority, engaging in fistfights, and spending time in stockade confinement". Blair would later consider his time spent with the Confederate army a waste, as he considered slavery a "most monstrous institution".

Blair was married twice. He married his first wife, Alice Wayles Harrison, in 1867, and the two had seven children together, including architect Walter Dabney Blair. Harrison's memoirs indicate that Blair and his wife took Alice's mother Lucy Harrison into their home and cared for her during her long final illness until she died there in 1881. Alice herself died in 1894. Blair married again in 1898 to Martha Ruffin Feild, with whom he had four daughters. He died on November 26, 1916, in Richmond of a heart attack and was buried in Hollywood Cemetery. His house on Richmond's Monument Avenue, designed by his son, is a contributing property to the Monument Avenue Historic District.

== Business opinions and career ==
Blair ran a wholesale auction business after returning from the Civil War and later ran a retail store, as well as a wholesale grocery business. His business ventures were extremely successful and Blair became very wealthy. He would frequently write to newspapers to criticize the concept of the New South, saying that it was something that was made up by people like Henry W. Grady. He argued that most of the South lived in abject poverty and that it was little better than it was prior in 1860.

In one instance Blair allegedly demonstrated a callous approach in his business affairs. At the outset of the Panic of 1893, he had made a loan to his brother-in-law, Rev. John Hartwell Harrison in Amelia County to enable payment of the taxes owed on his home; Harrison gave Blair title to the home to secure the debt. According to Harrison family memoirs, in 1896 the loan went into default in the third year of the nation’s depression. Blair sold the Harrison farm property, and the brother and sister-in-law of his deceased wife Alice, as well as her nephews, aged 17, 15, 9 and 7, were obliged to move from their home, after recently putting in their crops.

== Views on race ==
In his 1889 book The Prosperity of the South Dependent upon the Elevation of the Negro, Blair called for greater equality, equal rights, voting rights, and better education for African Americans - even endorsing integration. He argued that trying to repress them would only bring the South down and was a waste of energy. Historian Fred C. Hobson later commented in his research that while Blair's opinions were similar to those of George Washington Cable, he was able to voice them without receiving as much criticism as Cable. Hobson credits this to Blair living further North than Cable (who lived in New Orleans) and because Blair was wealthy and came from a prominent family.

Later in life Blair rejected his earlier opinions, stating in an unpublished manuscript that he believed African Americans to be inferior to whites, called for the Fourteenth and Fifteenth Amendments to be repealed, and also argued for disenfranchisement and segregation. His change in stance has been compared to Thomas E. Watson.

== Bibliography ==
- Unwise Laws: A Consideration of the Operations of a Protective Tariff upon Industry, Commerce, and Society (1886)
- The Prosperity of the South Dependent upon the Elevation of the Negro (1889)
- A Standard of Value, Considered in its Relation to the Currency (1893)
