= Blair (poet) =

American musician and poet

David Blair (September 19, 1967 – July 23, 2011), known as Blair, was an American musician and poet from Detroit, Michigan who competed in the 2002 National Poetry Slam and was nominated for seven Detroit Music Awards. Blair toured in the United States, South Africa and Germany, performing with various artists, including Stevie Wonder and Wilco.
