= Terry Blair =

Terry Blair is the name of:

- Terry Blair (serial killer) (born 1961), American serial killer
- Terry Blair (politician) (1946–2014), member of the Ohio House of Representatives

== See also ==
- Terre Blair (born 1956), journalist and producer
