= Walter Dabney Blair =

American architect

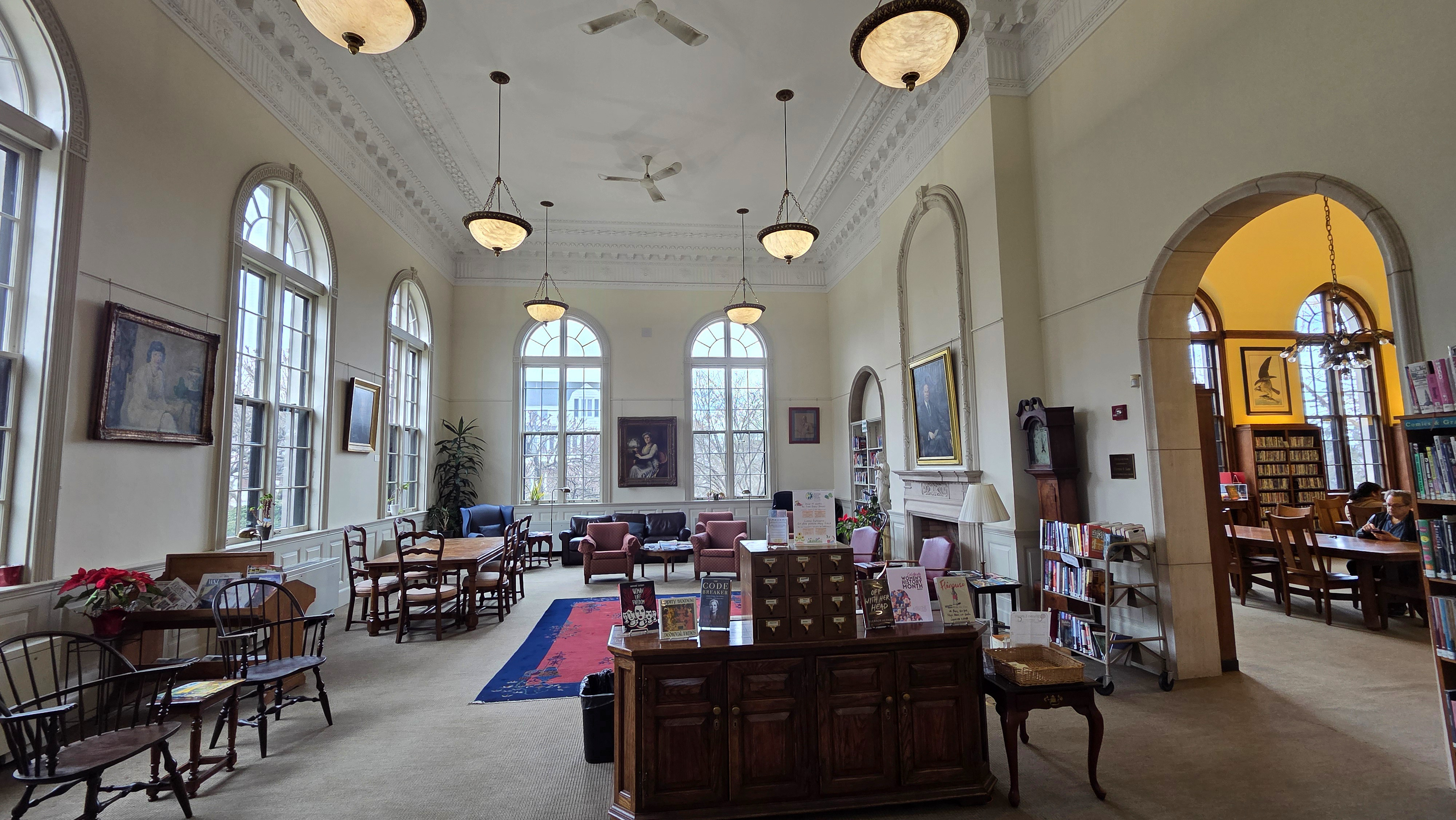
- Interior of Warner Library in Tarrytown, New York
- Born: June 14, 1877; Amelia, Virginia, U.S.
- Died: January 11, 1953 (aged 75); Tarrytown, New York, U.S.
- Education: Richmond College; University of Virginia; University of Pennsylvania; École des Beaux-Arts
- Occupation: Architect
- Spouse(s): Ethel Gould; Elizabeth Hollister Frost

Walter Dabney Blair (June 14, 1877 – January 11, 1953) was an American architect. Two of his buildings—Grelen, a Georgian Revival house near Orange, Virginia, and (with James Edwin Ruthven Carpenter Jr.) The Stahlman in Nashville, Tennessee—are listed on the National Register of Historic Places. The Lewis H. Blair House on Monument Avenue in Richmond, Virginia, designed by Blair for his father, is a contributing property to the Monument Avenue Historic District.

== Early life ==
Blair was born on June 14, 1877, in Amelia, Virginia, near Richmond, the son of Alice Wayles Harrison and Lewis Harvie Blair, a prominent businessman, author, and political thinker. He attended Richmond College, the University of Virginia, the University of Pennsylvania, and the École des Beaux-Arts, studying architecture.

== Career ==
Blair taught Architectural Design at Cornell University in 1903–1904. He designed several buildings on the campus of the University of Virginia as well as the McIntire Public Library in Charlottesville. Also in Virginia is Grelen, a Georgian Revival house near Orange, designed by Blair in 1935; it was listed on the National Register of Historic Places in 1998. Blair also designed the Warner Library in Tarrytown, New York, and the Edwin Gould Foundation building in New York City.

One of his early projects is the Lewis H. Blair House on the historic Monument Avenue in Richmond, Virginia, designed by Blair for his father. Built in 1913, the Colonial Revival house is the only building on the avenue with a monumental, two-story portico (a staple of Southern residential architecture). The house (at 2327 Monument Avenue) is a contributing property to the Monument Avenue Historic District.

The McIntire Public Library in Charlottesville, "a diminutive jewel of a building," follows the tradition of Jeffersonian classicism. Blair's Warner Library in Tarrytown (where he resided) differs greatly from the many Carnegie libraries built during the same period across America, whose simplified design was guided by efficiency considerations. His Neoclassical design incorporates intricate scrollwork, fifteen-foot windows, Ionic columns, Grecian figural urns flanking the entrance, and an oculus in the lobby ceiling inspired by the Roman Pantheon. Blair's other notable local work is the 1926 Italianate bathhouse at Kingsland Point Park in the neighboring Sleepy Hollow.

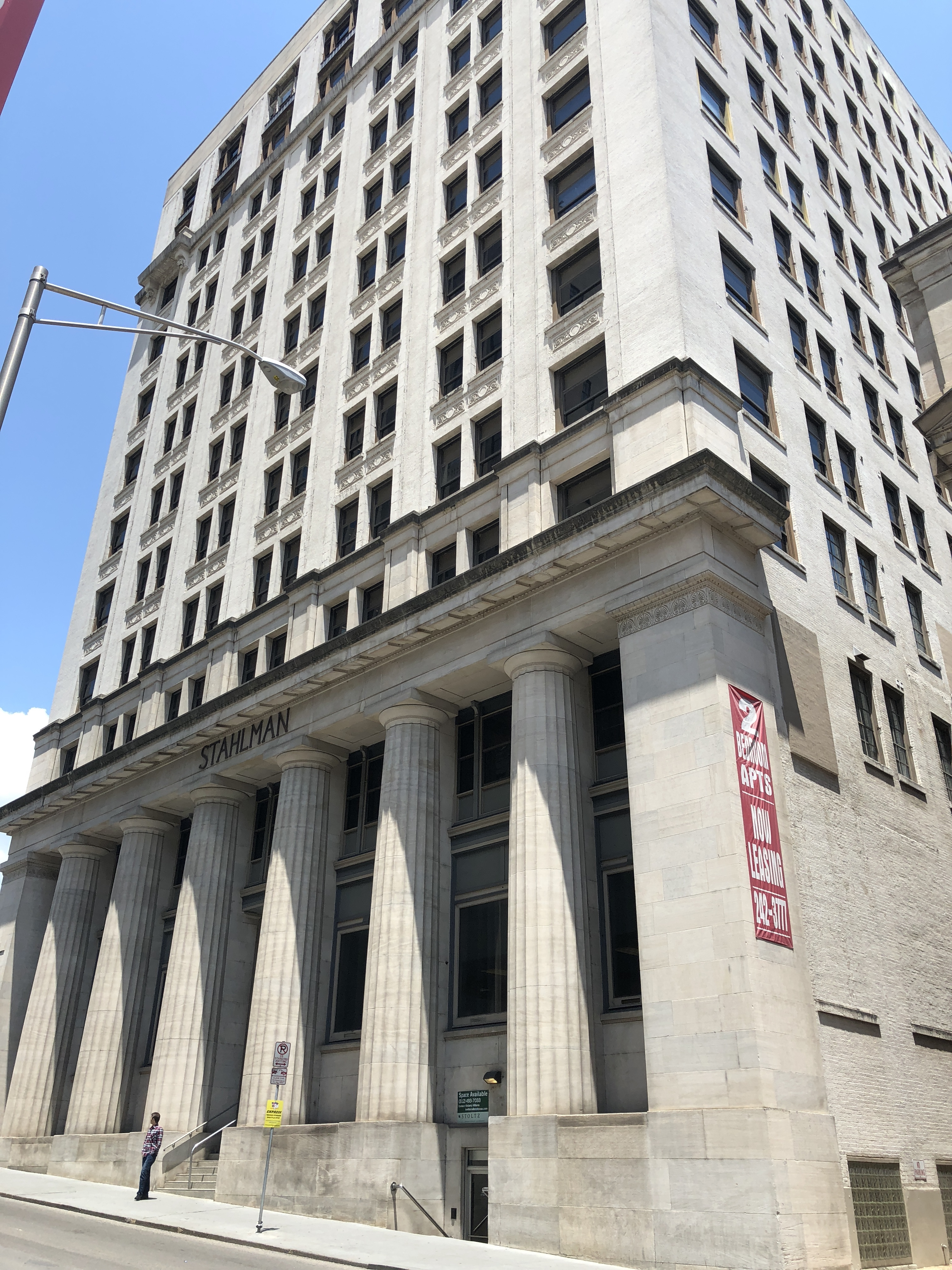
The Stahlman (Nashville, Tennessee)

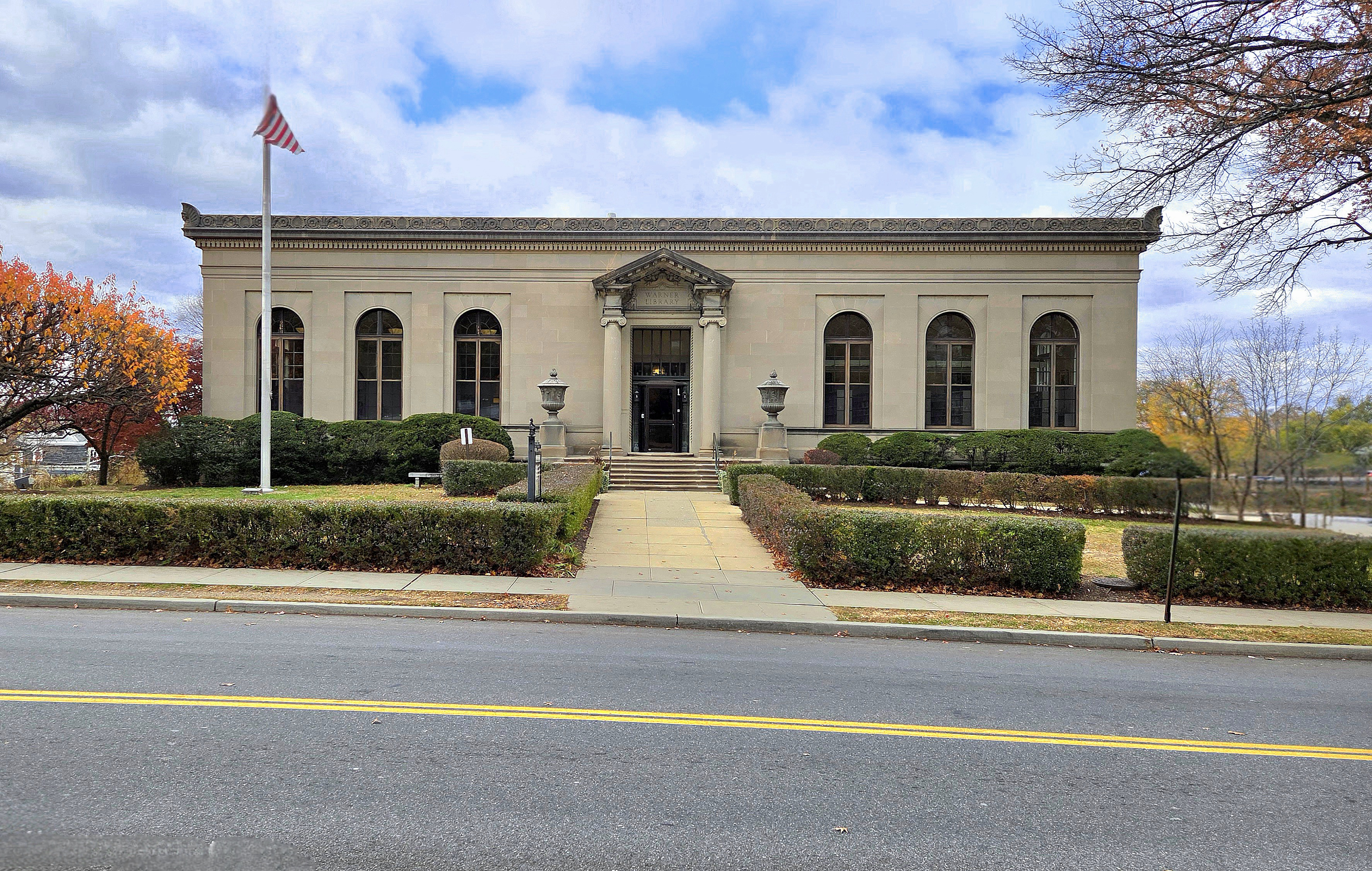
Warner Library (Tarrytown, New York)

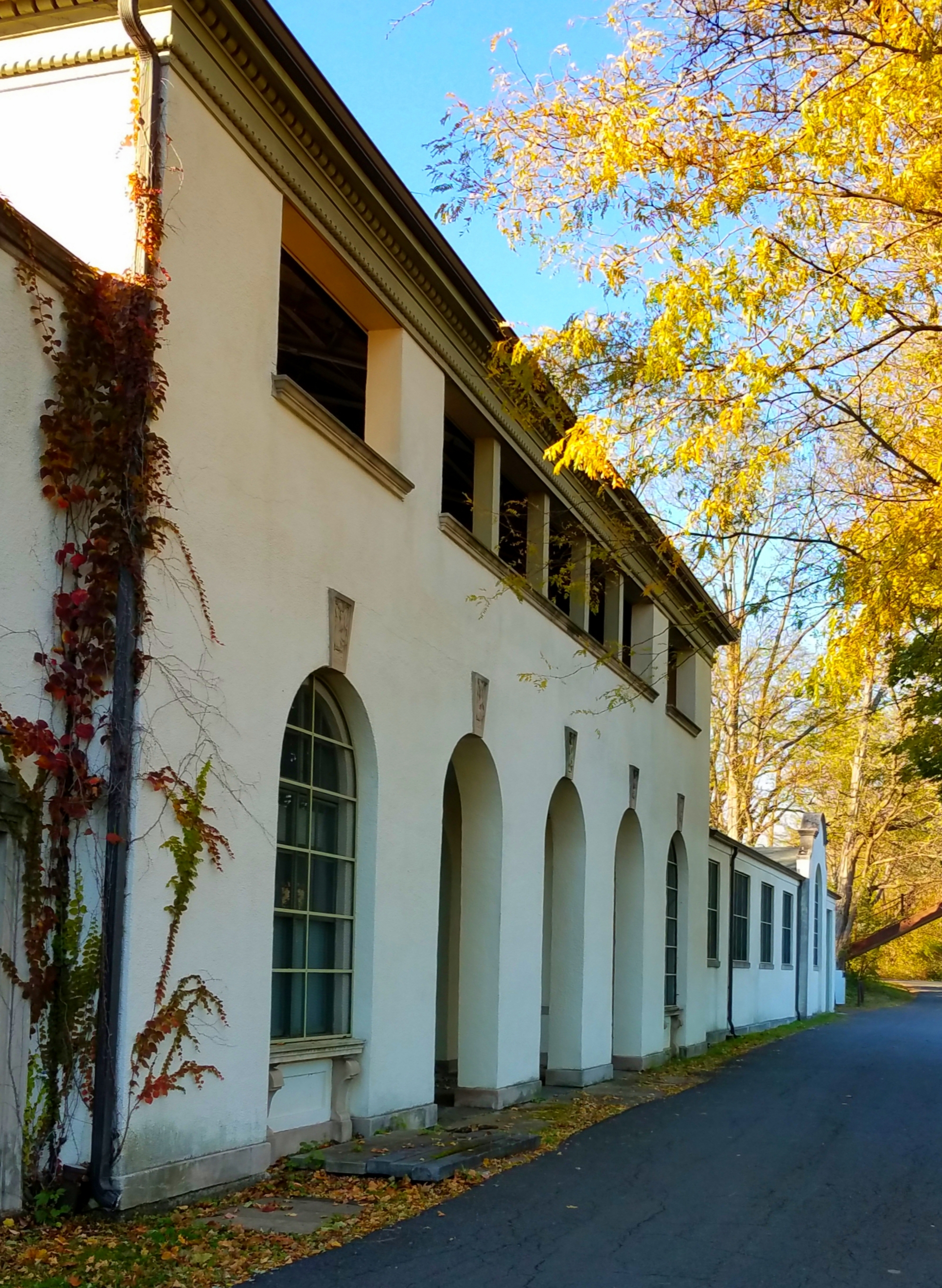
Bathhouse (Sleepy Hollow, New York)

With James Edwin Ruthven Carpenter Jr., he designed The Stahlman in Nashville, Tennessee, in 1906–1907. The building is considered one of the city's first skyscrapers; its architectural design features a base composed of a Doric colonnade rising three floors. It was listed on the National Register of Historic Places in 2002 as a contributing property to the Nashville Financial Historic District.

== Personal life and death ==
Blair was married twice. His first wife was Ethel Gould, sister of another prominent architect, Carl Frelinghuysen Gould, a former partner of Blair's in an architectural firm. His second wife, Elizabeth Hollister Frost, was a poet. He resided in Tarrytown, New York, where he died on January 11, 1953. He is buried at Sleepy Hollow Cemetery in Sleepy Hollow, New York.
