= Robert Blair (antiquarian) =

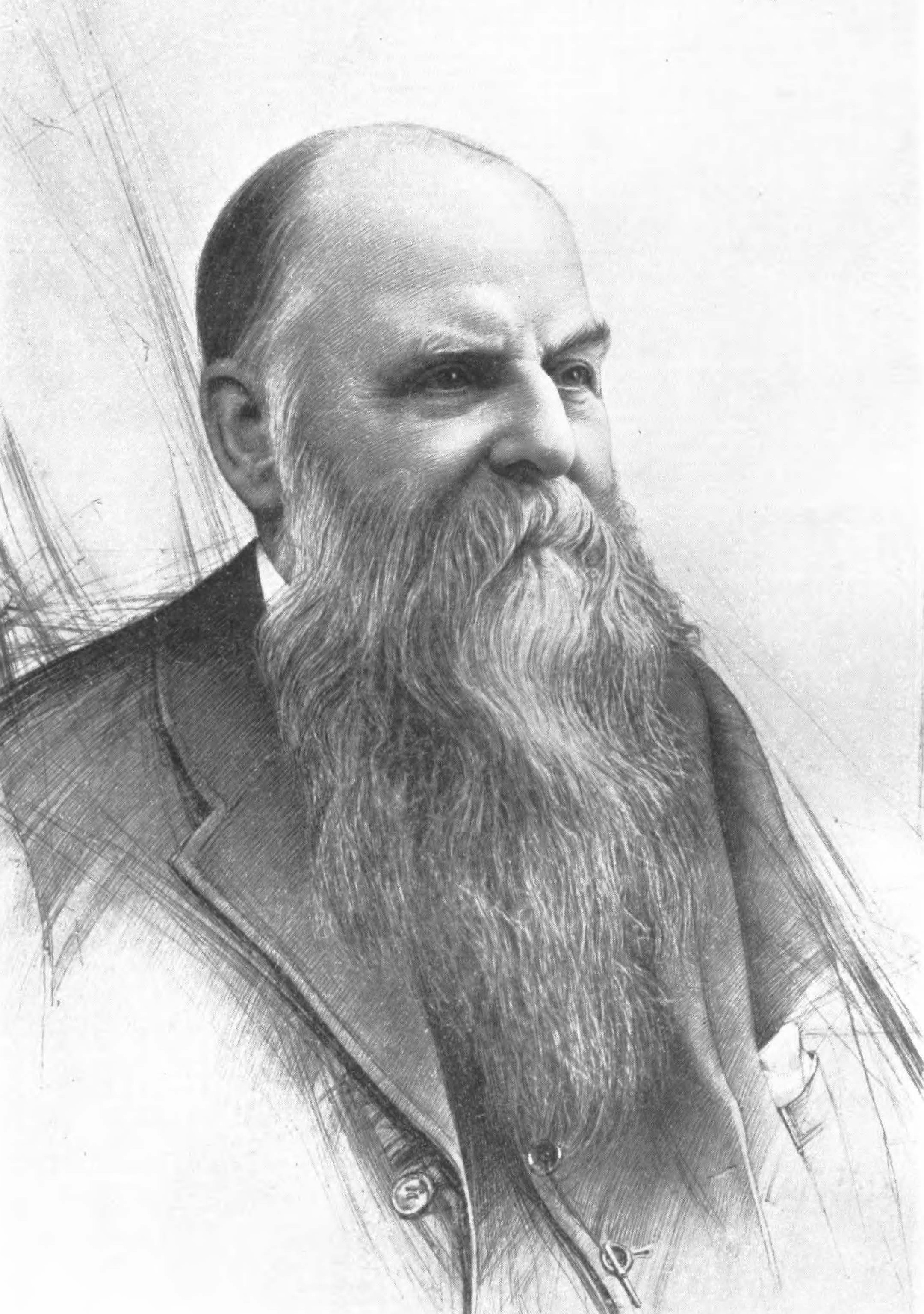
Portrait image of Robert Blair
Robert Blair
- Born: 8 June 1845
- Died: 14 July 1923 (aged 78)
- Occupation: Solicitor
- Known for: Antiquarian research

Robert Blair (8 June 1845 - 14 July 1923) was an antiquarian and solicitor from South Shields, England. He was instrumental in the early investigations of the Roman fort at South Shields, now known as Arbeia. As well as his antiquarian work he was also secretary of the Society of Antiquaries of Newcastle upon Tyne, and editor of their journal Archaeologia Aeliana.

== Early life ==
Blair was born in South Shields, in an area known as The Lawe on 8 June 1845. He credited his early interest in Roman antiquities to when his uncle gave him a Roman coin which had been found at The Lawe. His father James Blair was a river boat pilot on the Tyne. He left school at 13 and became an office boy with the firm of Thomas Salmon, solicitor. While working as an office boy he substituted his education by attending night classes at the South Shields Mechanics Institute (now the South Shields Museum and Art Gallery).

== Society of Antiquaries of Newcastle upon Tyne ==
Blair became a member of the Society of Antiquaries of Newcastle upon Tyne on 7 January 1874, and became secretary of the Society on 31 January 1883. From 1884 until his death he was editor of the journal Archaeologia Aeliana, as well as editor of the 4th-8th editions of Collingwood Bruce's Handbook to the Roman Wall.

== Research ==
Blair was particularly interested in Roman coins and his catalogues of coins appears in several volumes of Archaeologia Aeliana, though often uncredited. Many of his artefact studies were printed as notes in the Proceedings of the Society of Antiquaries of Newcastle and the Proceedings of the Society of Antiquaries of London. Another one of his key research interests was in church plate and church bells in Northumberland and Durham. His records surveying the historic counties of Northumberland, Durham, and North Yorkshire were recording in the Proceedings of the Society of Antiquaries of Newcastle. In June 1884 he was elected a Fellow of the Society of Antiquaries of London.

== Personal life ==
Robert Blair married Elizabeth Eleanor Watt (died 26 February 1905) in 1866, the daughter of South Shields ship owner James Watt. They had 13 children. He later married Mary Philipson in 1907. He is buried in Harton Cemetery.
