= Charles R. Weatherhogg =

- Born: 1872; Donington, England
- Died: October 15, 1937 (aged 65); Whitley County, Indiana
- Education: Art Institute of Lincoln
- Occupation: Architect

Charles R. Weatherhogg (1872 – October 15, 1937) was an American architect from Fort Wayne, Indiana. He was born in Donington, England, and attended the Art Institute of Lincoln in Lincolnshire. He worked for an architect in Lincolnshire before coming to the United States to see the 1893 World's Fair, lived in Chicago for a year, and settled in Fort Wayne in 1892.

He settled in Fort Wayne, working briefly with the firm of Wing & Mahurin, before he opened an office with Alfred Grindle, himself a fellow Wing and Mahurin employee. Grindle and Weatherhogg maintained a partnership from about 1893–1897. They had a branch office in Muncie and designed a number of large homes in that city. Their most important project together was the Jasper County Courthouse, 1897, also in Rensselaer. Grindle first received the commission for the Jasper County Courthouse, then brought in Weatherhogg. Grindle left the project entirely to Weatherhogg, who then completed most of the design work. The courthouse is an imposing three story limestone building with tower executed in the Chateauesque/Tudor Revival style. Weatherhogg went on to design a number of buildings in Fort Wayne, including several schools, the Masonic Temple, Blackstone Building, Fairfield Apartments, and the People's Trust and Savings Bank. Although adept at many styles, Weatherhogg often used a variant of classicism in his works

Weatherhogg had a brief partnership with Alfred Grindle until Grindle moved to Muncie.

== Work ==
- Hoagland High School (Heritage Elementary). Set to be demolished in 2020
- Louis Curdes House
- Neizer-McMillen House (McMillen Mansion) at 1345 Westover Road in Southwood Park, in Fort Wayne
- North Side High School
- Journal-Gazette Building
- Central High School (Fort Wayne, Indiana)
- Fairfield Manor
- Estelle Peabody Memorial Home and later addition, as well as the Memorial Chapel, Memorial Tower, and the residence of Tom Peabody, Manchester
- Central school building, his first work in North Manchester, Indiana
- John Snyder residence, Manchester
- Manchester College gymnasium, Manchester
- Jasper County Courthouse, Rensselaer
- Rensselaer Carnegie Library
- Irene Byron Tuberculosis Sanatorium
- J.C. Johnson House, Muncie, Indiana

== See also ==
- McColloch-Weatherhogg Double House
