= Blackstone Building =

Blackstone Building may refer to:

- Blackstone's Department Store Building (1916), a contributing property in the Broadway Theater and Commercial District
- Blackstone's Building (Los Angeles) (1907), a non-contributing property in the Broadway Theater and Commercial District
- Blackstone Building (Fort Wayne, Indiana), listed on the NRHP in Indiana
- Blackstone Building (Tyler, Texas), listed on the NRHP in Texas
