= Irene Byron Tuberculosis Sanatorium =

- Irene Byron Tuberculosis Sanatorium-Physician Residences
- Formerly listed on the U.S. National Register of Historic Places
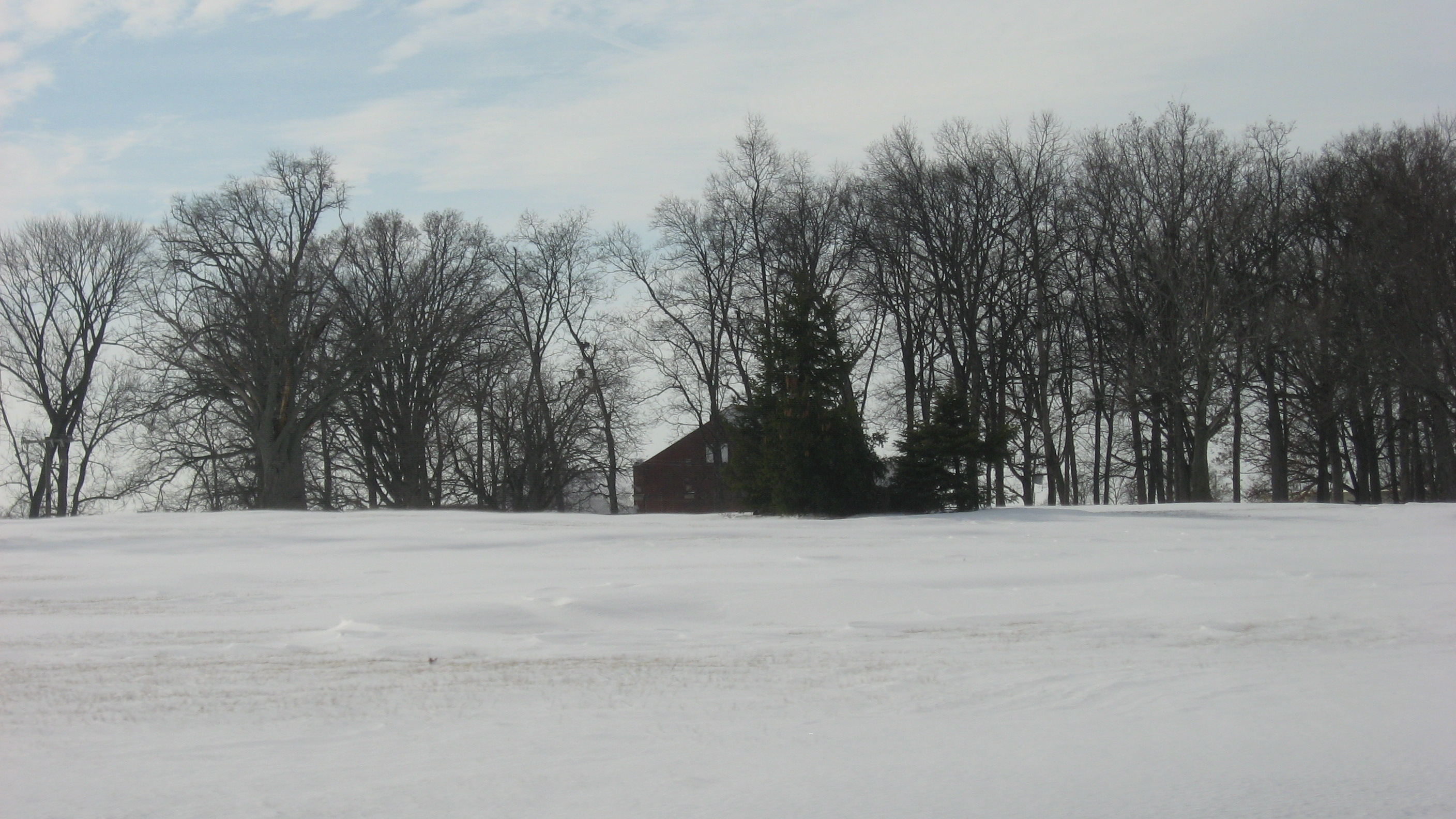
- Irene Byron Tuberculosis Sanatorium grounds, January 2014

- Location within Indiana Location within the United States
- Location: 12371 and 12407 Lima Rd., north of Fort Wayne, Indiana
- Coordinates: 41°11′48″N 85°10′12″W
- Area: 3.6 acres (1.5 ha)
- Built: 1934-1935
- Architect: Weatherhogg, Charles R.
- Architectural style: Colonial Revival, Tudor Revival
- NRHP reference No.: 04001316

Significant dates
- Added to NRHP: December 6, 2004
- Removed from NRHP: December 31, 2013

Irene Byron Tuberculosis Sanatorium-Physician Residences, also known as the Kidder and Draper-Sherwood Houses, were two historic homes located in Perry Township, Allen County, Indiana. They were designed by architect Charles R. Weatherhogg and built in 1934–1935 as housing for the medical director and head staff physician. Weatherhogg had earlier designed the sanatarium complex. The Kidder house was a two-story, Tudor Revival style frame dwelling with brick and stone cladding. The Draper-Sherwood House was a two-story, Colonial Revival style frame dwelling with one-story side wings. Surrounding the houses was a contributing formal landscape design.

It was listed on the National Register of Historic Places in 2004 and delisted in 2013.
