= Journal-Gazette Building =

- U.S. National Register of Historic Places
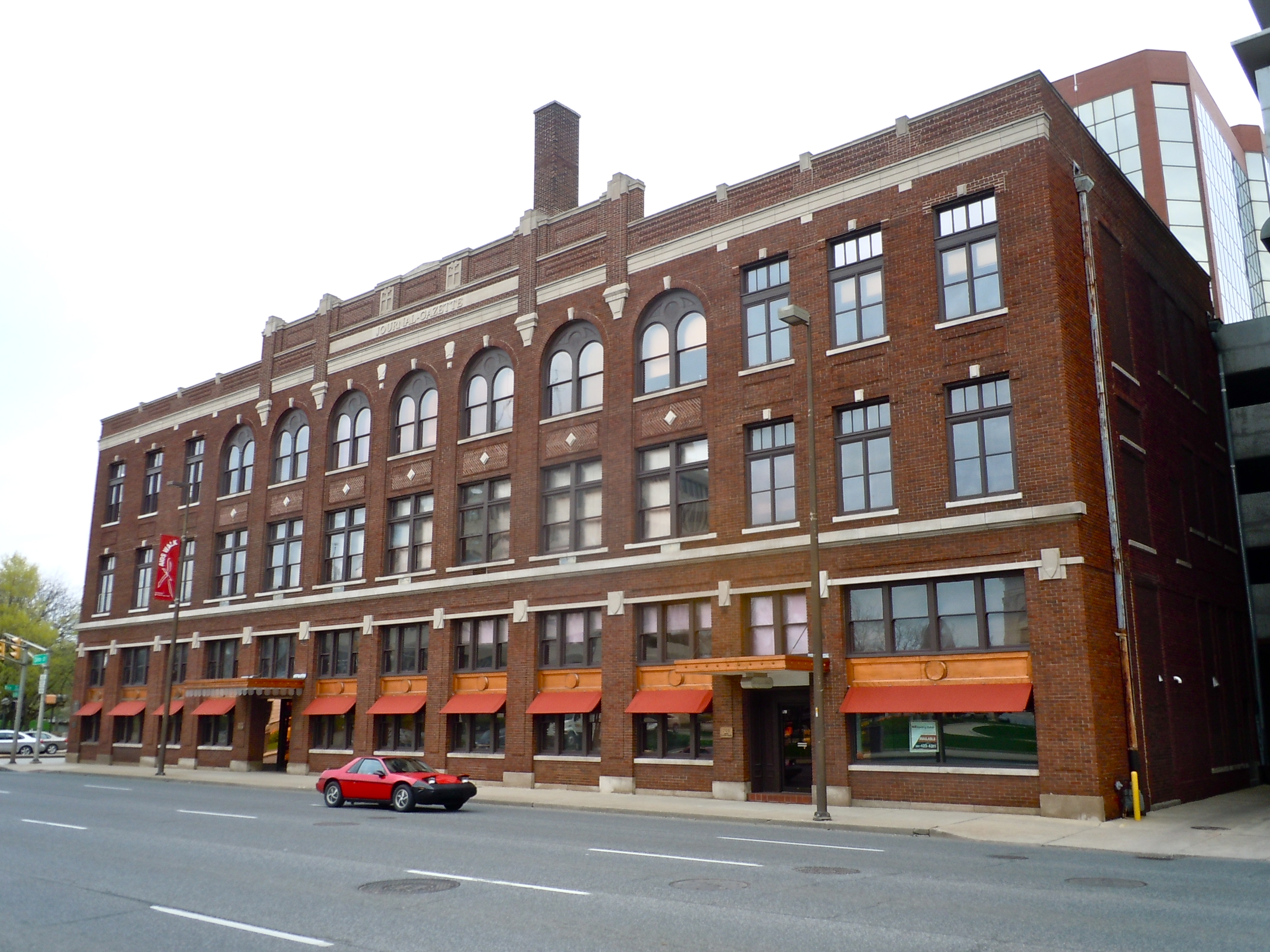
- Journal-Gazette Building, April 2011

- Location within Indiana Location within the United States
- Location: 701 South Clinton Street, Fort Wayne, Indiana
- Coordinates: 41°4′49″N 85°8′17″W
- Area: less than one acre
- Built: 1927-1928
- Architect: Weatherhogg, Charles, R.
- Architectural style: Chicago
- NRHP reference No.: 82000057
- Added to NRHP: December 27, 1982

The Journal-Gazette Building is a historic commercial building located in downtown Fort Wayne, Indiana. It was designed by noted Fort Wayne architect Charles R. Weatherhogg and built in 1927–1928. It is a four-story, 13 bay, red brick building with limestone trim in the Chicago Style. The seven central bays feature round arch window openings. For many years the building housed The Journal Gazette newspaper plant.

It was listed on the National Register of Historic Places in 1982.
