= Masonic Temple (Fort Wayne, Indiana) =

- U.S. National Register of Historic Places
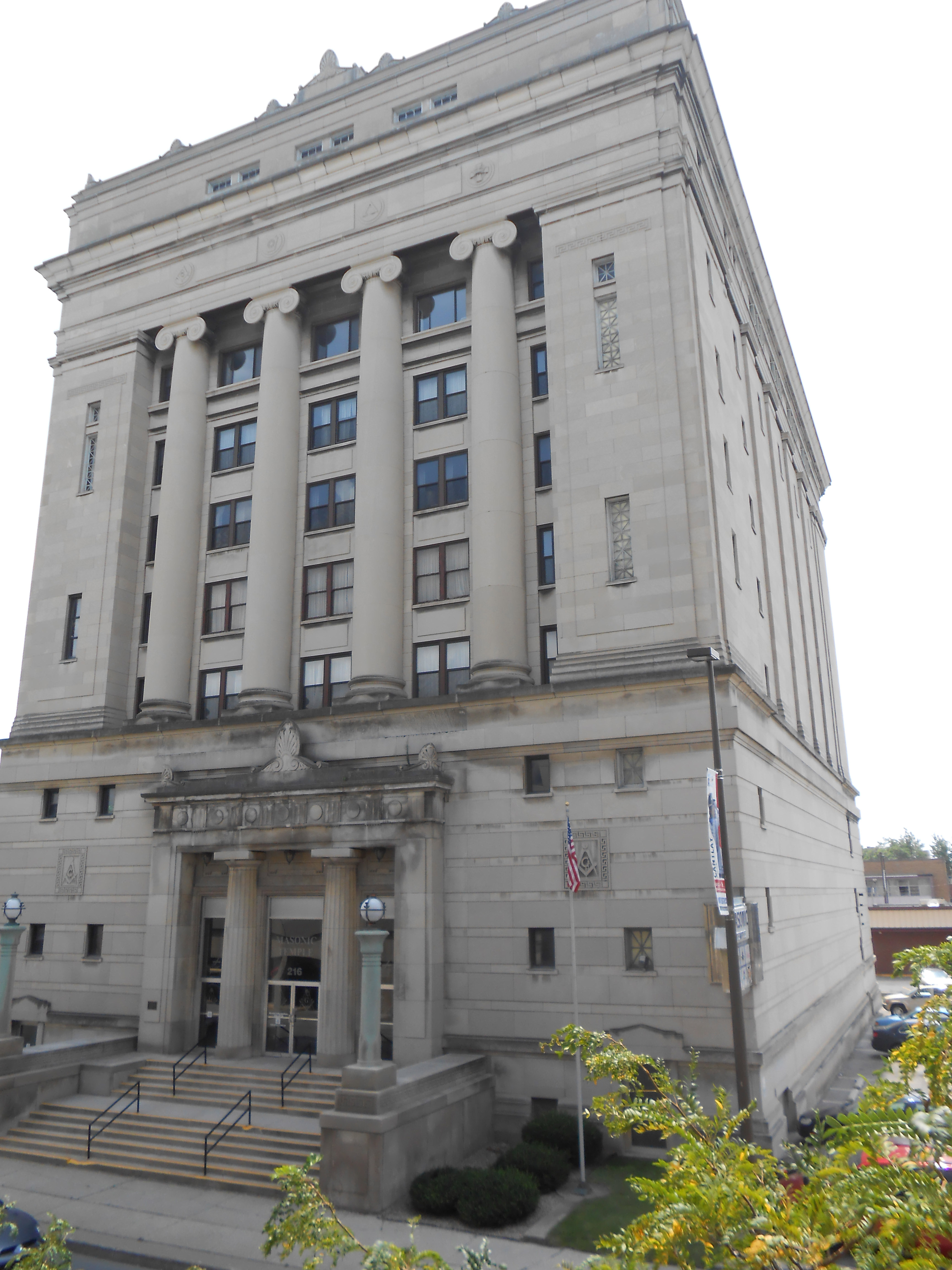

- Location within Indiana Location within the United States
- Location: 206 East Washington Boulevard, Fort Wayne, Indiana
- Coordinates: 41°4′39″N 85°8′55″W
- Area: less than one acre
- Built: 1926
- Architect: Weatherhogg, Charles A.
- Architectural style: Classical Revival
- NRHP reference No.: 91000273
- Added to NRHP: March 14, 1991

The Masonic Temple is a historic Masonic Lodge located at Fort Wayne, Indiana. It was designed by architect Charles R. Weatherhogg (1872–1937) and built in 1926. It is a 12-story, rectangular Classical Revival style steel frame building faced with Indiana limestone. The front facade features four five-story Ionic order columns alternating with window openings.

It was listed on the National Register of Historic Places in 1991.

== See also ==
- List of Masonic buildings in Indiana
- National Register of Historic Places listings in Allen County, Indiana
