= Fairfield Manor =

- U.S. National Register of Historic Places
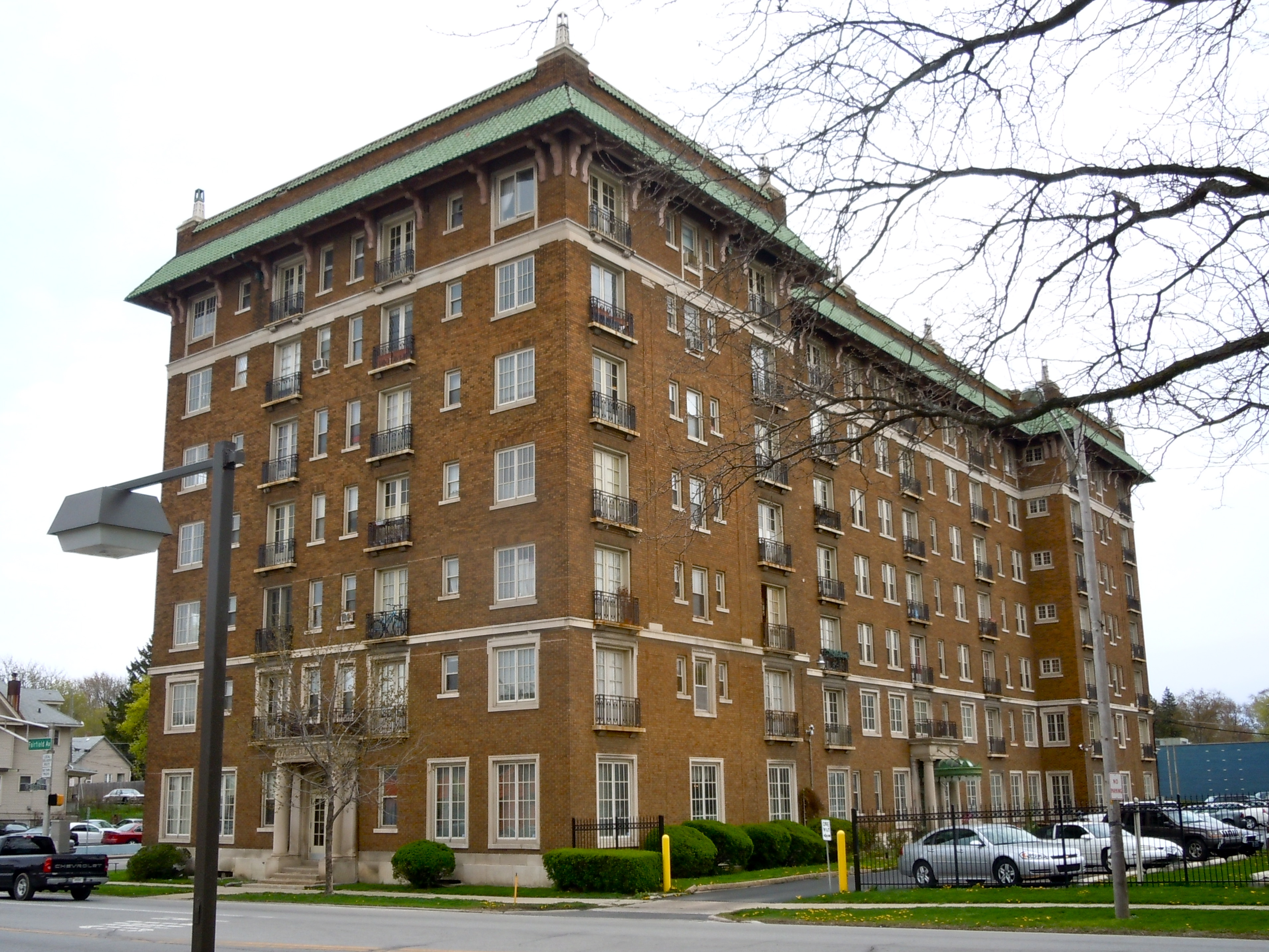
- Fairfield Manor, April 2011

- Location within Indiana Location within the United States
- Location: 2301 Fairfield Ave., Fort Wayne, Indiana
- Coordinates: 41°3′50″N 85°8′41″W
- Area: less than one acre
- Built: 1927-1928
- Architect: Weatherhogg, Charles R.
- Architectural style: Colonial Revival, Bungalow/craftsman, Art Deco
- NRHP reference No.: 83000047
- Added to NRHP: June 16, 1983

Fairfield Manor, also known as the Fairfield Manor Apartments, is a historic apartment building located one mile south of downtown Fort Wayne, Indiana. It was designed by noted Fort Wayne architect Charles R. Weatherhogg. It is a seven-story plus basement, rectangular, Colonial Revival style brick building with a slight "bar-bell" form. It has American Craftsman and interior Art Deco design elements. The building measures 68 feet by 190 feet.

The apartment building was owned by the Fairfield Realty Group, formed by Olaf N. Guildin (a Norwegian-American immigrant from Oslo who established himself as a prominent local industrialist after breaking into the field of gas engineering). The company's Treasurer was Wayne L. Thieme (son of prominent hosiery manufacturer, Theodore F. Thieme). Apartment 601 was designed and resided in by Sylvanus Bechtel (brother-in-law of inventor Sylvanus Bowser).

It was listed on the National Register of Historic Places in 1983.
