= Blackstone Building (Fort Wayne, Indiana) =

- U.S. National Register of Historic Places
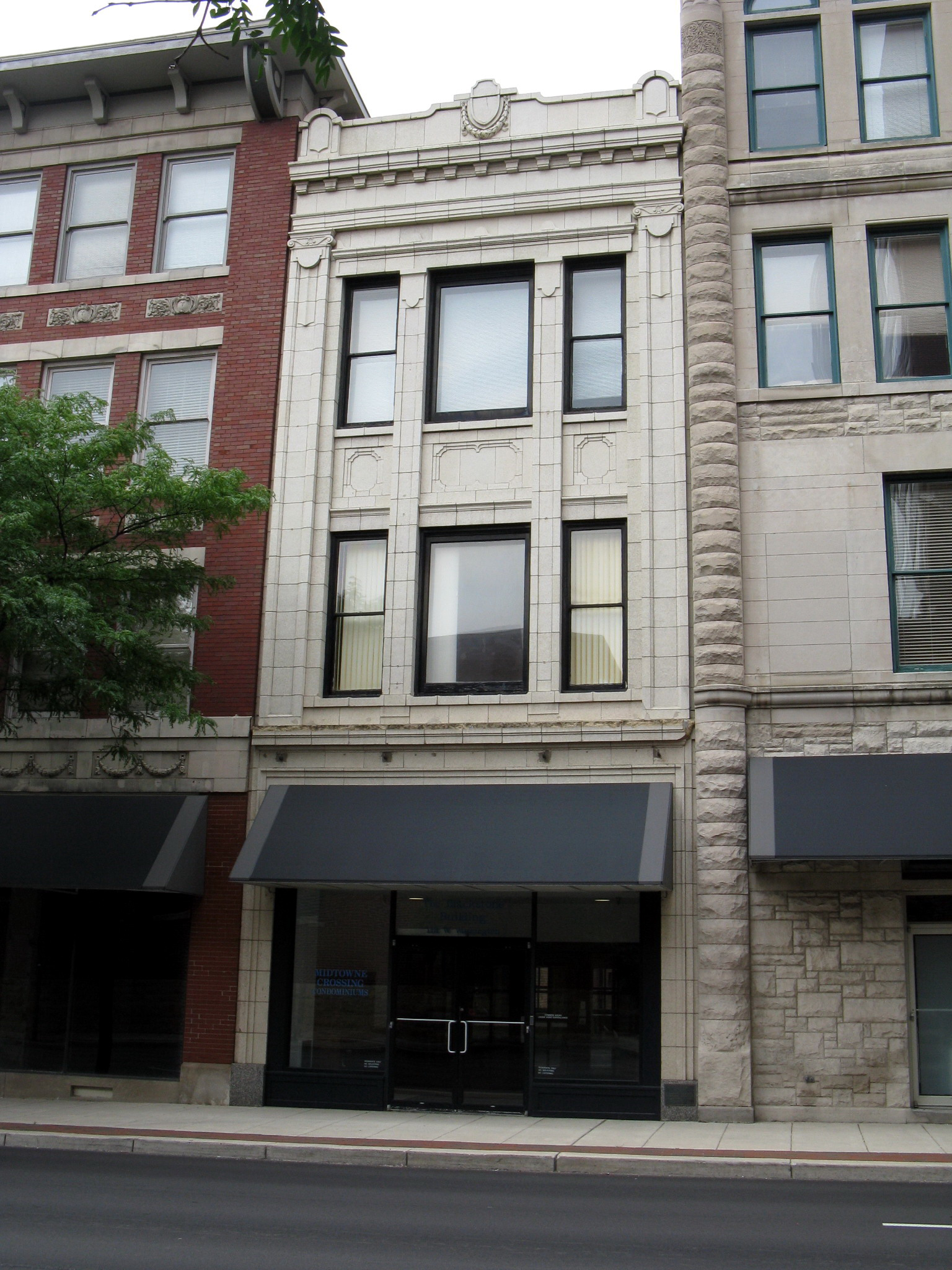
- Blackstone Building, July 2010

- Location within Indiana Location within the United States
- Location: 112 W. Washington, Fort Wayne, Indiana
- Coordinates: 41°4′22″N 85°8′1″W
- Area: less than one acre
- Built: 1927
- Architect: Weatherhogg, Charles R.
- Architectural style: Classical Revival
- NRHP reference No.: 88001219
- Added to NRHP: August 24, 1988

The Blackstone Building is a historic commercial building located in downtown Fort Wayne, Indiana. It was designed by noted Fort Wayne architect Charles R. Weatherhogg and built in 1927. It is a three-story, three-bay, Classical Revival style brick building. The front facade features panelled Ionic order pilasters topped by a modillion cornice and a shaped parapet. Its upper stories are clad in white terra cotta. The building originally housed the Blackstone Shop, an exclusive women's clothing store.

A wealthy local businessman, William H. Noll (a cough syrup manufacturer who also owned the first factory designed to mass-produce nail polish in the United States) funded the construction of the Blackstone Building. Noll owned the adjacent property, Schmitz Block. Weatherhogg had previously designed Noll's palatial home elsewhere in Fort Wayne. The Blackstone Building was constructed to house Blackstone Shop, a women's clothing store operated by William's wife, Laura Green Noll. Blackstone Shop occupied the building until 1937. In 1941, a men's clothing store, Harold Hughes, opened in the Blackstone Building. It was replaced by another women's clothing store, Nobbson, in 1951. Nobbson, which also occupied the first floor of Schmitz Block, closed their downtown location in 1979.

It was listed on the National Register of Historic Places in 1988.
