= University Courts Historic District =

Historic district in Indiana, United States

- U.S. National Register of Historic Places
- U.S. Historic district
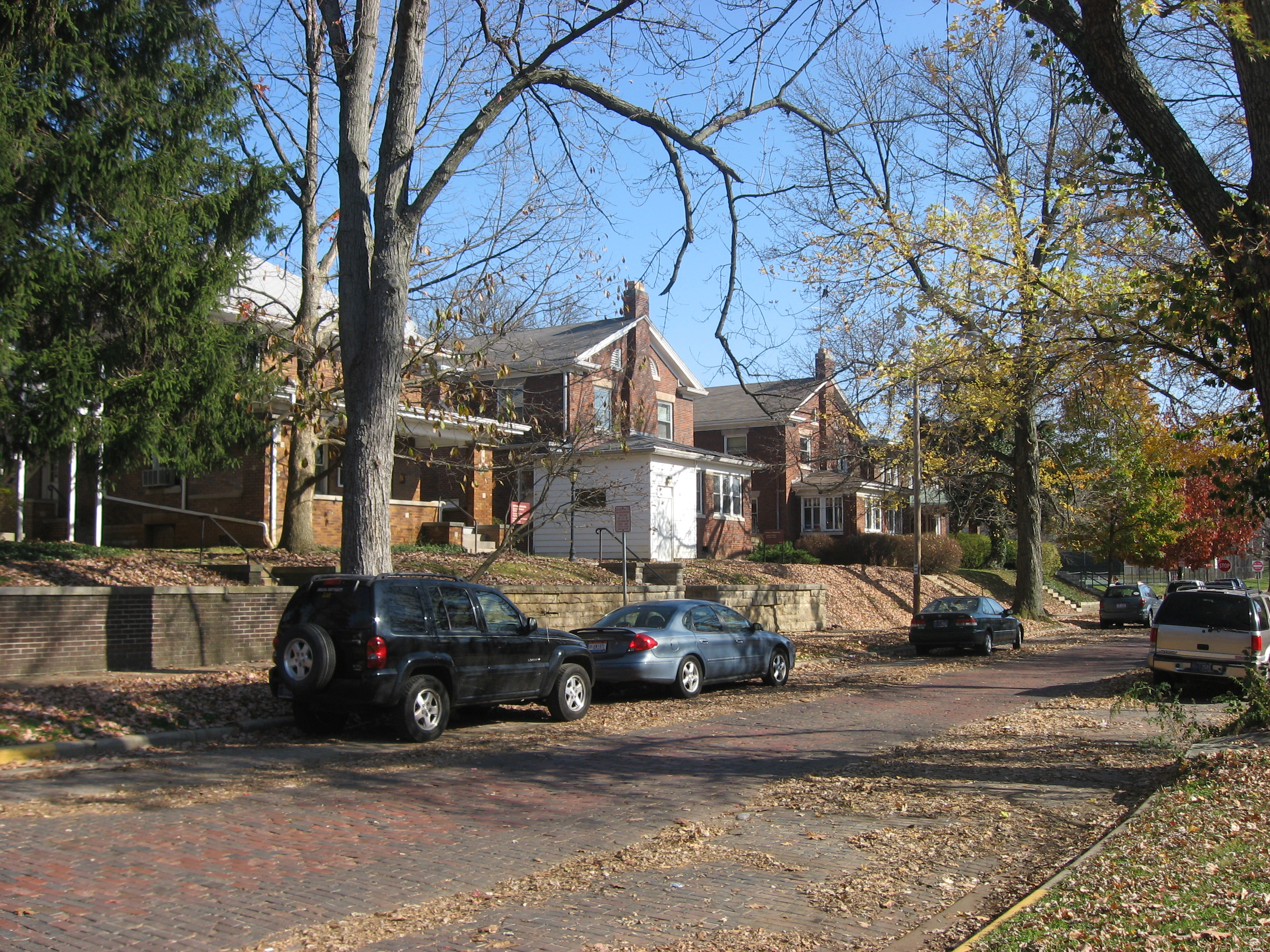
- Paving blocks on East Eight Street

- Location within Indiana Location within the United States
- Location: Roughly bounded by 7th St., Indiana Ave., 10th St. & Woodlawn Ave., Bloomington, Indiana
- Coordinates: 39°10′10.5″N 86°31′27″W
- Area: 20.1 acres (8.1 ha)
- Architect: John Nichols; Alfred Grindle; Burns & James; Edwin C. Doeppers & Co.; Merritt Harrison; Lowe & Bollenbacher; Nichols & Nichols
- Architectural style: Colonial Revival, Classical Revival, Craftsman, Tudor Revival
- NRHP reference No.: 07001308
- Added to NRHP: December 26, 2007

The University Courts Historic District is a historic district and neighborhood in Bloomington, Indiana, United States.

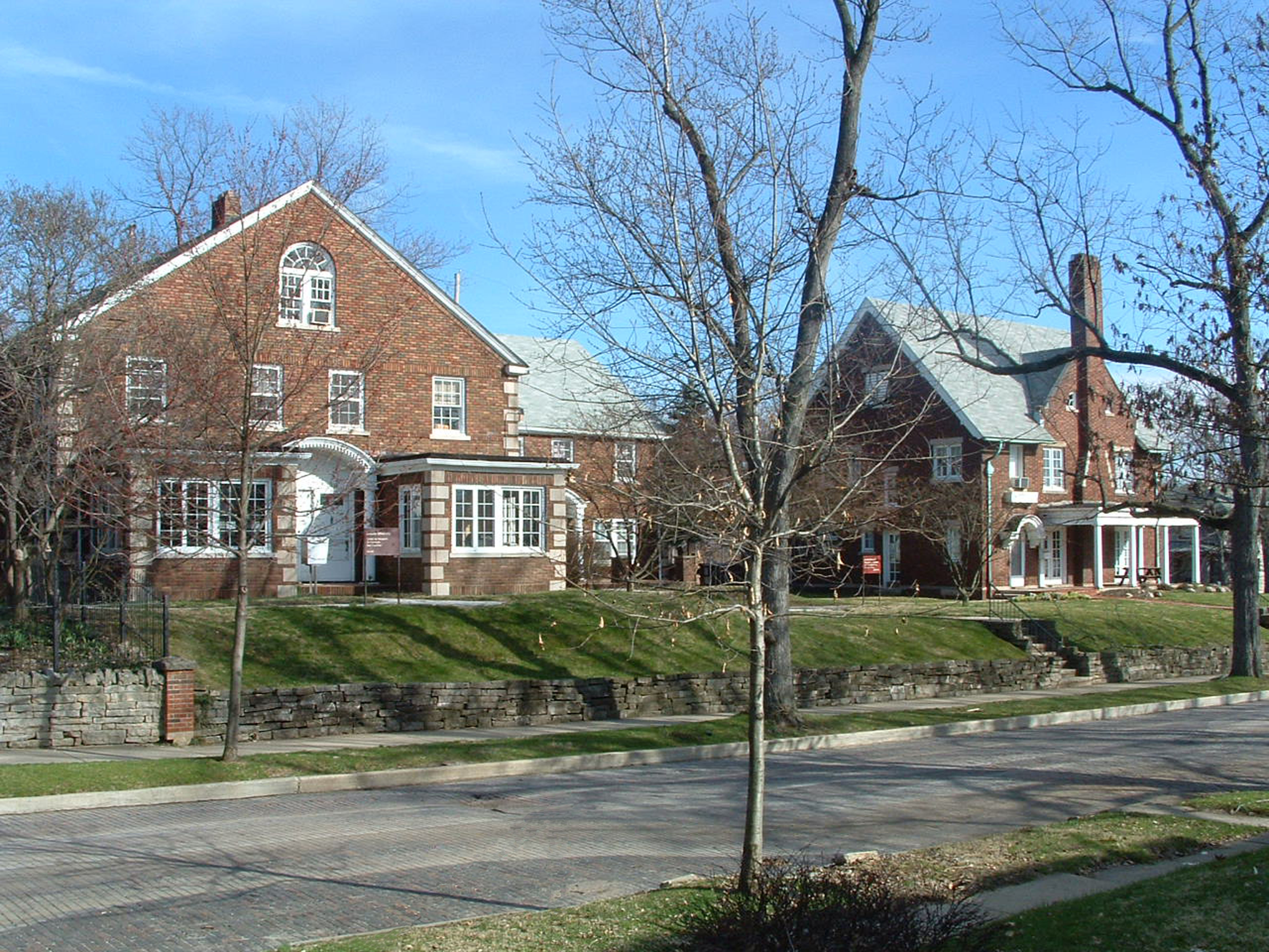
Two duplexes and a house clustered about a central courtyard

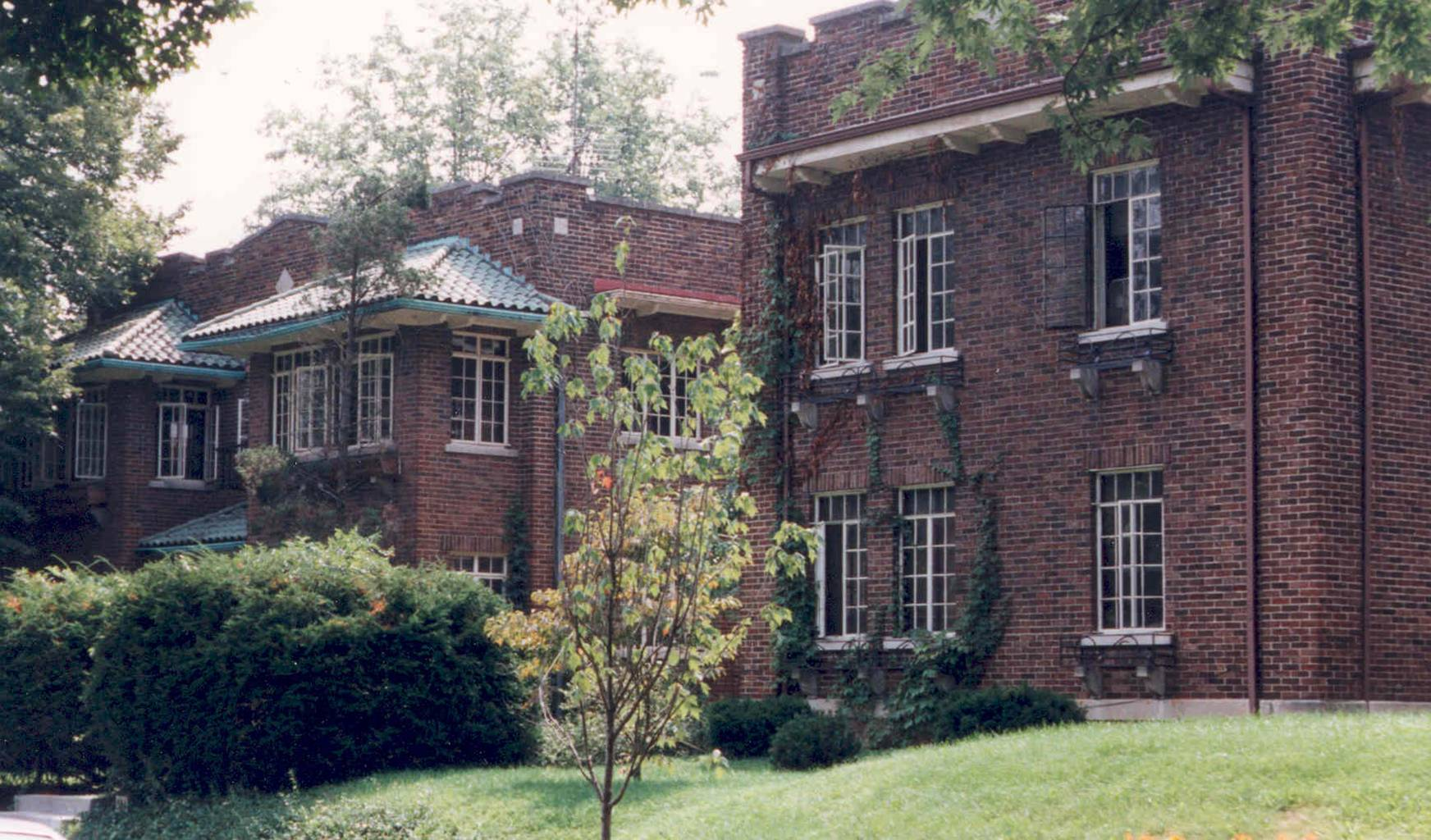
Harlos Apartments

== Greek houses ==
The Sigma Chi house at 601 E. Seventh Street, built in Free Classic style, was enlarged in 1925 by Granger, Lowe & Bollenbacher in a manner sympathetic to the original design.

The northeast corner of Indiana Avenue and Eighth Street was originally the site of a Tudor Revival house built by Maude Showers. Situated on three lots and designed by Carlisle Bollenbacher, the house was sold to Delta Tau Delta and used for a fraternity until destroyed by fire in February 1935. The fraternity rebuilt on the same site. The new house was designed by Burns & James and retained the same placement on the three lots as the original house. The general contractor was Charles A. Pike.

Delta Zeta at 809 East Seventh Street was designed by John Nichols in 1923 in the Classical Revival Style. The general contractor was Charles F. Johnson.

=== Demolished houses ===
Before the district was first nominated for the National Register, four houses on the east half of the block bounded by Indiana Avenue, Fess Avenue, Eighth Street and Ninth Street were demolished. Joseph Smith of the Showers Brothers furniture factory engaged John Nichols to build a two-story brick Colonial Revival house at 403 North Fess in 1914. J. Neill was the general contractor. Clarence Neill, general contractor, built a house for Charles F. Johnson at 421 North Fess in 1916. Edwin C. Doeppers and Company were the architects. Indiana University's Mathers Museum of World Cultures and the Glenn A. Black Laboratory of Archaeology now occupy those two lots, among others.

== Table of contributing properties ==
Appearing in the table below are the buildings included within the boundaries of the city-designated historic district.

Rating	Image	Address	Year	Style	Comments
Contributing		601 East Seventh Street; 39°10′6.68″N 86°31′37.03″W	1906	Georgian Revival	Chapter house for Sigma Chi
Notable		607 East Seventh Street; 39°10′8″N 86°31′33.6″W	1932	Gothic Revival	Designed by Alfred Grindle
Notable		703 East Seventh Street; 39°10′7″N 86°31′32″W	1915	Craftsman	
Notable		705 East Seventh Street; 39°10′7″N 86°31′31″W	1911	Spanish Colonial Revival Dormer Front Bungalow	Attorney Thomas J. Sare engaged architect John Nichols when he built this house.
Notable		715 East Seventh Street; 39°10′7″N 86°31′30″W	1925	Tudor Revival Craftsman	
Notable		719 East Seventh Street; 39°10′7″N 86°31′29.2″W	1924	Spanish Mission Revival	Attorney Thomas J. Sare engaged architect John Nichols when building this house.
Contributing		801 East Seventh Street; 39°10′7″N 86°31′28″W	1920	Tudor Revival	
Contributing		601 East Eighth Street; 39°10′10.8″N 86°31′36″W	1935	Georgian Revival	This building was designed by Indianapolis architects Burns & James and built by Charles A. Pike for Delta Tau Delta fraternity. Their previous house on this site was destroyed by fire.
Contributing		622-624 East Eighth Street; 39°10′9.3″N 86°31′33.″W	1916	Tudor Revival Craftsman	John T. Schuman built two duplexes at 8th and Fess (see 315-317 N. Fess Ave.). Edwin C. Doeppers was listed as architect.
Contributing		701 East Eighth Street; 39°10′10.8″N 86°31′32″W	1914	Prairie Style Foursquare	Built for Herman Grant by general contractor J. O. White. Edwin C. Doeppers was listed as architect in the construction press.
Contributing		707 East Eighth Street; 39°10′10.8″N 86°31′31.5″W	1922	Colonial Revival	John Nichols designed this house for Ward Johnson of Johnson Creamery.
Notable		712 East Eighth Street; 39°10′9.3″N 86°31′31″W	1916	California Bungalow	Architect John Nichols was engaged by Herman Bowman of the Bowman-King Stone Co. to build this house.
Contributing		713 East Eighth Street; 39°10′9.3″N 86°31′31″W	1916	Colonial Revival Foursquare	Dr. J. C. Vermilya engaged engineer Edwin C. Doeppers when building this house.
Contributing		715-717 East Eighth Street; 39°10′10.8″N 86°31′29.5″W	1915	Arts and Crafts	Originally built by Thomas J. Sare, who contracted with John Murphy for masonry and Alex Robinson for carpentry to build two duplexes at 8th & Park (see 405-407 N. Park Ave.). Nichols & Nichols were architects.
Contributing		718-720 East Eighth Street; 39°10′9.3″N 86°31′29.2″W	1924	Craftsman Foursquare	John Nichols was architect for this house built by general contractor J. O. White for Herman Bowman of Bowman-King Stone Co.
Contributing		802 East Eighth Street; 39°10′9.3″N 86°31′28″W	1930	Colonial Revival	
Contributing		803 East Eighth Street; 39°10′10.8″N 86°31′27.3″W	1913	Prairie Style Colonial Revival	Built by general contractor W. S. Delapp for Monroe County treasurer Joseph D. Hensley. Nichols & Nichols were the architects.
Contributing		804 East Eighth Street; 39°10′9.3″N 86°31′27.3″W	1930	Craftsman Front Gabled Bungalow	
Contributing		809 East Eighth Street; 39°10′10.8″N 86°31′26.4″W	1930	Colonial Revival	
Contributing		812 East Eighth Street; 39°10′9.3″N 86°31′26.5″W	1922	Carpenter Builder Cottage	
Contributing		815 East Eighth Street; 39°10′10.8″N 86°31′26″W	1923	Colonial Revival	Built by general contractor Joe Neill and Son for the jeweler Ray Wingert and his wife Leafy. John Nichols was architect.
Contributing		816-820 East Eighth Street; 39°10′9.3″N 86°31′26″W	1925	Craftsman American Foursquare	
Notable		825 East Eighth Street; 39°10′10.8″N 86°31′25.2″W	1921	Prairie Style	Alfred Grindle drew plans for Indiana University football coach Ewald O. Stiehm, who let contracts and supervised construction himself.
Contributing		708 East Ninth Street; 39°10′13″N 86°31′32″W	1930	Colonial Revival	
Contributing		710-712 East Ninth Street; 39°10′13″N 86°31′31.2″W	1930	Craftsman American Foursquare	
Contributing		714 East Ninth Street; 39°10′13″N 86°31′30.4″W	1916	Craftsman American Foursquare	Doeppers & Co. let contracts to Clarence Neill for masonry and George Torrence for carpentry when Willis Akins had this house built.
Contributing		716 East Ninth Street; 39°10′13″N 86°31′29.6″W	1930	Craftsman American Foursquare	
Contributing		801 East Ninth Street; 39°10′13.8″N 86°31′28″W	1920	Craftsman Cross Gable Bungalow	
Contributing		809 East Ninth Street; 39°10′13.8″N 86°31′27″W	1920	Craftsman	
Contributing		702 East Tenth Street; 39°10′17.4″N 86°31′32″W	1930	Colonial Revival	
Contributing		704 East Tenth Street; 39°10′17.4″N 86°31′31″W	1930	Dutch Colonial Revival	
Contributing		315-317 North Fess Avenue; 39°10′8.5″N 86°31′33.5″W	1916	Tudor Revival Craftsman	John T. Schuman built two duplexes at 8th and Fess (see 622-624 E. Eighth St.). Edwin C. Doeppers was listed as architect.
Contributing		406 North Fess Avenue; 39°10′11.6″N 86°31′32″W	1915	Bungalow Foursquare	Built by general contractor Val Hatfield as a rental property for Herman Grant (see 701 E. 8th). E. C. Doeppers and Company where the architects.
Contributing		422 North Fess Avenue; 39°10′13″N 86°31′32″W	1930	Colonial Revival	
Notable		504 North Fess Avenue; 39°10′14.5″N 86°31′32″W	1917	Colonial Revival Tudor Revival	Indianapolis architect Merritt Harrison designed this house for Indiana University professor Wm. F. Book.
Contributing		505 North Fess Avenue; 39°10′15″N 86°31′33.5″W	1920	Colonial Revival Foursquare	
Notable		506-508 North Fess Avenue; 39°10′15″N 86°31′32″W	1930	Colonial Revival	
Notable		509-513 North Fess Avenue; 39°10′15.5″N 86°31′33.5″W	1925	Spanish Colonial Revival	Designed by Cecil and Inez Harlos
Notable		510-512 North Fess Avenue; 39°10′15.6″N 86°31′32″W	1930	Colonial Revival	
Contributing		514 North Fess Avenue; 39°10′16″N 86°31′32″W	1930	Tudor Revival	
Notable		515 North Fess Avenue; 39°10′16″N 86°31′33.5″W	1925	Spanish Colonial Revival	Designed by Cecil and Inez Harlos
Contributing		516 North Fess Avenue; 39°10′16.5″N 86°31′32″W	1930	Colonial Revival	
Contributing		517 North Fess Avenue; 39°10′16.5″N 86°31′33.5″W	1925	Colonial Revival	Designed by John Nichols
Contributing		519 North Fess Avenue; 39°10′17″N 86°31′33.5″W	1915	Foursquare	
Contributing		520 North Fess Avenue; 39°10′17″N 86°31′32″W	1930	Colonial Revival	
Contributing		525 North Fess Avenue; 39°10′17.5″N 86°31′33.5″W	1920	Foursquare	
Contributing		422 North Indiana Avenue; 39°10′13.2″N 86°31′36.3″W	1912	Dutch Colonial Revival	The Chicago firm of Lowe & Bollenbacher drew plans for a residence for department store owner Wyatt W. Wicks, who originally intended to take bids himself. But, later John Nichols took bids for Wicks.
Contributing		502 North Indiana Avenue; 39°10′14″N 86°31′36.3″W	1915	Foursquare	
Contributing		506 North Indiana Avenue; 39°10′14.7″N 86°31′36.3″W	1913	Craftsman Foursquare	Built by general contractor J. O. White for Dr. A. M. Snyder. The firm of Nichols & Nichols was listed as the architect.
Contributing		309-311 North Park Avenue; 39°10′8″N 86°31′29.2″W	1924	Colonial Revival	This duplex was designed by Alfred Grindle for Allen Buskirk.
Contributing		310-312 North Park Avenue; 39°10′8″N 86°31′28″W	1924	Colonial Revival	Edwin C. Doeppers drew plans for Almer Henry, who originally intended to take bids himself. He later engaged John L. Nichols to take bids and supervise construction.
Contributing		402 North Park Avenue; 39°10′10.8″N 86°31′28″W	1920	Georgian Revival	
Notable		405-407 North Park Avenue; 39°10′11.6″N 86°31′29.2″W	1915	Craftsman Tudor Revival	Originally built by Thomas J. Sare, who contracted with John Murphy for masonry and Alex Robinson for carpentry to build two duplexes at 8th & Park (see 715-717 E. Eighth St.). Nichols & Nichols were architects.
Contributing		409 North Park Avenue; 39°10′12″N 86°31′29.2″W	1928	Tudor Revival English Cottage Revival	
Contributing		410 North Park Avenue; 39°10′12″N 86°31′28″W	1930	Colonial Revival	
Contributing		415 North Park Avenue; 39°10′12.6″N 86°31′29.2″W	1930	Colonial Revival	
Contributing		421 North Park Avenue; 39°10′13.2″N 86°31′29.2″W	1925	Craftsman Foursquare	
Contributing		501 North Park Avenue; 39°10′14″N 86°31′29.2″W	1922	Craftsman Bungalow	
Contributing		505 North Park Avenue; 39°10′14.5″N 86°31′29.2″W	1930	Colonial Revival American Foursquare	
Notable		513 North Park Avenue; 39°10′16″N 86°31′29.2″W	1926	Tudor Revival	
Notable		515 North Park Avenue; 39°10′16.5″N 86°31′29.2″W	1930	Colonial Revival	Designed by John L. Nichols
Contributing		521 North Park Avenue; 39°10′17″N 86°31′29.2″W	1920	Colonial Revival	
Contributing		525-527 North Park Avenue; 39°10′17.4″N 86°31′29.2″W	1925	American Foursquare	
Contributing		309 North Woodlawn Avenue; 39°10′8″N 86°31′25″W	1930	Colonial Revival	
Contributing		321 North Woodlawn Avenue; 39°10′9.3″N 86°31′25″W	1935	Colonial Revival	Originally named the O'Harrow House, it is now the Indiana University School of Journalism Annex.
Contributing		441 North Woodlawn Avenue; 39°10′9.3″N 86°31′25″W	1935	Tudor Revival	This building was designed by Indianapolis architects Burns & James and built by Charles A. Pike for Kappa Alpha Theta sorority.
