= Southwood Park Historic District =

Historic district in Indiana, United States

- U.S. National Register of Historic Places
- U.S. Historic district
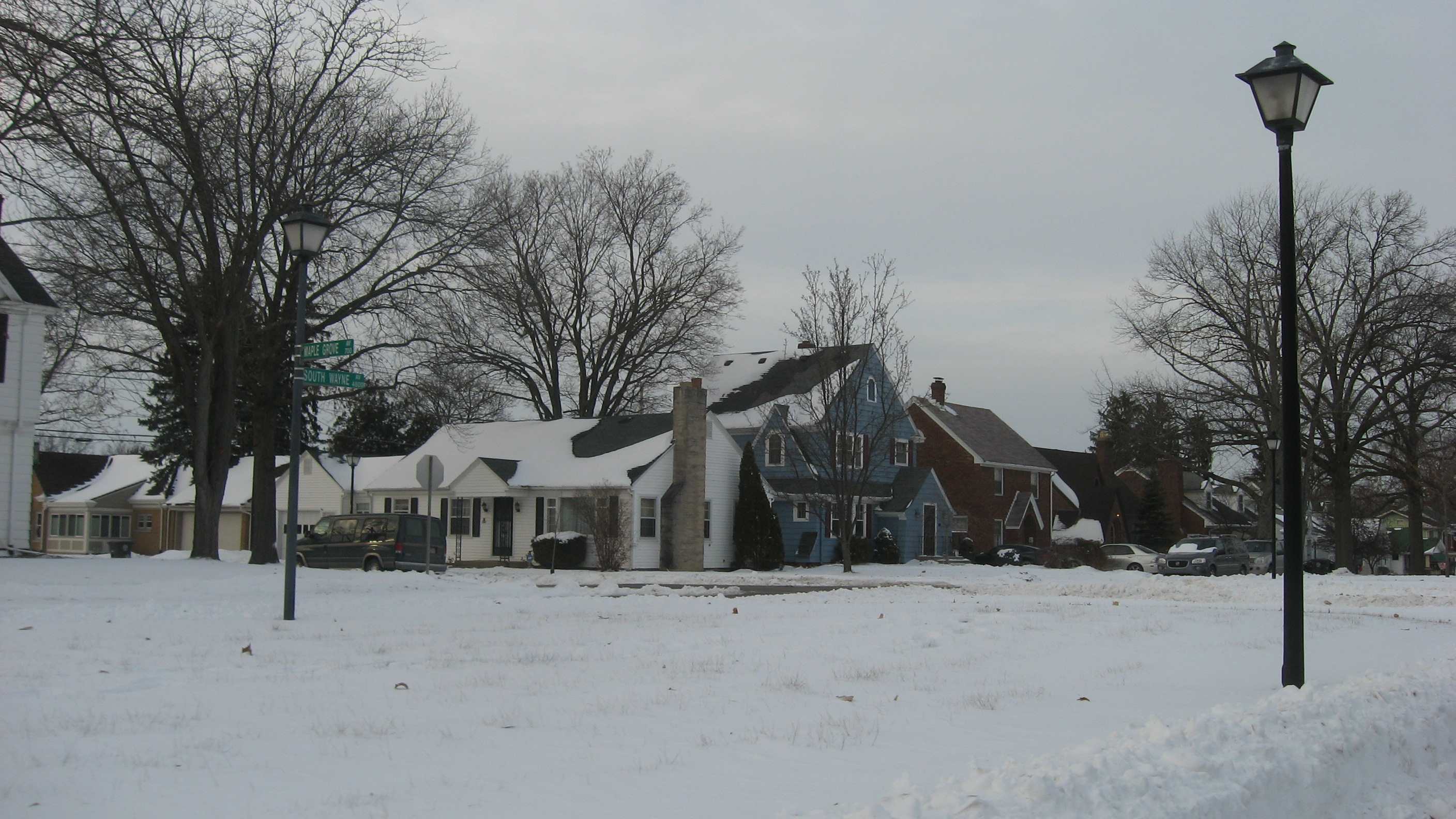
- Intersection of S. Wayne and W. Maple Grove Avenues, Southwood Park Historic District, January 2014

- Location within Indiana Location within the United States
- Location: Bounded by W. Pettit Ave., Stratford Rd., W. Sherwood Terrace, Hartman Rd., Lexington Ave., Indiana Ave., Fort Wayne, Indiana
- Coordinates: 41°02′31″N 85°08′57″W
- Area: 320 acres (130 ha)
- Built: 1917
- Architect: Schaaf, Albert H.
- Architectural style: Late 19th And 20th Century Revivals, Late 19th And Early 20th Century American Movements
- MPS: Historic Residential Suburbs in the United States, 1830-1960 MPS
- NRHP reference No.: 09001126
- Added to NRHP: December 22, 2009

Southwood Park Historic District is a national historic district located at Fort Wayne, Indiana. The district encompasses 1,889 contributing buildings, 1 contributing site, 4 contributing structures, and 1 contributing object in a predominantly residential section of Fort Wayne. The area was developed between about 1906 and 1965, and includes notable examples of Colonial Revival, Tudor Revival, Mission Revival, and Bungalow / American Craftsman style residential architecture. Its development is directly related to the implementation of the 1912 plan for Parks and Boulevards for the city of Fort Wayne by city planner and landscape architect George Kessler.

Notable buildings include the Hutson Drug Store, Hoosier Foods Store, Gollers Dry Cleaning building, First Missionary Church (c. 1920), St. John the Baptist Catholic Church complex, and Missionary Church World Headquarters (c. 1950).

It was listed on the National Register of Historic Places in 2009.
