= Alfred Grindle =

British-born architect in the United States

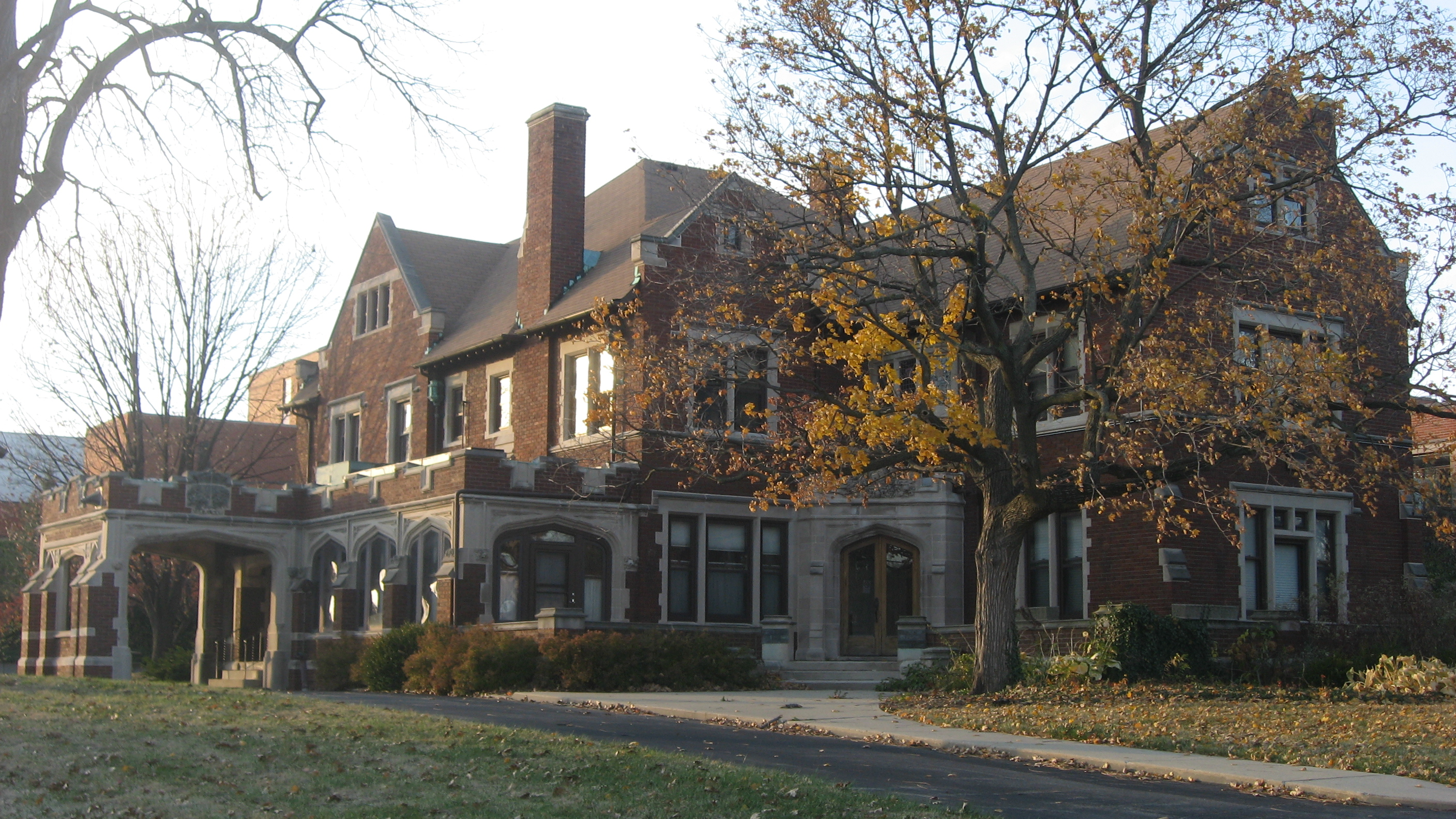
Glossbrenner Mansion

Alfred Grindle was a Manchester-born architect. active in Indiana in the United States. His work includes the Glossbrenner Mansion (1910) at 3202 North Meridian Street in Indianapolis.

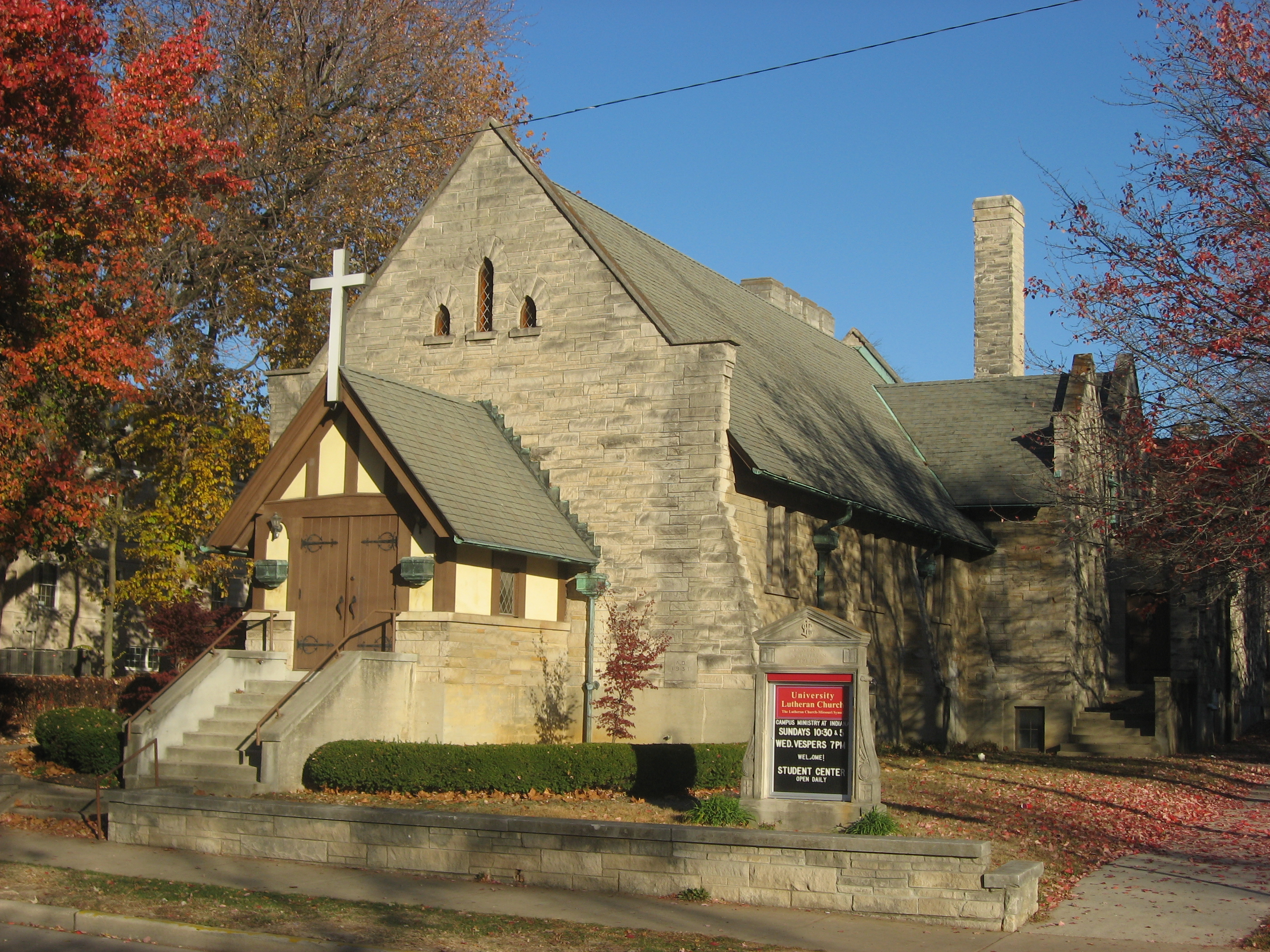
University Lutheran Church, University Courts at 607 East Seventh Street (Gothic Revival architecture)

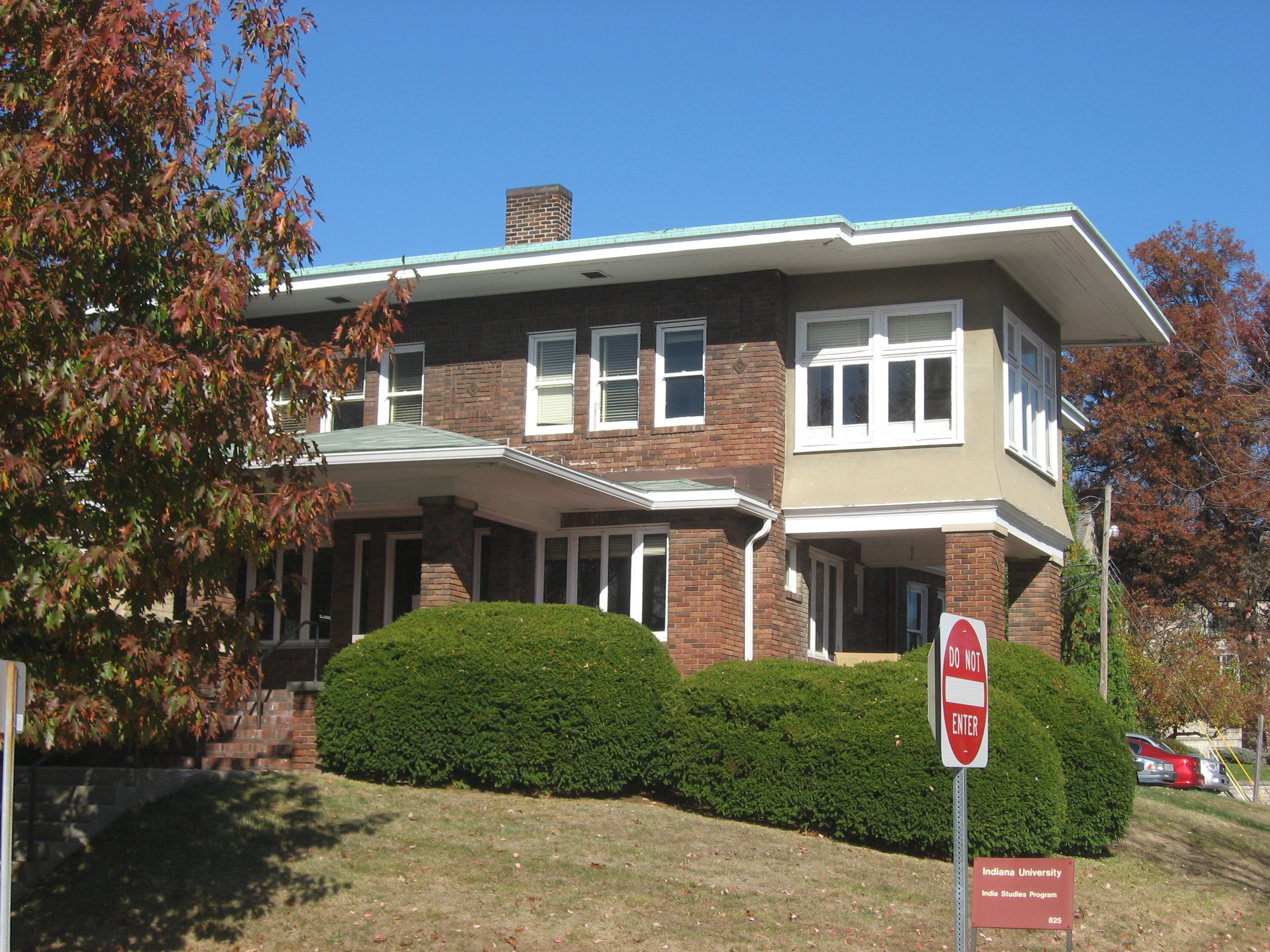
825 East Eighth Street, India Studies Program, University Courts (1921) Prairie Style

Grindle designed several buildings in the University Courts Historic District in Bloomington, Indiana. He drew plans for 825 East Eighth Street for Indiana University football coach Ewald O. Stiehm, who let contracts and supervised construction himself.

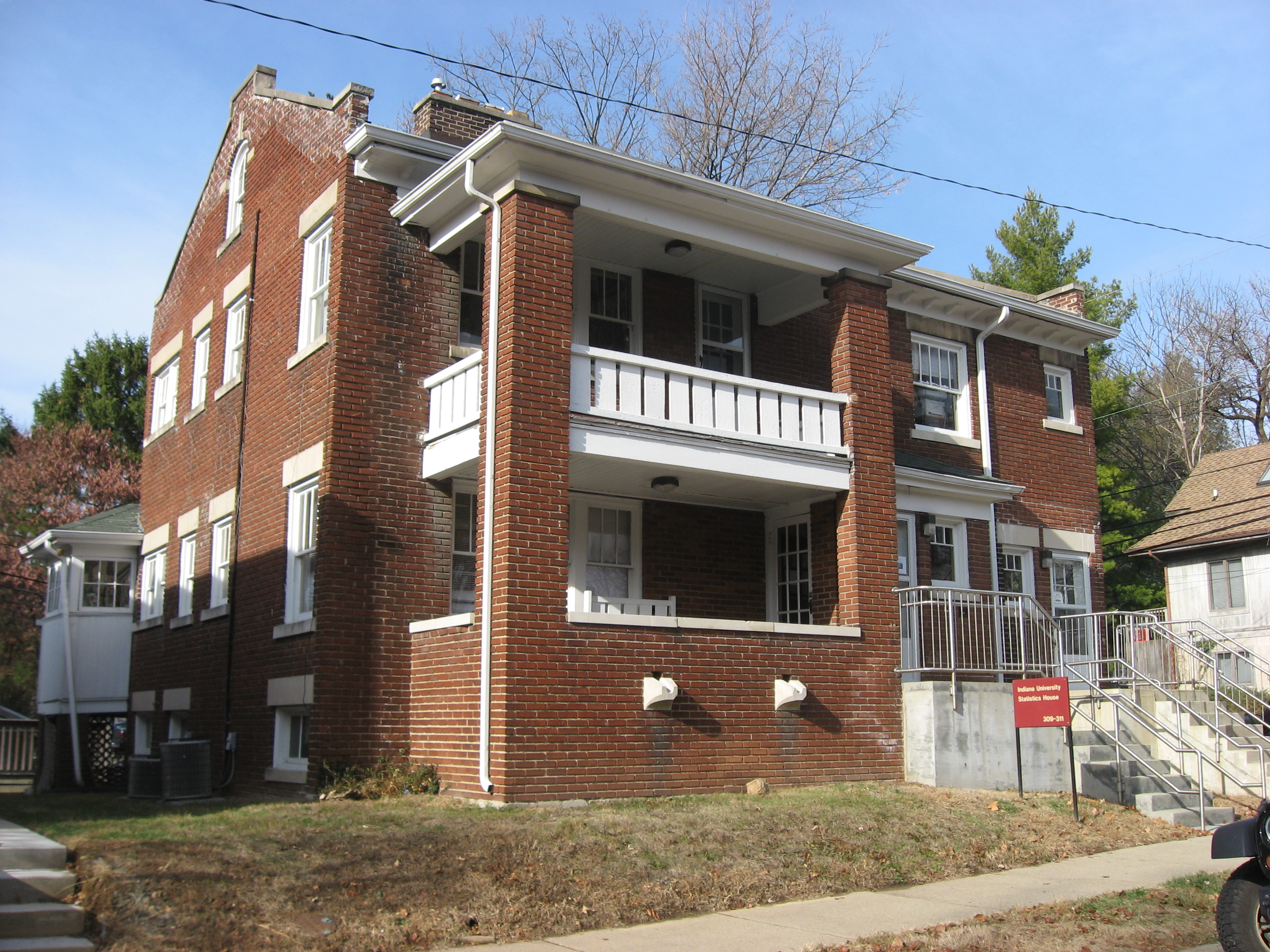
309-311 North Park Avenue, Indiana University Statistics House, (1924) Colonial Revival architecture University Courts, designed by Alfred Grindle for Allen Buskirk.
