= Schmitz Block =

- U.S. National Register of Historic Places
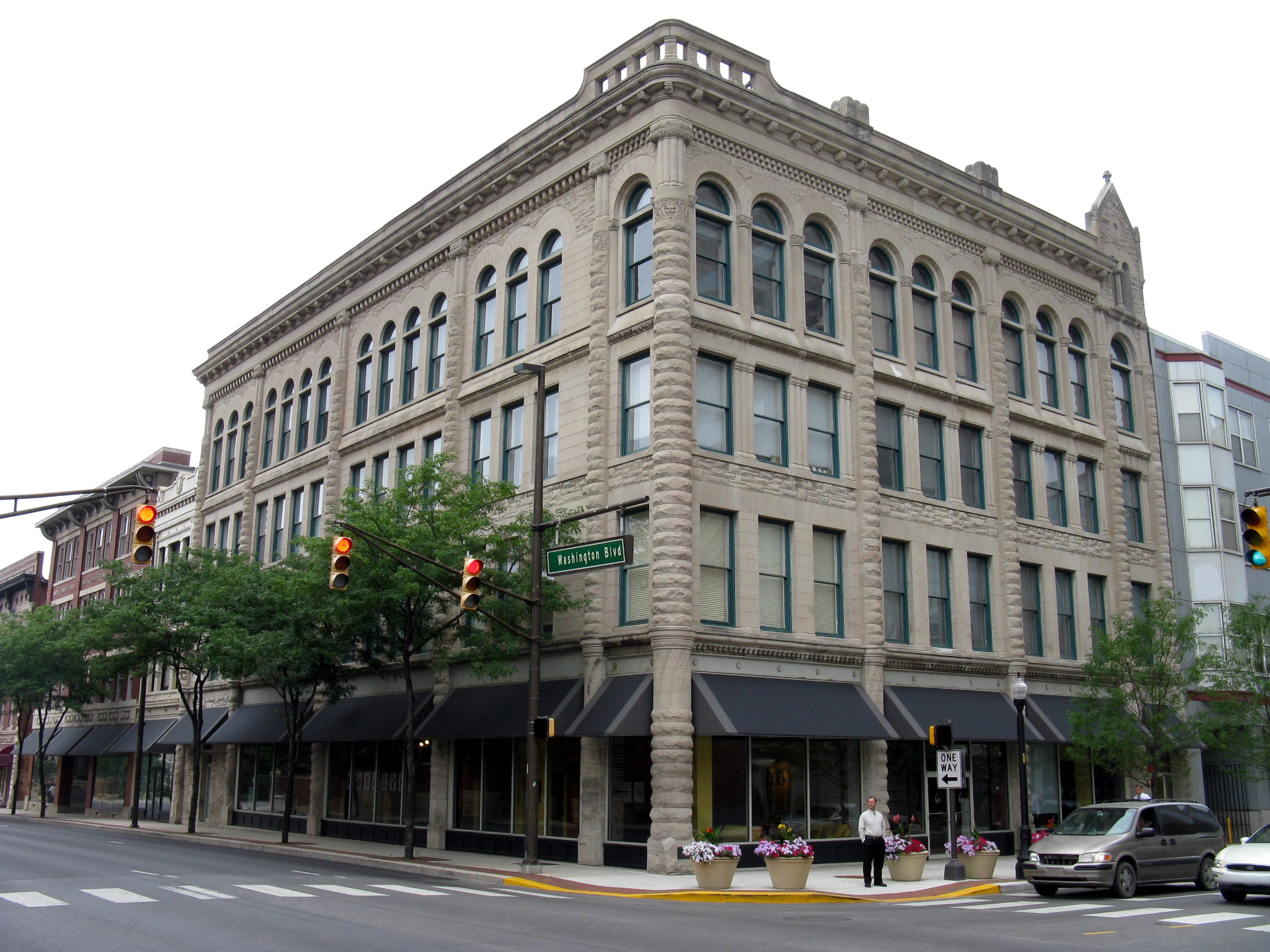
- Schmitz Block, July 2010

- Location within Indiana Location within the United States
- Location: 926-930 S. Calhoun St., Fort Wayne, Indiana
- Coordinates: 41°4′39″N 85°8′21″W
- Area: less than one acre
- Built: 1888, c. 1912
- Architect: Kendrick, Frank B.
- Architectural style: Richardsonian Romanesque
- NRHP reference No.: 88001224
- Added to NRHP: August 26, 1988

Schmitz Block, also known as the Noll Block, is a historic commercial building located in downtown Fort Wayne, Indiana. It was built in 1888, and is a four-story, L-shaped, Richardsonian Romanesque style brick building clad entirely in cut limestone. It features round rock-faced piers which extend the full height of the building and round arch windows. It was remodeled about 1912 after bring purchased by William F. Noll. For many years the building housed Hutner's Paris and Nobbson, a women's clothing store.

It was listed on the National Register of Historic Places in 1988.
