= National Register of Historic Places listings in DeKalb County, Indiana =

Location of DeKalb County in Indiana

This is a list of the National Register of Historic Places listings in DeKalb County, Indiana.

This is intended to be a complete list of the properties and districts on National Register of Historic Places in DeKalb County, Indiana, United States. Latitude and longitude coordinates are provided for many National Register properties and districts; these locations may be seen together in a map.

There are 29 properties and districts listed on the National Register in the county, including one National Historic Landmark.

Properties and districts located in incorporated areas display the name of the municipality, while properties and districts in unincorporated areas display the name of their civil township. Properties and districts split between multiple jurisdictions display the names of all jurisdictions.

This National Park Service list is complete through NPS recent listings posted August 29, 2025.

== Current listings ==
	Name on the Register	Image	Date listed	Location	City or town	Description
1	Auburn Community Mausoleum	Auburn Community Mausoleum	March 24, 2014 (#14000069)	1431 Center St. 41°21′24″N 85°02′58″W	Auburn	
2	Auburn Cord Duesenberg Automobile Facility	Auburn Cord Duesenberg Automobile Facility	September 21, 1978 (#78000029)	1600 S. Wayne St. 41°21′21″N 85°03′26″W	Auburn	
3	Samuel Bevier House	Samuel Bevier House	May 6, 1983 (#83000014)	County Roads 11 and 52, south of Garrett; 41°20′13″N 85°08′15″W	Keyser Township	
4	Joseph Bowman Farmhouse	Joseph Bowman Farmhouse	May 6, 1983 (#83000013)	County Roads 19 and 40, northeast of Garrett; 41°22′52″N 85°05′55″W	Keyser Township	
5	Breechbill-Davidson House	Breechbill-Davidson House	May 6, 1983 (#83000012)	State Road 8 and County Road 7, northwest of Garrett; 41°22′02″N 85°09′21″W	Keyser Township	
6	Brethren in Christ Church	Brethren in Christ Church	May 6, 1983 (#83000011)	County Road 7, northwest of Garrett; 41°22′11″N 85°09′18″W	Keyser Township	
7	Butler Community Mausoleum	Butler Community Mausoleum	March 25, 2014 (#14000070)	County Road 28 E., east of Butler; 41°25′49″N 84°50′59″W	Stafford Township	
8	Orin Clark House	Orin Clark House	May 6, 1983 (#83000010)	County Roads 3 and 48, west of Garrett; 41°21′03″N 85°10′34″W	Keyser Township	
9	William Cornell Homestead	William Cornell Homestead	August 14, 1973 (#73000015)	Southwest of Auburn off State Road 427; 41°16′44″N 85°05′28″W	Butler Township	
10	DeKalb County Home and Barn	DeKalb County Home and Barn	May 6, 1983 (#83000015)	County Road 40, northeast of Garrett; 41°22′54″N 85°04′59″W	Keyser Township	
11	Downtown Auburn Historic District	Downtown Auburn Historic District	September 10, 1986 (#86002858)	Roughly bounded by E. and W. 4th, N. and S. Cedar, E. 12th, and N. and S. Jackson Sts. 41°22′00″N 85°03′18″W	Auburn	
12	Downtown Butler Historic District	Downtown Butler Historic District	December 7, 2001 (#01001347)	Roughly the 100 and 200 blocks of S. Broadway; 41°25′45″N 84°52′18″W	Butler	
13	Eckhart Public Library and Park	Eckhart Public Library and Park	November 20, 1981 (#81000009)	603 S. Jackson St. 41°21′50″N 85°03′27″W	Auburn	
14	William Fountain House	William Fountain House	May 6, 1983 (#83000021)	State Road 8, northwest of Garrett; 41°21′58″N 85°10′38″W	Keyser Township	
15	Garrett Community Mausoleum	Garrett Community Mausoleum	March 25, 2014 (#14000071)	S. Hamsher St. 41°20′43″N 85°08′38″W	Garrett	
16	Garrett Historic District	Garrett Historic District	May 6, 1983 (#83000121)	Roughly bounded by Railroad, Britton, Warfield, and Hamsher Sts., and 3rd Ave. 41°20′43″N 85°08′06″W	Garrett	
17	Gump House	Gump House	May 6, 1983 (#83000020)	State Road 8, northwest of Garrett; 41°21′58″N 85°11′23″W	Keyser Township	
18	J.H. Haag House	J.H. Haag House	May 6, 1983 (#83000019)	County Road 54; 41°19′46″N 85°08′08″W	Garrett	
19	Edward Kelham House	Edward Kelham House	May 6, 1983 (#83000018)	County Road 48, west of Garrett; 41°21′07″N 85°11′20″W	Keyser Township	
20	Keyser Township School 8	Keyser Township School 8	May 6, 1983 (#83000017)	E. Quincy St. 41°21′06″N 85°07′03″W	Garrett	
21	Charles Lehmback Farmstead	Charles Lehmback Farmstead	May 6, 1983 (#83000016)	County Road 15, east of Garrett; 41°20′37″N 85°07′01″W	Keyser Township	
22	Mountz House	Mountz House	September 11, 1979 (#79000013)	507 E. Houston St. 41°20′53″N 85°07′49″W	Garrett	
23	Henry Peters House	Henry Peters House	May 6, 1983 (#83000022)	201 N. 6th St. 41°21′06″N 85°07′11″W	Garrett	
24	Rakestraw House	Rakestraw House	May 6, 1983 (#83000024)	County Road 19, northeast of Garrett; 41°22′11″N 85°05′54″W	Keyser Township	
25	Henry Shull Farmhouse Inn	Henry Shull Farmhouse Inn	May 6, 1983 (#83000023)	County Road 11-A, southeast of Garrett; 41°19′36″N 85°05′23″W	Keyser Township	
26	Spencerville Covered Bridge	Spencerville Covered Bridge	April 2, 1981 (#81000010)	County Road 68 at Spencerville; 41°16′53″N 84°54′53″W	Spencer Township	
27	Waterloo Community Mausoleum	Waterloo Community Mausoleum	March 25, 2014 (#14000072)	N. Center St. 41°26′14″N 85°01′23″W	Waterloo	
28	John Wilderson House	John Wilderson House	May 6, 1983 (#83000025)	1349 S. Cowen St. 41°20′01″N 85°08′12″W	Garrett	
29	Maria and Franklin Wiltrout Polygonal Barn	Maria and Franklin Wiltrout Polygonal Barn	April 2, 1993 (#93000183)	0209 County Road 16, northwest of Corunna; 41°28′04″N 85°11′02″W	Fairfield Township	

== See also ==
- List of National Historic Landmarks in Indiana
- National Register of Historic Places listings in Indiana
- Listings in neighboring counties: Allen, Defiance (OH), LaGrange, Noble, Steuben, Williams (OH)
- List of Indiana state historical markers in DeKalb County
