= List of Indiana state historical markers in DeKalb County =

Location of DeKalb County in Indiana

This is a list of the Indiana state historical markers in DeKalb County.

This is intended to be a complete list of the official state historical markers placed in DeKalb County, Indiana, United States by the Indiana Historical Bureau. The locations of the historical markers and their latitude and longitude coordinates are included below when available, along with their names, years of placement, and topics as recorded by the Historical Bureau. There are 7 historical markers located in DeKalb County.

== Historical markers ==
Marker title	Image	Year placed	Location	Topics
Auburn Automobile Company		1992	1600 S. Wayne Street at Gordon M. Buchrig Place at the Auburn-Cord-Duesenberg Museum in Auburn; 41°21′21″N 85°3′26″W	Transportation, Business, Industry, and Labor
Spencerville Covered Bridge		1996	Junction of County Roads 57 and 68 over the St. Joseph River at Spencerville; 41°16′53″N 84°54′52″W	Transportation, Buildings and Architecture
Creek Chub Bait Company		2017	113 East Keyser Street, Garrett	Business, Industry & Labor; Women
William Jacob Cuppy		2019	407 S. Jackson St. in Auburn; 41°21′53″N 85°03′25″W	Arts and Culture
John Bowersox (Bowers)		2021	Cowen St., Garrett; 41°20′59″N 85°08′12″W	Arts & Culture
Sechler's Pickles		2022	Sechler's Pickles, 5686 IN-1, St Joe; 41°19′38″N 84°53′14″W	Agriculture, Immigration
Jane L. (Brooks) Hine		2023	300 S. Wayne St., Waterloo; 41°25′45″N 85°01′11″W	Women; Science, Medicine & Invention; Nature

== See also ==
- List of Indiana state historical markers
- National Register of Historic Places listings in DeKalb County, Indiana
