= Altona, Indiana =

- Town
- Location of Altona in DeKalb County, Indiana.
- Coordinates: 41°21′08″N 85°09′09″W
- Country: United States
- State: Indiana
- County: DeKalb
- Township: Keyser
- Incorporated: 1906

Area
  - Total: 0.20 sq mi (0.53 km^{2})
  - Land: 0.20 sq mi (0.53 km^{2})
  - Water: 0 sq mi (0.00 km^{2})
- Elevation: 883 ft (269 m)

Population (2020)
  - Total: 213
  - Density: 1,050.7/sq mi (405.67/km^{2})
- Time zone: UTC−5 (EST)
  - Summer (DST): UTC−5 (EST)
- ZIP code: 46738
- Area code: 260
- FIPS code: 18-01288
- GNIS ID: 2397426

Altona is a town in Keyser Township, DeKalb County, Indiana, United States. The population was 213 at the 2020 census.

== History ==
Incorporated in 1906. A post office was established at Altona in 1874, and remained in operation until it was discontinued in 1913.

== Geography ==
Altona borders the larger city of Garrett.

According to the 2010 census, Altona has a total area of 0.22 square miles (0.57 km^{2}), all land.

== Demographics ==
Historical population
Census	Pop.	Note	%±
1880	100		—
1910	349		—
1920	382		9.5%
1930	342		−10.5%
1940	340		−0.6%
1950	344		1.2%
1960	313		−9.0%
1970	269		−14.1%
1980	263		−2.2%
1990	156		−40.7%
2000	198		26.9%
2010	197		−0.5%
2020	213		8.1%
U.S. Decennial Census

=== 2010 census ===
As of the 2010 census, there were 197 people, 90 households, and 45 families living in the town. The population density was 895.5 inhabitants per square mile (345.8/km^{2}). There were 98 housing units at an average density of 445.5 per square mile (172.0/km^{2}). The racial makeup of the town was 98.5% White, 0.5% Native American, and 1.0% from two or more races. Hispanic or Latino of any race were 1.0% of the population.

There were 90 households, of which 24.4% had children under the age of 18 living with them, 40.0% were married couples living together, 5.6% had a female householder with no husband present, 4.4% had a male householder with no wife present, and 50.0% were non-families. 46.7% of all households were made up of individuals, and 17.7% had someone living alone who was 65 years of age or older. The average household size was 2.19 and the average family size was 3.24.

The median age in the town was 41.1 years. 20.3% of residents were under the age of 18; 8.7% were between the ages of 18 and 24; 26.9% were from 25 to 44; 26.4% were from 45 to 64, and 17.8% were 65 years of age or older. The gender makeup of the town was 51.8% male and 48.2% female.

=== 2000 census ===
As of the 2000 census, there were 198 people, 89 households, and 50 families living in the town. The population density was 787.2 inhabitants per square mile (303.9/km^{2}). There were 90 housing units at an average density of 357.8 per square mile (138.1/km^{2}). The racial makeup of the town was 98.99% White, 0.51% African American, and 0.51% from two or more races. Hispanic or Latino of any race were 1.01% of the population.

There were 89 households, out of which 22.5% had children under the age of 18 living with them, 41.6% were married couples living together, 12.4% had a female householder with no husband present, and 43.8% were non-families. 39.3% of all households were made up of individuals, and 19.1% had someone living alone who was 65 years of age or older. The average household size was 2.22 and the average family size was 3.00.

In the town, the population was spread out, with 21.2% under the age of 18, 11.6% from 18 to 24, 25.8% from 25 to 44, 23.2% from 45 to 64, and 18.2% who were 65 years of age or older. The median age was 37 years. For every 100 females, there were 106.3 males. For every 100 females age 18 and over, there were 102.6 males.

The median income for a household in the town was $28,958, and the median income for a family was $36,042. Males had a median income of $25,833 versus $26,429 for females. The per capita income for the town was $18,530. About 9.4% of families and 12.1% of the population were below the poverty line, including 26.5% of those under the age of eighteen and 4.7% of those sixty-five or over.
