= Brethren in Christ Church (Garrett, Indiana) =

Historic church in Indiana, United States

- U.S. National Register of Historic Places
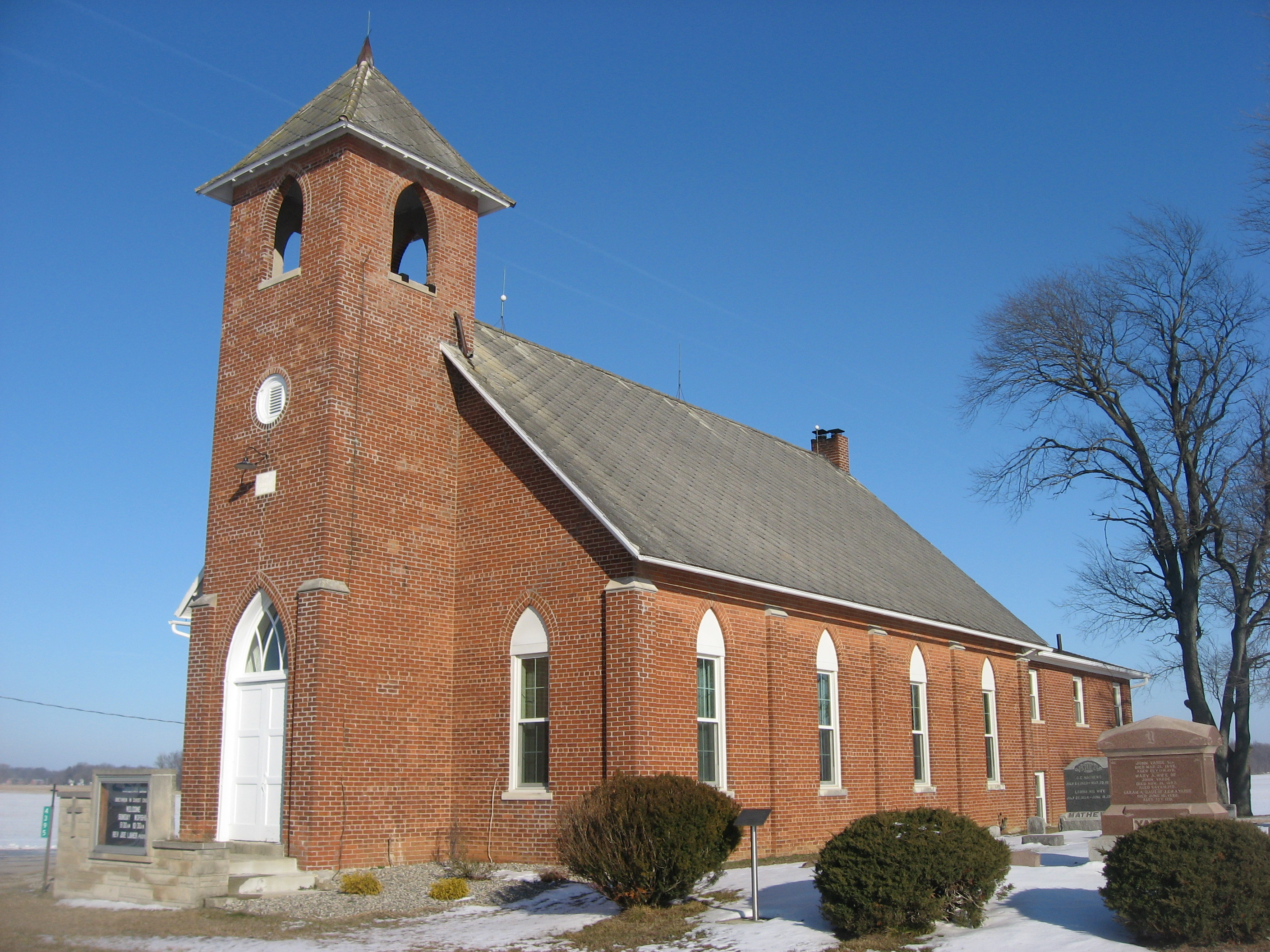

- Location within Indiana Location within the United States
- Location: County Road 7, northwest of Garrett, Keyser Township, DeKalb County, Indiana
- Coordinates: 41°22′12″N 85°9′18″W
- Area: less than one acre
- Built: 1882
- Architectural style: Gothic Revival
- MPS: Keyser Township MRA
- NRHP reference No.: 83000011
- Added to NRHP: May 6, 1983

Brethren in Christ Church is a historic Brethren church located near Garrett in Keyser Township, DeKalb County, Indiana. It was built in 1882 and is a Gothic Revival-style brick building. It consists of a one-and-a-half-story nave with a two-story central bell tower. The tower features an oculus window and bell-cast hipped roof. It is located adjacent to the historic Breechbill-Davidson House.

It was added to the National Register of Historic Places in 1983. It is currently owned and operated by the Brethren in Christ Church.
