= Kelham (surname) =

Kelham is a surname. Notable people with the surname include:

- George W. Kelham (1871–1936), American architect
- James Kelham (1796–1882), New Zealand businessman and politician
- Robert Kelham (1717–1808), English attorney and legal antiquary
- Christopher Kelham, British film actor and producer
- Edward Kelham, namesake of the historic Edward Kelham Home in DeKalb County, Indiana.
