= Rakestraw =

Rakestraw is a surname. Notable people with the surname include:

- Ennis Rakestraw Jr. (born 2002), American football player
- Frederick Rakestraw (1923–2004), Justice of the Indiana Supreme Court
- Larry Rakestraw (1942–2019), American football player
- Paulette Rakestraw (born 1967), American politician from the state of Georgia
- Wilbur Rakestraw (1928–2014), American racing driver

== See also ==
- Rakestraw House, a historic home located near Garrett in Keyser Township, DeKalb County, Indiana.
