= Charles Lehmback Farmstead =

Historic house in Indiana, United States

- U.S. National Register of Historic Places
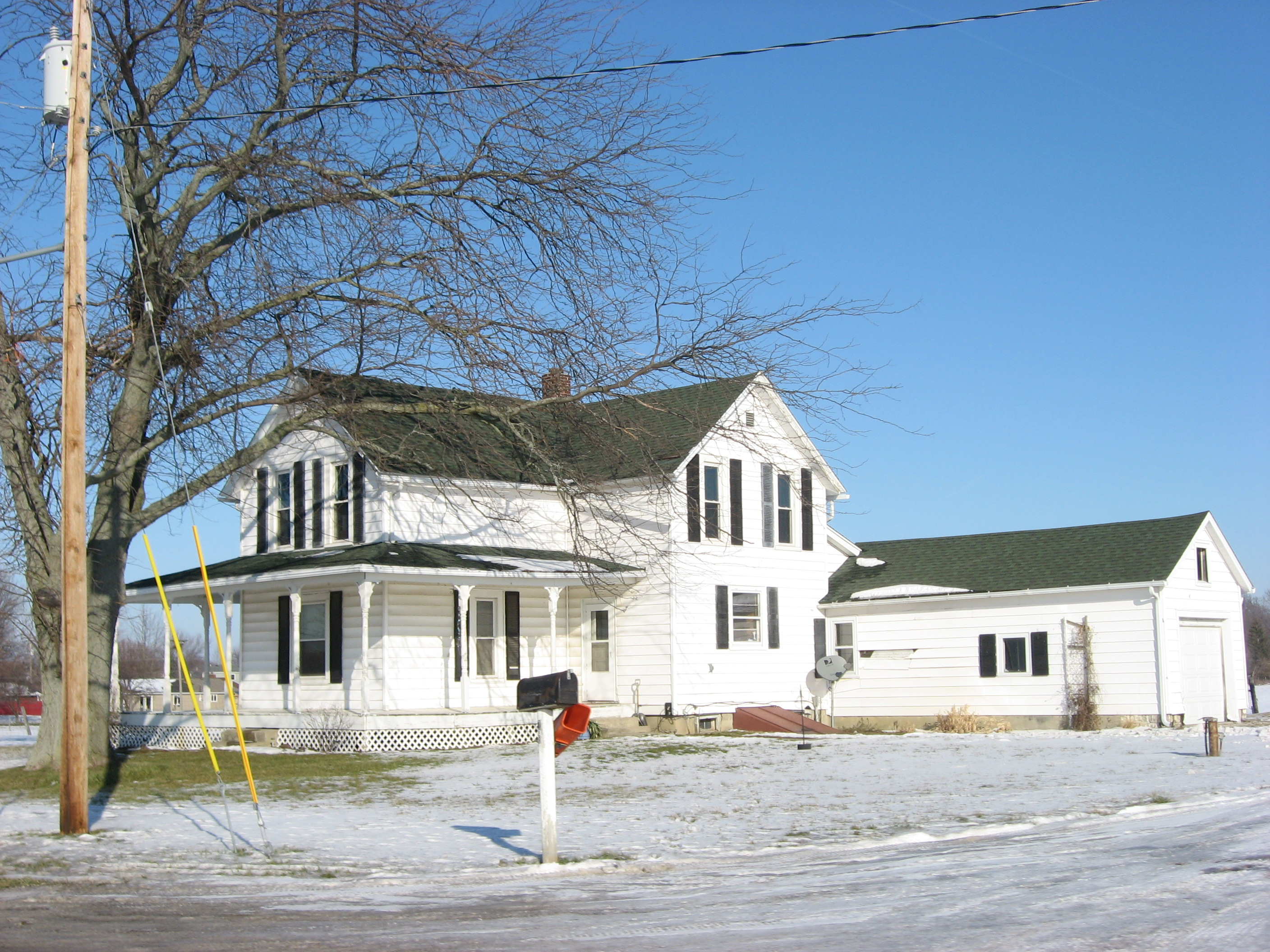
- Charles Lehmback Farmstead, January 2013

- Location within Indiana Location within the United States
- Location: County Road 15, east of Garrett, Keyser Township, DeKalb County, Indiana
- Coordinates: 41°20′36″N 85°7′1″W
- Area: less than one acre
- Built: 1911
- Architectural style: Queen Anne, Cottage Form
- MPS: Keyser Township MRA
- NRHP reference No.: 83000016
- Added to NRHP: May 6, 1983

Charles Lehmback Farmstead is a historic home located near Garrett in Keyser Township, DeKalb County, Indiana. It was built in 1911, and is a two-story, Queen Anne-style frame dwelling with a one-story shed roofed addition. It has a one-story wraparound porch.

It was added to the National Register of Historic Places in 1983.
