= Joseph Bowman Farmhouse =

Historic house in Indiana, United States

- U.S. National Register of Historic Places
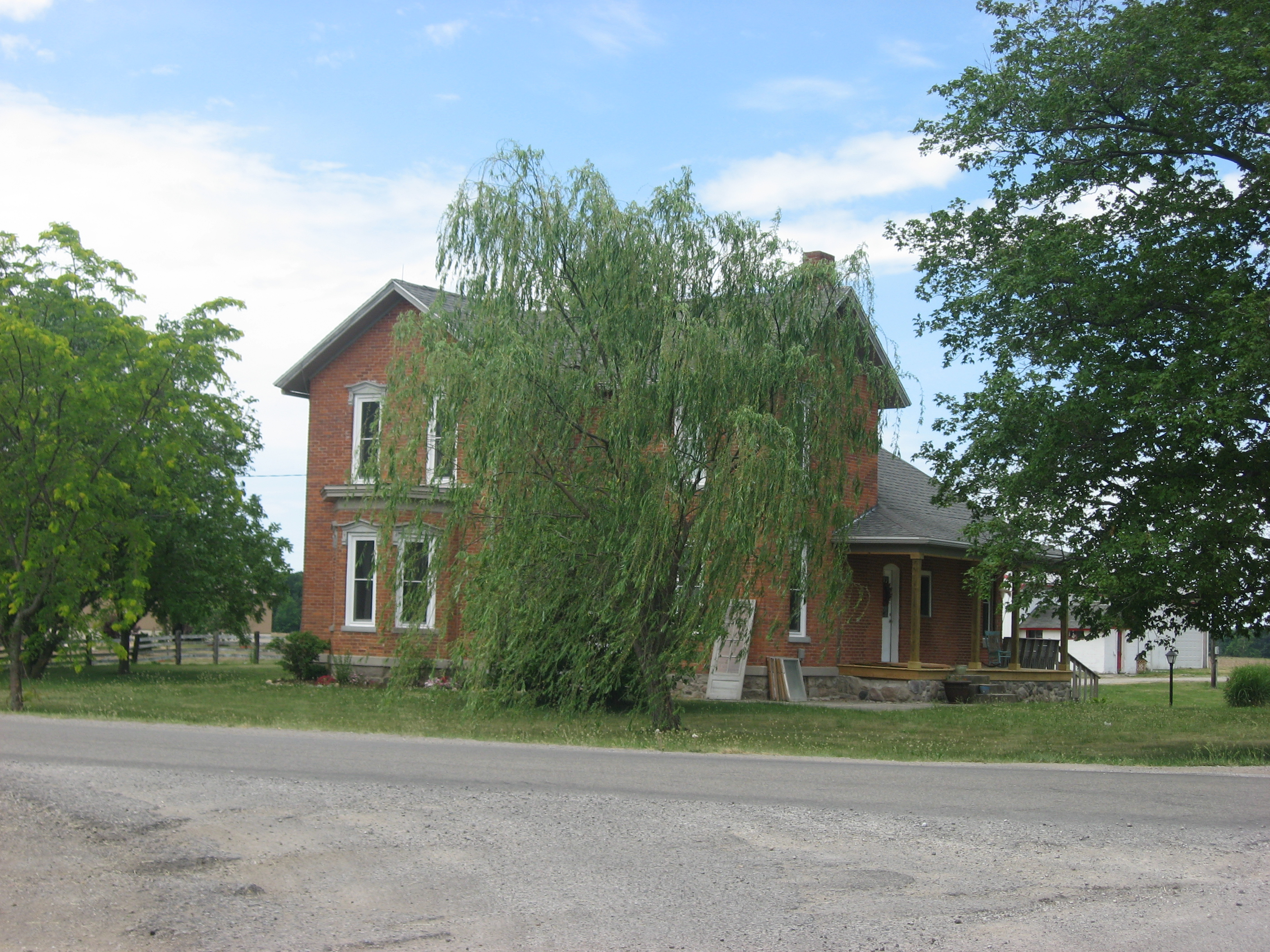
- Joseph Bowman Farmhouse, May 2012

- Location within Indiana Location within the United States
- Location: County Roads 19 and 40, northeast of Garrett, Keyser Township, DeKalb County, Indiana
- Coordinates: 41°22′52″N 85°5′55″W
- Area: less than one acre
- Built: 1875
- Architectural style: Italianate
- MPS: Keyser Township MRA
- NRHP reference No.: 83000013
- Added to NRHP: May 6, 1983

Joseph Bowman Farmhouse is a historic home located near Garrett in Keyser Township, DeKalb County, Indiana. It was built in 1875, and is a two-story, Italianate-style brick dwelling. It has a gable roof and one-story polygonal bay.

It was added to the National Register of Historic Places in 1983.
