= DeKalb County Home and Barn =

Historic residential building in Indiana, United States

- Dekalb County Home and Barn
- U.S. National Register of Historic Places
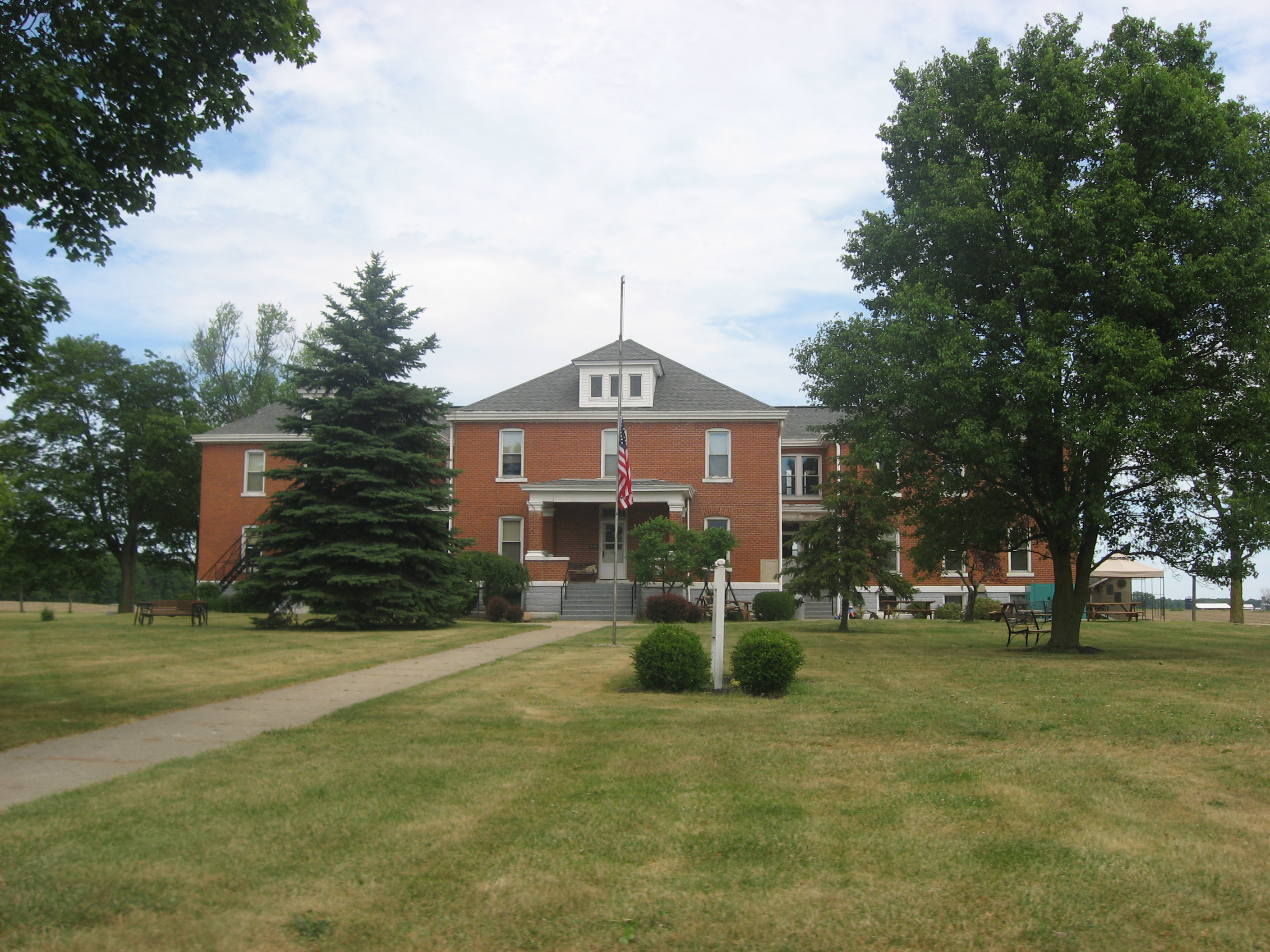
- DeKalb County Home, May 2012

- Location within Indiana Location within the United States
- Location: County Road 40, northeast of Garrett, Keyser Township, DeKalb County, Indiana
- Coordinates: 41°22′50″N 85°4′59″W
- Area: 2 acres (0.81 ha)
- Built: 1908
- MPS: Keyser Township MRA
- NRHP reference No.: 83000015
- Added to NRHP: May 6, 1983

Dekalb County Home and Barn is a historic poor house and barn located at Garrett, Indiana. The barn was built in 1908, and is a 3 1/2-story, T-shaped building. The first level is constructed of rubble stone, with frame upper stories.

It was added to the National Register of Historic Places in 1983.
