= Samuel Bevier House =

Historic house in Indiana, United States

- U.S. National Register of Historic Places
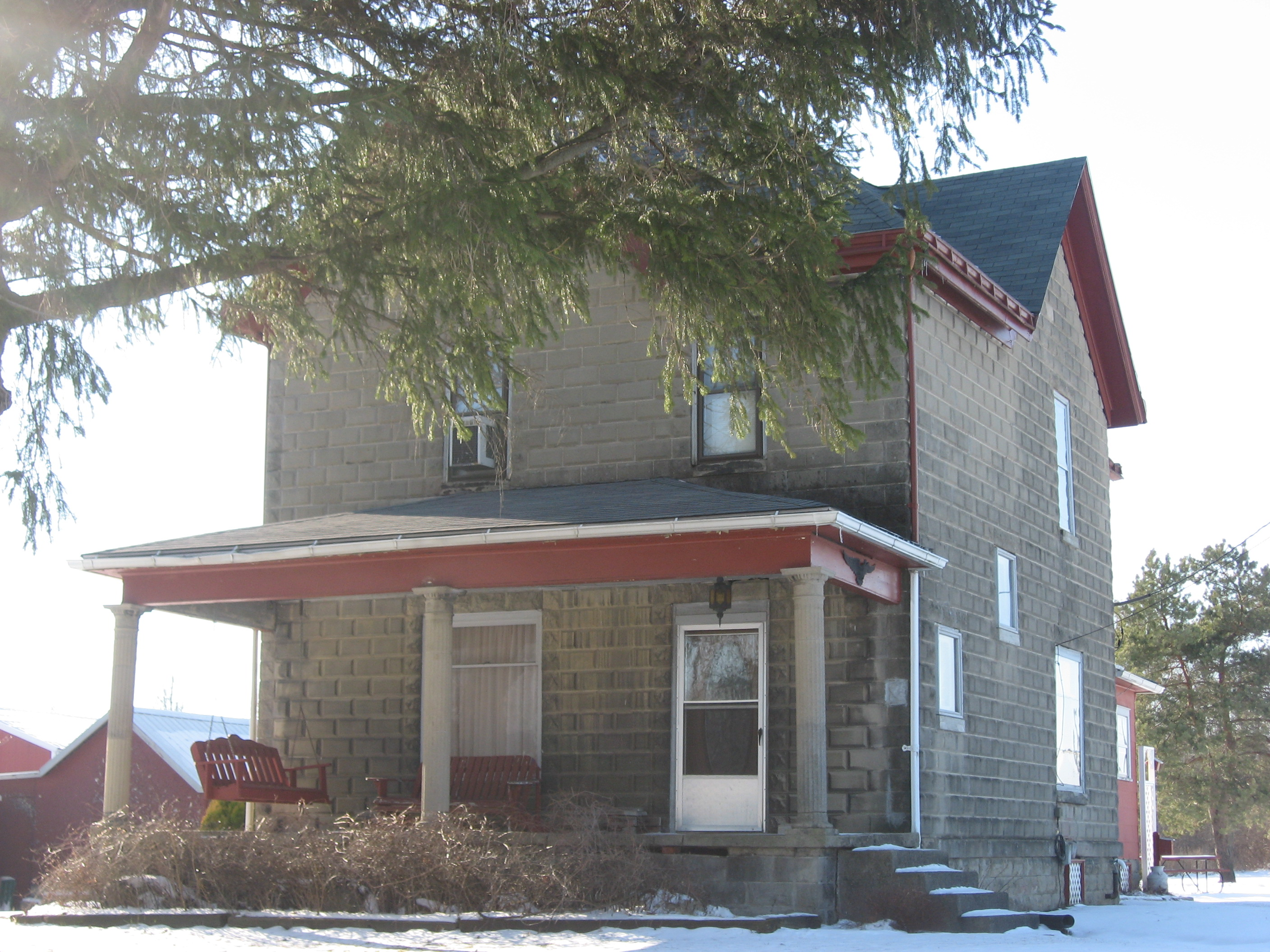
- Samuel Bevier House, January 2013

- Location within Indiana Location within the United States
- Location: County Roads 11 and 52, south of Garrett, Keyser Township, DeKalb County, Indiana
- Coordinates: 41°20′13″N 85°8′15″W
- Area: less than one acre
- Built: 1905
- Built by: Bevier, Samuel
- Architectural style: Colonial Revival, Queen Anne
- MPS: Keyser Township MRA
- NRHP reference No.: 83000014
- Added to NRHP: May 6, 1983

Samuel Bevier House is a historic home located near Garrett in Keyser Township, DeKalb County, Indiana. It was built in 1905, and is a two-story, cast stone Colonial Revival style dwelling with Queen Anne massing. It has a two bay porch supported by cast stone Tuscan order columns.

It was added to the National Register of Historic Places in 1983.
