= Breechbill-Davidson House =

Historic house in Indiana, United States

- U.S. National Register of Historic Places
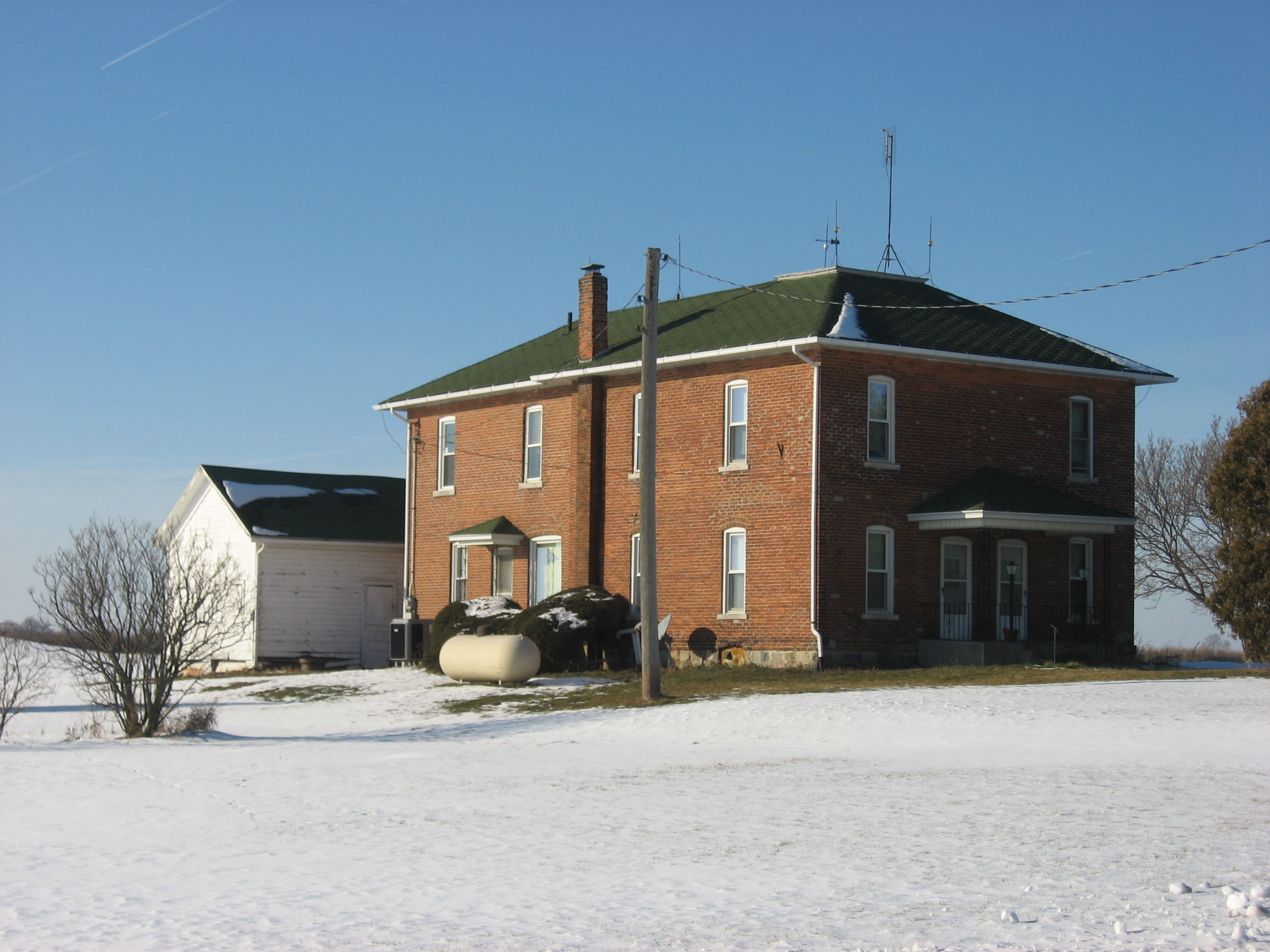
- Breechbill-Davidson House, January 2013

- Location within Indiana Location within the United States
- Location: State Road 8 and County Road 7, northwest of Garrett, Keyser Township, DeKalb County, Indiana
- Coordinates: 41°22′1″N 85°9′21″W
- Area: less than one acre
- Built: 1889
- Built by: Breechbill, Jacob; Davidson, Henry
- Architectural style: Italianate, Federal
- MPS: Keyser Township MRA
- NRHP reference No.: 83000012
- Added to NRHP: May 6, 1983

Breechbill-Davidson House is a historic home located near Garrett in Keyser Township, DeKalb County, Indiana. It was built in 1889, and is a two-story, Italianate-style brick dwelling with Federal detailing. It hipped roof and rear wing. It is located adjacent to the historic Brethren in Christ Church.

It was added to the National Register of Historic Places in 1983.
