= William Fountain House =

Historic house in Indiana, United States

- U.S. National Register of Historic Places
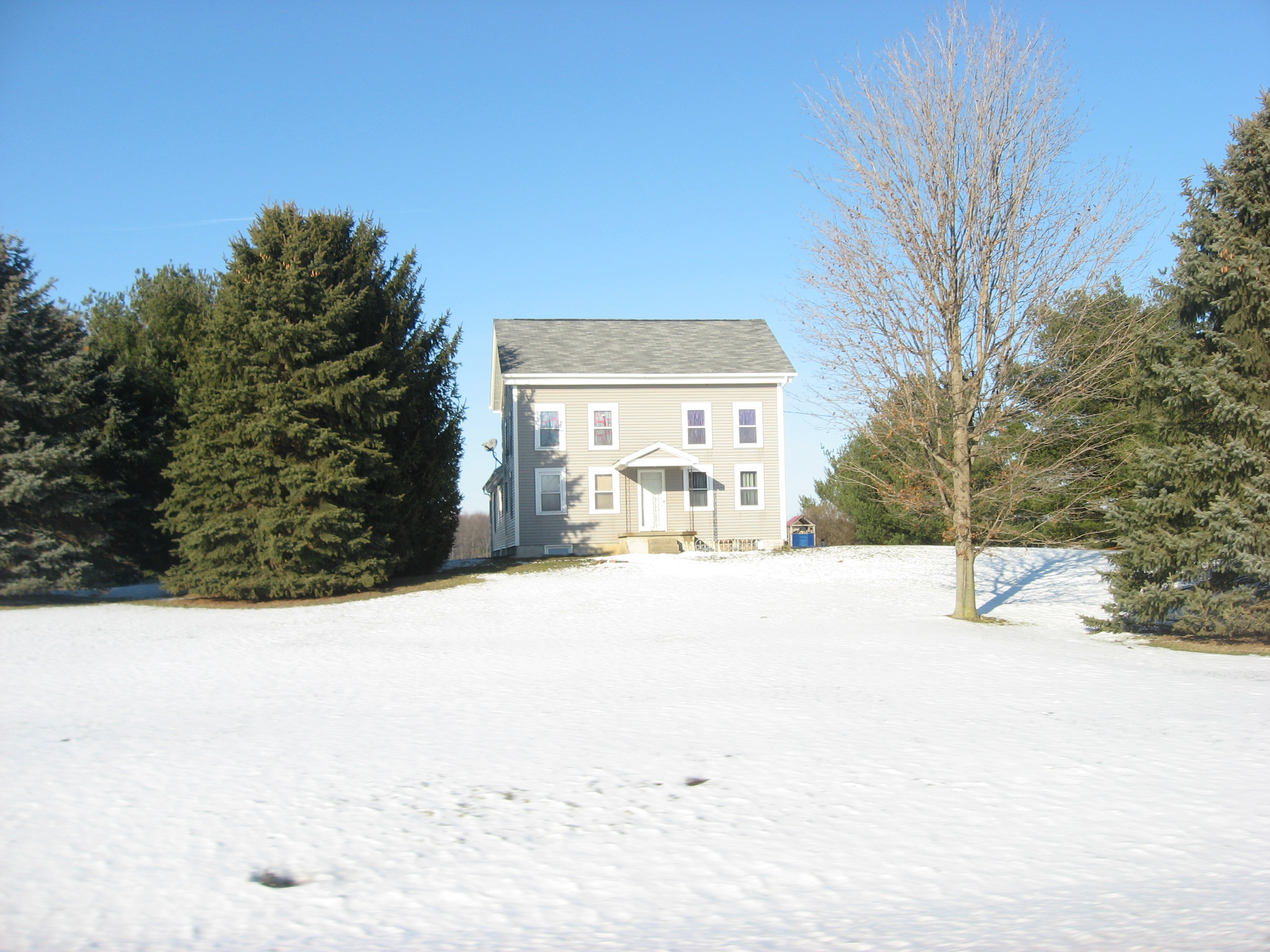
- William Fountain House, January 2013

- Location within Indiana Location within the United States
- Location: State Road 8, northwest of Garrett, Keyser Township, DeKalb County, Indiana
- Coordinates: 41°21′58″N 85°10′38″W
- Area: less than one acre
- Built: 1854
- Built by: Fountain, William
- Architectural style: Greek Revival
- MPS: Keyser Township MRA
- NRHP reference No.: 83000021
- Added to NRHP: May 6, 1983

William Fountain House is a historic home located near Garrett in Keyser Township, DeKalb County, Indiana. It was built in 1854, and is a two-story, five-bay, Greek Revival-style frame dwelling. It has Doric order unfluted corner pilasters and a wide frieze. Its namesake and original resident, William Fountain, emigrated to the United States from Lincolnshire, England and arrived in DeKalb County in 1848.

It was added to the National Register of Historic Places in 1983.
