= Gump House =

Historic house in Indiana, United States

- U.S. National Register of Historic Places
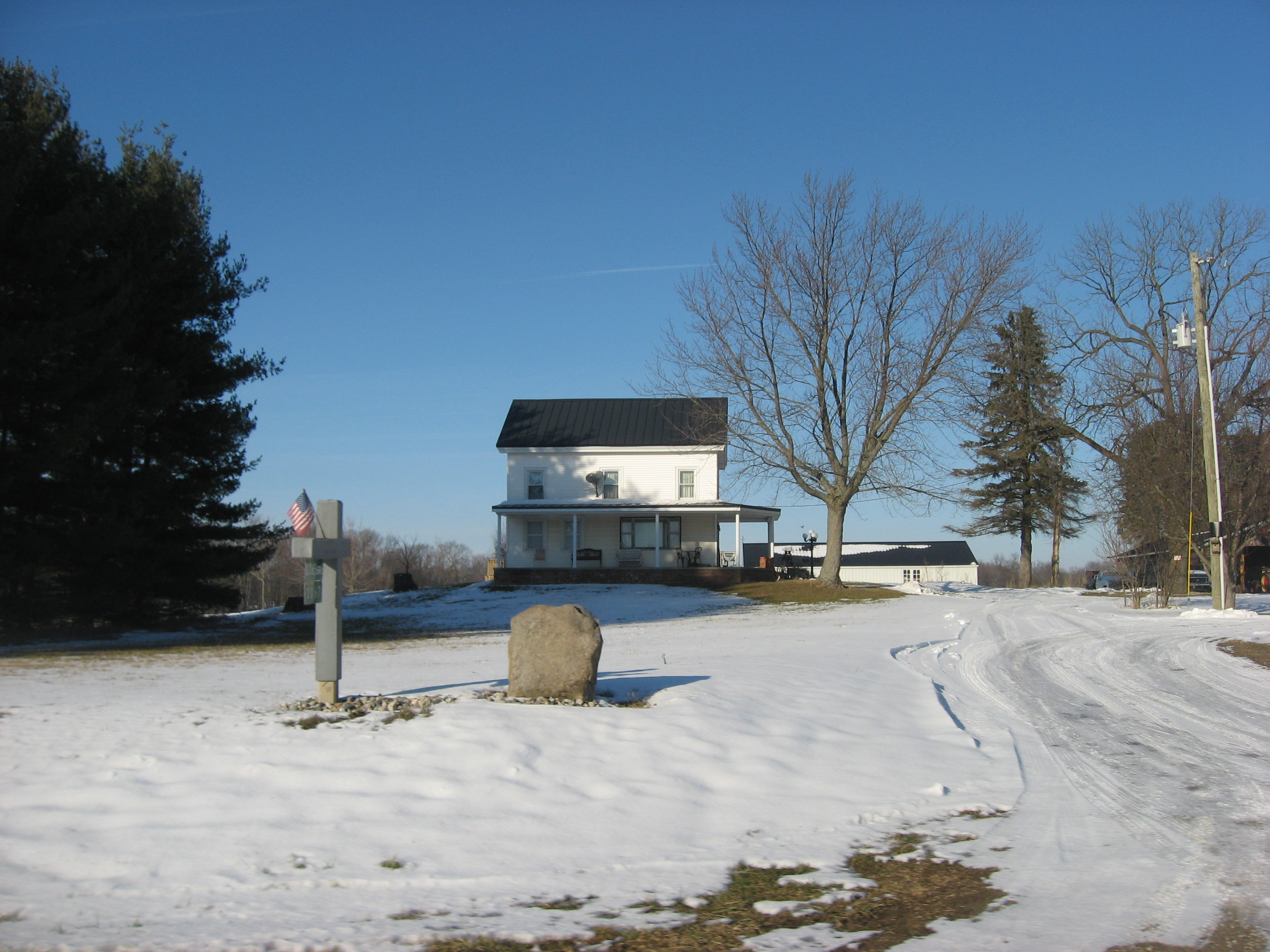
- Gump House, January 2013

- Location within Indiana Location within the United States
- Location: State Road 8, northwest of Garrett, Keyser Township, DeKalb County, Indiana
- Coordinates: 41°21′58″N 85°11′23″W
- Area: less than one acre
- Built: c. 1854
- Architectural style: Greek Revival
- MPS: Keyser Township MRA
- NRHP reference No.: 83000020
- Added to NRHP: May 6, 1983

Gump House is a historic home located near Garrett in Keyser Township, DeKalb County, Indiana. It was built about 1854, and is a two-story, five-bay, Greek Revival-style frame dwelling. It has Doric order corner pilasters and a wide frieze.

It was added to the National Register of Historic Places in 1983.
