= Henry Shull Farmhouse Inn =

Historic inn in Indiana, United States

- U.S. National Register of Historic Places
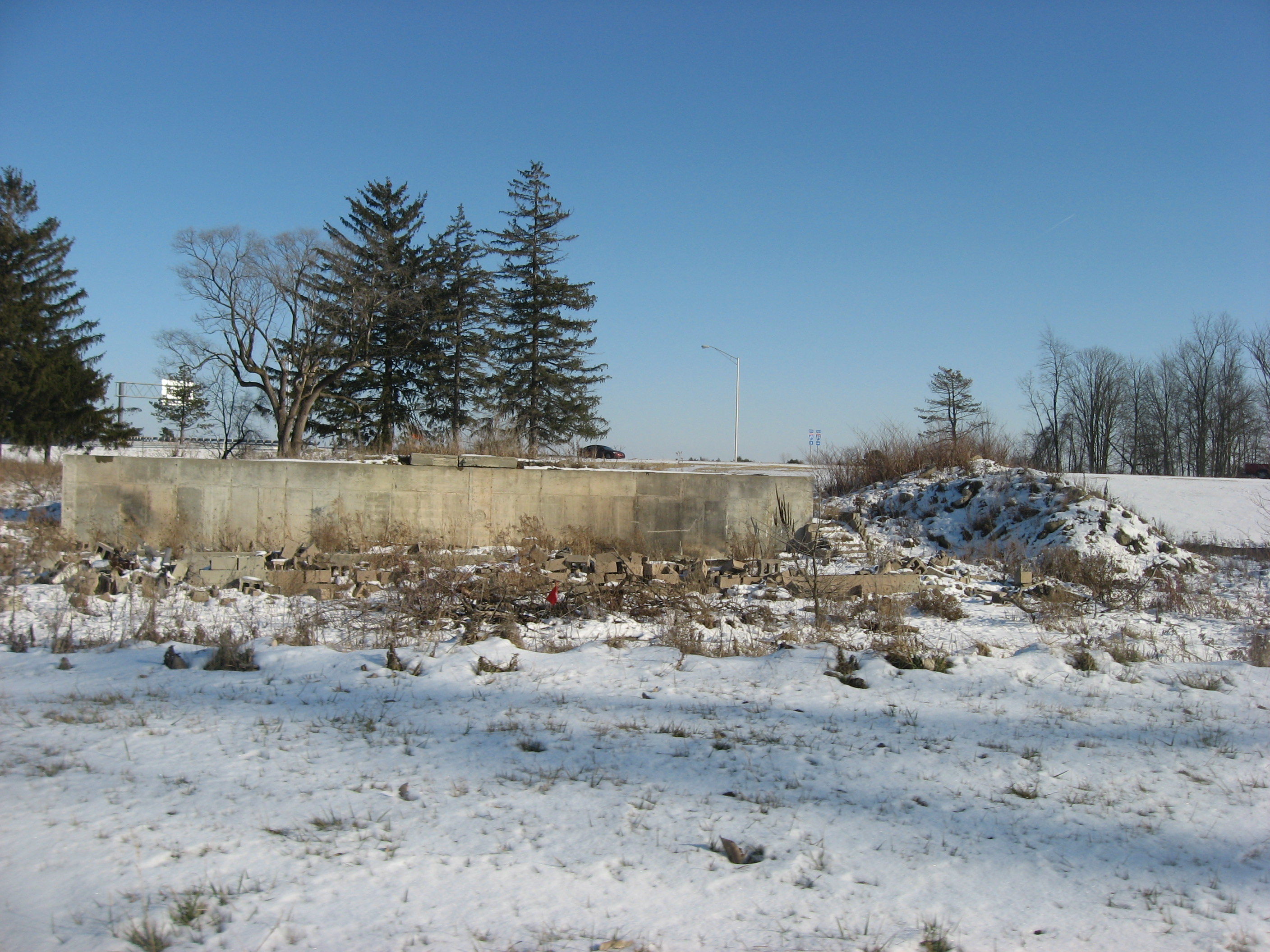
- Site of the Henry Shull Farmhouse Inn, January 2013

- Location within Indiana Location within the United States
- Location: County Road 11-A, southeast of Garrett, Keyser Township, DeKalb County, Indiana
- Coordinates: 41°19′36″N 85°5′23″W
- Area: less than one acre
- Built: 1839
- Built by: Shull, Jacob
- Architectural style: Greek Revival
- MPS: Keyser Township MRA
- NRHP reference No.: 83000023
- Added to NRHP: May 6, 1983

Henry Shull Farmhouse Inn was a historic home located near Garrett in Keyser Township, DeKalb County, Indiana. It was built in 1839, and was a 1 1/2-story, Greek Revival-style frame dwelling. It had a low gable roof and corner pilasters. It was originally built as a farmhouse and inn. It has been demolished.

It was added to the National Register of Historic Places in 1983.
