= Orin Clark House =

Historic house in Indiana, United States

- U.S. National Register of Historic Places
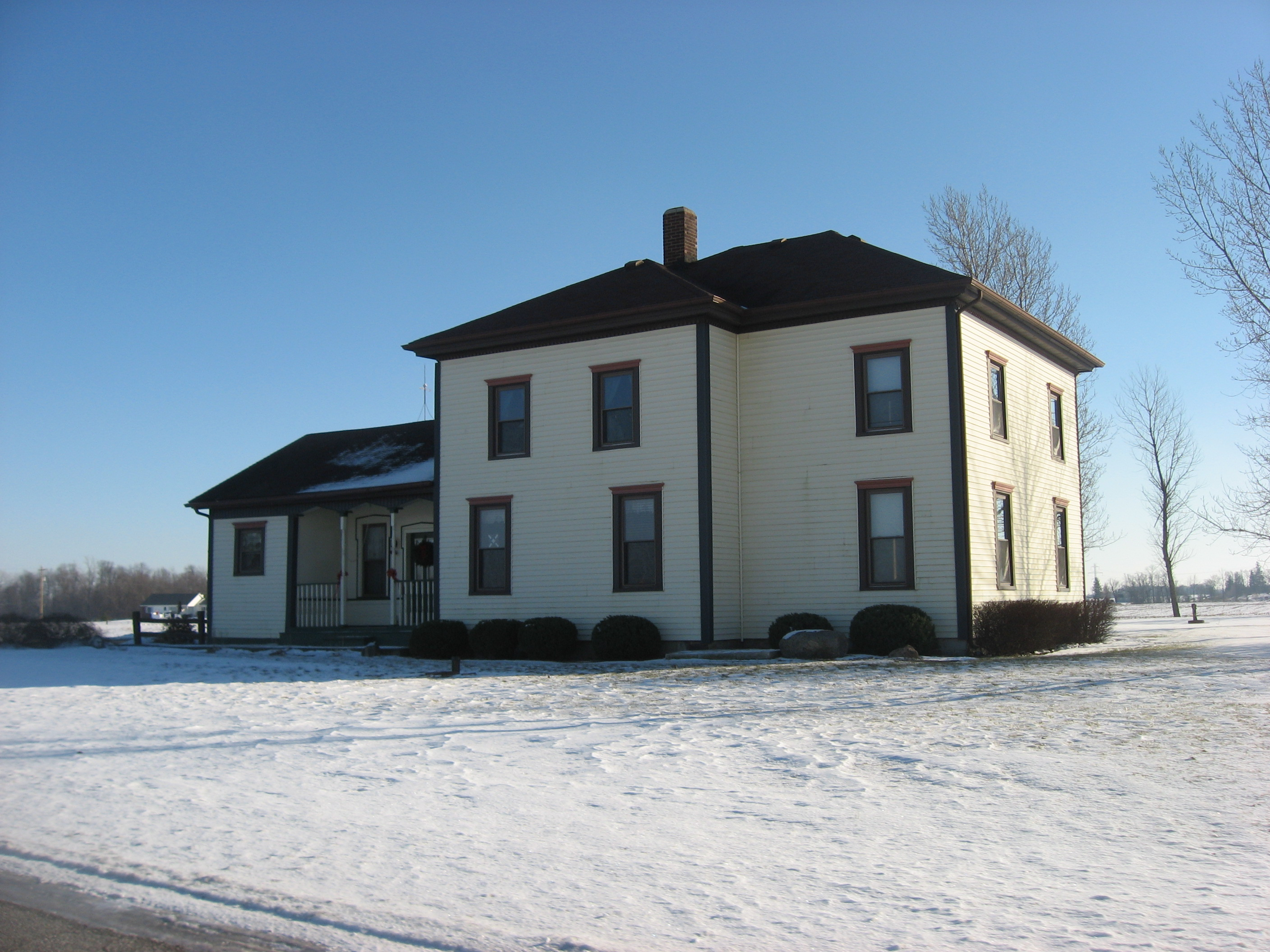
- Orin Clark House, January 2013

- Location within Indiana Location within the United States
- Location: County Roads 3 and 48, west of Garrett, Keyser Township, DeKalb County, Indiana
- Coordinates: 41°21′3″N 85°10′34″W
- Area: less than one acre
- Built: 1870
- Architectural style: Greek Revival, Italianate
- MPS: Keyser Township MRA
- NRHP reference No.: 83000010
- Added to NRHP: May 6, 1983

Orin Clark House is a historic home located near Garrett in Keyser Township, DeKalb County, Indiana. It was built in 1870, and is a two-story, Italianate-style frame dwelling with Greek Revival detailing. It has a hip roofed main block and one-story rear wing with a gable roof. It has Doric order unfluted corner pilasters and a plain wide frieze.

It was added to the National Register of Historic Places in 1983.
