= J.H. Haag House =

Historic house in Indiana, United States

- U.S. National Register of Historic Places
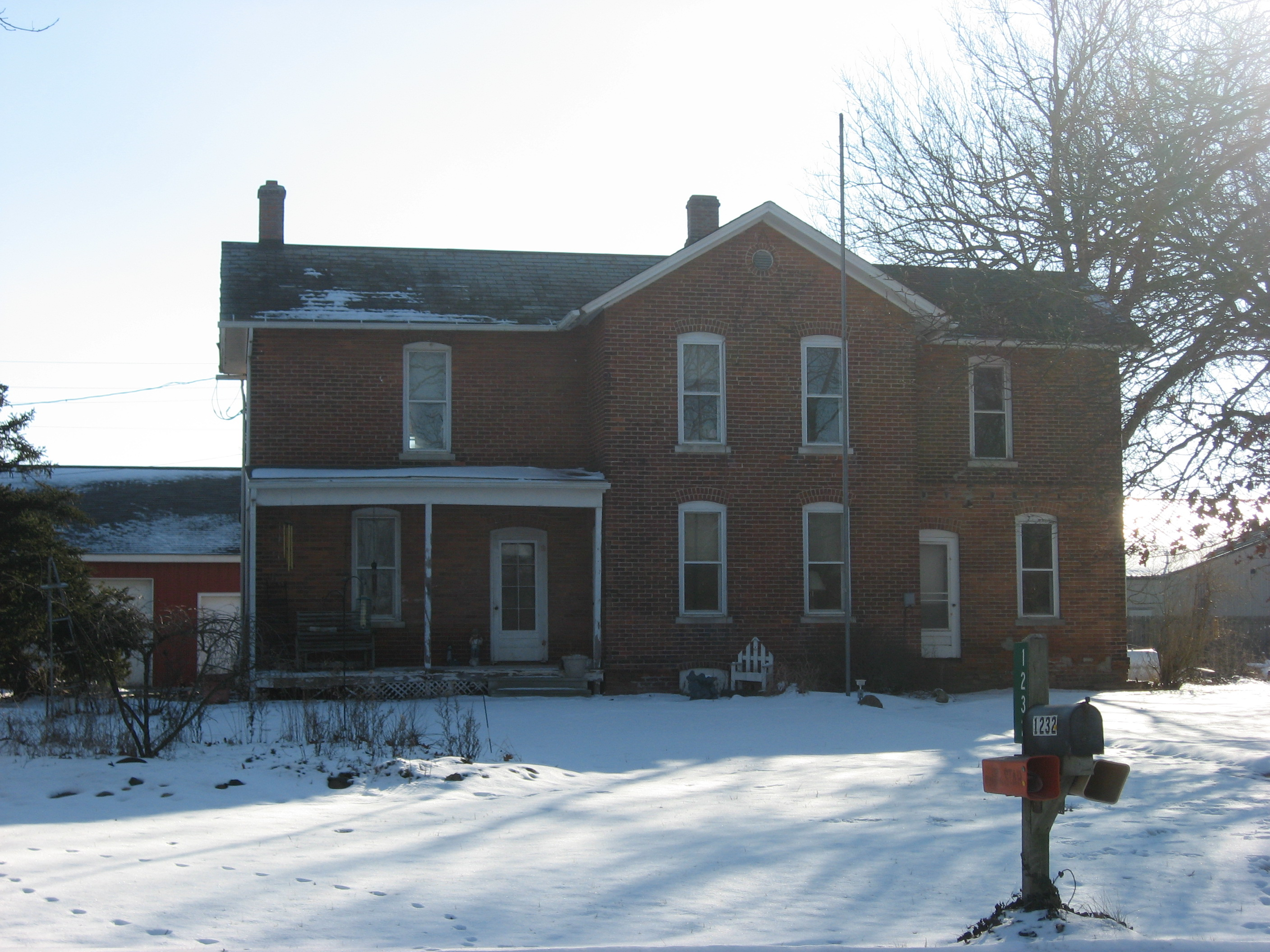
- J.H. Haag House, January 2013

- Location within Indiana Location within the United States
- Location: County Road 54, Garrett, Indiana
- Coordinates: 41°19′46″N 85°8′7″W
- Area: less than one acre
- Built: c. 1875
- Built by: Haag, J.H.
- Architectural style: Italianate
- MPS: Keyser Township MRA
- NRHP reference No.: 83000019
- Added to NRHP: May 6, 1983

J.H. Haag House is a historic home located at Garrett, Indiana. It was built about 1875, and is a two-story, Italianate-style brick dwelling. It has a cross gable roof and two-story gabled wing.

It was added to the National Register of Historic Places in 1983.
