= Keyser Township School 8 =

- U.S. National Register of Historic Places
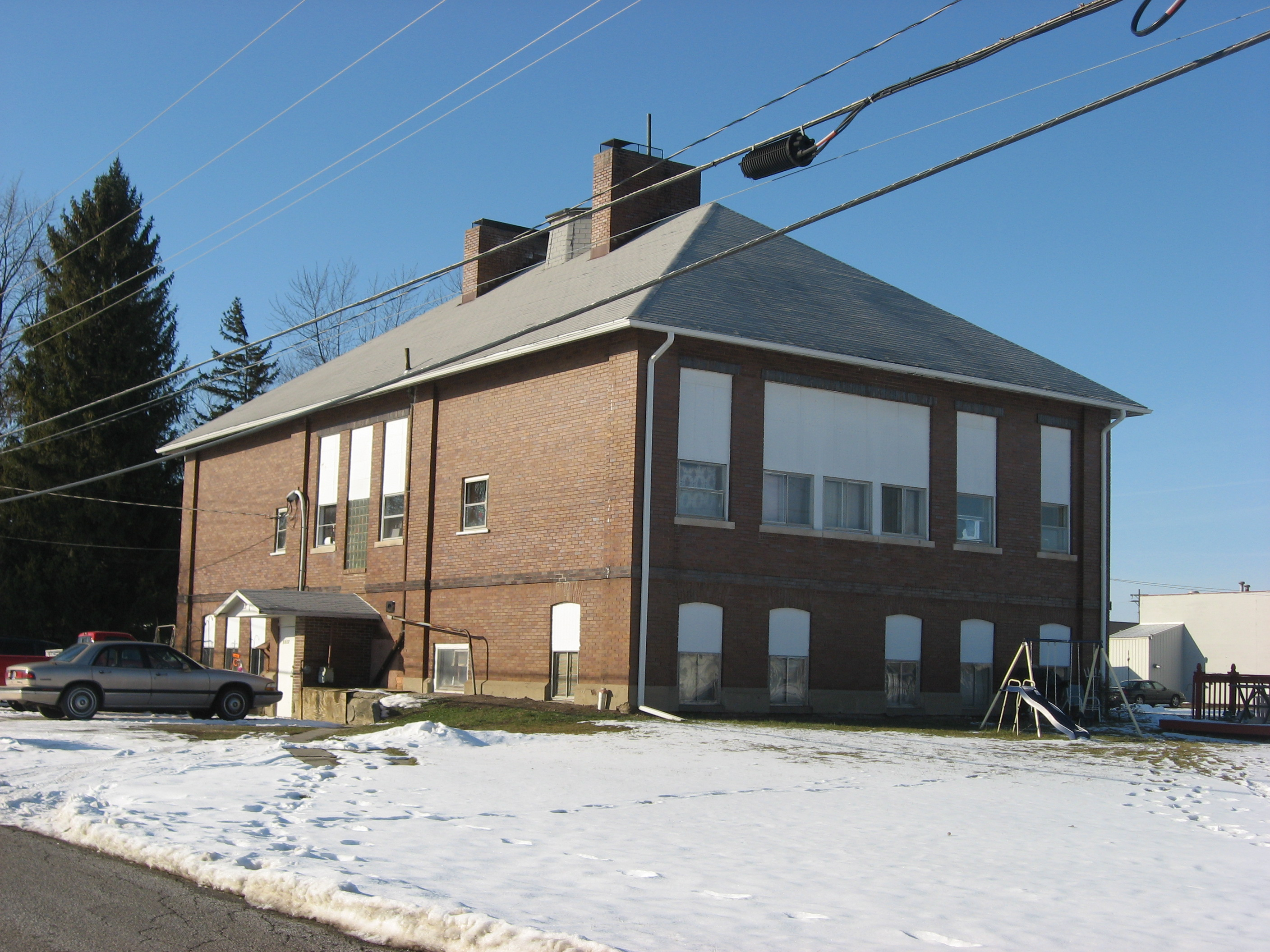
- Keyser Township School 8, January 2013

- Location within Indiana Location within the United States
- Location: E. Quincy St., Garrett, Indiana
- Coordinates: 41°21′6″N 85°7′3″W
- Area: less than one acre
- Built: 1914
- Architectural style: Romanesque
- MPS: Keyser Township MRA
- NRHP reference No.: 83000017
- Added to NRHP: May 6, 1983

Keyser Township School 8 is a historic school building located at Garrett, Indiana. It was built in 1914, and is a one-story, Romanesque Revival-style brick building on a raised basement. It has a hipped roof. The building was converted to apartments in 1956.

It was added to the National Register of Historic Places in 1983.
