= Garrett Community Mausoleum =

Historic site in DeKalb County, Indiana

- U.S. National Register of Historic Places
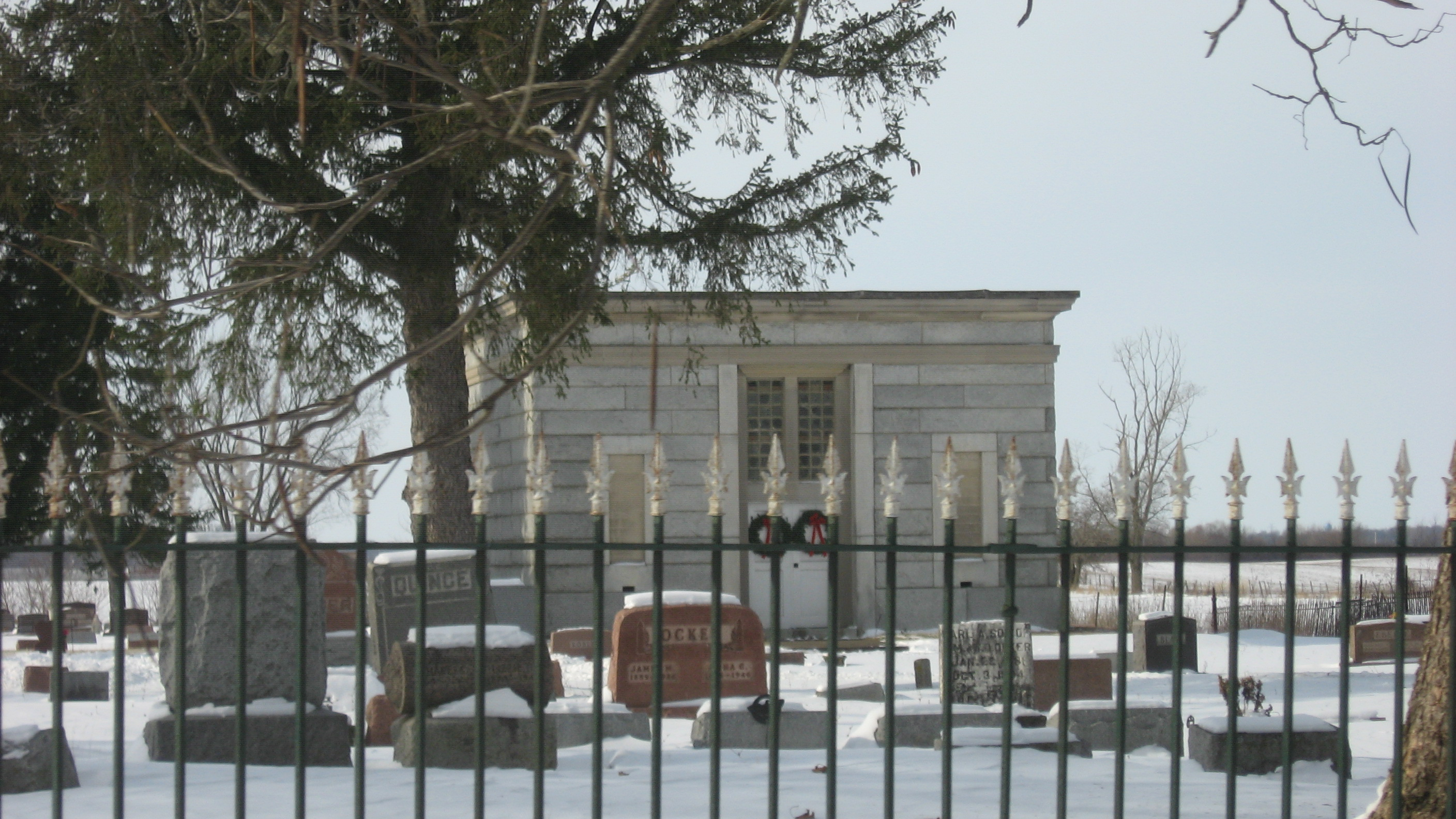
- Garrett Community Mausoleum, January 2014

- Location within Indiana Location within the United States
- Location: S. Hamsher St., Garrett, Indiana
- Coordinates: 41°20′43″N 85°08′38″W
- Area: less than 1 acre (0.40 ha)
- Built: 1922
- Architect: Sievert, Henry; Sweitzer & Fifer, Co.
- Architectural style: Classical Revival
- MPS: The Early Community Mausoleum Movement in Indiana
- NRHP reference No.: 14000071
- Added to NRHP: March 24, 2014

Garrett Community Mausoleum is a historic mausoleum located in Calvary Cemetery at Garrett, Indiana. It was built in 1922, and is a one-story, cubic granite structure with simple Classical Revival style detail. It measures 30 feet wide and 42 feet deep. The mausoleum was largely used for interments into the 1950s, with the most recent in 1999.

It was added to the National Register of Historic Places in 2014.
