= Creek Chub Bait Company =

Fishing Tackle Company

The Creek Chub Bait Company was a fishing tackle company founded in 1916 by Henry Dills, Carl Heinzerling, and George Schulthess.

== History ==
The Creek Chub Bait Company was conceived in 1906 by three Indiana fishermen with the creation of a lure that would become known as the "Wriggler." Henry Dills, Carl Heinzerling, and George Schulthess combined their knowledge and passion for fishing to create effective, quality wooden artificial fish bait.

In 1915, Dills filed a patent for the Creek Chub Wriggler lure. On September 7, 1920, it was approved by the U.S. Patent Office. Dills filed another patent application in July 1918, shortly after the company was officially founded, this patent improved upon the existing lure by adding a scale-like appearance to the wooden surface that would imitate a real minnow. This second patent was approved in December 1919.

Many of the first employees of the Creek Chub Bait Company were women, and throughout the company's history, it boasted a workforce consisting primarily of women. This was because Dills, and others in management, believed that women held a better attention to detail and appreciation for color, as well as having better painting skills due to their smaller hands.

The company had a set of foundations that valued quality and purpose that not only allowed them to succeed across the United States but in the international markets as well, with countries such as France and Sweden among the top international consumers. By 1936, the company noted sales in 48 foreign countries and held 32 patents, growing into the largest manufacturer of artificial baits. Creek Chub Bait Company utilized an exclusive process of treating the wood used in the lures and each hand-painted lure featured as many as fourteen or fifteen coats of primer, paint, and lacquer.

The outlook for the company took a downturn throughout 1942 following the increased difficulty in obtaining the raw materials for lures and orders from the War Production Board curtailing the manufacture of fishing lures. The company operated with limited staff during this time as well, with reportedly only 30 employees where previously there had been upwards of 100 employees.

During their peak of production, the Creek Chub Bait Company became one of the country's leading manufacturers of artificial fishing lures. Throughout its history, the company manufactured over 300 lure varieties ranging in size, shape, color, and design. Traditionally, these lures were carved from wood, though in the 1950s and 1960s, Creek Chub Bait Company began experimenting with plastic lures, introducing many to the market.

In 1978, Creek Chub Bait Company was purchased by another lure manufacturer, the Lazy Ike Corp. of Des Moines, Iowa. Lazy Ike continued to market and produce Creek Chub lures until Lazy Ike filed for bankruptcy. By 1979, the fishing tackle factory closed.

== Legacy ==
Creek Chub Bait Company lures remain popular among collectors.

In 2017, the Indiana Historical Bureau, along with the Garrett Historical Society, Garrett State Bank, Dr. Harold Smith, and the National Fishing Lure Collectors Club, installed a historical marker in Garrett, Indiana to commemorate the impact the Creek Chub Bait Company in the Hoosier state and its legacy.
