= Mountz House =

Historic house in Indiana, United States

- U.S. National Register of Historic Places
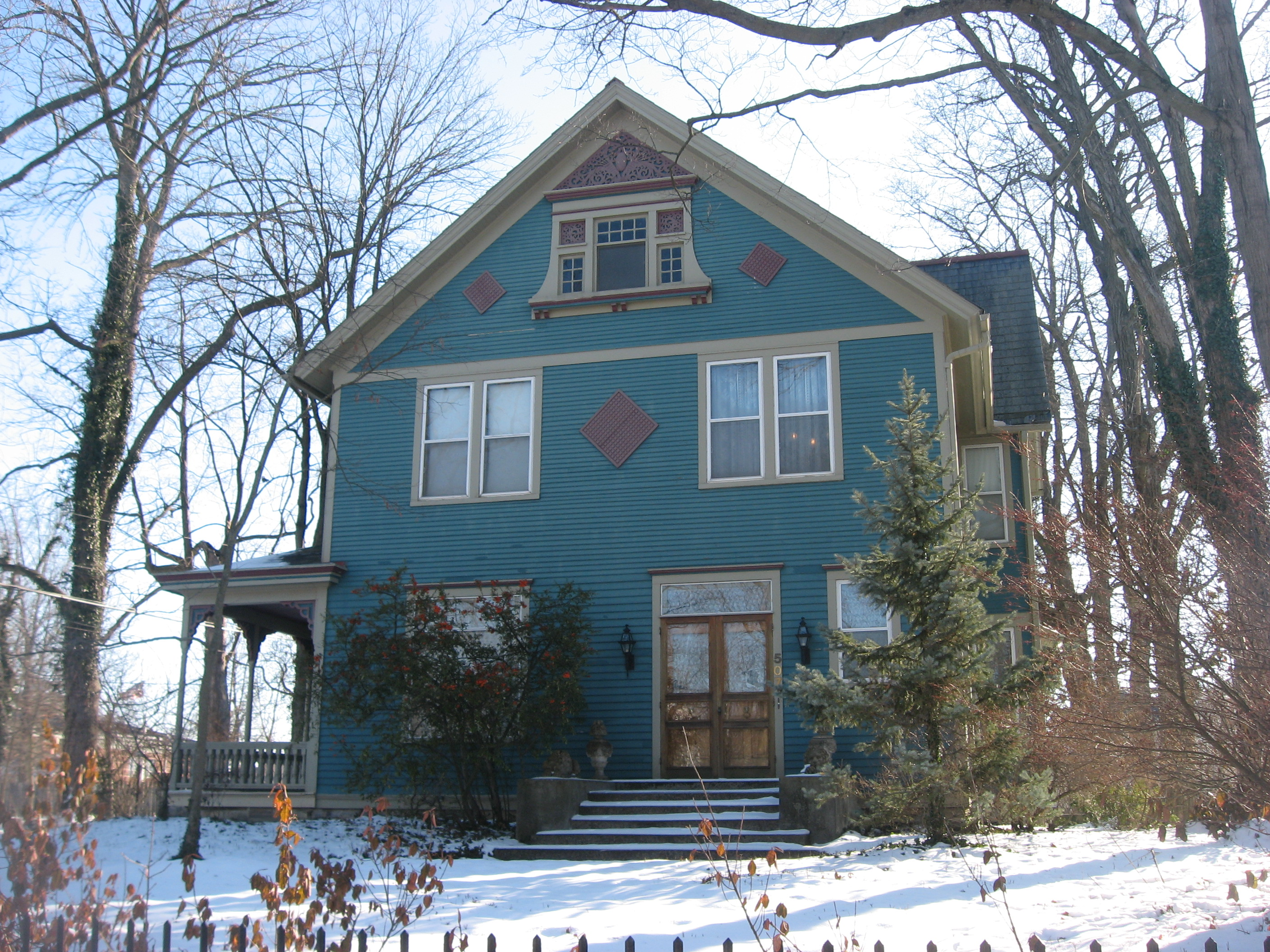
- Mountz House, January 2013

- Location within Indiana Location within the United States
- Location: 507 E. Houston St., Garrett, Indiana
- Coordinates: 41°20′53″N 85°7′49″W
- Area: less than one acre
- Built: 1893
- Architectural style: Queen Anne
- NRHP reference No.: 79000013
- Added to NRHP: September 11, 1979

Mountz House is a historic home located in Garrett, Indiana, United States. It was built in 1893, and is a two-story, four bay by five bay, Queen Anne style frame dwelling. It has a cross gable roof and two-story gabled wing. It sits on a fieldstone foundation and has a pitched slate roof. It has narrow clapboard siding and decorative diamond-shaped checkerboard pattern panels. It features a front porch with turned posts and decorative brackets. Also on the property is a contributing barn.

The house was originally built for Herman F. Coffinberry, president of the Garrett Banking Company. Coffinberry served as auditor of DeKalb County from 1890 to 1894. He used embezzled funds from the county government to construct the home. He committed suicide in the house when the local sheriff came to arrest him in 1906. Henry Wesley Mountz, an attorney with the Garrett Banking Company, later purchased the property. His son, George Edward Mountz, became a prominent lawyer in his own right. He attended DePauw University and then Harvard Law School. He enlisted as a naval intelligence officer in the Second World War and served on the Japanese War Crimes Commission. He was involved in the trial of General Tomoyuki Yamashita. He later returned to Garrett and practiced law there, while also serving as DeKalb County prosecutor and Garrett city attorney.

It was added to the National Register of Historic Places in 1983.
