= Edward Kelham House =

Historic house in Indiana, United States

- U.S. National Register of Historic Places
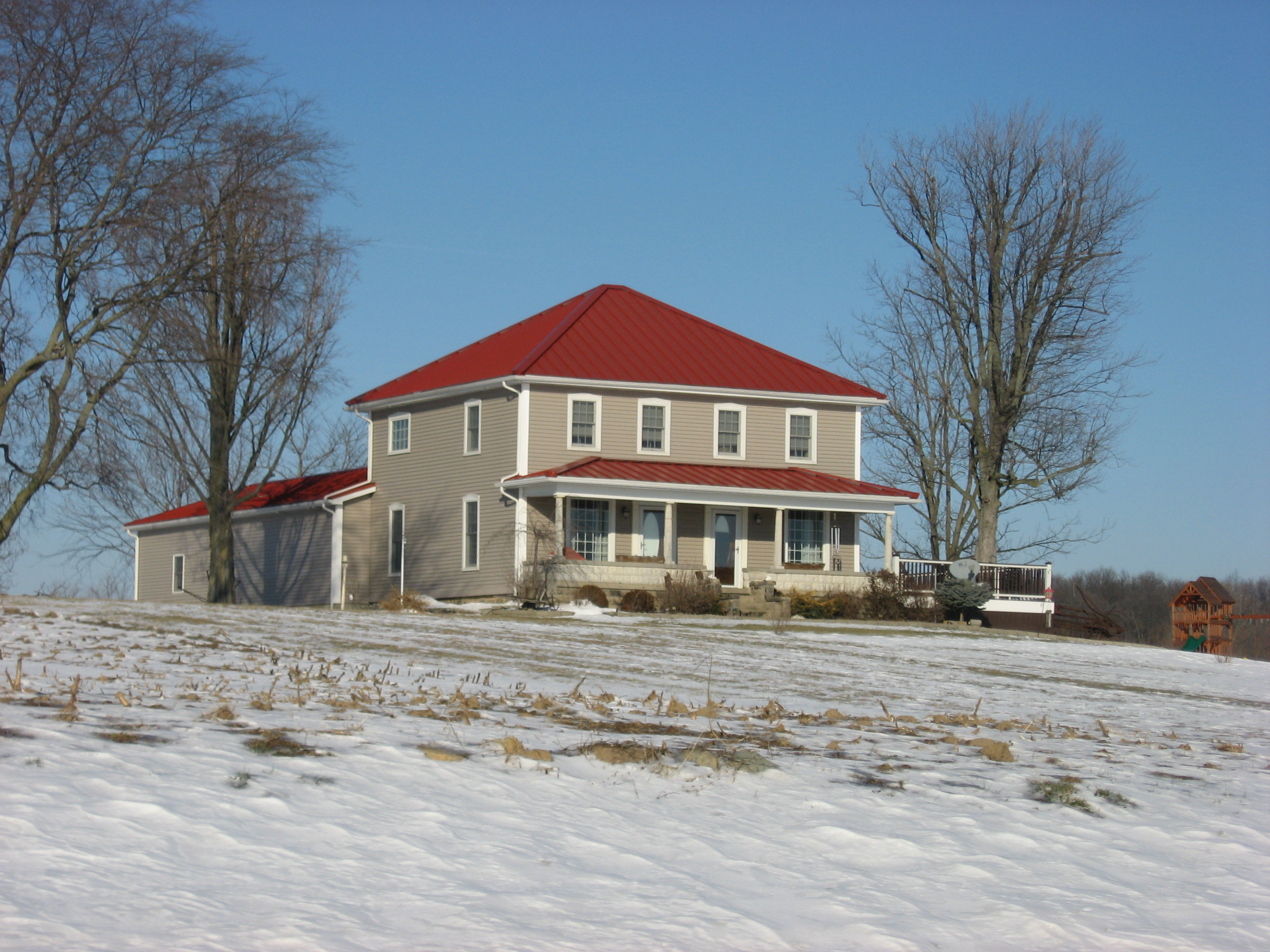
- Edward Kelham House, January 2013

- Location within Indiana Location within the United States
- Location: County Road 48, west of Garrett, Keyser Township, DeKalb County, Indiana
- Coordinates: 41°21′7″N 85°11′20″W
- Area: less than one acre
- Built: 1870
- Architectural style: Greek Revival, Italianate, Colonial Revival
- MPS: Keyser Township MRA
- NRHP reference No.: 83000018
- Added to NRHP: May 6, 1983

Edward Kelham House is a historic home located near Garrett in Keyser Township, DeKalb County, Indiana. It was built in 1870, and is a two-story, Italianate-style frame dwelling with Greek Revival detailing. It has one-story, hip roofed, Colonial Revival style front porch supported by Tuscan order columns. It has unfluted corner pilasters and a plain wide frieze. Its namesake and original resident, Edward Kelham, was an immigrant from Lincolnshire, England who settled in DeKalb County in 1857. The home is considered one of the earliest examples of Italianate architecture in DeKalb County.

It was added to the National Register of Historic Places in 1983.
