= Rakestraw House =

Historic house in Indiana, United States

- U.S. National Register of Historic Places
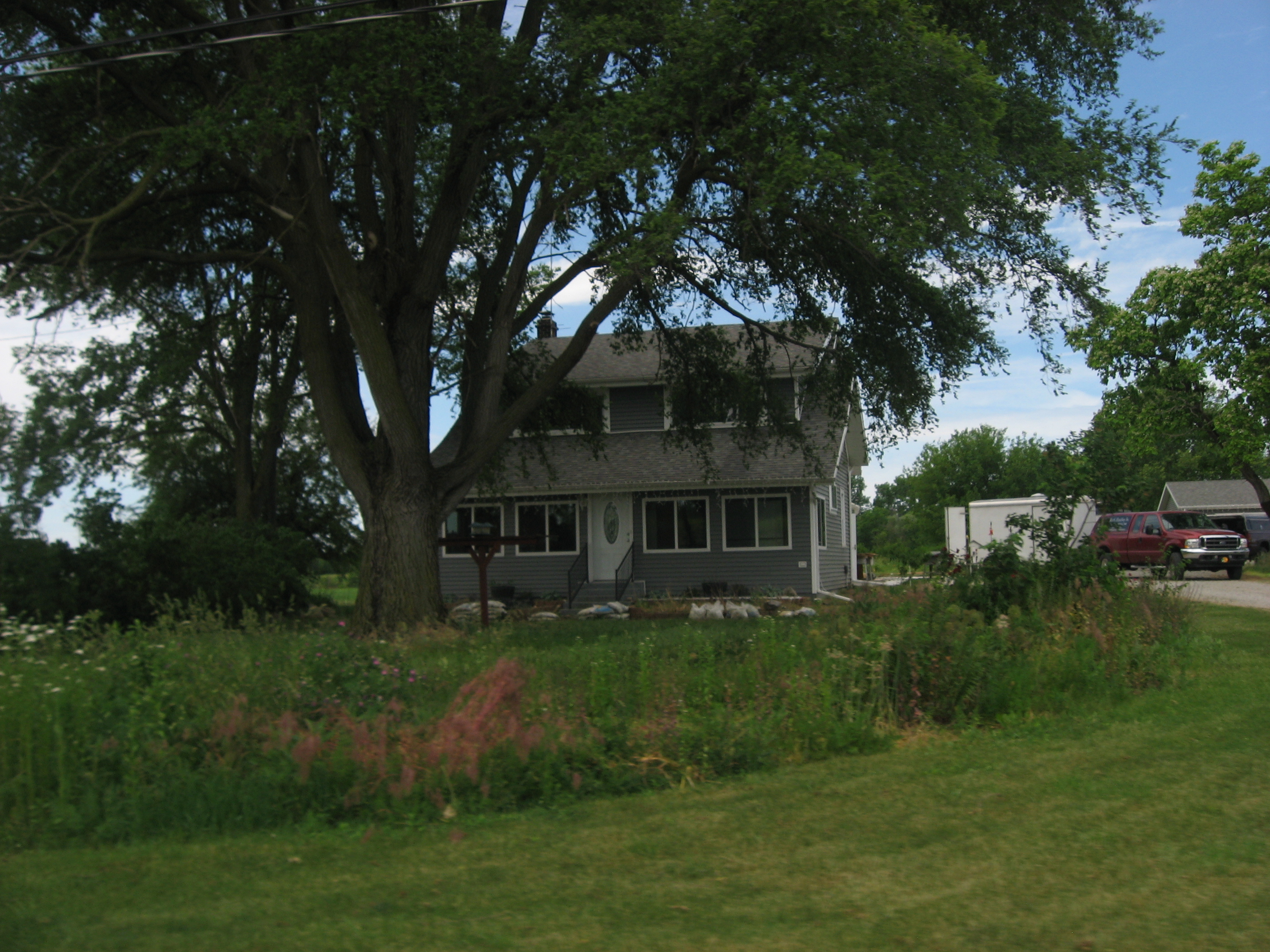
- Rakestraw House, May 2012

- Location within Indiana Location within the United States
- Location: County Road 19, northeast of Garrett, Keyser Township, DeKalb County, Indiana
- Coordinates: 41°22′11″N 85°5′54″W
- Area: less than one acre
- Built: c. 1915
- Architectural style: Craftsman Bungalow
- MPS: Keyser Township MRA
- NRHP reference No.: 83000024
- Added to NRHP: May 6, 1983

Rakestraw House is a historic home located near Garrett in Keyser Township, DeKalb County, Indiana. It was built about 1915, and is a 1 1/2-story, Bungalow / American Craftsman style frame dwelling. It has a low pitched gable roof and large shed roofed dormer. In 1880, decades before the house was built, Amos Rakestraw used this property as farmland. The Rakestraw family owned the home until the 1950s.

It was added to the National Register of Historic Places in 1983.
