= John Wilderson House =

Historic house in Indiana, United States

- U.S. National Register of Historic Places
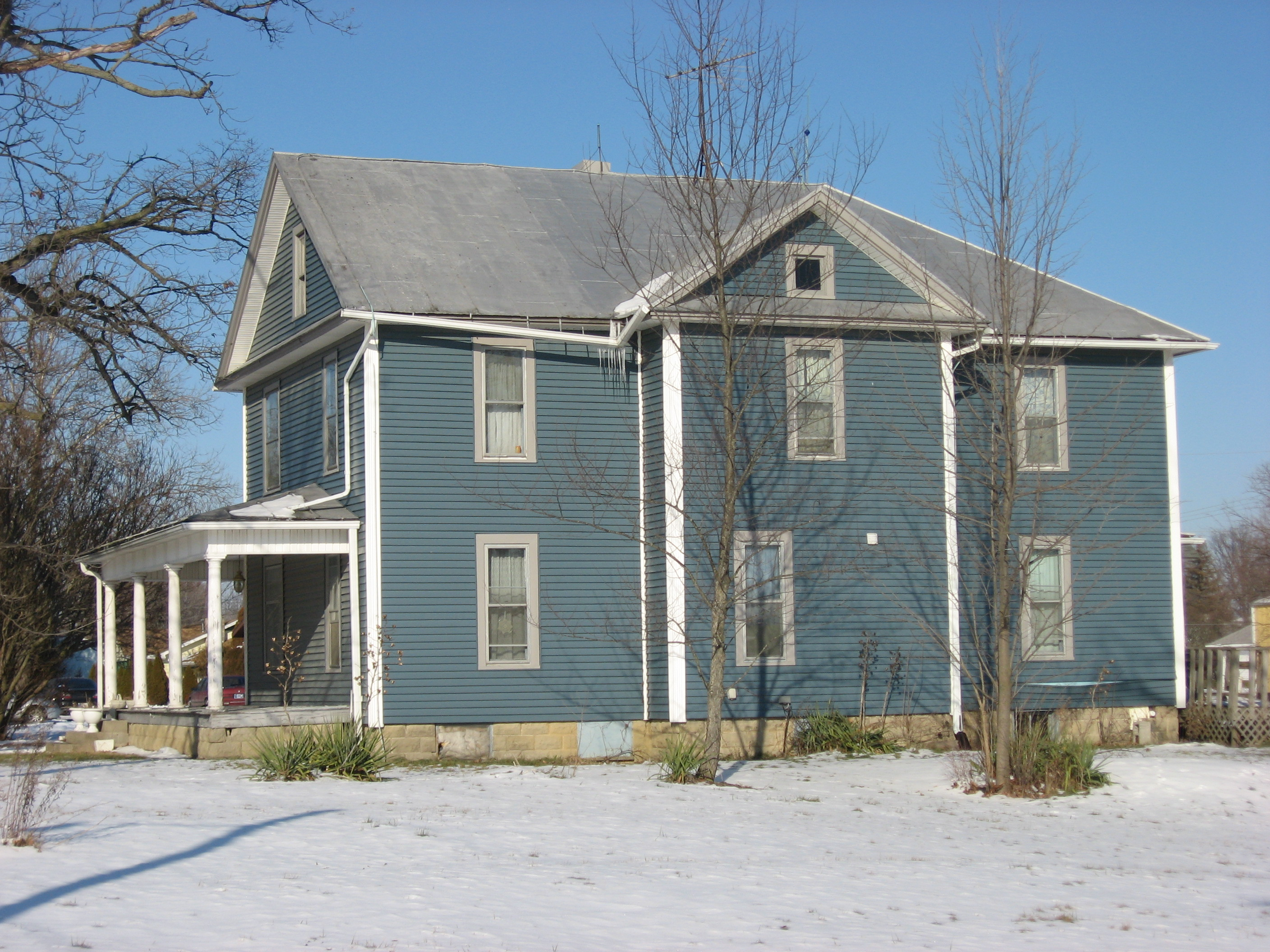
- John Wilderson House, January 2013

- Location within Indiana Location within the United States
- Location: County Road 54, Garrett, Indiana
- Coordinates: 41°20′4″N 85°8′12″W
- Area: less than one acre
- Built: 1909
- Built by: Wilderson, John
- Architectural style: Colonial Revival
- MPS: Keyser Township MRA
- NRHP reference No.: 83000025
- Added to NRHP: May 6, 1983

John Wilderson House is a historic home located at Garrett, Indiana. It was built about 1909, and is a two-story, L-shaped, Colonial Revival-style frame dwelling. It features a wraparound porch on a cast stone base and supported by unfluted Tuscan order columns.

It was added to the National Register of Historic Places in 1983.
