= Henry Peters House =

Historic house in Indiana, United States

- U.S. National Register of Historic Places
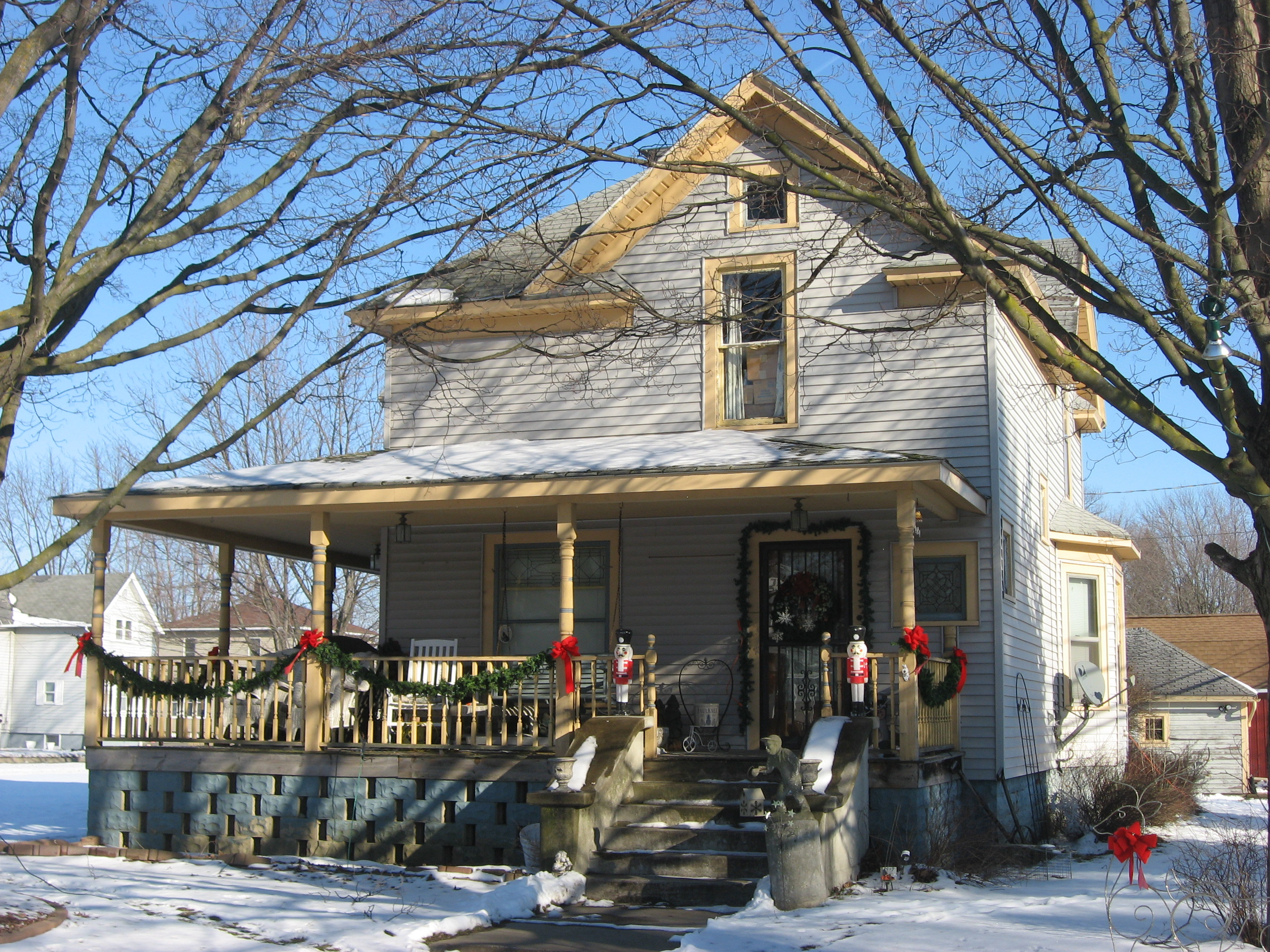
- Henry Peters House, January 2013

- Location within Indiana Location within the United States
- Location: 201 N. 6th St., Garrett, Indiana
- Coordinates: 41°21′6″N 85°7′11″W
- Area: less than one acre
- Built: 1910
- Built by: Peters, Henry
- Architectural style: Colonial Revival
- MPS: Keyser Township MRA
- NRHP reference No.: 83000022
- Added to NRHP: May 6, 1983

Henry Peters House is a historic home located at Garrett, Indiana. It was built about 1910, and is a two-story, Colonial Revival-style frame dwelling. It has a hip roofed main block with projecting end gables. It features a hip roofed wraparound porch.

It was added to the National Register of Historic Places in 1983.
