= Jane L. Hine =

American ornithologist (1831–1916)

- Born: April 2, 1831; Erie County, Ohio
- Died: February 11, 1916 (aged 84); Sedan, Indiana
- Resting place: Waterloo Cemetery
- Known for: Ornithologist; Conservationist; Writer
- Spouse: Horatio S. Hine (m. 1857; died 1896)

Jane L. (Brooks) Hine (2 April 1831 – 11 February 1916) was an American ornithologist and conservationist.

== Early life and education ==
Jane Lovisa Brooks was born April 2, 1831, in Erie County, Ohio to parents Lonson and Mary Brooks.

Brooks attended public school in Erie County and later attended high school in Berlin Heights, Ohio. She attended higher education courses at Oberlin College in Ohio.

After her education, she moved to Sedan, Indiana and remained there for most of her life. When her sister, Cynthia, died in September 1855, leaving behind three sons, Jane married her sister’s widower, Horatio S. Hine, in November 1857. The couple had three children of their own while also raising three sons from Horatio’s previous marriage.

== Writing and activism ==
Around the mid to late 1880s, after raising her family, she began ornithological work by studying the birds near her Sedan farm. Hine had attended college courses, but without formal training, she became an ornithologist by doing ornithology; she began keeping a journal of detailed observations about the birds that populated the forests and farmland around her home. By 1890, Hine began contributing her data to scientific publications and wrote articles for various newspapers and journals. Not only did she read professional publications about ornithology, she also attended meeting with professionally accredited ornithologists. For instance, Hine attended a gathering of ornithologists in Indianapolis which was part of a bigger gathering of the American Association for the Advancement of Science in 1890.

Hine was also known for her advocacy for the conservation of and legal protection of Indiana's birds. Hine was a fervent supporter of the "Indiana Bird Law," which safeguarded insect-eating birds that were vital to the ecosystem, particularly specific tree species that were often used for lumber and orchard. She advocated by publishing poetry and articles and by making speeches to clubs and at the Farmers' Institutes in Waterloo and elsewhere in Indiana. The loudest of her opposition were the local farmers who, at the time, saw birds as pests and indiscriminately shot them to protect their crops. To combat this, Hine, through her writing and her talks, explained the significance of birds to the larger ecosystem and that birds ate the insects that also ruined crops. She saw great success in combining her scientific observations with colorful descriptions to increase the public's appreciation of birds.

She was a member of the National Ornithology Society. She was listed as a member of the Indiana Horticultural Society. She also belonged to the Literary Societies of Waterloo and Auburn, and to the Indiana Audubon Society.

== Death and legacy ==
On February 11, 1916, at the age of 84, Jane Lovisa Hine died in the home of her daughter in Sedan. She was buried at the Waterloo Cemetery. She was survived by her three stepson, one son, and one daughter.

In 2023, the Indiana Historical Bureau, in collaboration with the Town of Waterloo and the William G. Pomeroy Foundation, erected a State Historical Marker in dedication to Hine’s work as an ornithologist and her contributions to conservation efforts in the state.

== Selected publications ==
- Birds That Befriend Our Trees, 1893
- Farmers, Take Care of Your Birds, 1894
- Farm Birds in Northern Indiana, 1896
- The Story of the Wasp, 1902
- My Birds, 1904
- The Stars in the Night Hawk’s Wings, 1907
- Game and Land Birds of an Indiana Farm, 1911
