= Garrett Historic District =

Historic district in Indiana, United States

- U.S. National Register of Historic Places
- U.S. Historic district
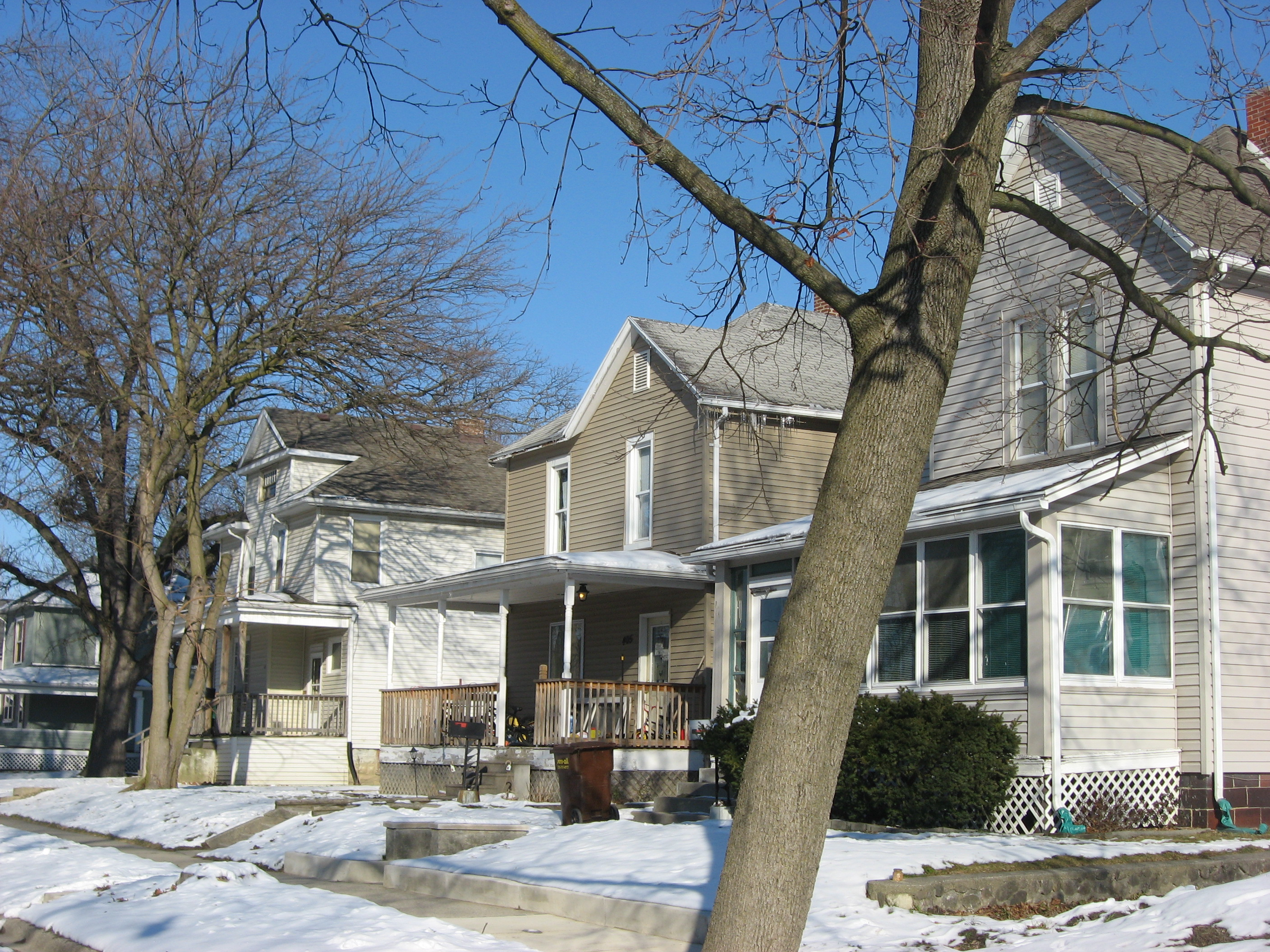
- Houses on Franklin Street

- Location within Indiana Location within the United States
- Location: Roughly bounded by Railroad, Britton, Warfield, and Hamsher Sts., and 3rd Ave., Garrett, Indiana
- Coordinates: 41°20′43″N 85°8′6″W
- Area: 283 acres (115 ha)
- Built: 1875
- Architect: Multiple
- Architectural style: Greek Revival, Italianate, Bungalow-Craftsman
- MPS: Keyser Township MRA
- NRHP reference No.: 83000121
- Added to NRHP: May 06, 1983

The Garrett Historic District is a national historic district located at Garrett, Indiana. It is roughly the area bound by Railroad Street on the North, Britton Street on the East, Hamsher Street on the West and Warfield Street on the South with Randolph Street extending to 3rd Ave. to the South. The district encompasses 925 contributing buildings in the central business district and surrounding residential sections of Garrett.

Within the District, there are many buildings dating back to the earliest days of the City of Garrett. Garrett City Hall, former Masonic Temple, Silver Screen Theater, Garret Clinic, Johnson Building, B&O Railroad Freight House, Mountz House and more. Just outside the District are many school houses and the Garrett-Keyser-Butler Community School District complex.

In 2008–2009, the downtown area of Garrett was fully revamped with vintage style lamps and decorative planters. All power lines were placed underground and new sidewalks with bricks were laid.

While many buildings have been torn down or lost over the years due to unsustainable damages, the District still boasts its heritage with the continuing renovation of buildings and other buildings being built or renovated to look like period buildings of the District's beginnings in 1875.
