= Keyser Township, DeKalb County, Indiana =

Keyser Township
- Township
- Location of Keyser Township in DeKalb County
- Coordinates: 41°21′03″N 85°08′06″W
- Country: United States
- State: Indiana
- County: DeKalb

Government
  - Type: Indiana township

Area
  - Total: 24.02 sq mi (62.2 km^{2})
  - Land: 23.96 sq mi (62.1 km^{2})
  - Water: 0.05 sq mi (0.13 km^{2})
- Elevation: 883 ft (269 m)

Population (2020)
  - Total: 7,853
  - Density: 319.9/sq mi (123.5/km^{2})
- FIPS code: 18-39636
- GNIS feature ID: 453525

Keyser Township is one of fifteen townships in DeKalb County, Indiana. As of the 2020 census, its population was 7,853, up from 7,666 at the 2010 census, and it contained 3,134 housing units.

== History ==
Keyser Township had its start in 1876, when the Baltimore and Ohio Railroad constructed a railroad through the area.

The Samuel Bevier House, Joseph Bowman Farmhouse, Breechbill-Davidson House, Brethren in Christ Church, Orin Clark House, DeKalb County Home and Barn, William Fountain House, Gump House, Edward Kelham House, Charles Lehmback Farmstead, Rakestraw House, and Henry Shull Farmhouse Inn were added to the National Register of Historic Places in 1983.

== Geography ==
According to the 2010 census, the township has a total area of 24.02 square miles (62.2 km^{2}), of which 23.96 square miles (62.1 km^{2}) (or 99.75%) is land and 0.05 square miles (0.13 km^{2}) (or 0.21%) is water.

=== Cities and towns ===
- Altona
- Auburn (west edge)
- Garrett

=== Adjacent townships ===
- Richland Township (north)
- Jackson Township (east)
- Union Township (east)
- Butler Township (south)
- Allen Township, Noble County (west)
- Swan Township, Noble County (west)

=== Major highways ===
- Interstate 69
- State Road 8
- State Road 327

=== Cemeteries ===
The township contains two cemeteries: Calvary and Embrey.
