= Garrett, Indiana =

City in Indiana, United States

- City
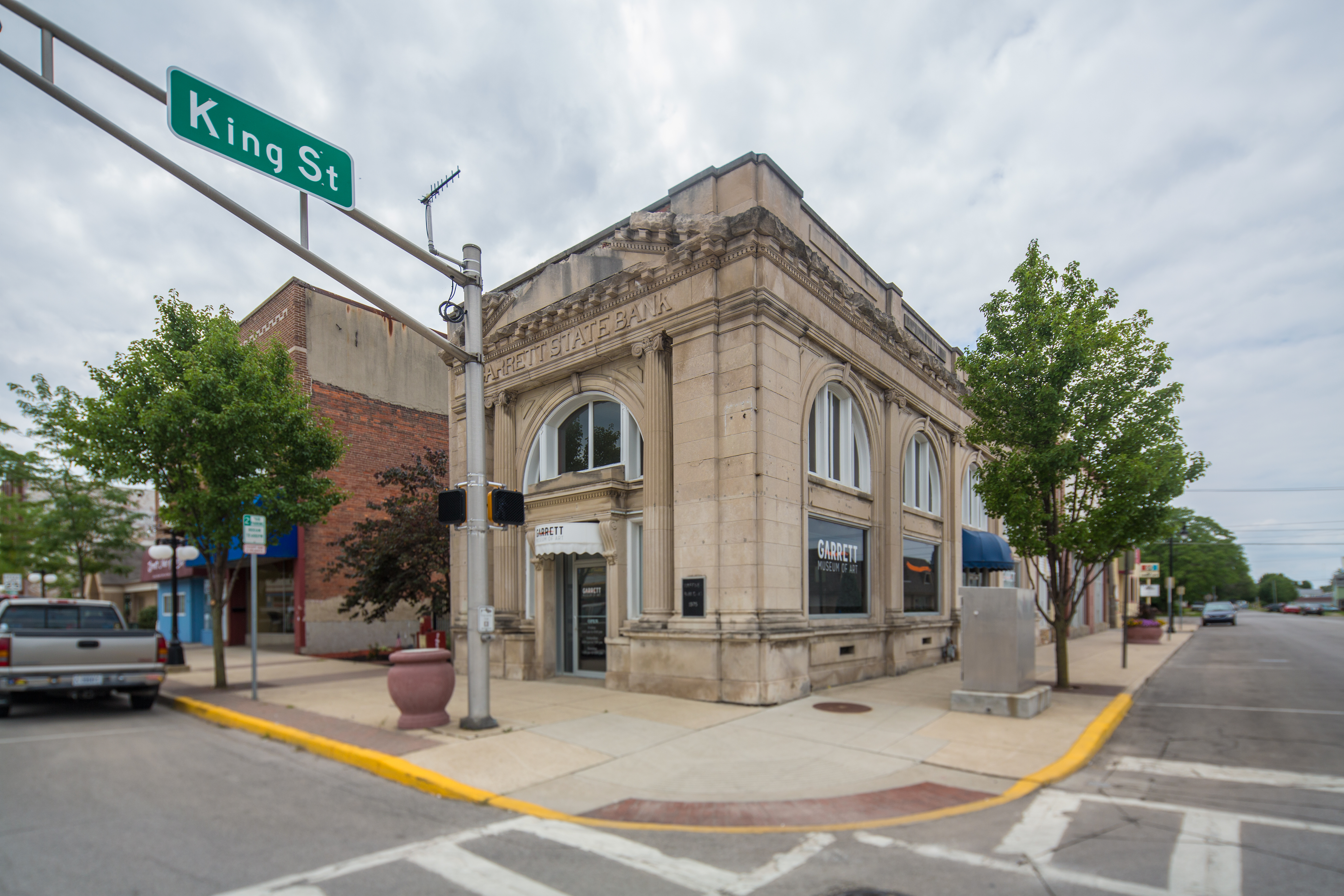

- Logo

- Location of Garrett in DeKalb County, Indiana.
- Coordinates: 41°20′52″N 85°08′01″W
- Country: United States
- State: Indiana
- County: DeKalb
- Township: Keyser

Government
  - Mayor: Todd Fiandt (D)

Area
  - Total: 4.17 sq mi (10.79 km^{2})
  - Land: 4.17 sq mi (10.79 km^{2})
  - Water: 0 sq mi (0.00 km^{2})
- Elevation: 883 ft (269 m)

Population (2020)
  - Total: 6,542
  - Density: 1,570.5/sq mi (606.37/km^{2})
- Time zone: UTC-5 (EST)
  - Summer (DST): UTC-4 (EDT)
- ZIP code: 46738
- Area code: 260
- FIPS code: 18-26386
- GNIS feature ID: 2394858
- Website: www.garrettindiana.us

Garrett is a city in Keyser Township, DeKalb County, Indiana, United States. As of the 2020 census, Garrett had a population of 6,542.

== History ==
Garrett was platted in 1875 when the Baltimore and Ohio Railroad was extended to that point. It was named for John W. Garrett, president of the Baltimore and Ohio Railroad from 1858 to 1884. Garrett was incorporated as a city in 1875.

== Geography ==
According to the 2010 census, Garrett has a total area of 3.85 square miles (9.97 km^{2}), all land.

Garrett sits just west of Auburn, a larger town and county seat of DeKalb County. Both cities are about 15 miles north of Fort Wayne.

=== Climate ===
Climate data for Garrett, Indiana (1991–2020 normals, extremes 1989–present)
Month	Jan	Feb	Mar	Apr	May	Jun	Jul	Aug	Sep	Oct	Nov	Dec	Year
Record high °F (°C)	65 (18)	73 (23)	84 (29)	85 (29)	93 (34)	102 (39)	101 (38)	97 (36)	97 (36)	90 (32)	78 (26)	67 (19)	102 (39)
Mean maximum °F (°C)	53.6 (12.0)	56.6 (13.7)	69.3 (20.7)	79.2 (26.2)	85.9 (29.9)	90.6 (32.6)	91.5 (33.1)	90.3 (32.4)	88.2 (31.2)	80.7 (27.1)	66.5 (19.2)	55.4 (13.0)	93.7 (34.3)
Mean daily maximum °F (°C)	30.2 (−1.0)	34.2 (1.2)	45.8 (7.7)	59.2 (15.1)	69.8 (21.0)	77.5 (25.3)	80.8 (27.1)	78.8 (26.0)	73.4 (23.0)	61.2 (16.2)	46.8 (8.2)	34.6 (1.4)	57.7 (14.3)
Daily mean °F (°C)	23.3 (−4.8)	26.4 (−3.1)	36.4 (2.4)	48.0 (8.9)	58.8 (14.9)	67.4 (19.7)	70.6 (21.4)	68.6 (20.3)	62.3 (16.8)	51.0 (10.6)	38.8 (3.8)	28.3 (−2.1)	48.3 (9.1)
Mean daily minimum °F (°C)	16.5 (−8.6)	18.6 (−7.4)	26.9 (−2.8)	36.7 (2.6)	47.7 (8.7)	57.3 (14.1)	60.3 (15.7)	58.4 (14.7)	51.2 (10.7)	40.8 (4.9)	30.8 (−0.7)	21.9 (−5.6)	38.9 (3.8)
Mean minimum °F (°C)	−6.0 (−21.1)	−0.9 (−18.3)	9.1 (−12.7)	22.1 (−5.5)	33.8 (1.0)	44.7 (7.1)	50.1 (10.1)	48.6 (9.2)	37.6 (3.1)	28.2 (−2.1)	16.5 (−8.6)	4.0 (−15.6)	−9.7 (−23.2)
Record low °F (°C)	−26 (−32)	−25 (−32)	−7 (−22)	11 (−12)	24 (−4)	37 (3)	42 (6)	42 (6)	28 (−2)	22 (−6)	4 (−16)	−18 (−28)	−26 (−32)
Average precipitation inches (mm)	2.52 (64)	2.28 (58)	2.68 (68)	4.02 (102)	4.73 (120)	3.95 (100)	3.52 (89)	3.90 (99)	3.22 (82)	3.01 (76)	3.10 (79)	2.59 (66)	39.52 (1,004)
Average snowfall inches (cm)	10.6 (27)	9.7 (25)	4.8 (12)	1.2 (3.0)	0.0 (0.0)	0.0 (0.0)	0.0 (0.0)	0.0 (0.0)	0.0 (0.0)	0.1 (0.25)	2.5 (6.4)	7.1 (18)	36.0 (91)
Average precipitation days (≥ 0.01 in)	11.6	9.5	10.2	11.8	11.6	9.9	8.8	8.5	7.6	9.4	9.5	10.8	119.2
Average snowy days (≥ 0.1 in)	8.7	7.0	3.9	1.2	0.0	0.0	0.0	0.0	0.0	0.1	2.5	6.3	29.7
Source: NOAA

== Demographics ==
Historical population
Census	Pop.	Note	%±
1880	1,268		—
1890	2,767		118.2%
1900	3,910		41.3%
1910	4,149		6.1%
1920	4,796		15.6%
1930	4,428		−7.7%
1940	4,285		−3.2%
1950	4,291		0.1%
1960	4,364		1.7%
1970	4,715		8.0%
1980	4,751		0.8%
1990	5,349		12.6%
2000	5,803		8.5%
2010	6,286		8.3%
2020	6,542		4.1%
U.S. Decennial Census

=== 2020 census ===
As of the 2020 census, Garrett had a population of 6,542. The median age was 35.6 years. 27.1% of residents were under the age of 18 and 14.0% of residents were 65 years of age or older. For every 100 females there were 94.0 males, and for every 100 females age 18 and over there were 92.5 males age 18 and over.

97.4% of residents lived in urban areas, while 2.6% lived in rural areas.

There were 2,490 households in Garrett, of which 34.9% had children under the age of 18 living in them. Of all households, 46.4% were married-couple households, 18.8% were households with a male householder and no spouse or partner present, and 24.9% were households with a female householder and no spouse or partner present. About 27.0% of all households were made up of individuals and 10.5% had someone living alone who was 65 years of age or older.

There were 2,617 housing units, of which 4.9% were vacant. The homeowner vacancy rate was 1.4% and the rental vacancy rate was 6.3%.

Racial composition as of the 2020 census
Race	Number	Percent
White	6,040	92.3%
Black or African American	28	0.4%
American Indian and Alaska Native	14	0.2%
Asian	25	0.4%
Native Hawaiian and Other Pacific Islander	24	0.4%
Some other race	42	0.6%
Two or more races	369	5.6%
Hispanic or Latino (of any race)	222	3.4%

=== 2010 census ===
As of the 2010 United States census, there were 6,286 people in the city of Garrett, Indiana. The city grew 8.32% since the 2000 United States census.

The city was 47.95% male (3,014) and 52.05% female (3,272).

The racial makeup of the city was:

Race	Number of Citizens	Percentage of Population
White	6,028	95.90%
Identified by two or more	97	1.54%
Other	73	1.16%
African American	28	0.45%
Asian	28	0.45%
American Indian and Alaskan Native	26	0.41%
Native Hawaiian and Pacific Islander	6	0.10%

The age of the population was:

Age	Number of Citizens	Percentage of Population
Under 18	1,836	29.20%
18 & Over	4,450	71.80%
20-24	370	5.89%
25-34	866	13.78%
35-49	1,309	20.82%
50-64	1,023	16.27%
65 & Over	701	11.15%

=== 2000 census ===
As of the census of 2000, there were 5,803 people, 2,185 households, and 1,516 families residing in the city. The population density was 1,856.5 inhabitants per square mile (716.8/km^{2}). There were 2,364 housing units at an average density of 756.3 per square mile (292.0/km^{2}). The racial makeup of the city was 97.47% White, 0.29% African American, 0.33% Native American, 0.50% Asian, 0.16% Pacific Islander, 0.62% from other races, and 0.64% from two or more races. Hispanic or Latino of any race were 2.07% of the population.

There were 2,185 households, out of which 36.8% had children under the age of 18 living with them, 52.9% were married couples living together, 12.1% had a female householder with no husband present, and 30.6% were non-families. 25.6% of all households were made up of individuals, and 10.9% had someone living alone who was 65 years of age or older. The average household size was 2.63 and the average family size was 3.15.

In the city, the population was spread out, with 28.7% under the age of 18, 9.7% from 18 to 24, 31.1% from 25 to 44, 19.1% from 45 to 64, and 11.3% who were 65 years of age or older. The median age was 32 years. For every 100 females, there were 94.5 males. For every 100 females age 18 and over, there were 92.5 males.

The median income for a household in the city was $41,747, and the median income for a family was $48,403. Males had a median income of $35,814 versus $22,389 for females. The per capita income for the city was $17,260. About 4.1% of families and 6.0% of the population were below the poverty line, including 6.0% of those under age 18 and 11.7% of those age 65 or over.

== Education ==
The city of Garrett lies in the school district of Garrett-Keyser-Butler Community Schools. Local schools are:

Type	Name	Grades
Public	J.E. Ober Elementary	K–5
Public	Garrett Middle School	6–8
Public	Garrett High School	9–12
Private (Catholic Parochial)	St. Joseph School	K–6

The town is served by the Garrett Public Library, one of four public libraries in Dekalb County.

== Buildings ==
The Garrett Community Mausoleum, Garrett Historic District, J.H. Haag House, Keyser Township School 8, Mountz House, Henry Peters House, and John Wilderson House are listed on the National Register of Historic Places.

St. Joseph Catholic church, built in 1929 is part of the Roman Catholic Diocese of Fort Wayne-South Bend, is an Italian-style church, more than a century old. It operates St. Joseph Catholic School in Garrett and previously managed Sacred Heart Hospital.

Sacred Heart Hospital, standing at 220 South Ijams St, was built in 1902. It was run by nuns from the Order of the Franciscan Sisters of the Sacred Heart. It became the Garrett Community Hospital when the sisters stopped managing the hospital. The structure was listed on the National Register of Historic Places in 1983.

For years, the building remained largely unused until renovated in 2003. It had forty-two apartments for senior citizens. In 2010, the residency requirement were changed allowing the population at large to have access to the Sacred Heart Apartments. The facility is currently managed by New Generation Management based in Fort Wayne.

In 2005 the DeKalb County YMCA Community Center was opened at 1200 East Houston St. Which is now called the Judy A. Morrill center or The JAM. This facility was designed and built with the community in mind. There is a zero entry pool, allowing handicapped individuals to use a ramp to enter the pool. This pool also offers a water slide and splash pads for children. The fitness room provides free weights, aerobic machines, and weight machines. There is also a large gymnasium and playground at the facility. Daycare and after school services are available for families.

In January 2011 control of the facility changed to become the Judy A. Morrill Recreation Center, or J.A.M. Rec Center. Many classes and activities are offered, including scrap-booking, Yoga, swimming and fitness classes, bingo, and more.

Another important landmark in the city is its Garrett Fire Department, which originally had its headquarters in the City Hall. Until joining with the Police Department to make a new station in 1996. The GFD has been saving life and property in Garrett and the surrounding communities since 1879.

The Creek Chub Bait Company was founded in Garrett in 1916 after the founders, Henry Dills, Carl Heinzerling, and George Schulthess had originally conceived the company a decade prior in 1906. Creek Chub baits and lures remain popular among collectors and a historical marker was set up in 2017 where the factory had been before it was taken down.

== High school and athletics ==
Garrett High School has been around since 1922. In 2001, a new middle school section of the school was completed and added to the existing school. In 2011, the school began construction on yet another new section of the building. This new section greatly increased the size of the high school. The section was finished in early 2013. Garrett has been one of the highest ranked schools in Northern Indiana. Garrett's motto is to "Be The One". The high-school teams all play 3A in the Northeast Corner Conference, while the middle school plays in the Tri-County Athletic Conference and the Jr.- NECC. Their team mascot is a Locomotive and the high school are called the Railroaders. The middle school goes by the Locomotives.

== Newspaper ==
The Garrett Clipper, serving the Garrett and area community in southern DeKalb County, Indiana, was purchased by KPC Media Group Inc. on October 1, 1999. The Clipper of Garrett was formed in 1885 by A.J. Little and H. E. Little and is the oldest operating business in the city.

== Notable people ==
- John Bowers - silent film star, was born and raised in Garrett.
- George E. Mountz - lawyer and naval intelligence officer from Garrett who investigated Japanese war crimes in the Second World War; partial namesake of the historic Mountz House in Garrett.
- Wayne Schurr - former pitcher for the Chicago Cubs.
- Thomas Taggart - mayor of Indianapolis, 1895–1901, lived in Garrett, 1874–1877
- Rollie Zeider - major league baseball player, 1910–1918

=== Gallery ===
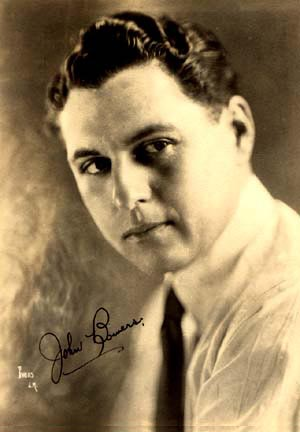
John Bowers

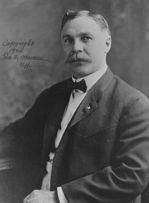
Thomas Taggart

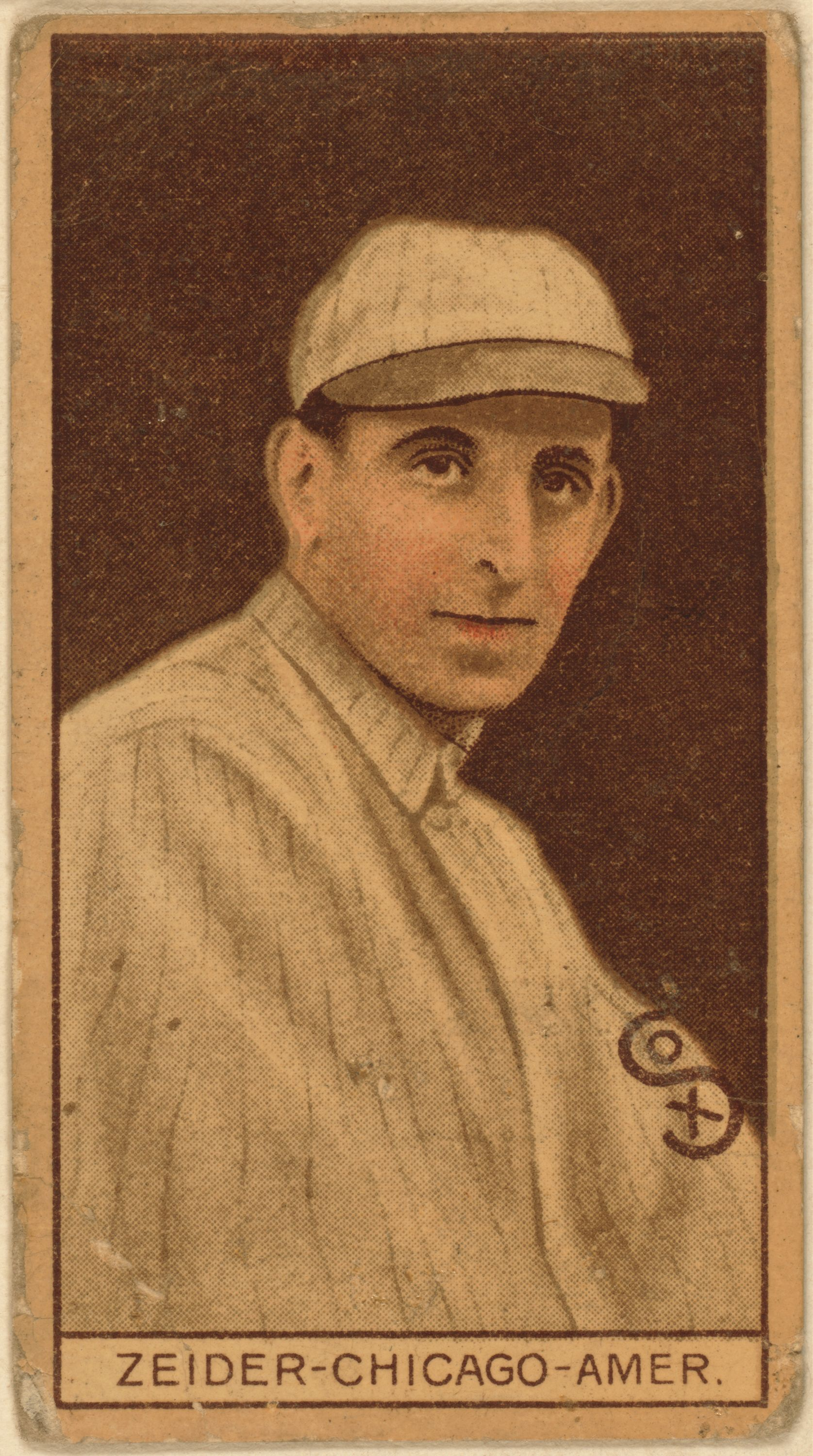
Rollie Zeider
