= Auburn Rubber Company =

Ruber Company, best known for toys

The Auburn Rubber Company was a rubber products manufacturer best known for its line of children's toys. It was probably the largest producer of rubber and vinyl toys in the world, though Norway's Tomte Laerdal, Finland's Plasto, and Sweden's Galanite were major European producers.

== History ==
The Double Fabric Tire Company was started in Auburn, Indiana, in 1913. At the outset, Double Fabric made tires for the Auburn Automobile Company. In the 1920s, the name was changed to the Auburn Rubber Company. It phased out its production of tires and introduced new products such as rubber sheets used to sole shoes. In 1935, it began making rubber toys, including a variety of toy cars, trucks, tractors and animals. Most vehicles were four to eight inches in length and cast in a variety of colors. During World War II, the company continued to make soles – now for combat boots – and also gaskets for so-called "jerry cans."

== Vehicles ==
Toys were made in many different styles, models and sizes. Proportion and detail were fairly good for vinyl toys. Probably the most famous were the four inch variety. Some of the model selections were clever and well done (for rubber) such as a 1955 Thunderbird, a Triumph TR-2, 1955 Mercedes-Benz 300SL, a 1957 Ford Ranchero, and perhaps the most famous Auburn Rubber offering, a neat Ford Model A-style Hot Rod.

One sports car appeared to be a cross between a Cunningham and an Aston Martin. One convertible's fins and dagmar bullets looked mainly like a Cadillac. Another odd sedan had fins like a Pontiac, a front grille like a Kaiser Traveller, with the general shape of a forward-look Chrysler. Utility and service vehicles in the small size were also popular such as a fire engine, a telephone truck with two ladders on top (it looked like a Dodge), and a flat bed truck. Police cars (molded in blue) and fire chief cars (molded in red) appeared to be variations on 1955 Chevrolets. What appeared to be a policeman on a Triumph single cylinder motorcycle also was popular, and there was also a Harley three-wheeler. One of the more clever vehicles was a boy molded in a waving position on a tricycle.

Models were simply constructed, typically only 7 parts: the body, four wheels, and two metal axles with flared tips to keep the wheels in place. The wheels were a slightly harder vinyl and were usually molded in either black or yellow. One popular coloring feature was the application of sprayed on silver coatings for the windows, grilles, bumpers, and other highlighted areas. Peoples' faces in bas relief style would often be molded into the windows of the cars – and often separate views were seen from the driver's side to the passenger side. Entire torsos were often molded into the open interiors of convertibles or roadsters. Similar to other plastic or vinyl vehicles of the era, the toys were often shipped and sold with many vehicles clumped together in a single box – so the buyer could walk away with the vehicle of his choice – cars and trucks were not sold in their own individual packages.

Cars and trucks were also molded in larger sizes, from about five inches up to about ten inches or so. These appeared both as cars and trucks / utility vehicles. Larger cars included an Indianapolis style open wheel racer, a 1957 Cadillac Eldorado convertible, a less realistic Cadillac-style 'station wagon', and also a 1955 Plymouth station wagon airport limousine with nine different people molded into the windows. Utility vehicles produced were a detailed fire truck, a variety of tractors and farm implements, a road grader and other construction vehicles, an articulated cab and stake bed truck. Tanks and airplanes were a staple, and many other more fantastic creations were also produced.

== Other Toys ==
In a more traditional vein, an antique style wagon with horses was also offered. Toy soldiers, cowboys, trees, farm animals, farm buildings, and even farm implements were also molded in a variety of colors, initially in rubber and later in plastic. A life-sized horseshoe game (as they were rubber, they didn't do as much damage when one was hit in the head) was labeled as Auburn "safe play" toys.

== Company Directions ==
The toy company was sold in 1959 and dies were moved to Deming, New Mexico, in a transaction described by author Jonathan Kwitny (1979) in his book, Vicious Circles: The Mafia in the Marketplace, as an example of the penetration of a legitimate business by organized crime. The former plant in Auburn was eventually acquired by Cooper Tire & Rubber Company and is now used by Continental Rubber company . Auburn Rubber in Deming went out of business in 1969, and its toy cars could be found in retail stores through the early 1970s. The Deming toys are probably the Auburn Rubber products most often seen for sale at flea markets or on eBay today.
