= Eckhart Public Library and Park =

- U.S. National Register of Historic Places
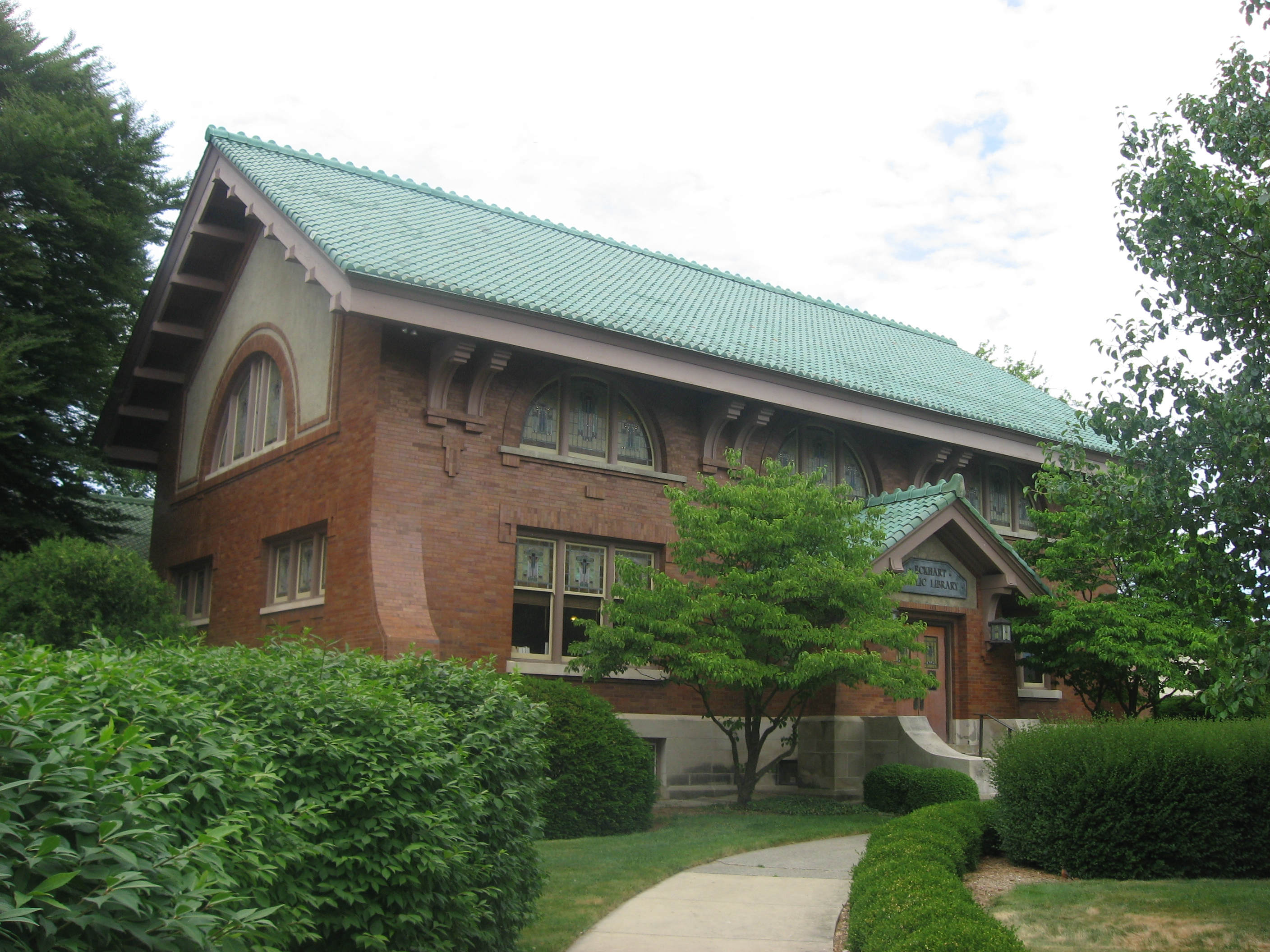
- Eckhart Public Library, May 2012

- Location within Indiana Location within the United States
- Location: 603 S. Jackson St., Auburn, Indiana
- Coordinates: 41°21′50″N 85°03′27″W
- Area: 1.5 acres (0.61 ha)
- Built: 1911
- Built by: Long, J. Perry
- Architect: Patton & Miller
- Architectural style: Bungalow/craftsman
- NRHP reference No.: 81000009
- Added to NRHP: November 20, 1981

Eckhart Public Library and Park is a historic library building and public park located at Auburn, Indiana. The library was built in 1911, and is a two-story, glazed brick building with Bungalow / American Craftsman design elements. It has a gable roof, round arched windows, and sits on a raised basement faced with Bedford limestone. The library and park were donated by Charles Eckhart. Located in the park is a contributing fountain added in 1918.

It was added to the National Register of Historic Places in 1981.

The Eckhart Public Library remains in operation today as one of four libraries serving Dekalb County.
