= Auburn Community Mausoleum =

Historic site in DeKalb County, Indiana

- U.S. National Register of Historic Places
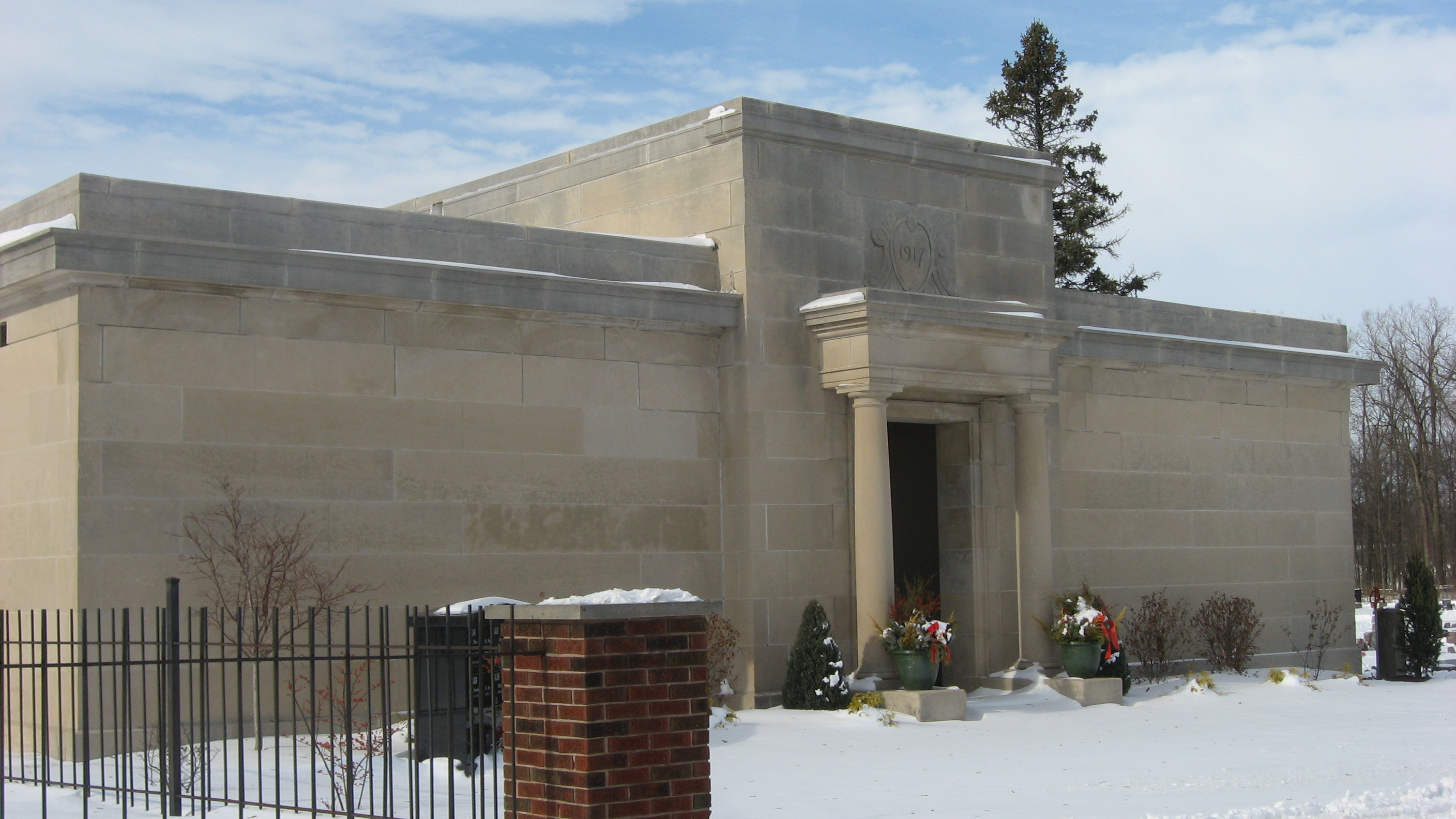
- Auburn Community Mausoleum, January 2014

- Location within Indiana Location within the United States
- Location: 1431 Center St., Auburn, Indiana
- Coordinates: 41°22′00″N 85°03′18″W
- Area: less than 1 acre (0.40 ha)
- Built: 1917
- Architect: Ohio Mausoleum Company; Bryan, Cecil E.
- Architectural style: Classical Revival
- MPS: The Early Community Mausoleum Movement in Indiana
- NRHP reference No.: 14000069
- Added to NRHP: March 24, 2014

Auburn Community Mausoleum is a historic mausoleum located in Roselawn Cemetery at Auburn, Indiana. It was built in 1917, and is a one-story, monolithic cubic limestone structure with simple Classical Revival style detail. It features a shallow porch with two Doric order columns. The mausoleum continued to be used for interments into the 1960s.

This was the third community mausoleum constructed in DeKalb County. Community mausolea had only gained popularity a few years prior, with a national movement to construct these types of buildings beginning in neighboring Ohio in the early 20th century. Many prominent DeKalb County residents are interred here, including Dr. Lida Powers Leasure (first female school superintendent in Indiana and the first woman elected to statewide public office in the state), Roy Faulkner (final president of the Auburn Automobile Company), and Wilford Rettig (an aviator and veteran of the First World War).

It was added to the National Register of Historic Places in 2014.
