= Downtown Auburn Historic District =

Historic district in Indiana, United States

- U.S. National Register of Historic Places
- U.S. Historic district
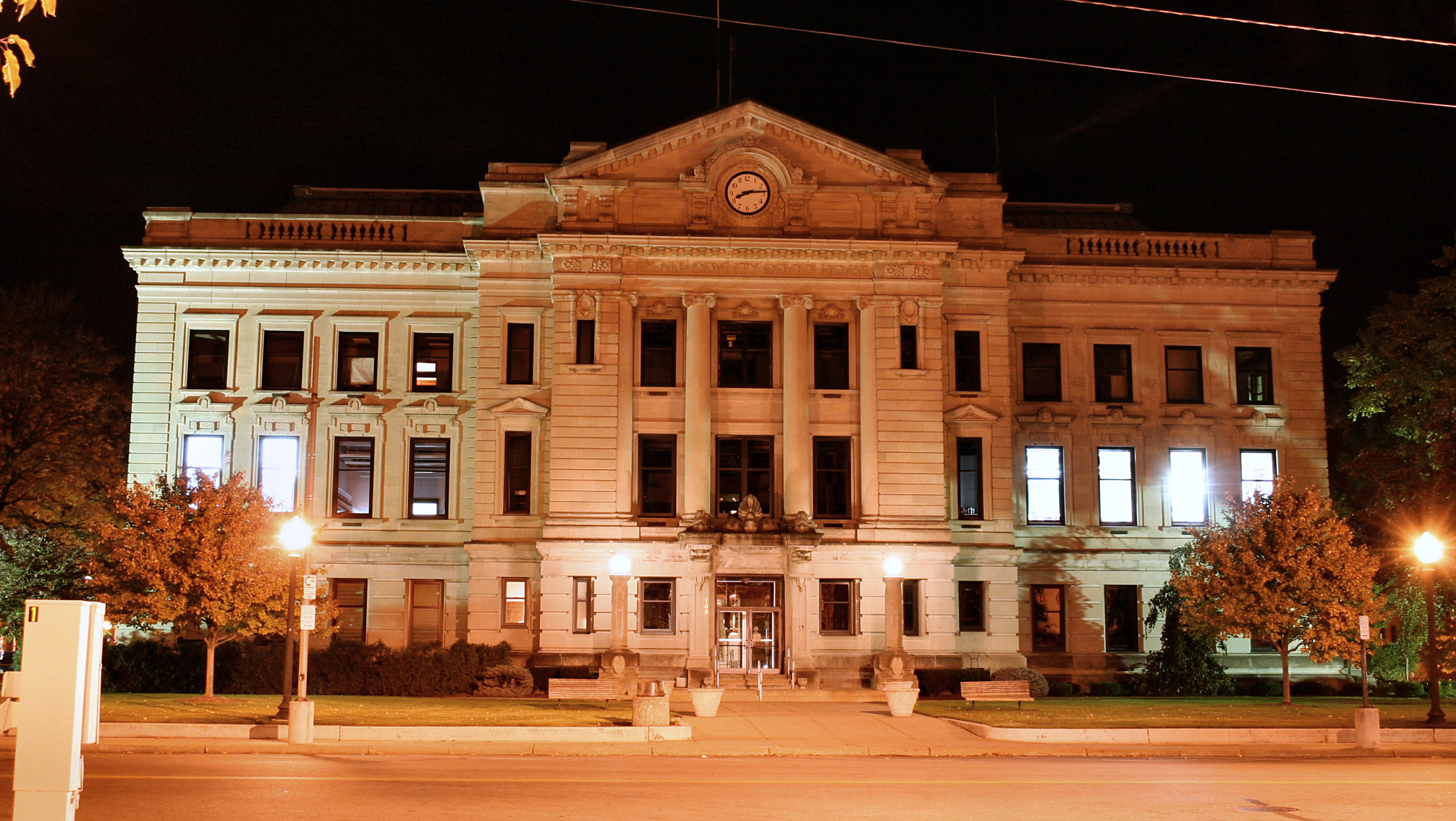
- DeKalb County Courthouse, October 2005

- Location within Indiana Location within the United States
- Location: Roughly bounded by E. and W. Fourth, N. and S. Cedar, E. Twelfth, and N. and S. Jackson Sts., Auburn, Indiana
- Coordinates: 41°22′00″N 85°03′18″W
- Area: 25 acres (10 ha)
- Built: 1870
- Architect: Mahurin & Mahurin; Et al.
- Architectural style: Classical Revival, Late Victorian, Romanesque Revival; Colonial Revival
- NRHP reference No.: 86002858
- Added to NRHP: September 10, 1986

Downtown Auburn Historic District is a national historic district located at Auburn, Indiana. The district encompasses 52 contributing buildings in the central business district of Auburn. The district developed between about 1870 and 1935, and includes notable examples of Victorian, Classical Revival, Romanesque Revival, and Colonial Revival style architecture. Notable buildings include the DeKalb County Courthouse (1911–1914), Henry Opera House (1917), DeKalb County Jail (1918), Commercial Club (1917), Auburn City Hall (1913), South Interurban Station (c. 1910), Dilgard Building (c. 1920–1930), Y.M.C.A. Building (1913–1914), Auburn Hotel (1922), U.S. Post Office (1934), and Masonic Temple (c. 1922).

It was added to the National Register of Historic Places in 1986.
