= McIntyre Automobile =

Defunct American motor vehicle manufacturer

W. H. McIntyre Company
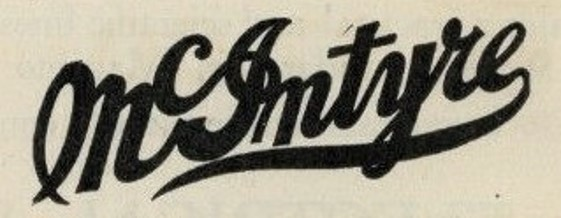
- "The right car for the most people."

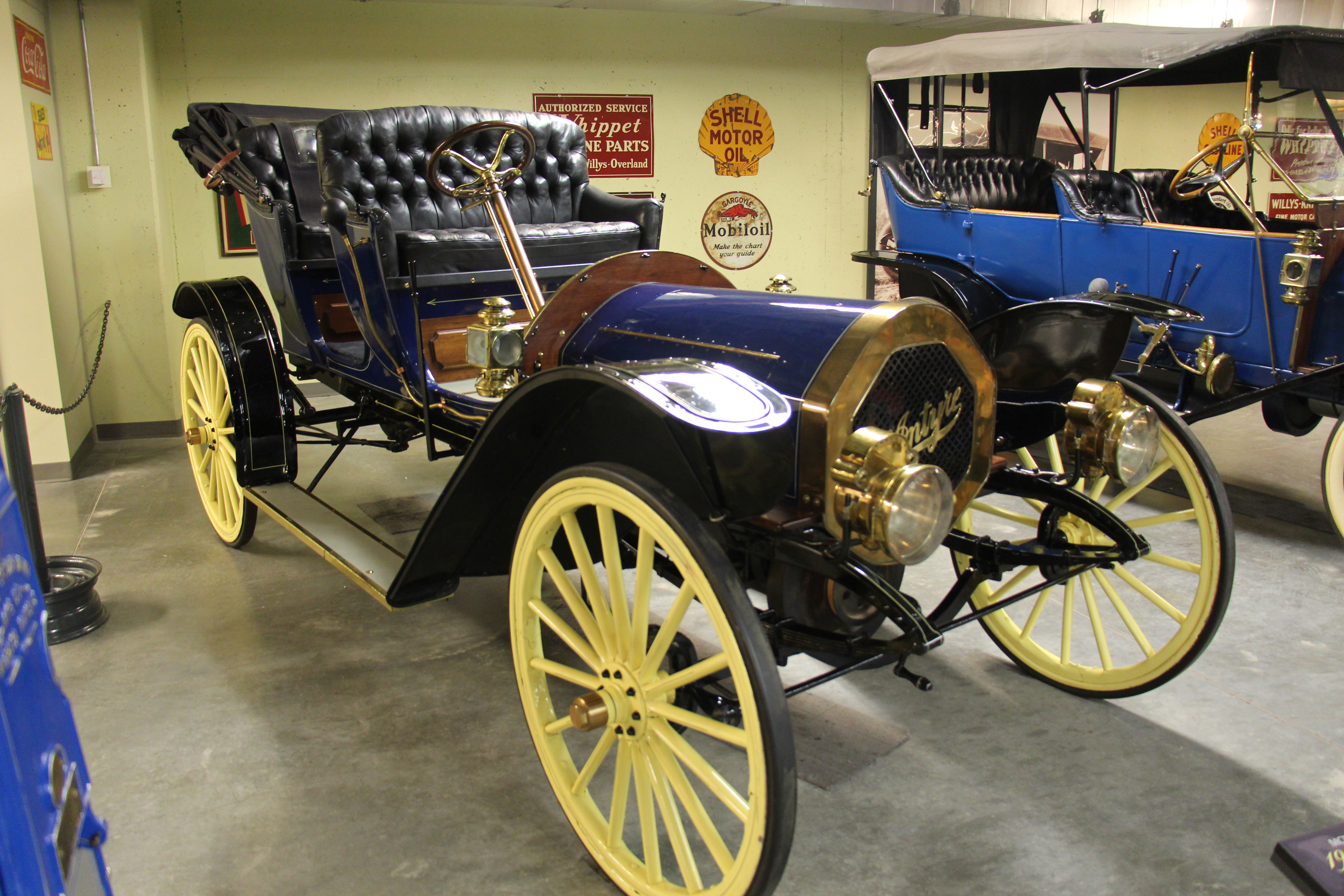
- 1909 McIntyre Model M Runabout
- Predecessor: W. H. Kiblinger Company Auburn, Indiana
- Founded: 1909; 117 years ago
- Founder: William H. McIntyre
- Defunct: 1915; 111 years ago
- Fate: Bankruptcy
- Successor: DeKalb Manufacturing Company, Fort Wayne, Indiana
- Headquarters: Auburn, Indiana, United States
- Products: Automobiles, Automotive parts
- Production output: 2,048 (1907-1915)
- Brands: Kiblinger, McIntyre, IMP

The W. H. Kiblinger Company and the W. H. McIntyre Company produced Brass Era automobiles in Auburn, Indiana, from 1907 to 1915.

== History ==
=== Kiblinger ===
The W. H. Kiblinger Company formed in 1887, manufactured buggies. After W. H. Kiblinger's death in 1894, William H. McIntyre co-purchased the company and began experimenting with automobiles as early as 1897. In 1907 Kiblinger began selling high-wheelers with tiller steering and two-cylinder air-cooled engines as the Kiblinger. Prices started at $250 (equivalent to $8,638 in 2025), which the company claimed was the "lowest price successful automobile on the road'

The company grew to occupy a total of five buildings around Auburn, Indiana, and employed 400 men. After producing a few hundred Kiblingers, the company building the Success high-wheeler sued Kiblinger for patent infringement. William H. McIntyre resolved the lawsuit by buying out the Kiblinger partners and forming the W. H. McIntyre Company in December, 1908.

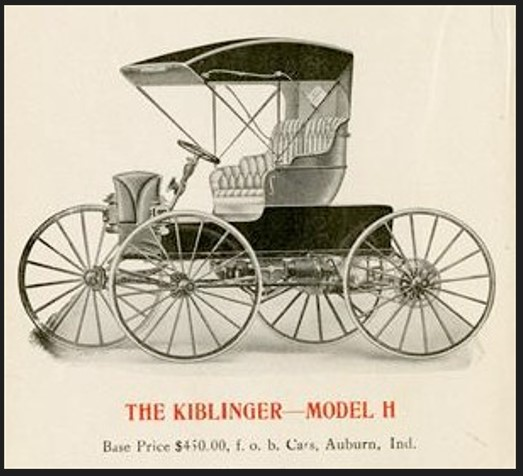
1907 Kiblinger Model H Advertisement

=== McIntyre ===
W. H. McIntyre Company manufactured both buggies and high-wheelers. A line of two and four-cylinder high-wheelers on a non-patent infringing design, were offered. The McIntyre high-wheeler line of runabouts, tourers and trucks increased until ten different models were available. By 1911, McIntyre introduced a line of standard vehicles by taking over the 4-cylinder 40-hp America produced by the Motor Car Company (New York City), which was marketed as the McIntyre Special. The six-cylinder 40-hp McIntyre Limited was added for 1913, but McIntyre was viewed as a high-wheeler manufacturer and these cars did not sell well.

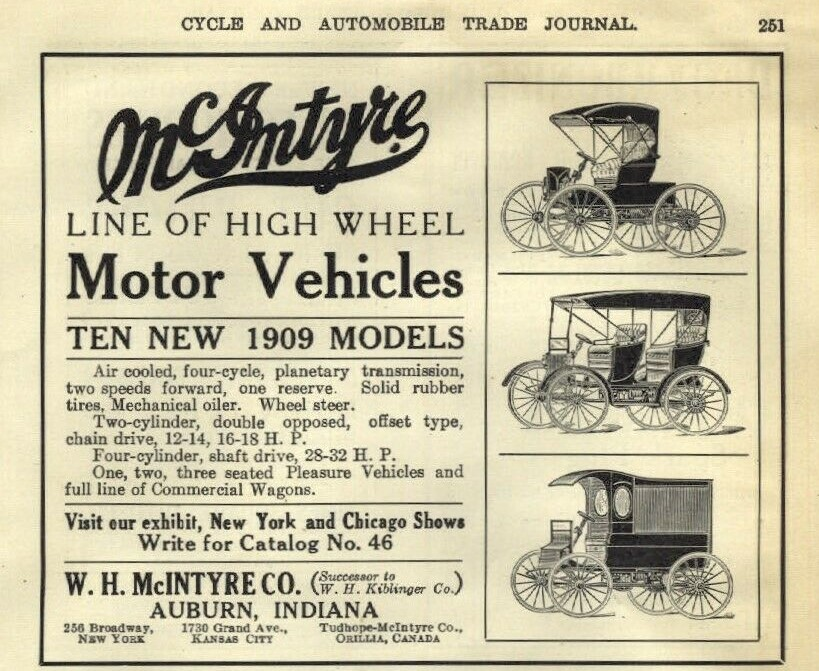
1908 full-line McIntyre advertisement

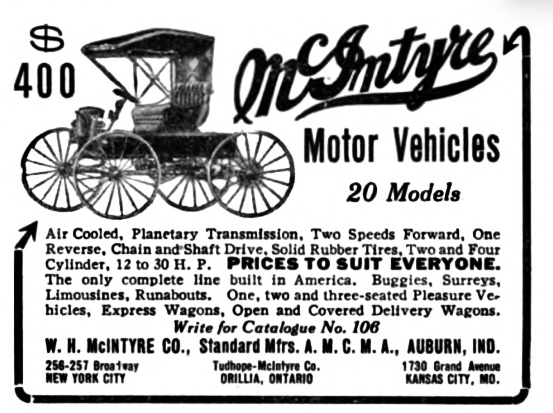
1909 McIntyre advertisement

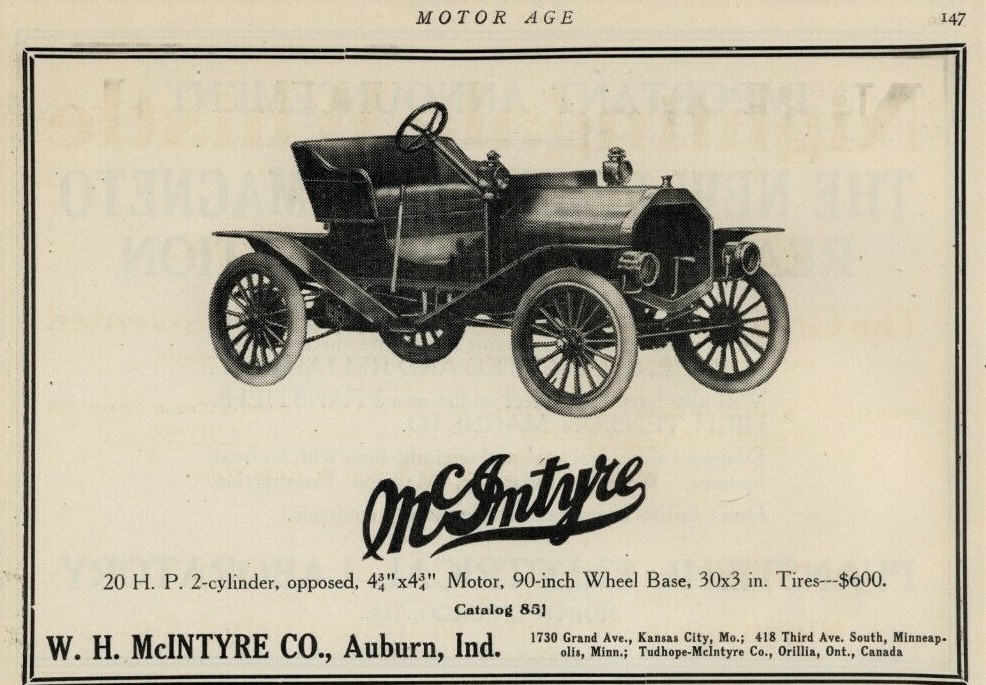
1910 McIntyre 20-hp advertisement

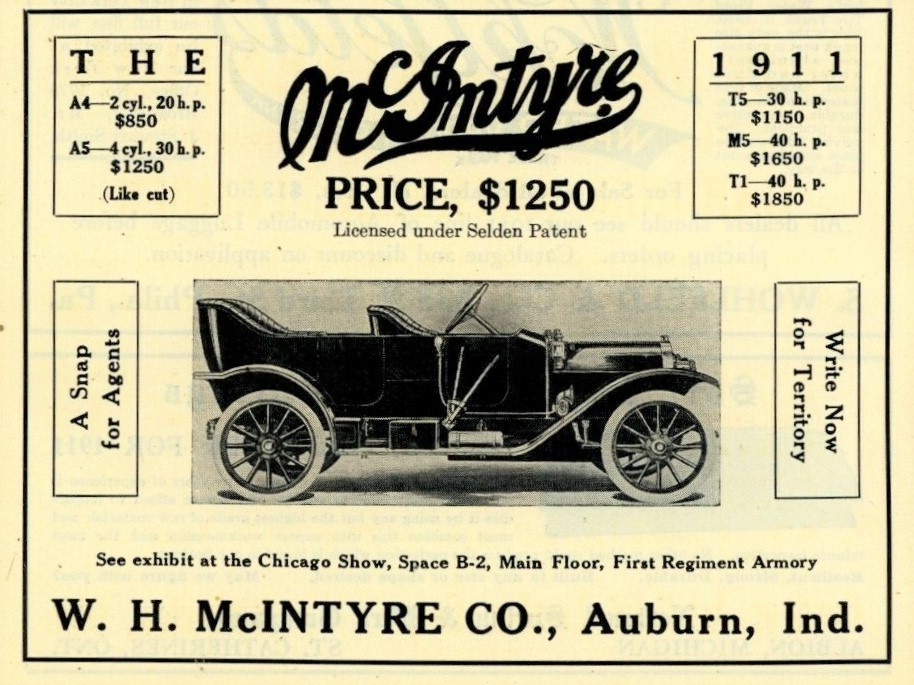
1911 McIntyre Special advertisement

== IMP Cyclecar ==
In 1913 McIntyre introduced the IMP Cyclecar with a 15-horsepower V-twin engine designed by William Stout . McIntyre IMP's sold for $375, (equivalent to $12,216 in 2025) and the sales literature stated that they cost "just a 'penny a mile' to run!" Although IMP's sold well, over fifty companies had been formed during the "cyclecar craze" and by 1914 sales were ending.

In 1914 McIntyre made a model 4-25 light car based on the IMP but production of all McIntyres soon ended.

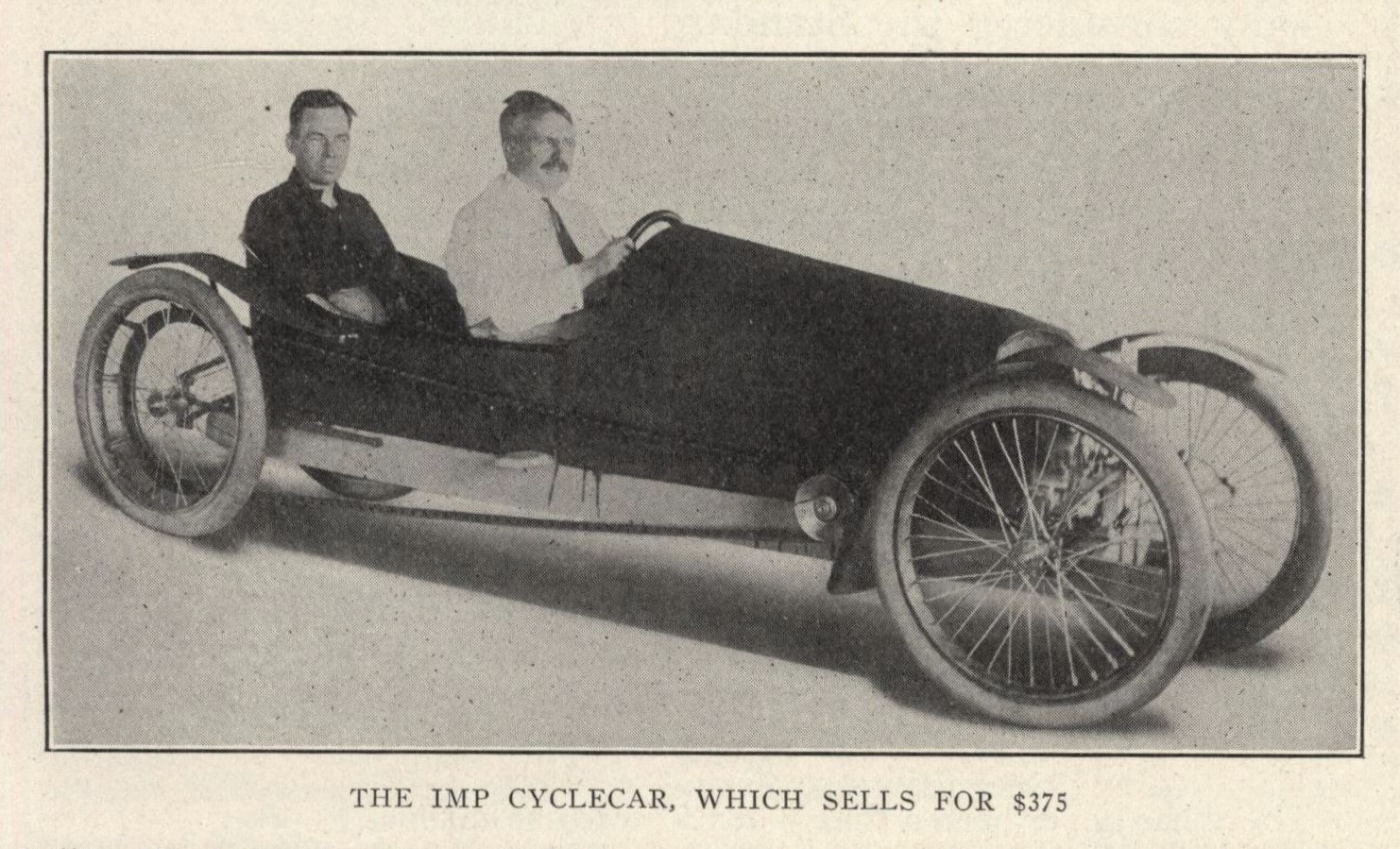
1913 IMP Cyclecar Advertisement

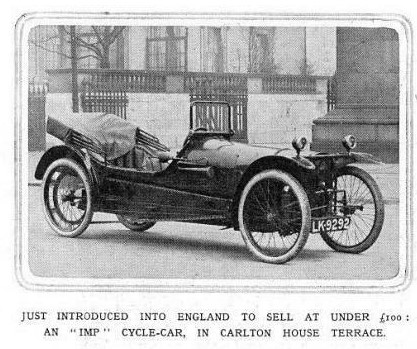
1914 IMP Cyclecar in London

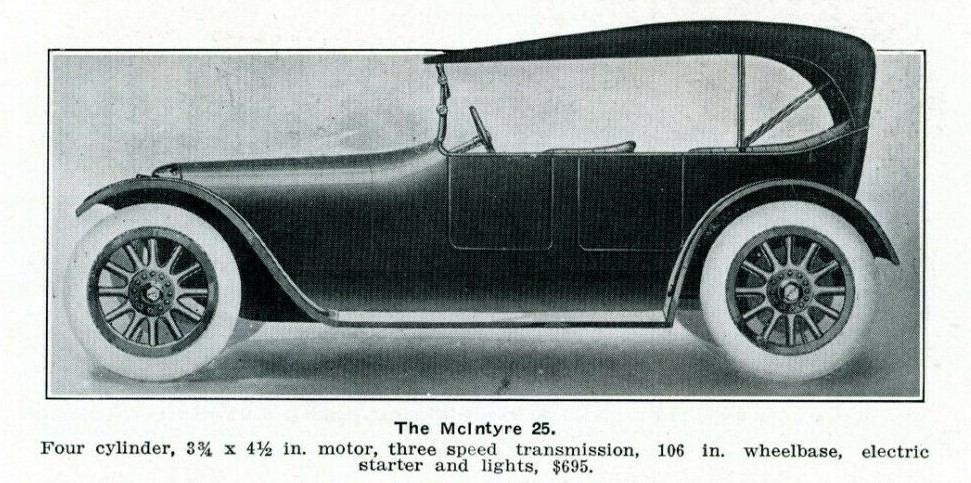
1915 McIntyre Model 25 advertisement

== Tudhope-McIntyre ==
James B. Tudhope of the Tudhope Carriage Companyin Orillia, Ontario, formed the Tudhope-McIntyre Company to build high-wheelers in 1908. Automobile parts were supplied from the W.H. McIntyre Company and the bodies were made by Tudehope's carriage company.Tudhope-McIntyres were priced at $550 CAD and production reached 514 vehicles before a fire in August 1909 destroyed the carriage factory. Rebuilding from the fire, Tudhope decided to discontinue high-wheeler production and instead acquired a license to build the Everitt 30.

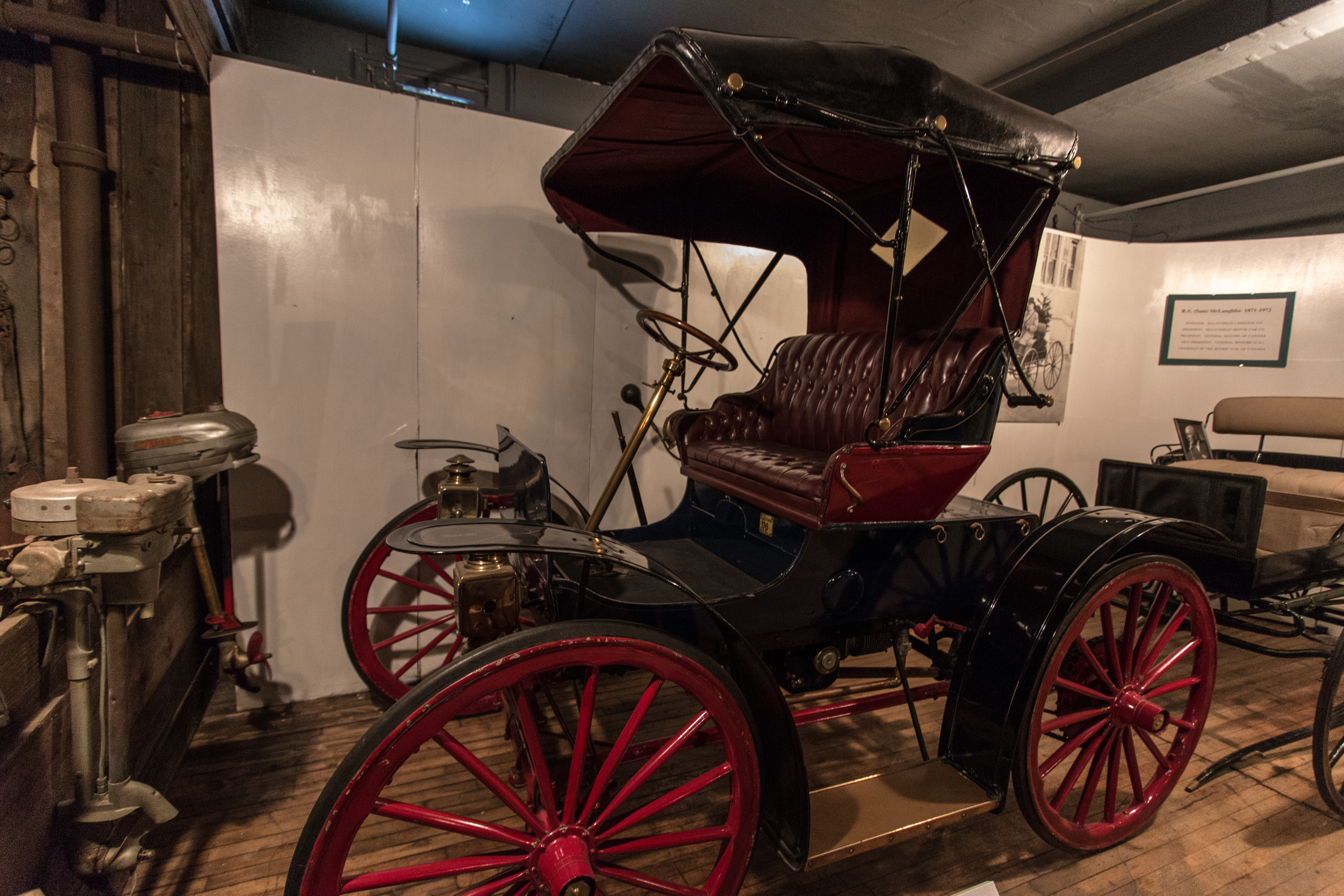
1908 Tudhope-McIntyre at the Canadian Automotive Museum

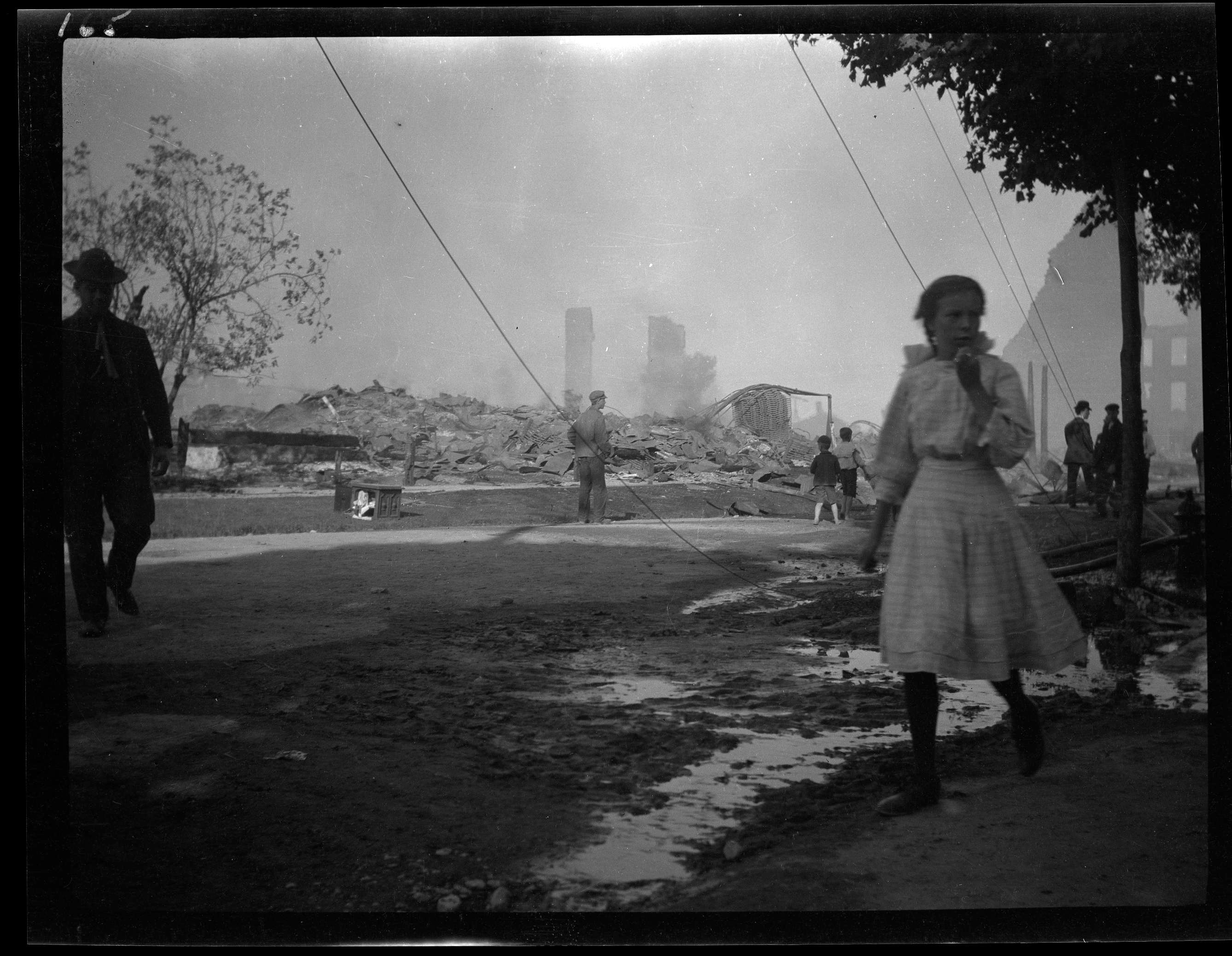
1909 Tudehope factory fire, Orillia, Ontario

== Model Overview, 1907–1915 ==
Year	Model	Engine type / Cyl.	Power bhp (kW)	Wheelbase in	Cost
1907-1908	Kiblinger High-wheeler	2-cyl.	4 to 10 HP	65	$250 - $450
1908-1911	McIntyre High-wheeler	2-cyl., 4-cyl.	12 to 18.2 hp	69.5 to 75	$450 - $775
1911-1915	McIntyre Special	4-cyl.	30 bhp (22 kW)	112	$850-$1,125
1913-1914	IMP Cyclecar	2-cyl.	15 hp	100	$375
1913-1915	McIntyre Limited	6-cyl.	40 hp	120	$1,485-$1,275
1915	McIntyre Model 4-25	4-cyl,	25 hp	106	$695

== Fate ==
With slowing sales, by January 1915 the W. H. McIntyre Company was in receivership. The DeKalb Manufacturing Company purchased the assets and assembled some cars for another two years.
