= Galanite =

Swedish vinyl and plastic company

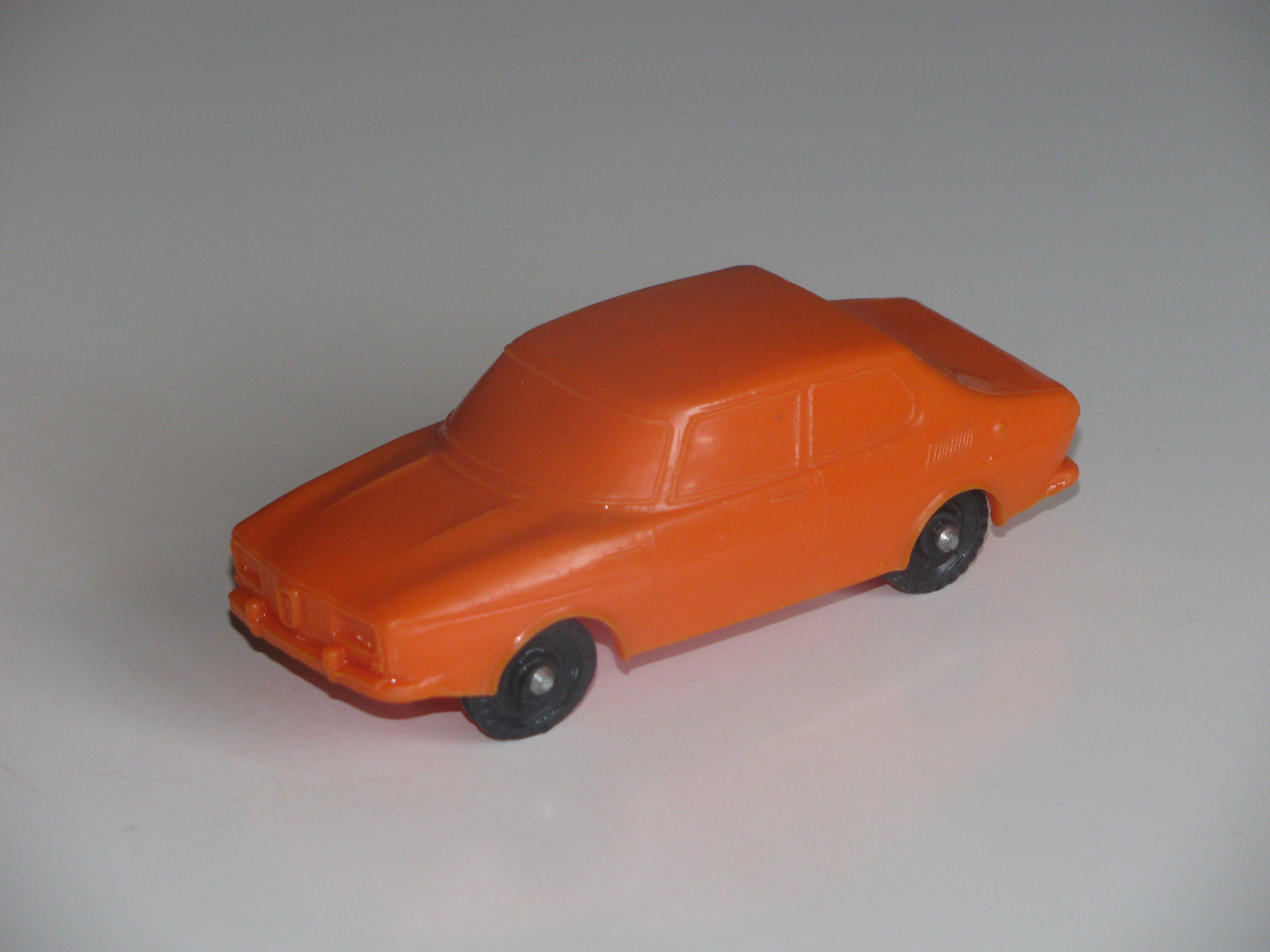
A Galanite diecast Saab 99 coupe. Though plastic, proportions were accurate and details surprising.

Svenska Galanite Industri, usually known simply as Galanite, was a Swedish vinyl and plastic company based in Löddeköpinge, which made mostly toys. Cars were the most popular, but trucks, farm vehicles and airplanes and toy dishes such as tea sets were also produced.

== History ==
The plastics company Galanite was started in 1947 by two Danish immigrants to Sweden named Ludwig Hawaleschka and Børge Hansen. The first product was a transparent ball with an angel inside. Galanite became a supplier of plastic parts for industry, including supplying parts for Volvo. Their toy cars, however, soon became the mainstay of the company. When the company prospered in the late 1950s and through the 1960s, it employed 125 people (Plastibar site). Varied plastics were used; soft PVC (for toys), polyethylene and polystyrene.

== Toy type ==
Most Galanite cars produced were in the four inch range at a scale of 1:42, but the company also made large pedal cars. Swedish vehicles were common like Volvo, Saab, and Scania trucks, possibly related to Galanite's parts and promotional connections, but Volkswagens and other vehicles like Mercedes Benz and the BMC Mini were also made. Like most rubber vehicles, construction was of only seven parts: a molded vinyl body, two metal axles, and four plastic tires. These toys were child friendly - soft vinyl, rounded edges and fun colours.

Other Galanite Toys were of a larger proportion (1:30) and had a less realistic design, with some of the cleaner edges of the true design of a car softened or abstracted for instance. Models are not numbered on the bottom and usually simply say "Galanite Sweden".

== Almost promotionals ==
Approximate dates of production for Galanite Toys were the late 1960s through the 1970s. Items produced are similar in concept to what Tomte Laerdal produced in Norway, or what Auburn Rubber Company produced in the United States, but Galanite cars ware injection moulding vinyl.

Some examples were exceptionally detailed for vinyl such as the SAAB 96 with a very accurate front end, accurate body proportions and SAAB logo on the trunk lid. The model almost appears to be a company promotional, but none approach the detail of Finnish Stahlberg Models which were purpose built as promotional models for SAAB and Volvo.

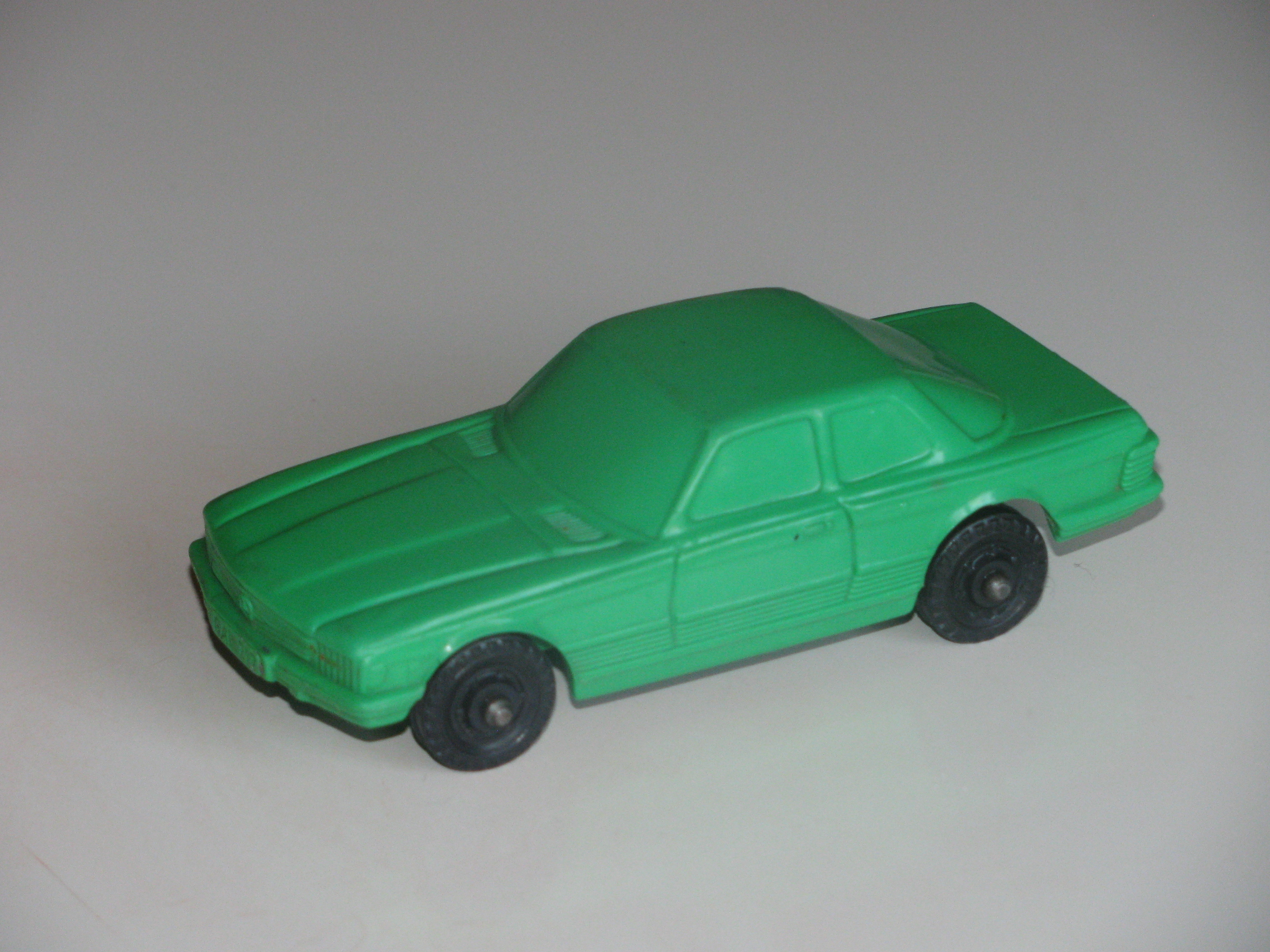
A Galanite diecast Mercedes Benz 350 SLC.

== Company details ==
Galanite was sold in 1971 to Branch & Co., and three years later the company moved to a new factory in Arlöv. Galanite went into liquidation in 1979. The company named changed a few years later to Bengtsfors Plastics Industry, which also went out of business. Later, MPV purchased the Galanite name. Some cars were thus made by MPV but marked Galanite. A unique collaboration existed between the Nordic toy manufacturers, which rented Galanite's molds. Galanite toys have also been made by HP-Plast in Denmark, by Giske in Norway and by Plasto in Finland.
