= Auburn, Indiana =

- City
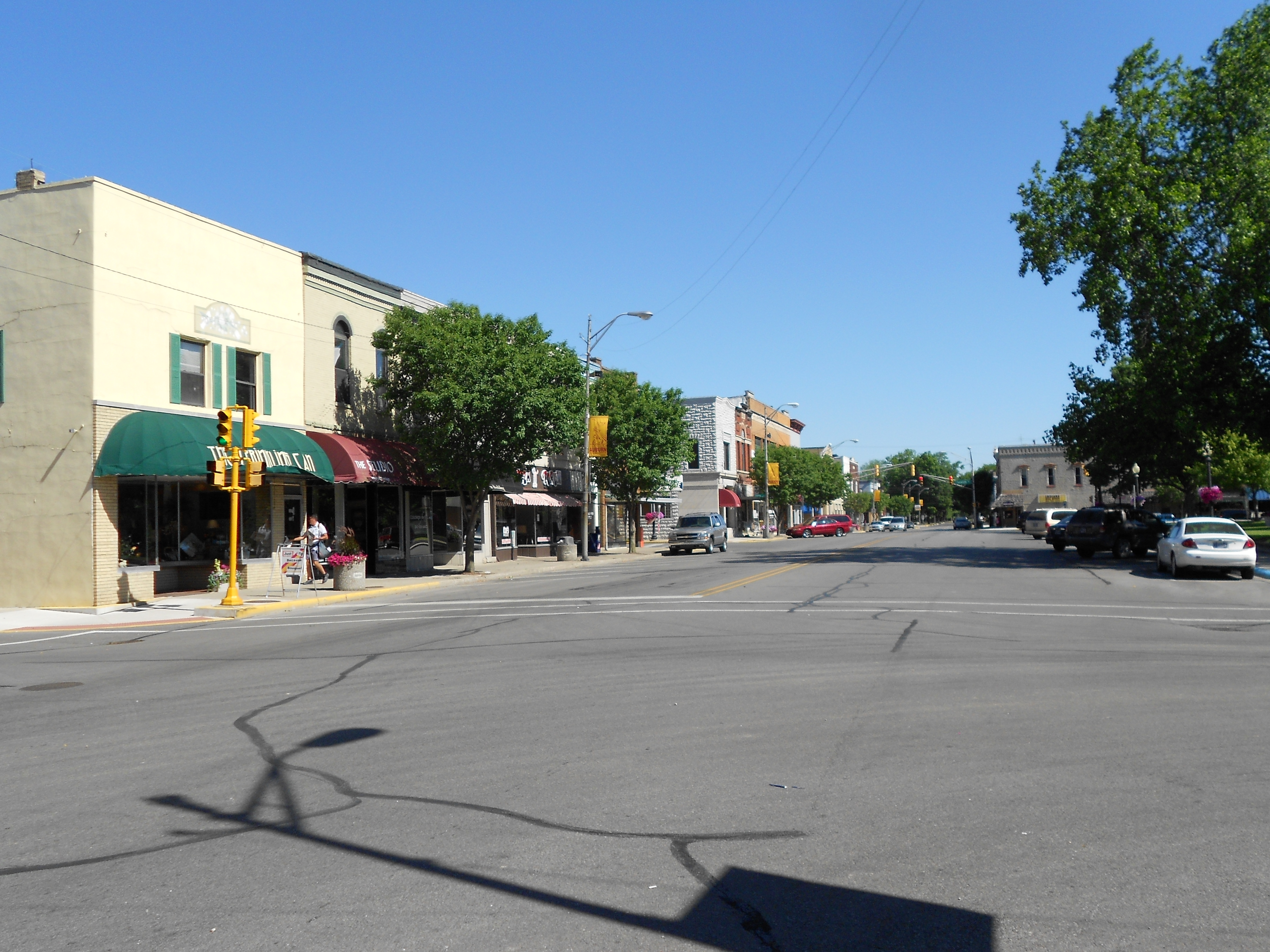
- Main Street in downtown Auburn, Indiana

- Flag Seal
- Nickname: Home of the Classics
- Location of Auburn in DeKalb County, Indiana.

- Location in Indiana Auburn (the United States) Auburn (North America)
- Coordinates: 41°22′36″N 85°02′56″W
- Country: United States
- State: Indiana
- County: DeKalb
- Township: Grant, Union, Keyser, Jackson
- Settled: 1836
- Founded: 1837
- Incorporated (town): 1849
- Incorporated (city): March 26, 1900

Government
  - Mayor: Dave Clark (R)

Area
  - Total: 8.08 sq mi (20.94 km^{2})
  - Land: 8.08 sq mi (20.94 km^{2})
  - Water: 0 sq mi (0.00 km^{2})
- Elevation: 863 ft (263 m)

Population (2020)
  - Total: 13,412
  - Density: 1,659.0/sq mi (640.54/km^{2})
- Time zone: UTC-5 (EST)
  - Summer (DST): UTC-4 (EDT)
- ZIP code: 46706
- Area code: 260
- FIPS code: 18-02674
- GNIS ID: 2394022
- Website: www.ci.auburn.in.us

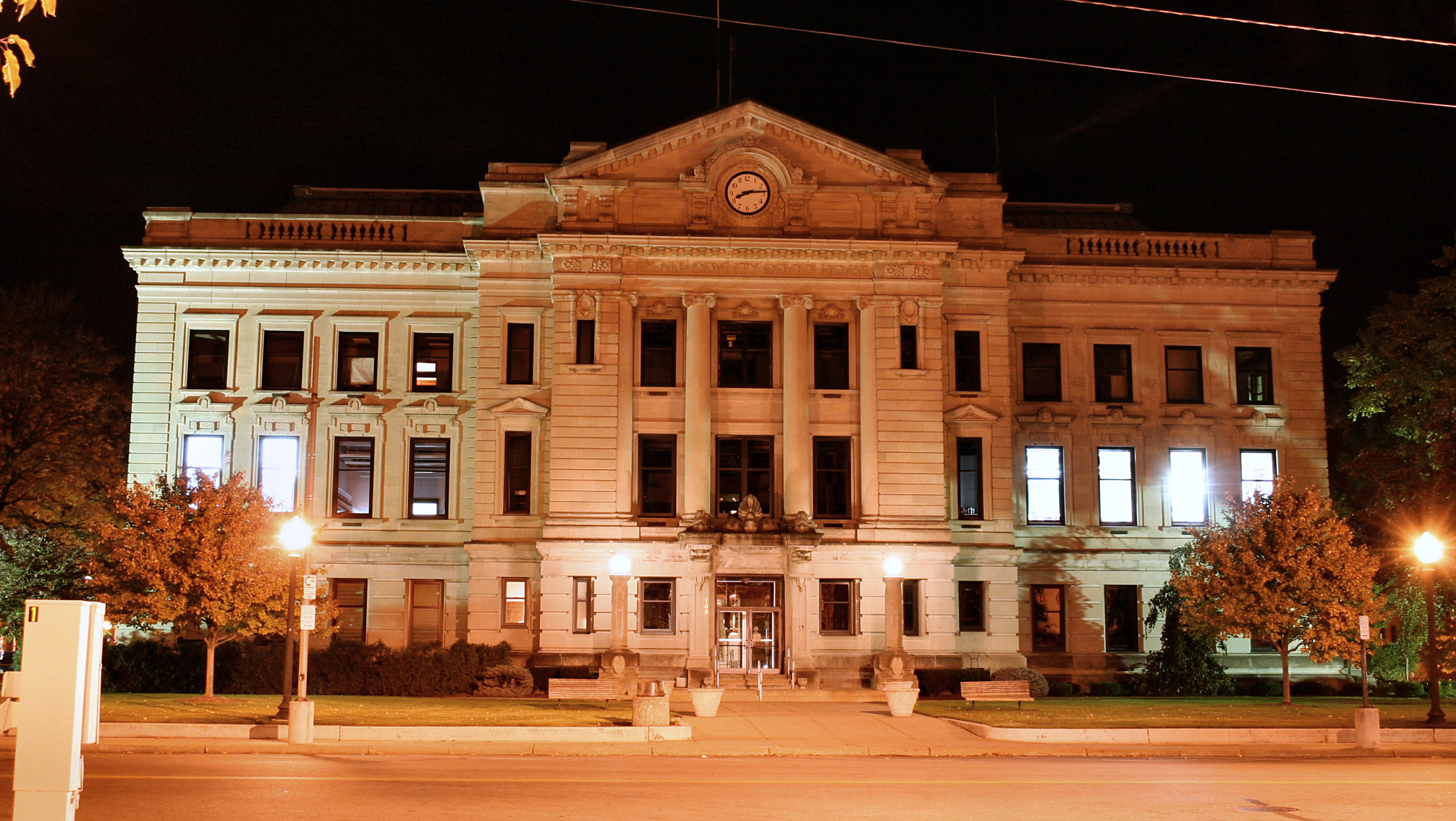
DeKalb County Court House, Auburn, Indiana.

Auburn is a city in DeKalb County, Indiana, United States. The population was 13,412 at the 2020 census. Founded in 1836 by Wesley Park (1811–1868), the city is the county seat of DeKalb County. Auburn is also known as Home of the Classics.

== History ==
Auburn's site on Cedar Creek was chosen by Wesley Park and John Badlam Howe at the intersection of two major trails, Goshen-Defiance Road and Coldwater Road, and next to the land of John Houlton. The name for the community likely came from "The Deserted Village" by Oliver Goldsmith, that begins "Sweet Auburn! Loveliest village of the plain." The plat of the Village of Auburn is dated April 21, 1836, but it was held by Howe and not recorded until March 12, 1879. John Drury purchased the first lot (Lot 73) for $25.00 on September 5, 1837. The first store was built at Park's corners by Thomas Freeman, applying for a license on March 5, 1838, and bringing supplies by horseback from Fort Wayne. Daniel Altenburg, Levi Walsworth, the Sherlock family, Samuel Sprott, David Weave, David Shoemaker, Henry Curtis, Lyman Childsey, James Cosper, and David Cosper were among the early residents.

A post office was established in 1839. In 1841, malaria ran through the town, and in 1843 a terrible storm wreaked havoc on cabins and crops. The Church of God was built by the Presbyterians in 1846. The Village of Auburn was incorporated in 1849, divided into wards, and governed under a town board and constable. By the end of the American Civil War, the town included over 700 inhabitants. The storm of September 29, 1872, destroyed Odd Fellow's Hall and damaged the Methodist Episcopal church. A few months later, on April 6, 1873, the new brick block of Seventh Street (Snyder's Building) collapsed, also destroying the Ensley Building. Auburn Water and Lights was constructed in 1898. The change in status to the City of Auburn on March 26, 1900, followed a referendum. Notable citizen Charles Eckhart erected a public library and a YMCA building.

The Auburn Automobile Company, which was founded in 1900, produced its first automobile in 1903. William Wrigley Jr. and Errett Lobban Cord controlled interests in the company, which eventually acquired Duesenberg, Lexington, and Lycoming Engines, and started Cord Car Company. The company failed in August 1937. Other makes of cars built in Auburn include Black, De Soto (not De Soto by Chrysler), IMP, Kiblinger, McIntyre and Zimmerman.

The Auburn Rubber Company was started in 1913 as the Double Fabric Tire Company, making tires for Auburn Automobile Company. In the 1920s, as Auburn Rubber, it became a large manufacturer of rubber toys, leaving Auburn in 1959. Auburn was home to early automobile company DeSoto in 1913. This company has no connection with the DeSoto that was manufactured by Chrysler.

Bank robber John Dillinger and some accomplices raided Auburn's police station on October 14, 1933, stealing a submachine gun, two steel vests, three rifles, six pistols and over 1000 rounds of ammunition.

The acts that led to the U.S. Supreme Court's decision in Stump v. Sparkman, 435 U.S. 349 (1978), the leading American case on judicial immunity, took place in Auburn in 1971. On June 28, 1988, four workers were asphyxiated at a local metal-plating plant in the worst confined-space industrial accident in U.S. history; a fifth victim died two days later.

The Auburn Community Mausoleum, Auburn Cord Duesenberg Automobile Museum, Downtown Auburn Historic District, and Eckhart Public Library and Park are listed on the National Register of Historic Places.

== Geography ==
Auburn is located 20 mi (32 km) north of Fort Wayne in Northern Indiana.

According to the 2010 census, the city has a total area of 7.10 square miles (18.4 km^{2}), all land.

Most of Auburn is located in Union civil township. Portions of Jackson and Keyser civil townships are also within the city limits.

=== Climate ===
Auburn has typical continental weather with very warm summers and very cold winters. Average January temperatures are a high of 31.4 °F (−0.3 °C) and a low of 17.2 °F (−8.2 °C). Average July temperatures are a high of 83.9 °F (28.8 °C) and a low of 62.0 °F (16.7 °C). There are an average of 13.1 days with highs of 90 °F (32 °C) or higher and an average of 136.8 days with lows of 32 °F (0 °C) or lower. The record high temperature was 106 °F (41 °C) on June 26, 1988. The record low temperature was −24 °F (−31 °C) on January 21, 1984.

Average annual precipitation in Auburn is 35.47 inches (901 mm). The wettest month is normally June, with an average of 4.17 inches (106 mm). The wettest year was 1985 with 43.50 inches (1,105 mm) and the driest year was 1964 with 19.93 inches (506 mm). The most precipitation in one month was 9.65 inches (245 mm) in June 1981. The most precipitation in 24 hours was 3.85 inches (98 mm) on August 20, 1904. There is an average of 32.4 inches (820 mm) of snow each year. The snowiest season was 1981–82 with 67.5 inches (1,710 mm), including 30.0 inches (760 mm) in January 1982. The most snowfall in 24 hours was 14.0 inches (360 mm) on January 26, 1978.

== Demographics ==
Historical population
Census	Pop.	Note	%±
1850	260		—
1860	639		145.8%
1870	677		5.9%
1880	1,542		127.8%
1890	2,415		56.6%
1900	3,396		40.6%
1910	3,919		15.4%
1920	4,650		18.7%
1930	5,088		9.4%
1940	5,415		6.4%
1950	5,879		8.6%
1960	6,350		8.0%
1970	7,388		16.3%
1980	8,122		9.9%
1990	9,379		15.5%
2000	12,074		28.7%
2010	12,731		5.4%
2020	13,412		5.3%
U.S. Decennial Census

=== 2020 census ===
As of the 2020 census, Auburn had a population of 13,412. The median age was 39.7 years. 22.7% of residents were under the age of 18 and 18.9% of residents were 65 years of age or older. For every 100 females there were 93.1 males, and for every 100 females age 18 and over there were 90.7 males age 18 and over.

99.5% of residents lived in urban areas, while 0.5% lived in rural areas.

There were 5,654 households in Auburn, of which 28.4% had children under the age of 18 living in them. Of all households, 43.3% were married-couple households, 18.4% were households with a male householder and no spouse or partner present, and 29.9% were households with a female householder and no spouse or partner present. About 32.9% of all households were made up of individuals and 15.1% had someone living alone who was 65 years of age or older.

There were 6,037 housing units, of which 6.3% were vacant. The homeowner vacancy rate was 1.8% and the rental vacancy rate was 8.7%.

Racial composition as of the 2020 census
Race	Number	Percent
White	12,492	93.1%
Black or African American	85	0.6%
American Indian and Alaska Native	29	0.2%
Asian	132	1.0%
Native Hawaiian and Other Pacific Islander	8	0.1%
Some other race	154	1.1%
Two or more races	512	3.8%
Hispanic or Latino (of any race)	467	3.5%

=== 2010 census ===
As of the 2010 census, there were 12,731 people, 5,226 households, and 3,322 families living in the city. The population density was 1,793.1 inhabitants per square mile (692.3/km^{2}). There were 5,692 housing units at an average density of 801.7 per square mile (309.5/km^{2}). The racial makeup of the city was 96.9% White, 0.4% African American, 0.2% Native American, 0.7% Asian, 0.7% from other races, and 1.0% from two or more races. Hispanic or Latino of any race were 2.6% of the population.

There were 5,226 households, of which 32.5% had children under the age of 18 living with them, 46.0% were married couples living together, 12.3% had a female householder with no husband present, 5.2% had a male householder with no wife present, and 36.4% were non-families. 31.2% of all households were made up of individuals, and 13.9% had someone living alone who was 65 years of age or older. The average household size was 2.38 and the average family size was 2.96.

The median age in the city was 37.9 years. 25.3% of residents were under the age of 18; 8.1% were between the ages of 18 and 24; 25.9% were from 25 to 44; 25.1% were from 45 to 64; and 15.6% were 65 years of age or older. The gender makeup of the city was 48.1% male and 51.9% female.

=== 2000 census ===
As of the 2000 census, there were 12,074 people, 4,927 households, and 3,202 families living in the city. The population density was 1,816.2 inhabitants per square mile (701.2/km^{2}). There were 5,258 housing units at an average density of 790.9 per square mile (305.4/km^{2}). The racial makeup of the city was 97.71% White, 0.35% African American, 0.10% Native American, 0.41% Asian, 0.02% Pacific Islander, 0.61% from other races, and 0.80% from two or more races. Hispanic or Latino of any race were 1.75% of the population.

There were 4,927 households, out of which 33.4% had children under the age of 18 living with them, 51.2% were married couples living together, 10.1% had a female householder with no husband present, and 35.0% were non-families. 30.1% of all households were made up of individuals, and 12.2% had someone living alone who was 65 years of age or older. The average household size was 2.41 and the average family size was 2.99.

In the city the population was spread out, with 26.4% under the age of 18, 9.2% from 18 to 24, 30.7% from 25 to 44, 19.9% from 45 to 64, and 13.7% who were 65 years of age or older. The median age was 34 years. For every 100 females, there were 92.5 males. For every 100 females age 18 and over, there were 89.0 males.

The median income for a household in the city was $42,762, and the median income for a family was $52,687. Males had a median income of $38,007 versus $24,414 for females. The per capita income for the city was $20,945. About 2.9% of families and 5.2% of the population were below the poverty line, including 3.4% of those under age 18 and 7.5% of those age 65 or over.

== Arts and culture ==
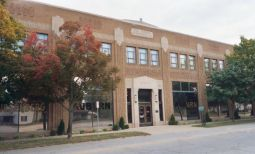
Auburn Cord Duesenberg Automobile Museum, Auburn, Indiana, a National Historic Landmark that was once the headquarters and showroom of the Auburn Automobile Company.

Auburn is the location of the Auburn Cord Duesenberg Festival, held each Labor Day weekend. The city also has several museums, including the Early Ford V-8 Museum, the Auburn Cord Duesenberg Automobile Museum and the National Auto and Truck Museum. The latter two are National Historic Landmarks. The Auburn Cord Duesenberg Festival, with the annual Labor Day auction, is said to host one of the world's largest automotive auctions. These automotive-related events are the legacy of the Auburn Automobile Company, which closed in the late 1930s. The company had its headquarters and a factory in Auburn. The DeKalb County Free Fall Fair, held in downtown Auburn, is a six-day event usually held in the last week of September and has over 850,000 guests per year.

The official city logo, pictured at right, is based on the logo of the former Auburn Automobile Company. The company went out of business in the 1930s. The municipality began using the logo in the 1980s. The city's official nickname is 'Home of the Classics,' a reference to the classic automobiles once manufactured there.

== Government ==
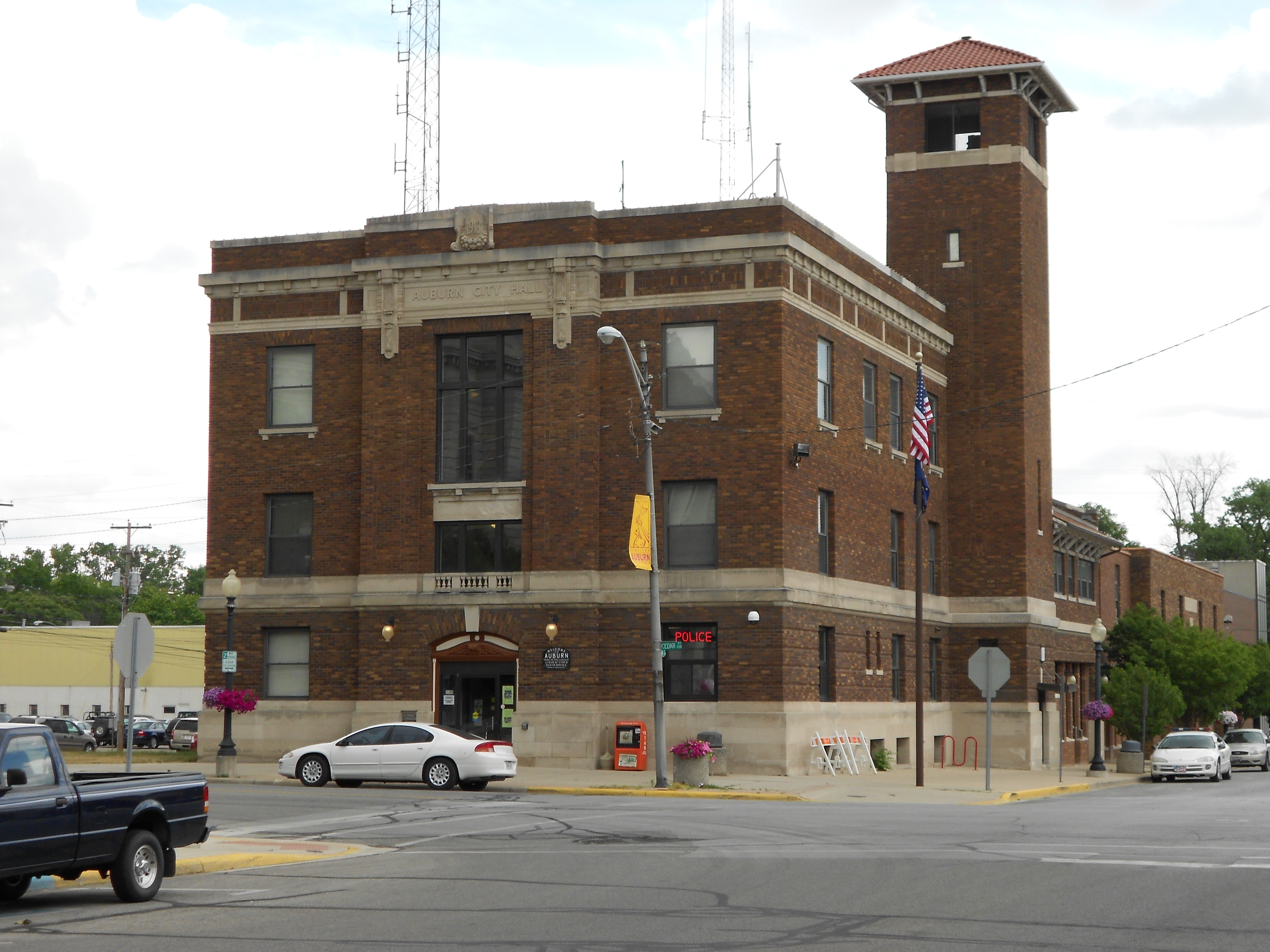
Auburn's Italianate City Hall, completed in 1913. Connected to the Dekalb County Jail.

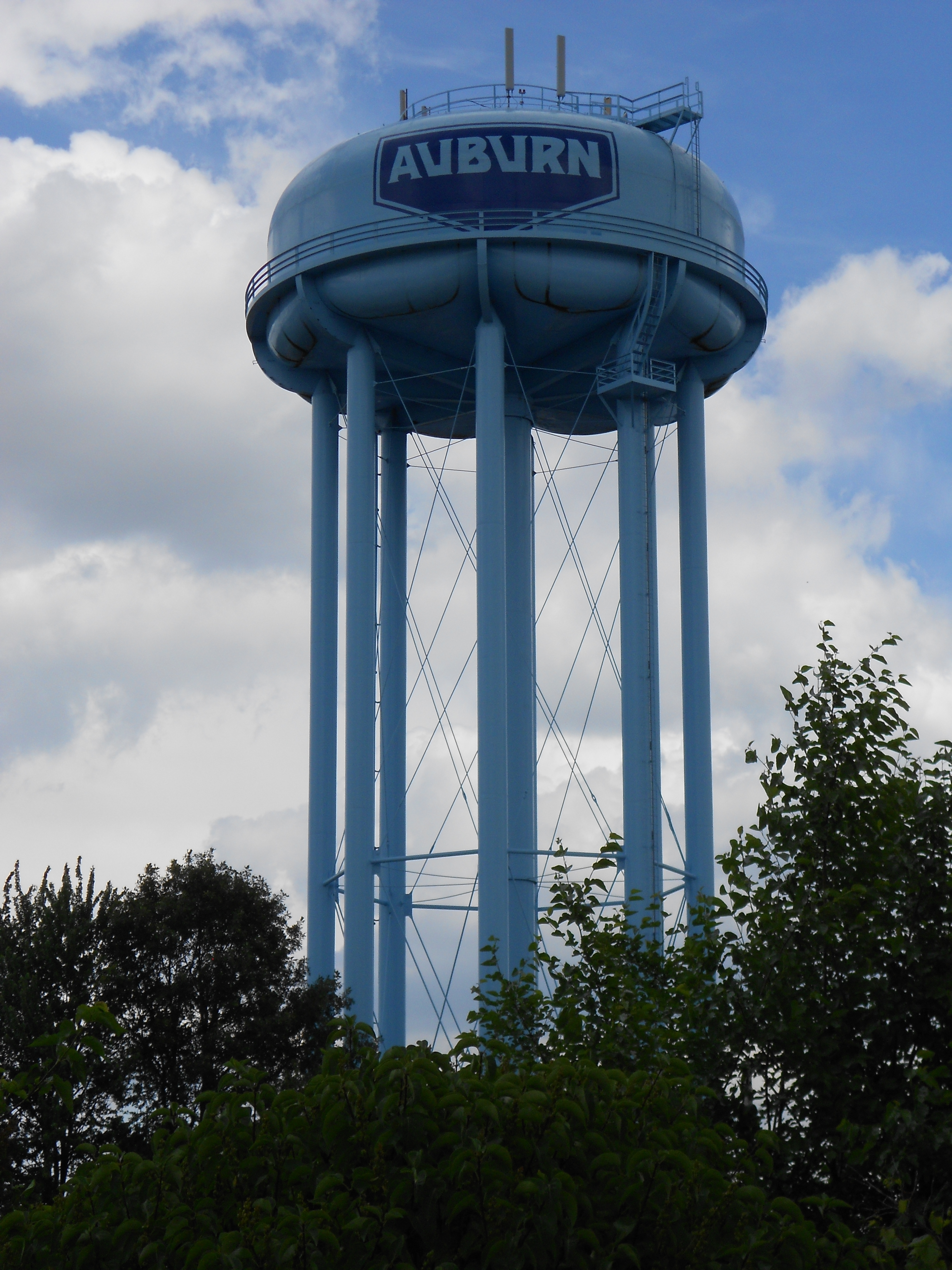
Fulton Street water tower, erected 1946.

Auburn is governed by an elected mayor and seven-member common council and a three-member board of public works and safety consisting of the mayor and two others appointed by the mayor. Five members of the common council are elected from individual districts and two are elected at-large.

== Education ==
Most of Auburn lies in the DeKalb County Central United School District. Public schools serving Auburn are:

- James R. Watson Elementary School
- McKenney-Harrison Elementary School
- DeKalb Middle School (Waterloo)
- DeKalb High School (Waterloo)

There is also a K-12 private school:

- Lakewood Park Christian School

The town has a free lending library, the Eckhart Public Library.

== Media ==
=== Radio stations ===
- 106.7 WFGA - Classic Country
- 1570 AM WGLL — religious
- 102.3 FM WGBJ — "Alt 102.3" Licensed to Auburn, studios in Fort Wayne, Indiana

=== Newspaper ===
- The Star, (formerly known as The Evening Star)

== Notable people ==
- Rece Buckmaster (born 1996), soccer player
- Gordon Buehrig (1904–1990), automobile designer, lived in Auburn for two years while designing 1935–1936 Auburn Speedster and is buried in Roselawn Cemetery.
- Errett Lobban Cord (1894–1974), industrialist, lived in Auburn while running Auburn Automobile Company.
- Will Cuppy (1884–1949), humorist and journalist, was born in Auburn, graduated from Auburn High School and is buried in Evergreen Cemetery.
- James I. Farley (1871–1948), member of US House of Representatives, 1933–1939, lived in Auburn while executive of Auburn Automobile Company and is buried in Woodlawn Cemetery.
- Walter Hartman Hodge (1896–1975) was a lawyer and judge.
- MaChelle Joseph, former women's basketball head coach at Georgia Tech, player for Purdue, 1992 Big Ten Player of the Year; born in Auburn.
- Don Lash (1912–1994), track-and-field champion, won 1938 James E. Sullivan Award as top amateur athlete in U.S., graduated from Auburn High School in 1933.
- Charles A. O. McClellan (1835–1898), member of US House of Representatives, 1889–1892, lived in Auburn and practiced law there.
- Rollie Zeider (1883–1967), early 20th Century Major League Baseball player, was born in Cass County and raised in Auburn.

== Port Authority ==
Auburn controls, maintains, and owns the City of Auburn Port Authority. It consists of one mile of track servicing two industries on the former Fort Wayne and Jackson Railroad. The Port Authority owns no locomotives or rolling stock, and the only employees are the five-member volunteer board of directors. CSX delivers about twenty five cars of plastic resin a year.
