= GPC =

GPC may refer to:

== Businesses and organisations ==
=== Politics ===
- General People's Congress (disambiguation)
- Goa People's Congress, in India
- Green Party of Canada
- Group of Cameroonian Progressives

=== Other businesses and organisations ===
- Genuine Parts Company, an American car servicer
- Goldwyn Pictures, an American film studio
- Global Plant Clinic, an agricultural organization
- GPC Biotech, a German biopharmaceutical company

== Places ==
- Gene Polisseni Center, an ice hockey arena at Rochester Institute of Technology, New York, US
- George Pearson Centre, a long-term care facility in Vancouver, Canada
- Putnam County Airport, in Indiana, US

== Science and technology ==
- Gel permeation chromatography
- Generalized polynomial chaos
- General Polygon Clipper, a graphics library
- Giant papillary conjunctivitis, a disease of the eye
- Gigaparsec (Gpc), a unit of distance
- Global Privacy Control, a data protection signal for the web
- Glycophorin C, a sialoglycoprotein
- Glycerophosphorylcholine, or alpha-GPC
- Glypican, a proteoglycan
- GNU Pascal, a computer program

== Other uses ==
- Geiriadur Prifysgol Cymru, the University of Wales Dictionary of the Welsh language
- Georgia Perimeter College in Georgia, United States
- Global Product Classification
- Global Pound Conference, a conference series on international dispute resolution
- Government Procurement Card, a United Kingdom government purchasing card
- Government Purchase Card, a United States government purchasing program
- GPC Sport, an auto racing team
- Remington GPC, an American assault rifle
- GPC (Mystery Science Theater 3000), a robot character from Mystery Science Theater 3000
