= List of airports in Indiana =

This is a list of airports in Indiana (a U.S. state), grouped by type and sorted by location. It contains all public-use and military airports in the state. Some private-use and former airports may be included where notable, such as airports that were previously public-use, those with commercial enplanements recorded by the FAA, or airports assigned an IATA airport code.

== Airports ==
This list contains the following information:

- **City served** – The city generally associated with the airport, as per the airport's master record with the Federal Aviation Administration. This is not always the actual location since some airports are located in smaller towns outside of the city they serve. It is not meant to be a complete list of cities served, which can be found in or added to each airport's Wikipedia article.
- **FAA** – The location identifier assigned by the Federal Aviation Administration (FAA). These are linked to each airport's page at the Indiana Department of Transportation with aerial photographs.
- **IATA** – The airport code assigned by the International Air Transport Association (IATA). Those that do not match the FAA code are shown in bold.
- **ICAO** – The location indicator assigned by the International Civil Aviation Organization (ICAO).
- **Airport name** – The official airport name. Those shown in **bold** indicate the airport has scheduled passenger service on commercial airlines.
- **Role** – One of four FAA airport categories, as per the 2021–2025 National Plan of Integrated Airport Systems (NPIAS) report released September 2020:
  - P-s: Commercial service – primary are publicly owned airports that receive scheduled passenger service and have more than 10,000 passenger boardings (enplanements) each year. Each primary airport is sub-classified by the FAA as one of the following four "hub" types (s):
    - L: Large hub that accounts for at least 1% of total U.S. passenger enplanements.
    - M: Medium hub that accounts for between 0.25% and 1% of total U.S. passenger enplanements.
    - S: Small hub that accounts for between 0.05% and 0.25% of total U.S. passenger enplanements.
    - N: Nonhub that accounts for less than 0.05% of total U.S. passenger enplanements, but more than 10,000 annual enplanements.
  - CS: Commercial service – nonprimary are publicly owned airports that receive scheduled passenger service and have at least 2,500 passenger boardings each year.
  - R: Reliever airports are designated by the FAA to relieve congestion at a large commercial service airport and to provide more general aviation access to the overall community.
  - GA: General aviation airports are the largest single group of airports in the U.S. airport system. They are public-use airports that do not have scheduled service or have scheduled service with less than 2,500 passenger boardings each year.
- **Enplanements** – The number of enplanements (commercial passenger boardings) that occurred at the airport in calendar year 2024, as per FAA records released 2025.

| City served | FAA | IATA | ICAO | Airport name | Role | Enplanements (2024) |
|---|---|---|---|---|---|---|
| | | | | **Commercial service – primary airports** | | |
| Evansville | EVV | EVV | KEVV | **Evansville Regional Airport** | P-N | 189,706 |
| Fort Wayne | FWA | FWA | KFWA | **Fort Wayne International Airport** | P-N | 424,491 |
| Indianapolis | IND | IND | KIND | **Indianapolis International Airport** | P-M | 5,181,947 |
| South Bend | SBN | SBN | KSBN | **South Bend International Airport** | P-N | 454,920 |
| | | | | **Commercial service – nonprimary airports** | | |
| West Lafayette | LAF | LAF | KLAF | **Purdue University Airport** | CS | 5,647 |
| | | | | **Reliever airports** | | |
| Griffith | 05C | | | Griffith-Merrillville Airport | R | 20 |
| Indianapolis | EYE | | KEYE | Eagle Creek Airpark | R | 6 |
| Indianapolis | 2R2 | | | Hendricks County Airport (Gordon Graham Field) | R | 0 |
| Indianapolis | UMP | | KUMP | Indianapolis Metropolitan Airport | R | 47 |
| Indianapolis / McCordsville | MQJ | | KMQJ | Indianapolis Regional Airport (was Mount Comfort Airport) | R | 44 |
| Indianapolis / Zionsville | TYQ | | KTYQ | Indianapolis Executive Airport | R | 443 |
| Jeffersonville | JVY | | KJVY | Clark Regional Airport | R | 75 |
| | | | | **General aviation airports** | | |
| Anderson | AID | AID | KAID | Anderson Municipal Airport (Darlington Field) | GA | 6 |
| Angola | ANQ | ANQ | KANQ | Tri-State Steuben County Airport | GA | 0 |
| Auburn | GWB | | KGWB | DeKalb County Airport | GA | 0 |
| Batesville | HLB | HLB | KHLB | Batesville Airport (was Hillebrand Indistries Airport, closed Dec 1, 2017, has reopened) | GA | 4 |
| Bedford | BFR | BFR | KBFR | Virgil I. Grissom Municipal Airport | GA | 0 |
| Bloomington | BMG | BMG | KBMG | Monroe County Airport | GA | 2,855 |
| Columbus | BAK | **CLU** | KBAK | Columbus Municipal Airport | GA | 5 |
| Connersville | CEV | CEV | KCEV | Mettel Field | GA | 0 |
| Crawfordsville | CFJ | | KCFJ | Crawfordsville Regional Airport | GA | 0 |
| Delphi | 1I9 | | | Delphi Municipal Airport | GA | 0 |
| Elkhart | EKM | **EKI** | KEKM | Elkhart Municipal Airport | GA | 42 |
| Fort Wayne | SMD | SMD | KSMD | Smith Field | GA | 0 |
| Frankfort | FKR | | KFKR | Frankfort Municipal Airport | GA | 0 |
| French Lick | FRH | FRH | KFRH | French Lick Municipal Airport | GA | 0 |
| Gary | GYY | GYY | KGYY | Gary/Chicago International Airport | GA | 5,435 |
| Goshen | GSH | GSH | KGSH | Goshen Municipal Airport | GA | 0 |
| Greencastle | GPC | | KGPC | Putnam County Regional Airport | GA | 0 |
| Greensburg | I34 | | | Greensburg Municipal Airport (was Greensburg-Decatur County) | GA | 0 |
| Huntingburg | HNB | HNB | KHNB | Huntingburg Airport | GA | 0 |
| Huntington | HHG | | KHHG | Huntington Municipal Airport | GA | 0 |
| Indianapolis | 8A4 | | | Indianapolis Downtown Heliport | GA | 0 |
| Indianapolis / Greenwood | HFY | | KHFY | Indy South Greenwood Airport | GA | 6 |
| Kendallville | C62 | | | Kendallville Municipal Airport | GA | 0 |
| Kentland | 50I | **KKT** | | Kentland Municipal Airport | GA | 0 |
| Knox | OXI | | KOXI | Starke County Airport | GA | 0 |
| Kokomo | OKK | OKK | KOKK | Kokomo Municipal Airport | GA | 0 |
| La Porte | PPO | **LPO** | KPPO | La Porte Municipal Airport | GA | 0 |
| Logansport | GGP | | KGGP | Logansport/Cass County Airport | GA | 0 |
| Madison | IMS | **MDN** | KIMS | Madison Municipal Airport | GA | 1 |
| Marion | MZZ | MZZ | KMZZ | Marion Municipal Airport (McKinney Field) | GA | 0 |
| Michigan City | MGC | MGC | KMGC | Michigan City Municipal Airport (Phillips Field) | GA | 0 |
| Monticello | MCX | | KMCX | White County Airport | GA | 4 |
| Muncie | MIE | MIE | KMIE | Delaware County Regional Airport (was Delaware County Airport) | GA | 297 |
| New Castle | UWL | | KUWL | New Castle Henry County Airport (Marlatt Field) | GA | 0 |
| North Vernon | OVO | | KOVO | North Vernon Airport | GA | 0 |
| Paoli | I42 | | | Paoli Municipal Airport | GA | 0 |
| Peru | I76 | | | Peru Municipal Airport | GA | 0 |
| Plymouth | C65 | **PLY** | | Plymouth Municipal Airport | GA | 6 |
| Portland | PLD | | KPLD | Portland Municipal Airport | GA | 0 |
| Rensselaer | RZL | **RNZ** | KRZL | Jasper County Airport | GA | 0 |
| Richmond | RID | RID | KRID | Richmond Municipal Airport | GA | 0 |
| Rochester | RCR | RCR | KRCR | Fulton County Airport | GA | 0 |
| Salem | I83 | | | Salem Municipal Airport | GA | 0 |
| Seymour | SER | SER | KSER | Freeman Municipal Airport | GA | 0 |
| Shelbyville | GEZ | | KGEZ | Shelbyville Municipal Airport | GA | 4 |
| Sullivan | SIV | SIV | KSIV | Sullivan County Airport | GA | 0 |
| Tell City | TEL | | KTEL | Perry County Municipal Airport | GA | 0 |
| Terre Haute | HUF | HUF | KHUF | Terre Haute Regional Airport (Hulman Field) | GA | 382 |
| Valparaiso | VPZ | VPZ | KVPZ | Porter County Regional Airport | GA | 0 |
| Wabash | IWH | | KIWH | Wabash Municipal Airport | GA | 0 |
| Warsaw | ASW | | KASW | Warsaw Municipal Airport | GA | 4 |
| Washington | DCY | | KDCY | Daviess County Airport | GA | 0 |
| Winamac | RWN | | KRWN | Arens Field | GA | 0 |
| Winchester | I22 | | | Randolph County Airport | GA | 0 |
| | | | | **Other public-use airports** (not listed in NPIAS) | | |
| Alexandria | I99 | | | Alexandria Airport | | |
| Angola | I58 | | | Crooked Lake Seaplane Base | | |
| Angola | 01E | | | Lake James Seaplane Base | | |
| Angola | C67 | | | Lake Pleasant Seaplane Base | | |
| Bloomfield | 1I3 | | | Shawnee Field | | |
| Bloomington | 07I | | | Lake Monroe Seaplane Base | | |
| Bluffton | C40 | | | Miller Airport | | |
| Boonville | I91 | | | Boonville Airport | | |
| Brazil | 0I2 | | | Brazil Clay County Airport | | |
| Brookville | 12I | | | Brookville Reservoir Seaplane Base | | |
| Cedar Lake | IN7 | | | Cedar Lake Seaplane Base | | |
| Clarksville | 1I6 | | | Holiday Inn Lakeview Heliport | | |
| Clear Lake | 57P | | | Clear Lake Seaplane Base | | |
| Converse | 1I8 | | | Converse Airport | | |
| Culver | 01H | | | Lake Maxinkuckee Seaplane Base | | |
| Elkhart | 3C1 | | | Mishawaka Pilots Club Airport | | |
| Eminence | 78I | | | Pam's Place Airport | | |
| Evansville | 3EV | | | Skylane Airport | | |
| Flora | 5I2 | | | Flora Municipal Airport | | |
| Franklin | 3FK | | | Franklin Flying Field | | |
| French Lick | 06I | | | Patoka Reservoir Landing Area (Seaplane Base) | | |
| Galveston | 5I6 | | | Galveston Airport | | |
| Greenfield | GFD | GFD | KGFD | Pope Field | | |
| Hagerstown | I61 | | | Hagerstown Airport | | |
| Hamilton | 01F | | | Hamilton Lake Seaplane Base | | |
| Hanover | 64I | | | Lee Bottom Airport | | |
| Hobart | 3HO | | | Hobart Sky Ranch Airport | | |
| Hudson Lake | IN6 | | | Hudson Lake Seaplane Base | | |
| Indianapolis | 7L8 | | | Post-Air Airport | | |
| Jamestown | IN2 | | | Snow Lake Seaplane Base | | |
| Kokomo | 8I3 | | | Glenndale Airport | | |
| Lake James | 7J4 | | | Jimmerson Lake Seaplane Base | | |
| Lake Village | C98 | | | Lake Village Airport | | |
| Lebanon | 6I4 | | | Boone County Airport | | |
| Leo-Cedarville | IN4 | | | Cedarville Reservoir Seaplane Base | | |
| Lowell | C97 | | | Lowell Airport | | |
| Mentone | C92 | | | Mentone Airport | | |
| Monticello | I00 | | | Lake Shafer Seaplane Base | | |
| Mount Vernon | IN3 | | | Posey Patch Ultralight | | |
| Muncie | 7I2 | | | Reese Airport | | |
| Nappanee | C03 | | | Nappanee Municipal Airport | | |
| Noblesville | I80 | | | Noblesville Airport | | |
| North Webster | IN9 | | | Webster Lake Seaplane Base | | |
| Oaktown | I20 | **OTN** | | Ed-Air Airport | | |
| Orleans | 7I4 | | | Orleans Airport | | |
| Peru | 43I | | | Mississinewa Reservoir Landing Area (Seaplane Base) | | |
| Scottsburg | 3R8 | | | Scottsburg Airport | | |
| Sheridan | 5I4 | | | Sheridan Airport | | |
| Stroh | IN0 | | | Big Turkey Lake Seaplane Base | | |
| Syracuse | 99D | | | Dewart Lake Seaplane Base | | |
| Syracuse | 01D | | | Lake Wawasee Seaplane Base | | |
| Terre Haute | 3I3 | | | Sky King Airport | | |
| Vevay | 8I1 | | | Robinson Airport | | |
| Warsaw | 01B | | | Tippecanoe Seaplane Base | | |
| Waterloo | 4C2 | | | Walker/Rowe Waterloo Airport | | |
| Westfield | I72 | | | Westfield Airport | | |
| Winona | 01L | | | Bass Lake Seaplane Base | | |
| Winona Lake | 02D | | | Winona Lake Seaplane Base | | |
| Woolcottville | IN5 | | | Adams Lake Seaplane Base | | |
| | | | | **Other military airports** | | |
| Peru | GUS | GUS | KGUS | Grissom Joint Air Reserve Base / Grissom Aeroplex | | |
| | | | | **Notable private-use airports** | | |
| Burnettsville | 77II | | | Boyer Flight Park (was public-use, FAA: 7W7) | | |
| Hobart | 9IN3 | | | Johnsons Strawberry Farm Airport | | |
| Knox | IG05 | | | Wheeler Airport (was public-use, FAA: 3C5) | | |
| La Crosse | II10 | | | Lou Abbett Farms Airport | | |
| Linton | 0IN6 | | | Morrison Flight Park (was public-use, FAA: 4U8) | | |
| Poseyville | IN95 | | | Ralph E. Koch Airport (was public-use, FAA: 61Y) | | |
| Union Mills | IN41 | | | Flying U Ranch Airport | | |
| | | | | **Notable former airports** | | |
| McCordsville | ~~I21~~ | | | McCordsville Airpark / Brookside Airpark (closed 2003) | | |
| Butler | ~~B25~~ | | | Harrold Airport (closed 2011?) | | |
| Clinton | ~~1I7~~ | | | Clinton Airport (closed 2017) | | |
| Decatur | ~~DCR~~ | ~~DCR~~ | ~~KDCR~~ | Decatur Hi-Way Airport (closed 2005) | | |
| Elwood | ~~3I1~~ | | | Elwood Airport (closed 2009?) | | |
| Hardinsburg | ~~I38~~ | | | Action Airpark (closed 2009-2010?) | | |
| Lafayette | ~~3AR~~ | | | Aretz Airport (closed 1999-2002?) | | |
| Speedway | ~~3SY~~ | | | Speedway Airport (closed 1999-2002?) | | |
| Vincennes | ~~OEA~~ | ~~OEA~~ | ~~KOEA~~ | O'Neal Airport (closed 2009?) | | |

== See also ==
- Indiana World War II Army Airfields
- Wikipedia:WikiProject Aviation/Airline destination lists: North America#Indiana
