= DCY =

DCY or DC-Y may refer to:

- Daocheng Yading Airport (IATA code), Garzê Tibetan Autonomous Prefecture of Sichuan province, China
- Daviess County Airport (FAA LID code), Indiana, US
- McDonnell Douglas DC-Y, a planned follow on to the DC-X carrier rocket
