= FRHS =

FRHS may refer to:

- Far Rockaway High School, in New York City, now closed
- Fellow of the Royal Historical Society
- Fellow of the Royal Horticultural Society
- Fossil Ridge High School (Fort Collins, Colorado), United States
- Fossil Ridge High School (Fort Worth, Texas), United States
- Fremont Ross High School (Fremont, Ohio), United States

== See also ==
- FRH (disambiguation)
