= Anderson Municipal Airport =

Anderson Regional Airport
- IATA: AID; ICAO: KAID; FAA LID: AID

Summary
- Airport type: Public
- Owner: City of Anderson
- Serves: Anderson, Indiana
- Elevation AMSL: 919 ft (280 m)
- Coordinates: 40°06′31″N 085°36′47″W
- Website: CityOfAnderson.com/...

Map
- Location of airport in Indiana/United States AID (the United States)

Runways
| Direction | Length | | Surface |
| Direction | ft | m | Surface |
|---|---|---|---|
| 12/30 | 5,400 | 1,646 | Asphalt |
| 18/36 | 3,400 | 1,036 | Asphalt |

Statistics (2025)
- Aircraft operations: 25,000
- Based aircraft: 122
- Sources: FAA and City of Anderson

Anderson Regional Airport (IATA: AID, ICAO: KAID, FAA LID: AID) (Darlington Field) is a public use airport three miles east of Anderson in Madison County, Indiana. The National Plan of Integrated Airport Systems for 2011–2015 categorized it as a general aviation facility. The airport currently has no scheduled air service however, is one of the busiest general aviation airports in the State of Indiana given its high volume of flight training and charter traffic.

== Previous air service ==
Prior to the closing of the General Motors factories in Anderson, the airport did have relatively small service to Detroit (Metro), Detroit (City), Kokomo, Buffalo, Indianapolis, and Dayton. This service, however, was very limited and intended for General Motors employees to go from factory to factory. These flights were served by snacks and even a Continental Breakfast.

== Facilities ==
The airport covers 619 acres (251 ha) at an elevation of 919 feet (280 m). It has two asphalt runways: 12/30 is 5,400 by 100 feet (1,646 x 30 m), and runway 18/36 is 3,399 by 75 feet (1,036 x 23 m).

The airport operates its own fixed-base operator. Besides fuel, parking and ground handling, catering, deicing, GPUs, and tugs are available line services. Conference rooms, refreshments, snooze rooms, work stations, and courtesy cars are also provided. Aircraft rental, sales, and maintenance as well as pilot training are also available at the airport. The airport was reclassified as a regional airport in late 2024 because of its increase of based aircraft (around 110) and drastic increase in flight operations. The airport was renamed Anderson Regional Airport at that time.

== Aircraft ==
For the 12-month period ending December 31, 2018, the airport averaged 53 aircraft operations per day, or about 19,000 per year: 93% general aviation, 6% air taxi, and 1% military. For the same time period, 92 aircraft were based at the airport: 79 single-engine and 10 multi-engine airplanes, 2 helicopters, and 1 jet.

== Accidents & Incidents ==
- On August 15, 2004, a single-engine airplane crashed after takeoff from Anderson Airport. The aircraft was being flown on a test flight after maintenance had been done when it lost engine power and crashed off the side of a nearby state highway. The pilot was taken to the hospital with serious injuries but was stabilized.
- On November 21, 2004, a Cessna 172 crashed while attempting to land at Anderson. The plane was flown by a student pilot on a solo flight. The pilot reported they were correcting for an approach above glideslope; as they tried to increase rate of descent, they stalled the plane above the runway and bounced multiple times before porpoising and striking the plane's propeller on the runway. The pilot was able to bring the plane to a landing and taxi into the FBO. The probably cause of the accident was found to be the student pilot's improper flare and inadequate recovery from a bounced landing. The pilot was not injured.
- On May 5, 2019, a Piper PA-34 Seneca crashed at Anderson Airport. The sole pilot onboard was airlifted to the hospital with serious injuries.

== Recognitions ==
In 2024, Anderson Municipal Airport (now Anderson Regional Airport) received two significant accolades: Airport of the Year by Aviation Indiana and regional status from the FAA. These advancements reflect the airport's economic impact, aviation education, community engagement, and safety improvements. The regional designation also makes the airport eligible for more federal and state grants, contributing to its economic development efforts.

== See also ==
- List of airports in Indiana
