= C62 =

C62 or C-62 may refer to:

- Caldwell 62, a spiral galaxy
- HMS Gloucester (C62), a Town-class light cruiser of the Royal Navy
- JNR Class C62, a class of Japanese steam locomotives
- Kendallville Municipal Airport, in Noble County, Indiana
- Ruy Lopez, a chess opening
- Safety Provisions (Building) Convention, 1937 of the International Labour Organization
- Testicular cancer
- Waco C-62, a proposed American high-wing transport airplane
- Koenig C62
