= La Porte Municipal Airport =

La Porte Municipal Airport may refer to:

- La Porte Municipal Airport (Indiana), in La Porte, Indiana, United States (FAA: PPO)
- La Porte Municipal Airport (Texas), in La Porte, Texas, United States (FAA: T41)
