= I72 =

I72 can refer to:

- Interstate 72
- HMS Unicorn (I72)
- Westfield Airport
