= Miller Airport =

Miller Airport may refer to:

- Miller Airport (Indiana) in Bluffton, Indiana, United States (FAA: C40)
- Miller Airport, Reed City, Michigan (defunct)
- Miller Airport (Ohio) in Alliance, Ohio, United States (FAA: 4G3)
- Miller Field (airport), an airport in Valentine, Nebraska, United States (FAA: VTN)
- Miller Memorial Airpark in Vale, Oregon, United States (FAA: S49)
- Miller Municipal Airport in Miller, South Dakota, United States (FAA: MKA)
