= C98 =

C98 or C-98 may refer to:

- C-98 Clipper, the military designation of the Boeing 314 flying boat
- CJYC-FM, "Big John FM", formerly known as "C98"
- Cray C98, a model of the Cray C90
- Ruy Lopez (ECO code), a chess opening
- Lake Village Airport (FAA LID), Indiana, US
- Right to Organise and Collective Bargaining Convention, 1949 (ILO code)
