= Fulton County Airport =

Fulton County Airport may refer to:

- Fulton County Airport (Georgia) in Fulton County, Georgia, United States (FAA: FTY)
- Fulton County Airport (Indiana) in Fulton County, Indiana, United States (FAA: RCR)
- Fulton County Airport (New York) in Fulton County, New York, United States (FAA: NY0)
- Fulton County Airport (Ohio) in Fulton County, Ohio, United States (FAA: USE)
