= KHHG =

KHHG may refer to:

- Huntington Municipal Airport (Indiana) (ICAO code KHHG)
- KZBH, a radio station (107.7 FM) licensed to Hico, Texas, United States, which held the call sign KHHG from 2010 to 2012
