= ANQ =

ANQ may refer to:

- ANQ (journal) (ANQ: American Notes and Queries), a quarterly academic journal
- Jarawa language (Andaman Islands) (ISO 639:anq)
- Archives nationales du Québec (National Archives of Quebec), now the Bibliothèque et Archives nationales du Québec, Canada
- Tri-State Steuben County Airport (IATA: ANQ)
