= RWN =

RWN may refer to:

- RWN, the FAA LID code for Arens Field, Winamac, Indiana
- RWN, the IATA code for Rivne International Airport, Rivne Oblast, Ukraine
- "Rapper Warrior Ninja", a recurring segment on The Eric Andre Show
