= Bloomington Airport =

Bloomington Airport may refer to:

- Central Illinois Regional Airport, Bloomington, IL
- Monroe County Airport (Indiana), Bloomington, IN
- Minneapolis–Saint Paul International Airport, Bloomington, MN
