= Monticello Airport =

Monticello Airport may refer to:

- Monticello Airport (New York) in Monticello, New York, United States (FAA: N37)
- Monticello Airport (Utah) in Monticello, Utah, United States (FAA: U43)
- Monticello Regional Airport, formerly Monticello Municipal Airport, in Monticello, Iowa, United States (FAA/IATA: MXO)
- Monticello Municipal Airport (Arkansas) in Monticello, Arkansas, United States (FAA: LLQ)

== See also ==
- Sullivan County International Airport in Monticello, New York, United States (FAA/IATA: MSV)
- Wayne County Airport (Kentucky) in Monticello, Kentucky, United States (FAA: EKQ)
- White County Airport in Monticello, Indiana, United States (FAA: MCX)
