= C97 =

C97 may refer to:

- Ruy Lopez chess openings ECO code
- Malignant neoplasms of independent (primary) multiple sites ICD-10 code
- Lowell Airport (Indiana), in Indiana FAA LID
- Migration for Employment Convention (Revised), 1949 ILO code

C-97 may refer to:

- C-97 Stratofreighter, an aircraft
