= GFD =

GFD may refer to:

== Transport ==
- Garfield railway station, in Victoria, Australia
- Glenfield railway station, Sydney, Australia
- Greenford station, in Greater London
- Pope Field (Indiana), an airport serving Greenfield, Indiana, United States

== Other uses ==
- General Film Distributors, a defunct British film distribution company
- Geophysical fluid dynamics
- Gluten-free diet
