= Sky King (disambiguation) =

Sky King was a 1950s American television drama show.

Sky King may also refer to:

== Aviation ==
- Sky King Airport, in Terre Haute, Indiana
- Songbird Airways, formerly named Sky King
- SkyKing Limited, a defunct airline

== People ==
- Richard "Beebo" Russell of the 2018 Horizon Air Bombardier Q400 incident
- Muné Tsenpo, Zhangzhung name of the 39th Emperor of Tibet
- Dave Kingman (born 1948), American baseball player

== Music ==
- The Sky Kings, an American country band
- A song from the 1981 album Horrendous Disc by Daniel Amos

== Other ==
- Emergency Action Message

== See also ==
- Sky Kingdom, a Malaysian religious commune
- Sky deity
