= Lowell Airport =

Lowell Airport can refer to:

- Lowell Airport (Indiana)
- Lowell Airport (Massachusetts)
