= Pope Field (disambiguation) =

Pope Field may refer to:

- Pope Field, formerly known as Pope Air Force Base, a military airfield in North Carolina, United States
- Pope Field (Indiana), a general aviation airfield in Indiana, United States

== See also ==
- Alexander Pope Field (1800–1876), a United States politician
