= Marion Municipal Airport (Indiana) =

Airport in Grant County, Indiana

- IATA: MZZ; ICAO: KMZZ; FAA LID: MZZ

Summary
- Airport type: Public
- Owner: City of Marion BOAC
- Serves: Marion, Indiana
- Elevation AMSL: 859 ft (262 m)
- Coordinates: 40°29′24″N 085°40′47″W

Map
- Location within Indiana Location within the United States

Runways
| Direction | Length | | Surface |
| Direction | ft | m | Surface |
|---|---|---|---|
| 4/22 | 6,011 | 1,832 | Asphalt |
| 15/33 | 3,456 | 1,053 | Asphalt |

Statistics
- Aircraft operations (2019): 10,873
- Based aircraft (2021): 40
- Source: Federal Aviation Administration

Marion Municipal Airport (IATA: MZZ, ICAO: KMZZ, FAA LID: MZZ) is located in Marion, in Grant County, Indiana, 3 miles (4.8 km) southwest of that municipality's city center. The FAA's National Plan of Integrated Airport Systems for 2021–2025 categorized it as a general aviation facility.

The airport saw commercial airline service by Lake Central Airlines using Douglas DC-3s beginning in 1956. Lake Central merged into Allegheny Airlines in 1968 using Aerospatiale N 262s before service was discontinued in 1970. The airport was then served by small commuter airlines during the 1970s.

== Facilities ==
The airport covers 506 acres (205 ha) at an elevation of 859 feet (262 m). It has two asphalt runways: 4/22 is 6,011 by 100 feet (1,832 x 30 m) and 15/33 is 3,456 by 100 feet (1,053 x 30 m).

In 2019 the airport had 10,873 aircraft operations, an average of 30 per day: 92% general aviation, 7% air taxi and 1% military. In December 2021, there were 40 aircraft based at this airport: 34 single-engine, 2 multi-engine, 2 jet and 2 helicopter.

== See also ==
- List of airports in Indiana
