= Grissom Aeroplex =

Grissom Aeroplex Grissom Air Reserve Base
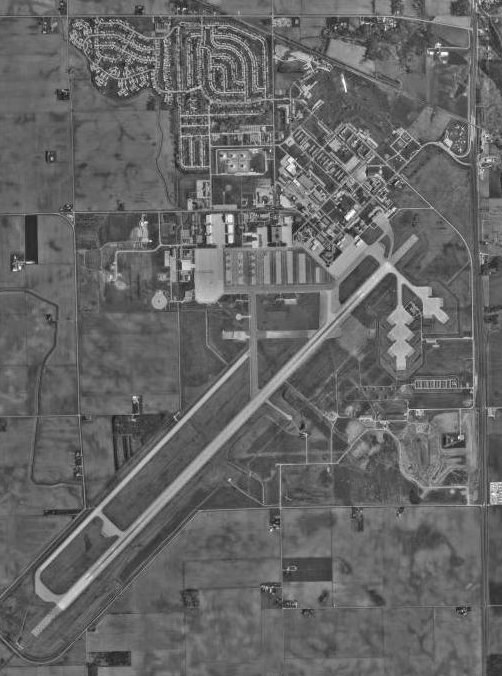
- USGS aerial image - 24 March 1998
- IATA: GUS; ICAO: KGUS; FAA LID: GUS

Summary
- Airport type: Public / Military
- Owner: Miami County Economic Development Authority
- Operator: Montgomery Aviation
- Location: Peru, Indiana
- Elevation AMSL: 812 ft (247 m)
- Coordinates: 40°38′53″N 086°09′08″W
- Website: MiamiCountyEDA.com
- Interactive map of Grissom Aeroplex

Runways
Direction	Length		Surface
Direction	ft	m	Surface
05/23	12,501	3,810	Asphalt
- Source: Federal Aviation Administration

Grissom Aeroplex (IATA: GUS, ICAO: KGUS, FAA LID: GUS) is a public/military airport in Miami and Cass counties, near Peru, Indiana. The airport is also located 11 miles (18 km) north of the city of Kokomo. It is the civil redevelopment of the former Grissom Air Force Base, which was realigned as part of the 1991 Base Realignment and Closure Commission process.

Grissom Aeroplex consists of 850+ acres and existing buildings under control of Miami County Economic Development Authority. It opened as a general aviation airport on 1 March 2008 with no commercial airline service scheduled. Miami County Aviation serves as the fixed-base operator for the civilian airport operations.

== Facilities ==
Grissom has one runway designated 05/23 with an asphalt surface measuring 12,501 by 200 feet (3,810 x 61 m).

The two large aircraft aprons on the South of the approach end of runway 23 have been permanently deactivated and are used for semi-trailer storage and American autocross racing.

== See also ==
- Virgil I. Grissom Municipal Airport – public use airport in Lawrence County near Bedford, Indiana
- List of airports in Indiana
