= New Castle-Henry County Municipal Airport =

Airport in Indiana, United States

- IATA: none; ICAO: KUWL; FAA LID: UWL

Summary
- Airport type: Public
- Owner: New Castle/Henry County
- Serves: New Castle, Indiana
- Elevation AMSL: 1,088 ft (332 m)
- Coordinates: 39°52′33″N 085°19′35″W

Map
- Location of airport in Indiana/United States UWL (the United States)

Runways
Direction	Length		Surface
Direction	ft	m	Surface
9/27	4,000	1,219	Asphalt

Statistics (2009)
- Aircraft operations: 5,854
- Based aircraft: 24
- Source: Federal Aviation Administration

New Castle-Henry County Municipal Airport (ICAO: KUWL, FAA LID: UWL) is a public use airport located four nautical miles (5 mi, 7 km) southeast of the central business district of New Castle, a city in Henry County, Indiana, United States. It is included in the National Plan of Integrated Airport Systems for 2011–2015, which categorized it as a general aviation facility.

Although most U.S. airports use the same three-letter location identifier for the FAA and IATA, this airport is assigned UWL by the FAA but has no designation from the IATA.

== Facilities and aircraft ==
New Castle-Henry County Municipal Airport covers an area of 32 acres (13 ha) at an elevation of 1,088 feet (332 m) above mean sea level. It has one runway designated 9/27 with an asphalt surface measuring 4,000 by 65 feet (1,219 x 20 m).

For the 12-month period ending December 31, 2009, the airport had 5,854 aircraft operations, an average of 16 per day: 96% general aviation and 4% air taxi. At that time there were 24 aircraft based at this airport: 79% single-engine, 17% multi-engine, and 4% ultralight.

== See also ==
- List of airports in Indiana
