= Starke County Airport =

- IATA: none; ICAO: KOXI; FAA LID: OXI

Summary
- Airport type: Public
- Owner: Starke County Airport Authority
- Location: Knox, Indiana
- Opened: April 1977
- Elevation AMSL: 685 ft / 208.8 m
- Coordinates: 41°19′47″N 86°39′44″W
- Website: http://www.starkecountyairport.com/index.html

Map
- Location of airport in Indiana OXI (the United States)

Runways
Direction	Length		Surface
Direction	ft	m	Surface
18/36	4,401	1,341	Asphalt
9/27	3,096	944	Turf

Starke County Airport (ICAO: KOXI, FAA LID: OXI) is a public airport 3 miles (4.8 km) northwest of Knox, in Starke County, Indiana. The airport was founded in April 1977.

The airport is home to iFLY Indiana Powered Paragliding. A United States Powered Paragliding Association (USPPA) approved Paramotor school. iFLY Indiana Powered Paragliding was founded in 2018 and is a full service school providing instruction, gear and service to the Powered Paragliding community.

The training field is one of the best in country as the property is surrounded by open farmland and very few obstacles.

== See also ==
- List of airports in Indiana
