= Randolph County Airport =

Airport in Randolph County, Indiana, United States

- IATA: none; ICAO: none; FAA LID: I22

Summary
- Airport type: Public
- Owner: Randolph County BOAC
- Location: Winchester, Indiana
- Elevation AMSL: 1,122.8 ft / 342.2 m
- Coordinates: 40°10′04″N 84°55′45″W
- Website: http://randolphcounty.us/departments/airport

Map
- Location of airport in Indiana I22 (the United States)

Runways
Direction	Length		Surface
Direction	ft	m	Surface
8/26	4,300	1,311	Asphalt

Randolph County Airport (I22) is a public airport 3 miles (4.8 km) east of Winchester, in Randolph County, Indiana. The airport was founded in June 1948. An estimated 82 aircraft land or take off from the airport each week. 50% of those are transient general aviation aircraft, 47% are local aviation enthusiasts or local businesses, and 3% are air taxi services bringing people to or flying people out of the airport.

== See also ==
- List of airports in Indiana
