= Skylane Airport =

Public Use Airport in Evansville, Indiana

Coordinates: 38°00′45″N 087°35′41″W

Skylane Airport is a public use airport located 1 mile northwest of Evansville, Indiana. The airport is privately owned by the Skylane Pilots Association. It is 4 miles northeast of Evansville Regional Airport.

The airport serves as a hub of sorts for small, homebuilt, and experimental aircraft.

== Facilities ==
The airport has one runway, designated as runway 18/36. It measures 2227 x 142 ft (679 x 43 m) and is made of turf. There is a 400-foot stopway on the north end of the runway and a 500 ft stopway at the south end, and it is marked with L-shaped mats painted white.

The airport has an FBO operated by the Skylane Pilot Association providing fuel to local and transient pilots. A lounge, restrooms, showers, and a weather briefing station are also available

== Aircraft ==
For the 12-month period ending December 31, 2019, the airport averages 105 operations per week, or about 5,500 per year. All of the traffic is general aviation. For the same time period, there are 43 aircraft based on the field, all single-engine airplanes.

== See also ==
- List of airports in Indiana
