= Lee Bottom Airport =

Lee Bottom Airport (Lee Bottom Flying Field)
- IATA: none; ICAO: none; FAA LID: 64I

Summary
- Airport type: Privately Owned, Public Use
- Owner: Rich and Ginger Davidson
- Location: Hanover, Indiana
- Elevation AMSL: 470 ft / 143 m
- Coordinates: 38°37′53″N 085°26′36″W
- Website: Lee Bottom Airport

Map
- Location of airport in Indiana

Runways
Direction	Length		Surface
Direction	ft	m	Surface
18/36	4,080	1,244	Turf

Lee Bottom Airport (FAA LID: 64I) is a privately owned and public use airport 6 miles (9.7 km) south of Hanover, in Jefferson County, Indiana. The airport was re-opened in April 1991.

== See also ==
- List of airports in Indiana
