= Mishawaka Pilots Club Airport =

- IATA: none; ICAO: none; FAA LID: 3C1

Summary
- Airport type: Public
- Owner: Airport Reality Board
- Serves: Elkhart, Indiana
- Location: Osceola, Indiana
- Elevation AMSL: 755 ft / 230 m
- Coordinates: 41°39′25″N 086°02′05″W
- Website: Mishawakapilotsclub.com

Map
- Location of airport in Indiana

Runways
Direction	Length		Surface
Direction	ft	m	Surface
3/21	2,243	684	Asphalt
12/30	3,140	957	Turf

== History ==
Mishawaka Pilots Club Airport (FAA LID: 3C1) is in Osceola, Indiana, three miles southwest of Elkhart.

Founded in 1947, The Mishawaka Pilots Club has a long history in the Michiana community for providing a path to economical flight instruction, rental, and aircraft ownership. The Club promotes responsible airmanship and strives to keep a safe and clean presence for our neighbors. The annual Fathers Day Fly-In and Pancake Breakfast has provided many area residents with their first airplane ride. The MPC has over 100 current members, and is home to approximately 65 airplanes including single engine, multi-engine, ultralights, light sport, home builts, and helicopters. There is currently Hangar space available in several sizes for purchase and possibly rental. The club has a heated and air conditioned club house where our monthly meetings are held on the 1ST Thursday of every month at 7:00 PM. Anyone interested in learning more about joining the club are welcome to attend — you don't have to be a pilot or aircraft owner to attend or join the club.

== In the News ==
News station WNDU-TV covered the solo of 16 year old Brady Ornat in January 2021. In July, 2022, it was announced that USMC pilot, and former student at the Mishawaka Pilots Club, Samuel Petko was selected to join the Blue Angels.

== See also ==
- List of airports in Indiana
