= Sheridan Airport =

- IATA: none; ICAO: none; FAA LID: 5I4

Summary
- Airport type: Public
- Location: Sheridan
- Elevation AMSL: 936 ft / 285.3 m
- Coordinates: 40°10′36″N 86°13′04″W
- Website: sheridanairport.com

Map
- Location of airport in Indiana/United States 5I4 (the United States)

Runways
Direction	Length		Surface
Direction	ft	m	Surface
5/23	3,760	1,146	Asphalt
9/27	3,590	1,094	Turf

Sheridan Airport (5I4) is a public use airport located 3 miles (4.8 km) north of Sheridan, in Hamilton County, Indiana, United States.

== History ==
The airport was founded in June 1947. Construction began in 1946, and airport operations began in 1948.

Originally built to satisfy the business transportation needs of Ken Biddle, founder of Biddle Precision Components, a precision machine shop and Sheridan's largest employer, the airport soon grew to support the needs of Northwest Hamilton County.

The current airport office building started as the base for Biddle's personal aircraft, a new but modest two-place Alon Ercoupe. In a few years, Sheridan was home to Biddle's series of new Cessna 310 twins during the 1950s and 60s. The 310 was the top of the business aircraft produced by Cessna in that era.

By the early 1950s, aviation had taken off in the United States, both as a business tool and for recreation. This necessitated the construction of the 12-unit T-hangar which is still in use today, housing recreational and training aircraft.

By the late 1960s, Sheridan Airport was housing a Cessna 421 cabin class twin in a newly constructed hangar capable of accommodating larger business aircraft. This hangar was at one time leased by United Feeds for their Cessna 414, a modern derivative of the 421.

During these years both a flight school and maintenance facility began operation at the airport. Flight schools have come and gone over the years, and once again an active training facility is housed on the field, with one aircraft based on the field and a variety of others available by appointment.

The current 3,760 ft × 50 ft (1,146 m × 15 m) asphalt paved runway was constructed in 1967 and has received constant maintenance and upgrades throughout the years. It was built to complement the two existing grass runways at Sheridan Airport and provide all-weather access.

During the early 1970s, an additional 14-unit T-hangar was constructed to house the growing mix of business and recreational aircraft seeking to locate at Sheridan.

In 2001, another 12-unit hangar was constructed and filled before completion, due to the rising need for hangar space on the north side of Indianapolis.

== See also ==
- List of airports in Indiana
