= Delphi Municipal Airport =

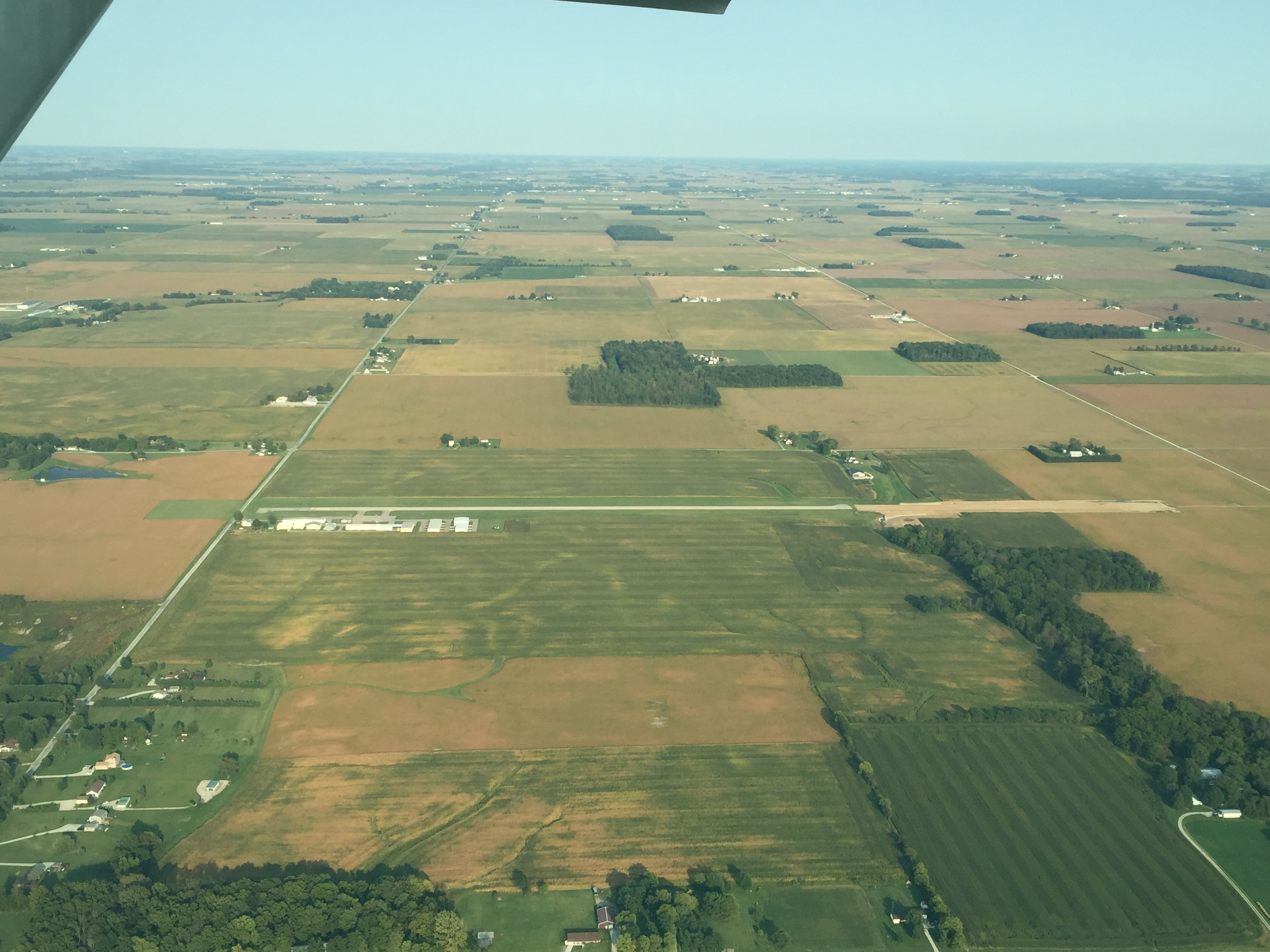
- IATA: none; ICAO: none; FAA LID: 1I9

Summary
- Airport type: Public
- Owner: City of Delphi
- Location: Delphi, Indiana
- Elevation AMSL: 671 ft / 205 m
- Coordinates: 40°32′33″N 86°40′53″W
- Website: https://www.delphimunicipalairport.com/

Map
- Location of airport in Indiana 1I9 (the United States)

Runways
Direction	Length		Surface
Direction	ft	m	Surface
18/36	2,898	883	Concrete

The Delphi Municipal Airport (1I9) is a public airport 3 miles (4.8 km) south of Delphi, in Carroll County, Indiana, United States. The airport was founded in November 1969 by two local farmers. In the early 1980s, ownership transferred to the City of Delphi. The Board of Aviation Commissioners (BOAC) works alongside the airport manager in managing the airport.

== Facilities and aircraft ==
The airport has one runway (18/36) that is currently 2,898 feet long. On each end there are turn-pads as there is no parallel taxiway to the runway. As of 2017, the airport was working to extend the runway to 4250 feet. The Federal Aviation Administration will fund 90%, Indiana Department of Transportation 4% and 6% by the City of Delphi. The work was scheduled to be completed in early 2018, but, as of October, 2017, the work has been postponed due to inclement weather, and is scheduled to resume in the spring of 2018 on a date to be determined.

Equipped with a self-service fuel pump, the airport caters to general aviation traffic. The airport has 11 buildings including a small terminal building that contains a lobby, conference area, an office, and a living room. There are 36 hangars total. Plans for a new terminal building, more hangars, a parallel runway, and a crosswind runway are in the works.

== See also ==
- List of airports in Indiana
