= Salem Municipal Airport (Indiana) =

- IATA: none; ICAO: none; FAA LID: I83

Summary
- Airport type: Public
- Owner: Salem Board of Aviation Commissioners
- Serves: Salem, Indiana
- Coordinates: 38°36′07″N 086°08′24″W

Map
- Location of airport in Indiana I83 (the United States)

Runways
Direction	Length		Surface
Direction	ft	m	Surface
08/26	3,000	914	Asphalt

Statistics (2019)
- Aircraft operations: 5,464
- Based aircraft: 39
- Source: Federal Aviation Administration

Salem Municipal Airport (FAA LID: I83) is a city-owned, public-use airport located two nautical miles (4 km) west of the central business district of Salem, a city in Washington County, Indiana, United States. It is included in the National Plan of Integrated Airport Systems for 2011–2015, which categorized it as a general aviation facility.

== Facilities and aircraft ==
Salem Municipal Airport covers an area of 114 acres (46 ha) at an elevation of 840 feet (256 m) above mean sea level. It has one runway designated 8/26 with an asphalt surface measuring 3,000 by 75 feet (914 x 23 m).

For the 12-month period ending December 31, 2019, the airport had 5,464 aircraft operations, an average of 15 per day: all general aviation. At that time there were 39 aircraft based at this airport: 35 single-engine, 1 multi-engine, 1 helicopter, and 2 ultralight.

== See also ==
- List of airports in Indiana
