= Boyer Flight Park =

- IATA: none; ICAO: none; FAA LID: 7W7

Summary
- Airport type: Public use
- Owner: Gayle High
- Serves: Burnettsville, Indiana
- Location: Carroll County, Indiana
- Elevation AMSL: 710 ft (220 m)
- Coordinates: 40°43′12″N 086°36′58″W

Map
- Location of airport in Indiana

Runways
Direction	Length		Surface
Direction	ft	m	Surface
18/36	1,770	539	Turf

Statistics (2010)
- Aircraft operations: 218
- Based aircraft: 2
- Source: Federal Aviation Administration

Boyer Flight Park (FAA LID: 7W7) is a public use ultralight airport in Carroll County, Indiana, United States. It is located four nautical miles (7 km) southwest of the central business district of Burnettsville, a town in White County.

== Facilities and aircraft ==
Boyer Flight Park covers an area of 7 acres (3 ha) at an elevation of 710 feet (216 m) above mean sea level. It has one runway designated 18/36 with a turf surface measuring 1,770 by 120 feet (539 x 37 m).

For the 12-month period ending December 31, 2010, the airport had 218 general aviation aircraft operations, an average of 18 per month. There are two ultralight aircraft based at this airport.

== See also ==
- List of airports in Indiana
