= Michigan City Municipal Airport =

- IATA: MGC; ICAO: KMGC; FAA LID: MGC

Summary
- Airport type: Public
- Owner: Michigan City Board of Aviation Commissioners
- Serves: Michigan City, Indiana
- Opened: April 1940
- Elevation AMSL: 655 ft / 200 m
- Coordinates: 41°42′12″N 086°49′16″W
- Website: www.MGCairport.com

Map
- Location of airport in Indiana MGC (the United States)

Runways
Direction	Length		Surface
Direction	ft	m	Surface
2/20	4,100	1,250	Asphalt

Statistics (2005)
- Aircraft operations: 7,783
- Based aircraft: 50
- Source: Federal Aviation Administration

Michigan City Municipal Airport (IATA: MGC, ICAO: KMGC, FAA LID: MGC) is a public use airport located three nautical miles (6 km) east of the central business district of Michigan City, in LaPorte County, Indiana, United States. The airport is publicly owned by the Michigan City Board of Aviation Commissioners.

== Facilities and aircraft ==
Michigan City Municipal Airport covers an area of 285 acres (115 ha) at an elevation of 655 feet (200 m) above mean sea level. It has one paved runway designated 2/20 with an asphalt surface measuring 4,100 by 75 feet (1,250 x 23 m).

For the 12-month period ending December 31, 2005, the airport had 7,783 aircraft operations, an average of 21 per day: 90% general aviation and 10% air taxi. At that time there were 50 aircraft based at this airport: 78% single-engine, 14% multi-engine, 2% jet, 2% helicopter and 4% glider.

== Awards ==
Michigan City Municipal Airport received the 2007 Airport of the Year Award. This award is given jointly by the Aviation Association of Indiana (AAI), the Aircraft Owners and Pilots Association (AOPA), the Federal Aviation Administration (FAA), the Indiana Department of Transportation – Office of Aviation, and aviation industry sponsors to annually recognize an outstanding airport.

== See also ==
- List of airports in Indiana
