= Plymouth Municipal Airport (Indiana) =

- IATA: PLY; ICAO: none; FAA LID: C65

Summary
- Airport type: Public
- Owner: Plymouth BOAC
- Serves: Plymouth, Indiana
- Elevation AMSL: 800 ft / 244 m
- Coordinates: 41°21′54″N 086°18′01″W

Map
- Location of airport in Indiana C65 (the United States)

Runways
Direction	Length		Surface
Direction	ft	m	Surface
10/28	4,400	1,341	Asphalt

Statistics (2009)
- Aircraft operations: 5,830
- Based aircraft: 16
- Source: Federal Aviation Administration

Plymouth Municipal Airport (IATA: PLY, FAA LID: C65) is a public use airport located two nautical miles (4 km) north of the central business district of Plymouth, a city in Marshall County, Indiana, United States. It is owned by the Plymouth Board of Aviation of Commissioners. This airport is included in the National Plan of Integrated Airport Systems for 2011–2015, which categorized it as a general aviation facility.

== Facilities and aircraft ==
Plymouth Municipal Airport covers an area of 192 acres (78 ha) at an elevation of 800 feet (244 m) above mean sea level. It has one runway designated 10/28 with an asphalt surface measuring 4,400 by 60 feet (1,341 x 18 m).

For the 12-month period ending December 31, 2009, the airport had 5,830 aircraft operations, an average of 15 per day: 80% general aviation and 20% air taxi. At that time there were 16 aircraft based at this airport: 94% single-engine and 6% jet.

== See also ==
- List of airports in Indiana
