= Johnsons Strawberry Farm Airport =

- IATA: none; ICAO: none; FAA LID: 9IN3

Summary
- Airport type: Private
- Owner: Rodney Johnson
- Location: Hobart, Indiana
- Elevation AMSL: 620 ft (190 m)
- Coordinates: 41°33′25″N 087°13′35″W
- Interactive map of Johnsons Strawberry Farm Airport

Runways
Direction	Length		Surface
Direction	ft	m	Surface
18/36	2,000	610	Turf
- Source: Federal Aviation Administration

Johnsons Strawberry Farm Airport (FAA LID: 9IN3) is a private-use airport located three miles (5 km) northeast of the central business district of Hobart, a city in Lake County, Indiana, United States. This airport is privately owned by Rodney Johnson.

== Facilities ==
Johnsons Strawberry Farm Airport has one runway:

- Runway 18/36: 2,000 x 60 ft. (610 x 18 m), Surface: Turf

== See also ==
- List of airports in Indiana
