= Logansport/Cass County Airport =

- IATA: none; ICAO: KGGP; FAA LID: GGP

Summary
- Airport type: Public
- Owner: Logansport Cass County Airport Authority
- Operator: Logansport Cass County Airport Authority
- Location: Logansport, Indiana
- Elevation AMSL: 738 ft / 224.9 m
- Coordinates: 40°42′40″N 86°22′28″W
- Website: http://www.lccaa.info/

Map
- Location of airport in Indiana GGP (the United States)

Runways
Direction	Length		Surface
Direction	ft	m	Surface
9/27	5,001	1,524	Asphalt

Logansport/ Cass County Airport (ICAO: KGGP, FAA LID: GGP) is a public airport 2 miles (3.2 km) south of Logansport, in Cass County, Indiana. The airport was founded in November 1959.

As of 2015, the airport has been the home of Air Indiana Skydiving Center.

== See also ==
- List of airports in Indiana
