= Virgil I. Grissom Municipal Airport =

- IATA: BFR; ICAO: KBFR; FAA LID: BFR

Summary
- Airport type: Public
- Owner: Lawrence County BOAC
- Serves: Bedford, Indiana
- Elevation AMSL: 728 ft / 222 m
- Coordinates: 38°50′24″N 086°26′43″W

Map
- Location of airport in Indiana BFR (the United States)

Runways
Direction	Length		Surface
Direction	ft	m	Surface
13/31	4,501	1,372	Concrete
6/24	3,002	942	Concrete

Statistics (2019)
- Aircraft operations: 5,858
- Based aircraft: 26
- Source: Federal Aviation Administration

Virgil I. Grissom Municipal Airport (IATA: BFR, ICAO: KBFR, FAA LID: BFR) is a public use airport located three nautical miles (6 km) southeast of the central business district of Bedford, a city in Lawrence County, Indiana, United States.

The airport is named in honor of Virgil I. Grissom (1926–1967), an Indiana native and U.S. Air Force pilot who was one of the original NASA Project Mercury astronauts.

== Facilities and aircraft ==
Virgil I. Grissom Municipal Airport covers an area of 145 acres (59 ha) at an elevation of 728 feet (222 m) above mean sea level. It has two asphalt paved runways: 13/31 is 4,501 by 100 feet (1,372 x 30 m) and 6/24 is 3,089 by 70 feet (942 x 21 m).

For the 12-month period ending December 30, 2007, the airport had 5,110 aircraft operations, an average of 14 per day: 93% general aviation, 4% air taxi and 3% military. At that time there were 35 aircraft based at this airport: 97% single-engine and 3% multi-engine.

== See also ==
- Grissom Aeroplex – public/military airport in Miami and Cass counties, near Peru, Indiana
- List of airports in Indiana
