= Paoli Municipal Airport =

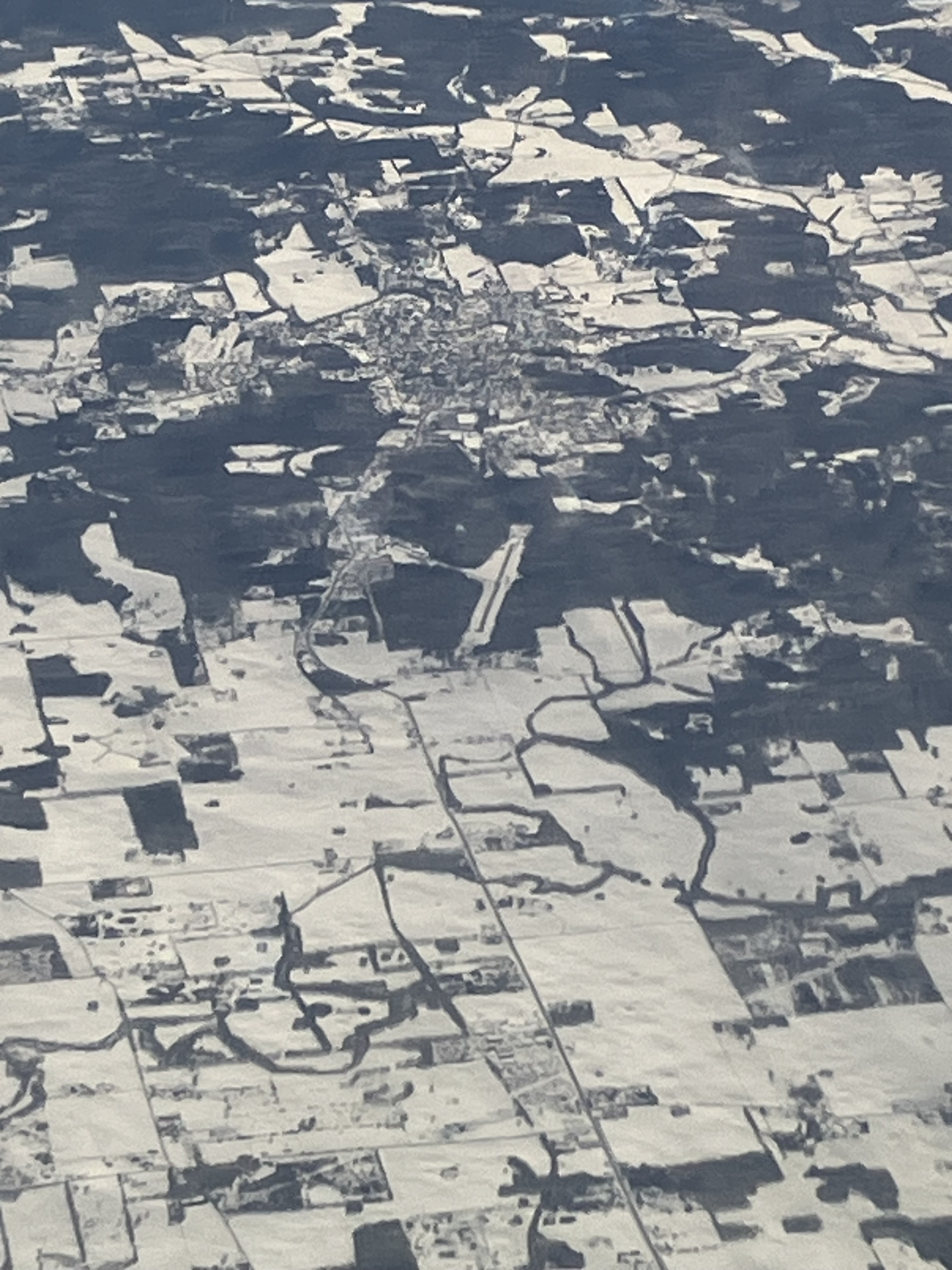
- Paoli Municipal Airport (center) and Paoli (center-top)
- IATA: none; ICAO: none; FAA LID: I42

Summary
- Airport type: Public
- Owner: Paoli BOAC
- Location: Paoli, Indiana
- Elevation AMSL: 816.2 ft / 248.8 m
- Coordinates: 38°35′07″N 86°27′53″W
- Website: http://www.paoliairport.com/Pages/default.aspx

Map
- Location of airport in Indiana I42 (the United States)

Runways
Direction	Length		Surface
Direction	ft	m	Surface
2/20	2,793	851	Asphalt

Paoli Municipal Airport (I42) is a public airport 2 miles (3.2 km) north of Paoli, in Orange County, Indiana. The airport was founded in July 1947.

== See also ==
- List of airports in Indiana
