= Decatur Hi-Way Airport =

- IATA: DCR; ICAO: KDCR; FAA LID: DCR

Summary
- Airport type: Public
- Serves: Decatur, Indiana
- Elevation AMSL: 842 ft / 257 m
- Coordinates: 40°50′15″N 084°51′45″W

Map
- Location of airport in Indiana

Runways
| Direction | Length | | Surface |
| Direction | ft | m | Surface |
|---|---|---|---|
| 18/36 | 2,009 | 612 | Turf |
- Source: Federal Aviation Administration

Decatur Hi-Way Airport (IATA: DCR, ICAO: KDCR, FAA LID: DCR) was a public use airport located three nautical miles (5.5 km) east of the central business district of Decatur, a city in Adams County Indiana, United States.

== Facilities and operations ==
Decatur Hi-Way Airport was situated at an elevation of 842 feet (257 m) above mean sea level. It had one runway designated 18/36 with a turf surface measuring 2,009 by 180 feet (612 x 55 m). The airport had 33 aircraft operations per day: 73% local general aviation and 27% transient general aviation.

== See also ==
- List of airports in Indiana
