= Walker/Rowe Waterloo Airport =

- IATA: none; ICAO: none; FAA LID: 4C2

Summary
- Airport type: Public use
- Owner: Richard D. Rowe
- Serves: Waterloo, Indiana
- Elevation AMSL: 900 ft / 274 m
- Coordinates: 41°25′52″N 084°58′54″W

Map
- Location of airport in Indiana

Runways
| Direction | Length | | Surface |
| Direction | ft | m | Surface |
|---|---|---|---|
| 9/27 | 2,340 | 713 | Turf |

Statistics (2009)
- Aircraft operations: 2,739
- Based aircraft: 11
- Source: Federal Aviation Administration

Walker/Rowe Waterloo Airport (FAA LID: 4C2) is a privately owned, public use airport located three nautical miles (6 km) east of the central business district of Waterloo, a town in DeKalb County, Indiana, United States.

== Facilities and aircraft ==
Walker/Rowe Waterloo Airport covers an area of 25 acres (10 ha) at an elevation of 900 feet (274 m) above mean sea level. It has one runway designated 9/27 with a turf surface measuring 2,340 by 100 feet (713 x 30 m).

For the 12-month period ending December 31, 2009, the airport had 2,739 general aviation aircraft operations, an average of 228 per month. At that time there were 11 aircraft based at this airport: 54.5% ultralight and 45.5% single-engine.

== See also ==
- List of airports in Indiana
