= Harrold Airport =

- IATA: none; ICAO: none; FAA LID: IN16

Summary
- Airport type: Public
- Owner: Robert K. Harrold
- Serves: Butler, Indiana
- Elevation AMSL: 925 ft (282 m)
- Coordinates: 41°28′34″N 084°54′22″W

Map
- Location of airport in Indiana

Runways
Direction	Length		Surface
Direction	ft	m	Surface
18/36	2,920	890	Gravel

Statistics (2009)
- Aircraft operations: 872
- Based aircraft: 2
- Source: Federal Aviation Administration

Harrold Airport (FAA LID: IN16) is a public use airport in DeKalb County, Indiana, United States. It is located three nautical miles (6 km) northwest of the central business district of Butler, Indiana.

== Facilities and aircraft ==
Harrold Airport covers an area of 10 acres (4 ha) at an elevation of 925 feet (282 m) above mean sea level. It has one runway designated 18/36 with a gravel surface measuring 2,920 by 46 feet (890 x 14 m).

For the 12-month period ending December 31, 2009, the airport had 872 general aviation aircraft operations, an average of 72 per month. There are two single-engine aircraft based at this airport.

== See also ==
- List of airports in Indiana
