= Pam's Place Airport =

- IATA: none; ICAO: none; FAA LID: 78I

Summary
- Airport type: Public
- Owner: Pam's Place, Inc.
- Serves: Eminence, Indiana
- Elevation AMSL: 795 ft / 242 m
- Coordinates: 39°30′03″N 086°41′25″W
- Interactive map of Pam's Place Airport

Runways
Direction	Length		Surface
Direction	ft	m	Surface
10/28	3,630	1,106	Turf
18/36	1,629	497	Turf

Statistics (2019)
- Aircraft operations: 3,850
- Based aircraft: 20
- Source: Federal Aviation Administration

Pam's Place Airport (FAA LID: 78I) is a public-use airport in Putnam County, Indiana, United States. It is located three nautical miles (6 km) southwest of Eminence, an unincorporated town in Adams Township, Morgan County.

== Facilities and aircraft ==
Pam's Place Airport covers an area of 150 acres (61 ha) at an elevation of 795 feet (242 m) above mean sea level. It has two runways, both with a turf surface. One is designated 10/28, measuring 3,630 by 100 feet (1,106 x 30 m). The other is designated 18/36, measuring 1,629 by 100 feet (497 x 30 m).

For the 12-month period ending December 31, 2019, the airport had 3,850 general aviation aircraft operations, an average of about 10 per day. At that time there were 20 aircraft based at this airport: 35% single-engine, 20% helicopter and 45% ultralight.

== See also ==
- List of airports in Indiana
