= Porter County Regional Airport =

- IATA: VPZ; ICAO: KVPZ; FAA LID: VPZ

Summary
- Airport type: Public
- Owner: Porter County Municipal Airport Authority
- Location: Valparaiso, Indiana
- Opened: November 1950
- Elevation AMSL: 770 ft / 235 m
- Coordinates: 41°27′14″N 087°00′26″W
- Website: www.VPZ.org

Map
- Location of airport in Indiana VPZ (the United States)

Runways
Direction	Length		Surface
Direction	ft	m	Surface
9/27	7,001	2,134	Asphalt
18/36	4,001	1,220	Asphalt

Statistics
- Aircraft operations (2013): 69,888
- Based aircraft (2017): 146
- Source: Federal Aviation Administration

Porter County Regional Airport (IATA: VPZ, ICAO: KVPZ, FAA LID: VPZ) (formerly Porter County Municipal Airport) is a public use airport one mile (1.6 km) southeast of the central business district of Valparaiso, a city in Porter County, Indiana, United States. The Porter County Municipal Airport Authority owns the airport.

== Facilities and aircraft ==
Porter County Regional Airport covers 718 acres (291 ha) at an elevation of 770 feet (235 m) above mean sea level. It has two asphalt paved runways: 9/27 is 7,001 by 150 feet (2,134 x 46 m) and 18/36 is 4,001 by 75 feet (1,220 x 23 m).

For period ending December 31, 2013, the airport had 69,888 aircraft operations, an average of 191 per day: 97% general aviation, 2% air taxi and 1% military. In January 2017, there were 146 aircraft based at this airport: 128 single-engine, 7 multi-engine, 6 jet, 4 helicopter and 1 ultralight.

== See also ==
- List of airports in Indiana
