= Flora Municipal Airport =

Airport in Flora, Indiana

Coordinates: 40°32′23″N 86°32′55″W

Flora Municipal Airport (5I2) is a publicly owned, public use airport located in Flora in the U.S. state of Indiana. The airport was established in February 1967.

== Facilities ==
The airport has a single turf runway designated as runway 9/27 that measures 2143 ft x 93 ft. For the 12-month period ending December 31, 2019, airport averages 38 aircraft operations per week, or about 2,000 per year. For the same time, there were 7 aircraft based on the field: 4 single-engine airplanes and 3 ultralights. There is no FBO on the field. As of 2011, a private skydiving company operated on the premises.

== Incidents ==
- On March 22, 1985, a Cessna 210 Centurion was destroyed while attempting to land at Flora. The pilot encountered IFR conditions while en route to Indianapolis. After reversing course, the pilot lost electrical power. Upon seeing Flora Municipal through breaks in the overcast layer below him. After manually extending the landing gear, the pilot attempted to long but went long, overrunning the departure end of the runway into a ditch. The cause of the electrical failure was found to be a burned lead on an alternator. The pilot received minor injuries.
- On May 9, 2012, a Bell 206B helicopter impacted terrain in Flora while spraying a wheat field. The sole pilot onboard was not injured. The probable cause of the accident was the pilot allowing the helicopter to settle with power on.

== See also ==
- List of airports in Indiana
