= Ed-Air Airport =

- IATA: OTN; ICAO: none; FAA LID: 2IG4

Summary
- Airport type: Private use
- Owner: Edward A. Huddleston
- Serves: Oaktown, Indiana
- Elevation AMSL: 426 ft (130 m)
- Coordinates: 38°51′05″N 087°29′59″W

Map
- Location of airport in Indiana

Runways
Direction	Length		Surface
Direction	ft	m	Surface
18/36	5,800	1,768	Asphalt

Statistics
- Based aircraft: 4
- Source: Federal Aviation Administration

Ed-Air Airport (IATA: OTN, FAA LID: 2IG4, formerly OTN) is a private use airport in Knox County, Indiana, United States. It is located three nautical miles (6 km) southwest of the central business district of Oaktown, Indiana, and was previously a public use airport.

== History ==
The airfield was built between 1943 and 1944. It was known as Emison Field or George Field Auxiliary, operated as a satellite of George Army Airfield. It was closed by the military after World War II. It later operated as a civil airfield known as Emison Airport or Green Airport.

== Facilities and aircraft ==
Ed-Air Airport resides at elevation of 426 feet (130 m) above mean sea level. It has one runway designated 18/36 with an asphalt surface measuring 5,800 by 100 feet (1,768 x 30 m).

There are four aircraft based at this airport: one single-engine, two multi-engine, and one helicopter.

== See also ==
- Indiana World War II Army Airfields
- List of airports in Indiana
