= Noblesville Airport =

- IATA: none; ICAO: none; FAA LID: I80

Summary
- Airport type: Public
- Owner: Don Roberts and Larry Jacobi
- Location: Noblesville, Indiana
- Elevation AMSL: 821 ft (250 m)
- Coordinates: 40°00′12.6″N 085°57′52.3″W

Map
- Location of airport in Indiana

Runways
Direction	Length		Surface
Direction	ft	m	Surface
9/27	3,580	1,091	Turf
- Source: Federal Aviation Administration

Noblesville Airport (FAA LID: I80) is a public use airport located three nautical miles (6 km) southeast of Noblesville, Indiana. The airfield is one of five public airfields in Hamilton County, Indiana. The airfield is owned by Don Roberts and Larry Jacobi.

The airfield is also home to Experimental Aircraft Association (EAA) Chapter 67.

== History ==
Noblesville Airport was originally located 2.5 nm (4.6 km) northwest of its present location, on the current site of the Hamilton County Fairgrounds.

== Facilities and aircraft ==
Noblesville Airport has a 3,580 ft × 100 ft runway with a turf surface on heading 09/27.

For the 12-month period ending in December 2019, the airport had approximately 7,000 general aviation operations (an average of 19 per day). At the time of last inspection there were 24 aircraft based at the airfield.

== See also ==
- List of airports in Indiana
