= Morrison Flight Park =

- IATA: none; ICAO: none; FAA LID: 0IN6

Summary
- Airport type: Private
- Owner: Lester W. Morrison
- Location: Linton, Indiana
- Elevation AMSL: 520 ft / 158 m
- Coordinates: 39°01′18″N 087°11′13″W

Map
- Location of airport in Indiana

Runways
Direction	Length		Surface
Direction	ft	m	Surface
18U/36U	1,225	373	Turf

Statistics (2003)
- Aircraft operations: 420
- Based aircraft: 4
- Source: Federal Aviation Administration

Morrison Flight Park (FAA LID: 0IN6, formerly 4U8) is a private use ultralight airport in Greene County, Indiana, United States. It is located two nautical miles (4 km) southwest of the central business district of Linton, Indiana, and was previously a public use airport.

== Facilities and aircraft ==
Morrison Flight Park resides at elevation of 520 feet (158 m) above mean sea level. It has one runway designated 18U/36U with a turf surface measuring 1,225 by 70 feet (373 x 21 m).

For the 12-month period ending December 31, 2003, the airport had 420 general aviation aircraft operations, an average of 35 per month. There are four ultralight aircraft based at this airport.

== See also ==
- List of airports in Indiana
