= FRH =

FRH can refer to:

- Familial renal hypouricemia
- Flameless ration heater
- Frankfurt Rödelheim station, in Germany
- French Lick Municipal Airport, in Indiana, United States
- Future for Religious Heritage, a Belgian heritage organization
- National Technological University – Haedo Regional Faculty (Spanish: Universidad Tecnológica Nacional - Facultad Regional Haedo), in Argentina
- Romanian Handball Federation (Romanian: Federaţia Română de Handbal)
