= Peru Municipal Airport =

- IATA: none; ICAO: none; FAA LID: I76

Summary
- Airport type: Public
- Owner: Peru BOAC
- Location: Peru, Indiana
- Elevation AMSL: 779 ft / 237.4 m
- Coordinates: 40°47′11″N 86°08′47″W
- Website: http://www.cityofperu.org/airport.html

Map
- Location of airport in Indiana I76 (the United States)

Runways
Direction	Length		Surface
Direction	ft	m	Surface
1/19	4,400	1,341	Asphalt

Peru Municipal Airport (I76) is a public airport 4 miles (6.4 km) northwest of Peru, in Miami County, Indiana. The airport was founded in March 1971.

== See also ==
- List of airports in Indiana
