= Goshen Municipal Airport =

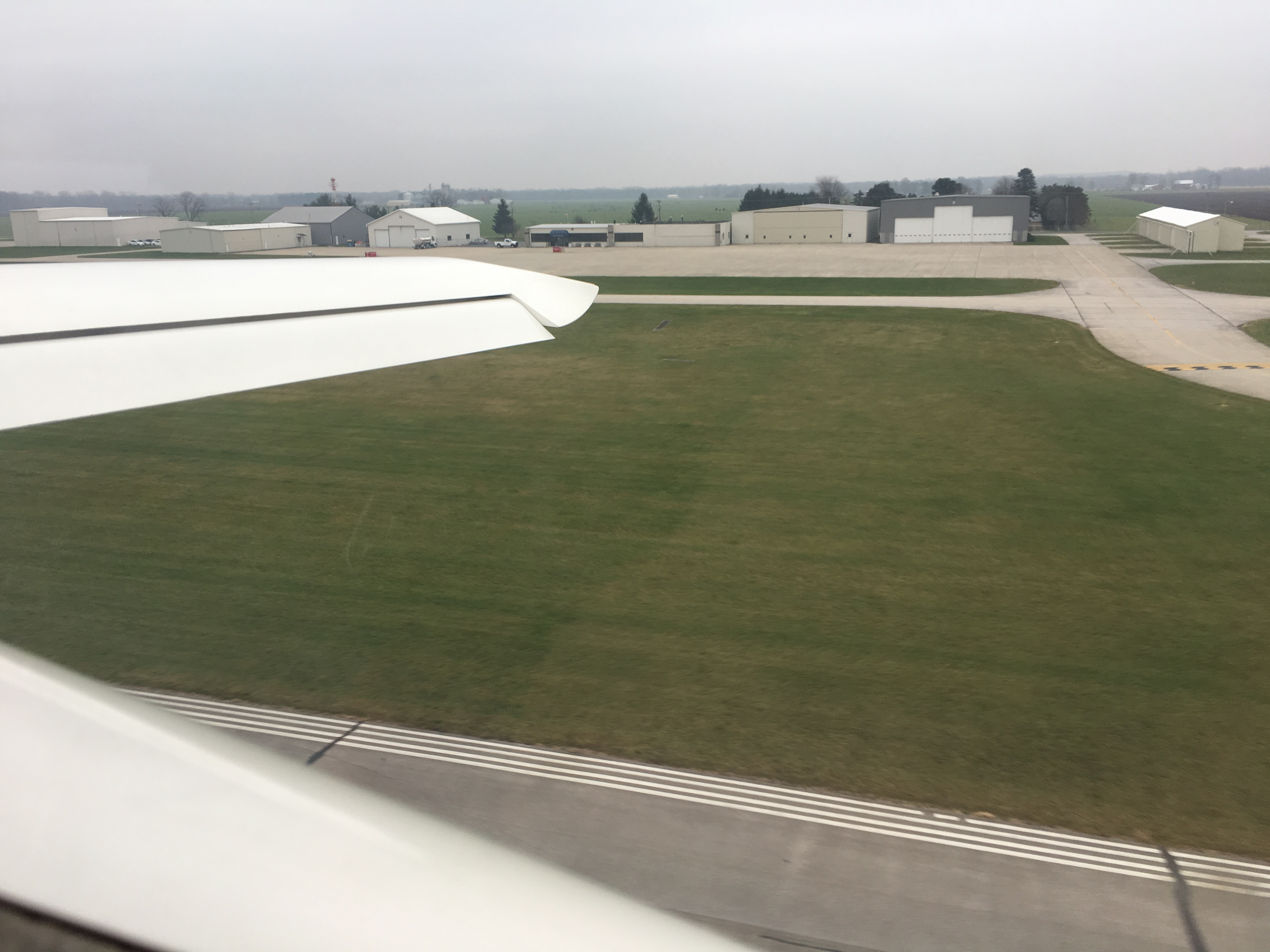
- IATA: GSH; ICAO: KGSH; FAA LID: GSH

Summary
- Airport type: Public
- Owner: Goshen BOAC
- Serves: Goshen, Indiana
- Elevation AMSL: 827 ft (252 m)
- Coordinates: 41°31′35″N 085°47′39″W

Map
- Location within Indiana Location within the United States

Runways
Direction	Length		Surface
Direction	ft	m	Surface
9/27	6,050	1,844	Asphalt
5/23	2,497	761	Turf

Statistics (2010)
- Aircraft operations: 27,702
- Based aircraft: 60
- Source: Federal Aviation Administration

Goshen Municipal Airport (IATA: GSH, ICAO: KGSH, FAA LID: GSH) is a public-use civil airport three miles southeast of Goshen, in Elkhart County, Indiana. It is owned by the Goshen Board of Aviation Commissioners. The National Plan of Integrated Airport Systems for 2011–2015 categorized it as a general aviation facility.

The airport is host to America's Freedom Fest, which advertises itself as among the country's biggest single-day airshows.

== Facilities ==
The airport covers 439 acres (178 ha) at an elevation of 827 feet (252 m). It has two runways: 9/27 is 6,050 by 100 feet (1,844 x 30 m) asphalt and 5/23 is 2,497 by 180 feet (761 x 55 m) turf.

For the 12-month period ending December 21, 2019, the airport averaged 59 aircraft movements per day, or roughly 21,535 per year. The operations are 97% general aviation and 3% air taxi.

During April–May 2026, the runway underwent a reconstruction project. The runway was originally expected to reopen May 22, 2026, but work was completed earlier and the runway reopened May 15.

== See also ==
- List of airports in Indiana
