= Ralph E. Koch Airport =

- IATA: none; ICAO: none; FAA LID: 61Y

Summary
- Airport type: Public use
- Owner: Ralph E. Koch
- Serves: Poseyville, Indiana
- Elevation AMSL: 450 ft / 137 m
- Coordinates: 38°12′27″N 087°46′28″W

Map
- Location of airport in Indiana

Runways
Direction	Length		Surface
Direction	ft	m	Surface
4/22	2,960	902	Turf
18U/36U	1,125	343	Turf

Statistics (2006)
- Aircraft operations: 840
- Based aircraft: 2
- Source: Federal Aviation Administration

Ralph E. Koch Airport (FAA LID: 61Y) is a public use airport in Gibson County, Indiana, United States. It is located two nautical miles (4 km) north of the central business district of Poseyville, a town in Posey County.

== Facilities and aircraft ==
Ralph E. Koch Airport covers an area of 81 acres (33 ha) at an elevation of 450 feet (137 m) above mean sea level. It has two runways with turf surfaces: 4/22 is 2,960 by 100 feet (902 x 30 m) and 18U/36U is 1,125 by 100 feet (343 x 30 m).

For the 12-month period ending December 31, 2006, the airport had 840 general aviation aircraft operations, an average of 70 per month. At that time there were two aircraft based at this airport, one single-engine and one ultralight.

== See also ==
- List of airports in Indiana
