= Wheeler Airport =

- IATA: none; ICAO: none; FAA LID: IG05

Summary
- Airport type: Private use
- Owner: James F. Wheeler
- Serves: Knox, Indiana
- Elevation AMSL: 720 ft / 219 m
- Coordinates: 41°11′23″N 086°36′25″W

Map
- Location of airport in Indiana

Runways
Direction	Length		Surface
Direction	ft	m	Surface
8/26	2,600	792	Turf

Statistics (1994)
- Aircraft operations: 7,284
- Based aircraft: 5
- Source: Federal Aviation Administration

Wheeler Airport (FAA LID: IG05, formerly 3C5) is a private use airport in Starke County, Indiana, United States. It is located six nautical miles (11 km) south of the central business district of Knox, Indiana, and was previously a public use airport.

== Facilities and aircraft ==
Wheeler Airport covers an area of 15 acres (6 ha) at an elevation of 720 feet (219 m) above mean sea level. It has one runway designated 8/26 with a turf surface measuring 2,600 by 200 feet (792 x 61 m).

For the 12-month period ending November 30, 1994, the airport had 7,284 aircraft operations, an average of 19 per day: 97% general aviation and 3% air taxi. At that time there were five aircraft based at this airport: four single-engine and one ultralight.

== See also ==
- List of airports in Indiana
