= Portland Municipal Airport (Indiana) =

- IATA: none; ICAO: KPLD; FAA LID: PLD

Summary
- Airport type: Public
- Owner: City of Portland
- Serves: Portland, Indiana
- Elevation AMSL: 925 ft / 282 m
- Coordinates: 40°27′06″N 084°59′20″W

Map
- Location of airport in Indiana PLD (the United States)

Runways
Direction	Length		Surface
Direction	ft	m	Surface
9/27	4,002	1,220	Asphalt

Statistics (2009)
- Aircraft operations: 7,737
- Based aircraft: 22
- Source: Federal Aviation Administration

Portland Municipal Airport (ICAO: KPLD, FAA LID: PLD) is a city-owned, public-use airport located one nautical mile (2 km) northwest of the central business district of Portland, a city in Jay County, Indiana, United States. It is included in the National Plan of Integrated Airport Systems for 2011–2015, which categorized it as a general aviation facility.

Although most U.S. airports use the same three-letter location identifier for the FAA and IATA, this airport is assigned PLD by the FAA but has no designation from the IATA (which assigned PLD to Playa Samara, Costa Rica).

== Facilities and aircraft ==
Portland Municipal Airport covers an area of 45 acres (18 ha) at an elevation of 925 feet (282 m) above mean sea level. It has one runway designated 9/27 with an asphalt surface measuring 4,002 by 75 feet (1,220 x 23 m).

For the 12-month period ending December 31, 2009, the airport had 7,737 aircraft operations, an average of 21 per day: 80% general aviation, 19% military, and 1% air taxi. At that time there were 22 aircraft based at this airport: 54.5% multi-engine and 45.5% single-engine.

== See also ==
- List of airports in Indiana
