= Warsaw Municipal Airport (Indiana) =

- IATA: none; ICAO: KASW; FAA LID: ASW

Summary
- Airport type: Public
- Owner: Warsaw Board of Aviation Commissioners
- Serves: Warsaw, Indiana
- Elevation AMSL: 850 ft (260 m)
- Coordinates: 41°16′29″N 085°50′24″W
- Website: www.warsaw.in.gov/92/Airport/

Map
- Location of airport in Indiana ASW (the United States)

Runways
Direction	Length		Surface
Direction	ft	m	Surface
9/27	6,001	1,829	Asphalt
18/36	4,021	1,226	Asphalt

Statistics
- Aircraft operations (2018): 13,373
- Based aircraft (2022): 41
- Source: Federal Aviation Administration

Warsaw Municipal Airport (ICAO: KASW, FAA LID: ASW) is a public use airport located two miles (3 km) north of the central business district of Warsaw, a city in Kosciusko County, Indiana, United States. It is owned by the Warsaw Board of Aviation Commissioners.

Although most U.S. airports use the same three-letter location identifier for the FAA and IATA, Warsaw Municipal Airport is assigned ASW by the FAA but has no designation from the IATA (which assigned ASW to Aswan International Airport in Aswan, Egypt).

== Facilities and aircraft ==
Warsaw Municipal Airport covers an area of 557 acres (225 ha) at an elevation of 850 feet (259 m) above mean sea level. The airport contains two asphalt paved runways: 9/27 measuring 6,001 by 100 ft (1,829 by 30 m) with approved ILS, GPS and VOR approaches and 18/36 measuring 4,021 by 75 ft (1,226 by 23 m).

For the 12-month period ending December 31, 2018, the airport had 13,373 aircraft operations, an average of 37 per day: 95% general aviation and 5% air taxi. In February 2022, there were 41 aircraft based at this airport: 37 single-engine, 1 multi-engine and 3 jet.

== See also ==
- List of airports in Indiana
