= Franklin Flying Field =

- IATA: none; ICAO: none; FAA LID: 3FK

Summary
- Airport type: Public use
- Owner: Siherb Aviation Corp
- Serves: Franklin, Indiana
- Elevation AMSL: 740 ft (230 m)
- Coordinates: 39°25′35″N 086°03′30″W

Map
- Location of airport in Indiana

Runways
Direction	Length		Surface
Direction	ft	m	Surface
3/21	2,400	732	Asphalt

Statistics
- Based aircraft: 43
- Source: Federal Aviation Administration

Franklin Flying Field (FAA LID: 3FK) is a privately owned, public use airport located three nautical miles (6 km) south of the central business district of Franklin, a city in Johnson County, Indiana, United States.

== Facilities and aircraft ==
Franklin Flying Field covers an area of 129 acres (52 ha) at an elevation of 740 feet (226 m) above mean sea level. It has one runway designated 3/21 with an asphalt surface measuring 2,400 by 35 feet (732 x 11 m).

There are 43 aircraft based at this airport: 95.3% single-engine, 2.3% multi-engine, and 2.3% helicopter.

== See also ==
- List of airports in Indiana
