= Global Pound Conference =

Conference series on international dispute resolution

The Global Pound Conference series (GPC) was a series of conferences about alternative dispute resolution (ADR) held in many cities in several countries in 2016/2017. The title of the conference series was "Shaping the Future of Dispute Resolution & Improving Access to Justice". It was organised as an initiative of the International Mediation Institute (IMI).

The series was inspired by Harvard law professor Roscoe Pound and a 1976 conference named for him, which was an impetus for the growth in the popularity of mediation in the USA.

The GPC series brought Global Pound Conferences to multiple locations around the world in 2016 and 2017, with the aim of raising awareness about the various dispute resolution methods available. It brought together users, providers and advisors to discuss the future direction of ADR. After ending, the GPC platform changed to become the Global Pound Conversation, a blog and research series covering changes and developments in mediation and alternative dispute resolution around the world.
