= Sky King Airport =

- IATA: none; ICAO: none; FAA LID: 3I3

Summary
- Airport type: Public
- Owner: Sky King Airport, Inc.
- Serves: Terre Haute, Indiana
- Elevation AMSL: 496 ft / 151 m
- Coordinates: 39°32′52″N 87°22′38″W

Maps
- Location of Vigo County in Indiana

- Location of airport in Vigo County

Runways
Direction	Length		Surface
Direction	ft	m	Surface
8/26	3,557	1,084	Asphalt
18/36	1,978	603	Asphalt

Statistics (2008)
- Aircraft operations: 23,015
- Based aircraft: 39
- Source: Federal Aviation Administration

Sky King Airport (FAA LID: 3I3) is a public use airport located five nautical miles (9 km) north of the central business district of Terre Haute, a city in Vigo County, Indiana, United States.

== Facilities and aircraft ==
Sky King Airport covers an area of 33 acres (13 ha) at an elevation of 496 feet (151 m) above mean sea level. It has two asphalt paved runways: 8/26 is 3,557 by 50 feet (1,084 x 15 m) and 18/36 is 1,978 by 50 feet (603 x 15 m).

For the 12-month period ending December 31, 2008, the airport had 23,015 aircraft operations, an average of 63 per day: 95% general aviation and 5% air taxi. At that time there were 39 aircraft based at this airport: 87% single-engine and 13% multi-engine.

== See also ==
- List of airports in Indiana
