= Daviess County Airport =

- IATA: none; ICAO: KDCY; FAA LID: DCY

Summary
- Airport type: Public
- Owner: Daviess County BOAC
- Serves: Washington, Indiana
- Elevation AMSL: 473 ft (144 m)
- Coordinates: 38°42′02″N 087°07′47″W

Map
- Location of airport in Indiana DCY (the United States)

Runways
Direction	Length		Surface
Direction	ft	m	Surface
18/36	4,615	1,407	Asphalt
9/27	2,650	808	Turf

Statistics
- Aircraft operations (2019): 2,803
- Based aircraft (2022): 30
- Source: Federal Aviation Administration

Daviess County Airport (ICAO: KDCY, FAA LID: DCY) is a county-owned public-use airport located three nautical miles (6 km) northeast of the central business district of Washington, a city in Daviess County, Indiana, United States.

Although most U.S. airports use the same three-letter location identifier for the FAA and IATA, this airport is assigned DCY by the FAA but has no designation from the IATA.

== Facilities and aircraft ==
Daviess County Airport covers an area of 130 acres (53 ha) at an elevation of 473 feet (144 m) above mean sea level. It has two runways; one asphalt paved runway designated 18/36 which measures 4,615 by 75 feet (1,407 x 23 m) and one turf runway designated 9/27 which measures 2,650 by 150 feet (808 x 46 m).

For the 12-month period ending December 31, 2019, the airport had 2,803 aircraft operations, an average of 8 per day: 99% general aviation and less than 1% air taxi. In January 2022, there were 30 aircraft based at this airport: 26 single-engine, 3 multi-engine and 1 jet.

== See also ==
- List of airports in Indiana
