= Huntington Municipal Airport (Indiana) =

Airport in Indiana, US

- IATA: none; ICAO: KHHG; FAA LID: HHG

Summary
- Airport type: Public
- Owner: Huntington BOAC
- Serves: Huntington, Indiana
- Elevation AMSL: 806 ft (246 m)
- Coordinates: 40°51′11″N 085°27′25″W

Map
- Location of airport in Indiana HHG (the United States)

Runways
Direction	Length		Surface
Direction	ft	m	Surface
9/27	5,001	1,524	Asphalt

Statistics (2004)
- Aircraft operations: 17,139
- Based aircraft: 67
- Source: Federal Aviation Administration

Huntington Municipal Airport (ICAO: KHHG, FAA LID: HHG) is a city-owned, public-use airport located three nautical miles (6 km) southeast of the central business district of Huntington, a city in Huntington County, Indiana, United States. According to the FAA's National Plan of Integrated Airport Systems for 2009–2013, it was classified as a general aviation airport.

Although most U.S. airports use the same three-letter location identifier for the FAA and IATA, this airport is assigned HHG by the FAA but has no designation from the IATA.

== Facilities and aircraft ==
Huntington Municipal Airport covers an area of 118 acres (48 ha) at an elevation of 806 feet (246 m) above mean sea level. It has one runway designated 9/27 with an asphalt surface measuring 5,001 by 75 feet (1,524 x 23 m).

For the 12-month period ending December 31, 2004, the airport had 17,139 aircraft operations, an average of 46 per day: 99% general aviation and 1% air taxi. At that time there were 67 aircraft based at this airport: 88% single-engine and 12% multi-engine.

== See also ==
- List of airports in Indiana
