= White County Airport =

Airport in Indiana, United States

- IATA: none; ICAO: KMCX; FAA LID: MCX

Summary
- Airport type: Public
- Owner: White County BOAC
- Serves: Monticello, Indiana
- Elevation AMSL: 676 ft (206 m)
- Coordinates: 40°42′32″N 086°46′00″W

Map
- Location of airport in Indiana MCX (the United States)

Runways
Direction	Length		Surface
Direction	ft	m	Surface
18/36	4,002	1,220	Asphalt

Statistics (2011)
- Aircraft operations: 15,180
- Based aircraft: 22
- Source: Federal Aviation Administration

White County Airport (ICAO: KMCX, FAA LID: MCX) is a public use airport in White County, Indiana, United States. It is owned by the White County Board of Aviation Commissioners and located three nautical miles (6 km) south of the central business district of Monticello, Indiana. This airport is included in the National Plan of Integrated Airport Systems for 2011–2015, which categorized it as a general aviation facility.

Although many U.S. airports use the same three-letter location identifier for the FAA and IATA, this airport is assigned MCX by the FAA but has no designation from the IATA (which assigned MCX to Uytash Airport in Makhachkala, Russia).

== Facilities and aircraft ==
White County Airport covers an area of 51 acres (21 ha) at an elevation of 676 feet (206 m) above mean sea level. It has one runway designated 18/36 with an asphalt surface measuring 4,002 by 75 feet (1,220 x 23 m).

For the 12-month period ending December 31, 2011, the airport had 15,180 aircraft operations, an average of 41 per day: 87% general aviation and 13% air taxi. At that time there were 22 aircraft based at this airport: 77% single-engine, 9% multi-engine, 9% glider, and 5% helicopter.

== See also ==
- List of airports in Indiana
