= Scottsburg Airport =

- IATA: none; ICAO: none; FAA LID: 3R8

Summary
- Airport type: Public
- Owner: Indiana Aviation Ventures
- Serves: Scottsburg, Indiana
- Elevation AMSL: 600 ft / 180 m
- Coordinates: 38°39′27″N 085°47′26″W
- Interactive map of Scottsburg Airport

Runways
Direction	Length		Surface
Direction	ft	m	Surface
2/20	2,750	838	Asphalt
- Source: Federal Aviation Administration

Scottsburg Airport, (FAA LID: 3R8) also known as Honaker Field Airport, is a public-use airport located 3 mi (4.8 km) from the town of Scottsburg, Indiana. It is located near Interstate 65.

== Facilities ==
The airport is located at an elevation of 600 ft (180 m). It has one runway: 2/20, which is 2750 x 100 ft. (838 x 30 m). The airport has no control tower.

== Accidents and incidents ==
- On August 1, 2023, a homemade plane crashed at Scottsburg Airport, leading the pilot, the plane's sole occupant, to be hospitalized.
