= La Porte Municipal Airport (Indiana) =

Coordinates: 41°34′21″N 086°44′04″W

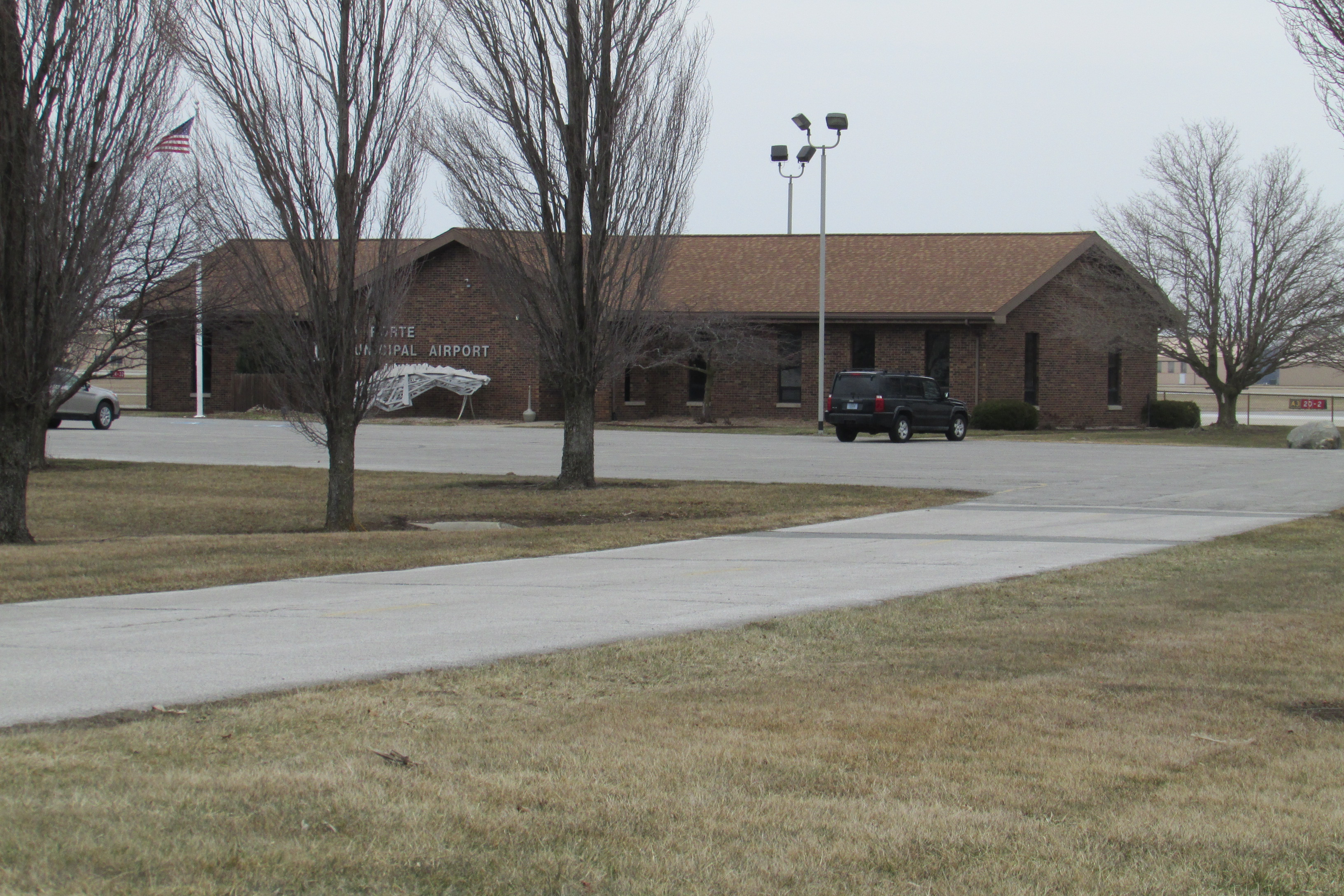
- Terminal

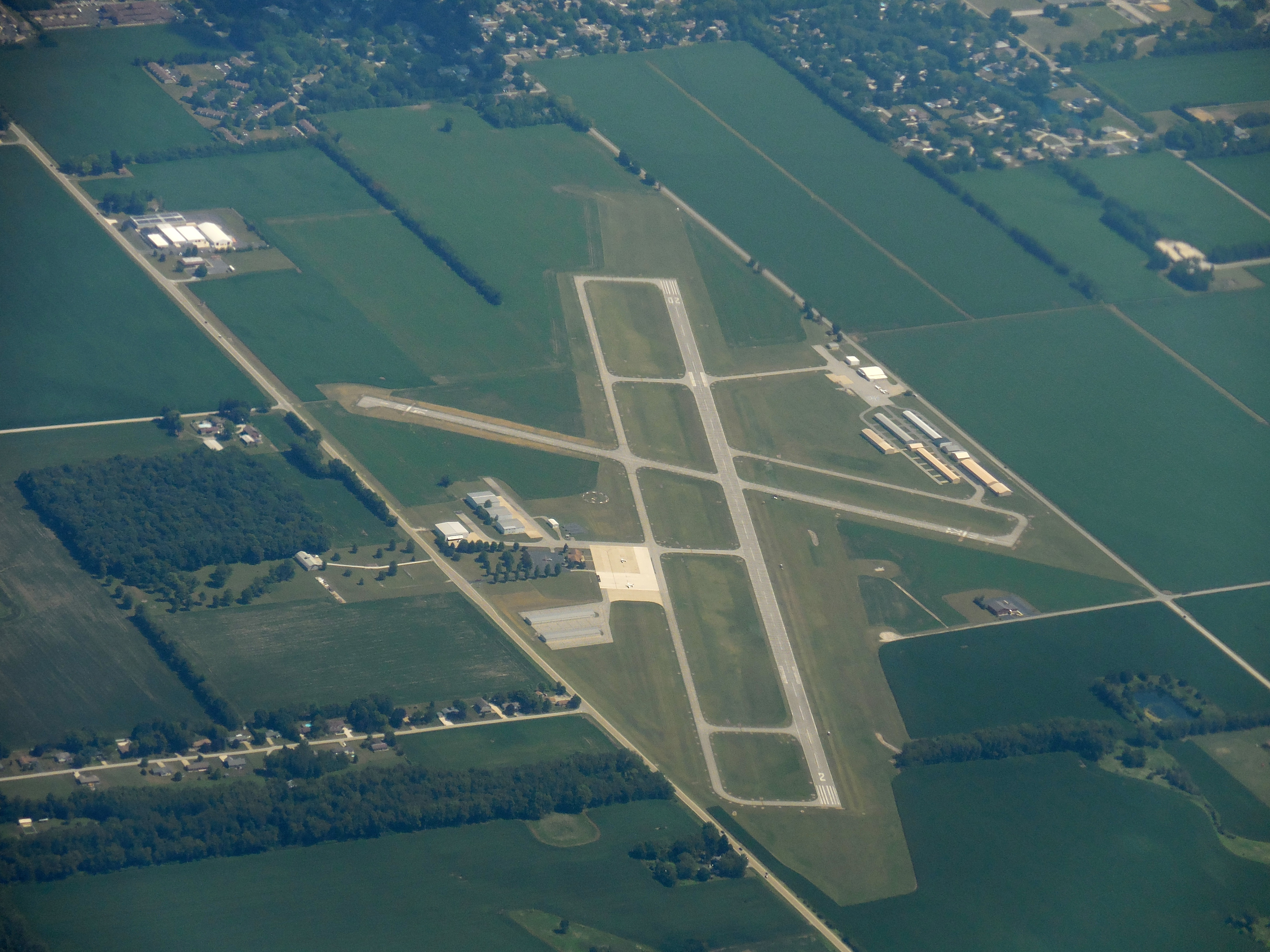
- Aerial view
- IATA: LPO; ICAO: KPPO; FAA LID: PPO

Summary
- Airport type: Public
- Owner: La Porte Airport Authority
- Serves: La Porte, Indiana
- Opened: April 1940
- Elevation AMSL: 812 ft / 247 m

Map
- Location of airport in Indiana PPO (the United States)

Runways
Direction	Length		Surface
Direction	ft	m	Surface
2/20	5,000	1,524	Asphalt
14/32	2,800	853	Asphalt

Statistics (2005)
- Aircraft operations: 15,416
- Based aircraft: 78
- Source: Federal Aviation Administration

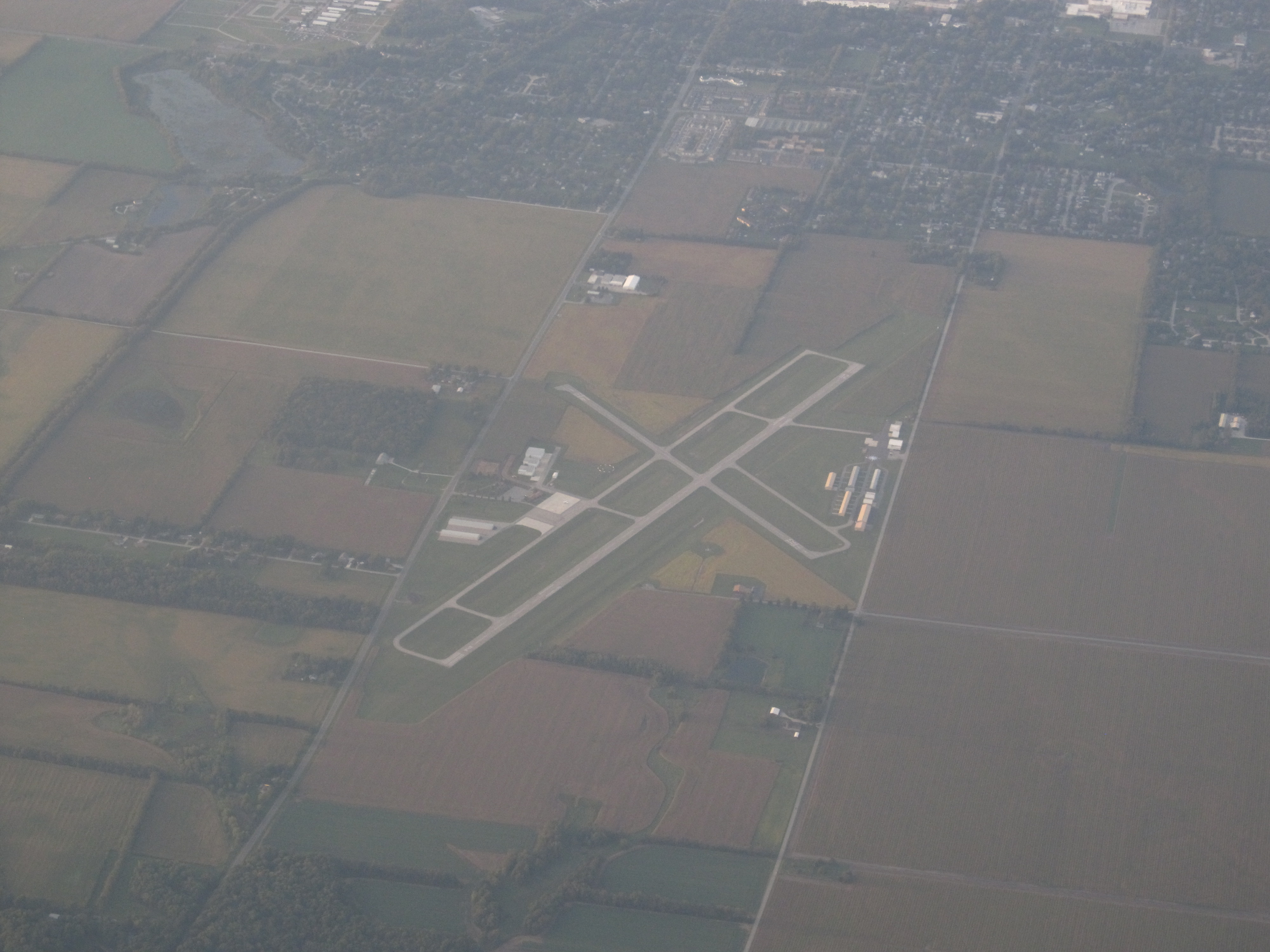
La Porte Municipal Airport

La Porte Municipal Airport (IATA: LPO, ICAO: KPPO, FAA LID: PPO) is a city-owned public-use airport located three miles (5 km) south of the central business district of La Porte, a city in La Porte County, Indiana, United States.

Although most U.S. airports use the same three-letter location identifier for the FAA and IATA, La Porte Municipal Airport is assigned PPO by the FAA and LPO by the IATA. The airport's ICAO identifier is KPPO.

== Facilities and aircraft ==
La Porte Municipal Airport covers an area of 188 acres (76 ha) which contains two asphalt paved runways: 2/20 at 5,000 x 75 ft (1,524 x 23 m) and 14/32 measuring 2,800 x 60 ft (853 x 18 m).

For the 12-month period ending December 31, 2005, the airport had 15,416 aircraft operations, an average of 42 per day: 99.7% general aviation and 0.3% air taxi. There are 78 aircraft based at this airport: 91% single-engine, 5% multi-engine and 4% jet.

== See also ==
- List of airports in Indiana
