= General People's Congress =

General People's Congress may refer to:

- General People's Congress (Yemen), political party in Yemen
- General People's Congress (Libya), a former legislative body of the Great Socialist People's Libyan Arab Jamahiriya
