= Global Plant Clinic =

International agricultural organization

- Website: Global Plant Clinic Homepage

The Global Plant Clinic (GPC) is managed by CABI in alliance with Rothamsted Research and FERA Science. The GPC provides plant health services and supports over 80 plant health clinics in Africa, Asia and Latin America. The clinic has a diagnostic service, which covers all plants and types of problems, is used by over 80 countries and helps maintain disease vigilance. The clinic also trains plant pathologists, and work with all sectors to improve regular and reliable access to technical support and advice. The clinics main aim is to create durable plant health services for those who need them most by improving access to technical support and advice.

== Origins ==
Identifying plant pathogens was one of the original aims of the Imperial Bureau of Mycology which eventually became part of the Commonwealth Agricultural Bureaux (CAB) that included scientists with special skills in mycology, entomology, nematodes and later bacteria. The Commonwealth Agricultural Bureaux was later renamed CAB International in 1992.

CABI works predominantly in and with developing countries. In the 1980s, the then Overseas Development Administration (now the Department for International Development) began funding a diagnostic and advisory service for plant diseases. Jim Waller, Ian Gibson, Dick Pawsey and others became plant pathology 'liaison officers', investigating major problems such as Sumatra Disease of Cloves in Indonesia and providing technical support to many plant pathology disease projects that were funded by the UK government.

When DFID was created by the Labour Government in 1997 this also signalled a major change in development policies. The diagnostic and advisory service changed its name in 2002 to the Global Plant Clinic and itself undertook a major change in terms of priorities and activities. The core diagnostic services for fungal, bacterial and nematode diseases were maintained and widened to include viruses and phytoplasmas. Phil Jones, based at Rothamsted Research, had been jointly funded with IMI to provide such services from the 1990s but it was not until 2005 that Rothamsted Research and Fera Science (Central Science Laboratory at the time) were both formally incorporated in the GPC alliance.

== Plant Health Services ==
The GPC created several plant health clinics that could be run independently by organisations in-country. The first country to try these out was Bolivia, pioneered by CIAT Bolivia and Proinpa, soon followed by Uganda and then Bangladesh. The early experiences led to interest from Nicaragua, which now has the largest and most extensive network of clinics (called Puestos para Plantas) linked to a revitalised network for diagnostics and plant health management. Other countries which have adopted plant health clinics include Sierra Leone, Democratic Republic of the Congo, Rwanda, India and Vietnam. The GPC has carried out pilot clinics in Peru and Indonesia.
