= Fulton County Airport (Indiana) =

- IATA: RCR; ICAO: KRCR; FAA LID: RCR

Summary
- Airport type: Public
- Owner: Fulton County Airport Authority
- Location: Rochester, Indiana
- Elevation AMSL: 790 ft (240 m)
- Coordinates: 41°03′56″N 086°10′54″W

Map
- Location of airport in Indiana RCR (the United States)

Runways
Direction	Length		Surface
Direction	ft	m	Surface
11/29	5,001	1,524	Asphalt

Statistics (2019)
- Aircraft operations: 13,382
- Based aircraft: 10
- Source: Federal Aviation Administration

Fulton County Airport (IATA: RCR, ICAO: KRCR, FAA LID: RCR) is two miles east of Rochester, in Fulton County, Indiana. It is owned by the Fulton County Airport Authority (formerly the Fulton County Board of Aviation Commissioners).

== Facilities ==
Fulton County Airport covers 213 acres (86 ha) at an elevation of 790 feet (241 m). Its runway, 11/29, is 5,001 by 75 feet (1,524 x 23 m) asphalt.

In the year ending December 31, 2019, the airport had 13,382 aircraft operations, average 37 per day: all general aviation. Ten aircraft were then based at this airport: 9 single-engine and 1 helicopter.

== See also ==
- List of airports in Indiana
