= Lake Village Airport =

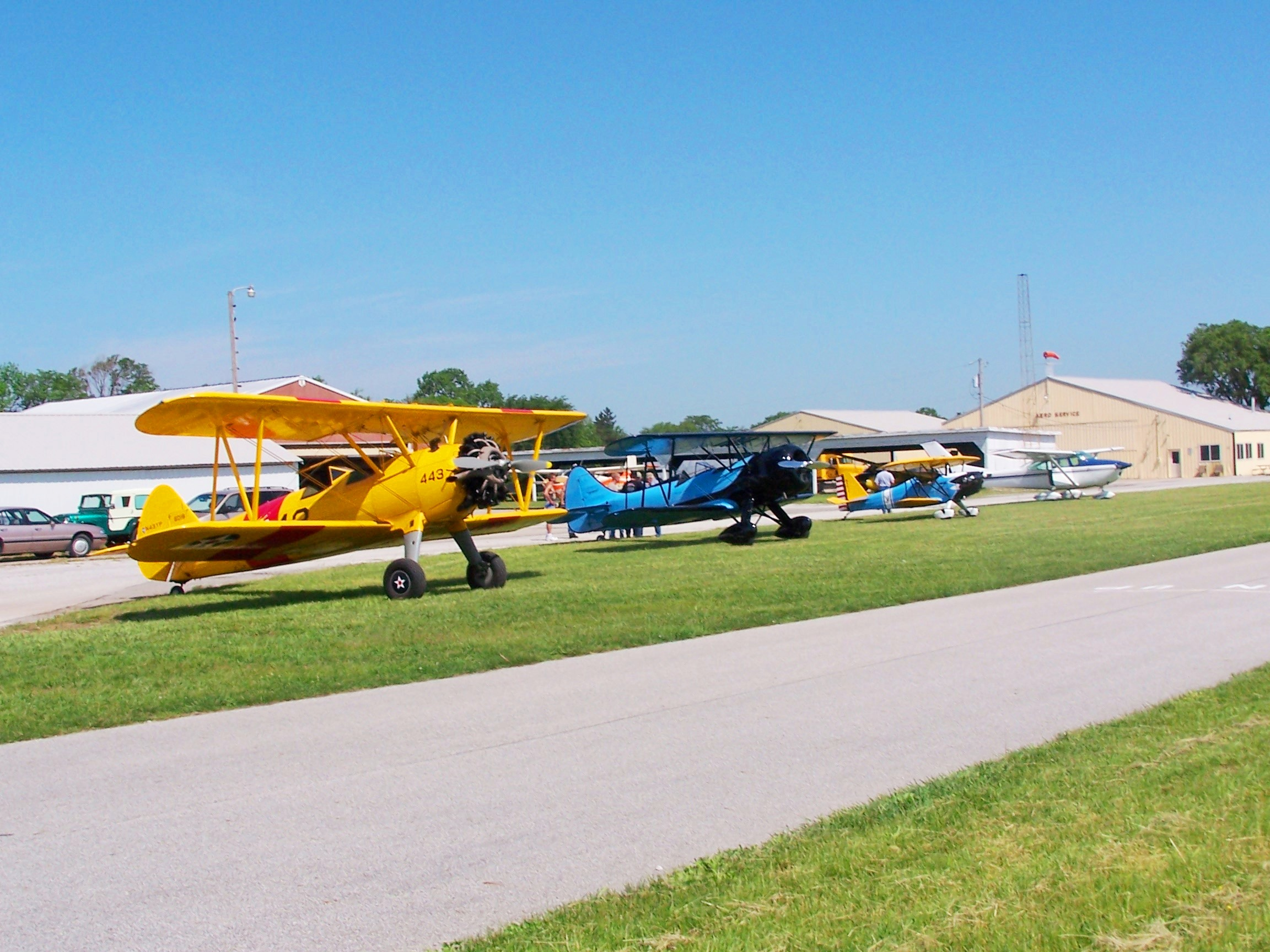
- Lake Village Airport
- IATA: none; ICAO: none; FAA LID: C98

Summary
- Airport type: Public
- Owner: Michael Steinle
- Location: Lake Village, Indiana
- Elevation AMSL: 644 ft / 196 m
- Coordinates: 41°09′00″N 087°27′45″W
- Website: www.lakevillageairport.com
- Interactive map of Lake Village Airport

Runways
Direction	Length		Surface
Direction	ft	m	Surface
18/36	2,500	762	Turf and Asphalt
- Source: Federal Aviation Administration and Michael Steinle

Lake Village Airport (FAA LID: C98) is a public-use airport located one mile (1.6 km) northwest of the central business district of Lake Village, in Newton County, Indiana, United States. The CTAF for the Airport is 122.9. This airport is privately owned by Michael Steinle.

== Facilities ==
Lake Village Airport covers an area of 27 acres (11 ha) which contains one runway:

- Runway 18/36: 2,500 x 140 ft (762 x 43 m), Surface: Turf
- Runway 18/36 is a 90' wide grass strip paralleled by a 38' wide asphalt surface.
- Runway 18/36 has pilot controlled runway lights and can be turned on using the CTAF 122.9
- There is a 1000' overrun on the north end of the runway that clears all trees on the approach and departure path. The first 500' of the overrun to the north of the runway is level enough to land or roll out on in the event of an emergency.

The Lake Village Aero Service FBO is a shop that does annual aircraft inspections and fabric recovery, as well as major repairs to airframe and powerplant.

== See also ==
- List of airports in Indiana
