= Tri-State Steuben County Airport =

- IATA: ANQ; ICAO: KANQ; FAA LID: ANQ

Summary
- Airport type: Public
- Owner: Steuben County Board of Aviation Commissioners
- Serves: Angola, Indiana
- Elevation AMSL: 995 ft / 303 m
- Coordinates: 41°38′23″N 085°05′01″W

Map
- Location of airport in Indiana/United States ANQ (the United States)

Runways
| Direction | Length | | Surface |
| Direction | ft | m | Surface |
|---|---|---|---|
| 5/23 | 4,540 | 1,384 | Asphalt |

Statistics (2010)
- Aircraft operations: 19,475
- Based aircraft: 40
- Source: Federal Aviation Administration

Tri-State Steuben County Airport (IATA: ANQ, ICAO: KANQ, FAA LID: ANQ) is a public use airport in Steuben County, Indiana, United States. Owned by the Steuben County Board of Aviation Commissioners, it is located three nautical miles (6 km) west of the central business district of Angola, Indiana. The airport is included in the National Plan of Integrated Airport Systems for 2011–15, which categorized it as a general aviation facility.

== Facilities and aircraft ==
Tri-State Steuben County Airport covers an area of 392 acres (159 ha) at an elevation of 995 feet (303 m) above mean sea level. It has one runway designated 5/23 with an asphalt surface measuring 4,540 by 75 feet (1,384 x 23 m).

For the 12-month period ending December 31, 2010, the airport had 19,475 aircraft operations, an average of 53 per day: 93% general aviation and 7% air taxi. At that time there were 40 aircraft based at this airport: 90% single-engine and 10% multi-engine.

== See also ==
- List of airports in Indiana
