= Westfield Airport =

- IATA: none; ICAO: none; FAA LID: I72

Summary
- Airport type: Public
- Owner: Leslie Wheeler
- Serves: Westfield, Indiana
- Elevation AMSL: 932 ft / 284 m
- Coordinates: 40°02′56″N 086°09′28″W
- Interactive map of Westfield Airport

Runways
Direction	Length		Surface
Direction	ft	m	Surface
18/36	3,000	914	Turf

Statistics (2006)
- Aircraft operations: 8,075
- Based aircraft: 17
- Source: Federal Aviation Administration

Westfield Airport (FAA LID: I72) is a public use airport located two nautical miles (4 km) west of the central business district of Westfield, a city in Hamilton County, Indiana, United States. It is privately owned by Leslie Wheeler.

The Indy Flyers Light Aircraft Association holds meetings at this airport on the second Wednesday of each month.

== Facilities and aircraft ==
Westfield Airport covers an area of 115 acres (47 ha) at an elevation of 932 feet (284 m) above mean sea level. It has one runway designated 18/36 with a turf surface measuring 3,000 by 100 feet (914 x 30 m). For the 12-month period ending December 31, 2006, the airport had 8,075 general aviation aircraft operations, an average of 22 per day. At that time there were 17 aircraft based at this airport: 59% ultralight and 41% single-engine.

== See also ==
- List of airports in Indiana
