= French Lick Municipal Airport =

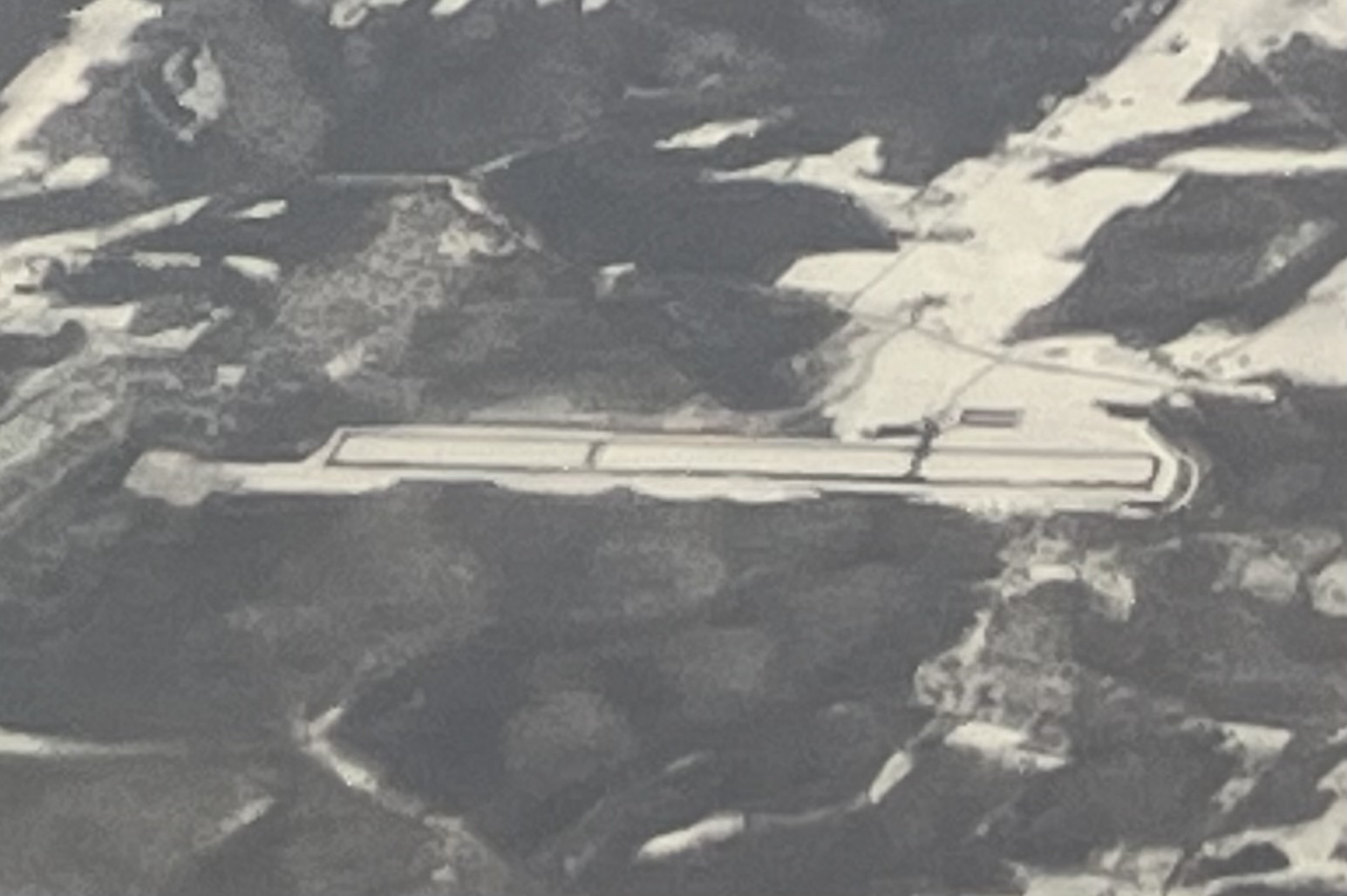
- IATA: FRH; ICAO: KFRH; FAA LID: FRH

Summary
- Airport type: Public
- Owner: French Lick Board of Aviation Commissioners
- Serves: French Lick, Indiana
- Location: French Lick, Indiana
- Elevation AMSL: 792 ft (241 m)
- Coordinates: 38°30′22″N 086°38′13″W
- Website: FrenchLickAirport.com

Map
- Location of airport in Indiana FRH (the United States)

Runways
Direction	Length		Surface
Direction	ft	m	Surface
8/26	5,500	1,676	Asphalt

Statistics (2007)
- Aircraft operations: 8,795
- Based aircraft: 18
- Source: Federal Aviation Administration

French Lick Municipal Airport (IATA: FRH, ICAO: KFRH, FAA LID: FRH) is a city-owned public-use airport located three nautical miles (6 km) southwest of the central business district of French Lick, a town in Orange County, Indiana, United States. Also known as French Lick Airport, it serves the French Lick and West Baden, Indiana area.

== Facilities and aircraft ==
French Lick Municipal Airport covers an area of 422 acres (171 ha) at an elevation of 792 feet (241 m) above mean sea level. It has one asphalt paved runway designated 8/26 which measures 5,500 by 100 feet (1,676 x 30 m).

For the 12-month period ending December 31, 2007, the airport had 8,795 aircraft operations, an average of 24 per day: 94% general aviation, 5% air taxi and 1% military. At that time there were 18 aircraft based at this airport: 61% single-engine and 39% ultralight.

== See also ==
- List of airports in Indiana
