= Putnam County Airport =

Airport in Putnam County, Indiana, United States

Putnam County Regional Airport
- IATA: none; ICAO: KGPC; FAA LID: GPC

Summary
- Airport type: Public
- Owner: Putnam County Airport Authority
- Operator: PDM Aviation LLC
- Location: Greencastle, Indiana
- Elevation AMSL: 842 ft / 256.6 m
- Coordinates: 39°37′56″N 86°48′50″W

Map
- Location of airport in Indiana / United States GPC (the United States)

Runways
Direction	Length		Surface
Direction	ft	m	Surface
18/36	5,002	1,525	Asphalt

Statistics
- Aircraft operations (2013): 7,309
- Based aircraft (2017): 34
- Source: Federal Aviation Administration

Putnam County Airport (GPC), (formerly 4I7), is a public airport 3 miles (4.8 km) southeast of Greencastle, in Putnam County, Indiana, United States. The airport was founded in January 1947. It is included in the Federal Aviation Administration (FAA) National Plan of Integrated Airport Systems for 2017–2021, in which it is categorized as a local general aviation facility.

== Facilities and aircraft ==
Putnam County Regional Aviation Airport covers an area of 192 acres (78 ha) at an elevation of 842 feet (257 m) above mean sea level. It has one runway: 18/36 is a 5,002 by 100 feet (1,525 X 30 m) asphalt runway with approved GPS.

For the 12-month period ending December 31, 2013, the airport had 7,309 aircraft operations, an average of 20 per day: 99% general aviation and 1% air taxi. In January 2017, there were 34 aircraft based at this airport: 16 single-engine, 5 multi-engine, 8 helicopters and 5 ultralights. Putnam County Regional Airport is also a crew base and maintenance facility for St. Vincent Stat Flight medical helicopters operated by PHI Air Medical and is the home of EAA Chapter 1374.

== See also ==
- List of airports in Indiana
