= Kendallville Municipal Airport =

- IATA: none; ICAO: none; FAA LID: C62

Summary
- Airport type: Public
- Owner: Kendallville BOAC
- Location: Kendallville, Indiana
- Elevation AMSL: 1,004 ft / 306 m
- Coordinates: 41°28′22″N 85°15′41″W

Map
- Location of airport in Indiana C62 (the United States)

Runways
Direction	Length		Surface
Direction	ft	m	Surface
10/28	4,399	1,341	Asphalt

Kendallville Municipal Airport (C62) is a public airport 2 miles (3.2 km) north of Kendallville, in Noble County, Indiana. The airport was founded in November 1946.

== See also ==
- List of airports in Indiana
