= Arens Field =

Coordinates: 41.093417°N 86.604888°W

Arens Field Airport
- IATA: none; ICAO: KRWN; FAA LID: RWN

Summary
- Airport type: Public
- Owner: Winamac- Pulaski County BOAC
- Location: Winamac, Indiana
- Opened: August 1969
- Elevation AMSL: 708 ft (216 m)

Map
- Location of airport in Indiana RWN (the United States)

Runways
Direction	Length		Surface
Direction	ft	m	Surface
9/27	4,201	1,280	Asphalt

Arens Field Airport (ICAO: KRWN, FAA LID: RWN) is a public airport 3 miles (4.8 km) north of Winamac, in Pulaski County, Indiana. The airport was founded in August 1969.

== See also ==
- List of airports in Indiana
