= Elwood Airport =

- IATA: none; ICAO: none; FAA LID: 3I1

Summary
- Airport type: Public
- Owner: Ann Brewer
- Serves: Elwood, Indiana
- Elevation AMSL: 866 ft (264 m)
- Coordinates: 40°15′10.1″N 085°49′59.9″W
- Interactive map of Elwood Airport

Runways
Direction	Length		Surface
Direction	ft	m	Surface
9/27	2,243	684	Turf
18/36	2,076	633	Turf

Statistics (2005)
- Aircraft operations: 2,604
- Source: Federal Aviation Administration

Elwood Airport (FAA LID: 3I1) was a public use airport located two nautical miles (3.7 km) south of the central business district of Elwood, in Madison County, Indiana, United States. The airfield closed on September 1, 2008.

== Facilities and aircraft ==
Elwood Airport covers an area of 74 acres (30 ha) at an elevation of 866 feet (264 m) above mean sea level. It has two runways with turf surfaces: 9/27 measures 2,243 by 300 feet (684 x 91 m) and 18/36 is 2,076 by 300 feet (633 x 91 m). For the 12-month period ending August 23, 2005, the airport had 2,604 general aviation aircraft operations, an average of 217 per month.
