= Monroe County Airport (Indiana) =

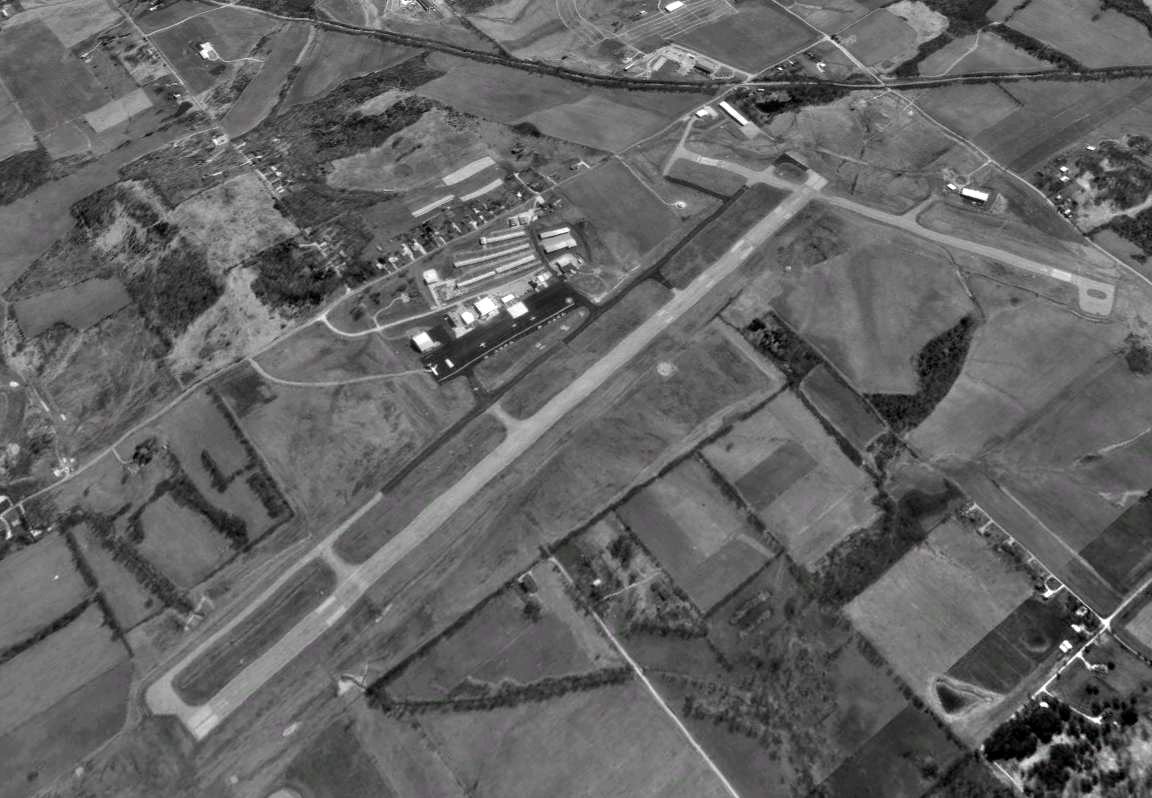
- IATA: BMG; ICAO: KBMG; FAA LID: BMG

Summary
- Airport type: Public
- Owner: Monroe County
- Location: Bloomington, Indiana
- Elevation AMSL: 846 ft / 258 m
- Coordinates: 39°08′46″N 086°37′00″W
- Website: https://flymonroecounty.com/
- Interactive map of Monroe County Airport

Runways
Direction	Length		Surface
Direction	ft	m	Surface
17/35	6,500	1,981	Asphalt
6/24	3,798	1,158	Asphalt

Statistics (2021)
- Aircraft operations: 29,376
- Based aircraft: 84
- Source: Federal Aviation Administration

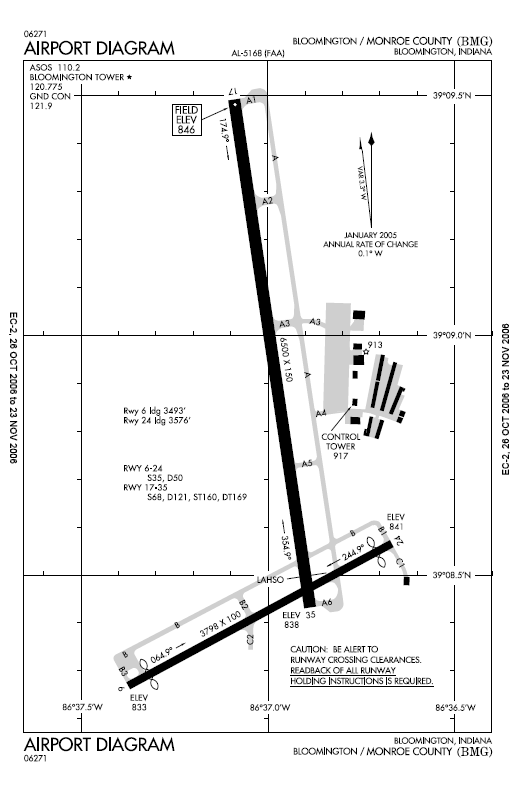
FAA diagram of Monroe County Airport (BMG)

Monroe County Airport (IATA: BMG, ICAO: KBMG, FAA LID: BMG) is a county-owned public-use airport located four nautical miles (7 km) southwest of the central business district of Bloomington, a city in Monroe County, Indiana, United States. Commercial service has been available at different points in the airport's history but as of April 2026, no scheduled service is available.

== Facilities and aircraft ==
Monroe County Airport covers an area of 1,035 acres (419 ha) at an elevation of 845 feet (258 m) above mean sea level. It has two asphalt paved runways: 17/35 is 6,500 by 150 feet (1,981 x 46 m) and 6/24 is 3,798 by 100 feet (1,158 x 30 m).

In 2022, Monroe County Airport experienced 29,484 flight operations, or an average of 81 flights daily. Of these, 1,325 were conducted by air carriers or air taxis. As of 2023, the airport is home to 108 aircraft, comprising 91 single-engine and 10 multi-engine airplanes, six jets, and one helicopter. Additionally, the airport serves as a base for over ten hot air balloons.

As constructed, the original runway was 5,200 feet (1,585 m) but was later lengthened to 6,500 feet (1,981 m), permitting the operation of Boeing 727 aircraft. In 1995, the aircraft parking ramp was wholly replaced, allowing for the handling of larger planes. 13 hangars were added at this time as well. Fixed Base Operator (FBO) services and car rentals are available. There are two FBOs at the airport: Cook Aviation (owned by Cook Group) and BMG Aviation.

Commercial carriers offered scheduled service to and from Monroe County Airport until the late 1990s. Operations at Monroe County Airport received federal funding under the Essential Air Service program until 1997, when these subsidies were cut due to the airport's proximity to Indianapolis International Airport. After the loss of these subsidies, it was no longer economically viable for commercial carriers to operate at Monroe County Airport.

== Accidents and incidents ==
- On 19 October 1985, Vickers Viscount N923RC of Ray Charles Enterprises was damaged beyond economic repair when it departed the runway on landing.
- On 21 April 2006, at about 23:45, a Cessna 206 N120HS was destroyed on impact while on an instrument approach to runway 35. The flight originated from the Purdue University Airport (LAF), near Lafayette, Indiana, about 2245. The pilot and four passengers all sustained fatal injures in the accident. All five people killed in the accident were Indiana University music students. The 2020 documentary "Invisible Sky" is based on this accident.
- On 17 December 2021, a Piper PA-32 N5677V crashed 3 miles south of the airport, killing the pilot.

== See also ==
- List of airports in Indiana
