= Miller Airport (Indiana) =

- IATA: none; ICAO: none; FAA LID: C40

Summary
- Airport type: Public
- Owner: John W. Miller
- Serves: Bluffton, Indiana
- Elevation AMSL: 845 ft / 258 m
- Coordinates: 40°42′52″N 85°14′56″W
- Interactive map of Miller Airport

Runways
| Direction | Length | | Surface |
| Direction | ft | m | Surface |
|---|---|---|---|
| 9/27 | 2,600 | 792 | Turf |
| 18/36 | 2,230 | 680 | Turf |

Statistics (2006)
- Aircraft operations: 2,616
- Source: Federal Aviation Administration

Miller Airport (FAA LID: C40) is a privately owned, public-use airport located three nautical miles (6 km) southwest of the central business district of Bluffton, in Wells County, Indiana, United States.

== Facilities and aircraft ==
Miller Airport covers an area of 80 acres (32 ha) at an elevation of 845 feet (258 m) above mean sea level. It has two runways with turf surfaces: 9/27 is 2,600 by 100 feet (792 × 30 m) and 18/36 is 2,230 by 100 feet (680 × 30 m). For the 12-month period ending December 31, 2006, the airport had 2,616 general aviation aircraft operations, an average of 218 per month.

== See also ==
- List of airports in Indiana
