= Kokomo Municipal Airport =

Airport in Indiana, United States

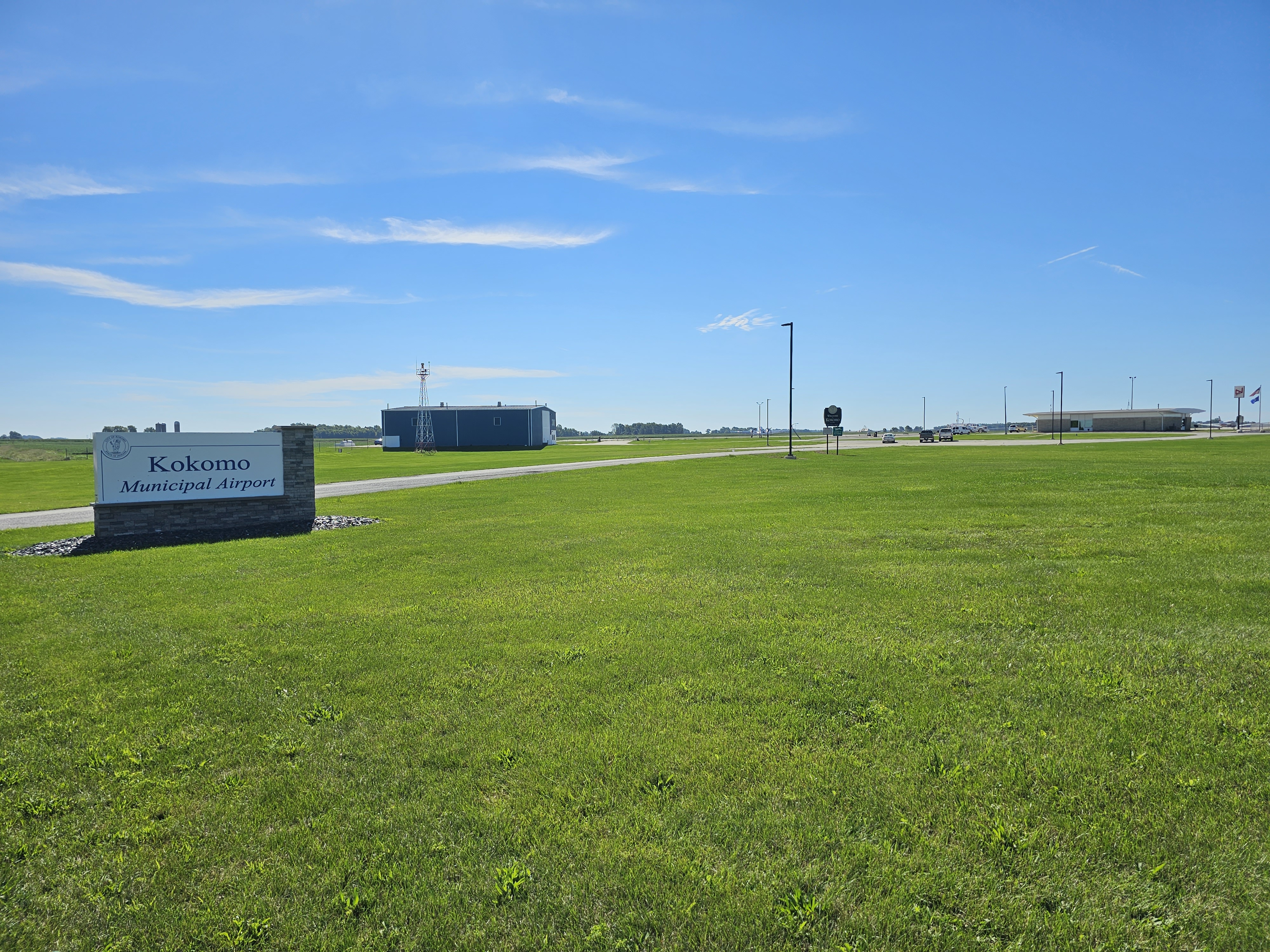
- IATA: OKK; ICAO: KOKK; FAA LID: OKK

Summary
- Airport type: Public
- Owner: Kokomo BOAC
- Serves: Kokomo, Indiana
- Elevation AMSL: 830 ft (250 m)
- Coordinates: 40°31′41″N 086°03′32″W
- Website: Kokomo Municipal Airport

Map
- Location within Indiana Location within the United States

Runways
Direction	Length		Surface
Direction	ft	m	Surface
5/23	6,001	1,829	Asphalt
14/32	4,002	1,220	Asphalt

Statistics (2014)
- Aircraft operations: 17,043
- Based aircraft: 50
- Source: Federal Aviation Administration

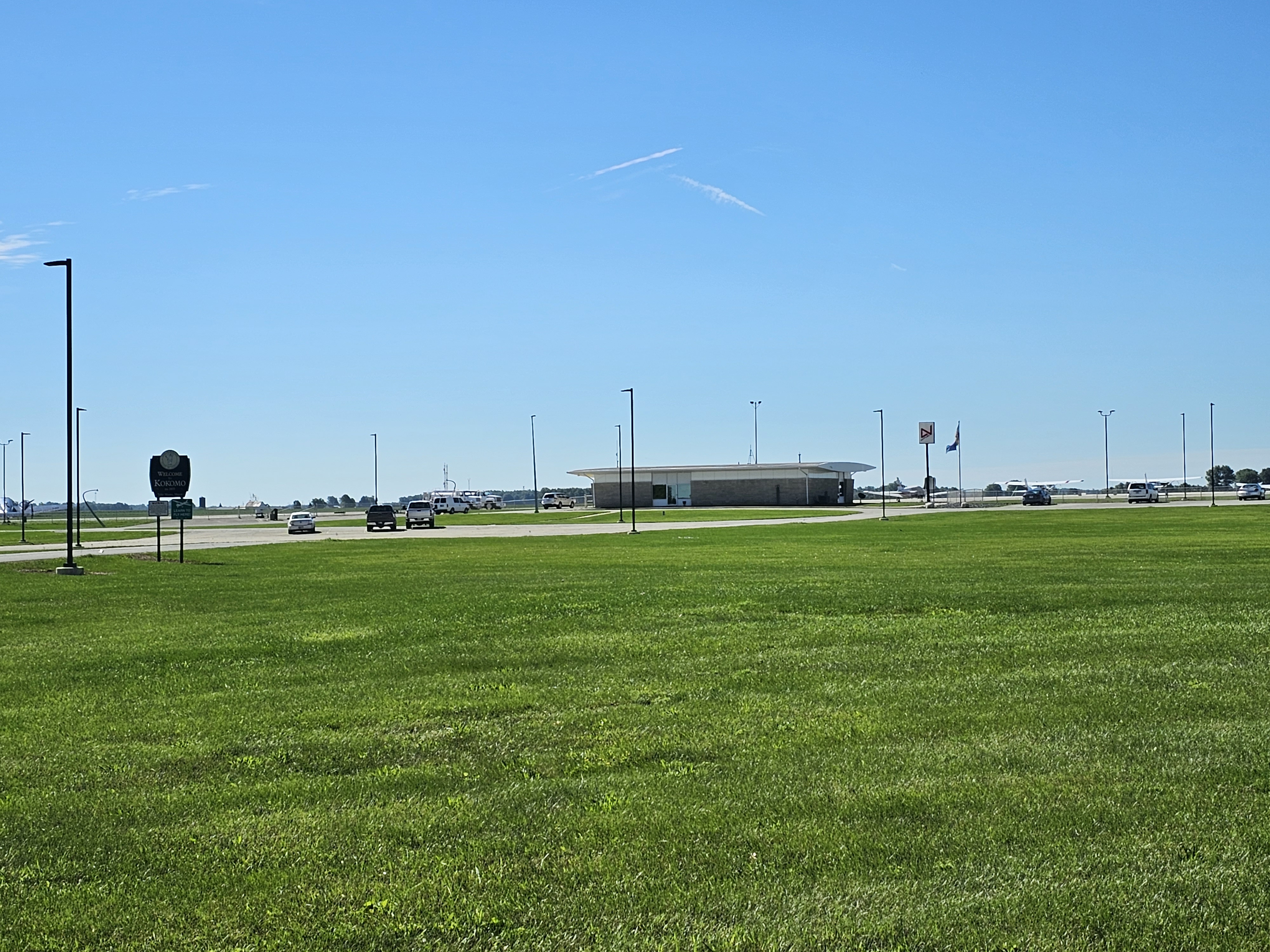
Terminal of Kokomo municipal airport

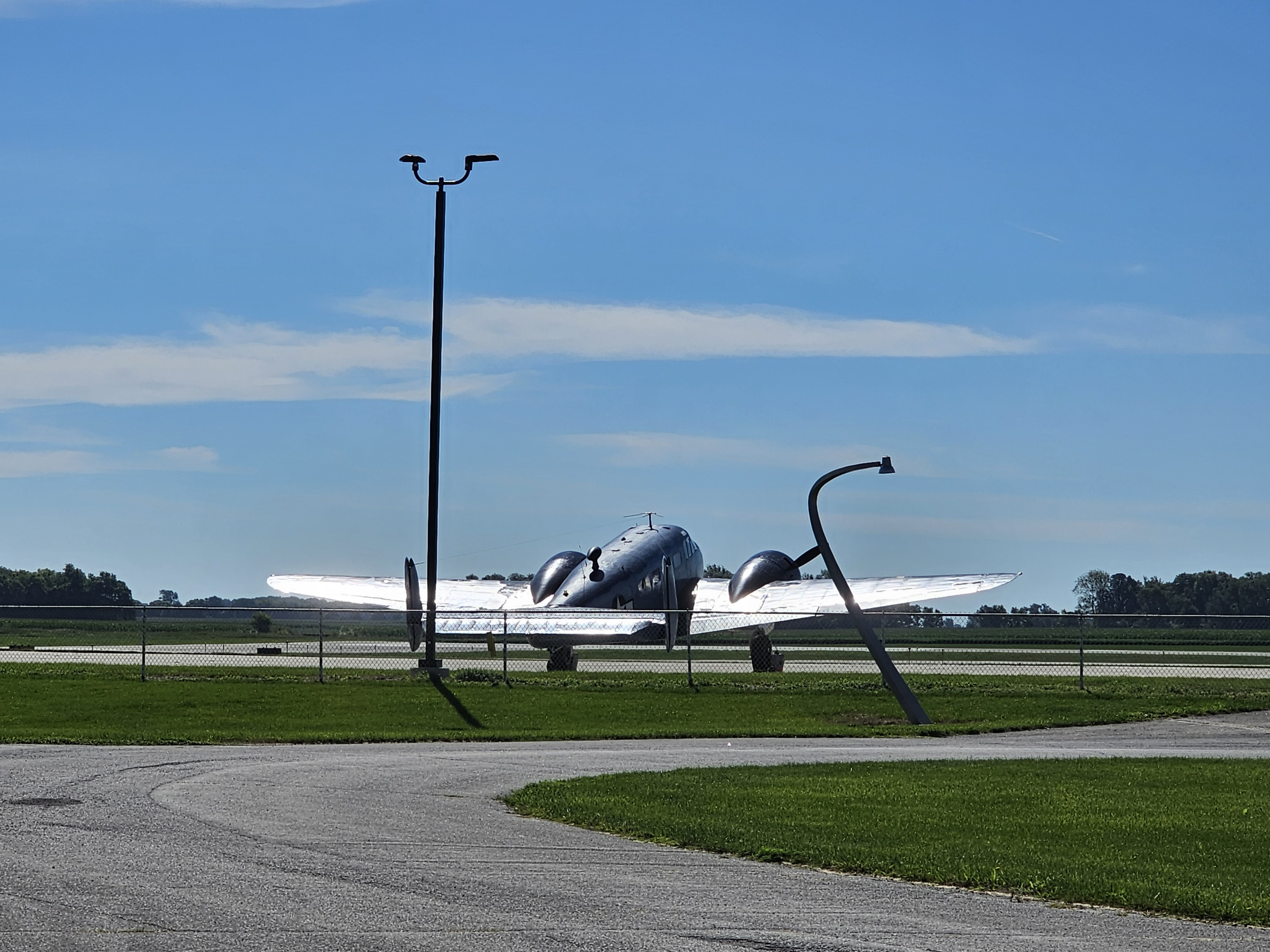
Airplane at Kokomo Municipal Airport

Kokomo Municipal Airport (IATA: OKK, ICAO: KOKK, FAA LID: OKK) is five miles northeast of Kokomo, in Howard County, Indiana. It is owned by the Kokomo Board of Aviation Commissioners. The FAA's National Plan of Integrated Airport Systems for 2009–2013 categorized it as a general aviation facility.

The first airline flights were Delta DC-3s in late 1947; Turner (Lake Central) arrived about 1950 and successor Allegheny pulled out in 1969–70. The Kokomo, Logansport, and Peru area was eligible for essential air service funding until 1989

== Facilities ==
The airport covers 590 acres (240 ha) at an elevation of 830 feet (253 m). It has two asphalt runways: 5/23 is 6,001 by 150 feet (1,829 x 46 m) and 14/32 is 4,002 by 150 feet (1,220 x 46 m).

In 2014, the airport had an average of 30 flight operations per day: 93% general aviation, 4% military, and 3% air taxi. 50 aircraft were then based at this airport: 90% single-engine, 4% multi-engine, 2% jet and 4% helicopter.

== See also ==
- List of airports in Indiana
