= Pope Field (Indiana) =

- IATA: GFD; ICAO: KGFD; FAA LID: GFD

Summary
- Airport type: Public use
- Owner: Pope Airport Inc.
- Serves: Greenfield, Indiana
- Elevation AMSL: 895 ft / 273 m
- Coordinates: 39°47′25″N 085°44′10″W

Map
- Location of airport in Indiana GFD (the United States)

Runways
Direction	Length		Surface
Direction	ft	m	Surface
18/36	2,165	660	Turf

Statistics (2010)
- Aircraft operations: 4,111
- Based aircraft: 14
- Source: Federal Aviation Administration

Pope Field (IATA: GFD, ICAO: KGFD, FAA LID: GFD) is a public use airport located two nautical miles (4 km) northeast of the central business district of Greenfield, in Hancock County, Indiana, United States. It is privately owned by Pope Airport Inc.

== Facilities and aircraft ==
Pope Field covers an area of 42 acres (17 ha) at an elevation of 895 feet (273 m) above mean sea level. It has one runway designated 18/36 with a turf surface measuring 2,165 by 150 feet (660 x 46 m).

For the 12-month period ending December 31, 2010, the airport had 4,111 aircraft operations, an average of 11 per day: 99% general aviation and 1% military. At that time there were 14 aircraft based at this airport: 50% single-engine and 50% ultralight.

== See also ==
- List of airports in Indiana
