= Lowell Airport (Indiana) =

- IATA: none; ICAO: none; FAA LID: C97

Summary
- Airport type: Public use
- Owner: Donald E. Bailey
- Serves: Lowell, Indiana
- Opened: August 1980
- Elevation AMSL: 675 ft / 206 m
- Coordinates: 41°13′48″N 087°30′28″W

Map
- Location of airport in Indiana

Runways
Direction	Length		Surface
Direction	ft	m	Surface
18/36	3,041	927	Turf

Statistics (2008)
- Aircraft operations: 4,176
- Based aircraft: 11
- Source: Federal Aviation Administration

Lowell Airport (FAA LID: C97) is a privately owned, public use airport located five nautical miles (9 km) southwest of the central business district of Lowell, a town in Lake County, Indiana, United States.

== Facilities and aircraft ==
Lowell Airport covers an area of 19 acres (8 ha) at an elevation of 675 feet (206 m) above mean sea level. It has one runway designated 18/36 with a turf surface measuring 3,041 by 100 feet (927 x 30 m).

For the 12-month period ending December 31, 2008, the airport had 4,176 general aviation aircraft operations, an average of 11 per day. At that time there were 11 single-engine aircraft based at this airport.

== See also ==
- List of airports in Indiana
