= Travis Holdman =

American politician

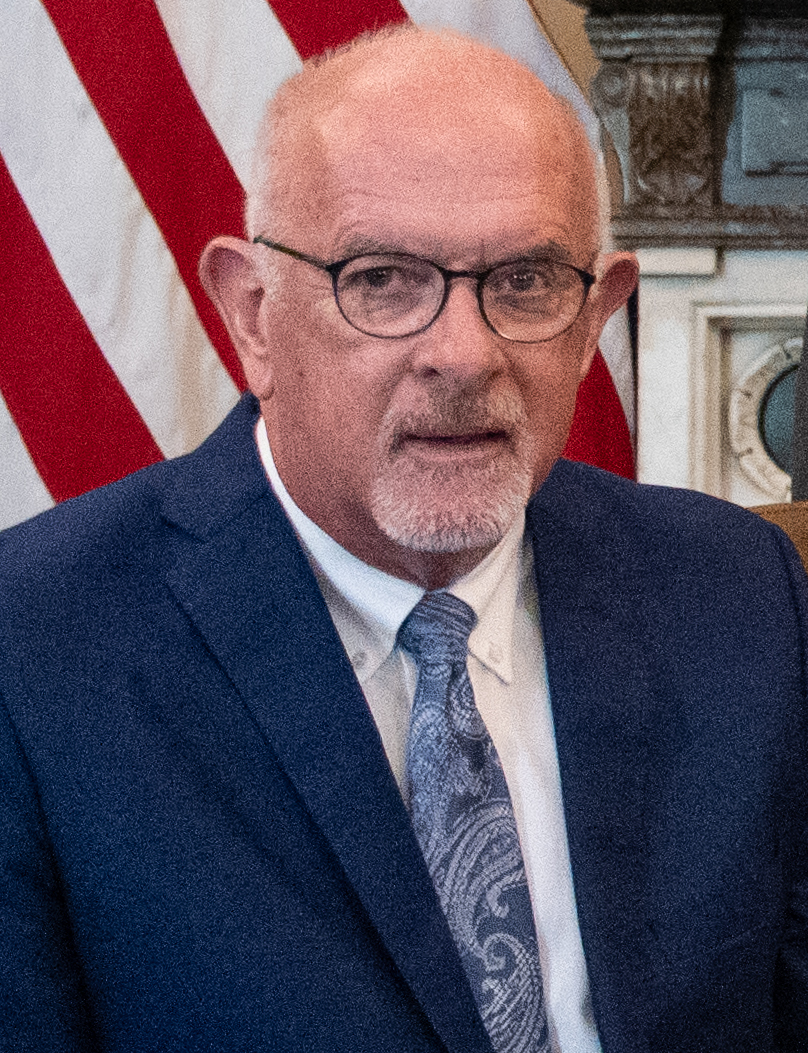

Member of the Indiana Senate from the 19th district
- In office April 11, 2008 – November 4, 2026
- Preceded by: David C. Ford
- Succeeded by: Blake Fiechter

Personal details
- Born: Travis L. Holdman; 1950 or 1951 (age 75–76)
- Party: Republican
- Spouse: Rebecca Murrell (m. 1973)
- Children: 2
- Education: Southeast Missouri State University (BA); University of St. Francis (MS); Indiana University Robert H. McKinney School of Law (JD)
- Occupation: Politician; lawyer

Travis L. Holdman (born 1950 or 1951) is a Republican former member of the Indiana Senate, representing the 19th District from 2008 to 2026. He was elected to the State Senate in March 2008, after the death of David C. Ford.

In 2025, Holdman drew national attention as one of 21 Republican senators to vote against mid-decade redistricting in Indiana, which would have net Republicans an additional 2 seats in the U.S. House of Representatives, prompting criticism from national and state Republicans such as president Donald Trump and governor Mike Braun, who endorsed a primary opponent.

In 2026, Holdman lost renomination to Blake Fietcher, 38.5%–61.4%.

== Early life ==
Travis L. Holdman was born in 1950 or 1951. He graduated with a Bachelor of Arts in psychology from Southeast Missouri State University. He attended Winebrenner Theological Seminary. He worked for Eastman Kodak Processing Laboratory in Findlay, Ohio. He graduated with a Master of Science from the University of St. Francis and a Juris Doctor from the Indiana University School of Law.

== Career ==
Holdman is a lawyer in Fort Wayne, Indiana, and specializes in estate planning and real estate law. He is also a corporate consultant. He served as a deputy prosecutor of Wells County from 1991 to 1996. He worked as a caseworker for two years and as an administrator of child protective services for 11 years. He was president and CEO of MarkleBank from 1996 to 2006. He was appointed by Governor Mitch Daniels to serve on the Indiana Department of Financial Institutions Board from 2005 to 2006.

Holdman is a Republican. He served on the Wells County Council and as chairman and vice chairman of the Wells County Republican Party. On March 31, 2008, Holdman was elected by a Republican precinct caucus to succeed David C. Ford as a member of the Indiana Senate, representing its 19th district. In 2009, he championed legislation to make texting while driving illegal in Indiana. He was one of the few Republican senators who rejected the efforts to redistrict the state in 2026. He lost renomination to Blake Fiechter in the Republican primary in May 2026.

Holdman is a volunteer with EQUIP, a Christian education organization. He is an ex-officio member of the Huntington University's board of trustees and president of the Huntington University Foundation's board of directors.

== Personal life ==
Holdman married Rebecca "Becky" Ann Murrell on June 9, 1973. They have two children, LeAnne and Wesley. He previously lived in Zanesville, Indiana. He lives in Markle. He serves on the administrative council of the Zanesville United Methodist Church. He is a member of the national board of Youth for Christ/USA.
