= Northern Wells Community Schools =

School district in Indiana, United States

Norwell Community Schools, formerly called Northern Wells Community Schools, is the school district that serves extreme Northern Wells County, Indiana.

Norwell consists of four schools: Norwell High School, Norwell Middle School, Lancaster Central Elementary School, Ossian Elementary School.

NWCS serves the towns of Ossian, Uniondale, Tocsin, Zanesville, Markle and the extreme outskirts of the town of Bluffton.

The district was formed after the 1967 consolidation of six township schools, with four original schools: OES, LCES, NMS, and NHS in 1967. The district was formerly named Northern Wells Community Schools until it was changed in 2023.

== Norwell High School ==
Norwell High School is at the intersection of U.S. Route 224 and Norwell Road just outside of Ossian, Indiana.

Features of the campus include a football field, baseball diamond, tennis courts, track and field, and over two acres of open grass for soccer.

Norwell High School has won the state championship for the best band performance in the US State of Indiana at Indianapolis for the last five years.

== Norwell Middle School ==
Norwell Middle School is located directly next to the high school. It recently has received a remodel and a new building addon.

== Ossian Elementary School ==
Ossian Elementary School currently stands where the old Ossian High School was before Northern Wells' consolidated all six township schools.

Principal: Dee Dee Larkey

== Lancaster Elementary School ==
Lancaster Elementary School is located in rural Bluffton, Indiana, on Jackson Street near Indiana Highway 1.

== Recent renovations ==
Over the last several years, Northern Wells Community Schools superintendents tried to make it so that the Norwell High School campus could be fully renovated, as the school needed repairs and revitalization.

In the spring of 2013, residents in the Northern Wells Community Schools district finally approved the US$5,400 referendum to renovate and revitalize the Norwell High School campus.

The renovations of the high school included a new cafeteria, a better air conditioning, heating and ventilation system, a new school office, 15 new school buses, and iPad mobile devices.
