= Craigville =

Craigville may refer to any one of the following:

- Craigville, a community now part of Miramichi, New Brunswick
- Craigville, Indiana
- Craigville, New York, a hamlet in the Town of Blooming Grove, New York
