= Rockcreek Township, Wells County, Indiana =

Rockcreek Township
- Township
- Location in Wells County
- Coordinates: 40°46′48″N 85°16′43″W
- Country: United States
- State: Indiana
- County: Wells

Government
  - Type: Indiana township

Area
  - Total: 35.91 sq mi (93.0 km^{2})
  - Land: 35.57 sq mi (92.1 km^{2})
  - Water: 0.34 sq mi (0.88 km^{2}) 0.95%
- Elevation: 820 ft (250 m)

Population (2020)
  - Total: 1,593
  - Density: 44.78/sq mi (17.29/km^{2})
- Time zone: UTC-5 (Eastern (EST))
  - Summer (DST): UTC-4 (EDT)
- ZIP codes: 46714, 46750, 46770, 46791
- Area code: 260
- GNIS feature ID: 453811

Rockcreek Township is one of nine townships in Wells County, Indiana, United States. As of the 2020 census, its population was 1,593 (up from 1,579 at 2010) and it contained 679 housing units.

== Geography ==
According to the 2010 census, the township has a total area of 35.91 square miles (93.0 km^{2}), of which 35.57 square miles (92.1 km^{2}) (or 99.05%) is land and 0.34 square miles (0.88 km^{2}) (or 0.95%) is water.

=== Cities, towns, villages ===
- Markle (east half)
- Uniondale (southwest half)

=== Unincorporated towns ===
- Rockford at 40.760047°N 85.313583°W

(This list is based on USGS data and may include former settlements.)

- Banner City – a hamlet about a mile west of Uniondale on the abandoned Erie Lackawanna railway section between Uniondale and Markle. It was made a station of the old Chicago & Atlantic Railway about 1887, which reorganized as the Chicago & Erie Railroad from 1890 to 1941. The old right-of-way could become part of an extended Erie Lackawanna Trail. Part of the hamlet may be in Union Township.

=== Adjacent townships ===
- Union Township (north)
- Jefferson Township (northeast)
- Lancaster Township (east)
- Harrison Township (southeast)
- Liberty Township (south)
- Salamonie Township, Huntington County (southwest)
- Rock Creek Township, Huntington County (west)
- Union Township, Huntington County (northwest)

=== Cemeteries ===
The township contains three cemeteries: Horeb, Sparks and Spider Hill.

=== Rivers ===
- Wabash River

== School districts ==
- Northern Wells Community Schools

== Political districts ==
- Indiana's 3rd congressional district
- State House District 79
- State Senate District 19
