= Union Township, Wells County, Indiana =

Union Township
- Township
- Location in Wells County
- Coordinates: 40°52′25″N 85°16′50″W
- Country: United States
- State: Indiana
- County: Wells

Government
  - Type: Indiana township

Area
  - Total: 35.25 sq mi (91.3 km^{2})
  - Land: 35.01 sq mi (90.7 km^{2})
  - Water: 0.24 sq mi (0.62 km^{2}) 0.68%
- Elevation: 797 ft (243 m)

Population (2020)
  - Total: 2,075
  - Density: 59.27/sq mi (22.88/km^{2})
- Time zone: UTC-5 (Eastern (EST))
  - Summer (DST): UTC-4 (EDT)
- ZIP codes: 46750, 46770, 46777, 46783, 46791, 46798, 46799
- Area code: 260
- GNIS feature ID: 453938

Union Township is one of nine townships in Wells County, Indiana, United States. As of the 2020 census, its population was 2,075 (down from 2,138 at 2010) and it contained 846 housing units.

== Geography ==
According to the 2010 census, the township has a total area of 35.25 square miles (91.3 km^{2}), of which 35.01 square miles (90.7 km^{2}) (or 99.32%) is land and 0.24 square miles (0.62 km^{2}) (or 0.68%) is water.

=== Cities, towns, villages ===
- Markle (northeast edge)
- Uniondale (northeast half)
- Zanesville (south half)

=== Adjacent townships ===
- Lafayette Township, Allen County (north)
- Pleasant Township, Allen County (northeast)
- Jefferson Township (east)
- Lancaster Township (southeast)
- Rockcreek Township (south)
- Rock Creek Township, Huntington County (southwest)
- Jackson Township, Huntington County (northwest)

=== Cemeteries ===
The township contains these four cemeteries: Hoverstock, Saint Johns, Uniontown and Old Uniontown.

== School districts ==
- Northern Wells Community Schools

== Political districts ==
- Indiana's 3rd congressional district
- State House District 79
- State Senate District 19
