= Greenville, Wells County, Indiana =

Greenville
- Unincorporated community
- Wells County's location in Indiana

- Location of Greenville in Wells County
- Coordinates: 40°39′16″N 85°13′35″W
- Country: United States
- State: Indiana
- County: Wells
- Township: Chester
- Elevation: 850 ft (260 m)
- Time zone: UTC-5 (Eastern (EST))
  - Summer (DST): UTC-4 (EDT)
- ZIP code: 46781
- GNIS feature ID: 435457

Greenville is an unincorporated community in Chester Township, Wells County, in the U.S. state of Indiana.

It is close to the town of Poneto.
