= Roll, Indiana =

- Unincorporated community and Census-designated place
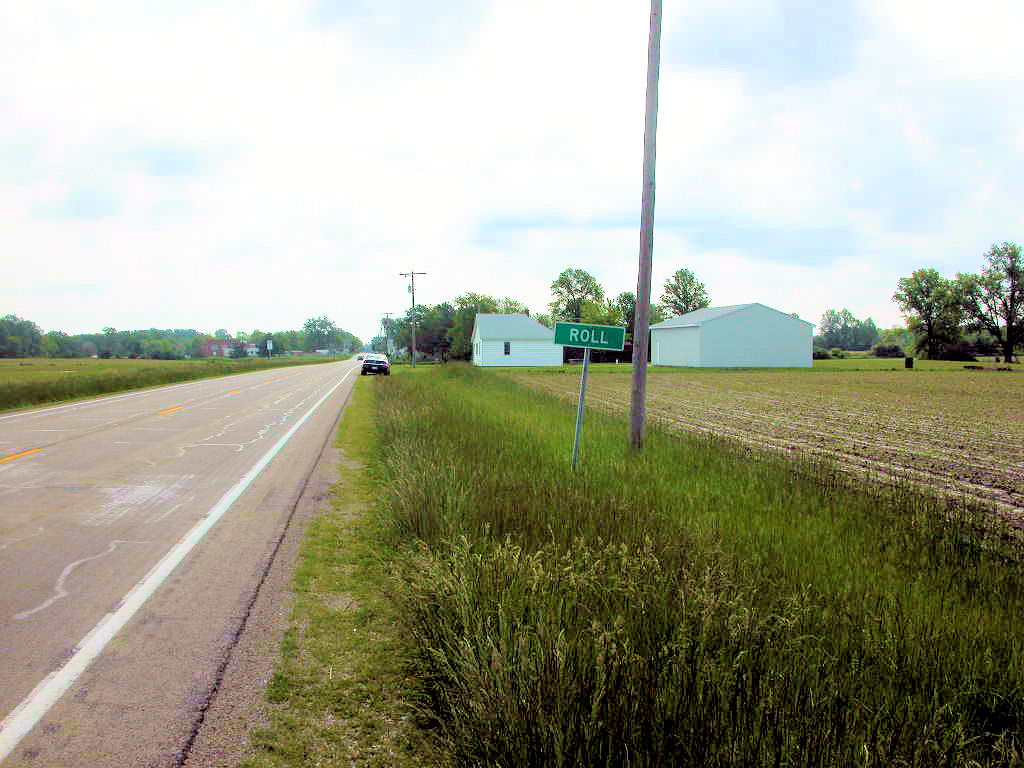
- Welcome to Roll, Indiana

- Blackford County's location in Indiana

- Location in Blackford County
- Coordinates: 40°33′11″N 85°23′36″W
- Country: United States
- State: Indiana
- County: Blackford
- Township: Washington
- Elevation: 873 ft (266 m)
- Time zone: UTC-5 (Eastern (EST))
  - Summer (DST): UTC-4 (EDT)
- ZIP code: 47348
- Area code: 765
- FIPS code: 18-65592
- GNIS feature ID: 2830321

Roll (pronounced "r-awl', rhymes with "fall") is an unincorporated community in Washington Township, Blackford County, in the U.S. state of Indiana. Nearly all of the community's businesses have been closed for years. Although the Blackford County Historical Society lists Roll as a ghost town, homes are still maintained in the area, and it is still listed as a populated place by the U.S. Geological Survey. The rural community is located on Indiana State Road 18, about one mile west of its intersection with Indiana State Road 3.

During the 1890s, Roll participated in the Indiana Gas Boom, as oil and gas wells were located nearby. Roll's E.C. Storms Natural Gas Company was one of Blackford County's many gas companies that existed during that time. The Gas Boom gradually ended during the beginning of the 20th century, and many small communities throughout the region never recovered. In addition, the quality of automobiles and roads improved over the following decades — indirectly contributing to the decline of many small communities as consumers drove to larger cities. As the largest community in Washington Township, Roll fared better than smaller communities in the area (such as Silas) because Roll had a better school and more merchants. As transportation improved even more, Roll merchants also lost business to larger communities. After the gas boom prosperity declined, agriculture again ascended to be the most important economic factor in Roll's corner of Blackford County. Unfortunately, prosperity in agriculture is not always reflected in nearby towns such as Roll, and many small towns in the "Corn Belt" continue to decline in size and affluence.

== History ==
In the early 19th century, much of what would become the state of Indiana was still frequented by native Indian tribes. The Miami tribe was the most powerful group of Indians in the region, and they were known to visit what would become northern Blackford County. Other tribes that visited the area were the Potawatomi and Delaware. Non-native settlers began arriving in what would become Blackford County during the 1830s. Blackford County was established in 1838 and 1839, as a section of swampland split from the west side of Jay County.

=== Dundee ===
Originally, the Roll community was named Dundee. A national Post Office directory for 1855 lists a Dundee in Blackford County. The 1860 United States census lists Dundee as the Post Office for Washington Township in Blackford County. The Dundee population at that time was 353 people living in 71 houses. Eight structures were listed as unoccupied. Almost every occupation cited is farmer. One of the farmers was Ohio-born Mathias Roll, age 55, living with his wife and five children (see picture of Census page in Wikimedia Commons). Ancestry and Census records indicate the Mathias Roll's second marriage was in Ohio in 1843, and from this marriage a child was born in Dundee in 1853. This indicates that the Roll family probably came to Dundee between 1843 and 1853. A story told by two Roll family members/descendants states that Mathias Roll used to ride his horse to Hartford City to pick up mail for folks living in Dundee. Eventually, the mail load became too much for one horse, so a Post Office was established in Dundee. Because a community named Dundee already existed elsewhere in the state, the Dundee Post Office in Washington Township was called the Roll Post Office.

Mathias Roll was still living with his family (including Edmund Roll) in Washington Township in 1870 according to the U.S. Census. The Census lists Hartford City, instead of Dundee, as the Post Office for the Roll family in Washington Township. An 1875 Post Office directory does not list Dundee or Roll. However, an 1876 atlas map still shows the town as Dundee. The community name of Dundee eventually fell out of favor because another town in Indiana already had that name, plus the Post Office was called the Roll Post Office. Gradually, Blackford County's Dundee became known as Roll.

By 1880, the region was still farming-oriented. The population of Washington Township, at 16 percent of the county total, was 1,273 out of the Blackford County total of 8,020. The county had 866 farms, and 46 manufacturing establishments that employed a total of only 171 people. Blackford County had a total of 25 registered physicians in 1882, and three were listed as living in Roll (not Dundee). A cemetery located in Roll, and now known as the Roll Cemetery, contains graves for at least twelve members of the Roll family (among other families). All Rolls buried there were born in the 19th century. A Matthias Roll (it has been spelled with one and two "t"s – his father used two) was buried there in 1885.

=== Gas boom ===
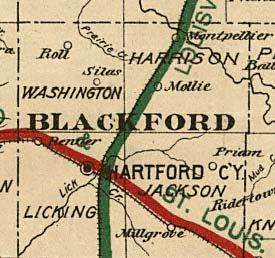
Railroad map of Blackford County in 1890s with Roll in the northwest quadrant

During the late 1880s, the discovery of natural gas in east-central Indiana led to a gas boom in the area. Numerous manufacturing companies moved to the Blackford County area, lured by promises of free or low-cost natural gas. Blackford County had 18 natural gas companies in 1895, including the E.C. Storms Natural Gas Company in Roll. In 1901, oil was struck on the Joseph Bird farm in Washington Township (near Roll). Oil was found in Blackford County's Washington and Harrison Townships, and one oil field near Roll was considered the most productive in the state. Blackford County's population increased from 8,020 in 1880 to 17,213 in 1900. However, by 1905 the boom was mostly over, as much of the natural gas was wasted or mismanaged.

The brief boom transformed much of east-central Indiana from an agriculture-oriented economy to an economy that also included manufacturing. From 1880 to 1900, Blackford, Delaware, and Grant counties all had their populations double. In 1901, Hartford City factories employed 1,077 people, and Montpelier factories employed 269. (A total of 171 people in the entire county worked in manufacturing in 1880.) Roll did not have access to a navigable waterway or a railroad (see 1890s map) – while nearby Marion (to the west), Montpelier (east), and Hartford City (south) all benefited from vital transportation resources. The lack of transportation facilities meant that Roll could not compete with nearby communities to attract manufacturers, and it did not take advantage of the natural gas and oil to the extent that other communities did.

=== After the boom ===
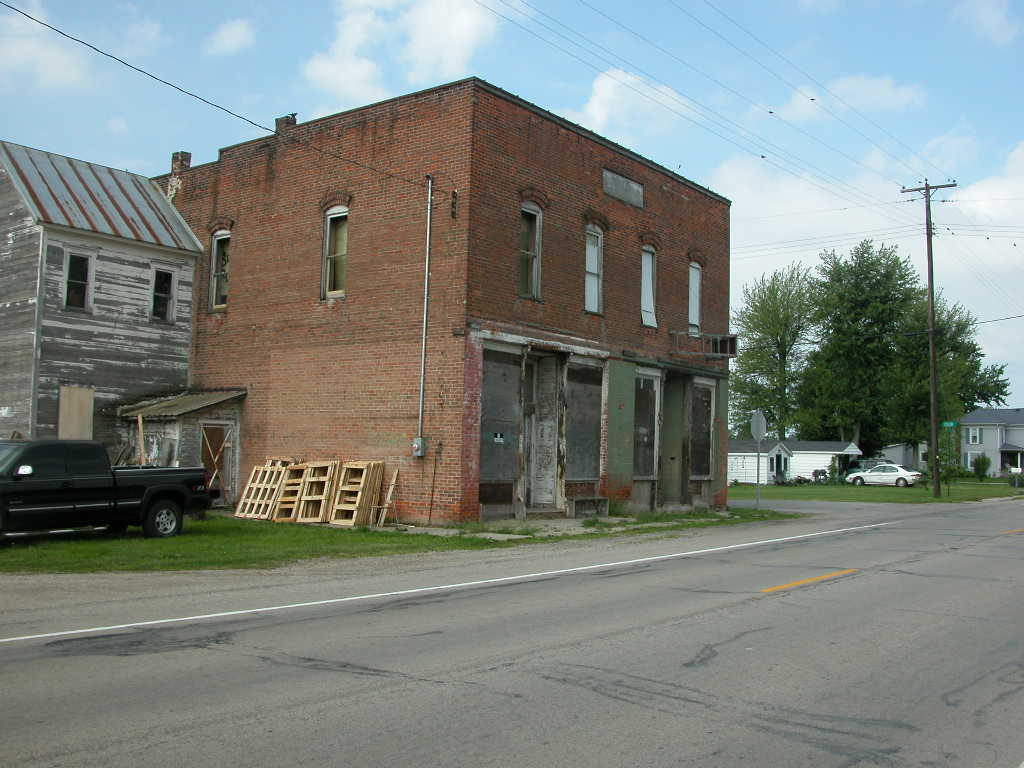
Last gas boom building in Roll (photo taken in 2010)

The boom ended in the first decade of the 20th century as the natural gas became depleted. Blackford County’s population peaked in the 1910 Census at 17,000, and the county has never again been the home of so many people. (The county’s population in the 2010 Census is 12,766.)

In 1907, Roll’s schoolhouse was condemned by the state of Indiana. The two-room building had been built in 1893. However, by 1916, Roll had a new school facility for all grades through high school, and a gym was added in 1938. The local sports teams eventually became known as the "Red-Rollers". The last graduating class from Roll High School was the Class of 1963, but the gym was still in use as late as 2010. After Roll's school was closed, children from the Roll area were bused to nearby Montpelier. In 1969, the entire county was consolidated into the newly built Blackford High School. The new school adopted the colors of red, white, and black – and the red was in honor of the old Roll Red-Rollers.

After the Gas Boom was over, the region remained transformed. Many of the manufacturers remained in the area, even though the gas was depleted – but these companies were located in cities such as Marion or Hartford City, not Roll. In addition, agricultural communities began to have limited growth in their populace because mechanization allowed farmers to farm more acreage (or the same acreage could be farmed by fewer people).

By 1930, 73-year-old Edmund Roll was the only person named Roll living in Washington Township. He was buried in the Roll Cemetery in 1943. Another Roll family member "returned" to be buried in the Roll Cemetery in 1951.

In 1951, Hoosier Hysteria erupted in the tiny community of Roll, as the Roll Red-Rollers won the Hartford City sectional in the Indiana High School basketball tournament. By the 1960s, Roll was still a small community with a barbershop and general store, a gas station or two, a church or two, and an empty school building. The gym was still used for elementary school basketball games by teams in Blackford County.

Today, the barber shop and general store are closed. The old building in the 2010 photo herein is thought to be one of the few buildings remaining in Roll that was built during the Gas Boom. "Doc" Banter's barber chair is now on display in the Blackford County Historical Society's museum. The old school has been torn down, although the gym still stands. However, Hoosier Hysteria "rolls" on in Roll and in the red worn by Blackford High School — and one is likely to still find a basketball hoop somewhere in the Roll community.

During the late evening hours of May 27, 2019, an EF3 tornado with winds of 150 mph occurred north of Roll, which caused 2 significant injuries. The tornado paralleled the county line with Wells County.

== Geography and geology ==
The Blackford County area sits on top of former gas and oil fields. The area also has limestone formed from silt and mud deposited from an ancient sea. The land is flat from the work of a glacier, and the soil is excellent for farming.

== Demographics ==
Historical population
Census	Pop.	Note	%±
2023 (est.)	164

The United States Census Bureau defined Roll as a census designated place in the 2022 American Community Survey.

=== Major highways ===
- Indiana State Road 3 is one mile east
- Indiana State Road 18

=== Adjacent cities ===
- Hartford City (about 5 miles south)
- Montpelier (about 6 miles east)
- Marion (about 14 miles west)

== See also ==
- Indiana Landmarks
