= Wellsburg =

Wellsburg is the name of several communities in the United States.

- Wellsburg, Indiana
- Wellsburg, Iowa
- Wellsburg, Kentucky
- Wellsburg, New York
- Wellsburg, North Dakota
- Wellsburg, West Virginia

Other:

- Wellsburg (PCH), the codename for an Intel chipset
