= Uniondale =

Uniondale or Union Dale may refer to:

In South Africa:

- Uniondale, Western Cape, a small town in South Africa

In the United States:

- Union Dale, Pennsylvania, a borough in Susquehanna County
- Uniondale, Indiana, a town in Wells County
- Uniondale, New York, a hamlet and census-designated place in Nassau County
