= Nottingham Township, Wells County, Indiana =

Nottingham Township
- Township
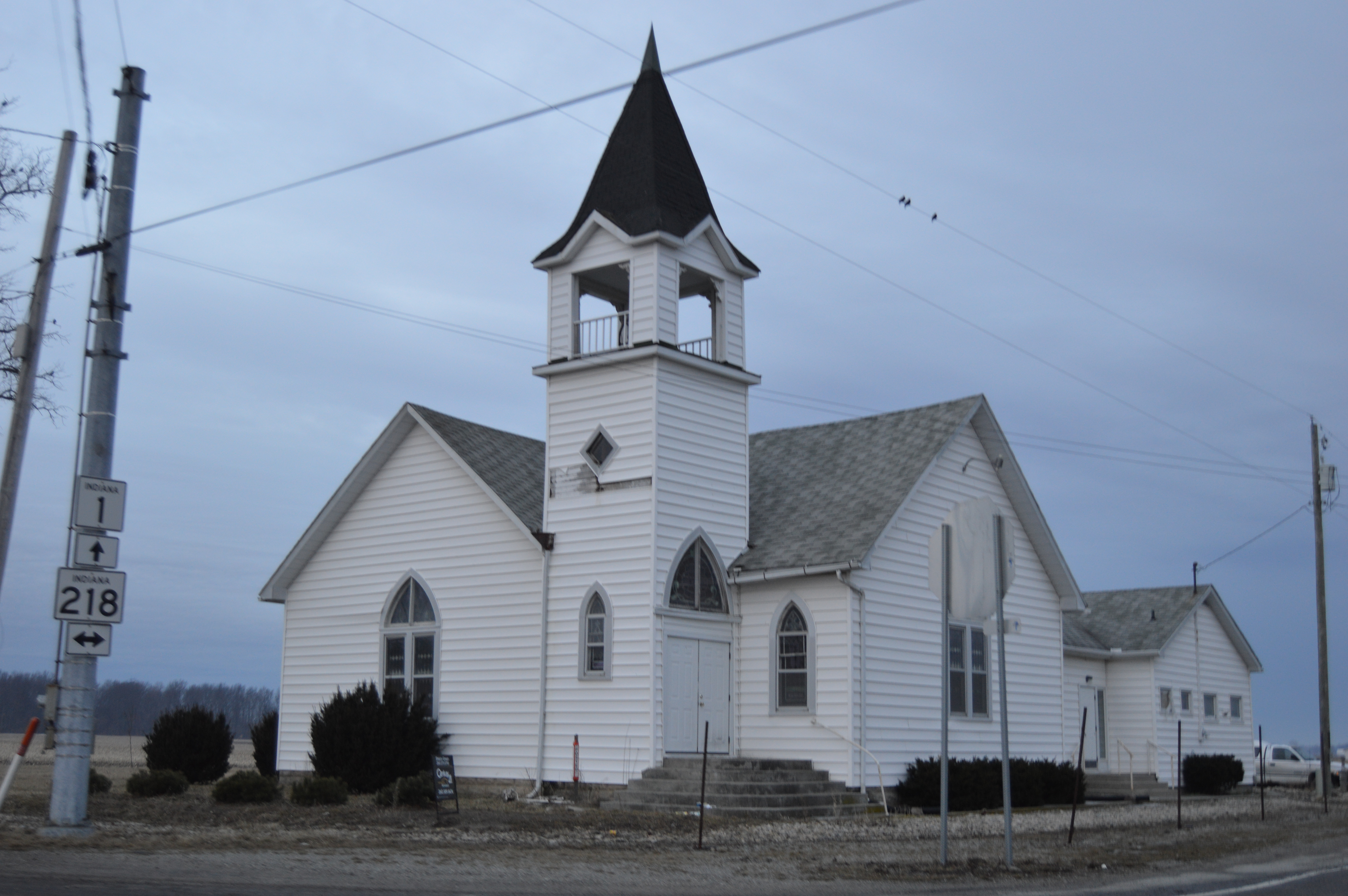
- Former Methodist church in Reiffsburg

- Location in Wells County
- Coordinates: 40°36′52″N 85°08′41″W
- Country: United States
- State: Indiana
- County: Wells

Government
  - Type: Indiana township

Area
  - Total: 48.09 sq mi (124.6 km^{2})
  - Land: 48.05 sq mi (124.4 km^{2})
  - Water: 0.04 sq mi (0.10 km^{2}) 0.08%
- Elevation: 860 ft (262 m)

Population (2020)
  - Total: 1,018
  - Density: 21.19/sq mi (8.180/km^{2})
- ZIP codes: 46714, 46740, 46759, 46781, 47359
- GNIS feature ID: 453680

Nottingham Township is one of nine townships in Wells County, Indiana, United States. As of the 2020 census, its population was 1,018 (down from 1,062 at 2010) and it contained 408 housing units.

== Geography ==
According to the 2010 census, the township has a total area of 48.09 square miles (124.6 km^{2}), of which 48.05 square miles (124.4 km^{2}) (or 99.92%) is land and 0.04 square miles (0.10 km^{2}) (or 0.08%) is water.

=== Unincorporated towns ===
- Domestic at 40.611713°N 85.088581°W
- Nottingham at 40.581157°N 85.150248°W
- Petroleum at 40.611435°N 85.150804°W
- Phenix at 40.58199°N 85.107192°W

(This list is based on USGS data and may include former settlements.)

=== Adjacent townships ===
- Harrison Township (north)
- Hartford Township, Adams County (east)
- Jackson Township, Jay County (southeast)
- Penn Township, Jay County (south)
- Harrison Township, Blackford County (southwest)
- Chester Township (west)
- Liberty Township (northwest)

=== Cemeteries ===
The township contains these four cemeteries: Bloxsom, Grannand, Old Salem and Stahl.

== School districts ==
- Southern Wells Community Schools

== Political districts ==
- Indiana's 3rd congressional district
- State House District 79
- State Senate District 19
