= Maurice Fisher =

American baseball player (1931–2022)

- Pitcher
- Born: February 16, 1931; Uniondale, Indiana, U.S.
- Died: May 13, 2022 (aged 91); Galion, Ohio, U.S.
- Batted: Right Threw: Right

MLB debut
- April 16, 1955, for the Cincinnati Redlegs

Last MLB appearance
- April 16, 1955, for the Cincinnati Redlegs

MLB statistics
- Win–loss record: 0–0
- Earned run average: 6.75
- Strikeouts: 1
- Innings pitched: 22/3
- Stats at Baseball Reference

Teams
- Cincinnati Redlegs (1955)

Maurice Wayne Fisher (February 16, 1931 – May 13, 2022) was an American right-handed pitcher in Major League Baseball who had an eight-season (1949–56) career in pro baseball, but appeared in only one major league game as a member of the 1955 Cincinnati Redlegs. The native of Uniondale, Indiana, was listed as 6 feet 5 inches (1.96 m) tall and 210 pounds (95 kg).

Fisher's lone big league appearance came on April 16, 1955, against the Milwaukee Braves at Crosley Field. He relieved starting pitcher Jim Pearce in the third inning with one out, two runs in, and baserunners on first and second bases. He retired Joe Adcock on a fly ball, then gave up an RBI single to Johnny Logan, before getting Jack Dittmer for the third out. In the fourth inning, Fisher allowed the only two runs of his big league career, on a home run to Del Crandall and an RBI single to Bobby Thomson, then held the Braves off the scoresheet in the fifth inning before his removal for a pinch hitter. Pearce was charged with the eventual 9–5 Cincinnati defeat. After his lone appearance for the Redlegs, Fisher was sent to the Pacific Coast League, where he spent the rest of the 1955 season.

In 22/3 innings pitched, Fisher allowed five hits, two earned runs and two walks, resulting in a major league earned run average of 6.75. He registered one strikeout (of Bill Bruton in the fifth inning).
