= Chester Township, Wells County, Indiana =

Chester Township
- Township
- Location in Wells County
- Coordinates: 40°36′25″N 85°16′07″W
- Country: United States
- State: Indiana
- County: Wells

Government
  - Type: Indiana township

Area
  - Total: 35.79 sq mi (92.7 km^{2})
  - Land: 35.62 sq mi (92.3 km^{2})
  - Water: 0.17 sq mi (0.44 km^{2}) 0.47%
- Elevation: 866 ft (264 m)

Population (2020)
  - Total: 954
  - Density: 26.8/sq mi (10.3/km^{2})
- ZIP codes: 46759, 46781, 46792, 47359
- GNIS feature ID: 453199

Chester Township is one of nine townships in Wells County, Indiana, United States. As of the 2020 census, its population was 954 (up from 936 at 2010) and it contained 379 housing units.

== Geography ==
According to the 2010 census, the township has a total area of 35.79 square miles (92.7 km^{2}), of which 35.62 square miles (92.3 km^{2}) (or 99.53%) is land and 0.17 square miles (0.44 km^{2}) (or 0.47%) is water.

=== Cities, towns, villages ===
- Poneto

=== Unincorporated towns ===
- Five Points at 40.581711°N 85.319972°W
- Greenville at 40.654491°N 85.22636°W
- Keystone at 40.595601°N 85.259416°W

(This list is based on USGS data and may include former settlements.)

=== Adjacent townships ===
- Liberty Township (north)
- Harrison Township (northeast)
- Nottingham Township (east)
- Harrison Township, Blackford County (south)
- Washington Township, Blackford County (southwest)
- Jackson Township (west)
- Salamonie Township, Huntington County (northwest)

=== Cemeteries ===
The township contains these two cemeteries: Miller and Snow.

=== Airports and landing strips ===
- Brinnemans Headacres Airport

== School districts ==
- Southern Wells Community Schools

== Political districts ==
- Indiana's 3rd congressional district
- State House District 79
- State Senate District 19

== History ==
Chester Township is home to the 5 Points School. It was built in 1876 and served as a school periodically through the late 1930s. It also served as a Grange Hall and many other community meetings were held here. While the 5 Points School stands to this day, its successor the Chester Center School, which was built in 1923, was demolished 43 years later in 1966 after the districts in southern Wells County were consolidated.
