= Jackson Township, Wells County, Indiana =

Jackson Township
- Township
- Location in Wells County
- Coordinates: 40°36′38″N 85°23′29″W
- Country: United States
- State: Indiana
- County: Wells

Government
  - Type: Indiana township

Area
  - Total: 35.97 sq mi (93.2 km^{2})
  - Land: 35.66 sq mi (92.4 km^{2})
  - Water: 0.31 sq mi (0.80 km^{2}) 0.86%
- Elevation: 846 ft (258 m)

Population (2020)
  - Total: 771
  - Density: 21.6/sq mi (8.35/km^{2})
- ZIP codes: 46792, 46952, 46991, 47348, 47359
- GNIS feature ID: 453474

Jackson Township is one of nine townships in Wells County, Indiana, United States. As of the 2020 census, its population was 771 (down from 837 at 2010) and it contained 310 housing units.

== Geography ==
According to the 2010 census, the township has a total area of 35.97 square miles (93.2 km^{2}), of which 35.66 square miles (92.4 km^{2}) (or 99.14%) is land and 0.31 square miles (0.80 km^{2}) (or 0.86%) is water.

=== Unincorporated towns ===
- Dillman at 40.610322°N 85.428862°W
- McNatts at 40.624489°N 85.391084°W
- Mount Zion at 40.650323°N 85.334694°W

(This list is based on USGS data and may include former settlements.)

=== Adjacent townships ===
- Salamonie Township, Huntington County (north)
- Liberty Township (northeast)
- Chester Township (east)
- Harrison Township, Blackford County (southeast)
- Washington Township, Blackford County (south)
- Monroe Township, Grant County (southwest)
- Van Buren Township, Grant County (west)
- Jefferson Township, Huntington County (northwest)

=== Cemeteries ===
The township contains these three cemeteries: Batson, Jones and Wright.

=== Rivers ===
- Salamonie River

=== Lakes ===
- Lost Lake

== School districts ==
- Southern Wells Community Schools

== Political districts ==
- Indiana's 3rd congressional district
- State House District 79
- State Senate District 19
