= Bethel Methodist Episcopal Church (Bluffton, Indiana) =

Historic church in Indiana, United States

- U.S. National Register of Historic Places
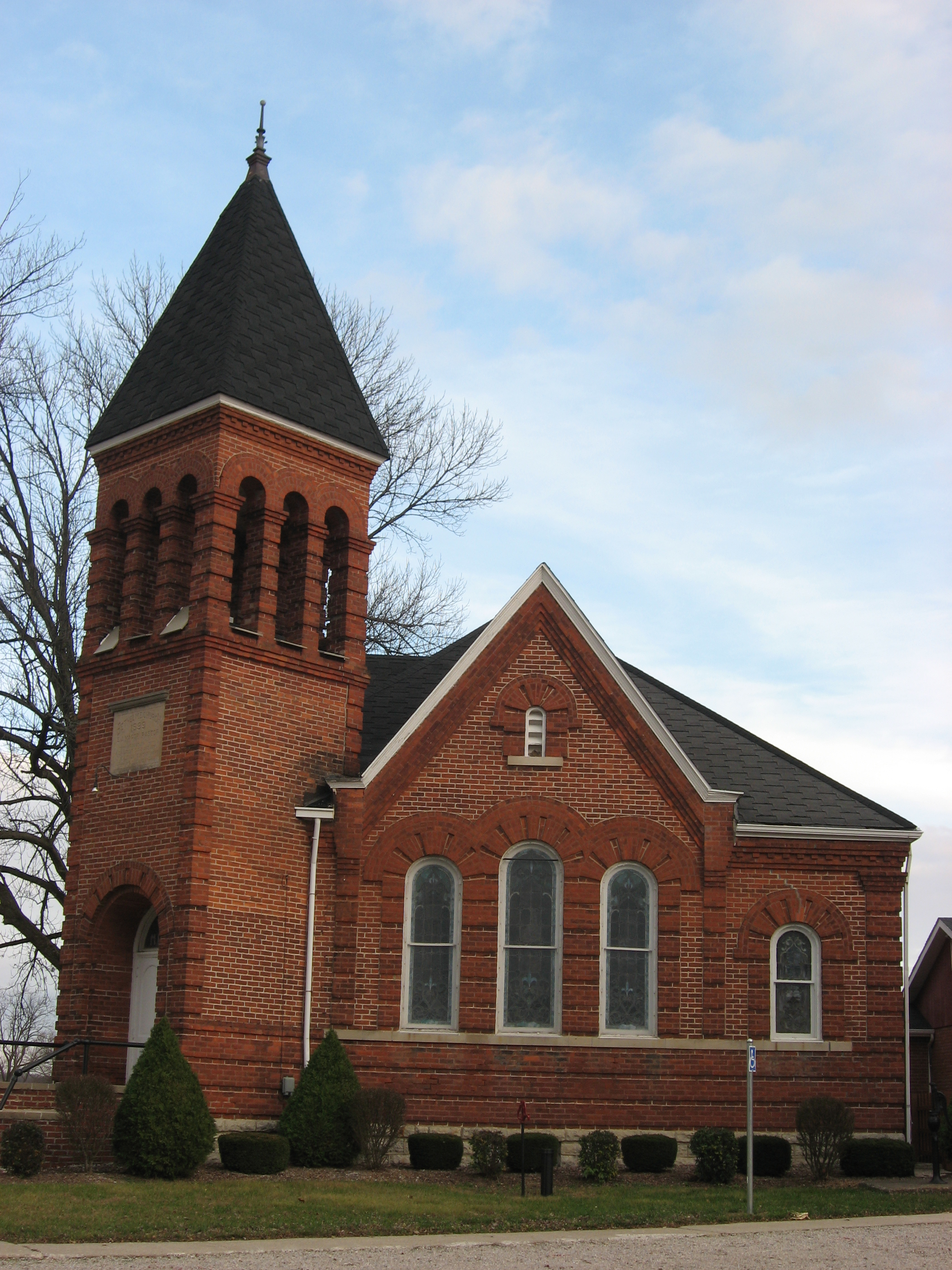
- Bethel Methodist Church, November 2011

- Location within Indiana Location within the United States
- Location: Southeast of Bluffton in Harrison Township, Wells County, Indiana
- Coordinates: 40°41′56″N 85°8′9″W
- Area: less than one acre
- Built: 1900
- Architect: Kibele, Cuno
- Architectural style: Romanesque
- NRHP reference No.: 84001747
- Added to NRHP: March 1, 1984

Bethel Methodist Episcopal Church, also known as the Bethel Church, is a historic Methodist Episcopal church located at Harrison Township, Wells County, Indiana. It was built in 1900, and is a two-story, irregular plan, Romanesque Revival style brick building. It is topped by hipped and gable roof masses. It features a three-story bell tower at the main entrance.

It was listed on the National Register of Historic Places in 1984.
