= Riverside, Wells County, Indiana =

Riverside
- Unincorporated community
- Wells County's location in Indiana

- Location of Riverside in Wells County
- Coordinates: 40°41′47″N 85°05′07″W
- Country: United States
- State: Indiana
- County: Wells
- Township: Harrison
- Elevation: 820 ft (250 m)
- Time zone: UTC-5 (Eastern (EST))
  - Summer (DST): UTC-4 (EDT)
- ZIP code: 46714
- Area code: 260
- GNIS feature ID: 442080

Riverside is an unincorporated community in Harrison Township, Wells County, in the U.S. state of Indiana.

It is located on Indiana State Road 116 near the town of Vera Cruz.
