= Jefferson Township, Wells County, Indiana =

Jefferson Township
- Township
- Seal

- Location in Wells County
- Coordinates: 40°52′17″N 85°09′07″W
- Country: United States
- State: Indiana
- County: Wells

Government
  - Type: Indiana township

Area
  - Total: 47.13 sq mi (122.1 km^{2})
  - Land: 46.98 sq mi (121.7 km^{2})
  - Water: 0.15 sq mi (0.39 km^{2}) 0.32%
- Elevation: 833 ft (254 m)

Population (2020)
  - Total: 5,841
  - Density: 124.3/sq mi (48.00/km^{2})
- Time zone: UTC-5 (Eastern (EST))
  - Summer (DST): UTC-4 (EDT)
- ZIP codes: 46731, 46777, 46791
- Area code: 260
- GNIS feature ID: 453503

Jefferson Township is one of nine townships in Wells County, Indiana, United States. As of the 2020 census, its population was 5,841 (up from 5,762 at 2010) and it contained 2,450 housing units.

== Geography ==
According to the 2010 census, the township has a total area of 47.13 square miles (122.1 km^{2}), of which 46.98 square miles (121.7 km^{2}) (or 99.68%) is land and 0.15 square miles (0.39 km^{2}) (or 0.32%) is water.

=== Cities, towns, villages ===
- Ossian

=== Unincorporated towns ===
- Greenwood at 40.844492°N 85.176915°W
- Kingsland at 40.830047°N 85.177193°W
- Tocsin at 40.830325°N 85.109136°W

(This list is based on USGS data and may include former settlements.)

=== Adjacent townships ===
- Pleasant Township, Allen County (north)
- Marion Township, Allen County (northeast)
- Preble Township, Adams County (east)
- Kirkland Township, Adams County (southeast)
- Lancaster Township (south)
- Rockcreek Township (southwest)
- Union Township (west)
- Lafayette Township, Allen County (northwest)

=== Cemeteries ===
The township contains these three cemeteries: El Honan, Oak Lawn and Prairie View.

=== Lakes ===
- Moser Lake

== School districts ==
- Northern Wells Community Schools

== Political districts ==
- Indiana's 3rd Congressional District
- State House District 79
- State Senate District 19
