= Travisville, Indiana =

- Unincorporated community
- Wells County's location in Indiana

- Location of Travisville in Wells County
- Coordinates: 40°41′31″N 85°12′29″W
- Country: United States
- State: Indiana
- County: Wells
- Township: Harrison
- Elevation: 843 ft (257 m)
- Time zone: UTC-5 (Eastern (EST))
  - Summer (DST): UTC-4 (EDT)
- ZIP code: 46714
- Area code: 260
- GNIS feature ID: 444860

Travisville is an unincorporated community in Harrison Township, Wells County, in the U.S. state of Indiana.

== History ==
Travisville was named after John Travis, who laid out the community.

A post office called Travis was established in 1873, and remained in operation until it was discontinued in 1877.
