= Liberty Center, Indiana =

- Unincorporated community and Census-designated place
- Wells County's location in Indiana

- Location of Liberty Center in Wells County
- Coordinates: 40°41′55″N 85°16′34″W
- Country: United States
- State: Indiana
- County: Wells
- Township: Liberty
- Elevation: 843 ft (257 m)
- Time zone: UTC-5 (Eastern (EST))
  - Summer (DST): UTC-4 (EDT)
- ZIP code: 46766
- Area code: 260
- FIPS code: 18-43542
- GNIS feature ID: 2830581

Liberty Center is an unincorporated community and census designated place (CDP) in Liberty Township, Wells County, in the U.S. state of Indiana. Liberty Center has two Christian churches, a volunteer fire department, a gas station, and a recreational park.

== History ==
Liberty Center was so named from its location near the geographical center of Liberty Township.

The post office at Liberty Center has been in operation since 1857.

== Demographics ==
The United States Census Bureau delineated Liberty Center as a census designated place in the 2022 American Community Survey.
