= Dillman, Indiana =

- Unincorporated community
- Wells County's location in Indiana

- Location of Dillman in Wells County
- Coordinates: 40°36′37″N 85°25′44″W
- Country: United States
- State: Indiana
- County: Wells
- Township: Jackson
- Elevation: 850 ft (260 m)
- Time zone: UTC-5 (Eastern (EST))
  - Summer (DST): UTC-4 (EDT)
- ZIP code: 46792
- GNIS feature ID: 433553

Dillman is an unincorporated community in Jackson Township, Wells County, in the U.S. state of Indiana.

== History ==
Dillman was named after Andrew Dillman, an early settler.

A post office was established at Dillman in 1880, and remained in operation until it was discontinued in 1907.

Dillman Church was founded in Dillman in 1889 and dedicated on December 22 of that year by Bishop Milton Wright.
