= McNatts, Indiana =

- Unincorporated community
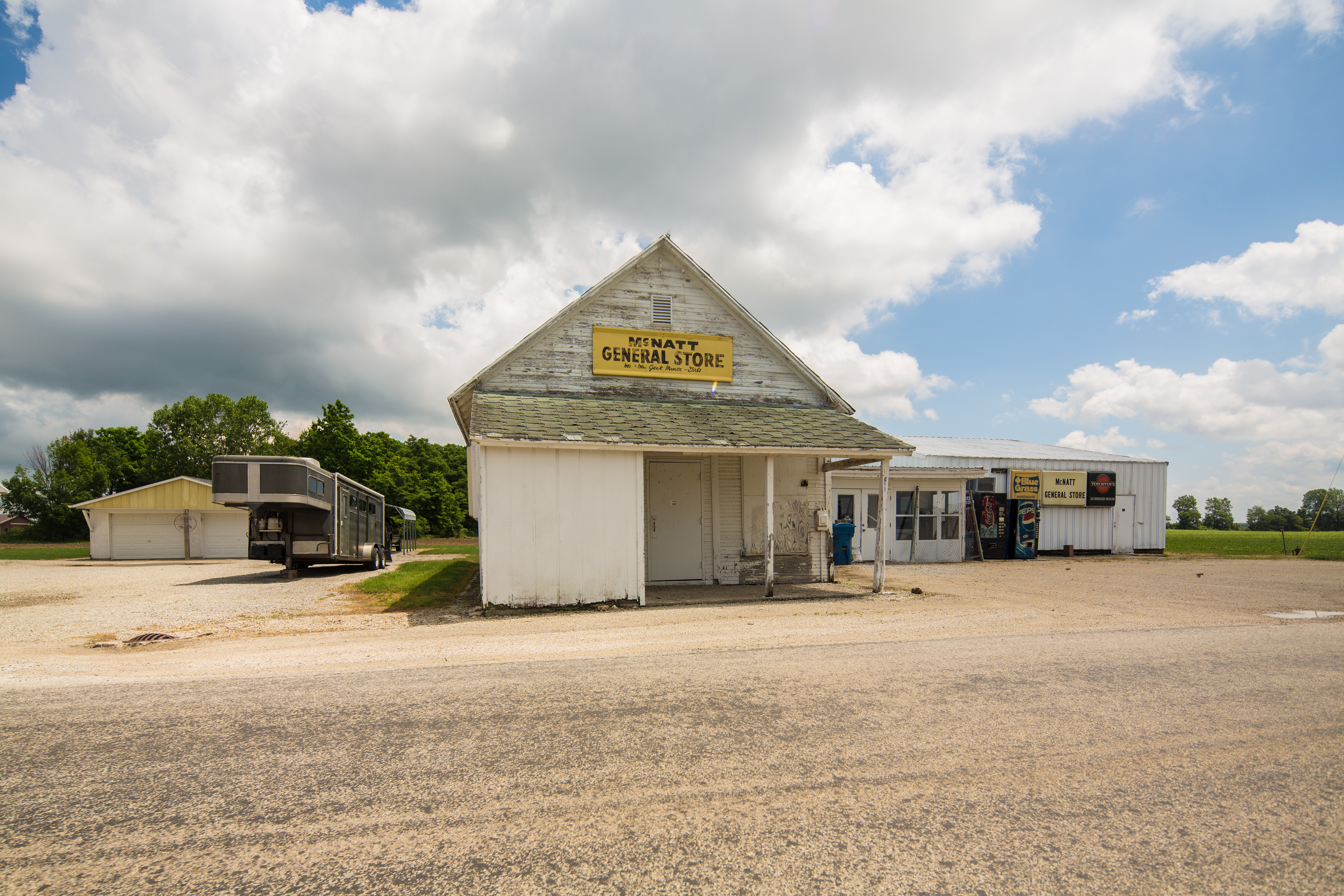
- McNatts General Store

- Wells County's location in Indiana

- Location of McNatts in Wells County
- Coordinates: 40°37′28″N 85°23′28″W
- Country: United States
- State: Indiana
- County: Wells
- Township: Jackson
- Elevation: 846 ft (258 m)
- Time zone: UTC-5 (Eastern (EST))
  - Summer (DST): UTC-4 (EDT)
- ZIP code: 46792
- GNIS feature ID: 438924

McNatts is an unincorporated community in Jackson Township, Wells County, in the U.S. state of Indiana.

== History ==
A post office was established at McNatts in 1890, and remained in operation until it was discontinued in 1903.
