= Liberty Township, Wells County, Indiana =

Liberty Township
- Township
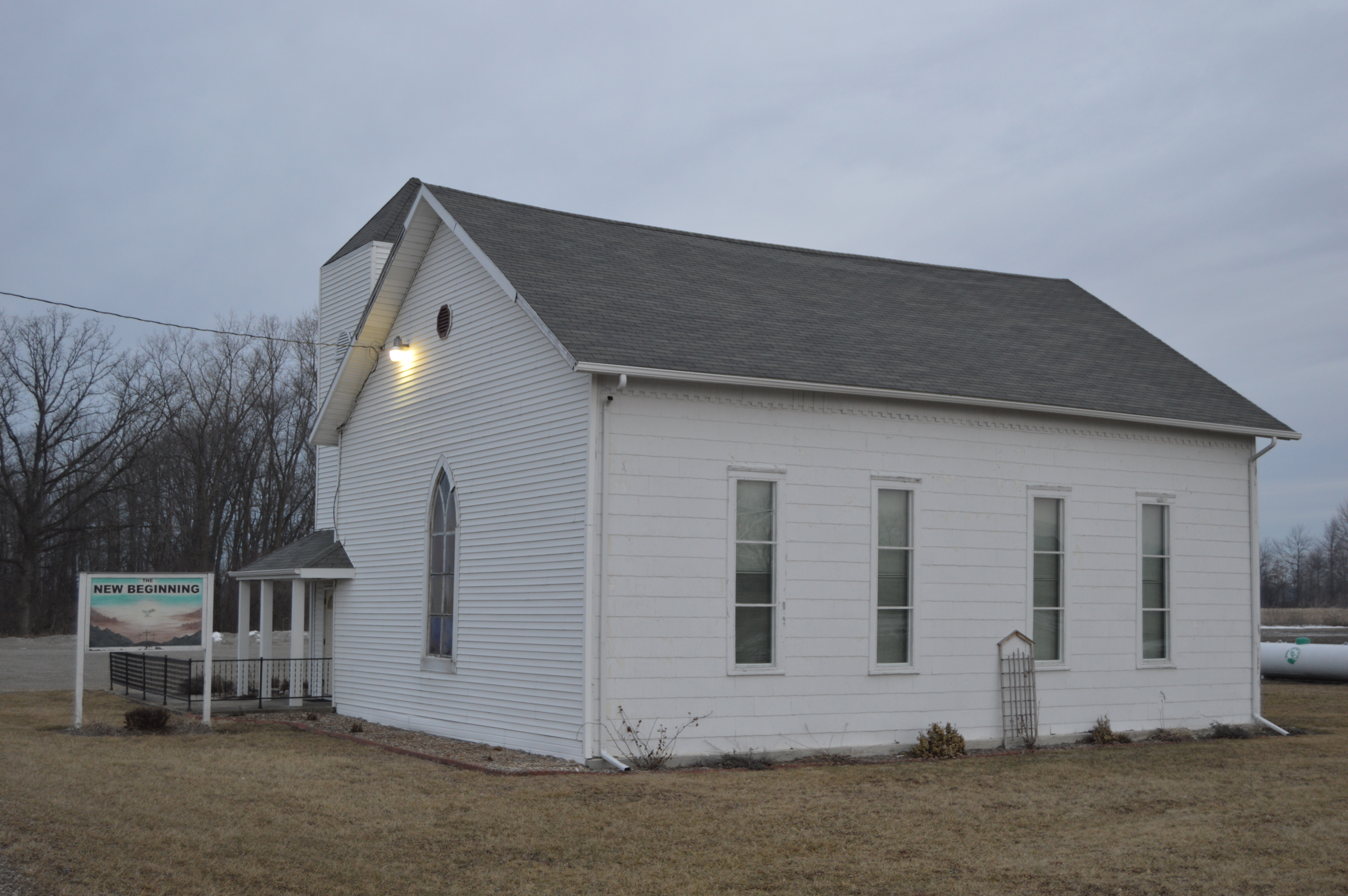
- Church on State Road 218

- Location in Wells County
- Coordinates: 40°41′54″N 85°16′42″W
- Country: United States
- State: Indiana
- County: Wells

Government
  - Type: Indiana township

Area
  - Total: 35.87 sq mi (92.9 km^{2})
  - Land: 35.78 sq mi (92.7 km^{2})
  - Water: 0.09 sq mi (0.23 km^{2}) 0.25%
- Elevation: 846 ft (258 m)

Population (2010)
  - Total: 1,086
  - Density: 30.4/sq mi (11.7/km^{2})
- Time zone: UTC-5 (Eastern (EST))
  - Summer (DST): UTC-4 (EDT)
- ZIP codes: 46714, 46750, 46766, 46781, 46792
- Area code: 260
- GNIS feature ID: 453566

Liberty Township is one of nine townships in Wells County, Indiana, United States. As of the 2010 census, its population was 1,086 and it contained 438 housing units.

== Geography ==
According to the 2010 census, the township has a total area of 35.87 square miles (92.9 km^{2}), of which 35.78 square miles (92.7 km^{2}) (or 99.75%) is land and 0.09 square miles (0.23 km^{2}) (or 0.25%) is water.

=== Cities, towns, villages ===
- Poneto (west three-quarters)

=== Unincorporated towns ===
- Liberty Center at 40.699213°N 85.280527°W
- Wellsburg at 40.666157°N 85.221638°W

(This list is based on USGS data and may include former settlements.)

=== Adjacent townships ===
- Rockcreek Township (north)
- Lancaster Township (northeast)
- Harrison Township (east)
- Nottingham Township (southeast)
- Chester Township (south)
- Jackson Township (southwest)
- Salamonie Township, Huntington County (west)
- Rock Creek Township, Huntington County (northwest)

=== Cemeteries ===
The township contains these two cemeteries: McFarren and Mossburg.

== School districts ==
- Southern Wells Community Schools

== Political districts ==
- Indiana's 3rd congressional district
- State House District 79
- State Senate District 19
