= Rockford, Wells County, Indiana =

Rockford
- Unincorporated community
- Wells County's location in Indiana

- Location of Rockford in Wells County
- Coordinates: 40°45′36″N 85°18′49″W
- Country: United States
- State: Indiana
- County: Wells
- Township: Rockcreek
- Elevation: 824 ft (251 m)
- Time zone: UTC-5 (Eastern (EST))
  - Summer (DST): UTC-4 (EDT)
- ZIP code: 46714
- Area code: 260
- FIPS code: 18-65394
- GNIS feature ID: 442219

Rockford is an unincorporated community in Rockcreek Township, Wells County, in the U.S. state of Indiana.
