= North Oaks, Indiana =

- Unincorporated community
- Wells County's location in Indiana

- Location of North Oaks in Wells County
- Coordinates: 40°46′36″N 85°10′26″W
- Country: United States
- State: Indiana
- County: Wells
- Township: Lancaster
- Elevation: 850 ft (260 m)
- Time zone: UTC-5 (Eastern (EST))
  - Summer (DST): UTC-4 (EDT)
- ZIP code: 46714
- Area code: 260
- FIPS code: 18-54972
- GNIS feature ID: 440281

North Oaks is an unincorporated community in Lancaster Township, Wells County, in the U.S. state of Indiana.
