= Mount Zion, Indiana =

- Unincorporated community
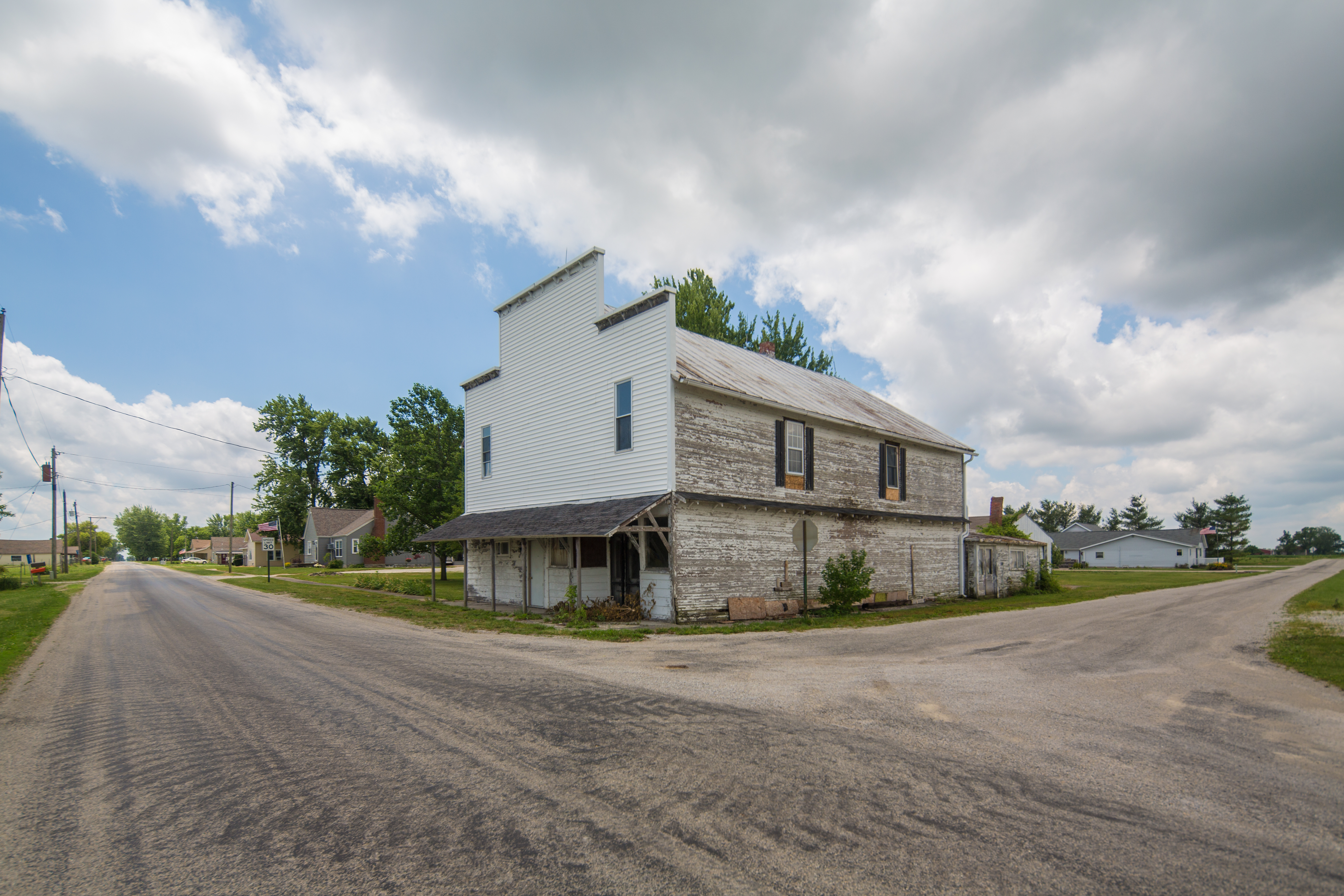
- Abandoned Post Office in Mount Zion

- Wells County's location in Indiana

- Location of Mount Zion in Wells County
- Coordinates: 40°39′01″N 85°20′05″W
- Country: United States
- State: Indiana
- County: Wells
- Township: Jackson
- Elevation: 863 ft (263 m)
- Time zone: UTC-5 (Eastern (EST))
  - Summer (DST): UTC-4 (EDT)
- ZIP code: 46792
- FIPS code: 18-51786
- GNIS feature ID: 439724

Mount Zion is an unincorporated community in Jackson Township, Wells County, in the U.S. state of Indiana.

== History ==
A post office was established at Mount Zion in 1873, and remained in operation until it was discontinued in 1917. The community took its name from the nearby Mount Zion Church.
