= Kingsland, Indiana =

- Unincorporated community
- Wells County's location in Indiana

- Location of Kingsland in Wells County
- Coordinates: 40°49′48″N 85°10′38″W
- Country: United States
- State: Indiana
- County: Wells
- Township: Jefferson
- Elevation: 853 ft (260 m)
- Time zone: UTC-5 (Eastern (EST))
  - Summer (DST): UTC-4 (EDT)
- ZIP code: 46777
- Area code: 260
- FIPS code: 18-39870
- GNIS feature ID: 437335

Kingsland is an unincorporated community in Jefferson Township, Wells County, in the U.S. state of Indiana.

== History ==
A post office was established at Kingsland in 1884, and remained in operation until 1922. An old variant name of the community was called Parkinson.

On September 21, 1910, an interurban rail crash occurred in Kingsland due to a failure to pull over. 41 passengers died, and safety protocols were strengthened thereafter.
