= Nottingham, Indiana =

- Unincorporated community
- Wells County's location in Indiana

- Location of Nottingham in Wells County
- Coordinates: 40°34′52″N 85°09′01″W
- Country: United States
- State: Indiana
- County: Wells
- Township: Nottingham
- Elevation: 886 ft (270 m)
- Time zone: UTC-5 (Eastern (EST))
  - Summer (DST): UTC-4 (EDT)
- ZIP code: 47359
- GNIS feature ID: 440360

Nottingham is an unincorporated community in Nottingham Township, Wells County, in the U.S. state of Indiana.

== History ==
A post office was established at Nottingham in 1848, and remained in operation until it was discontinued in 1905.
