= Greenwood, Wells County, Indiana =

Greenwood
- Unincorporated community
- Wells County's location in Indiana

- Location of Greenwood in Wells County
- Coordinates: 40°50′40″N 85°10′37″W
- Country: United States
- State: Indiana
- County: Wells
- Township: Jefferson
- Elevation: 853 ft (260 m)
- Time zone: UTC-5 (Eastern (EST))
  - Summer (DST): UTC-4 (EDT)
- ZIP code: 46777
- Area code: 260
- GNIS feature ID: 435462

Greenwood is an unincorporated community in Jefferson Township, Wells County, in the U.S. state of Indiana.
