= Lancaster Township, Wells County, Indiana =

Lancaster Township
- Township
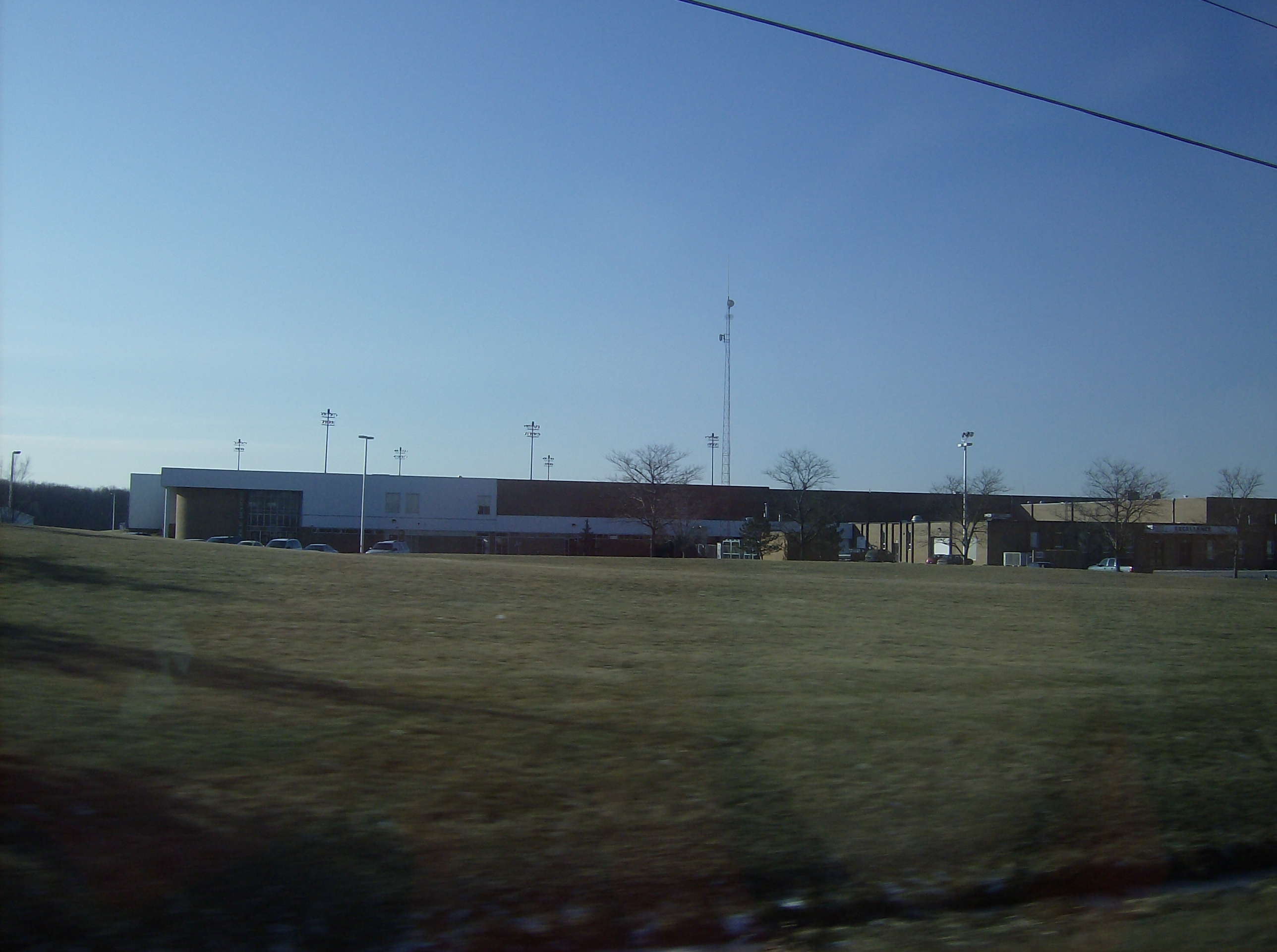
- Norwell High School lies along U.S. Route 224 in northwestern Lancaster Township.

- Location in Wells County
- Coordinates: 40°47′09″N 85°08′19″W
- Country: United States
- State: Indiana
- County: Wells

Government
  - Type: Indiana township

Area
  - Total: 47.98 sq mi (124.3 km^{2})
  - Land: 47.59 sq mi (123.3 km^{2})
  - Water: 0.39 sq mi (1.0 km^{2}) 0.81%
- Elevation: 860 ft (262 m)

Population (2020)
  - Total: 5,841
  - Density: 122.7/sq mi (47.39/km^{2})
- Time zone: UTC-5 (Eastern (EST))
  - Summer (DST): UTC-4 (EDT)
- ZIP codes: 46714, 46731, 46733, 46777, 46791
- Area code: 260
- GNIS feature ID: 453540

Lancaster Township is one of nine townships in Wells County, Indiana, United States. As of the 2020 census, its population was 5,841 (up from 5,705 at 2010) and it contained 2,450 housing units.

== Geography ==
According to the 2010 census, the township has a total area of 47.98 square miles (124.3 km^{2}), of which 47.59 square miles (123.3 km^{2}) (or 99.19%) is land and 0.39 square miles (1.0 km^{2}) (or 0.81%) is water.

=== Cities, towns, villages ===
- Bluffton (the county seat) (north half)

=== Unincorporated towns ===
- Craigville at 40.778380°N 85.090803°W
- Curryville at 40.786436°N 85.071913°W
- Murray at 40.791992°N 85.200804°W
- North Oaks at 40.776714°N 85.173859°W
- Tocsin at 40.830278°N 85.109167°W
- Toll Gate Heights at 40.757269°N 85.165803°W

(This list is based on USGS data and may include former settlements.)

=== Adjacent townships ===
- Jefferson Township (north)
- Preble Township, Adams County (northeast)
- Kirkland Township, Adams County (east)
- Harrison Township (south)
- Liberty Township (southwest)
- Rockcreek Township (west)
- Union Township (northwest)

=== Cemeteries ===
The township contains four cemeteries: Fair View, Murray, Oakland, and Old Bluffton.

=== Airports and landing strips ===
- The Lazy K Airport

The "K" stands for Kunkel. Arden G. Kunkel established the grass strip airport in 1963. It was most recently owned and operated by Terry and Annie Hoffmeier. Annie is the youngest daughter of the late Arden G. Kunkel. It was a private airport and is restricted to hours of operation and plane usage. In May 2013, the airport and runways shut down after 50 years of operation.

== School districts ==
- Norwell Community Schools

== Political districts ==
- Indiana's 3rd congressional district
- State House District 79
- State Senate District 19
