= David C. Ford =

American politician and lawyer (1949–2008)

Member of the Indiana Senate from the 19th district
- In office 1995 – March 5, 2008
- Succeeded by: Travis Holdman

Personal details
- Born: David Clayton Ford; March 3, 1949 Hartford City, Indiana, U.S.
- Died: March 5, 2008 (aged 59) Hartford City, Indiana, U.S.
- Resting place: Brookside Memorial Park; Montpelier, Indiana, U.S.
- Party: Republican
- Spouse: Joyce Ann Bonjour (m. 1970)
- Children: 4
- Education: Indiana University Bloomington; Ball State University (MBA); Indiana University School of Law (JD)
- Occupation: Politician; lawyer

David Clayton Ford (March 3, 1949 – March 5, 2008) was an American politician and lawyer from Indiana. He served as a member of the Indiana Senate, representing district 19, from 1995 to his death in 2008.

== Early life ==
David Clayton Ford was born on March 3, 1949, in Hartford City, Indiana, to Barbara (née McVicker) and Clayton Ford. He grew up in Montpelier and graduated from Montpelier High School in 1967. He graduated from Indiana University Bloomington in 1973 with a bachelor's degree in government. Ford was a member of the United States Air Force Reserve while at Indiana University Bloomington.

In 1973, Ford served as an intern for a Republican member of the Indiana Senate. He graduated from the Indiana University School of Law with a Juris Doctor in 1976. He then did post graduate studies on public administration. He graduated from Ball State University with a Master of Business Administration in 1990.

== Career ==
Ford served as city attorney of Montpelier from 1977 to 1979. He was the law partner of Allen C. Mattson from October 1976 to November 1978. He served as Mattson's campaign manager in 1978 when Mattson ran for prosecuting attorney of Blackford County. Ford then served as deputy prosecutor under Mattson following the election. He remained as Mattson's deputy until August 1979. Ford was elected as the Blackford County prosecuting attorney in 1982 of the 71st judicial court. He defeated the incumbent and his previous law partner Allen C. Mattson in that race. Following the election, in January 1983, Ford sued Mattson for access to his files while serving as prosecuting attorney, arguing the records are state property. Mattson refused to give any files besides those of pending cases arguing that the closed files "are in no way official records" and that "the court has the official records." Mattson also stated that "people are going to want to talk to the prosecutor who actually prosecuted the cases" and that he would need the files to allow for that. He then had a law practice with Dean Young called Ford & Young. He also served as town attorney of Shamrock Lakes. In May 1985, he was nominated for U.S. district attorney for the northern district by the Federal Judicial Nominating Commission. He also served as general counsel of the Indiana Farm Bureau.

Ford was a Republican. In 1994, he was elected to the Indiana Senate, representing district 19. He was known in the senate for covering technology issues. He served on the economic development and technology committee as chairman of the technology subcommittee. He also served on the education and career development, tax and fiscal policy, and judiciary committees. On January 15, 2008, he left his political role due to illness.

== Personal life ==
Ford married Joyce Ann Bonjour on August 22, 1970. His wife was a registered nurse. They had three sons and a daughter, Jeffrey David, Matthew, Andrew Clayton, and Kelly Sue. He was a member of St. John's Catholic Church in Hartford City.

Ford died of pancreatic cancer on March 5, 2008, at his home in Hartford City. He was buried in Brookside Memorial Park in Montpelier.

== Awards and recognition ==
Ford was named Hartford City Chamber of Commerce Man of the Year in 1978. He was also named as a Sagamore of the Wabash by Governor Otis Bowen in 1978. He was made honorary secretary of state by Secretary Edwin Simcox. In 1982, he was named Young Man of America by the U.S. Jaycees.

In 1997, Ford was named Legislator of the Year by the Insurance Institute of Indiana. In 1998, he received the Legislator of the Year Award from the Indiana Association for the Education of Young Children. In 1998, he also received the Champion of Small Business Award from the Indiana Chamber of Commerce.
