= Petroleum, Indiana =

- Unincorporated community and Census-designated place
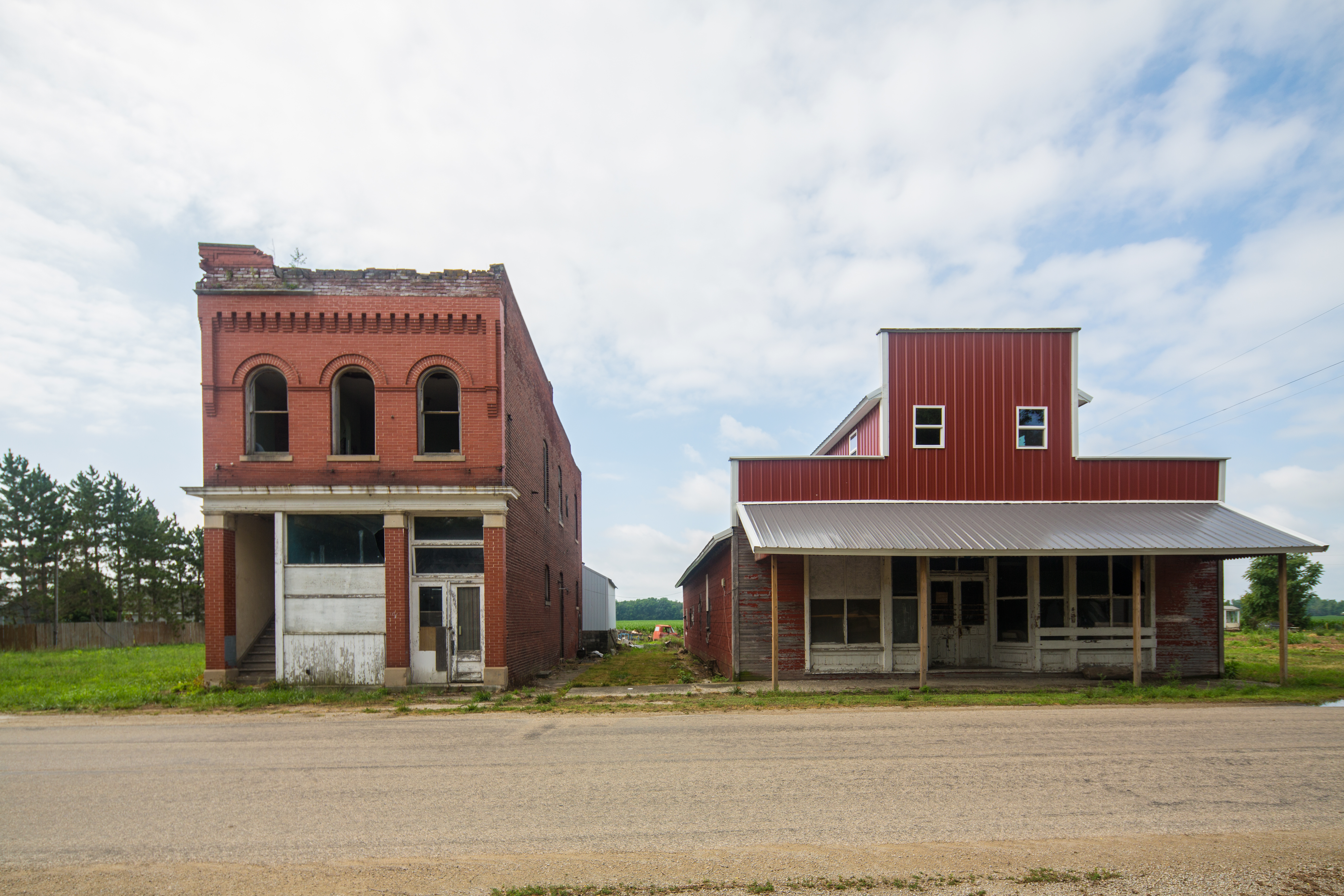
- Unused buildings in Petroleum

- Wells County's location in Indiana

- Location of Petroleum in Wells County
- Coordinates: 40°36′45″N 85°09′08″W
- Country: United States
- State: Indiana
- County: Wells
- Township: Nottingham
- Elevation: 860 ft (260 m)
- Time zone: UTC-5 (Eastern (EST))
  - Summer (DST): UTC-4 (EDT)
- ZIP code: 46778
- Area code: 260
- FIPS code: 18-59418
- GNIS feature ID: 2830582

Petroleum is an unincorporated community in Nottingham Township, Wells County, Indiana, United States. Petroleum has a population of 196.

== History ==
Petroleum was platted in 1894, and is so named because it was laid out in an oil field. The post office at Petroleum has been in operation since 1894.

== Demographics ==
The United States Census Bureau designated Petroleum as a census designated place in the 2022 American Community Survey.
