= Murray, Indiana =

- Unincorporated community
- Wells County's location in Indiana

- Location of Murray in Wells County
- Coordinates: 40°47′31″N 85°12′03″W
- Country: United States
- State: Indiana
- County: Wells
- Township: Lancaster
- Elevation: 807 ft (246 m)
- Time zone: UTC-5 (Eastern (EST))
  - Summer (DST): UTC-4 (EDT)
- ZIP code: 46714
- Area code: 260
- FIPS code: 18-51966
- GNIS feature ID: 439894

Murray is an unincorporated area near Lancaster Township, Wells County, in the U.S. state of Indiana.

== History ==
An old variant name of the community was called New Lancaster. A post office was established at Murray in 1837, and remained in operation until 1902.

On February 29, 1996, Murray was inadvertently strafed by a military aircraft, though no injuries resulted.

In January 2020, a town-wide vote took place which led to Zakary J. Dobson being the mayor of Murray. The First Lady is Brittany Dobson

Former Mayor's include: Brian Fennig and Jon Dobson.

== Geography ==
Murray is located on State Highway 116.
