= Harrison Township, Wells County, Indiana =

Harrison Township
- Township
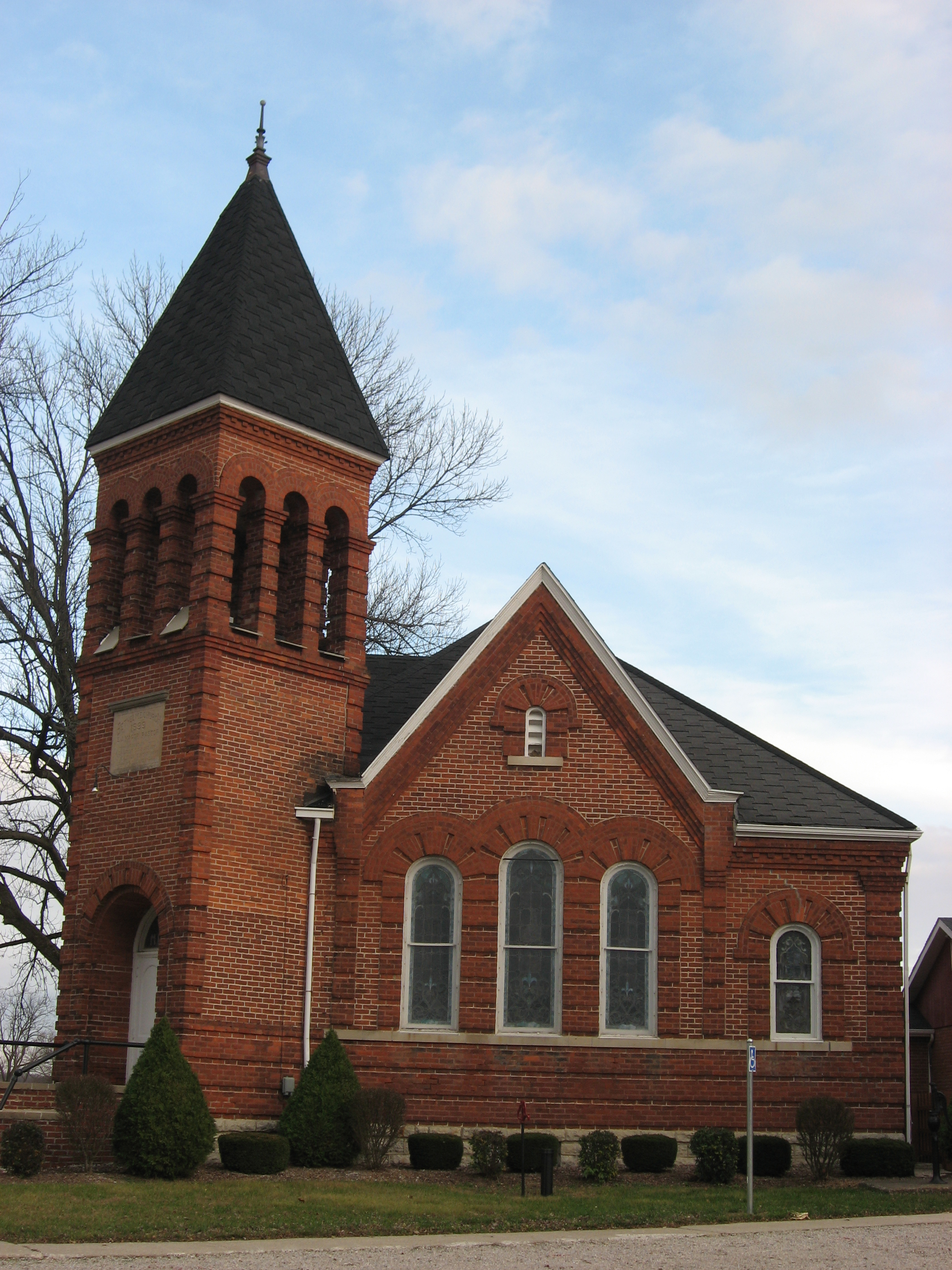
- Bethel Methodist Church, a historic site in the township

- Location in Wells County
- Coordinates: 40°41′35″N 85°08′51″W
- Country: United States
- State: Indiana
- County: Wells

Government
  - Type: Indiana township

Area
  - Total: 48.26 sq mi (125.0 km^{2})
  - Land: 47.83 sq mi (123.9 km^{2})
  - Water: 0.43 sq mi (1.1 km^{2}) 0.89%
- Elevation: 837 ft (255 m)

Population (2020)
  - Total: 8,810
  - Density: 184/sq mi (71.1/km^{2})
- Time zone: UTC-5 (Eastern (EST))
  - Summer (DST): UTC-4 (EDT)
- ZIP codes: 46714, 46781
- Area code: 260
- GNIS feature ID: 453400

Harrison Township is one of nine townships in Wells County, Indiana, United States. As of the 2020 census, its population was 8,810 (up from 8,531 at 2010) and it contained 3,754 housing units.

== History ==
Six Mile Church, the first organized church in Wells County was formed in Harrison Township by Hallet Barber on September 2, 1838.

The Bethel Methodist Episcopal Church was listed on the National Register of Historic Places in 1984.

== Geography ==
According to the 2010 census, the township has a total area of 48.26 square miles (125.0 km^{2}), of which 47.83 square miles (123.9 km^{2}) (or 99.11%) is land and 0.43 square miles (1.1 km^{2}) (or 0.89%) is water.

=== Cities, towns, villages ===
- Bluffton (the county seat) (south half)
- Poneto (east quarter)
- Vera Cruz

=== Unincorporated towns ===
- Reiffsburg at 40.655879°N 85.151915°W
- Riverside at 40.696435°N 85.085247°W
- Travisville at 40.691991°N 85.208026°W

(This list is based on USGS data and may include former settlements.)

=== Adjacent townships ===
- Lancaster Township (north)
- Kirkland Township, Adams County (northeast)
- French Township, Adams County (east)
- Hartford Township, Adams County (southeast)
- Nottingham Township (south)
- Chester Township (southwest)
- Liberty Township (west)
- Rockcreek Township (northwest)

=== Cemeteries ===
The township contains four cemeteries: Elm Grove, Grove, Linn and Saint Johns. The County Poor Farm Cemetery no longer exists, although burial records are available.

=== Rivers ===
- Wabash River

=== Lakes ===
- Kunkel Lake

== School districts ==
- Metropolitan School District of Bluffton-Harrison

== Political districts ==
- Indiana's 3rd Congressional District
- State House District 79
- State Senate District 19
