= Domestic, Indiana =

- Unincorporated community
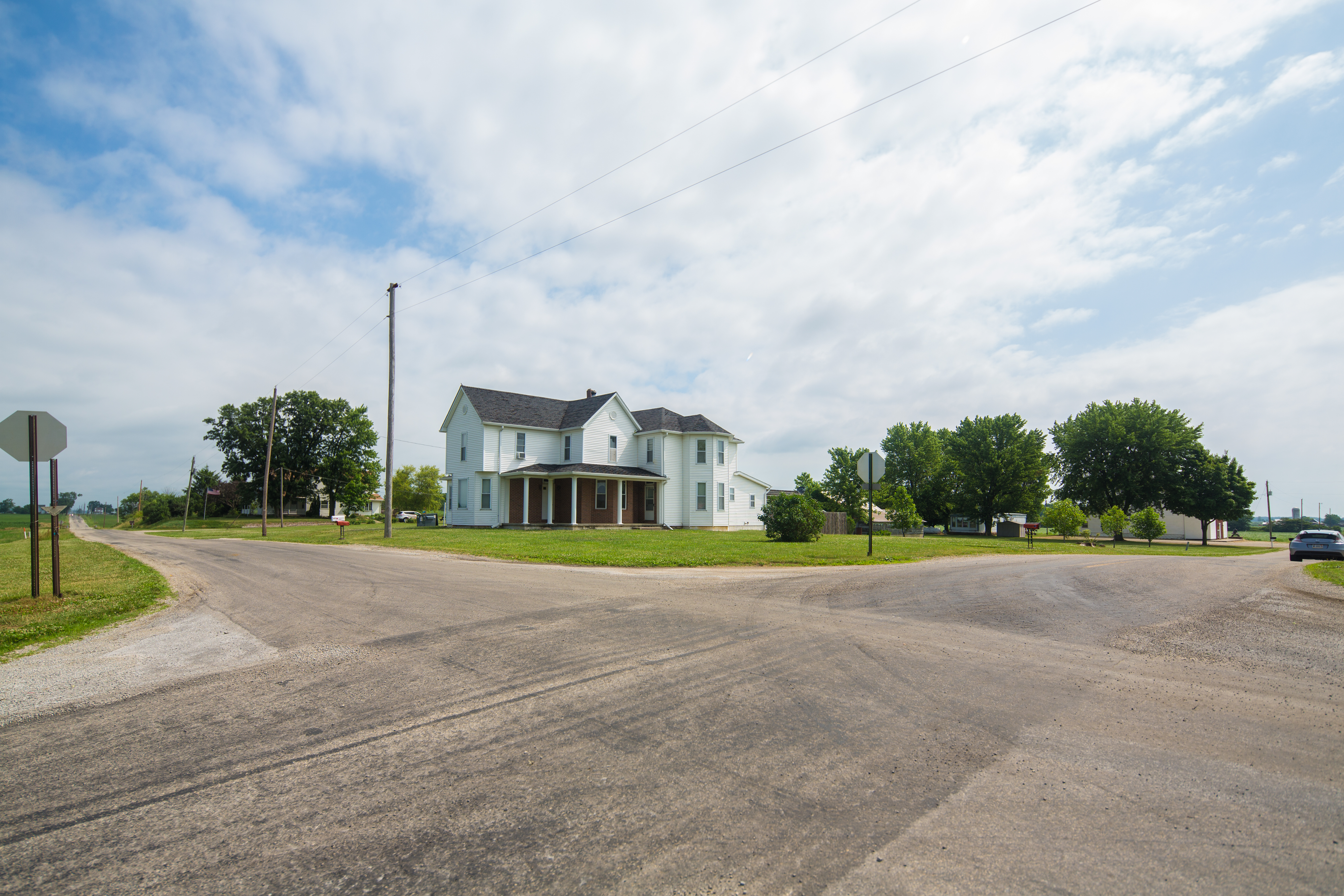
- Domestic, Indiana

- Wells County's location in Indiana

- Location of Domestic in Wells County
- Coordinates: 40°36′42″N 85°05′19″W
- Country: United States
- State: Indiana
- County: Wells
- Township: Nottingham
- Elevation: 860 ft (260 m)
- Time zone: UTC-5 (Eastern (EST))
  - Summer (DST): UTC-4 (EDT)
- ZIP code: 46740
- GNIS feature ID: 433621

Domestic is an unincorporated community in Nottingham Township, Wells County, in the U.S. state of Indiana.

== History ==
A post office was established at Domestic in 1884, and remained in operation until 1905. An old variant name of the community was called Ringville.
