= Phenix, Indiana =

- Unincorporated community
- Wells County's location in Indiana

- Location of Phenix in Wells County
- Coordinates: 40°34′55″N 85°06′26″W
- Country: United States
- State: Indiana
- County: Wells
- Township: Nottingham
- Elevation: 873 ft (266 m)
- Time zone: UTC-5 (Eastern (EST))
  - Summer (DST): UTC-4 (EDT)
- ZIP code: 46759
- GNIS feature ID: 441076

Phenix is an unincorporated community in Nottingham Township, Wells County, in the U.S. state of Indiana.

== History ==
A post office was established at Phenix in 1889, and remained in operation until it was discontinued in 1904.
