= Tocsin, Indiana =

- Unincorporated community and Census-designated place
- Wells County's location in Indiana

- Location of Tocsin in Wells County
- Coordinates: 40°49′51″N 85°06′29″W
- Country: United States
- State: Indiana
- County: Wells
- Township: Lancaster
- Elevation: 833 ft (254 m)
- Time zone: UTC-5 (Eastern (EST))
  - Summer (DST): UTC-4 (EDT)
- ZIP code: 46777
- Area code: 260
- FIPS code: 18-76076
- GNIS feature ID: 2830583

Tocsin is an unincorporated community in Lancaster Township, Wells County, in the U.S. state of Indiana. It is on the border with Jefferson Township.

== History ==
Tocsin was platted in 1884. A post office was established at Tocsin in 1882, and remained in operation until it was discontinued in 1966.

== Demographics ==
Historical population
Census	Pop.	Note	%±
2023 (est.)	269

The United States Census Bureau defined Tocsin as a census designated place in the 2022 American Community Survey.
