= Poneto, Indiana =

- Town
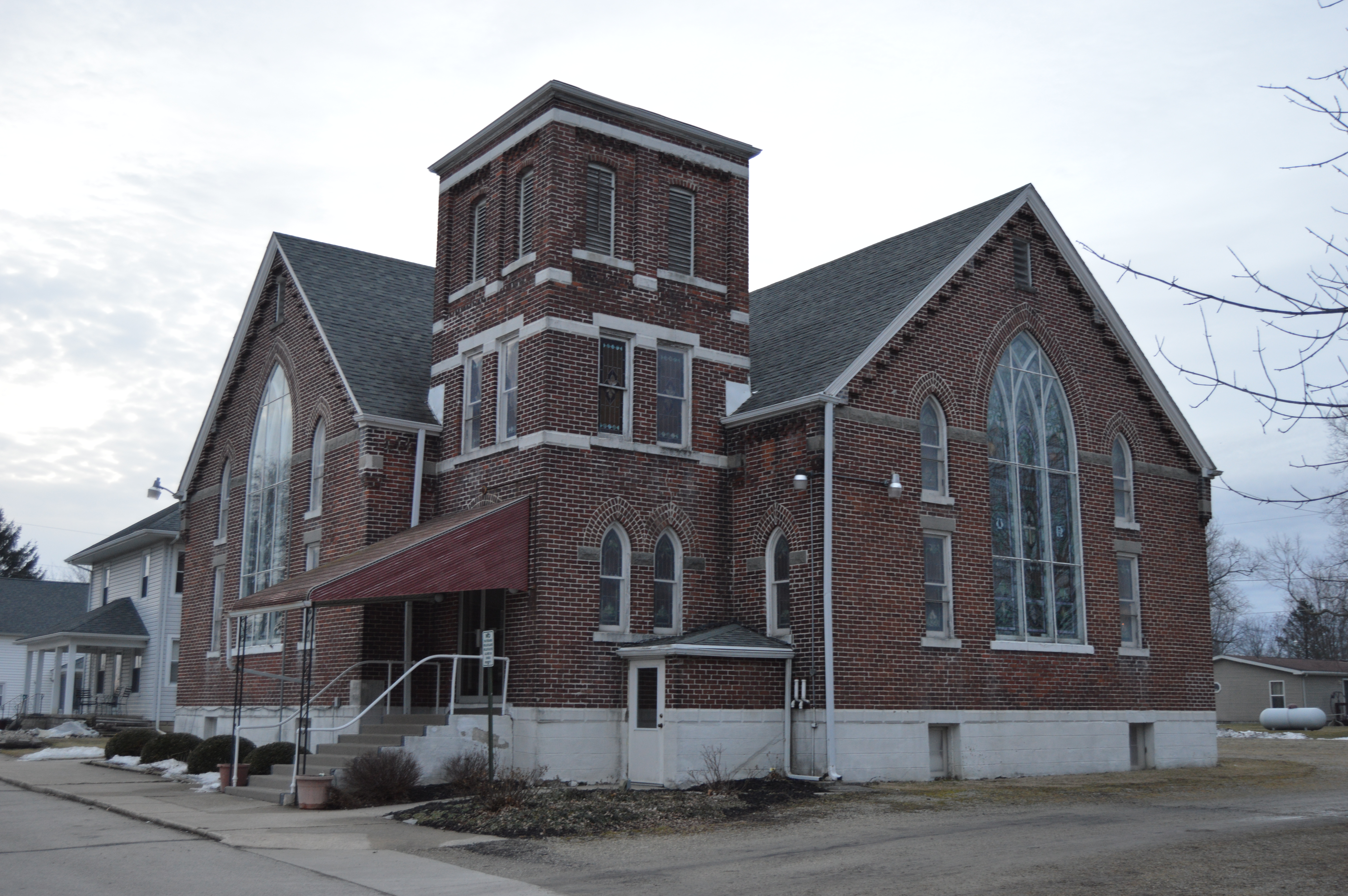
- Methodist church on Walnut St.

- Location of Poneto in Wells County, Indiana.
- Coordinates: 40°39′24″N 85°13′21″W
- Country: United States
- State: Indiana
- County: Wells
- Township: Chester, Harrison, Liberty

Area
  - Total: 0.12 sq mi (0.30 km^{2})
  - Land: 0.12 sq mi (0.30 km^{2})
  - Water: 0 sq mi (0.00 km^{2})
- Elevation: 850 ft (260 m)

Population (2020)
  - Total: 173
  - Density: 1,508.0/sq mi (582.24/km^{2})
- Time zone: UTC−05:00 (Eastern (EST))
  - Summer (DST): UTC−04:00 (EDT)
- ZIP code: 46781
- Area code: 260
- FIPS code: 18-61020
- GNIS feature ID: 2396862

Poneto is a town in Chester, Harrison and Liberty townships, Wells County, in the U.S. state of Indiana. The population was 173 at the 2020 census.

== History ==
Poneto was originally known as Worthington, and under the latter name was platted in 1871. The name Poneto was likely chosen by its residents for its uniqueness, as there was no other town in the country with the name. The post office at Poneto has been in operation since 1881.

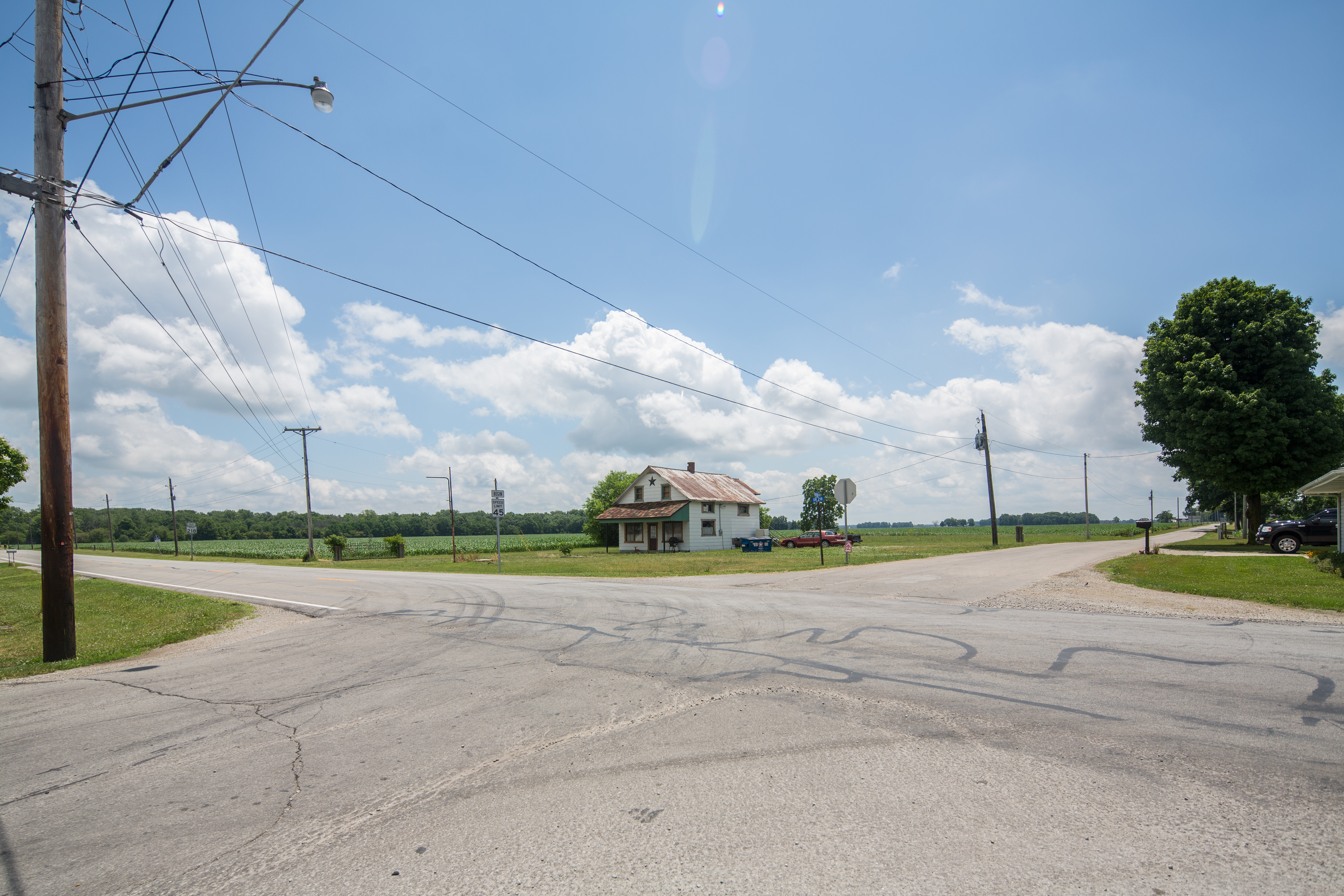
Photo from Small Town Indiana photo survey.

== Geography ==
According to the 2010 census, the town has a total area of 0.12 square miles (0.31 km^{2}), all land.

== Demographics ==
Historical population
Census	Pop.	Note	%±
1900	332		—
1910	308		−7.2%
1920	270		−12.3%
1930	237		−12.2%
1940	270		13.9%
1950	244		−9.6%
1960	289		18.4%
1970	286		−1.0%
1980	250		−12.6%
1990	236		−5.6%
2000	240		1.7%
2010	166		−30.8%
2020	173		4.2%
U.S. Decennial Census

=== 2010 census ===
As of the census of 2010, there were 166 people, 69 households, and 39 families living in the town. The population density was 1,383.3 inhabitants per square mile (534.1/km^{2}). There were 77 housing units at an average density of 641.7 per square mile (247.8/km^{2}). The racial makeup of the town was 99.4% White and 0.6% Native American. Hispanic or Latino of any race were 1.8% of the population.

There were 69 households, of which 29.0% had children under the age of 18 living with them, 49.3% were married couples living together, 4.3% had a female householder with no husband present, 2.9% had a male householder with no wife present, and 43.5% were non-families. 33.3% of all households were made up of individuals, and 10.1% had someone living alone who was 65 years of age or older. The average household size was 2.41 and the average family size was 3.08.

The median age in the town was 41.6 years. 20.5% of residents were under the age of 18; 9.5% were between the ages of 18 and 24; 25.2% were from 25 to 44; 30.7% were from 45 to 64; and 13.9% were 65 years of age or older. The gender makeup of the town was 48.2% male and 51.8% female.

=== 2000 census ===
As of the census of 2000, there were 240 people, 78 households, and 64 families living in the town. The population density was 2,078.5 inhabitants per square mile (802.5/km^{2}). There were 82 housing units at an average density of 710.1 per square mile (274.2/km^{2}). The racial makeup of the town was 100.00% White.

There were 78 households, out of which 39.7% had children under the age of 18 living with them, 74.4% were married couples living together, 2.6% had a female householder with no husband present, and 16.7% were non-families. 15.4% of all households were made up of individuals, and 10.3% had someone living alone who was 65 years of age or older. The average household size was 3.08 and the average family size was 3.45.

In the town, the population was spread out, with 33.3% under the age of 18, 10.4% from 18 to 24, 29.6% from 25 to 44, 19.2% from 45 to 64, and 7.5% who were 65 years of age or older. The median age was 30 years. For every 100 females there were 112.4 males. For every 100 females age 18 and over, there were 97.5 males.

The median income for a household in the town was $43,125, and the median income for a family was $46,750. Males had a median income of $32,125 versus $19,286 for females. The per capita income for the town was $15,820. About 3.3% of families and 5.2% of the population were below the poverty line, including 6.3% of those under the age of eighteen and 20.0% of those 65 or over.
