= Wellsburg, Indiana =

- Unincorporated community
- Wells County's location in Indiana

- Location of Wellsburg in Wells County
- Coordinates: 40°39′58″N 85°13′18″W
- Country: United States
- State: Indiana
- County: Wells
- Township: Liberty
- Elevation: 846 ft (258 m)
- Time zone: UTC-5 (Eastern (EST))
  - Summer (DST): UTC-4 (EDT)
- ZIP code: 46714
- Area code: 260
- GNIS feature ID: 445670

Wellsburg is an unincorporated community in Liberty Township, Wells County, in the U.S. state of Indiana.

== History ==
A post office was established at Wellsburg in 1870, and remained in operation until 1873.
