= Craigville, Indiana =

- Unincorporated community and Census-designated place
- Wells County's location in Indiana

- Location of Craigville in Wells County
- Coordinates: 40°46′38″N 85°05′29″W
- Country: United States
- State: Indiana
- County: Wells
- Township: Lancaster
- Elevation: 850 ft (260 m)
- Time zone: UTC-5 (Eastern (EST))
  - Summer (DST): UTC-4 (EDT)
- ZIP code: 46731
- Area code: 260
- FIPS code: 18-15616
- GNIS feature ID: 2830579

Craigville is an unincorporated community in Lancaster Township, Wells County, in the U.S. state of Indiana.

== History ==
Craigville was named after William J. Craig, a county clerk. The Craigville post office has been in operation since 1879.

== Demographics ==
The United States Census Bureau delineated Craigville as a census designated place in the 2022 American Community Survey.
