= Reiffsburg, Indiana =

- Unincorporated community
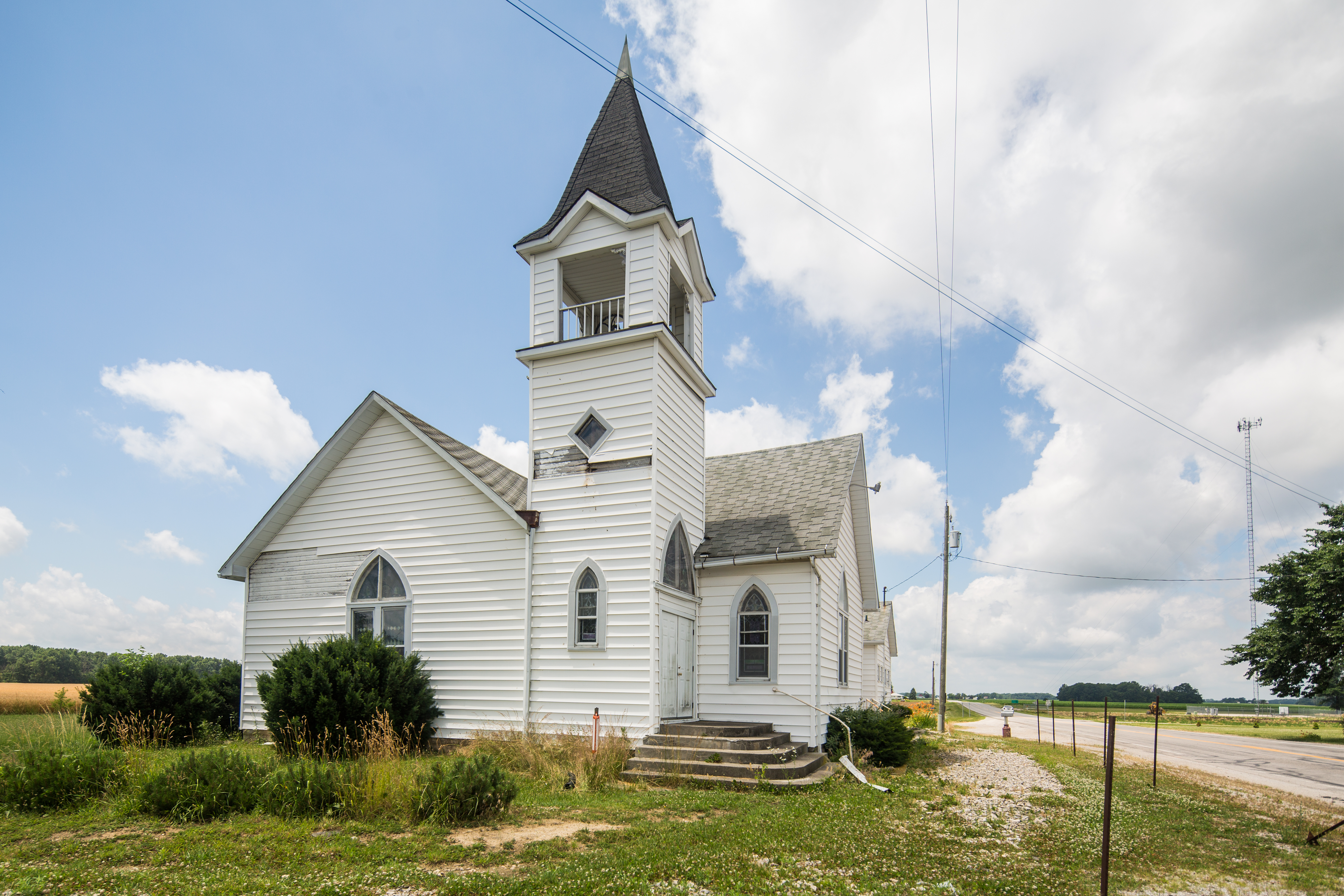
- Former Methodist church

- Location within Wells County, Indiana
- Coordinates: 40°39′21″N 85°09′07″W
- Country: United States
- State: Indiana
- County: Wells
- Township: Harrison
- Elevation: 846 ft (258 m)
- Time zone: UTC-5 (Eastern (EST))
  - Summer (DST): UTC-4 (EDT)
- ZIP code: 46714
- Area code: 260
- FIPS code: 18-63738
- GNIS feature ID: 449715

Reiffsburg is an unincorporated community in Harrison Township, Wells County, in the U.S. state of Indiana.

== History ==
Reiffsburg was named after John Reiff, who platted the community.

A post office was established at Reiffsburg in 1854, and remained in operation until it was discontinued in 1905.
