= Wells County, Indiana =

County in Indiana, United States

- County
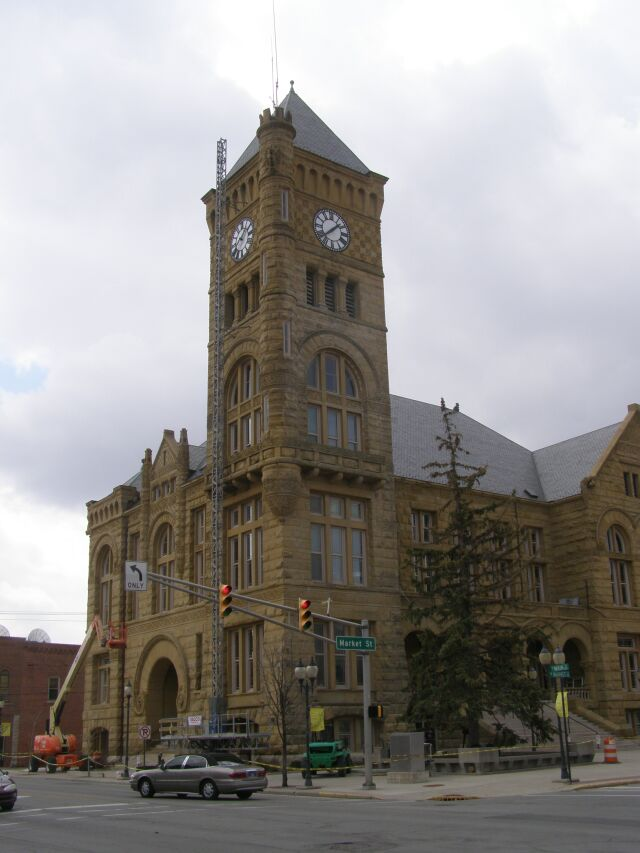
- Wells County Courthouse in Bluffton

- Location within the U.S. state of Indiana
- Coordinates: 40°44′N 85°13′W
- Country: United States
- State: Indiana
- Founded: 1837
- Named for: William A. Wells
- Seat: Bluffton
- Largest city: Bluffton

Area
  - Total: 370.25 sq mi (958.9 km^{2})
  - Land: 368.09 sq mi (953.3 km^{2})
  - Water: 2.16 sq mi (5.6 km^{2}) 0.58%

Population (2020)
  - Total: 28,180
  - Estimate (2025): 28,883 ▲
  - Density: 76.56/sq mi (29.56/km^{2})
- Time zone: UTC−5 (Eastern)
  - Summer (DST): UTC−4 (EDT)
- Congressional district: 3rd
- Website: www.wellscounty.org
- Indiana county number 90

Wells County is a county in the U.S. state of Indiana. As of the 2020 United States census, the population was 28,180. Its seat of government is Bluffton. Wells County is included in the Fort Wayne Metropolitan Statistical Area and the Fort Wayne—Huntington—Auburn Combined Statistical Area.

== History ==
The Territory of Indiana was established in 1800 as legitimized by the Northwest Ordinance of 1787. The governing structure established through this act began creating counties in the territory as it became increasingly populated. In December 1816, the State of Indiana was admitted to the Union. Wells was named after famous frontiersmen William A. Wells who played a central role in the Northwest Indian Wars and the activity surrounding Fort Miami and Kekionga. It was initially assigned to Allen County for legislative and administrative affairs.

In the winter of 1835, Col. John Vowter of Jennings County, Chairman of the Committee on New Counties, introduced a bill proposing that the assembly "lay out all the unorganized territory to which the Indian title had been extinguished in the state into a suitable number of counties". This bill would be approved later that year on February 7, effectively creating thirteen Northern Indiana counties, one of which was Wells.

On February 2, 1837, an act was passed by the state, authorizing Wells County to be organized independent of Allen County, and specifying May 1 for the date of the first meeting. However, that meeting did not take place, and so an act dated January 20, 1838, authorized the meeting of appointed commissioners to decide on a county seat. That vote was completed on March 5, 1838, selecting Bluffton.

== Geography ==
The Wabash River flows to the northwest, draining the central and upper part of the county, while the lower part is drained by the Salamonie River, also flowing to the northwest. The highest point on the terrain (935 feet/285 meters ASL) is an isolated rise on the county's south borderline with Jay County, one-half mile (0.8 km) east of the NE corner of Blackford County.

According to the 2010 census, the county has a total area of 370.25 square miles (958.9 km^{2}), of which 368.09 square miles (953.3 km^{2}) (or 99.42%) is land and 2.16 square miles (5.6 km^{2}) (or 0.58%) is water.

=== Adjacent counties ===
- Allen County - north
- Adams County - east
- Jay County - southeast
- Blackford County - south
- Grant County - west
- Huntington County - northwest

=== City and towns ===
- Bluffton (city/county seat)
- Markle (town; partly in Huntington County)
- Ossian (town)
- Poneto (town - named Worthington from 1871 to 1881)
- Uniondale (town)
- Vera Cruz (town)
- Zanesville (town; partly in Allen County)

=== Unincorporated communities ===
- Craigville
- Curryville
- Dillman
- Domestic
- Five Points
- Greenville
- Greenwood
- Keystone
- Kingsland
- Liberty Center
- McNatts
- Mount Zion
- Murray
- North Oaks
- Nottingham
- Petroleum
- Phenix
- Reiffsburg
- Riverside
- Rockford
- Tocsin
- Toll Gate Heights
- Travisville
- Wellsburg

=== Townships ===
- Chester
- Harrison
- Jackson
- Jefferson
- Lancaster
- Liberty
- Nottingham
- Rockcreek
- Union

=== Major highways ===
- Interstate 69
- U.S. Route 224
- State Road 1
- State Road 3
- State Road 116
- State Road 124
- State Road 201
- State Road 218
- State Road 301

== Demographics ==
Historical population
Census	Pop.	Note	%±
1840	1,822		—
1850	6,152		237.7%
1860	10,844		76.3%
1870	13,585		25.3%
1880	18,442		35.8%
1890	21,514		16.7%
1900	23,449		9.0%
1910	22,418		−4.4%
1920	20,509		−8.5%
1930	18,411		−10.2%
1940	19,099		3.7%
1950	19,564		2.4%
1960	21,220		8.5%
1970	23,821		12.3%
1980	25,401		6.6%
1990	25,948		2.2%
2000	27,600		6.4%
2010	27,636		0.1%
2020	28,180		2.0%
2025 (est.)	28,883	▲	2.5%
US Decennial Census; 1790-1960 1900-1990 1990-2000 2010-2013 2018 2020

=== Racial and ethnic composition ===
Wells County, Indiana – Racial and ethnic composition Note: the US Census treats Hispanic/Latino as an ethnic category. This table excludes Latinos from the racial categories and assigns them to a separate category. Hispanics/Latinos may be of any race.
Race / Ethnicity (NH = Non-Hispanic)	Pop 1980	Pop 1990	Pop 2000	Pop 2010	Pop 2020	% 1980	% 1990	% 2000	% 2010	% 2020
White alone (NH)	25,139	25,591	26,884	26,604	26,000	98.97%	98.62%	97.41%	96.27%	92.26%
Black or African American alone (NH)	4	10	41	89	220	0.02%	0.04%	0.15%	0.32%	0.78%
Native American or Alaska Native alone (NH)	16	40	43	71	50	0.06%	0.15%	0.16%	0.26%	0.18%
Asian alone (NH)	25	40	56	102	130	0.10%	0.15%	0.20%	0.37%	0.46%
Native Hawaiian or Pacific Islander alone (NH)	x	x	7	3	5	x	x	0.03%	0.01%	0.02%
Other race alone (NH)	6	5	4	4	40	0.02%	0.02%	0.01%	0.01%	0.14%
Mixed race or Multiracial (NH)	x	x	168	199	716	x	x	0.61%	0.72%	2.54%
Hispanic or Latino (any race)	211	262	397	564	1,019	0.83%	1.01%	1.44%	2.04%	3.62%
Total	25,401	25,948	27,600	27,636	28,180	100.00%	100.00%	100.00%	100.00%	100.00%

=== 2020 census ===
As of the 2020 census, the county had a population of 28,180. The median age was 41.1 years. 24.2% of residents were under the age of 18 and 19.3% of residents were 65 years of age or older. For every 100 females there were 98.2 males, and for every 100 females age 18 and over there were 95.4 males age 18 and over.

The racial makeup of the county was 93.4% White, 0.8% Black or African American, 0.3% American Indian and Alaska Native, 0.5% Asian, <0.1% Native Hawaiian and Pacific Islander, 1.1% from some other race, and 3.9% from two or more races. Hispanic or Latino residents of any race comprised 3.6% of the population.

36.7% of residents lived in urban areas, while 63.3% lived in rural areas.

There were 11,134 households in the county, of which 30.2% had children under the age of 18 living in them. Of all households, 55.0% were married-couple households, 16.7% were households with a male householder and no spouse or partner present, and 22.3% were households with a female householder and no spouse or partner present. About 26.8% of all households were made up of individuals and 12.4% had someone living alone who was 65 years of age or older.

There were 11,938 housing units, of which 6.7% were vacant. Among occupied housing units, 77.7% were owner-occupied and 22.3% were renter-occupied. The homeowner vacancy rate was 1.3% and the rental vacancy rate was 10.3%.

=== 2010 census ===
As of the 2010 United States census, there were 27,636 people, 10,780 households, and 7,684 families in the county. The population density was 75.1 inhabitants per square mile (29.0/km^{2}). There were 11,659 housing units at an average density of 31.7 per square mile (12.2/km^{2}). The racial makeup of the county was 97.3% white, 0.4% Asian, 0.3% American Indian, 0.3% black or African American, 0.8% from other races, and 0.9% from two or more races. Those of Hispanic or Latino origin made up 2.0% of the population. In terms of ancestry, 38.4% were German, 12.3% were English, 10.8% were Irish, and 10.3% were American. Of the 10,780 households, 33.1% had children under the age of 18 living with them, 58.1% were married couples living together, 8.6% had a female householder with no husband present, 28.7% were non-families, and 24.8% of all households were made up of individuals. The average household size was 2.52 and the average family size was 3.00. The median age was 40.2 years.

The median income for a household in the county was $47,697 and the median income for a family was $56,885. Males had a median income of $41,871 versus $30,031 for females. The per capita income for the county was $23,169. About 6.2% of families and 8.0% of the population were below the poverty line, including 10.8% of those under age 18 and 3.6% of those age 65 or over.

== Climate and weather ==
Bluffton, Indiana

Climate chart (precipitation, max. and min. temperature)
J	F	M	A	M	J	J	A	S	O	N	D
2 30 16	1.8 34 19	2.6 46 29	3.2 58 40	4.1 70 51	3.9 80 61	3.9 84 64	3.7 81 62	3.1 75 55	2.5 63 42	3 48 33	2.7 35 23
- █ Average max. and min. temperatures in °F
- █ Precipitation totals in inches
- Source: The Weather Channel
Metric conversion
J	F	M	A	M	J	J	A	S	O	N	D
51 −1 −9	46 1 −7	66 8 −2	82 14 4	104 21 11	100 27 16	99 29 18	94 27 17	78 24 13	64 17 6	77 9 1	67 2 −5
- █ Average max. and min. temperatures in °C
- █ Precipitation totals in mm

In recent years, average temperatures in Bluffton have ranged from a low of 16 °F (−9 °C) in January to a high of 84 °F (29 °C) in July, although a record low of −24 °F (−31 °C) was recorded in January 1985 and a record high of 104 °F (40 °C) was recorded in July 1980. Average monthly precipitation ranged from 1.83 inches (46 mm) in February to 4.11 inches (104 mm) in May.

== Government ==
The county government is a constitutional body, and is granted specific powers by the Constitution of Indiana, and by the Indiana Code.

County Council: The legislative branch of the county government; controls spending and revenue collection in the county. Representatives are elected to four-year terms from county districts. They set salaries, the annual budget, and special spending. The council has limited authority to impose local taxes, in the form of an income and property tax that is subject to state level approval, excise taxes, and service taxes.

Board of Commissioners: The executive body of the county; commissioners are elected county-wide to staggered four-year terms. One commissioner serves as president. While another will serve as Vice President of the Board. One member will serves as just a member. There is a total of three commissioners. The commissioners execute acts legislated by the council, collect revenue, and manage the county government.

Court: The county maintains a small claims court that handles civil cases. The judge on the court is elected to a term of four years. The judge is assisted by a constable who is also elected to a four-year term. In some cases, court decisions can be appealed to the state level circuit court.

County Officials: The county has other elected offices, including sheriff, coroner, auditor, treasurer, recorder, surveyor, and circuit court clerk. The officers are elected to four-year terms. Members elected to county government positions are required to declare party affiliations and to be residents of the county.

United States presidential election results for Wells County, Indiana
Year	Republican		Democratic		Third party(ies)	
Year	No.	%	No.	%	No.	%
1888	1,926	37.17%	2,942	56.77%	314	6.06%
1892	1,668	33.90%	2,725	55.37%	528	10.73%
1896	2,212	36.63%	3,728	61.74%	98	1.62%
1900	2,290	37.50%	3,599	58.94%	217	3.55%
1904	2,565	40.74%	3,127	49.67%	604	9.59%
1908	2,185	35.92%	3,345	54.99%	553	9.09%
1912	812	15.95%	2,760	54.20%	1,520	29.85%
1916	1,947	37.26%	2,928	56.03%	351	6.72%
1920	4,430	47.61%	4,653	50.01%	222	2.39%
1924	3,932	44.92%	4,537	51.83%	285	3.26%
1928	4,142	48.93%	4,246	50.16%	77	0.91%
1932	3,073	32.25%	6,236	65.45%	219	2.30%
1936	3,606	36.59%	6,189	62.81%	59	0.60%
1940	4,898	47.75%	5,236	51.05%	123	1.20%
1944	4,708	50.03%	4,475	47.56%	227	2.41%
1948	4,288	47.15%	4,726	51.97%	80	0.88%
1952	5,380	55.85%	3,963	41.14%	290	3.01%
1956	5,703	58.32%	3,984	40.74%	91	0.93%
1960	6,034	58.91%	4,128	40.30%	80	0.78%
1964	4,018	39.96%	5,945	59.12%	92	0.91%
1968	5,361	53.07%	3,827	37.89%	913	9.04%
1972	6,425	65.77%	3,244	33.21%	100	1.02%
1976	5,596	56.33%	4,250	42.78%	88	0.89%
1980	5,864	56.14%	3,760	36.00%	821	7.86%
1984	7,579	69.40%	3,274	29.98%	67	0.61%
1988	7,712	68.93%	3,437	30.72%	39	0.35%
1992	5,799	48.17%	3,282	27.26%	2,958	24.57%
1996	6,322	55.98%	3,752	33.22%	1,220	10.80%
2000	7,755	68.74%	3,319	29.42%	207	1.83%
2004	9,168	74.21%	3,112	25.19%	74	0.60%
2008	8,504	64.98%	4,403	33.64%	181	1.38%
2012	9,256	71.46%	3,436	26.53%	260	2.01%
2016	10,005	75.30%	2,586	19.46%	695	5.23%
2020	10,855	77.10%	2,928	20.80%	297	2.11%
2024	11,006	77.86%	2,850	20.16%	280	1.98%

== Education ==
School districts include Bluffton-Harrison Metropolitan School District, Northern Wells Community Schools, and Southern Wells Community Schools.

== See also ==
- National Register of Historic Places listings in Wells County, Indiana
