= Markle, Indiana =

- Town
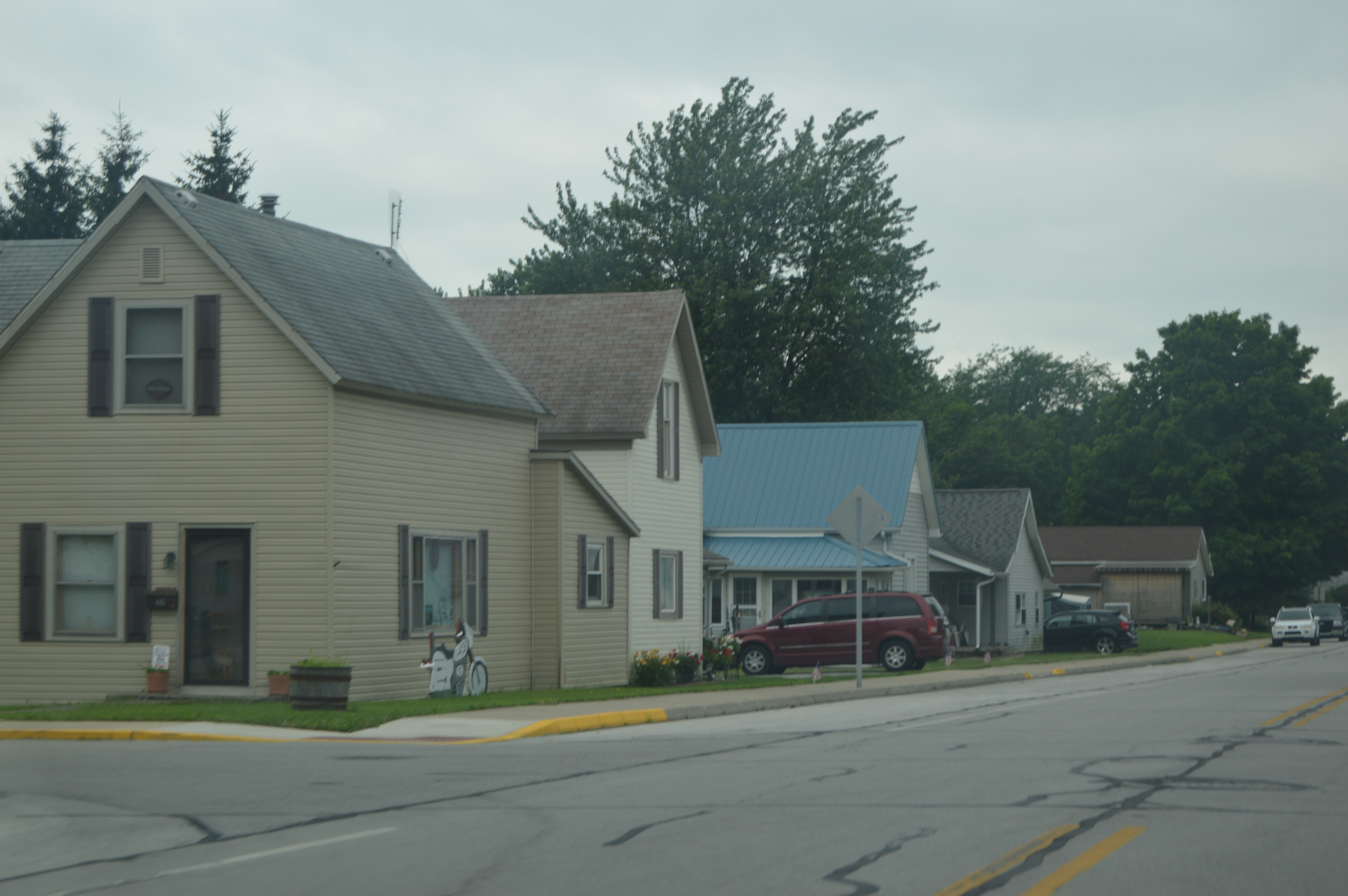
- Logan Street residential area

- Location of Markle in Huntington County and Wells County, Indiana.
- Coordinates: 40°49′45″N 85°20′28″W
- Country: United States
- State: Indiana
- Counties: Huntington, Wells
- Township: Rock Creek (Huntington County), Union (Huntington County), Rockcreek (Wells County), Union (Wells County)

Area
  - Total: 1.42 sq mi (3.69 km^{2})
  - Land: 1.37 sq mi (3.56 km^{2})
  - Water: 0.054 sq mi (0.14 km^{2})
- Elevation: 807 ft (246 m)

Population (2020)
  - Total: 1,071
  - Density: 780.0/sq mi (301.16/km^{2})
- Time zone: UTC-5 (Eastern (EST))
  - Summer (DST): UTC-4 (EDT)
- ZIP code: 46770
- Area code: 260
- FIPS code: 18-47160
- GNIS feature ID: 2396736
- Website: www.markleindiana.com

Markle is a town in Huntington and Wells counties, in the U.S. state of Indiana. The population was 1,071 at the 2020 census. It lies along Interstate 69, U.S. Route 224, State Road 116 and State Road 3.

== History ==
Markle was laid out in 1836, but did not grow considerably until the railroad was extended to that point some time later.

The Markle post office has been in operation since 1852.

== Geography ==
Markle is located at 40°49′35″N 85°20′17″W (40.826477, -85.338076). The Wabash River flows through the south edge of the town.

According to the 2010 census, Markle has a total area of 1.27 square miles (3.29 km^{2}), of which 1.22 square miles (3.16 km^{2}) (or 96.06%) is land and 0.05 square miles (0.13 km^{2}) (or 3.94%) is water.

== Demographics ==
Historical population
Census	Pop.	Note	%±
1880	220		—
1890	670		204.5%
1900	729		8.8%
1910	820		12.5%
1920	717		−12.6%
1930	621		−13.4%
1940	671		8.1%
1950	733		9.2%
1960	789		7.6%
1970	963		22.1%
1980	975		1.2%
1990	1,208		23.9%
2000	1,102		−8.8%
2010	1,095		−0.6%
2020	1,071		−2.2%
U.S. Decennial Census

=== 2020 census ===
As of the 2020 census, Markle had a population of 1,071. The median age was 44.6 years. 20.4% of residents were under the age of 18 and 23.4% of residents were 65 years of age or older. For every 100 females there were 90.6 males, and for every 100 females age 18 and over there were 88.9 males age 18 and over.

0.0% of residents lived in urban areas, while 100.0% lived in rural areas.

There were 468 households in Markle, of which 26.7% had children under the age of 18 living in them. Of all households, 43.4% were married-couple households, 21.2% were households with a male householder and no spouse or partner present, and 28.6% were households with a female householder and no spouse or partner present. About 35.6% of all households were made up of individuals and 13.2% had someone living alone who was 65 years of age or older.

There were 496 housing units, of which 5.6% were vacant. The homeowner vacancy rate was 2.4% and the rental vacancy rate was 2.7%.

Racial composition as of the 2020 census
Race	Number	Percent
White	1,002	93.6%
Black or African American	7	0.7%
American Indian and Alaska Native	3	0.3%
Asian	4	0.4%
Native Hawaiian and Other Pacific Islander	0	0.0%
Some other race	8	0.7%
Two or more races	47	4.4%
Hispanic or Latino (of any race)	15	1.4%

=== 2010 census ===
As of the census of 2010, there were 1,095 people, 433 households, and 282 families living in the town. The population density was 897.5 inhabitants per square mile (346.5/km^{2}). There were 470 housing units at an average density of 385.2 per square mile (148.7/km^{2}). The racial makeup of the town was 98.3% White, 0.8% African American, 0.2% Asian, 0.1% from other races, and 0.6% from two or more races. Hispanic or Latino of any race were 1.2% of the population.

There were 433 households, of which 29.8% had children under the age of 18 living with them, 52.7% were married couples living together, 9.0% had a female householder with no husband present, 3.5% had a male householder with no wife present, and 34.9% were non-families. 31.2% of all households were made up of individuals, and 12.3% had someone living alone who was 65 years of age or older. The average household size was 2.35 and the average family size was 2.94.

The median age in the town was 43 years. 23.1% of residents were under the age of 18; 6.9% were between the ages of 18 and 24; 22.3% were from 25 to 44; 27.7% were from 45 to 64; and 20.3% were 65 years of age or older. The gender makeup of the town was 47.9% male and 52.1% female.

=== 2000 census ===
As of the census of 2000, there were 1,102 people, 434 households, and 289 families living in the town. The population density was 1,116.3 inhabitants per square mile (431.0/km^{2}). There were 471 housing units at an average density of 477.1 per square mile (184.2/km^{2}). The racial makeup of the town was 99.27% White, 0.36% African American, and 0.36% from two or more races. Hispanic or Latino of any race were 0.64% of the population.

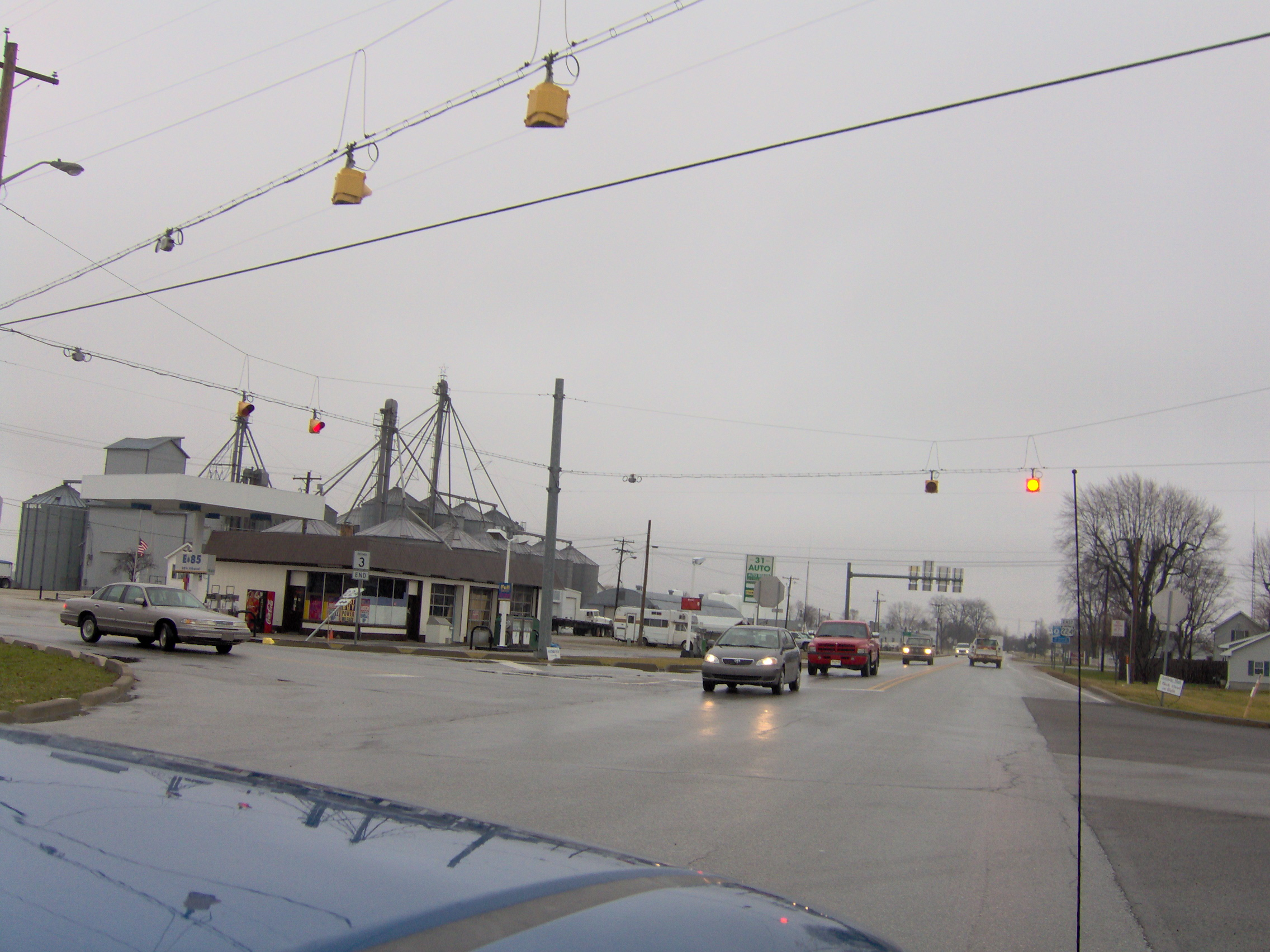
View of the intersection of State Road 3 and US 224 at Markle

There were 434 households, out of which 28.8% had children under the age of 18 living with them, 53.7% were married couples living together, 9.7% had a female householder with no husband present, and 33.4% were non-families. 28.6% of all households were made up of individuals, and 12.0% had someone living alone who was 65 years of age or older. The average household size was 2.42 and the average family size was 2.98.

In the town, the population was spread out, with 24.3% under the age of 18, 9.4% from 18 to 24, 27.4% from 25 to 44, 20.5% from 45 to 64, and 18.3% who were 65 years of age or older. The median age was 38 years. For every 100 females, there were 90.0 males. For every 100 females age 18 and over, there were 84.9 males.

The median income for a household in the town was $37,039, and the median income for a family was $48,654. Males had a median income of $35,163 versus $20,813 for females. The per capita income for the town was $18,504. About 3.6% of families and 6.7% of the population were below the poverty line, including 9.4% of those under age 18 and 3.1% of those age 65 or over.

== Education ==
Markle residents may obtain a free library card from the Huntington City-Township Public Library in Downtown Huntington.
