= Washington Township, Blackford County, Indiana =

Washington Township
- Township
- Location of Washington Township in Blackford County
- Coordinates: 40°31′05″N 85°23′40″W
- Country: United States
- State: Indiana
- County: Blackford

Government
  - Type: Indiana township

Area
  - Total: 36.23 sq mi (93.8 km^{2})
  - Land: 36.22 sq mi (93.8 km^{2})
  - Water: 0.01 sq mi (0.026 km^{2})
- Elevation: 883 ft (269 m)

Population (2020)
  - Total: 803
  - Density: 22.2/sq mi (8.56/km^{2})
- FIPS code: 18-80360
- GNIS feature ID: 453982

Washington Township is one of four townships in Blackford County, Indiana. As of the 2020 census, its population was 803 (down from 873 at 2010) and it contained 364 housing units. County Commissioners named the township after George Washington in 1833, and it was part of Jay County. In 1838, Washington Township became part of the newly organized Blackford County.

== Geography ==
According to the 2010 census, the township has a total area of 36.23 square miles (93.8 km^{2}), of which 36.22 square miles (93.8 km^{2}) (or 99.97%) is land and 0.01 square miles (0.026 km^{2}) (or 0.03%) is water.

Map of Washington Township

=== Unincorporated towns ===
- Roll
- Silas (ghost town)

=== Major highways ===
- SR 3
- SR 18

=== Cemeteries ===
The township contains at least nine cemeteries: Balsley, Center, Hadden, Herbaugh, Leffler, Mills, Roll, Shields, and Schmidt.
