= Uniondale, Indiana =

- Town
- Location of Uniondale in Wells County, Indiana.
- Coordinates: 40°49′48″N 85°14′27″W
- Country: United States
- State: Indiana
- County: Wells
- Township: Union, Rockcreek

Government
  - Type: Mayor-council government
  - Mayor: Ronald K. Sliger (R)

Area
  - Total: 0.21 sq mi (0.55 km^{2})
  - Land: 0.21 sq mi (0.54 km^{2})
  - Water: 0.0039 sq mi (0.01 km^{2})
- Elevation: 814 ft (248 m)

Population (2020)
  - Total: 271
  - Density: 1,291.3/sq mi (498.58/km^{2})
- Time zone: UTC-5 (Eastern (EST))
  - Summer (DST): UTC-4 (EDT)
- ZIP code: 46791
- Area code: 260
- FIPS code: 18-77786
- GNIS feature ID: 2397705

Uniondale is a town in Union and Rockcreek townships, Wells County, in the U.S. state of Indiana. The population was 271 at the 2020 census, down from 310 at the 2010 Census.

== History ==
Uniondale was surveyed and platted in 1882 by George C. Ditzler as a station along the Chicago and Atlantic Railway. Henry W. Lipkey and Ditzler founded Uniondale in 1882. At one point, the largest sawmill in Wells County was located in Uniondale.

The Uniondale post office has been in operation since 1886.

== Geography ==
According to the 2010 census, Uniondale has a total area of 0.212 square miles (0.55 km^{2}), of which 0.21 square miles (0.54 km^{2}) (or 99.06%) is land and 0.002 square miles (0.01 km^{2}) (or 0.94%) is water.

== Demographics ==
Historical population
Census	Pop.	Note	%±
1910	189		—
1920	257		36.0%
1930	226		−12.1%
1940	301		33.2%
1950	293		−2.7%
1960	311		6.1%
1970	349		12.2%
1980	303		−13.2%
1990	289		−4.6%
2000	277		−4.2%
2010	310		11.9%
2020	271		−12.6%
U.S. Decennial Census

=== 2010 census ===
As of the census of 2010, there were 310 people, 119 households, and 83 families living in the town. The population density was 1,476.2 inhabitants per square mile (570.0/km^{2}). There were 126 housing units at an average density of 600.0 units per square mile (231.7 units/km^{2}). The racial makeup of the town was 96.8% White, 0.3% African American, 0.3% Native American, 1.9% Asian, and 0.6% from two or more races. Hispanic or Latino of any race were 1.0% of the population.

There were 119 households, of which 34.5% had children under the age of 18 living with them, 55.5% were married couples living together, 10.1% had a female householder with no husband present, 4.2% had a male householder with no wife present, and 30.3% were non-families. 26.9% of all households were made up of individuals, and 7.5% had someone living alone who was 65 years of age or older. The average household size was 2.61 and the average family size was 3.13.

The median age in the town was 37.4 years. 25.2% of residents were under the age of 18; 12.3% were between the ages of 18 and 24; 22.6% were from 25 to 44; 27.7% were from 45 to 64; and 12.3% were 65 years of age or older. The gender makeup of the town was 49.0% male and 51.0% female.

=== 2000 census ===
As of the census of 2000, there were 277 people, 109 households, and 74 families living in the town. The population density was 1,280.9 inhabitants per square mile (494.6/km^{2}). There were 115 housing units at an average density of 531.8 units per square mile (205.3 units/km^{2}). The racial makeup of the town was 99.64% White and 0.36% Asian.

There were 109 households, out of which 35.8% had children under the age of 18 living with them, 51.4% were married couples living together, 12.8% had a female householder with no husband present, and 31.2% were non-families. 29.4% of all households were made up of individuals, and 16.5% had someone living alone who was 65 years of age or older. The average household size was 2.54 and the average family size was 3.19.

In the town, the population was spread out, with 27.8% under the age of 18, 8.3% from 18 to 24, 26.7% from 25 to 44, 20.2% from 45 to 64, and 17.0% who were 65 years of age or older. The median age was 38 years. For every 100 females, there were 99.3 males. For every 100 females age 18 and over, there were 90.5 males.

The median income for a household in the town was $40,469, and the median income for a family was $48,750. Males had a median income of $38,571 versus $22,500 for females. The per capita income for the town was $18,743. About 2.7% of families and 2.3% of the population were below the poverty line, including 5.6% of those under the age of eighteen and none of those 65 or over.
