= National Register of Historic Places listings in Huntington County, Indiana =

Location of Huntington County in Indiana

This is a list of the National Register of Historic Places listings in Huntington County, Indiana.

This is intended to be a complete list of the properties and districts on the National Register of Historic Places in Huntington County, Indiana, United States. Latitude and longitude coordinates are provided for many National Register properties and districts; these locations may be seen together in a map.

There are 22 properties and districts listed on the National Register in the county. Another two properties were once listed but have been removed.

Properties and districts located in incorporated areas display the name of the municipality, while properties and districts in unincorporated areas display the name of their civil township. Properties and districts split between multiple jurisdictions display the names of all jurisdictions.

This National Park Service list is complete through NPS recent listings posted May 22, 2026.

== Current listings ==
	Name on the Register	Image	Date listed	Location	City or town	Description
1	Chenoweth-Coulter Farm	Chenoweth-Coulter Farm	June 17, 2009 (#09000426)	7067 S. Etna Rd., northeast of La Fontaine; 40°43′29″N 85°34′04″W	Wayne Township	
2	Chief Richardville House and Miami Treaty Grounds	Chief Richardville House and Miami Treaty Grounds	September 16, 1985 (#85002446)	2 miles (3.2 km) west of downtown Huntington, southwest of the junction of U.S. Route 24 and State Roads 9/37; 40°52′37″N 85°31′58″W	Huntington and Huntington Township	
3	Drover Town Historic District	Drover Town Historic District	September 20, 2006 (#06000852)	Roughly bounded by the Little River, S. LaFontaine St., Olinger and Elm Sts., Ogan and Salamonie Ave., and Whitelock St. 40°52′39″N 85°29′38″W	Huntington	
4	German Reformed Church	German Reformed Church	April 11, 1985 (#85000724)	202 Etna Ave. 40°52′40″N 85°29′38″W	Huntington	
5	Hawley Heights Historic District	Hawley Heights Historic District	September 28, 2003 (#03000983)	Generally bounded by Oak, MacGahan, Cherry, and Collins Sts. 40°53′22″N 85°30′19″W	Huntington	
6	Hotel LaFontaine	Hotel LaFontaine	February 9, 1984 (#84001056)	200 W. State St. 40°52′52″N 85°29′42″W	Huntington	
7	Huntington Courthouse Square Historic District	Huntington Courthouse Square Historic District	September 4, 1992 (#92001163)	Roughly bounded by State, Court, and Cherry Sts., Park Dr., and the alley between Warren and Guilford Sts. 40°52′52″N 85°29′37″W	Huntington	
8	John and Minerva Kline Farm	John and Minerva Kline Farm	December 22, 1988 (#88003038)	2715 E. 400N, east of Huntington; 40°53′19″N 85°23′59″W	Union Township	
9	Memorial Park	Memorial Park	March 7, 2017 (#100000714)	1200 W. Park Dr. 40°52′44″N 85°30′32″W	Huntington	
10	Moore/Carlew Building	Moore/Carlew Building	September 1, 1983 (#83000036)	400 and 410-418 N. Jefferson St. 40°52′55″N 85°29′42″W	Huntington	
11	Mt. Hope Cemetery & Mausoleum		June 1, 2026 (#100013073)	1700 West Park Drive; 40°52′40″N 85°29′39″W	Huntington	
12	North Jefferson Street Historic District	North Jefferson Street Historic District	March 31, 2010 (#10000123)	Roughly bounded by W. Park Dr. and College, Madison, Collins, Oak, Stephen, and Buchanan Sts. 40°53′11″N 85°29′57″W	Huntington	
13	Old Plat Historic District	Old Plat Historic District	March 15, 2000 (#00000196)	Roughly bounded by Warren, John, Wilkerson, Lincoln, Washington, 2nd, and Court Sts. 40°53′01″N 85°29′32″W	Huntington	
14	David Alonzo and Elizabeth Purviance House	David Alonzo and Elizabeth Purviance House	March 17, 1994 (#94000225)	809 N. Jefferson St. 40°53′06″N 85°29′50″W	Huntington	
15	Samuel Purviance House	Samuel Purviance House	June 13, 1986 (#86001266)	326 S. Jefferson; 40°52′40″N 85°29′32″W	Huntington	
16	Rangeline Road Bridge	Rangeline Road Bridge	April 3, 1998 (#98000306)	County Road 475W over the Wabash River, west of Huntington; 40°52′45″N 85°32′34″W	Huntington Township	
17	Sunken Gardens	Sunken Gardens	June 26, 1997 (#97000596)	West Park Dr., southwest of the junction of U.S. Route 24 and La Fontaine St. 40°52′44″N 85°30′22″W	Huntington	
18	Taylor-Zent House	Taylor-Zent House	February 11, 1982 (#82000041)	715 N. Jefferson St. 40°53′04″N 85°29′50″W	Huntington	
19	Victory Noll-St. Felix Friary Historic District	Victory Noll-St. Felix Friary Historic District	December 6, 2004 (#04001311)	1900 W. Park Dr.-1280 Hitzfield St. 40°53′12″N 85°30′55″W	Huntington	
20	Warren Downtown Historic District		May 19, 2022 (#100007735)	Roughly bounded by 1st, Mathilda, 3rd, and Nancy Sts. 40°40′58″N 85°25′36″W	Warren	
21	William Street School	William Street School	June 26, 1986 (#86001390)	521 William St. 40°52′36″N 85°29′50″W	Huntington	
22	Young-Yentes-Mattern Farm	Young-Yentes-Mattern Farm	April 12, 2001 (#01000361)	Junction of Roads 900W and 400N, west of Huntington; 40°53′20″N 85°37′30″W	Dallas Township	

== Former listings ==
	Name on the Register	Image	Date listed	Date removed	Location	City or town	Description
1	Madame Margaret LaFolier House		February 19, 1982 (#82000040)	December 18, 1990	West of Huntington on U.S. Route 24	Huntington	
2	S.C. Snider and George McFeeley Polygonal Barn		April 2, 1993 (#93000185)	February 21, 2012	State Roads 9/37, 0.5 miles (0.80 km) south of their junction with Division Rd. 40°49′27″N 85°32′05″W	Huntington	

== See also ==
- List of National Historic Landmarks in Indiana
- National Register of Historic Places listings in Indiana
- Listings in neighboring counties: Allen, Grant, Wabash, Wells, Whitley
- List of Indiana state historical markers in Huntington County
