= List of Indiana state historical markers in Huntington County =

Location of Huntington County in Indiana

This is a list of the Indiana state historical markers in Huntington County.

This is intended to be a complete list of the official state historical markers placed in Huntington County, Indiana, United States by the Indiana Historical Bureau. The locations of the historical markers and their latitude and longitude coordinates are included below when available, along with their names, years of placement, and topics as recorded by the Historical Bureau. There are 12 historical markers located in Huntington County.

== Historical markers ==
Marker title	Image	Year placed	Location	Topics
Pioneer Medical Doctors/Chase S. Osborn		1949	Southeastern corner of the junction of State Roads 105 and 124, west of Mount Etna; 40°44′26″N 85°37′15″W	Science, Medicine, and Inventions, Women
Home of Chief Richardville		1966	Forks of the Wabash Historic Park at the southwestern corner of the junction of U.S. Route 24 and State Road 9 near Huntington; 40°52′39″N 85°31′58″W	American Indian/Native American
Forks of Wabash		1972	Junction of Business U.S. Route 24 and W. Park Drive east of the State Road 9 junction near Huntington; 40°52′38.2″N 85°31′50″W	American Indian/Native American, Transportation, Business, Industry, and Labor
Canal Landing on Washington Street/ Jefferson Park Mall: Indiana's First Tax-Free Mall		1973	Junction of Washington and N. Jefferson Streets in Huntington; 40°52′58″N 85°29′44″W	Transportation, Business, Industry, and Labor
Drover Town		1979	One block north of the junction of Etna Avenue and Henry Street on the property of St. Peter's First United Church of Christ in Huntington; 40°52′40″N 85°29′38″W	Historic District, Neighborhoods, and Towns, Immigration and Ethnic Groups
The "Lime City"		1979	Junction of W. Park Drive and Diamond Street at Sunken Gardens Park in Huntington; 40°52′41.7″N 85°30′24″W	Business, Industry, and Labor
Huntington's Buildings over the River: Controversy to Controversy/Huntington's Ford and First Bridge		1979	Jefferson Street bridge over the Little River in Huntington; 40°52′45.4″N 85°29′35.6″W	Buildings and Architecture, Business, Industry, and Labor, Transportation
Wabash & Erie Canal Lock 4		1997	339 E. First Street at U.S. Route 24 in Roanoke; 40°57′42.3″N 85°22′16″W	Transportation, Business, Industry, and Labor
Kiilhsoohkwa (Kilsoquah)		2005	Glenwood Cemetery in the 1000 block of N. Main Street in Roanoke; 40°58′16″N 85°22′19″W	American Indian/Native American, Women, Government Institutions, Early Settlement and Exploration
Warren's Carnegie Library		2007	123 E. Third St. in Warren; 40°41′0.6″N 85°25′32″W	Carnegie Libraries, Buildings and Architecture
Dr Otto U. King		2018	322 N. Jefferson St., Huntington; 40°52′53″N 85°29′40″W	Medicine, Education
Elizebeth Smith Friedman, 1892-1980		2021	Memorial Park, 1120 W. Park Dr. Huntington; 40°52′42″N 85°30′22″W	Women; Science, Medicine, and Invention; Education and Library; Military

== See also ==
- List of Indiana state historical markers
- National Register of Historic Places listings in Huntington County, Indiana
