= Carrie M. Shoaff =

American dramatist

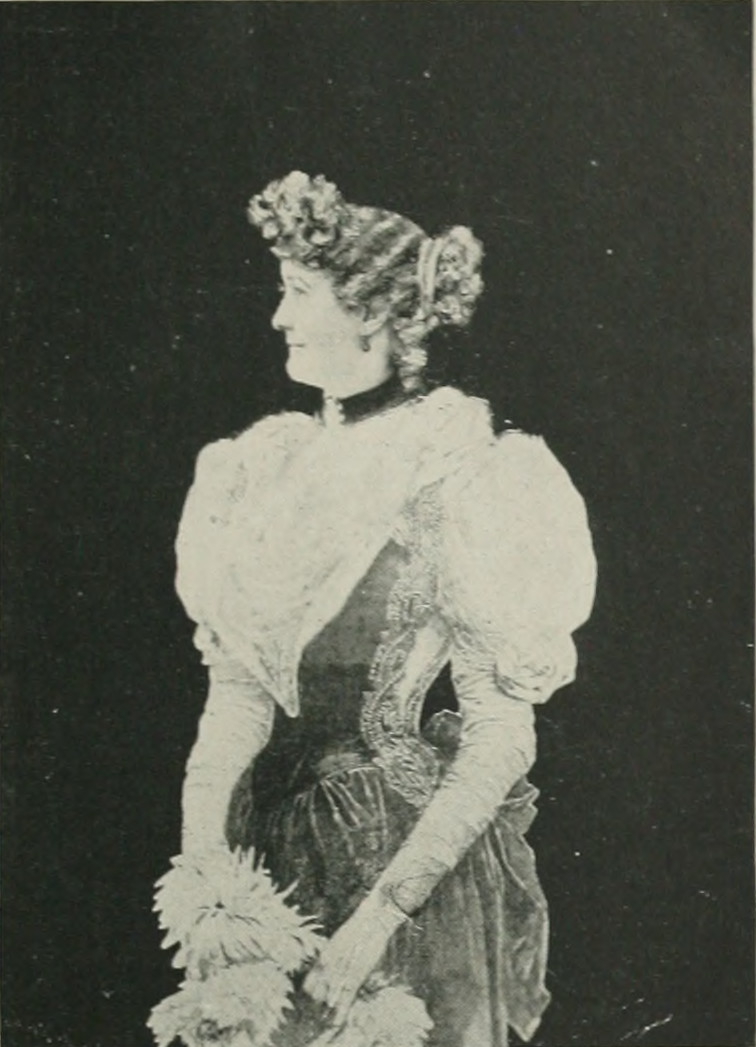
- Photo in A Woman of the Century
- Born: Carrie M. Gifford; April 2, 1849; Huntington, Indiana, U.S.
- Died: March 15, 1939 (aged 89); Fort Wayne, Indiana, U.S.
- Resting place: Lindenwood Cemetery, Fort Wayne, Indiana
- Occupations: artist; author; potter; playwright; correspondent; newspaper reporter
- Spouse: Uria S. Shoaff
- Writing career
- Language: English

Carrie M. Shoaff (née, Gifford; April 2, 1849 – March 15, 1939) was an American artist, author, potter, playwright, as well as a correspondent and newspaper reporter. Opening a new field, in which woman's ingenuity and artistic tastes found profitable employment, she was affiliated with the Fort Wayne, Indiana "Greenwich Village" artist community.

== Early life ==
Carrie M. Gifford was born in Huntington, Indiana, April 2, 1849. She developed artistic talents at an early age, learning to draw and paint.

== Career ==
After her marriage to Uria (or Urias) S. Shoaff (1846–1930), she worked in his department store, but after being discouraged from continuing this work, they relocated to Fort Wayne where she established a studio in their home's basement, turning her attention to plastic arts.

In the 1870s, Shoaff lived in the Sturtevant Hotel, New York City, serving as a correspondent, and the first woman reporter for the Fort Wayne, Indiana Gazette through her "Special Letters" in the form of interviews and other interesting stories regarding people from Fort Wayne.

Returning to Indiana, she invented a method of manufacturing imitation Limoges ware, which was utilized in the making of advertising signs, plaques and other forms. In that art, she used common clay and a glaze of her own invention, and the results were surprisingly fine. She established a school in Fort Wayne, and trained a large number of students. Many business firms gave her orders for souvenirs and advertising plaques, made of her materials and from her designs, and her reputation spread through the United States. She taught women the art of using common clay and turning out imitations of the Limoges ware that almost defied detection, even by connoisseurs. She received numerous invitations to open art schools in New York City and other large cities, but she remained in Fort Wayne, earning both fame and money. She taught her classes the art of digging, preparing and modeling their own clay, the art of ornamenting the pieces properly, and the secret of glazing the finished wares into perfect copies of the fired wares. Shoaff lived in Fort Wayne's "Greenwich Village" artist community for thirteen years, along with J. Ottis Adams, Otto Stark, and T. C. Steele. Also in Fort Wayne, she wrote the lines to a drama, The Still Alarm.

== Death ==
She died in Fort Wayne, March 15, 1939, and was buried at that city's Lindenwood Cemetery.
