= S.C. Snider and George McFeeley Polygonal Barn =

- Formerly listed on the U.S. National Register of Historic Places
- Location within Indiana Location within the United States
- Nearest city: State Roads 9/37, 0.5 miles (0.80 km) south of their junction with Division Rd., near Huntington, Indiana
- Coordinates: 40°49′27″N 85°32′5″W
- Area: less than one acre
- Built: 1906
- Built by: Snider, S.C.; McFeeley, George
- Architectural style: Twelve-sided barn
- MPS: Round and Polygonal Barns of Indiana MPS
- NRHP reference No.: 93000185

Significant dates
- Added to NRHP: April 2, 1993
- Removed from NRHP: February 21, 2012

S.C. Snider and George McFeeley Polygonal Barn, also known as the Shearer Barn, was a historic round barn located near Huntington in Huntington County, Indiana. It was built in 1906, and was a 12-sided, two-story frame barn. It had a sectional, three pitched gambrel roof topped by a cupola. It has been demolished.

It was listed on the National Register of Historic Places in 1992 and delisted in 2012.
