= Kiilhsoohkwa =

Myaamia woman and granddaughter of Minšihkinaahkwa

Kiilh-sooh-kwa
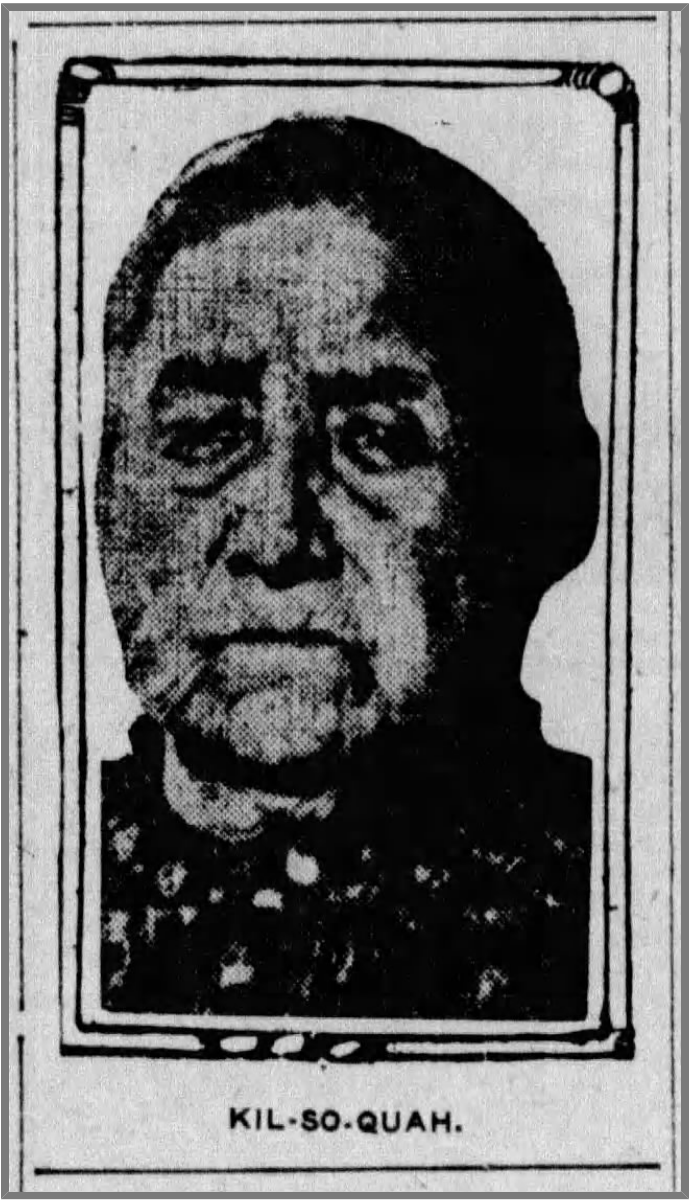
- Image of Kiilh-sooh-kwa from The Star Press (Muncie, Indiana) on 6 September 1915.
- Born: c. 1810 near Markle, Indiana, U.S.
- Died: September 4, 1915 (aged 104–105); Roanoke, Indiana, U.S.
- Resting place: Glenwood Cemetery (Roanoke, Indiana)
- Other names: Margaret Revarre
- Known for: Granddaughter of Mihšihkinaahkwa. Reportedly cared for the flag presented to her other grandfather at the Treaty of Greenville.

Kiilh-sooh-kwa (var. Kiilhsoohkwa, Kil-so-quah, Kilsoquah, Margaret Revarre) was a member of the Myaamia Nation and granddaughter of Myaamia Chief Mihšihkinaahkwa (var. Little Turtle). She was born in about 1810 and died in 1915. She was one of the few Myaamia who was not removed from Indiana in 1846.

== Early life ==
Kiilh-sooh-kwa was born in 1810 in an area she described in an interview in 1906 as near present-day Markle, Huntington County in northeast Indiana. Separate sources suggest she was born at the Forks of the Wabash, closer to present-day Huntington, Huntington County, Indiana. She was the granddaughter of Myaamia Chief Mihšihkinaahkwa (var. Little Turtle). Her father, Wok-shin-gah (var. Crescent Moon) was Mihšihkinaahkwa's son. Her mother was Nah-wah-kah-mo-kwa (var. Snow Woman).

Her first husband was John Owl, the son of Chief John Owl. In 1826, the pair wed in an area referred to as Seek's Village around the Eel River. John died within the first year or two of their marriage. In 1832, Kiilh-sooh-kwa wed Shaw-pe-nom-quah (var. Anthony Revarre), who was of half Native American, half French descent trader. Together Kiilh-sooh-kwa and Shaw-pe-nom-quah had six children, four of whom died in infancy. Her two surviving children were a son, Wa-pe-mung-quah (var. Little White Loon, Anthony Revarre, Jr.), and a daughter, Wan-nog-quan-quah (var. Snow, Mist, or Fog; Blowing Snow; Happy Fawn; Mary E. Johnson).

== Later life ==
Little is documented of her young adult life, though in 2013 she was described by the Smithsonian Institution as an important midwife in Indiana who understood and used plant knowledge related to childbirth. In her later years, she lived in Roanoke, Indiana, on forty acres of what remained of her family's and her nation's territory. She only spoke in her native language. Some sources suggesting that she understood some English. One of the few English words that she knew and used frequently was "rheumatism," given her affliction with the disease. She was described in 1905 as "a big woman, of swarthy appearance, and...a devotee of the pipe, which she has with her almost incessantly" and, separately, was described as a devout Catholic.

In 1915 a Fort Wayne-based newspaper said "if a stranger called, the old woman would grasp the hand and give a firm grip, and after looking you over would in her quaint way and feeble voice mutter a few words in her native tongue, that if interpreted would be a hearty welcome." An estimated 15,000 attendees celebrated her 100th birthday in Roanoke and her centennial was well-documented in Indiana newspapers.

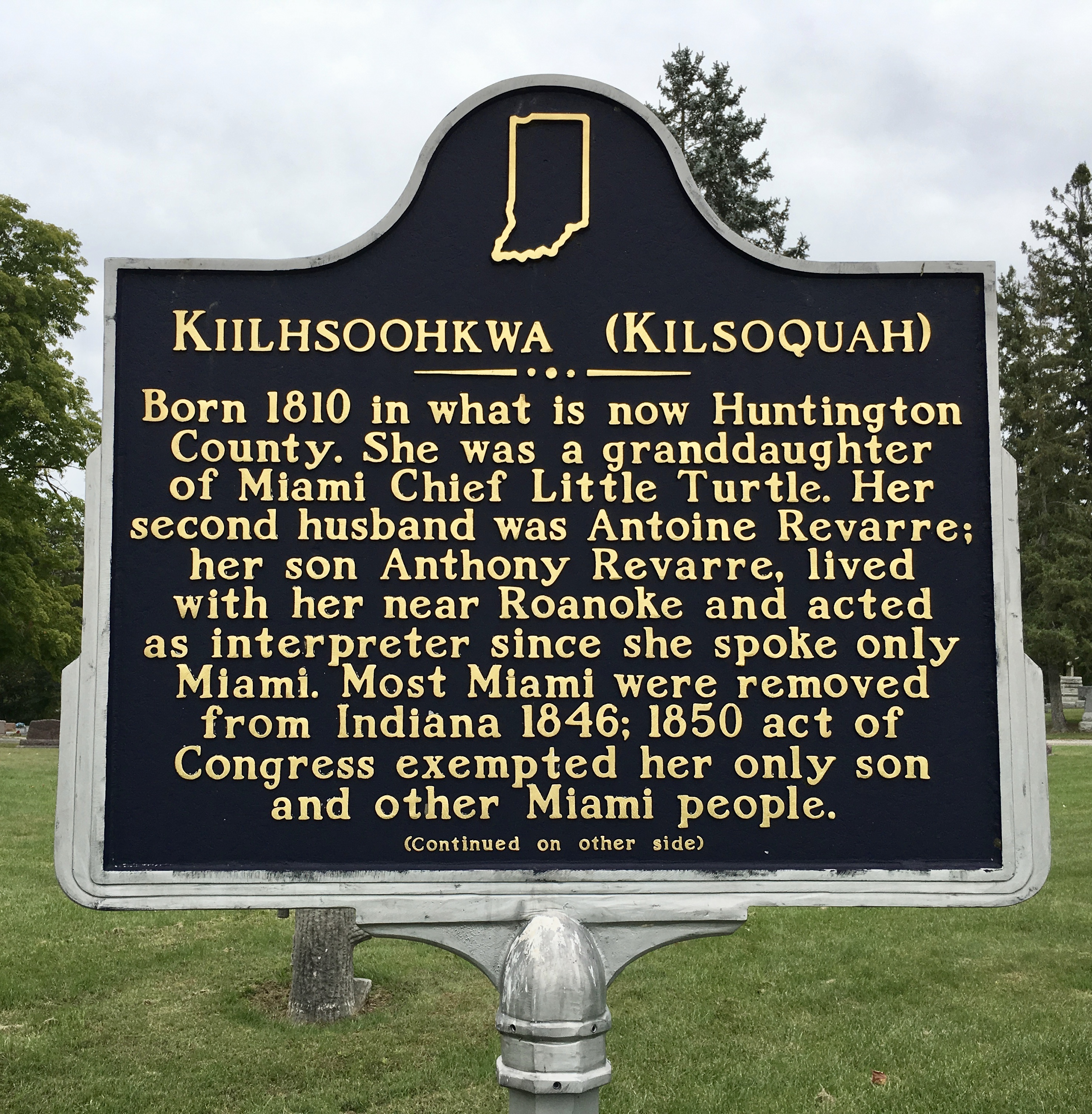
Historic sign at Glenwood Cemetery in Roanoke, IN commemorating and memorializing Kiilhsoohkwa.

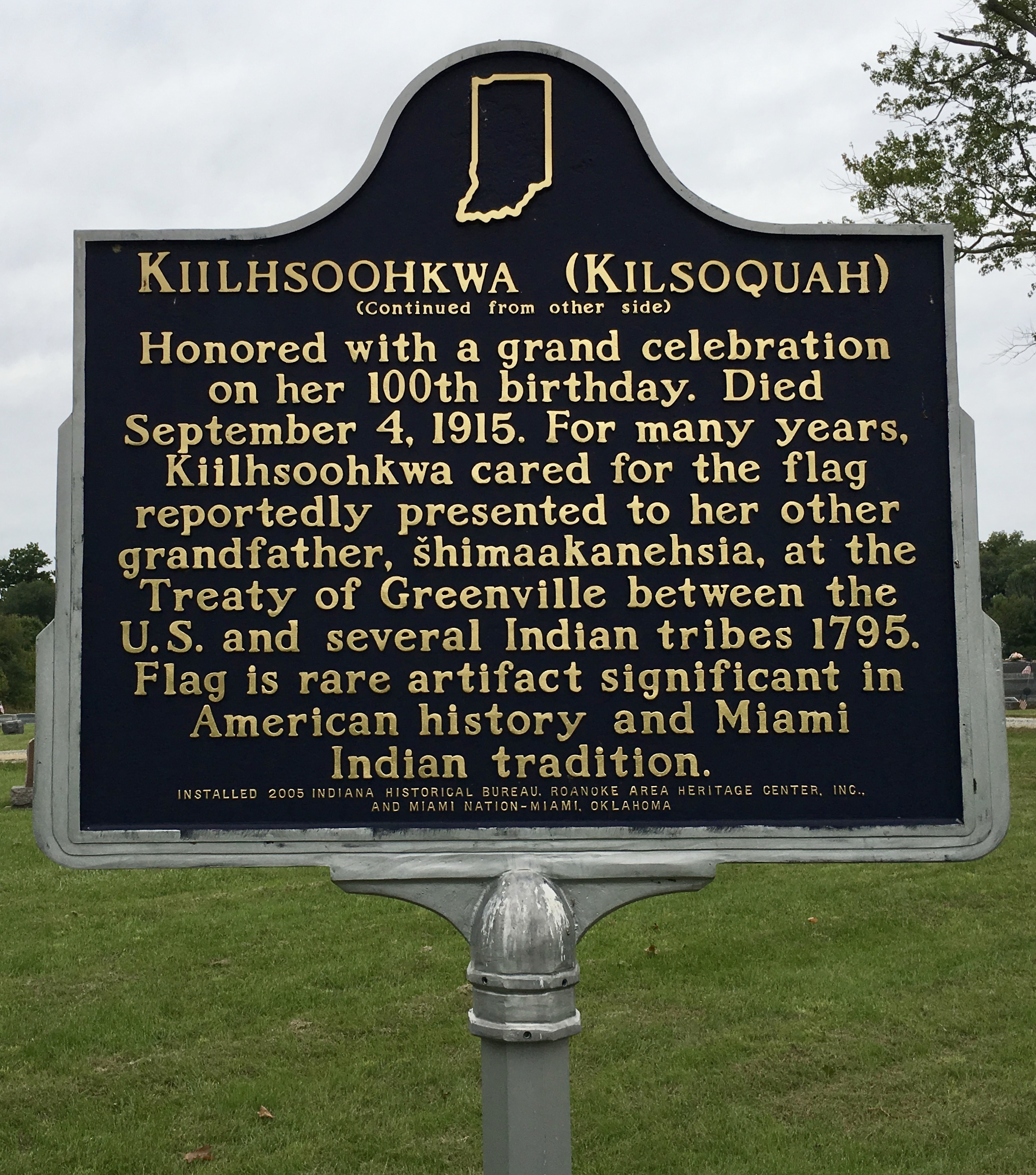
Historic sign (reverse) at Glenwood Cemetery in Roanoke, IN commemorating and memorializing Kiilhsoohkwa.

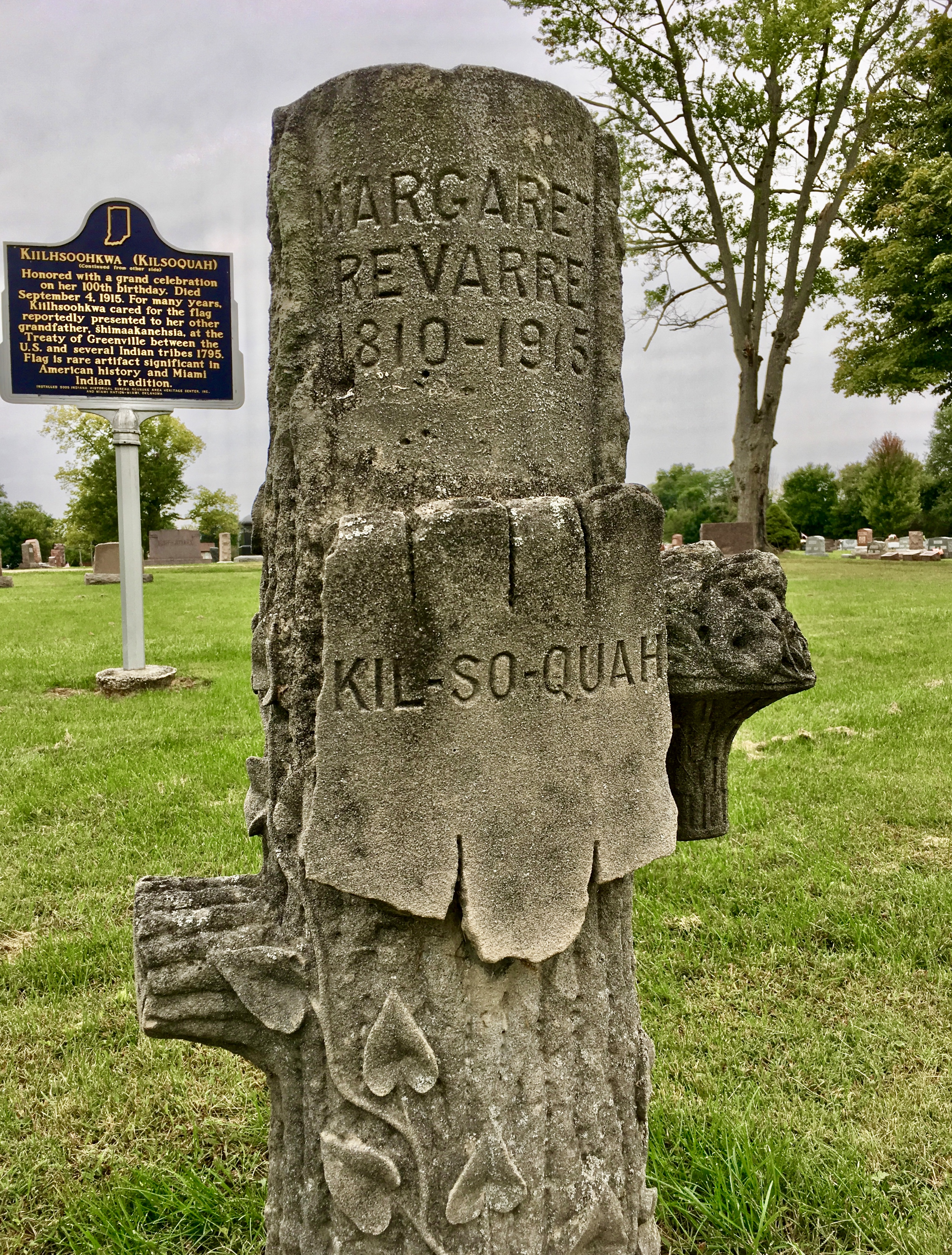
Headstone at Glenwood Cemetery in Roanoke, IN commemorating and memorializing Kiilhsoohkwa.

She died on 4 September 1915 at her home in Roanoke after spending a few weeks ill and confined to her bed. Her death was described as "without a struggle, for death was only a break in the well worn thread of life." Her death was described in 1917 as a loss of "the last royal Miamis and the oldest resident of the State of Indiana, who had enjoyed a national reputation." Her funeral services were held at St. Joseph Catholic Church in Roanoke and she was buried in the I.O.O.F. Cemetery (Glenwood Cemetery) in Roanoke.

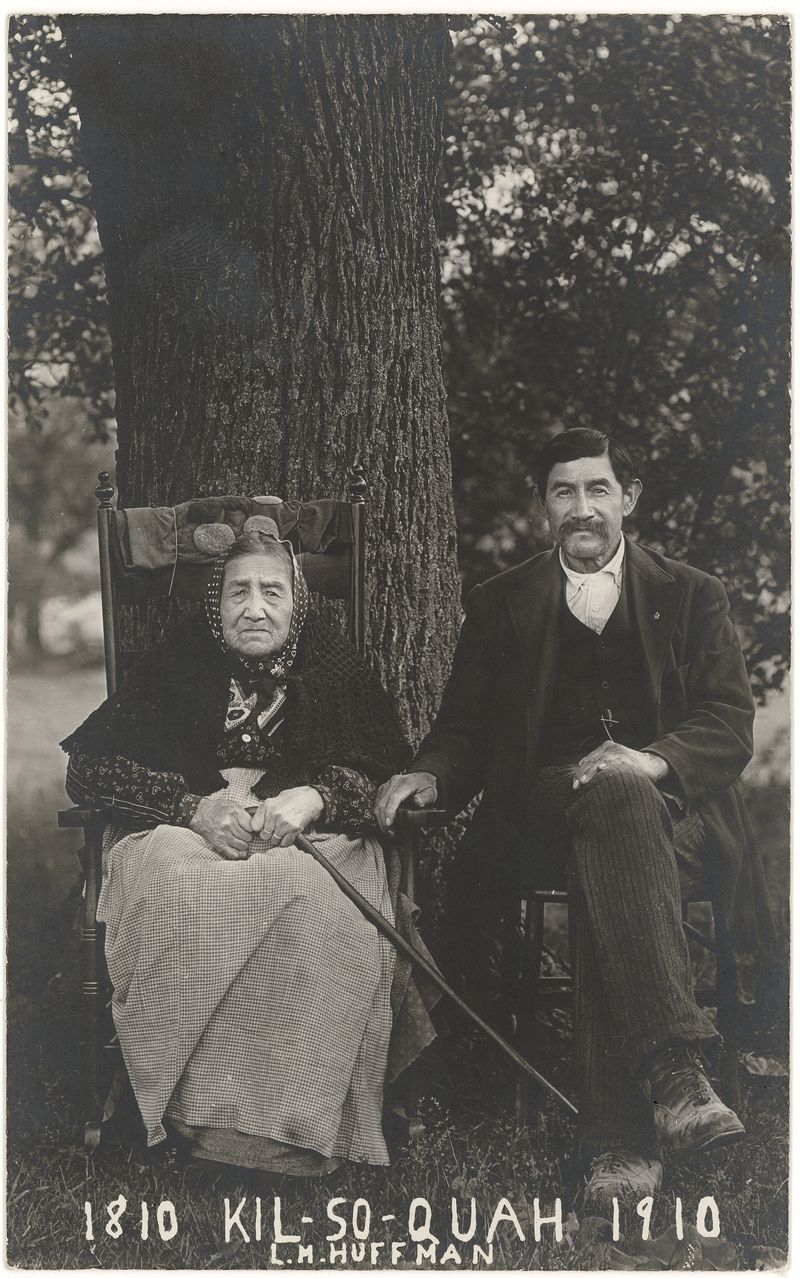
Kiilh-sooh-kwa and her son, 1910 by L. M. Huffman. Courtesy of Smithsonian Institution National Museum of the American Indian.

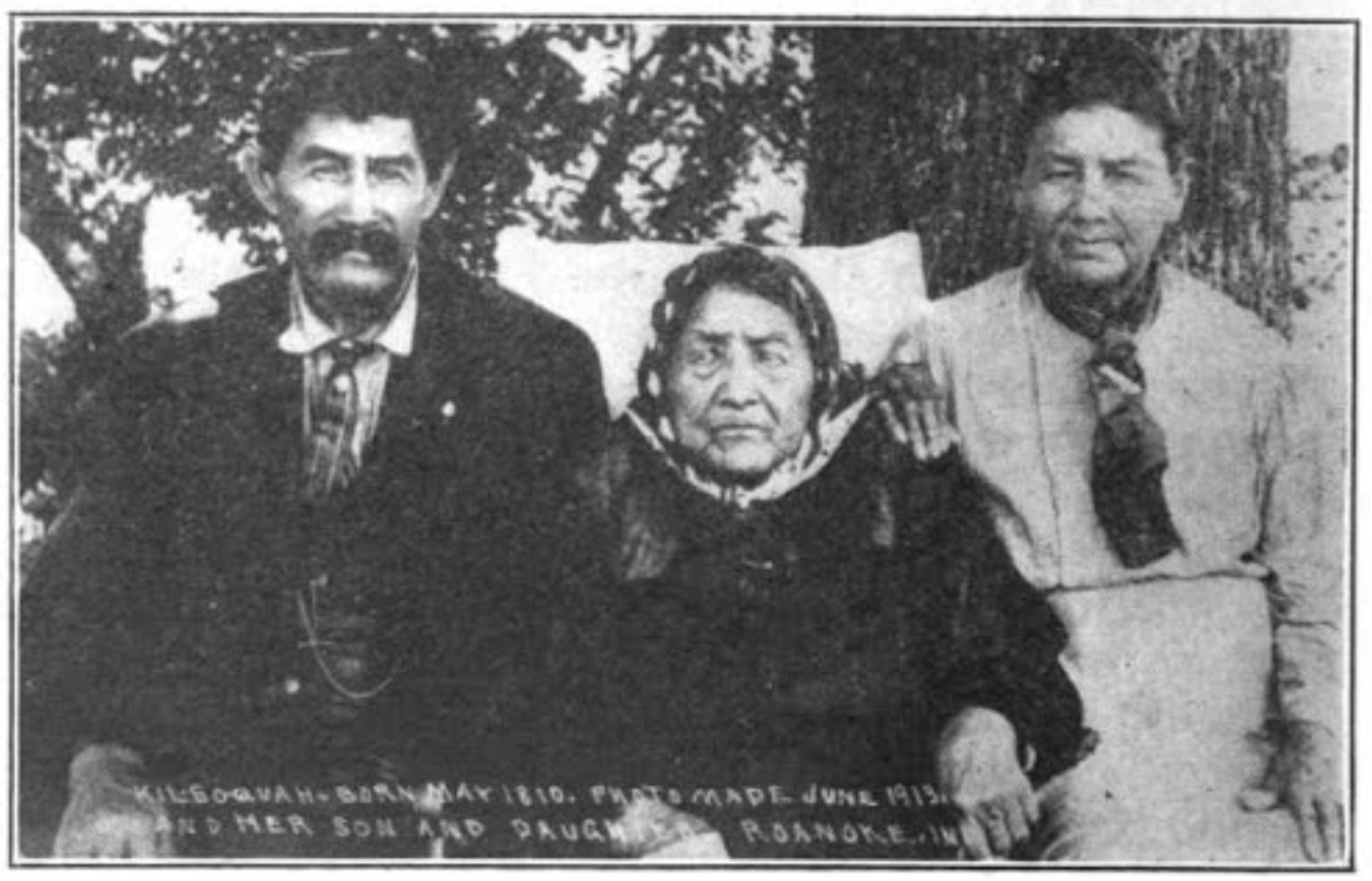
Kiilh-sooh-kwa in June 1913 with her son and her daughter. Originally printed in 1917 in Little Turtle (Me-she-kin-no-quah): The Great Chief of the Miami Indian Nations by C. M. Young.
