= WQHU-LP =

- Huntington, Indiana; United States
- Frequency: 105.5 MHz
- Branding: Forester Radio

Programming
- Format: Christian Rock, Christian Hip-hop

Ownership
- Owner: Huntington University

History
- First air date: 2002
- Former call signs: WQHC-LP (2001–2005)

Technical information
- Licensing authority: FCC
- Facility ID: 124382
- Class: L1
- ERP: 100 watts
- HAAT: 29.1 meters (95 ft)
- Transmitter coordinates: 40°56′55.00″N 85°30′31.00″W

Links
- Public license information: LMS
- Webcast: Listen live
- Website: http://foresterradio.com

WQHU-LP (105.5 FM, "Forester Radio") is Huntington University's award-winning radio station low-power FM radio station broadcasting Christian Rock and Christian Hip-hop music formats from the 1980s through today. Licensed to Huntington, Indiana, United States, the station is owned by Huntington University.

== History ==
The Federal Communications Commission issued a construction permit for the station on July 10, 2001. The station was assigned the call sign WQHC-LP on September 13, 2001, and received its license to cover on November 12, 2002. On June 1, 2005, the station changed its call sign to the current WQHU-LP.

== Programming ==
WQHU-LP broadcasts in Huntington, Indiana on WQHU-LP 105.5 FM and worldwide on ForesterRadio.com. The station's mission is "to share the love of God and the Gospel of Jesus Christ, to support the local Huntington community, and to train the next generation of radio, voiceover, and music industry professionals."

The majority of the programming heard on Forester Radio is produced by Huntington University students, including a popular "Rooted" podcast. In addition to music, Forester Radio also broadcasts "HU Overtime", a weekly program and podcast centered on HU Athletics.
