= Quayle Vice Presidential Learning Center =

Coordinates: 40.8849°N 85.4960°W

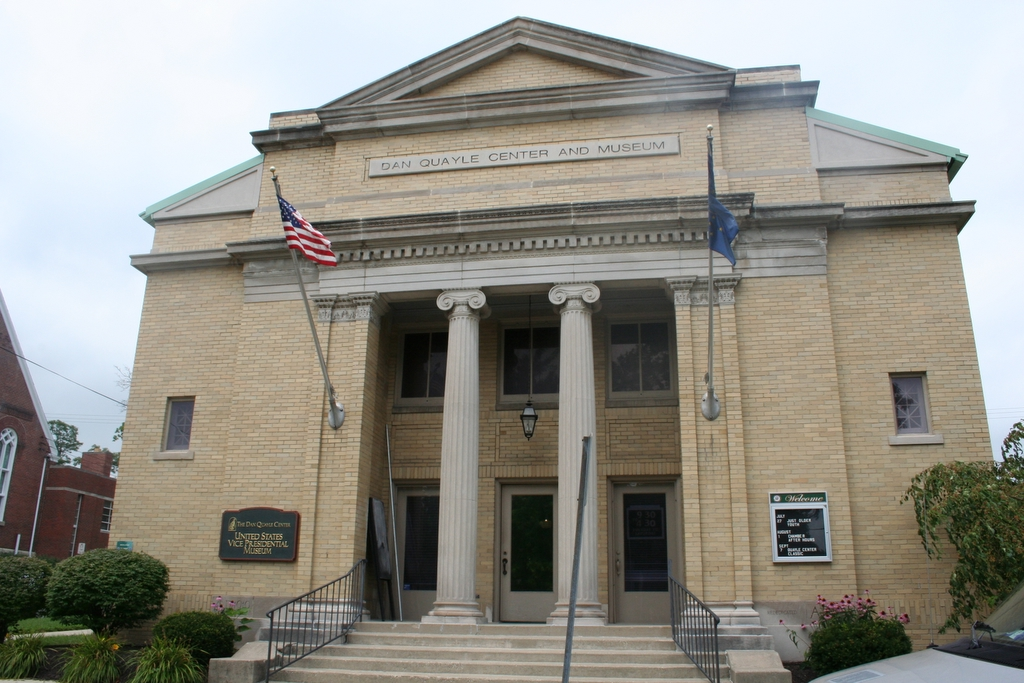
The Quayle Vice Presidential Learning Center, formerly First Church of Christ, Scientist, Huntington, Indiana,

The Quayle Vice Presidential Learning Center, commonly referred to as the Dan Quayle Museum, is located at 815 Warren Street in Huntington, Indiana, where former Vice President Dan Quayle attended high school. The center is downtown in a renovated church, the former First Church of Christ, Scientist, and has two floors. The first floor features the history of all the vice presidents of the United States, while the second floor houses memorabilia and a theater. Regular school programs are held. It is located in the Old Plat Historic District.

The Dan Quayle Center and Museum was opened to the public on June 17, 1993, and officially dedicated on October 16, 1993. In 2002, the board of directors for the DQCF changed the name of the facility from The Dan Quayle Center and Museum to The Dan Quayle Center home of the United States Vice Presidential Museum. In 2008, the board of directors changed the name to The Quayle Vice Presidential Learning Center.

Special attention is paid to the six vice presidents hailing from Indiana—Schuyler Colfax, Thomas Hendricks, Charles Fairbanks, Thomas Marshall, Dan Quayle, and Mike Pence—and the three losing vice presidential candidates: George W. Julian, William H. English, and John W. Kern.

At one time in American history, Indiana was a vital "swing state;" as such, it provided numerous candidates for vice president.

== See also ==
- Presidential library system
- List of museums in Indiana
- List of former Christian Science churches, societies and buildings
