= Otto U. King =

American Dentist

- Born: March 18, 1873; Huntington, Indiana
- Died: August 13, 1951 (aged 78); Huntington, Indiana
- Education: Northwestern University Dental School
- Occupation: Dentist
- Organization: American Dental Association
- Notable work: Journal of the American Dental Association (JADA)
- Spouse: Mayme Beaver

Otto Ulysses King (1873–1951) was an American dentist from Huntington, Indiana and the first General Secretary and Editor of the American Dental Association in 1913–1927. In 1920, King co-founded the American College of Dentists after returning from World War I where he served as a member on the Committee on Dentistry for the Council of National Defense. He also founded the Journal of the American Dental Association, which at the time of founding was called Official Bulletin of the National Dental Association.

== Early life ==
Otto U. King's parents, Frank King and Xantha King, gave birth to him in Huntington, Indiana on March 18, 1873. As an orator and president of his senior class in university, King graduated from Northwestern University Dental School in 1897. In 1898, he married Mayme Beaver in Huntington where they then had two children.

== Professional life ==
Otto U. King founded his practice in Huntington, Indiana after graduating from dental school.

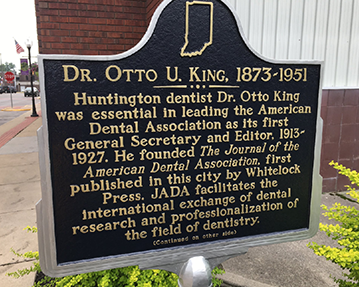
Dr. Otto U. King historical marker

As a dentist, King had multiple accomplishments and positions within the United States. He was Indiana State Dental Association President. He was elected as General Secretary of the National Dental Association, currently known as the American Dental Association. He also founded Journal of the American Dental Association (JADA). King was responsible for boosting membership of the American Dental Association to 12,000 members with 24,000 readers of the Journal.

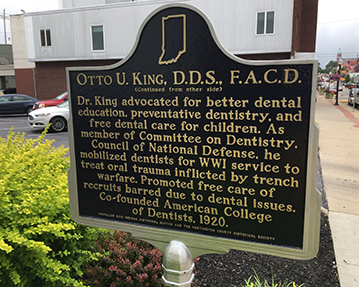
Dr. Otto U. King historical marker back

President Woodrow Wilson had appointed him to represent the United States in the International Dental Conference in London in 1914. During World War I, King participated as an army dentist, helping people who were injured in the jaw and face as a result of trench warfare. Working with the Red Cross through the Preparedness League, he established medical ambulances that specialized in jaw and face treatment for soldiers. He also helped children with teeth problems throughout Europe. The League encouraged dental hygiene to ensure that soldiers are able to eat properly and are able to fight.

King was also a member on Committee on Dentistry, which was part of the General Medical Board of the Council of National Defense for World War I. He used the Journal of the American Dental Association to advertise membership and promote support for the war efforts.

He was an advocate for promoting dental care, especially among children of low income families who could not afford treatment. Part of what he encouraged was preventative care rather than dealing with larger problems when they happen. King emphasized dental hygiene to ensure the prevention of disease. He is quoted to have said that "socialized health" should combat "capitalist disease" and emphasized the need for free dental health care clinics.

Emphasizing the need to educate student and professional dentists alike, King helped establish a library as part of the ADA. He also taught in New York's Columbia University. In 1927, King focused on private practice and retired from the ADA.

He died August 13, 1951, in Huntington, Indiana.

In 2018, a historical marker was erected in Huntington, Indiana to honor King's accomplishments in modern dentistry.
