= Madame Margaret LaFolier House =

Historic house in Indiana, United States

- Formerly listed on the U.S. National Register of Historic Places
- Nearest city: West of Huntington on U.S. Route 24, near Huntington, Indiana
- Area: 1 acre (0.40 ha)
- Built: c. 1830
- Architectural style: Greek Revival
- NRHP reference No.: 82000040

Significant dates
- Added to NRHP: February 19, 1982
- Removed from NRHP: December 18, 1990

Madame Margaret LaFolier House, also known as the Ludwig House, was a historic home located near Huntington in Huntington County, Indiana. It was built in the 1830s, and was a two-story, Greek Revival style frame dwelling. It has been demolished.

It was listed on the National Register of Historic Places in 1982 and delisted in 1990.
