= Jen Lancaster =

American writer

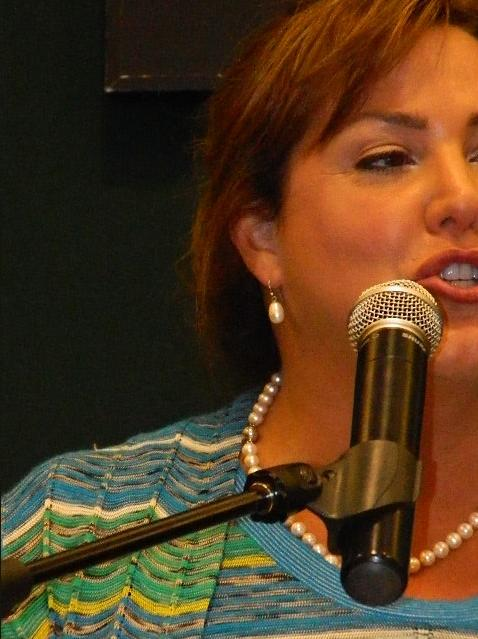
Visiting Barnes & Noble Tribeca for Tao of Martha book signing, June 4, 2013.

Jennifer ("Jen") Lancaster (born November 5, 1967) is an American author whose titles have appeared on The New York Times Best Seller list.

Lancaster was an associate vice president for a technology company prior to being laid off after 9/11. Being laid off, and her adaptation to being unemployed, became the subject matter for her blog and, later, her books.

Lancaster was raised in Indiana and now resides in Chicago, Illinois with her husband, Fletch, and their many pets. She is an alumna of Purdue University. She is known for her humor and rampant narcissism which is mentioned in her books.

== Publications ==
- Bitter is the New Black; memoir: released 2006
- Bright Lights, Big Ass; memoir: released 2007
- Such a Pretty Fat; memoir: released 2008
- Pretty in Plaid; memoir: released 2010
- My Fair Lazy; memoir: released 2010
- If You Were Here; fiction: released 2011
- Here I Go Again; fiction: released 2012
- Jeneration X; memoir: released 2013
- The Tao of Martha; memoir: released 2014
- Twisted Sisters; fiction: released 2014
- I Regret Nothing; memoir: released 2015
- The Best of Enemies; fiction: released 2015
- By the Numbers; fiction: released 2016
- The Gatekeepers; fiction: released 2017
- Stories I'd Tell in Bars; memoir: released 2017
- Welcome to the United States of Anxiety; memoir released 2020
- House Moms; fiction: released 2023
