= Roanoke, Indiana =

- Town
- Location of Roanoke in Huntington County, Indiana.
- Coordinates: 40°57′48″N 85°22′25″W
- Country: United States
- State: Indiana
- County: Huntington
- Township: Jackson

Area
  - Total: 1.21 sq mi (3.13 km^{2})
  - Land: 1.20 sq mi (3.12 km^{2})
  - Water: 0.0039 sq mi (0.01 km^{2})
- Elevation: 784 ft (239 m)

Population (2020)
  - Total: 1,762
  - Density: 1,464.8/sq mi (565.56/km^{2})
- Time zone: UTC-5 (Eastern (EST))
  - Summer (DST): UTC-4 (EDT)
- ZIP code: 46783
- Area code: 260
- FIPS code: 18-65016
- GNIS feature ID: 2396885
- Website: townofroanoke.com

Roanoke is a town in Jackson Township, Huntington County, Indiana, United States. The population was 1,762 at the 2020 census. Roanoke is governed by a town council. Town offices include the clerk treasurer, utilities department, police department, and volunteer fire department. The town has a public elementary school. WOWO and WRNP have transmitter towers in Roanoke, along U.S. Highway 24. For many years, television station WPTA was licensed to Roanoke, though that station's studios and transmitter have always been located in nearby Fort Wayne.

== History ==
Once the hunting and fishing grounds of the Miami Indians, Roanoke became a prosperous commercial center in the mid-19th century. Kiilhsoohkwa (meaning "sun-woman"), the granddaughter of Chief Little Turtle, lived in Roanoke and was known by locals as “the last of the Miami tribe.”

Roanoke had its start in about 1848, soon after the building of the Wabash and Erie Canal through that territory. The completion of the canal through Jackson Township enticed European-American settlers to the area. In the wake of the canal's completion, the town became an important shipping point in the region and a source of supplies for neighboring towns in Allen, Huntington, and Whitley counties. One of the earliest settlers in the area was Jarred Darrow who arrived in 1837. Between 1840 and 1847 the area's population swelled and included a large number of persons belonging to the United Brethren Church, the Methodist Church, and the Lutheran Church. Roanoke was incorporated as a town in 1874. The town was named after Roanoke, Virginia.

== Geography ==
According to the 2010 census, Roanoke has a total area of 1.206 square miles (3.12 km^{2}), of which 1.2 square miles (3.11 km^{2}) (or 99.5%) is land and 0.006 square miles (0.02 km^{2}) (or 0.5%) is water.

== Demographics ==
Historical population
Census	Pop.	Note	%±
1860	270		—
1870	627		132.2%
1880	597		−4.8%
1890	532		−10.9%
1900	536		0.8%
1910	699		30.4%
1920	760		8.7%
1930	849		11.7%
1940	808		−4.8%
1950	905		12.0%
1960	935		3.3%
1970	858		−8.2%
1980	891		3.8%
1990	1,018		14.3%
2000	1,495		46.9%
2010	1,722		15.2%
2020	1,762		2.3%
U.S. Decennial Census

=== 2020 census ===
As of the 2020 census, Roanoke had a population of 1,762. The median age was 41.4 years. 22.6% of residents were under the age of 18 and 17.9% of residents were 65 years of age or older. For every 100 females there were 93.6 males, and for every 100 females age 18 and over there were 90.4 males age 18 and over.

0.0% of residents lived in urban areas, while 100.0% lived in rural areas.

There were 773 households in Roanoke, of which 28.2% had children under the age of 18 living in them. Of all households, 49.9% were married-couple households, 15.9% were households with a male householder and no spouse or partner present, and 26.9% were households with a female householder and no spouse or partner present. About 31.3% of all households were made up of individuals and 13.5% had someone living alone who was 65 years of age or older.

There were 861 housing units, of which 10.2% were vacant. The homeowner vacancy rate was 2.0% and the rental vacancy rate was 8.9%.

Racial composition as of the 2020 census
Race	Number	Percent
White	1,645	93.4%
Black or African American	8	0.5%
American Indian and Alaska Native	8	0.5%
Asian	3	0.2%
Native Hawaiian and Other Pacific Islander	0	0.0%
Some other race	18	1.0%
Two or more races	80	4.5%
Hispanic or Latino (of any race)	58	3.3%

=== 2010 census ===
As of the census of 2010, there were 1,722 people, 680 households, and 487 families living in the town. The population density was 1,435.0 inhabitants per square mile (554.1/km^{2}). There were 756 housing units at an average density of 630.0 per square mile (243.2/km^{2}). The racial makeup of the town was 97.1% White, 0.2% African American, 0.1% Native American, 0.5% Asian, 0.5% from other races, and 1.7% from two or more races. Hispanic or Latino of any race were 1.7% of the population.

There were 680 households, of which 35.1% had children under the age of 18 living with them, 58.2% were married couples living together, 9.6% had a female householder with no husband present, 3.8% had a male householder with no wife present, and 28.4% were non-families. 23.2% of all households were made up of individuals, and 8.1% had someone living alone who was 65 years of age or older. The average household size was 2.52 and the average family size was 3.01.

The median age in the town was 36.8 years. 26.1% of residents were under the age of 18; 6.4% were between the ages of 18 and 24; 29.5% were from 25 to 44; 26.1% were from 45 to 64; and 11.8% were 65 years of age or older. The gender makeup of the town was 48.6% male and 51.4% female.

=== 2000 census ===
As of the census of 2000, there were 1,495 people, 589 households, and 411 families living in the town. The population density was 2,400.5 inhabitants per square mile (926.8/km^{2}). There were 630 housing units at an average density of 1,011.6 per square mile (390.6/km^{2}). The racial makeup of the town was 98.66% White, 0.27% African American, 0.13% Native American, 0.20% Asian, 0.20% from other races, and 0.54% from two or more races. Hispanic or Latino of any race were 0.94% of the population.

There were 589 households, out of which 35.7% had children under the age of 18 living with them, 57.2% were married couples living together, 9.5% had a female householder with no husband present, and 30.2% were non-families. 26.5% of all households were made up of individuals, and 8.5% had someone living alone who was 65 years of age or older. The average household size was 2.51 and the average family size was 3.07.

In the town, the population was spread out, with 27.4% under the age of 18, 8.2% from 18 to 24, 31.9% from 25 to 44, 22.5% from 45 to 64, and 9.9% who were 65 years of age or older. The median age was 35 years. For every 100 females, there were 93.4 males. For every 100 females age 18 and over, there were 91.4 males.

The median income for a household in the town was $47,250, and the median income for a family was $54,306. Males had a median income of $39,375 versus $23,750 for females. The per capita income for the town was $20,373. About 2.7% of families and 5.4% of the population were below the poverty line, including 7.9% of those under age 18 and 4.0% of those age 65 or over.

== Education ==
Roanoke is home to the Roanoke Elementary School, a primary school which covers kindergarten through fifth grade. It is part of the Huntington County Community School Corporation. The town also has a lending library, the Roanoke Public Library.

== Notable people ==
- Gene Hartley, Indy Car Driver
- Kiilhsoohkwa, Granddaughter of Myaamia Chief Mihšihkinaahkwa (var. Little Turtle)
