= Old Plat Historic District =

Historic district in Indiana, United States

- U.S. National Register of Historic Places
- U.S. Historic district
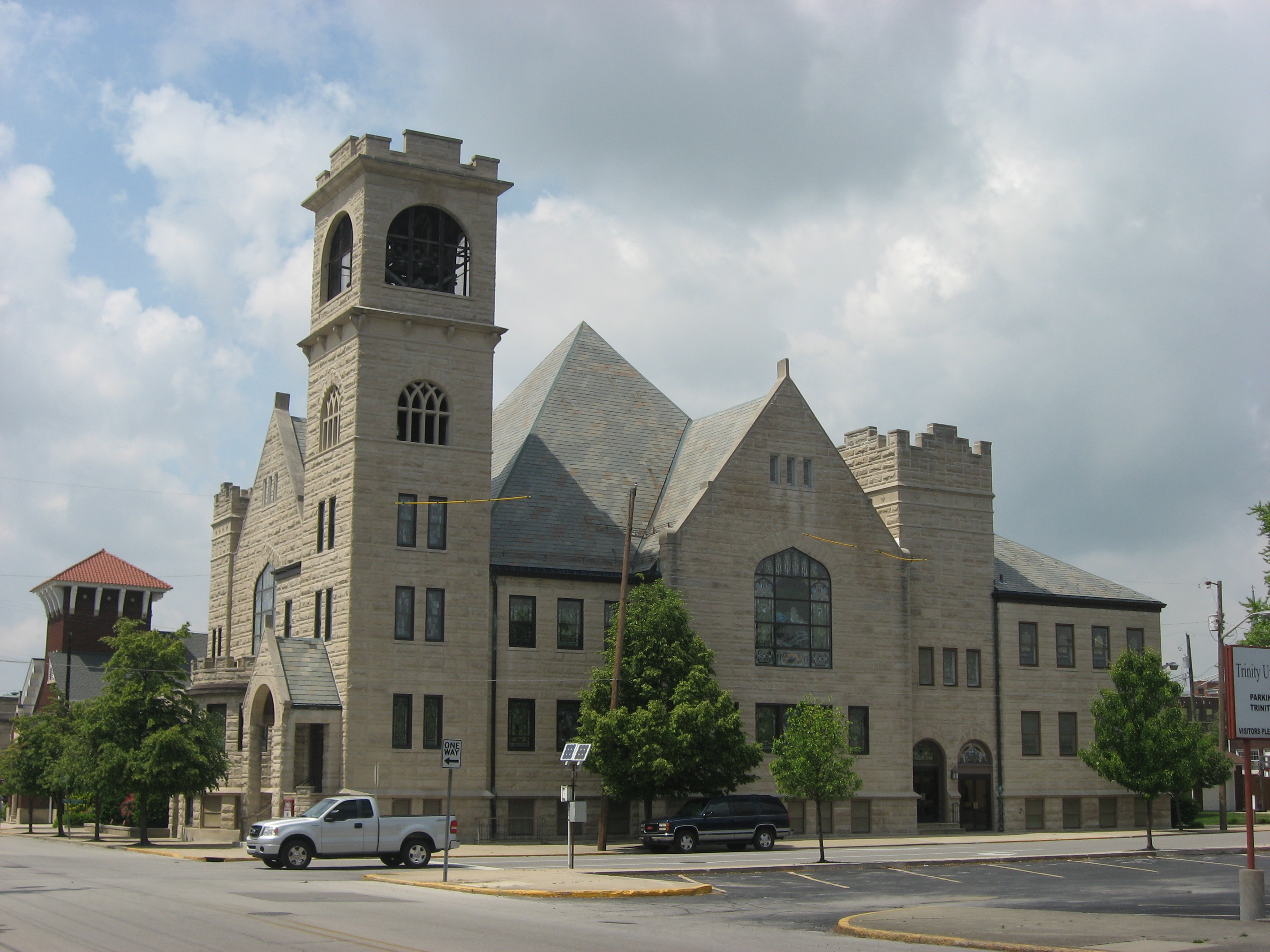
- Trinity Methodist, May 2012

- Location within Indiana Location within the United States
- Location: Roughly Bounded by Warren, John, Wilkerson, Lincoln, Washington, Second and Court Sts., Huntington, Indiana
- Coordinates: 40°53′01″N 85°29′32″W
- Area: 130 acres (53 ha)
- Architectural style: Greek Revival, Gothic Revival, et al.
- NRHP reference No.: 00000196
- Added to NRHP: March 15, 2000

Old Plat Historic District is a national historic district located at Huntington, Indiana. The district includes 177 contributing buildings and two contributing structures in a mixed residential section of Huntington. It developed between about 1860 and 1920 and includes notable examples of Greek Revival, Gothic Revival, Italianate, and Queen Anne style architecture. Notable buildings include the Mathew Luber House (c. 1895), George W. Humbert House (c. 1880), Trinity Methodist Episcopal Church (1914), First Church of Christ Scientist (1919, now The Quayle Vice Presidential Learning Center), and Masonic Temple (1926).

It was listed on the National Register of Historic Places in 2000.
