= Taylor-Zent House =

Historic house in Indiana, United States

- U.S. National Register of Historic Places
- U.S. Historic district – Contributing property
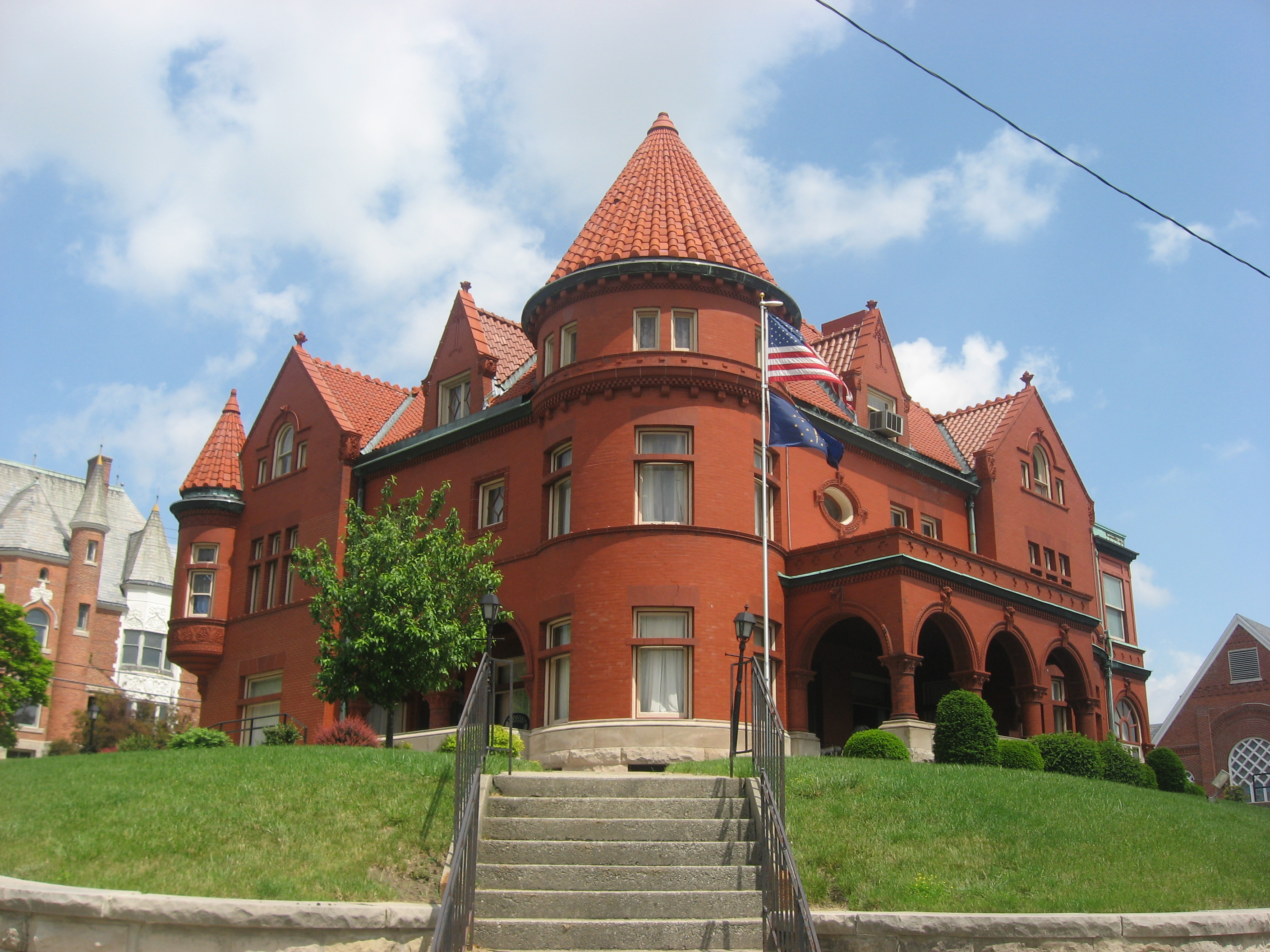
- Front and southern side of the house

- Location within Indiana Location within the United States
- Location: 715 N. Jefferson St., Huntington, Indiana
- Coordinates: 40°53′4″N 85°29′50″W
- Area: Less than 1 acre (0.40 ha)
- Built: 1896
- Architect: T.J. Long, D.D. Whitelock
- Architectural style: Romanesque
- NRHP reference No.: 82000041
- Added to NRHP: February 11, 1982

The Taylor-Zent House, also known as Hart Funeral Home, is a historic home located at 715 Jefferson Street in Huntington, Indiana, USA. The house is an example of the Romanesque Revival style of architecture. It was built in 1896–98 for Enos T. Taylor, a self-made businessman and banker.

It was listed on the National Register of Historic Places in 1982. It is located in the North Jefferson Street Historic District.
