= Moore/Carlew Building =

- U.S. National Register of Historic Places
- U.S. Historic district – Contributing property
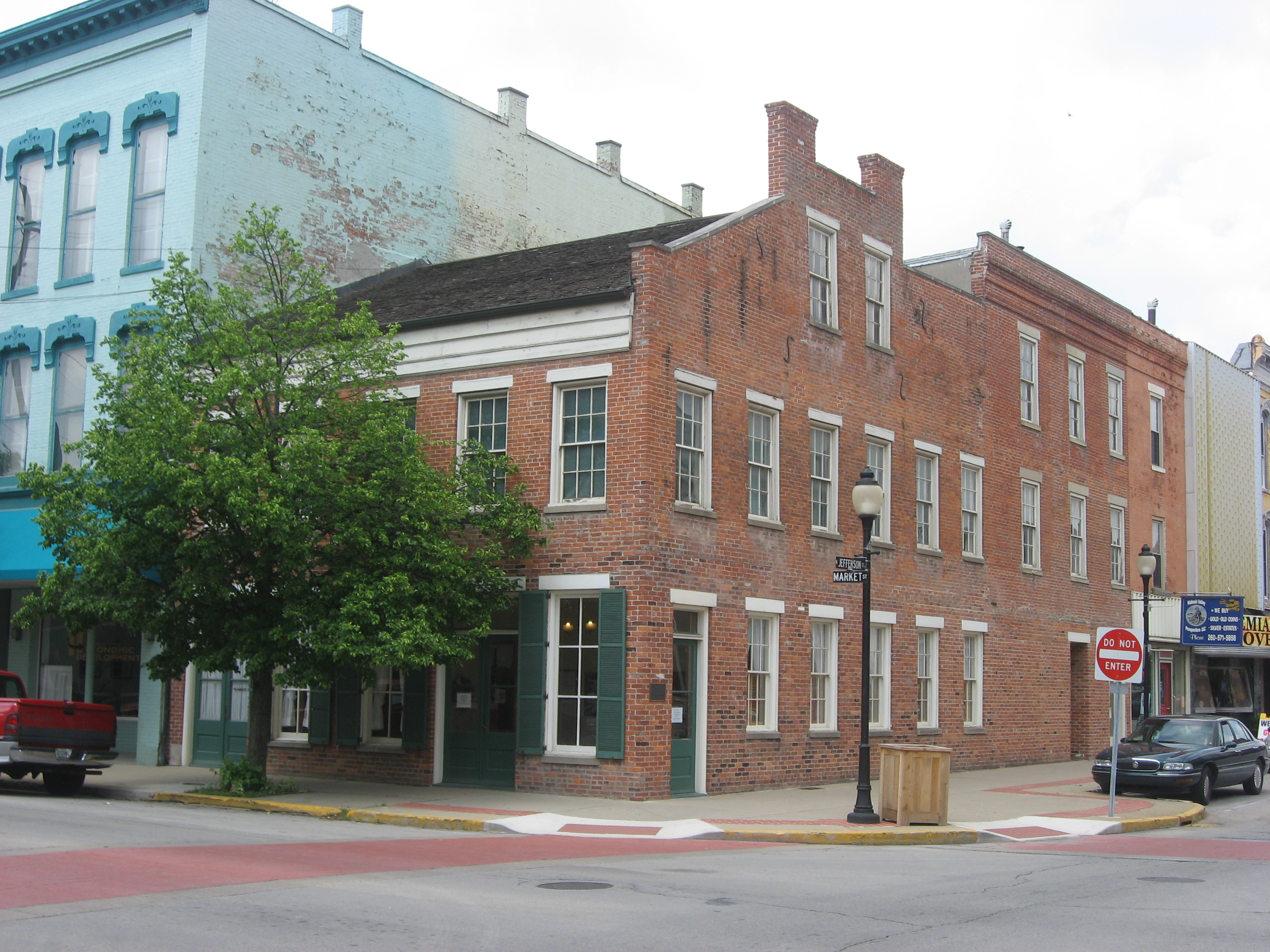
- Moore-Carlew Building, May 2012

- Location within Indiana Location within the United States
- Location: 400 and 410-418 N. Jefferson St., Huntington, Indiana
- Coordinates: 40°52′55″N 85°29′42″W
- Area: less than one acre
- Built: 1844-1845, c. 1865
- Built by: Kenower, John
- Architectural style: Federal
- NRHP reference No.: 83000036
- Added to NRHP: September 1, 1983

Moore/Carlew Building is a historic commercial building located at Huntington, Indiana. It was built in 1844–1845, and is a two-story, Federal style brick building. A three-story rear addition was constructed in 1860s. It is one of the oldest buildings and the first brick structure constructed in Huntington.

It was listed on the National Register of Historic Places in 1983. It is located in the Huntington Courthouse Square Historic District.
