= Hotel LaFontaine =

- U.S. National Register of Historic Places
- U.S. Historic district – Contributing property
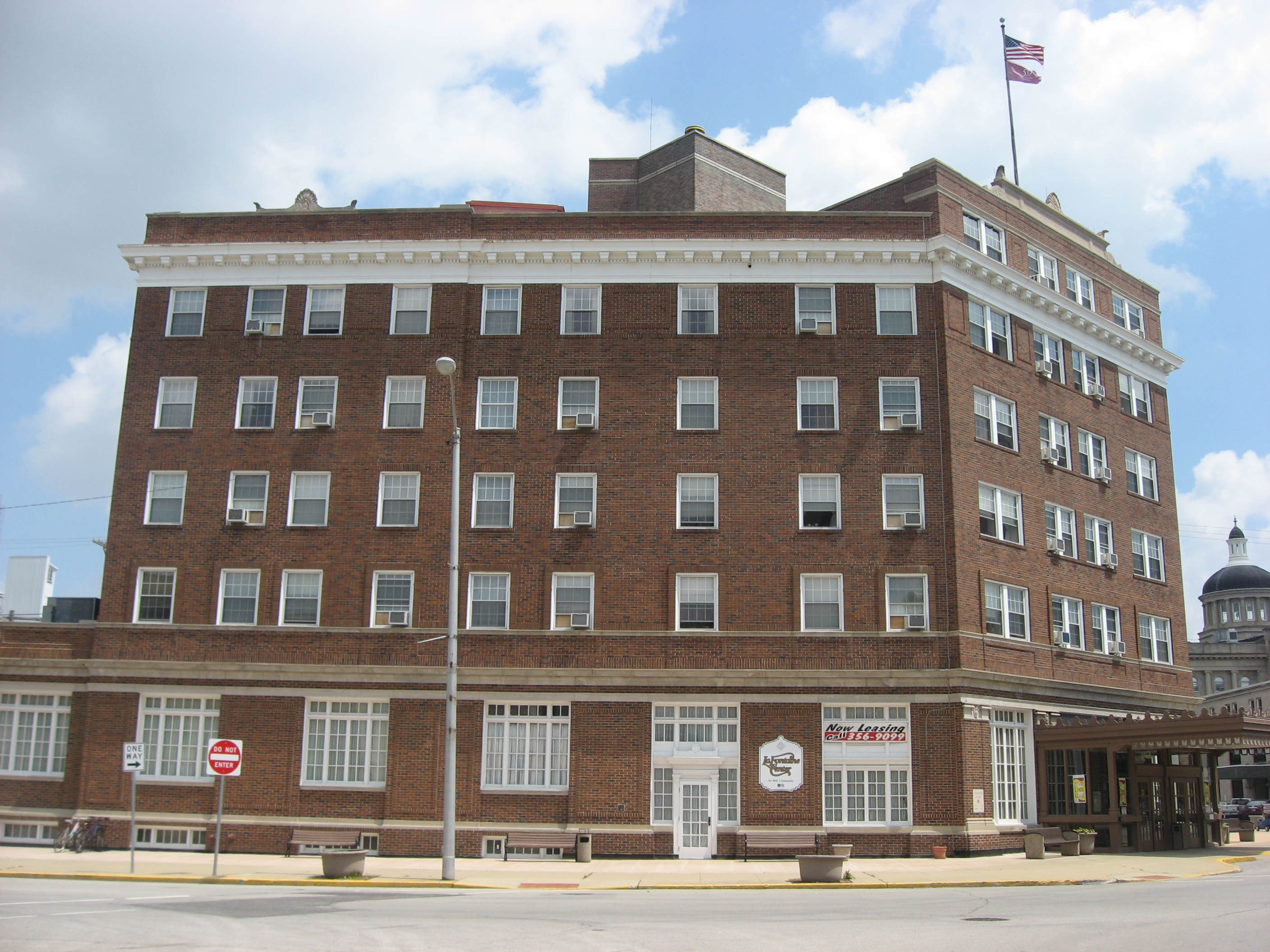
- Hotel LaFontaine, May 2012

- Location within Indiana Location within the United States
- Location: 200 W. State St., Huntington, Indiana
- Coordinates: 40°52′52″N 85°29′42″W
- Area: less than one acre
- Built: 1925
- Architect: Stevens, Robert W.
- Architectural style: Colonial Revival
- NRHP reference No.: 84001056
- Added to NRHP: February 9, 1984

Hotel LaFontaine is a historic hotel building located at Huntington, Indiana. It was built in 1925, and consists of a six-story central pavilion with five-story flanking wings. It is of steel frame and hollow-tile construction and sheathed in brick. The building is in the Colonial Revival style. The lobby is designed to resemble a Spanish courtyard and the basement houses an Egyptian inspired swimming pool that opened in 1927. The hotel is named for Francis La Fontaine. It housed a hotel until 1974.

It was listed on the National Register of Historic Places in 1984. It is located in the Huntington Courthouse Square Historic District.
