= Samuel Purviance House =

Historic house in Indiana, United States

- U.S. National Register of Historic Places
- U.S. Historic district – Contributing property
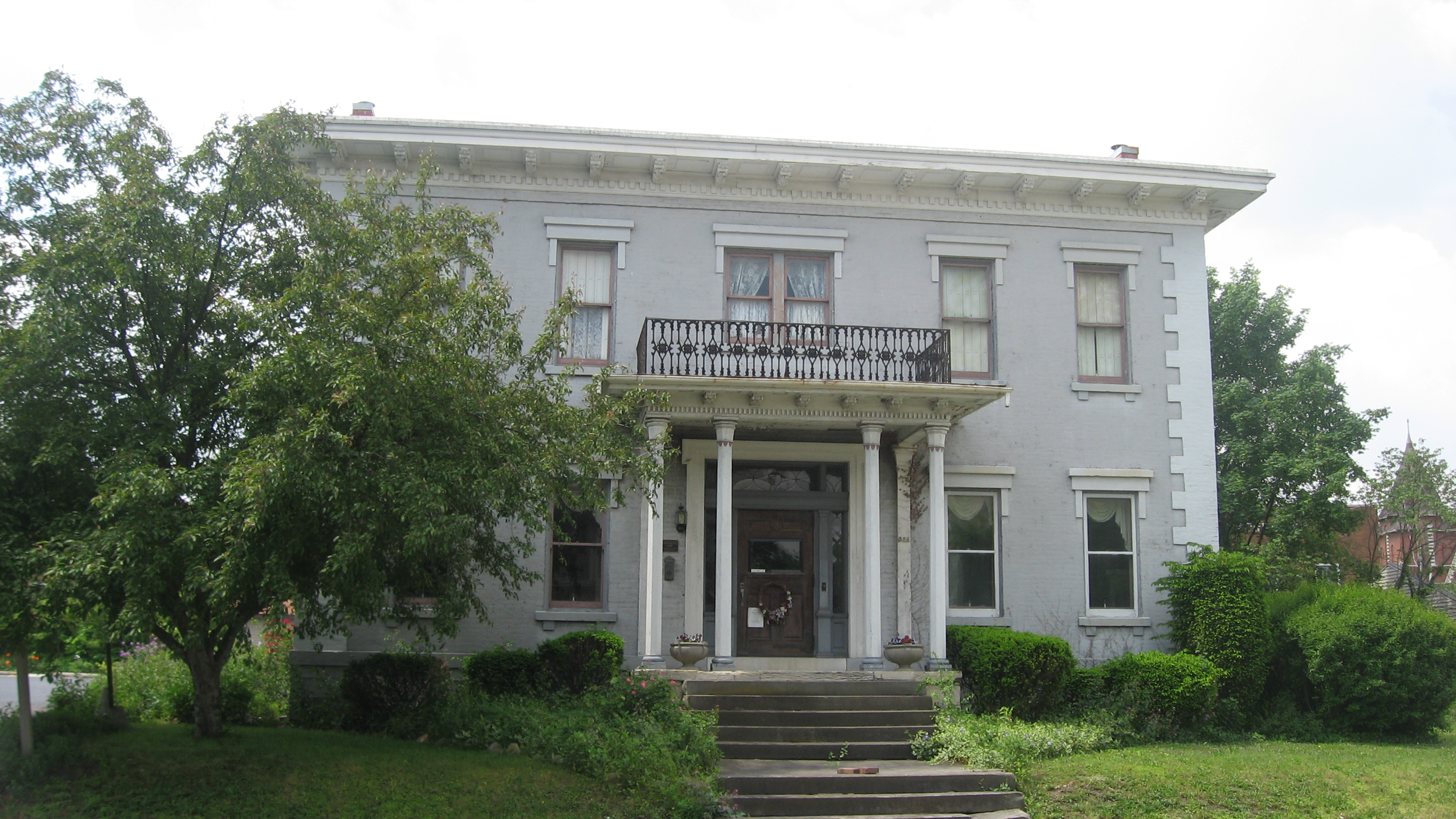
- Samuel Purviance House, May 2012

- Location within Indiana Location within the United States
- Location: 326 S. Jefferson, Huntington, Indiana
- Coordinates: 40°52′40″N 85°29′32″W
- Area: less than one acre
- Built: 1859
- Built by: Fisher, Samuel
- Architectural style: Italianate
- NRHP reference No.: 86001266
- Added to NRHP: June 13, 1986

Samuel Purviance House, also known as Nazarene Annex, is a historic home located at Huntington, Indiana. It was built in 1859, and is a two-story, five-bay, Italianate style brick dwelling with a 1 1/2-story rear ell. It sits on a cut stone foundation and has a flat roof. The front facade features an entrance portico with Gothic style columns. The house was purchased by the Church of the Nazarene in 1960.

It was listed on the National Register of Historic Places in 1986. It is located in the Drover Town Historic District.
