= William Street School =

- U.S. National Register of Historic Places
- U.S. Historic district – Contributing property
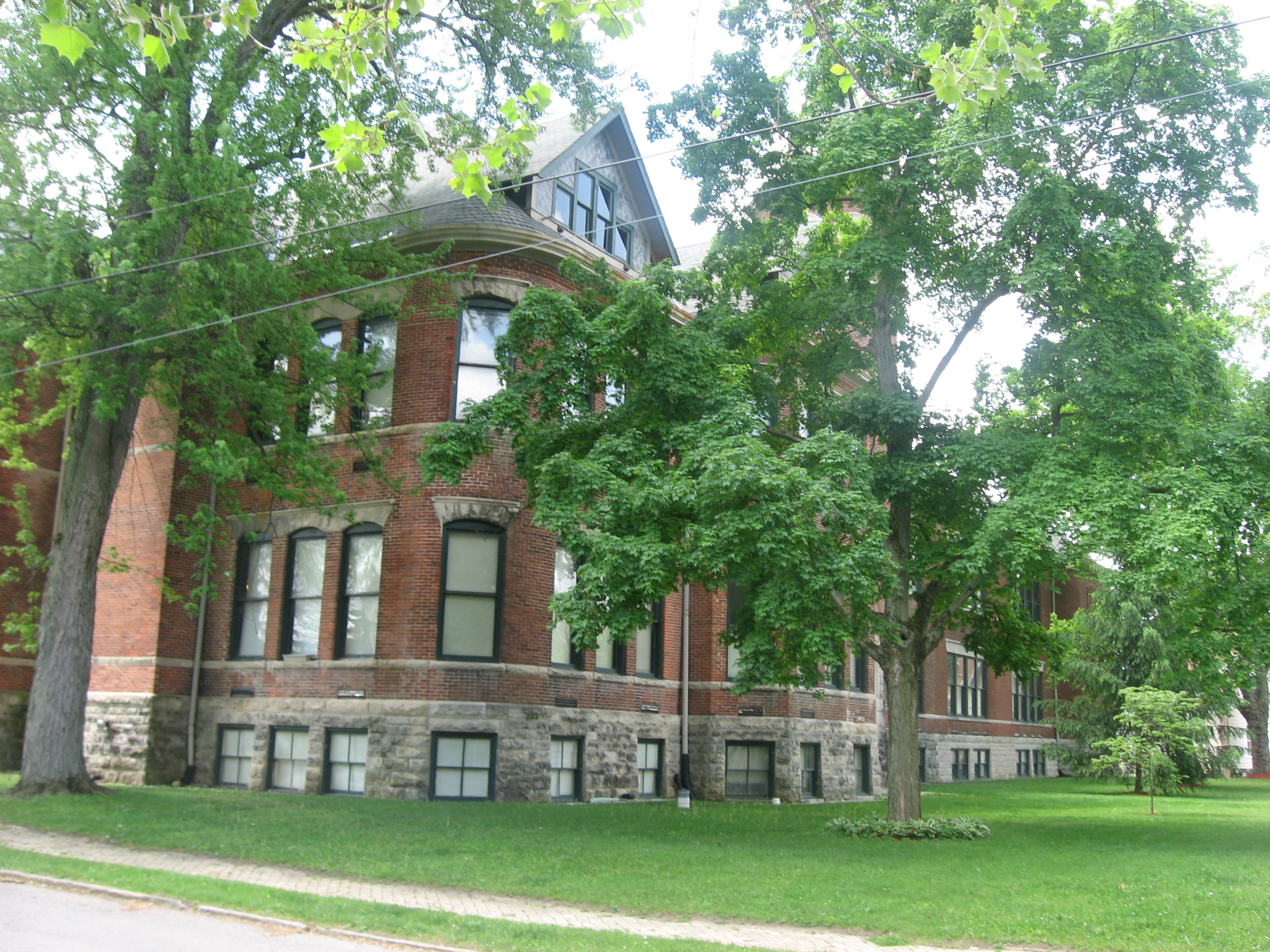
- William Street School, May 2012

- Location within Indiana Location within the United States
- Location: 521 William St., Huntington, Indiana
- Coordinates: 40°52′27″N 85°29′36″W
- Area: 1.7 acres (0.69 ha)
- Built: 1895, 1926
- Architect: Hoover & Brumbaugh; Mohler, A.D., et al.
- Architectural style: Classical Revival, Queen Anne, Romanesque
- NRHP reference No.: 86001390
- Added to NRHP: June 26, 1986

William Street School, also known as Horace Mann School, is a historic school building located at Huntington, Indiana. The original section was built in 1895, and is a 2 1/2-story, rectangular plan brick building with Romanesque Revival and Queen Anne style design elements. It sits on a raised basement, has a rounded corner and projecting gable, bell tower, and has a multi-gabled slate roof. A two-story, Neoclassical style addition was built in 1926.

It was listed on the National Register of Historic Places in 1986. It is located in the Drover Town Historic District.
