= Huntington Courthouse Square Historic District =

Historic district in Indiana, United States

- U.S. National Register of Historic Places
- U.S. Historic district
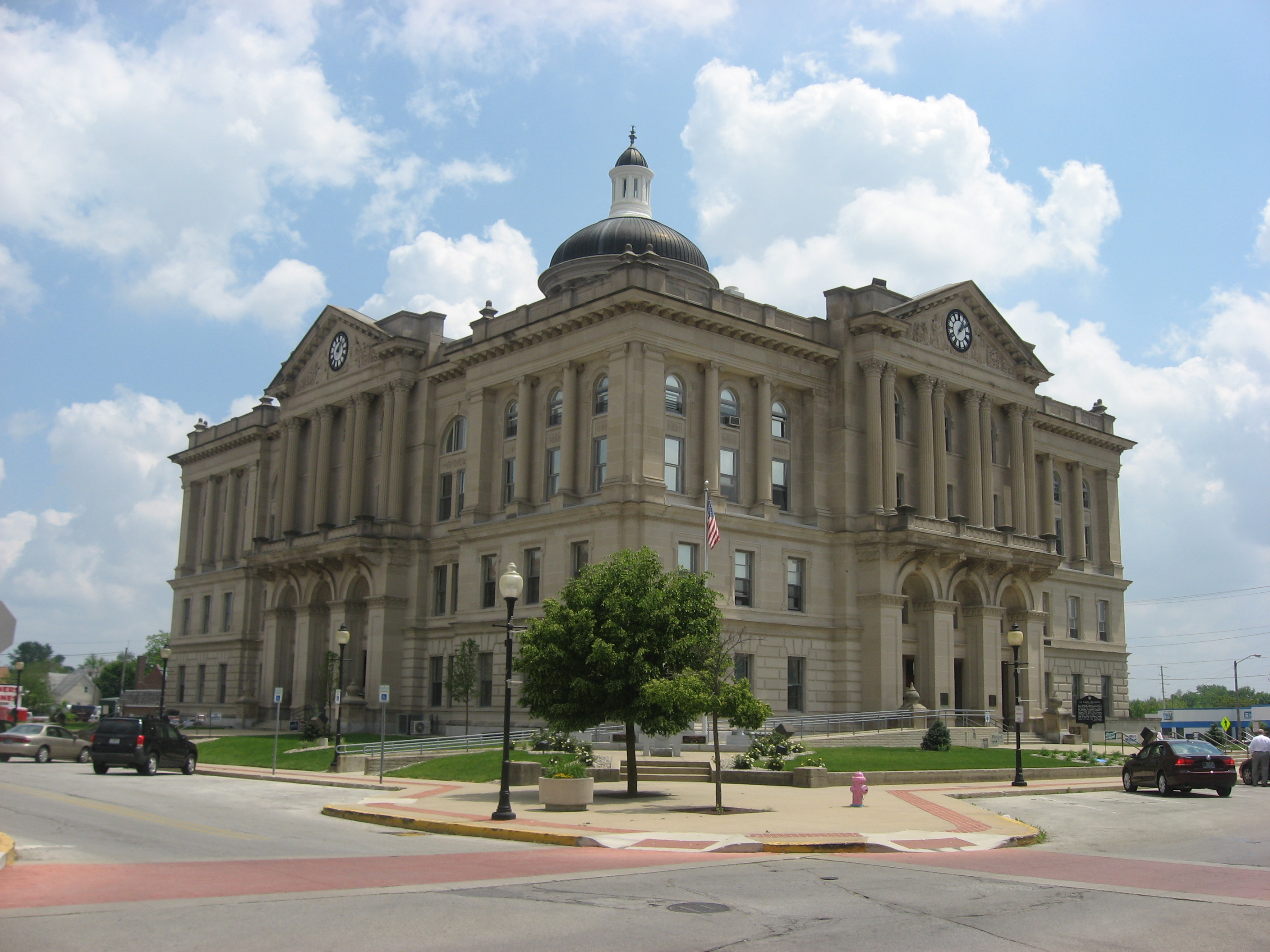
- Huntington County Courthouse, May 2012

- Location within Indiana Location within the United States
- Interactive map showing the location for Huntington Courthouse Square Historic District
- Location: Roughly bounded by State, Court and Cherry Sts., Park Dr. and the alley between Warren and Guilford Sts., Huntington, Indiana
- Coordinates: 40°52′52″N 85°29′37″W
- Area: 27.3 acres (11.0 ha)
- Architect: Multiple
- Architectural style: Italianate, Queen Anne, Romanesque, Neoclassical, Commercial Style
- NRHP reference No.: 92001163
- Added to NRHP: September 4, 1992

Huntington Courthouse Square Historic District is a national historic district located at Huntington, Indiana. The district includes 102 contributing buildings and three contributing structures in the central business district of Huntington. It developed between about 1845 and 1942 and includes notable examples of Italianate, Queen Anne style architecture in the United States, Romanesque Revival, Neoclassical, and Commercial style architecture. Located in the district are the separately listed Moore/Carlew Building and Hotel LaFontaine. Other notable buildings include the Hotel Huntington (1848), Opera House (1881), Lewis Block, Huntington County Courthouse (1904), old Post Office (1916), Citizens' State Bank (c. 1927), City Hall / Fire Station (1904), Huntington Light and Fuel Building, Our Sunday Visitor building (1926), YMCA (1929), and Huntington Theater (1904, 1940).

It was listed on the National Register of Historic Places in 1992.
