= Victory Noll–St. Felix Friary Historic District =

Historic district in Indiana, United States

- U.S. National Register of Historic Places
- U.S. Historic district
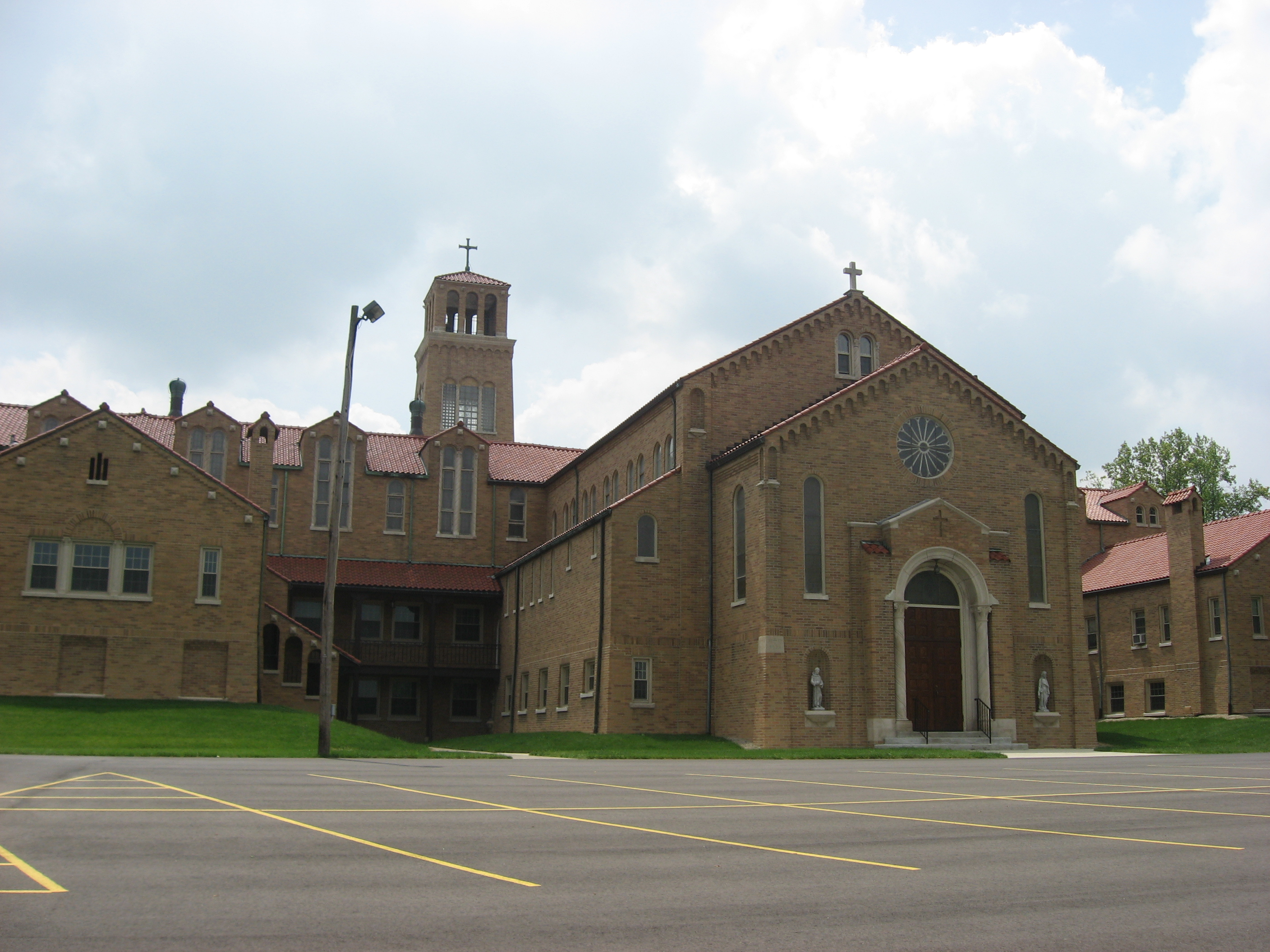
- St. Felix Friary, May 2012

- Location within Indiana Location within the United States
- Location: 1900 W. Park Dr.-1280 Hitzfield St., Huntington, Indiana
- Coordinates: 40°53′12″N 85°30′55″W
- Area: 181 acres (73 ha)
- Built: 1925
- Architect: Steinbach, J.G.; Stevens, Robert W.
- Architectural style: Mission/spanish Revival, Renaissance
- NRHP reference No.: 04001311
- Added to NRHP: December 6, 2004

Victory Noll–St. Felix Friary Historic District is a historic Roman Catholic friary and national historic district located at Huntington, Indiana. The district encompasses 10 contributing buildings, five contributing sites, four contributing structures, and three contributing objects. While the friary was sold in 1980 to the Good Shepherd Church of the United Brethren in Christ, in 2010 John Tippman bought back the friary and donated it back to the Catholic Church. The friary is currently undergoing restorations.

It was listed on the National Register of Historic Places in 2004.
