= Hawley Heights Historic District =

Historic district in Indiana, United States

- U.S. National Register of Historic Places
- U.S. Historic district
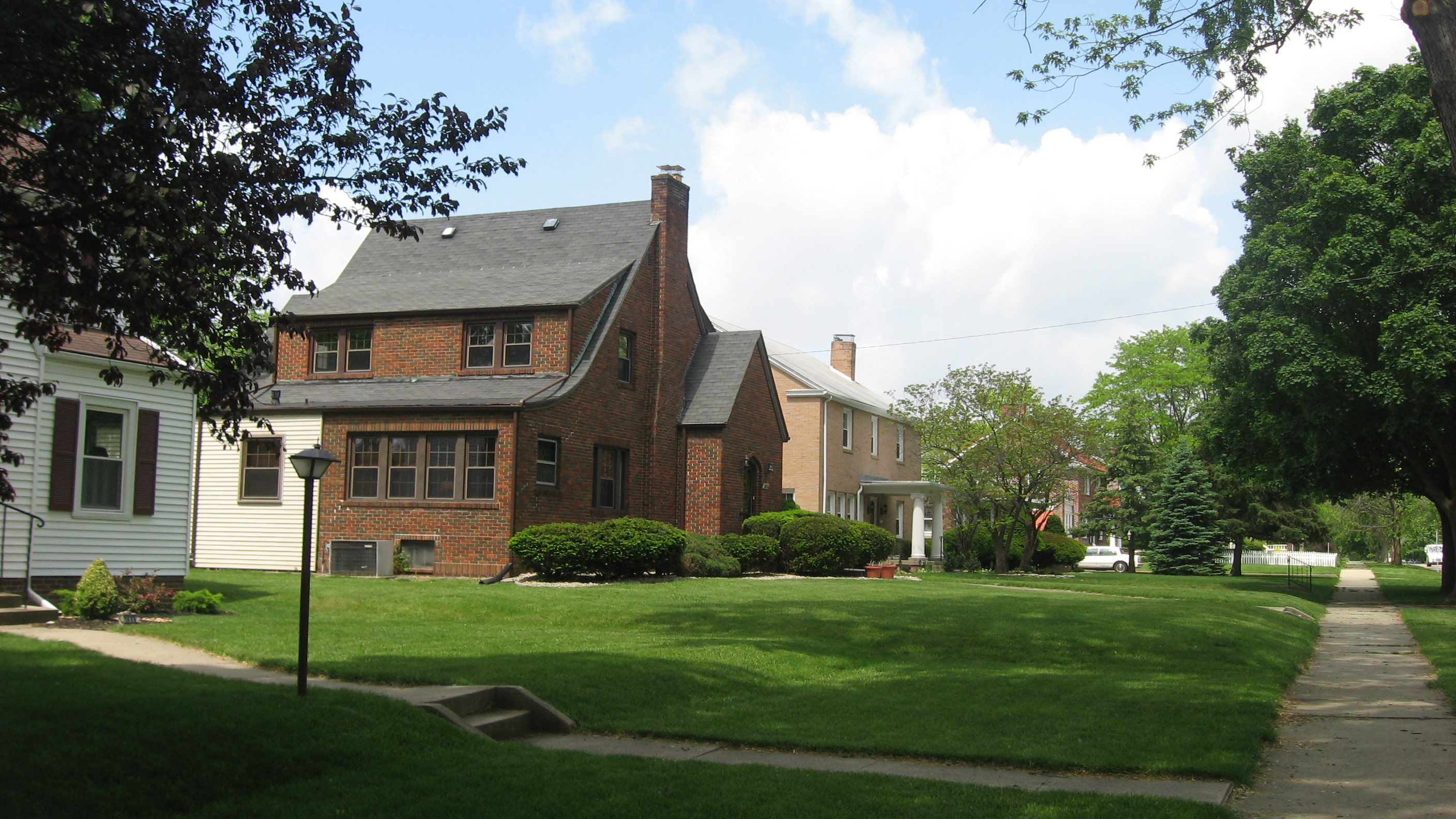
- Cherry Street in Hawley Heights, May 2012

- Location within Indiana Location within the United States
- Location: Generally bounded by Oak, MacGahan, Cherry, and Collins Sts., Huntington, Indiana
- Coordinates: 40°53′22″N 85°30′19″W
- Area: 30 acres (12 ha)
- Built: 1914
- Architect: Architects Small House Service; Sears, Roebuck & Co.
- Architectural style: Colonial Revival, Mission/spanish Revival, Tudor Revival, et al.
- NRHP reference No.: 03000983
- Added to NRHP: September 28, 2003

Hawley Heights Historic District is a national historic district located at Huntington, Indiana. The district includes 87 contributing buildings and seven contributing objects in an exclusively residential section of Huntington. It developed between about 1914 and 1954 and includes notable examples of Colonial Revival, Mission Revival, and Tudor Revival style architecture. A number of homes were built from plans prepared by the Architects Small House Service.

It was listed on the National Register of Historic Places in 2003.
