= St. Peter's First Community Church =

Historic church in Indiana, United States

- German Reformed Church
- U.S. National Register of Historic Places
- U.S. Historic district – Contributing property
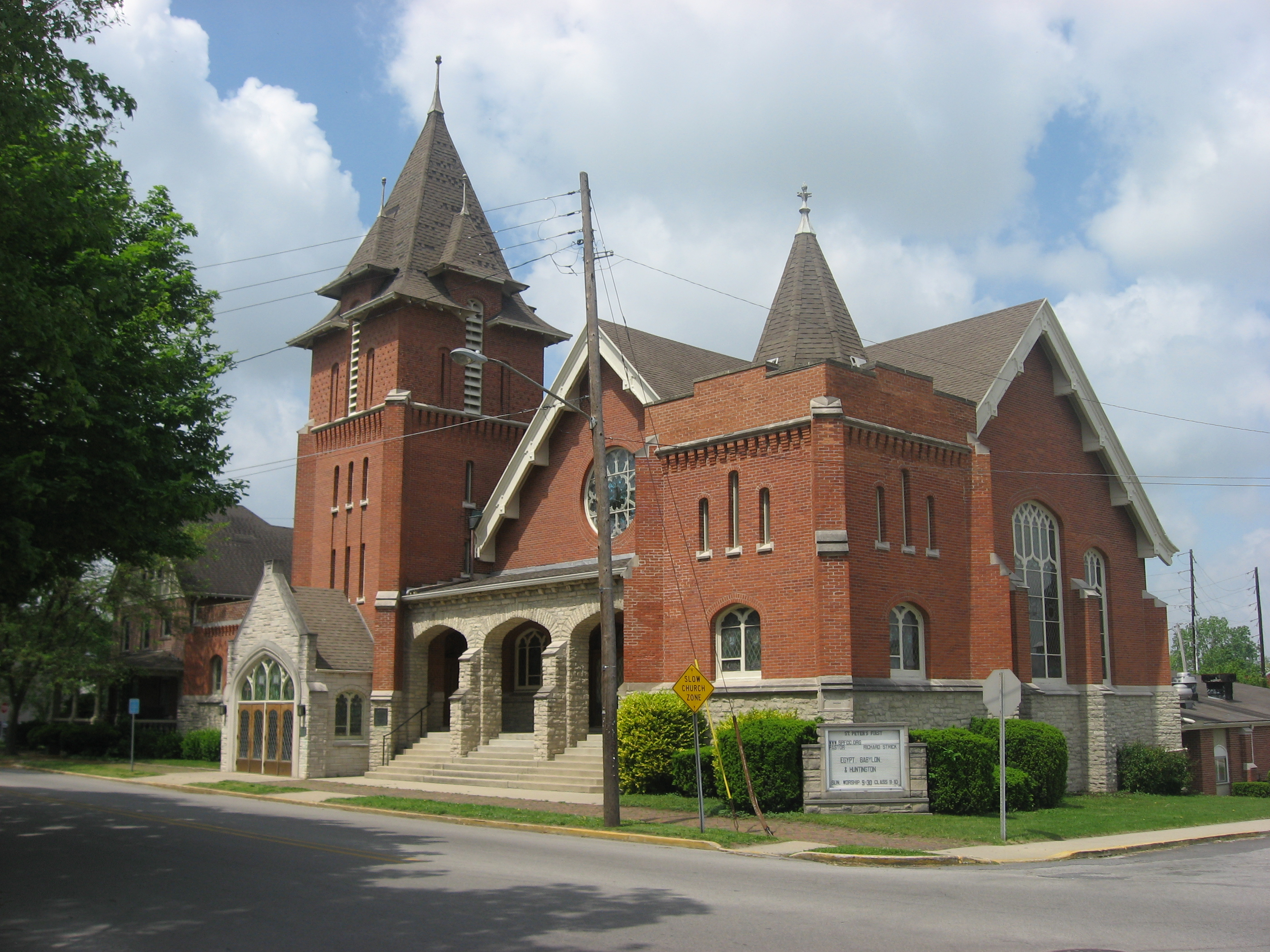
- St. Peter's First Community Church, May 2012

- Location within Indiana Location within the United States
- Location: 202 Etna Ave., Huntington, Indiana
- Coordinates: 40°52′40″N 85°29′38″W
- Area: 1 acre (0.40 ha)
- Built: 1903
- Architect: Stevens, Will A.; Lamont, Robert V.
- Architectural style: Late Victorian, Eclectic
- NRHP reference No.: 85000724
- Added to NRHP: April 11, 1985

St. Peter's First Community Church, also known as the German Reformed Church and St. Peter's United Church of Christ, is a historic church located at Huntington, Indiana. It was built in 1903, and is a red brick and limestone church building with an eclectic plan and Late Victorian design elements. It features a two-tiered central tower with angled buttresses, tall and narrow openings, and topped by a steep pyramidal bell-cast roof. Its stained glass windows include German language texts and an image of Christ's ascension. The building was designed by Will A. Stevens, a Huntington native who graduated from Cornell University in 1890.

It was listed on the National Register of Historic Places in 1985. It is located in the Drover Town Historic District.
