= North Jefferson Street Historic District =

Historic district in Indiana, United States

- U.S. National Register of Historic Places
- U.S. Historic district
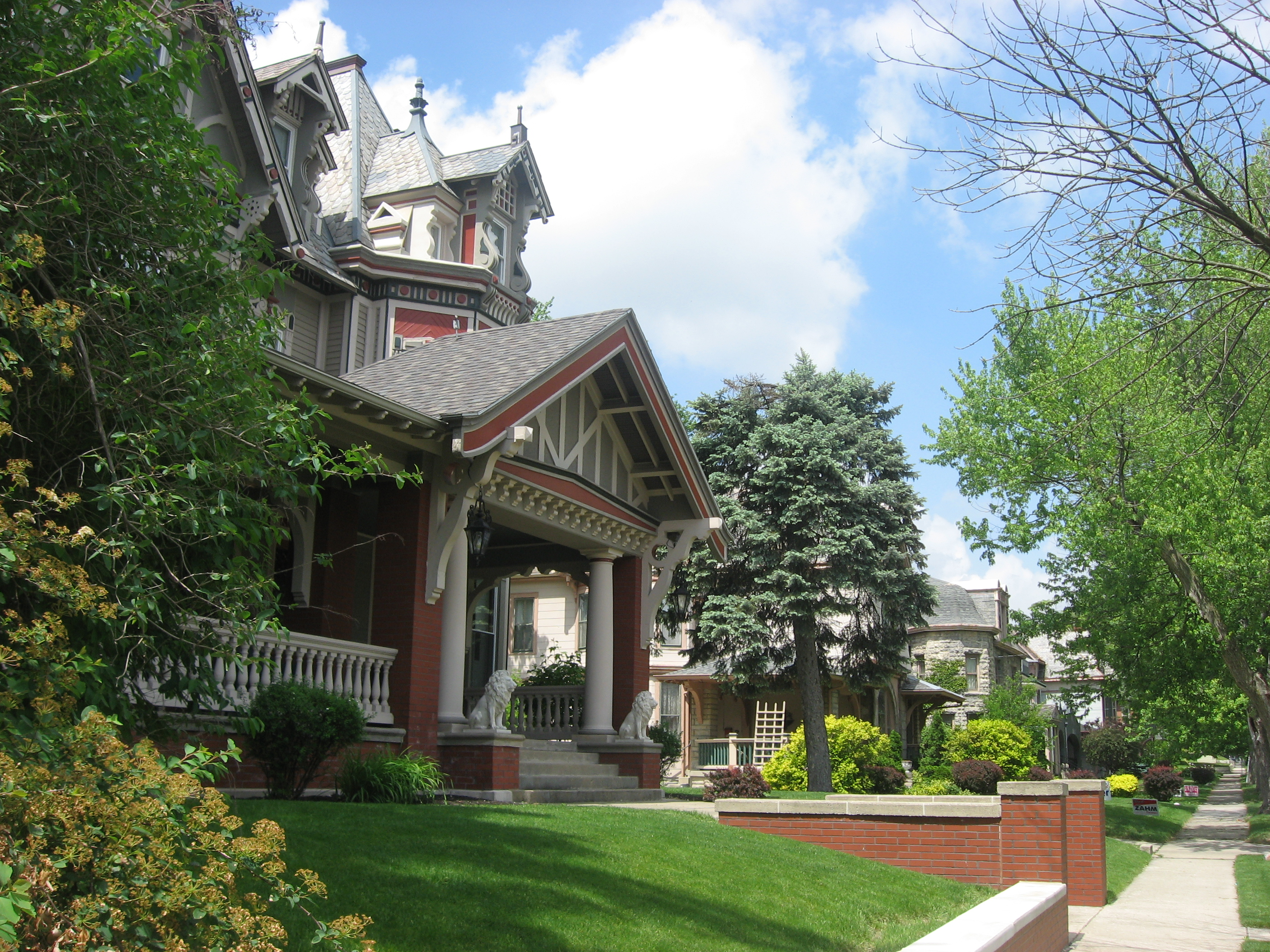
- Houses on Jefferson Street

- Location within Indiana Location within the United States
- Location: Roughly bounded by W. Park Dr. and College, Madison, Collins, Oak, Stephen, and Buchanan Sts., Huntington, Indiana
- Coordinates: 40°53′11″N 85°29′57″W
- Area: 320 acres (130 ha)
- Architect: Dunlap, Elmer
- Architectural style: Mid 19th Century Revival, Late Victorian
- NRHP reference No.: 10000123
- Added to NRHP: March 31, 2010

The North Jefferson Street Historic District is a national historic district located at Huntington, Indiana. It includes works by Elmer Dunlap. The listing includes approximately seven hundred contributing properties including the separately listed David Alonzo and Elizabeth Purviance House (1892; 809 N. Jefferson) and adjacent Taylor-Zent House (1898; 715 N. Jefferson), which are Chateauesque and Victorian Romanesque in style. The district was listed on the National Register of Historic Places in 2010.

North Jefferson Street, north of the downtown commercial area, was the premier residential street in Huntington from the 1860s on; large stylish homes were built on both sides of the street.

Good examples of Italianate architecture on the street include:

- Loughridge/Grayson House (1853), 708 N. Jefferson,
- William McGrew House (1863), 804 N. Jefferson, and
- John Roche House (1871), 939 N. Jefferson.

Jacobethan Revival architecture on the street included:

- Julius Dick House (1882), 1046 N. Jefferson,
- Jacob Dick House (1880), 1068 N. Jefferson, and
- Wesley Hawley House (1895), 1110 N. Jefferson.

Eastlake and Queen Anne architecture appears in:

- Will Ewing House (1890), 850 N. Jefferson and
- Herman H. Arnold House (1883), 1140 N. Jefferson.

Notable also is:

- Saint Mary's Church (1896), Victorian Romanesque, built of brick and stone masonry, Chateauesque and Victorian Romanesque in style.
