= David Alonzo and Elizabeth Purviance House =

Historic house in Indiana, United States

- U.S. National Register of Historic Places
- U.S. Historic district – Contributing property
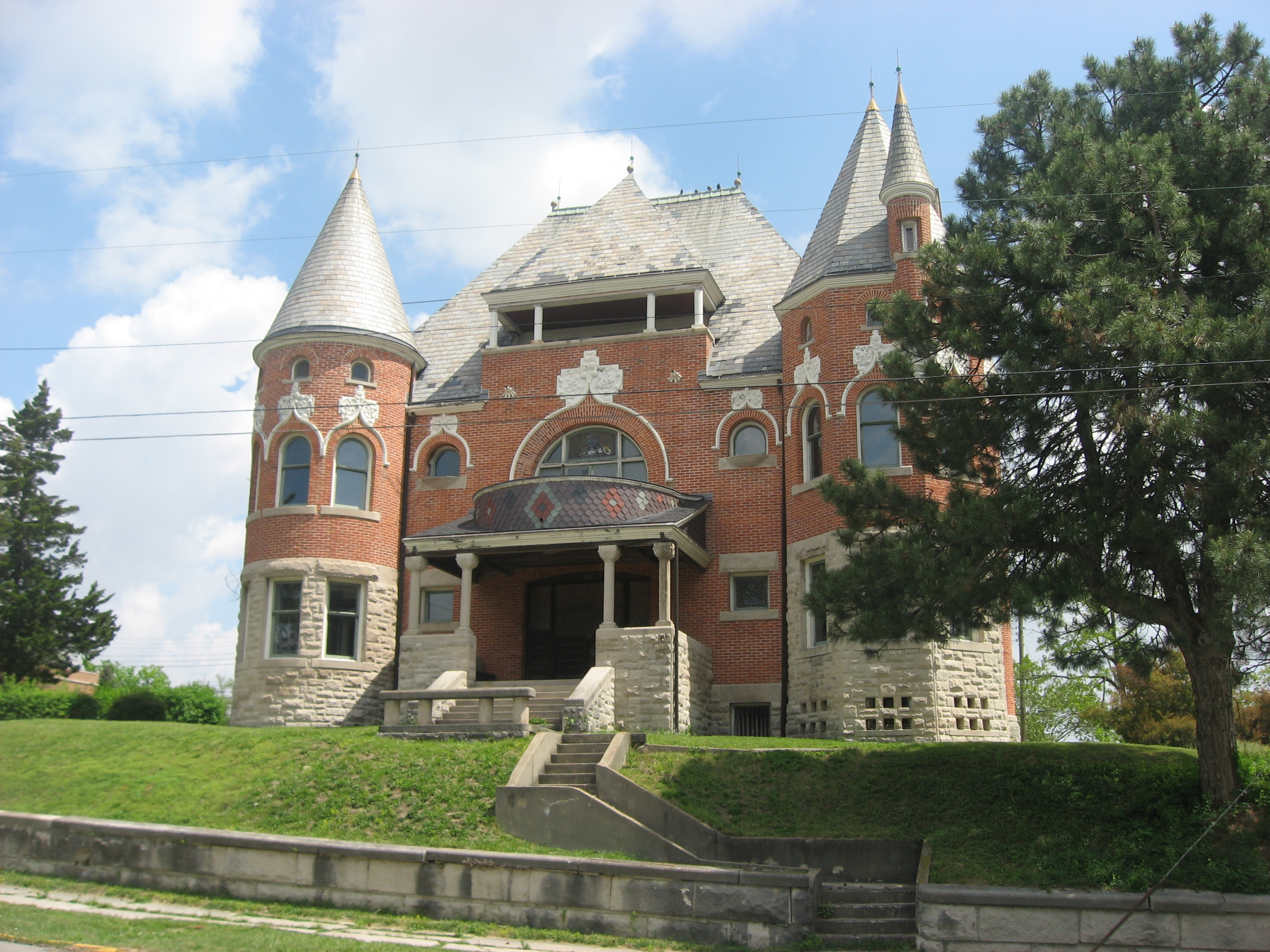
- David Alonzo and Elizabeth Purviance House, May 2012

- Location within Indiana Location within the United States
- Location: 809 N. Jefferson St., Huntington, Indiana
- Coordinates: 40°53′6″N 85°29′50″W
- Area: less than one acre
- Built: 1892
- Built by: Ufheil Brothers
- Architectural style: Romanesque
- NRHP reference No.: 94000225
- Added to NRHP: March 17, 1994

David Alonzo and Elizabeth Purviance House is a historic home located at Huntington, Indiana. It was built in 1892, and is a 2 1/2-story, Romanesque Revival / Châteauesque style brick and stone dwelling. It has a modified rectangular plan and is topped by a slate hipped roof. The house features two corner towers (one rounded and one octagonal), semicircular arches, varied window shapes and sizes, and pressed metal decoration.

It was listed on the National Register of Historic Places in 1994. It is located in the North Jefferson Street Historic District.
