= Drover Town Historic District =

Historic district in Indiana, United States

- U.S. National Register of Historic Places
- U.S. Historic district
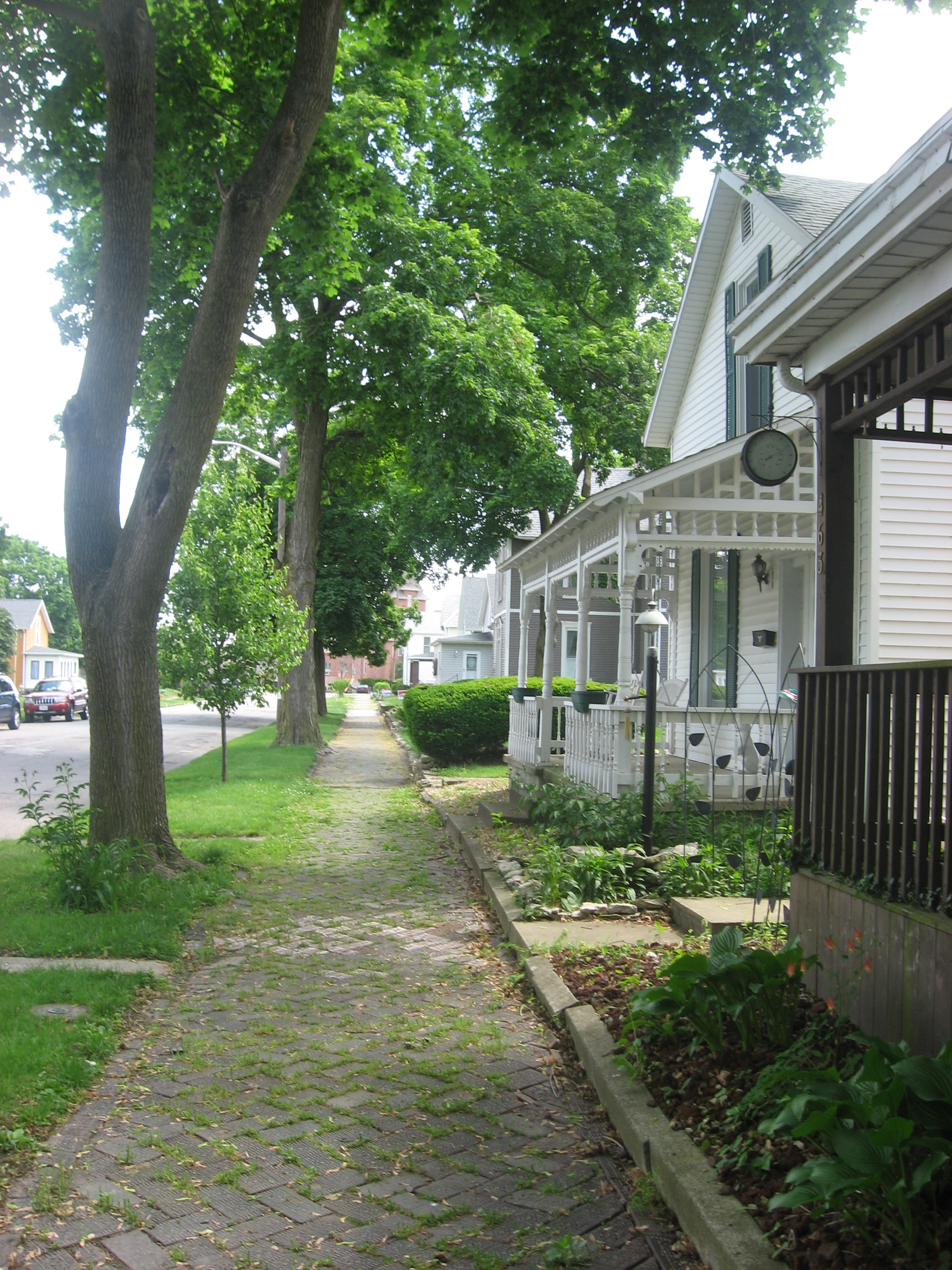
- William Street in Drover Town, May 2012

- Location within Indiana Location within the United States
- Location: Roughly bounded by the Little R, S. LaFontaine St., Olinger and Elm Sts., Ogan and Salamonie Ave. and Whitelock St., Huntington, Indiana
- Coordinates: 40°52′39″N 85°29′38″W
- Area: 75 acres (30 ha)
- Built: 1874
- Architectural style: Federal, Greek Revival, Gothic Revival, Italianate, Queen Anne
- NRHP reference No.: 06000852
- Added to NRHP: September 20, 2006

Drover Town Historic District is a national historic district located at Huntington, Indiana. The district includes 231 contributing buildings, two contributing structures, and one contributing object in a predominantly residential section of Huntington. It developed between about 1857 and 1930 and includes notable examples of Federal, Greek Revival, Gothic Revival, Italianate, and Queen Anne style architecture. Located in the district are the separately listed German Reformed Church, Samuel Purviance House, and William Street School. Other notable buildings include the William Drover House (c. 1880), John Rhoads House (1896), and Griffiths Block (1896). The area was founded by Prussian immigrant, Henry Dover in 1857.

It was listed on the National Register of Historic Places in 2006.
