= Huntington, Indiana =

City in Huntington County, Indiana, United States

- City
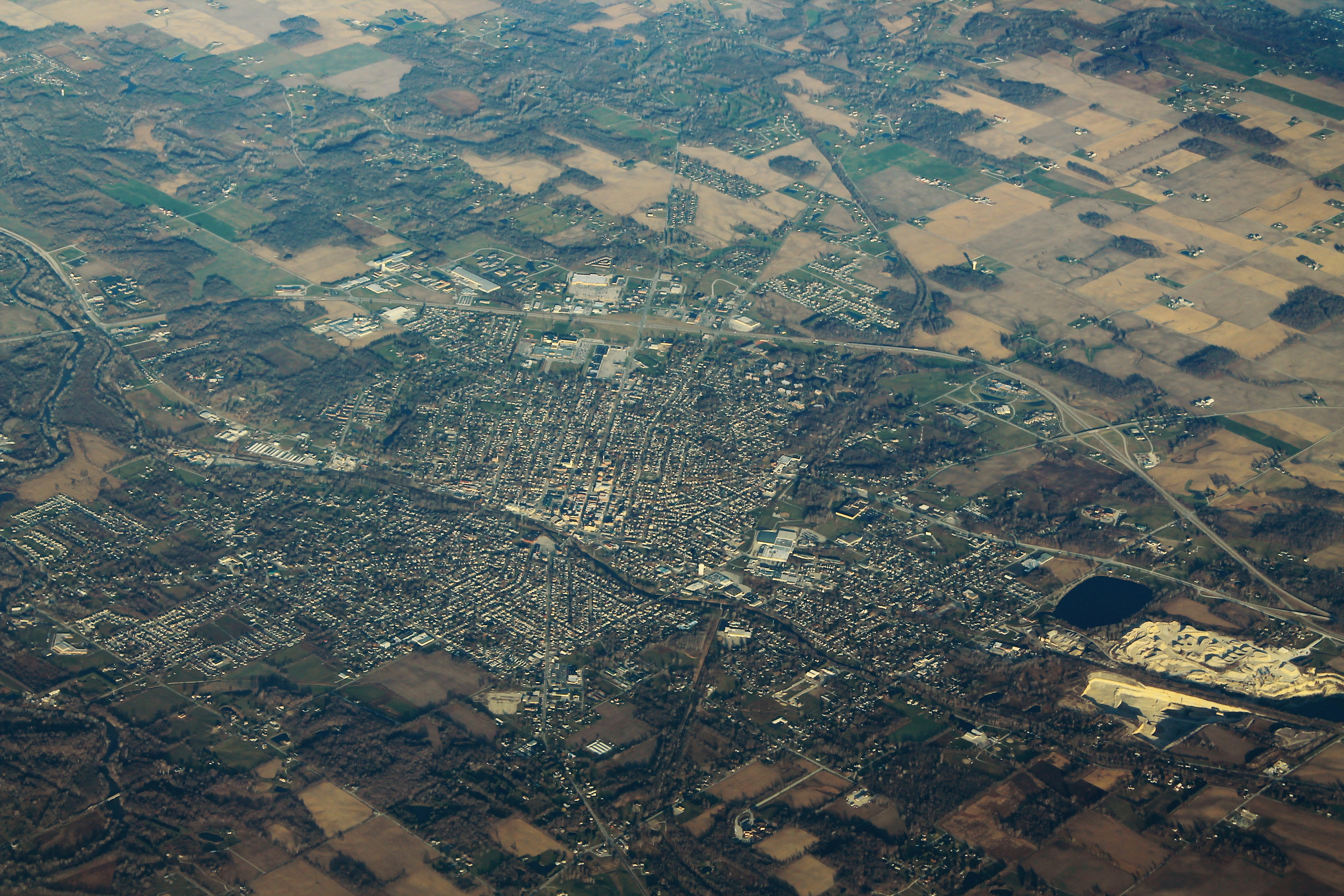
- Aerial view of Huntington

- Flag Seal
- Nickname: "The Lime City"
- Location of Huntington in Huntington County, Indiana
- Coordinates: 40°52′50″N 85°30′23″W
- Country: United States
- State: Indiana
- County: Huntington
- Named for: after Samuel Huntington

Government
  - Type: Mayor-council government
  - Mayor: Richard Strick (I)

Area
  - Total: 9.45 sq mi (24.47 km^{2})
  - Land: 9.31 sq mi (24.12 km^{2})
  - Water: 0.14 sq mi (0.35 km^{2})
- Elevation: 791 ft (241 m)

Population (2020)
  - Total: 17,022
  - Density: 1,828.0/sq mi (705.81/km^{2})
- Time zone: UTC−5 (EST)
  - Summer (DST): UTC−4 (EDT)
- ZIP Code: 46750
- Area code: 260
- FIPS code: 18-35302
- GNIS feature ID: 2394452
- Website: www.huntington.in.us/city

Huntington, known as the "Lime City", is the largest city in and the county seat of Huntington County, Indiana, United States. It is in Huntington and Union townships. It is also part of Fort Wayne, Indiana's metropolitan area. The population was 17,022 at the 2020 United States census, down from 17,391 in the 2010 United States census.

== History ==
=== Name ===
Huntington was named by Captain Elias Murray, a member of the legislature. The name Huntington is derived from Samuel Huntington, a judge, politician, and patriot in the American Revolution. Samuel Huntington is also known for being the third governor of Connecticut and the seventh president of the Continental Congress. Being a delegate to the Second Continental Congress, Huntington took part in voting for and signing the Declaration of Independence and the Articles of Confederation.

=== Early settlement ===
The county of Huntington was formally organized on December 2, 1834. The city of Huntington was first established by a group of pioneers, most notably Captain Elias Murray. By 1849, Huntington contained 150 houses and a population of 700.

=== Historical literature ===
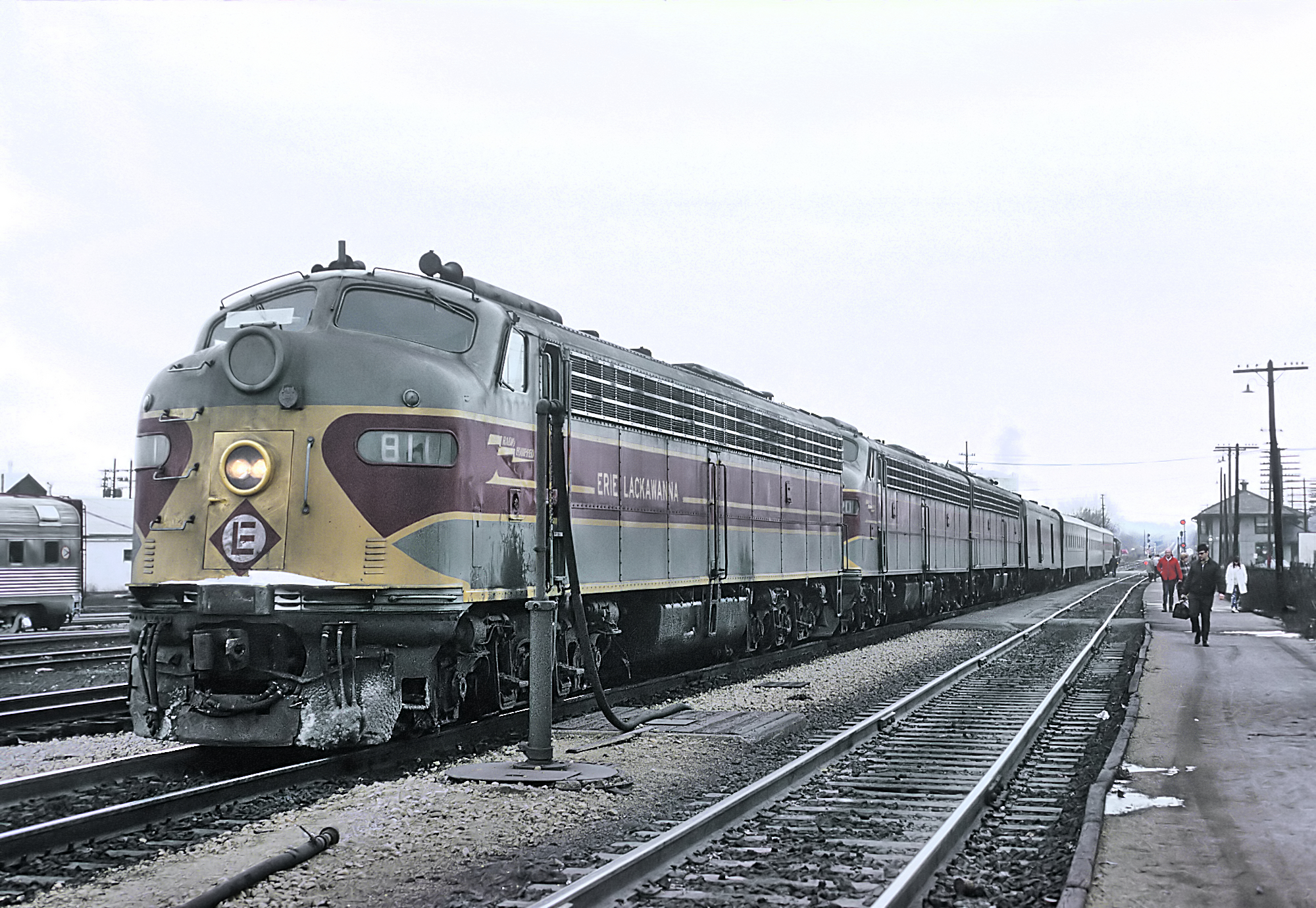
The Lake Cities, stopped at Huntington, Indiana, on December 21, 1969

A small number of books have been published about the history of Huntington County, the first being History of Huntington County, Indiana originally published by Brant & Fuller. Two other books about Huntington include History of Huntington County, IN by Frank Sumner Bash in 1914 (describing its historical progress, its people, and its principal interests) and Huntington County, IN: Histories and Families by Turner Publishing Company in 1993 as a result of the Huntington County Historical Society officers and board of directors meeting in summer 1992 to discuss the family history of Huntington, the glue that has held together the city and county of Huntington in the heartland of the Midwest for more than 175 years.

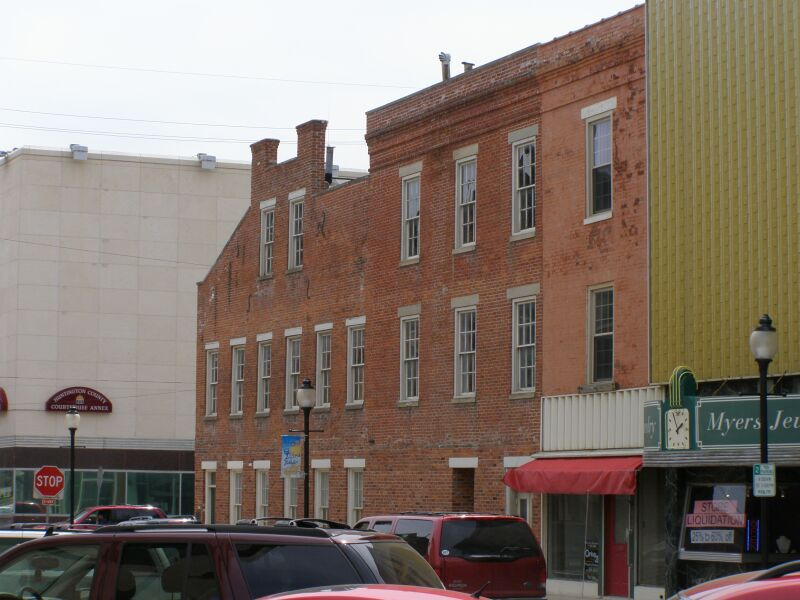
Buildings that once sat along the Wabash and Erie Canal. Foreground was once a boat basin.

=== Wabash and Erie Canal ===
The Wabash and Erie Canal was constructed through Huntington County in 1834 and added a major economic benefit to the area. In addition to the Wabash River cutting through Huntington (see Forks of the Wabash), this newly opened trade route accelerated the population and economic growth in Huntington.

== Geography ==
Huntington is located on the Wabash River. According to the 2010 census, Huntington has a total area of 8.844 square miles (22.91 km^{2}), of which 8.71 square miles (22.56 km^{2}) (or 98.48%) is land and 0.134 square miles (0.35 km^{2}) (or 1.52%) is water.

=== Climate ===
Climate data for Huntington, Indiana (1991–2020 normals, extremes 1893–present)
Month	Jan	Feb	Mar	Apr	May	Jun	Jul	Aug	Sep	Oct	Nov	Dec	Year
Record high °F (°C)	66 (19)	75 (24)	86 (30)	91 (33)	97 (36)	106 (41)	110 (43)	105 (41)	103 (39)	94 (34)	81 (27)	71 (22)	110 (43)
Mean maximum °F (°C)	56.0 (13.3)	59.4 (15.2)	70.6 (21.4)	80.9 (27.2)	88.6 (31.4)	93.0 (33.9)	93.6 (34.2)	92.5 (33.6)	90.4 (32.4)	82.9 (28.3)	69.1 (20.6)	58.6 (14.8)	94.5 (34.7)
Mean daily maximum °F (°C)	33.3 (0.7)	37.0 (2.8)	48.0 (8.9)	61.4 (16.3)	72.6 (22.6)	81.1 (27.3)	84.4 (29.1)	82.6 (28.1)	76.8 (24.9)	64.2 (17.9)	50.0 (10.0)	38.2 (3.4)	60.8 (16.0)
Daily mean °F (°C)	25.2 (−3.8)	27.9 (−2.3)	37.4 (3.0)	49.3 (9.6)	60.4 (15.8)	69.7 (20.9)	73.0 (22.8)	71.1 (21.7)	64.2 (17.9)	52.3 (11.3)	40.5 (4.7)	30.4 (−0.9)	50.1 (10.1)
Mean daily minimum °F (°C)	17.0 (−8.3)	18.7 (−7.4)	26.9 (−2.8)	37.1 (2.8)	48.2 (9.0)	58.3 (14.6)	61.7 (16.5)	59.6 (15.3)	51.6 (10.9)	40.3 (4.6)	31.0 (−0.6)	22.7 (−5.2)	39.4 (4.1)
Mean minimum °F (°C)	−4.2 (−20.1)	0.0 (−17.8)	10.2 (−12.1)	22.8 (−5.1)	33.1 (0.6)	44.0 (6.7)	50.9 (10.5)	49.2 (9.6)	38.3 (3.5)	27.1 (−2.7)	16.9 (−8.4)	4.5 (−15.3)	−7.9 (−22.2)
Record low °F (°C)	−28 (−33)	−18 (−28)	−11 (−24)	6 (−14)	24 (−4)	34 (1)	42 (6)	35 (2)	26 (−3)	15 (−9)	−5 (−21)	−24 (−31)	−28 (−33)
Average precipitation inches (mm)	2.49 (63)	2.18 (55)	2.66 (68)	3.95 (100)	4.71 (120)	4.61 (117)	4.48 (114)	3.66 (93)	3.25 (83)	3.00 (76)	3.25 (83)	2.38 (60)	40.62 (1,032)
Average snowfall inches (cm)	9.9 (25)	6.7 (17)	2.8 (7.1)	0.4 (1.0)	0.0 (0.0)	0.0 (0.0)	0.0 (0.0)	0.0 (0.0)	0.0 (0.0)	0.0 (0.0)	1.0 (2.5)	5.1 (13)	25.9 (66)
Average precipitation days (≥ 0.01 in)	11.1	8.3	9.7	12.0	12.2	11.8	10.3	9.0	8.3	9.8	10.1	9.8	122.4
Average snowy days (≥ 0.1 in)	5.3	4.0	1.8	0.3	0.0	0.0	0.0	0.0	0.0	0.0	0.7	3.4	15.5
Source: NOAA

== Demographics ==
Historical population
Census	Pop.	Note	%±
1850	594		—
1860	1,664		180.1%
1870	2,925		75.8%
1880	3,863		32.1%
1890	7,328		89.7%
1900	9,491		29.5%
1910	10,272		8.2%
1920	14,000		36.3%
1930	13,420		−4.1%
1940	13,903		3.6%
1950	15,079		8.5%
1960	16,185		7.3%
1970	16,217		0.2%
1980	16,202		−0.1%
1990	16,389		1.2%
2000	17,450		6.5%
2010	17,391		−0.3%
2020	17,022		−2.1%
U.S. Decennial Census

=== 2020 census ===
As of the 2020 census, Huntington had a population of 17,022. The median age was 37.4 years. 22.4% of residents were under the age of 18 and 17.0% of residents were 65 years of age or older. For every 100 females there were 91.0 males, and for every 100 females age 18 and over there were 88.7 males age 18 and over.

98.2% of residents lived in urban areas, while 1.8% lived in rural areas.

There were 6,890 households in Huntington, of which 28.2% had children under the age of 18 living in them. Of all households, 39.6% were married-couple households, 20.1% were households with a male householder and no spouse or partner present, and 31.3% were households with a female householder and no spouse or partner present. About 34.4% of all households were made up of individuals and 14.7% had someone living alone who was 65 years of age or older.

There were 7,768 housing units, of which 11.3% were vacant. The homeowner vacancy rate was 2.9% and the rental vacancy rate was 11.1%.

Racial composition as of the 2020 census
Race	Number	Percent
White	15,586	91.6%
Black or African American	153	0.9%
American Indian and Alaska Native	114	0.7%
Asian	111	0.7%
Native Hawaiian and Other Pacific Islander	4	0.0%
Some other race	231	1.4%
Two or more races	823	4.8%
Hispanic or Latino (of any race)	657	3.9%

=== 2010 census ===
As of the census of 2010, there were 17,391 people, 6,566 households, and 4,197 families living in the city. The population density was 1,996.7 inhabitants per square mile (770.9/km^{2}). There were 7,487 housing units at an average density of 859.6 per square mile (331.9/km^{2}). The racial makeup of the city was 96.4% White, 0.6% African American, 0.4% Native American, 0.5% Asian, 0.6% from other races, and 1.4% from two or more races. Hispanic or Latino of any race were 2.4% of the population.

There were 6,566 households, of which 34.1% had children under the age of 18 living with them, 45.2% were married couples living together, 13.3% had a female householder with no husband present, 5.4% had a male householder with no wife present, and 36.1% were non-families. Of all households 30.4% were made up of individuals, and 12.5% had someone living alone who was 65 years of age or older. The average household size was 2.48 and the average family size was 3.06.

The median age in the city was 33.4 years. 24.8% of residents were under the age of 18; 13.5% were between the ages of 18 and 24; 25.5% were from 25 to 44; 22.5% were from 45 to 64; and 13.5% were 65 years of age or older. The gender makeup of the city was 47.7% male and 52.3% female.

=== 2000 census ===
As of the census of 2000, there were 17,450 people, 6,717 households, and 4,419 families living in the city. The population density was 2,091.0 inhabitants per square mile (807.3/km^{2}). There were 7,262 housing units at an average density of 870.2 per square mile (336.0/km^{2}). The main religion is Roman Catholic, with around 42% of the city attending masses. The racial makeup of the city was 97.83% White, 0.21% African American, 0.45% Native American, 0.45% Asian, 0.02% Pacific Islander, 0.30% from other races, and 0.73% from two or more races. Hispanic or Latino of any race were 1.12% of the population.

There were 6,717 households, out of which 33.5% had children under the age of 18 living with them, 48.9% were married couples living together, 12.4% had a female householder with no husband present, and 34.2% were non-families. Of all households 29.0% were made up of individuals, and 12.0% had someone living alone who was 65 years of age or older. The average household size was 2.46 and the average family size was 3.03.

In the city, the population was spread out, with 26.2% under the age of 18, 12.9% from 18 to 24, 28.2% from 25 to 44, 18.9% from 45 to 64, and 13.8% who were 65 years of age or older. The median age was 33 years. For every 100 females, there were 91.5 males. For every 100 females age 18 and over, there were 87.3 males.

The median income for a household in the city was $45,600, and the median income for a family was $56,454. Males had a median income of $35,830 versus $26,921 for females. The per capita income for the city was $21,242. About 5.2% of families and 7.1% of the population were below the poverty line, including 8.2% of those under age 18 and 6.4% of those age 65 or over.

== Schools ==
The Huntington County Community School Corporation serves the city of Huntington and all of Huntington County. The corporation's lone high school, Huntington North High School, is located in Huntington. The two corporation middle schools, Crestview Middle School, Riverview Middle School, and three of the five elementary schools lie just outside the city limits. The elementary schools include Flint Springs, Horace Mann, Lincoln, Roanoke, and Salamonie. Private schools include Huntington Catholic School operated by the Roman Catholic Church.

The town has a lending library, the Huntington City-Township Public Library.

== Economy ==
Catholic publisher Our Sunday Visitor is based in Huntington.

== Communications ==
=== Local radio stations ===
- WJCI FM 102.9
- WBZQ AM 1300 La Jefa Radio (Spanish)
- WVSH FM 91.9 The Edge, high school station (Huntington North High School)
- WQHU FM 105.5 FUSE FM, Huntington University

== Transportation ==
Huntington Municipal Airport, a small airport for general aviation, lies southeast of the city. The Huntington Municipal Airport is a private airport. It is also used for some special events like Touch a Truck. It is small with one runway and 2 hangars, with a small main building. The city has no public transport buses.

Note: The planes are usually small and most flights are test runs or small trips.

Several highways serve the city:

- US 24
- US 224
- SR 5
- SR 9

== Notable people ==
=== Sports ===
- Gary Dilley, swimmer, Olympic silver medalist
- Dusty Fahrnow, Indy Car driver
- Josh Hart, NHRA race car driver
- Lauren Johnson, professional runner
- Harry Mehre, football player
- E. J. Tackett, professional bowler on the PBA Tour
- Addison Wiley, American middle-distance runner
- Gene Hartley, Indy car driver, raced in multiple Indianapolis 500 races.

=== Politics ===
- U. S. Lesh, 24th Indiana Attorney General
- Lambdin P. Milligan, Civil War-era insurrectionist
- Dan Quayle, former vice president of the United States, U.S. senator, U.S. representative
- J. Edward Roush, U.S. representative, father of "911 Emergency System"
- James R. Slack, state senator and Civil War general
- Andy Zay, member of the Indiana Senate, Known for making the fried tenderloin sandwich the official sandwich of the state of Indiana.

=== Other ===
- Dan Butler, actor
- Elizebeth (Smith) Friedman (1892–1980), author and pioneer in cryptology
- Jennifer Lancaster, author
- Mick Mars, guitarist of Mötley Crüe
- John F. Noll, archbishop and newspaper founder
- Brian Peck, sex offender, former actor, dialogue coach, director and producer
- Carrie M. Shoaff (1849–1939), artist, author, potter, playwright, correspondent
- Richard Leroy Walters, homeless philanthropist

== Points of interest ==
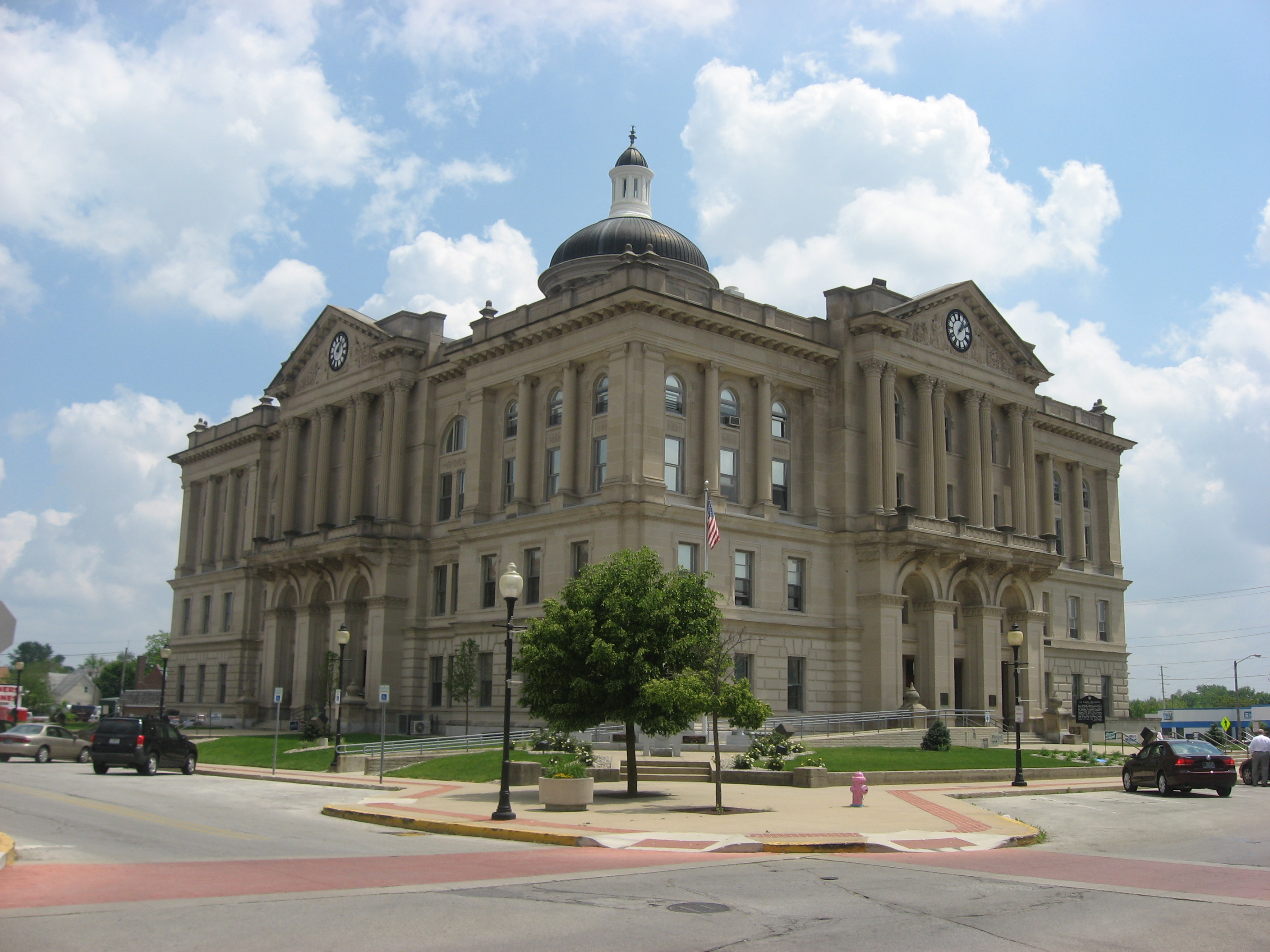
Huntington County Courthouse

- Church of the United Brethren in Christ National Headquarters
- David Alonzo and Elizabeth Purviance House
- Drover Town Historic District
- Forks of the Wabash
- Hawley Heights Historic District
- Hotel LaFontaine
- Huntington County Historical Museum
- Huntington Courthouse Square Historic District
- Huntington University Arboretum and Botanical Garden
- Huntington University
- J. Edward Roush Lake
- Merillat Centre for the Arts
- Moore/Carlew Building
- North Jefferson Street Historic District
- Old Plat Historic District
- Our Sunday Visitor
- Quayle Vice Presidential Learning Center
- Samuel Purviance House
- St. Peter's First Community Church
- Sheets Wildlife Museum and Learning Center
- Sunken Gardens
- Taylor-Zent House
- The Indiana Room Genealogy Center
- Victory Noll-St. Felix Friary Historic District
- William Street School
