= Indiana State Road 116 =

State highway in Indiana, United States

State Road 116
- SR 116 highlighted in red

Route information
- Maintained by INDOT
- Length: 31.703 mi (51.021 km)

Major junctions
- West end: US 224 in Markle
- East end: US 27 in Geneva

Location
- Country: United States
- State: Indiana
- Counties: Adams, Huntington, Wells

Highway system
- Indiana State Highway System; Interstate; US; State; Scenic
← SR 115	→ SR 117

State Road 116 (SR 116) is a State Road in the northern section of the US state of Indiana. Running for about 32 miles (51 km) in a general southeast–northwest direction and it is signed east–west. The road connects Markle, Bluffton, and Geneva and passes through mostly farmland outside of cities and towns. SR 116 was originally introduced in the early 1930s routed between Markle and SR 3 north of Bluffton. The road was extended southeast to U.S. Highway 27 (US 27) in the late 1930s and early 1940s. In the mid-1940s the road was extended east to the Ohio state line, near New Corydon. This extension was removed between late 1990s and early 2000s, the east end of SR 116 was truncated to its current location at US 27.

== Route description ==
SR 116 begins at an intersection with US 224, in the town of Markle. It heads southeast passing through Markle having an intersection with SR 3. East of SR 3, SR 116 leaves Huntington County and enters Wells County, before leaving Markle. East of Markle the road rural Wells County heading east-southeast, parallel to the Wabash River, and passing through farmland. SR 116 has an intersection with SR 124, the two state roads head east concurrent entering Bluffton.

In Bluffton the road crosses a railroad track before and intersection with SR 1 (Main Street). Both state roads turn south onto SR 1 passing through commercial properties before SR 124 turns east, while SR 116 continues south on Main Street with SR 1. The street crosses over the Wabash River, where SR 116 has its highest traffic count with a count of 22,793 vehicles on average daily in 2016. SR 1 and SR 116 enters downtown Bluffton, where the street passes east of the Wells County Courthouse. South of the courthouse the road passes through residential properties before the properties become commercial. SR 116 turns east while SR 1 continues south. SR 116 passes south of Metropolitan School District Bluffton-Harrison buildings before leaving Bluffton.

Past Bluffton the road bends to become southeast–northwest, parallel to the Wabash River and south of the Ouabache State Park. Southwest of Vera Cruz SR 116 has an intersection with SR 301 before leaving Wells County and entering Adams County. In Adams County SR 116 has an intersection with SR 218 before the road curves to become north–south, passing west of Linn Grove. The road heads south for around 4 miles before the road turns to become east–west passing through agriculture land. This segment of SR 116 has the lowest traffic count of the entire length of the state road at 803 vehicles on average daily in 2016. SR 116 enters Geneva, passing through residential properties, before the SR 116 designation ends at US 27.

== History ==
SR 116 was originally designated between late 1930 and early 1932. The highway ran between SR 16 in Markle and SR 3, now SR 1, north of Bluffton. Between 1935 and 1936 the original segment of SR 116 was under construction to become to come paved. The road was extended east to Wells County State Forest, now Ouabache State Park, between 1936 and 1937. The Indiana State Highway Commission moved the road south between Bluffton and Wells County State Forest between 1939 and 1941. At this time an extension of SR 116 to the southeast occurred moving the eastern end to US 27 in Geneva. The road was extended east to the Ohio state line east of New Corydon, between 1942 and 1945. Between 1966 and 1967 the entire road east of Bluffton was paved. A short reroute on the southeast part of Bluffton to its modern routing occurred between 1993 and 1995. SR 116 east of US 27 was removed from the state road system between 1999 and 2000.

== Major intersections ==
County	Location	mi	km	Destinations	Notes
Huntington	Markle	0.000	0.000	US 224	Western terminus of SR 116
Huntington	Markle	0.635	1.022	SR 3	
Wells	Bluffton	11.208	18.038	SR 124 west	Western end of SR 124 concurrency
Wells	Bluffton	11.980	19.280	SR 1 north	Northern end of SR 1 concurrency
Wells	Bluffton	12.979	20.888	SR 124 east – Ouabache State Park	Eastern end of SR 124 concurrency
Wells	Bluffton	14.524	23.374	SR 1 south	Southern end of SR 1 concurrency
Wells	Harrison Township	19.467	31.329	SR 301 north – Vera Cruz	
Adams	Hartford Township	22.938	36.915	SR 218	
Adams	Geneva	31.703	51.021	US 27	Eastern terminus of SR 116
1.000 mi = 1.609 km; 1.000 km = 0.621 mi: Concurrency terminus
