= National Register of Historic Places listings in Wells County, Indiana =

Location of Wells County in Indiana

This is a list of the National Register of Historic Places listings in Wells County, Indiana.

This is intended to be a complete list of the properties and districts on the National Register of Historic Places in Wells County, Indiana, United States. Latitude and longitude coordinates are provided for many National Register properties and districts; these locations may be seen together in a map.

There are five properties and districts listed on the National Register in the county. Another property was once listed but has been removed.

Properties and districts located in incorporated areas display the name of the municipality, while properties and districts in unincorporated areas display the name of their civil township. Properties and districts split between multiple jurisdictions display the names of all jurisdictions.

This National Park Service list is complete through NPS recent listings posted December 19, 2025.

== Current listings ==
| | Name on the Register | Image | Date listed | Location | City or town | Description |
|---|---|---|---|---|---|---|
| 1 | Bethel Methodist Episcopal Church | Bethel Methodist Episcopal Church | March 1, 1984 (#84001747) | Southeast of Bluffton; 40°41′56″N 85°08′09″W | Harrison Township | |
| 2 | Bluffton Commercial Historic District | Bluffton Commercial Historic District | October 15, 2020 (#100004049) | Roughly bounded by Wabash, Scott, Elm, and Marion Sts. 40°44′23″N 85°10′17″W | Bluffton | |
| 3 | Stewart-Studebaker House | Stewart-Studebaker House | May 14, 1979 (#79000027) | 420 W. Market St. 40°44′22″N 85°10′33″W | Bluffton | |
| 4 | Villa North Historic District | Villa North Historic District | June 4, 1985 (#85001192) | 706-760 and 707-731 N. Main St. 40°44′58″N 85°10′08″W | Bluffton | |
| 4 | Wells County Courthouse | Wells County Courthouse | January 15, 1979 (#79000028) | 100 W. Market St. 40°44′22″N 85°10′19″W | Bluffton | |

== Former listing ==
| | Name on the Register | Image | Date listed | Date removed | Location | City or town | Description |
|---|---|---|---|---|---|---|---|
| 1 | John A. Grove House | | December 22, 1983 (#83000045) | July 14, 2011 | 521 W. Market St. 40°44′24″N 85°10′38″W | Bluffton | Destroyed by fire on January 30, 2008. |

== See also ==
- List of National Historic Landmarks in Indiana
- National Register of Historic Places listings in Indiana
- Listings in neighboring counties: Adams, Allen, Blackford, Grant, Huntington, Jay
- List of Indiana state historical markers in Wells County
