= Northern Indiana =

Geographic and cultural region of Indiana, United States

Coordinates: 41°10′N 86°0′W

- Region
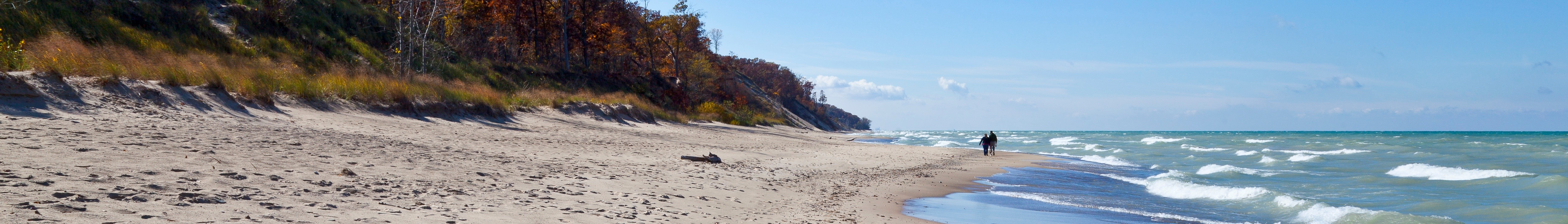
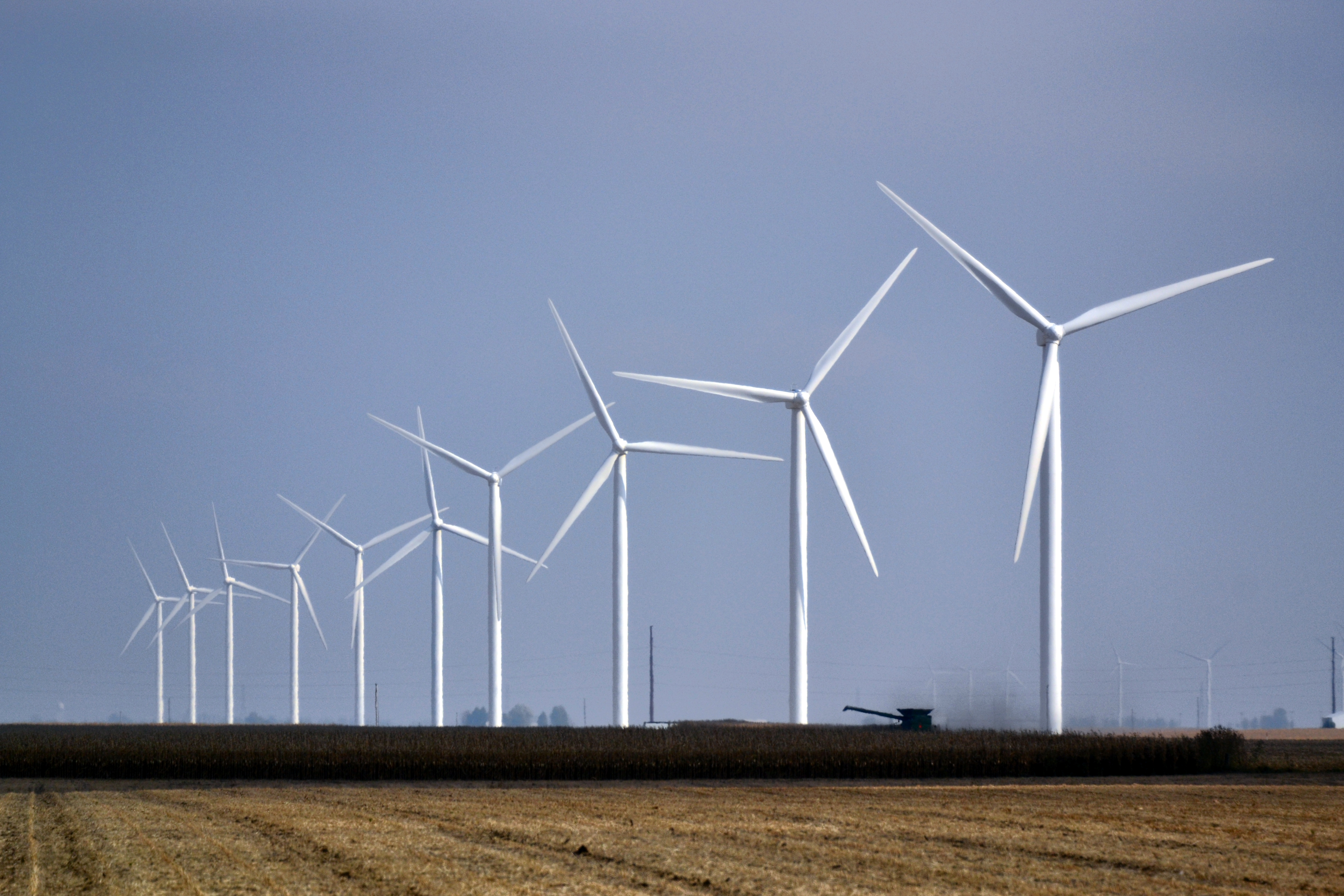
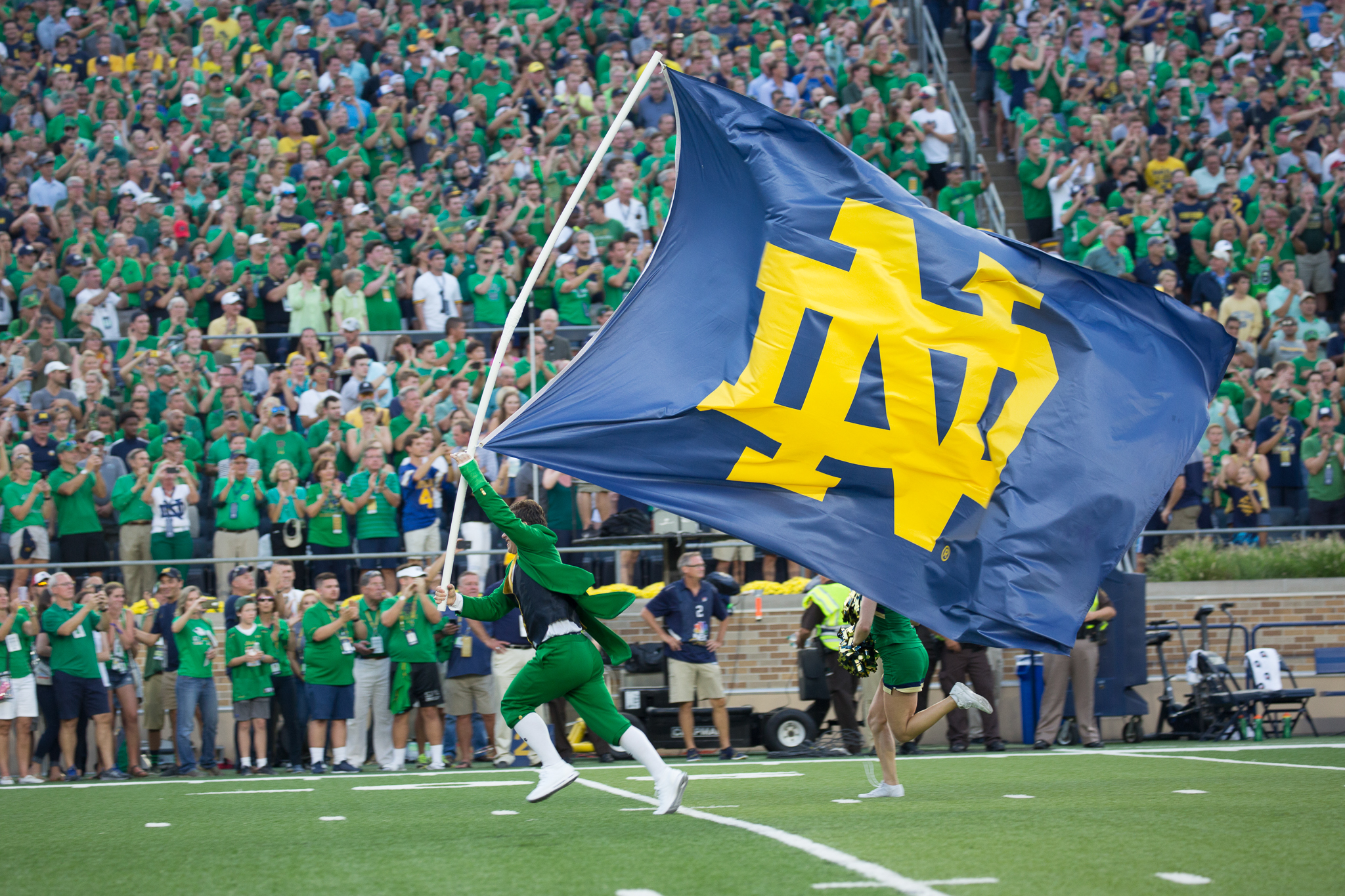
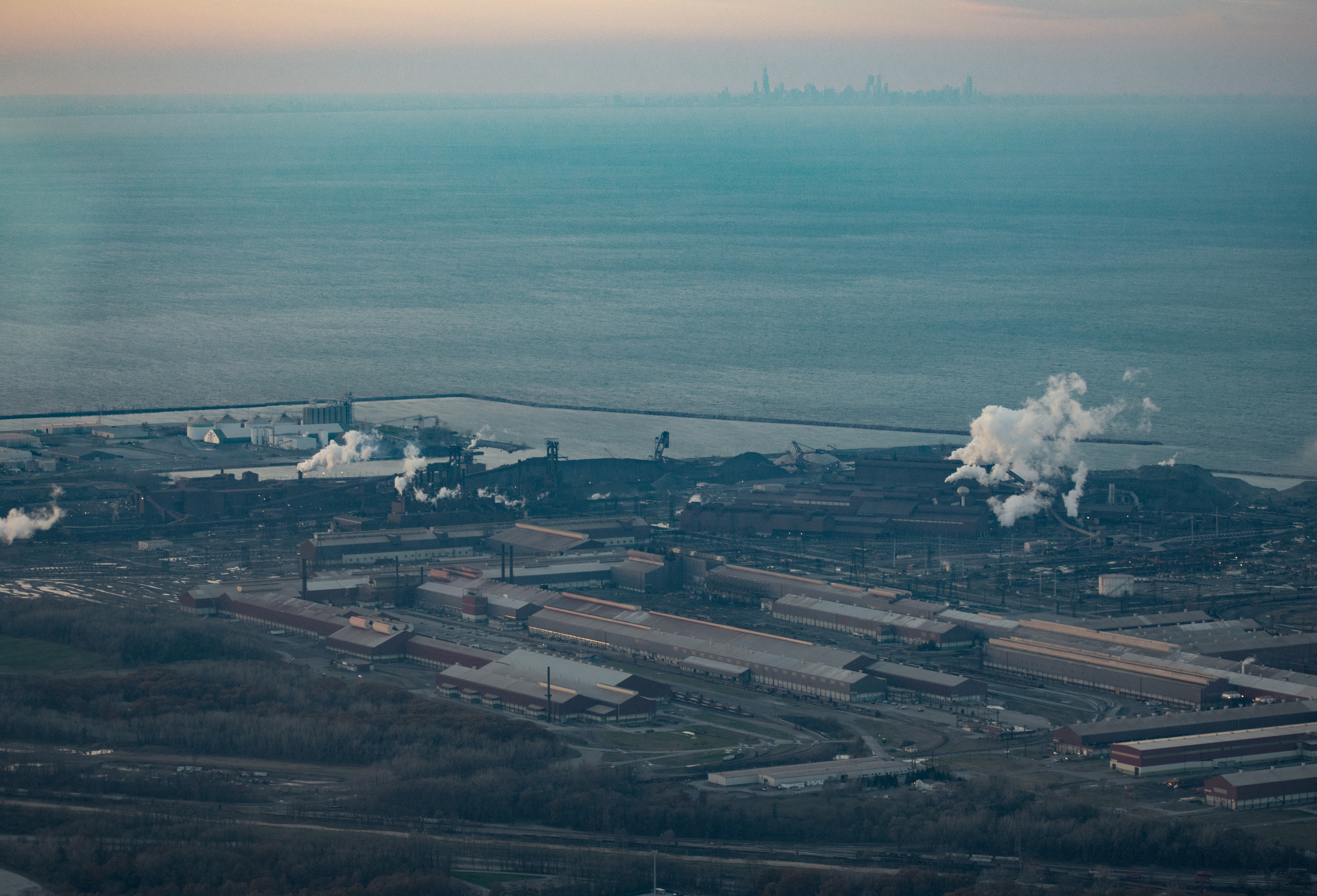
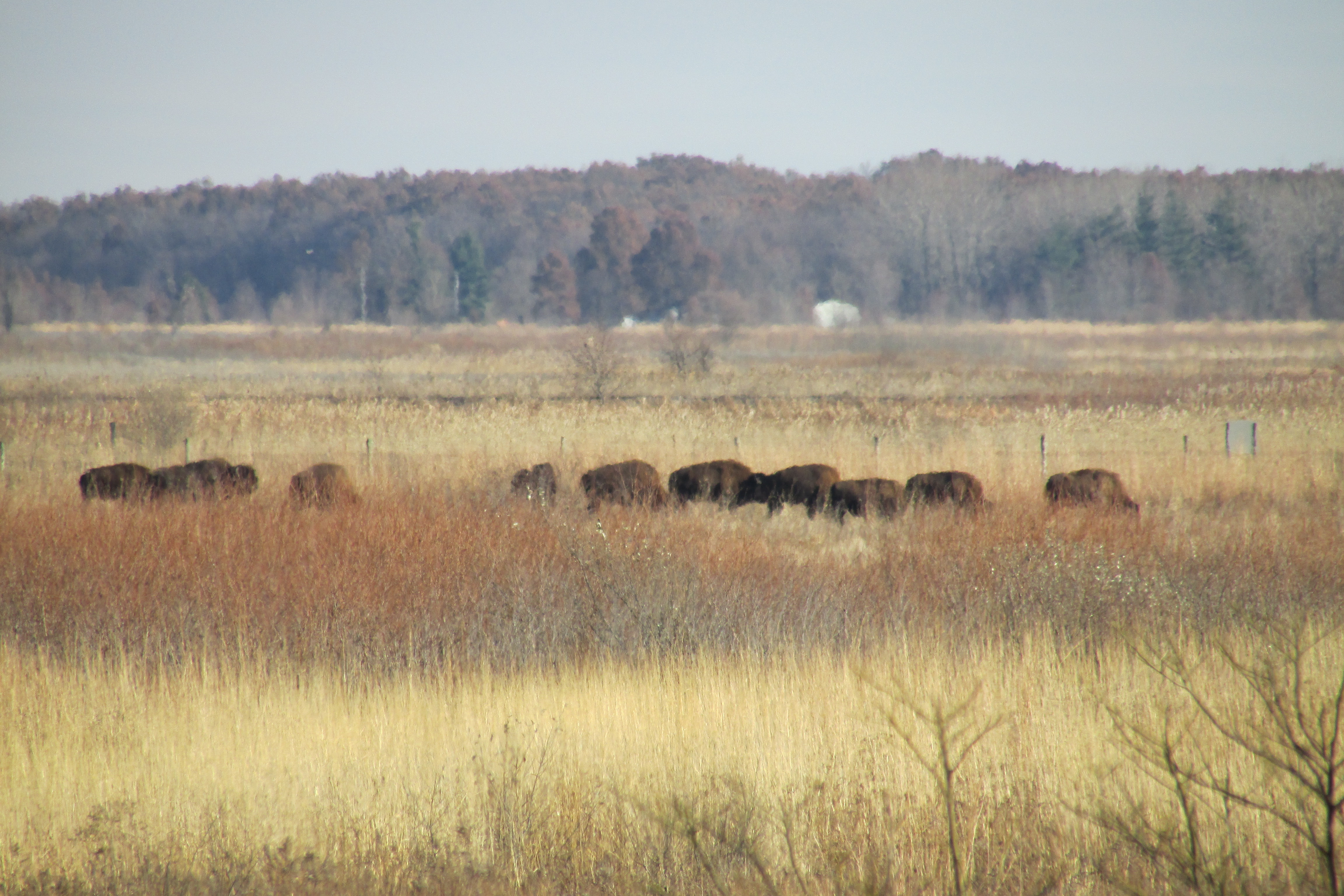
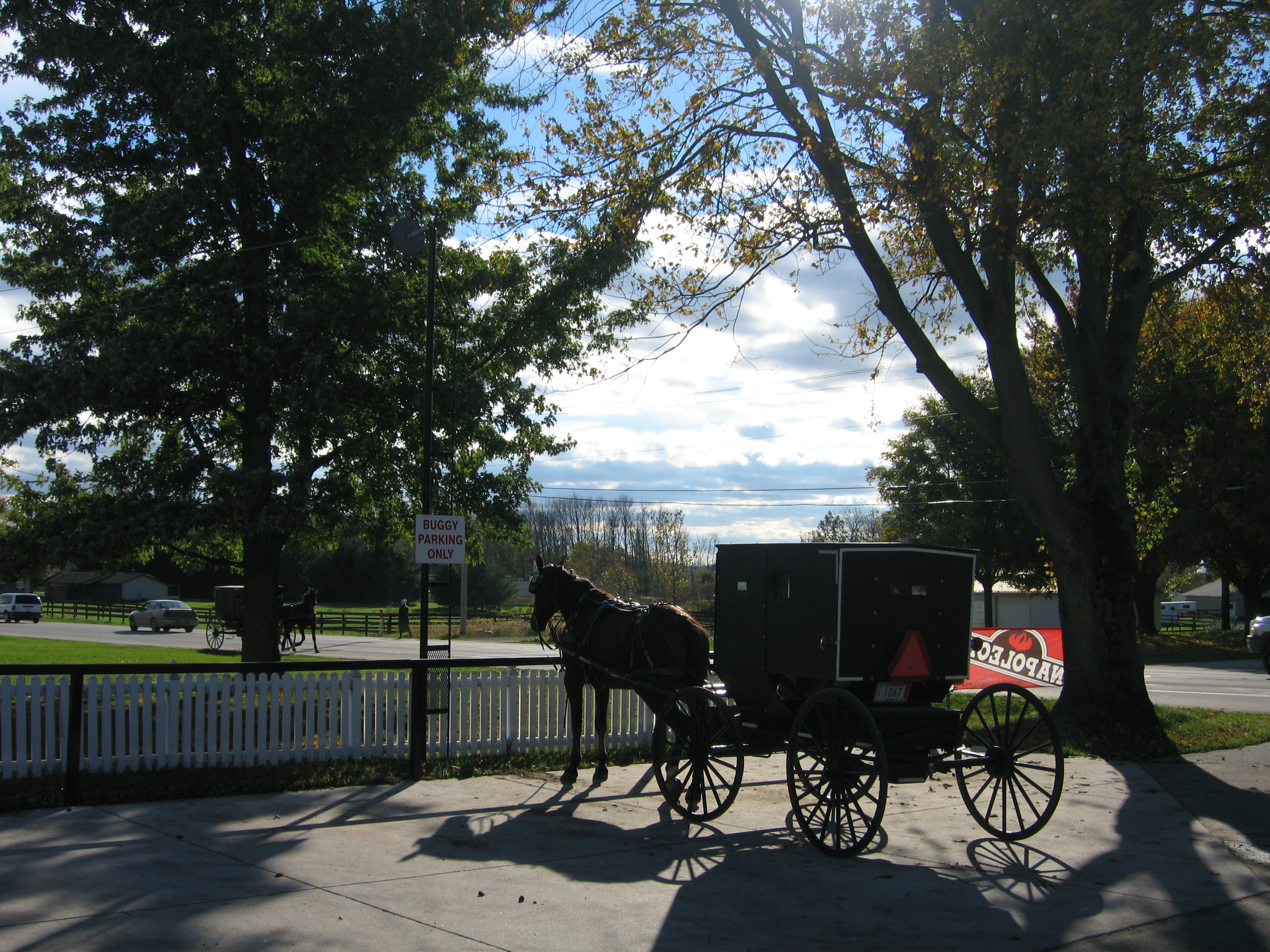
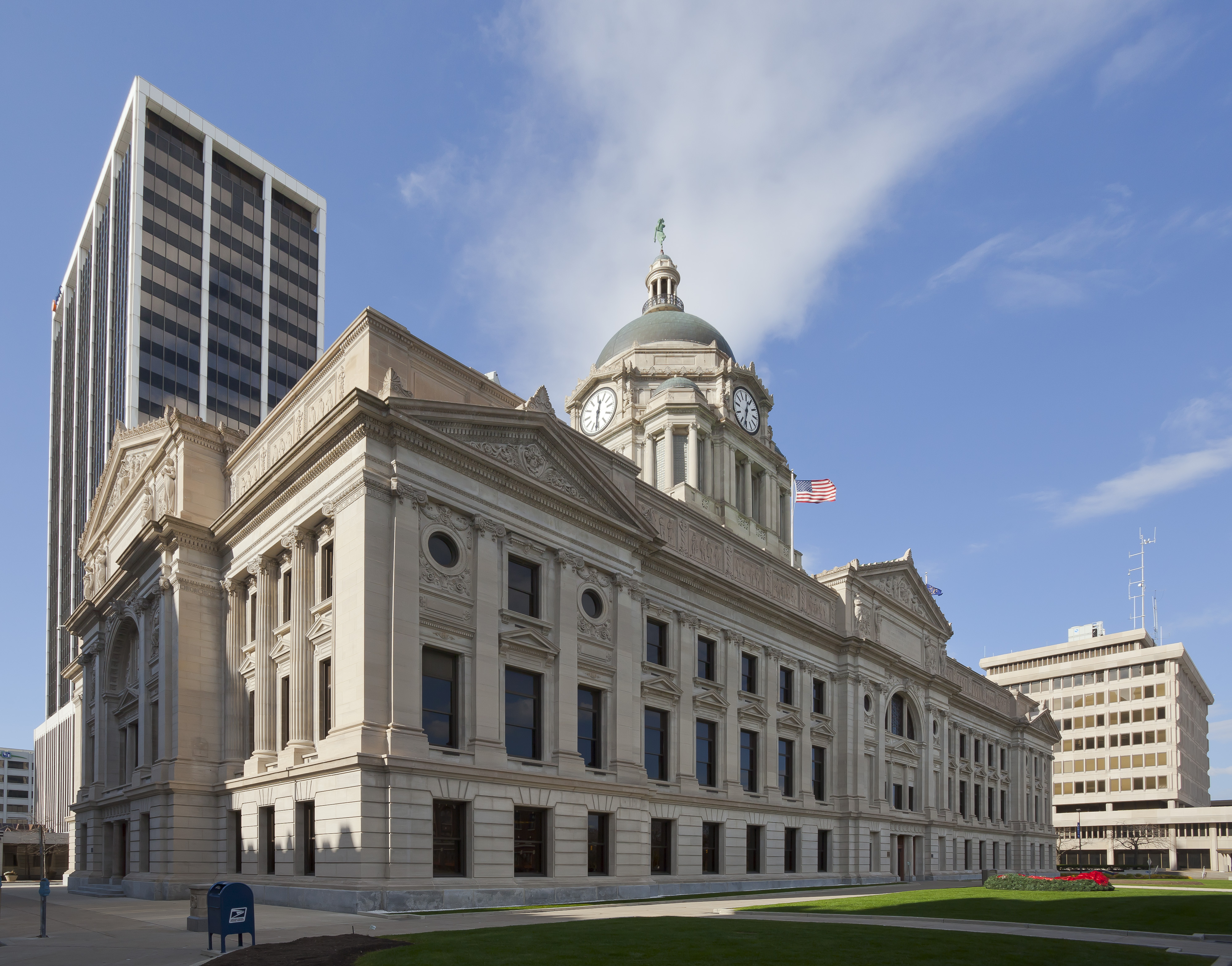
- Indiana Dunes National Park Meadow Lake Wind Farm Notre Dame Fighting Irish Port of Indiana—Burns Harbor and Lake Michigan Kankakee Sands Amish buggy in Shipshewana Allen County Courthouse

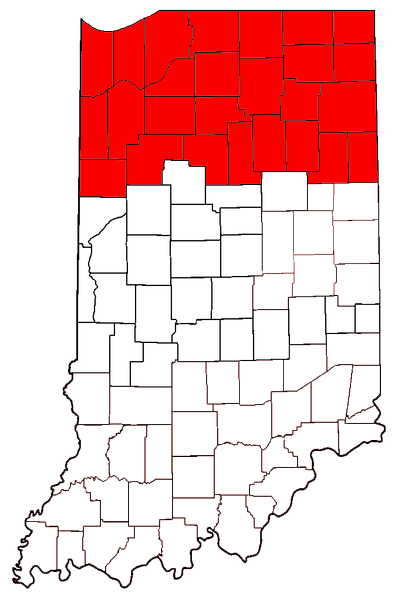
- Map of counties in Indiana. Those highlighted in red are part of Northern Indiana.
- Country: United States
- State: Indiana
- Largest city: Fort Wayne

Population (2020)
  - Total: 2,317,804

Northern Indiana is a geographic and cultural region that generally comprises the northern third of the U.S. state of Indiana and borders the states of Illinois to the west, Michigan to the north, and Ohio to the east. Spanning the state's northernmost 26 counties, its main population centers include Northwest Indiana (anchored by the cities of Hammond and Gary and part of the larger Chicago metropolitan area), Michiana (anchored by the cities of South Bend, Mishawaka, and Elkhart), and the Fort Wayne metropolitan area (anchored by the city of Fort Wayne).

Northern Indiana's physical geography was significantly shaped during Wisconsin glaciation, resulting in a till plain ranging from flat to gently rolling terrain, especially in the Wabash Valley. The region experiences a humid continental climate, supporting temperate deciduous forest, tallgrass prairie, and wetland ecosystems. In addition to Lake Michigan, more than 300 kettle lakes are located in the region, including the state's largest natural lake (Wawasee) and deepest natural lake (Tippecanoe). Following the Valparaiso Moraine, the Laurentian Divide meanders through the region, separating the watersheds of the Great Lakes Basin to the north from those of the Mississippi River drainage basin to the south.

Northern Indiana is situated within the larger Rust Belt and Corn Belt regions, influencing the area's geographic, economic, cultural, and political landscape. Home to about 2.3 million people, the region is defined by both its industrial cities and agricultural towns. Manufacturing remains a vital part of the region's economy, particularly in the production of recreational vehicles, medical devices, and steel. Protected areas include Indiana Dunes National Park and Indiana's most visited state park of the same name. Northern Indiana is home to about 25 public and private higher education institutions, including more than a dozen religiously affiliated colleges and universities. The region is split between the Eastern and Central time zones.

== Geography ==
Major waterways include the Grand Calumet River, the Kankakee River, the Maumee River (St. Marys and St. Joseph rivers), the St. Joseph River (Elkhart River), and the Wabash River (Eel, Little, and Tippecanoe rivers). Besides Lake Michigan, other notable lakes and reservoirs include Lake Freeman, Lake George, Lake James, Lake Manitou, Lake Maxinkuckee, Lake Shafer, Lake Tippecanoe, Lake Wawasee, Webster Lake, and Wolf Lake.

=== Sub-regions ===
==== Michiana ====
Michiana, a portmanteau of "Michigan" and "Indiana", is a loosely defined sub-region that spans southwestern Michigan and Northern Indiana's north-central counties. It is centered on the South Bend–Elkhart–Mishawaka Combined Statistical Area and generally corresponds with Area code 574. Counties typically considered part of the Michiana sub-region include:

- Elkhart
- Fulton
- Kosciusko
- Marshall
- St. Joseph

==== Northeast Indiana ====
Northeast Indiana comprises the northeastern portion of Northern Indiana, centered on the Fort Wayne–Huntington–Auburn Combined Statistical Area and generally corresponding with Area code 260. Counties typically considered part of the Northeast Indiana sub-region include:

- Adams
- Allen
- DeKalb
- Huntington
- LaGrange
- Noble
- Steuben
- Wabash
- Wells
- Whitley

==== Northwest Indiana ====
Northwest Indiana, colloquially known as "The Region", comprises the northwestern portion of Northern Indiana, centered on the southeastern extent of the Chicago metropolitan area and generally corresponding with Area code 219. Counties typically considered part of the Northwest Indiana sub-region include:

- Jasper
- Lake
- LaPorte
- Newton
- Porter
- Pulaski
- Starke

==== Other counties ====
Benton and White counties have economic ties to the Lafayette–West Lafayette metropolitan area, typically considered part of Central Indiana. Cass and Miami counties have economic ties to the Kokomo metropolitan area, also typically considered part of Central Indiana. Portions of these counties fall within Area code 765.

=== Time zones ===
Most of Northern Indiana (20 counties) observes Eastern Time. Six counties in the Northwest Indiana sub-region (Jasper, Lake, LaPorte, Newton, Porter, and Starke counties) observe Central Time.

== Largest municipalities ==
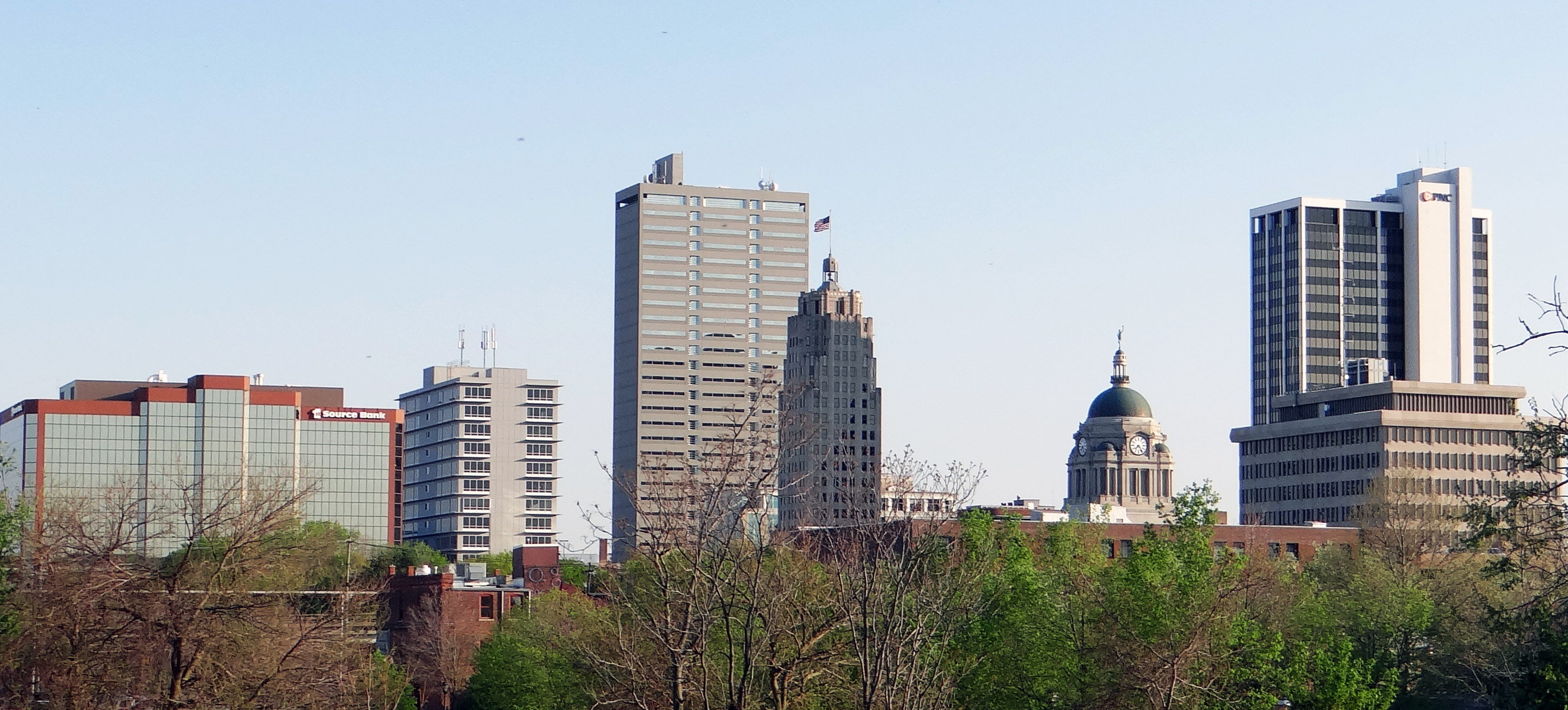
Fort Wayne is the largest city in Northern Indiana and second-largest in the state.

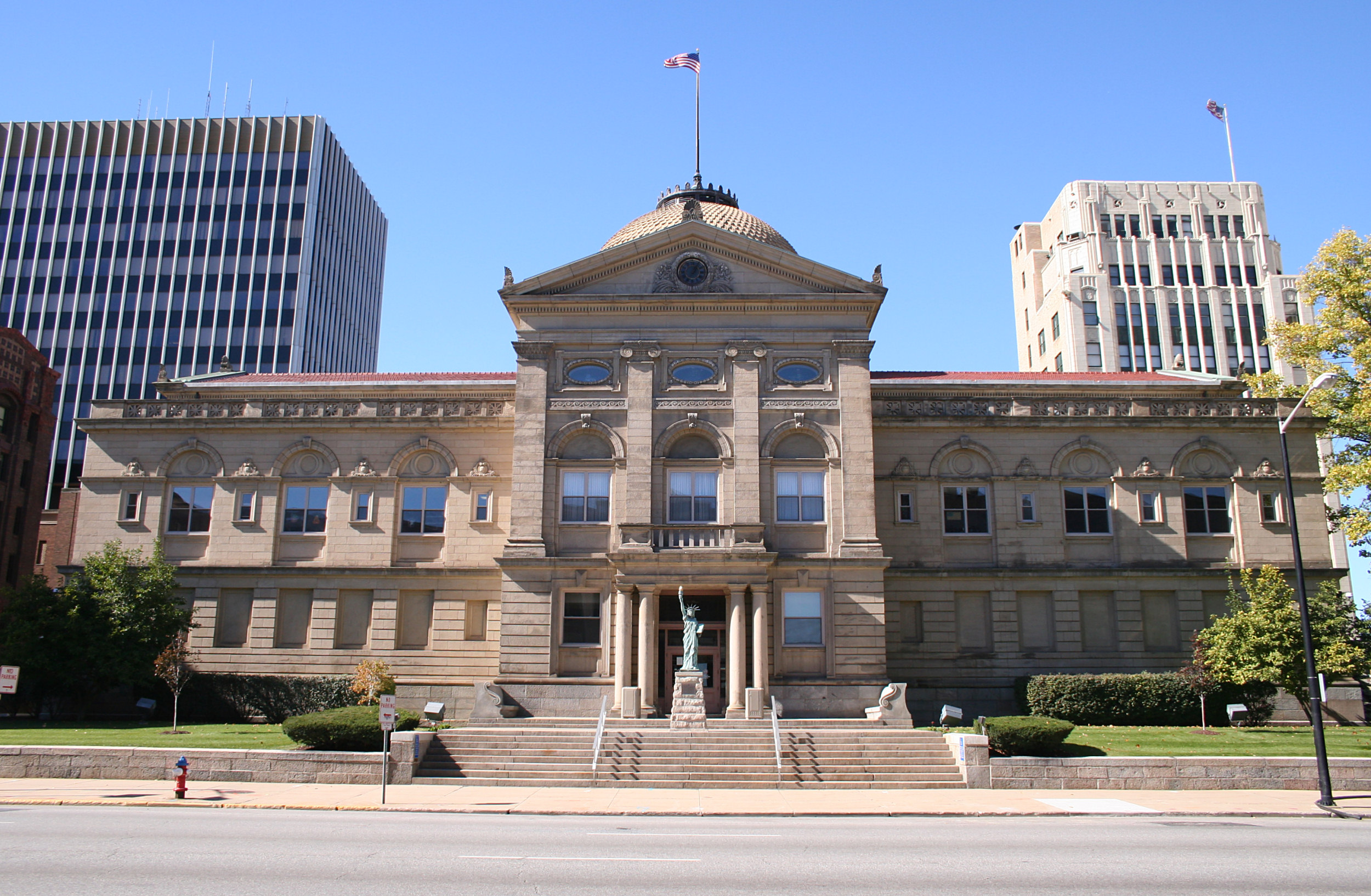
South Bend is the second-largest city in Northern Indiana and fourth-largest in the state.

The major cities of Northern Indiana are Fort Wayne (in the northeast), South Bend (in the north-central region), and Hammond and Gary (in the extreme northwest along Lake Michigan).

2020 rank	City	County	2020 Census	2010 Census	Change	Highest Population (Year)
1	Fort Wayne	Allen	263,852	253,691	+4.01%	263,852 (2020)
2	South Bend	St. Joseph	103,675	101,168	+2.48%	132,445 (1960)
3	Hammond	Lake	77,754	80,830	−3.81%	111,698 (1960)
4	Gary	Lake	68,982	80,294	−14.09%	178,320 (1960)
5	Elkhart	Elkhart	54,044	50,949	+6.07%	54,044 (2020)
6	Mishawaka	St. Joseph	51,201	48,252	+6.11%	51,201 (2020)
7	Portage	Porter	37,934	36,828	+3.00%	37,934 (2020)
8	Merrillville	Lake	36,603	35,246	+3.85%	36,603 (2020)
9	Goshen	Elkhart	34,849	31,719	+9.87%	34,849 (2020)
10	Valparaiso	Porter	34,154	31,730	+7.64%	34,154 (2020)

== Demographics ==
Historical population
Census	Pop.	Note	%±
1890	524,581		—
1900	597,433		13.9%
1910	687,867		15.1%
1920	809,770		17.7%
1930	1,015,942		25.5%
1940	1,085,251		6.8%
1950	1,297,939		19.6%
1960	1,621,357		24.9%
1970	1,802,562		11.2%
1980	1,891,741		4.9%
1990	1,901,209		0.5%
2000	2,062,933		8.5%
2010	2,147,765		4.1%
2020	2,317,804		7.9%
U.S. Decennial Census

Northern Indiana has experienced steady population growth over the past century (except at the 1990 U.S. census). Between 1980 and 1990, Lake County (which includes the city of Gary) saw a population decline of 47,371 residents, and it was this drop in population that hid the population rise which continued to occur in the majority of the region's other counties. The 2015 Census Estimate has shown that the rural counties (i.e., Wabash and Wells) are seeing a gradual population decline when compared to the gradual increase (or steady) population trend in the more urban counties (i.e., St. Joseph). The trend of rural counties losing population has been observed in various counties in other regions, most notably the Great Plains.

Roughly 10.7% of both Huntington and Wells County live in poverty, as compared to only 15.5% in Pulaski County. At the same time, Northern Indiana, as is the case for much of the Midwest, is predominately made up of people of European heritage. According to the 2010 Census, almost 98% of Whitley County is white, as compared to Lake County (Gary), which is only 64.4% white and 25.9% African American. Lastly, the average family size per household is relatively constant around 3.00 persons per household. In 2010, the average family size per household was 3.66 in LaGrange County, 3.23 in Elkhart County, 3.19 in Lake County, 3.16 in Noble County, 3.15 in Marshall County, and 3.12 in Allen County.

Northern Indiana is known for having the third-highest Amish population in the U.S., especially in Allen, Adams, Elkhart, and LaGrange counties.

== Dialect ==
The Inland North dialect of American English is mostly found in the Calumet region of Northern Indiana. The Northern Cities Vowel Shift is recognizable in Northwest Indiana and the Michiana area. However, the rest of Northern Indiana tends to exhibit North Midland dialect, with little recognizable influences. Because of the city's transitional location between the Inland North, North Midland, and Central Midland dialects, Fort Wayne has been difficult for linguists to define, with some labeling speech here "virtually accent neutral," attributed to historical settlement patterns.

== Economy ==
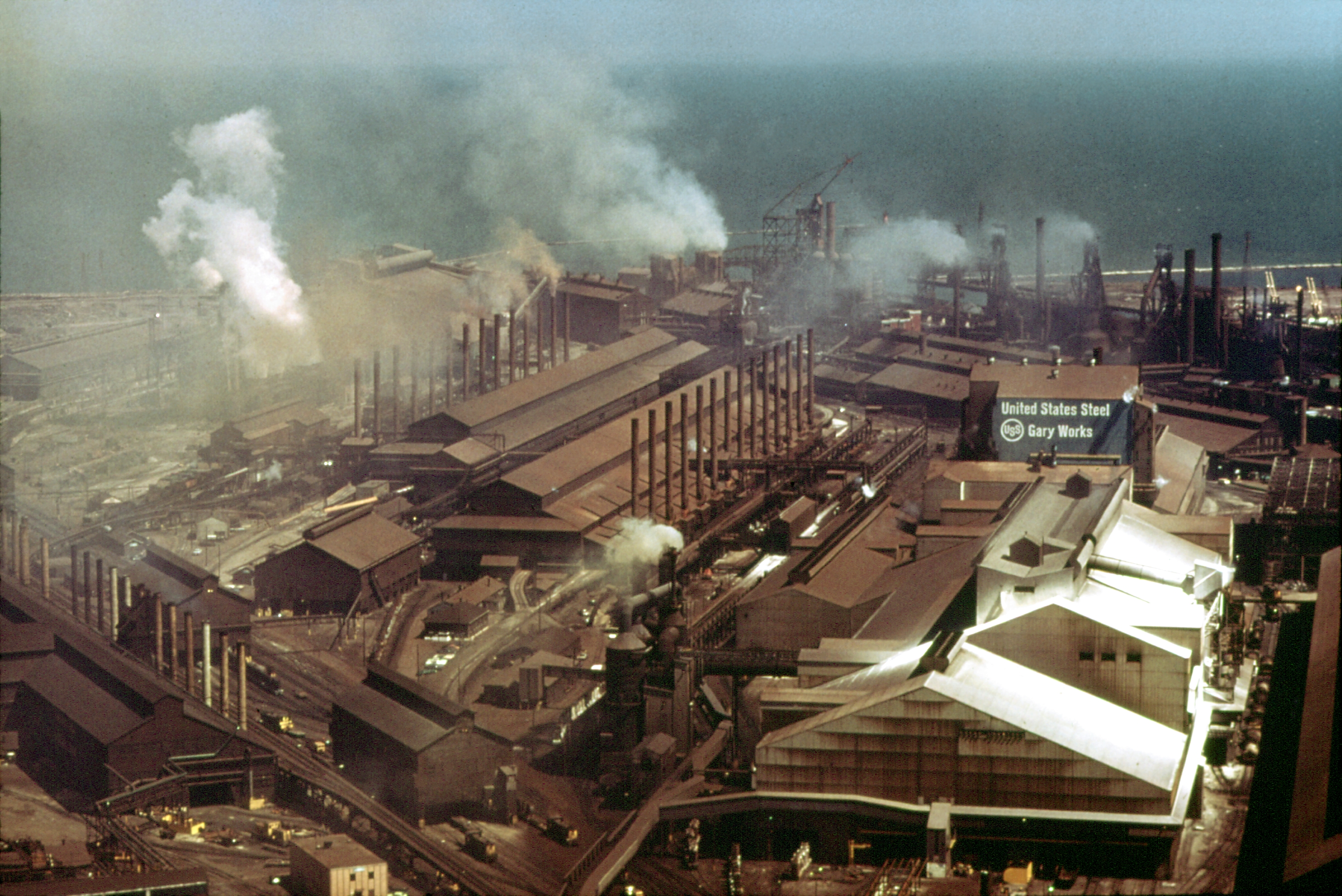
U.S. Steel Gary Works in 1973

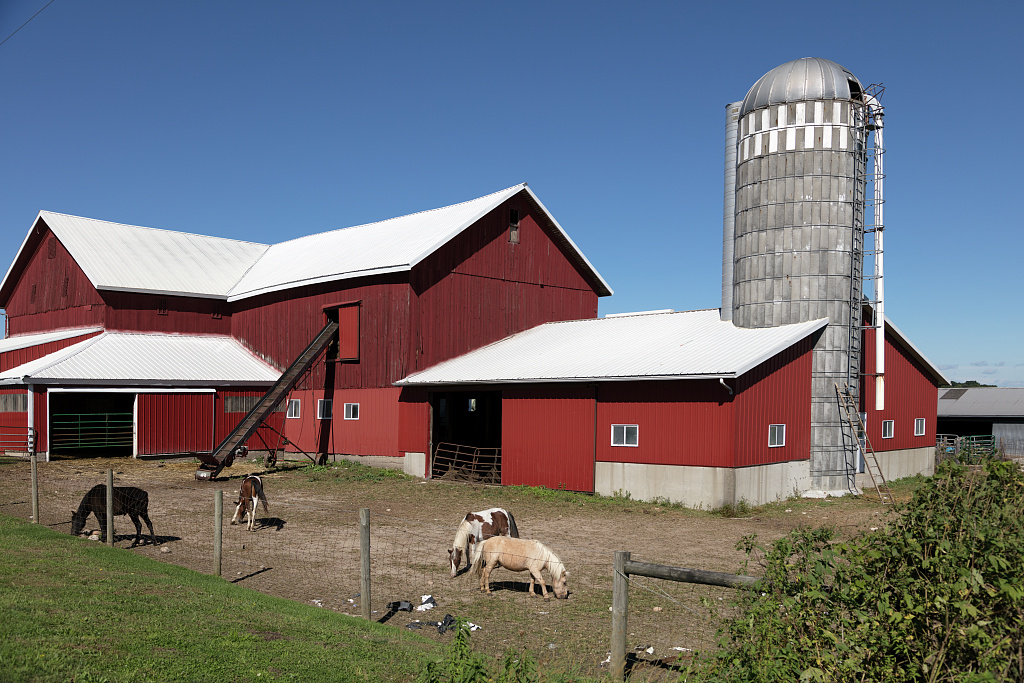
Farm near Middlebury in 2016

Northern Indiana's economy is primarily based on manufacturing and distribution and transportation. Outside the metropolitan areas, the region's agricultural sector is abundant provided its location within the fertile Corn Belt. Northwest Indiana is also a vital trade and shipping center for the state. The Port of Indiana–Burns Harbor handles more ocean-going cargo than any other Great Lakes port in the U.S.

Northern Indiana is also situated in the heart of the Rust Belt, an area of the U.S. that has suffered deindustrialization and some economic stagnation since the late 20th century.

=== Manufacturing ===
The Calumet region of Northwest Indiana is home to much heavy industry, notably steel mills. The Calumet region is the nation's second-largest steel-producing area. U.S. Steel's Gary Works (in Gary) was once the largest steel mill in the world and employed 30,000. Gary Works remains North America's largest integrated steel mill.

The north central area of Northern Indiana, centered on Warsaw, is home to several companies specializing in the development and production of orthopedic medical devices. In 2013, nearly one-third of the US$38 billion global orthopedic industry was concentrated in north central Indiana.

Elkhart and surrounding municipalities in the Michiana region are home to the largest concentration of recreational vehicle and mobile home manufacturers in the U.S., including Forest River, Heartland Recreational Vehicles, Jayco, and Monaco Coach, among several others. In 2013, some 83% of American RVs were produced in Elkhart County.

The automotive industry is another significant driver of the region's economy. General Motors' Fort Wayne Assembly near Roanoke produces the Chevrolet Silverado and GMC Sierra. South Bend-based AM General manufactures the civilian Hummer H1 and military Humvee at its Mishawaka assembly plant.

=== Gambling ===
Gambling is an important sector of the region's economy. Northern Indiana is home to three riverboat casinos (Ameristar in East Chicago, Blue Chip in Michigan City, and Horseshoe in Hammond), one land-based casino (Hard Rock in Gary), and one tribal casino (Four Winds in South Bend), owned by the Pokagon Band of Potawatomi Indians.

=== Energy ===
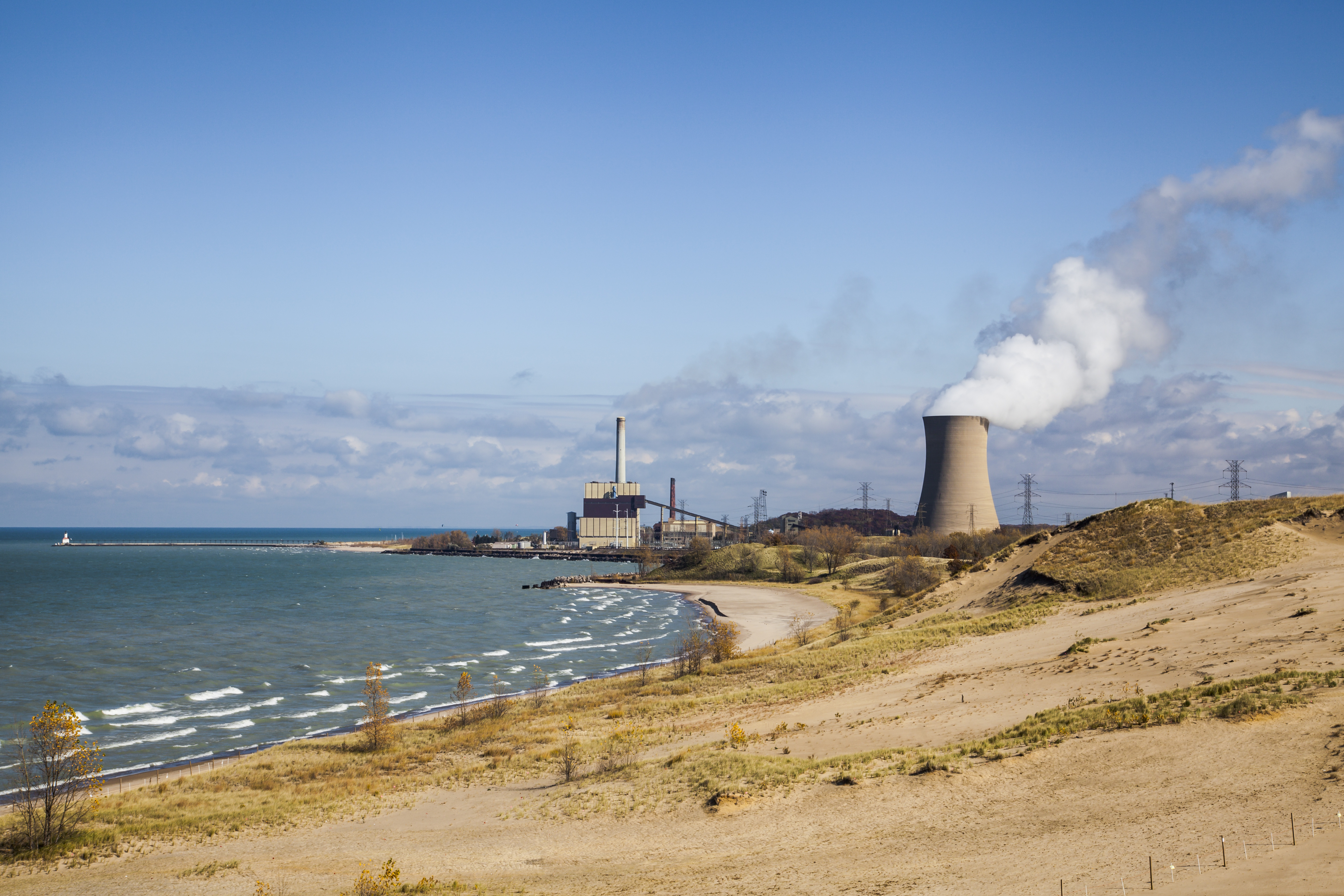
Michigan City Generating Station

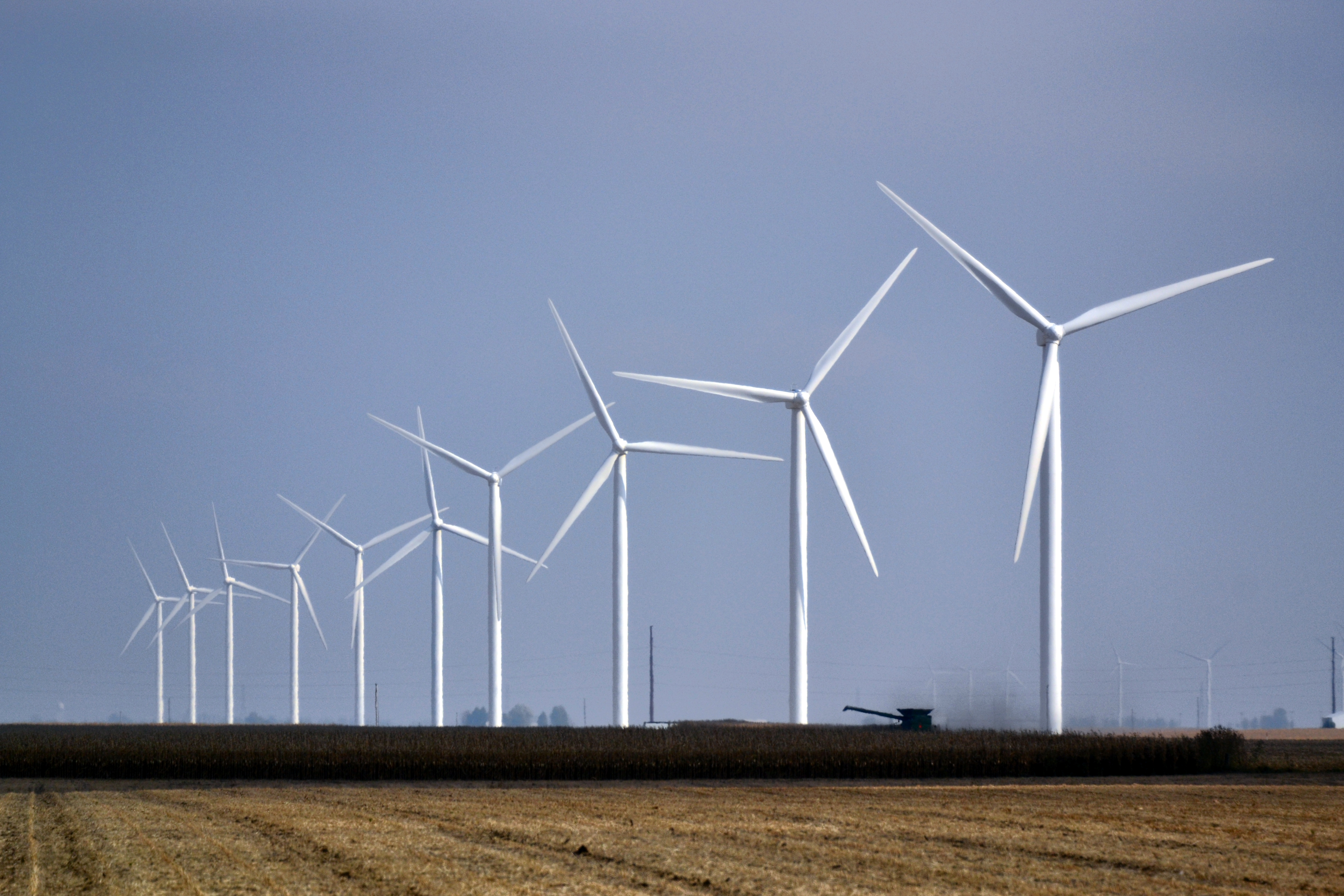
Meadow Lake Wind Farm in White County

Natural gas is primarily supplied by the Northern Indiana Public Service Company (NIPSCO), a subsidiary of Merrillville-based NiSource. Electric utilities serving the region include NIPSCO, Indiana Michigan Power (a subsidiary of American Electric Power), and Duke Energy Indiana (a subsidiary of Duke Energy). Four of Indiana's five hydroelectric power plants are located in Northern Indiana. Two are owned by Indiana Michigan Power (the Elkhart and Twin Branch dams on the St. Joseph River) and two are owned by NIPSCO (the Norway and Oakdale dams on the Tippecanoe River). The company also operates two coal-fired power stations in the region: Michigan City Generating Station and R. M. Schahfer in Wheatfield.

Northern Indiana's share of renewable energy generation, particularly solar and wind sources, has increased since the late 2000s. Wind farms are common in rural Benton and White counties, including Fowler Ridge, the largest wind farm in the American Midwest. Upon its completion, the Mammoth Solar project will be the largest in the U.S., covering 13,000 acres across rural Starke and Pulaski counties.

BP's Whiting Refinery in Whiting is the largest inland oil refinery in the U.S., processing 435,000 barrels (69,200 m^{3}) of crude oil daily.

Two regional transmission organizations serving the nation's electrical grid provide coverage to portions of Northern Indiana: Midcontinent Independent System Operator and PJM Interconnection.

=== Companies ===
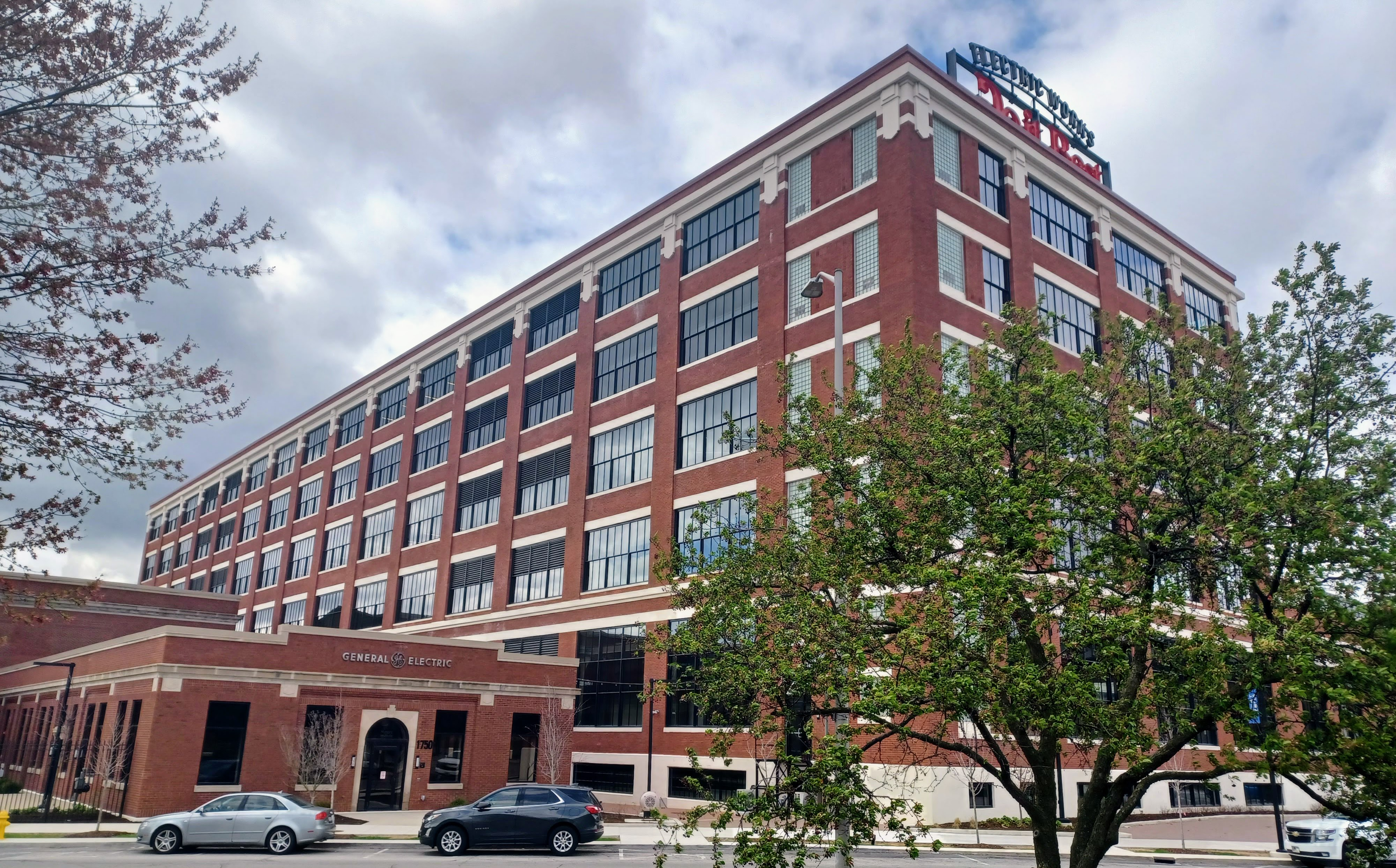
Do it Best corporate headquarters in Fort Wayne. In 2022, Do it Best was the largest privately held company in the state of Indiana, with US$5.5 billion in revenue.

Notable companies headquartered in Northern Indiana include:

- 1st Source – South Bend
- Albanese Candy – Merrillville
- American Licorice Company – La Porte
- Better World Books – Mishawaka
- Brotherhood Mutual – Fort Wayne
- DirectBuy – Crown Point
- Do it Best – Fort Wayne
- Family Express – Valparaiso
- Ford Meter Box Company – Wabash
- Franciscan Health – Mishawaka
- Franklin Electric – Fort Wayne
- Janus Motorcycles – Goshen
- KMC Controls – New Paris
- NiSource – Merrillville
- OrthoPediatrics – Warsaw
- Parkview Health – Fort Wayne
- Press Ganey – South Bend
- Rea Magnet Wire Company – Fort Wayne
- Schurz Communications – Mishawaka
- South Bend Chocolate Company – South Bend
- Steel Dynamics – Fort Wayne
- Sweetwater Sound – Fort Wayne
- Thor Industries – Elkhart
- Three Floyds Brewing – Munster
- Urschel Laboratories – Chesterton
- Utilimaster – Bristol
- Vera Bradley – Fort Wayne
- Weaver Popcorn Company – Van Buren
- White Lodging – Merrillville
- Zimmer Biomet – Warsaw

== Protected areas ==
=== National ===
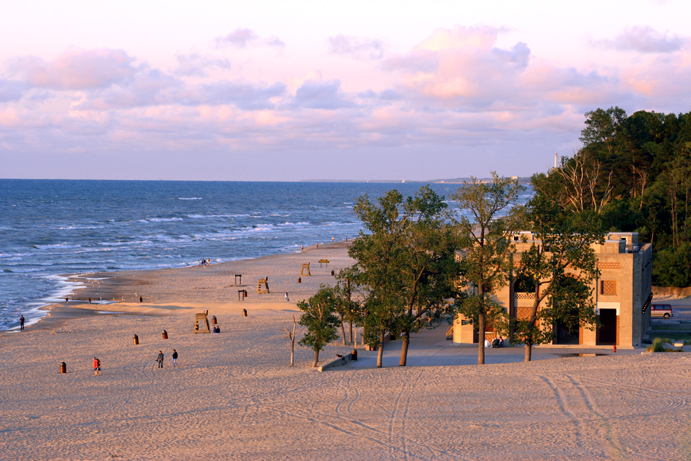
Indiana Dunes National Park is the most visited protected area in the region, receiving some 2.8 million visitors annually.

- Indiana Dunes National Park

=== State ===
- Chain O'Lakes State Park
- Conrad Savanna Nature Preserve
- Frances Slocum State Forest
- Hoosier Prairie State Nature Preserve
- Indiana Dunes State Park
- Jasper-Pulaski Fish and Wildlife Area
- J.E. Roush Fish and Wildlife Area
- Kankakee Fish and Wildlife Area
- Kingsbury Fish and Wildlife Area
- LaSalle Fish and Wildlife Area
- Ouabache State Park
- Pigeon River Fish and Wildlife Area
- Pokagon State Park
- Potato Creek State Park
- Salamonie River State Forest
- Tippecanoe River State Park
- Tri-County Fish and Wildlife Area
- Willow Slough Fish and Wildlife Area
- Winamac Fish and Wildlife Area

== Educational institutions ==
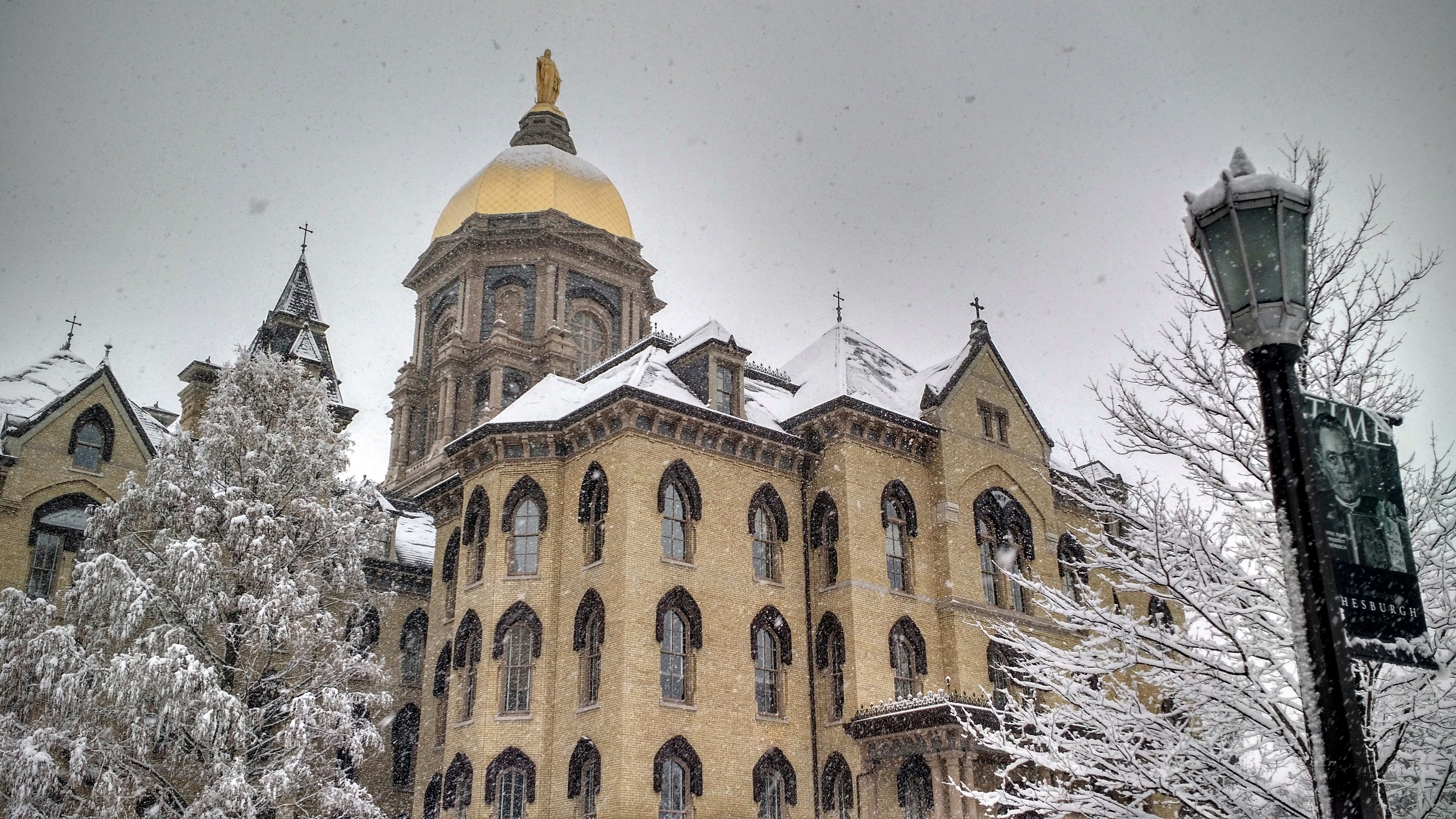
Main Building on the campus of the University of Notre Dame, a private Catholic research university in St. Joseph County known for its Fighting Irish athletic program.

About 25 accredited institutions of higher education are located throughout Northern Indiana, including more than a dozen private, liberal arts colleges and Christian seminaries, and multiple regional campuses of the public Indiana, Purdue, and Ivy Tech Community College systems. The "‡" symbol indicates universities with main campuses outside Northern Indiana.

=== Public ===
- Three Indiana University‡ campuses:
  - IU Fort Wayne
  - IU Northwest
  - IU South Bend
- Three Purdue University‡ campuses and one Purdue Polytechnic Institute‡ campus:
  - Purdue Fort Wayne
  - Purdue Northwest (Hammond and Westville)
  - Purdue Polytechnic Institute (South Bend)
- Ivy Tech Community College (12 sites)

=== Private ===
- Anabaptist Mennonite Biblical Seminary
- Bethel University
- Calumet College of Saint Joseph
- Concordia Theological Seminary
- Goshen College
- Grace College & Seminary
- Holy Cross College
- Huntington University
- Indiana Tech
- Indiana Wesleyan University‡ (Fort Wayne and Merrillville)
- Manchester University
- Marian University's Ancilla College‡
- Mid-America Reformed Seminary
- Saint Mary's College
- Trine University
- University of Notre Dame
- University of Saint Francis
- Valparaiso University

== Transportation ==
Two of Indiana's six state-designated scenic byways—the Historic Michigan Road Byway and the Lincoln Highway Scenic Byway—traverse portions of Northern Indiana.

=== Roads ===
Interstate Highways

- I-65
- I-69
- I-80
- I-90 (Indiana Toll Road)
- I-94
- I-469

US Highways

- US 6
- US 12
- US 20
- US 24
- US 27
- US 30
- US 31
- US 33
- US 35
- US 41
- US 52
- US 131
- US 224
- US 231
- US 421

State Roads

- SR 1
- SR 3
- SR 4
- SR 5
- SR 8
- SR 9
- SR 10
- SR 13
- SR 14
- SR 15
- SR 16
- SR 17
- SR 18
- SR 19
- SR 23
- SR 25
- SR 29
- SR 37
- SR 39
- SR 43
- SR 49
- SR 51
- SR 53
- SR 55
- SR 71
- SR 101
- SR 104
- SR 105
- SR 106
- SR 109
- SR 110
- SR 114
- SR 115
- SR 116
- SR 117
- SR 119
- SR 120
- SR 124
- SR 127
- SR 130
- SR 143
- SR 149
- SR 152
- SR 201
- SR 205
- SR 212
- SR 218
- SR 249
- SR 301
- SR 312
- SR 327
- SR 329
- SR 331
- SR 352
- SR 427
- SR 520
- SR 524
- SR 727
- SR 827
- SR 912
- SR 930
- SR 931
- SR 933

=== Mass transit ===
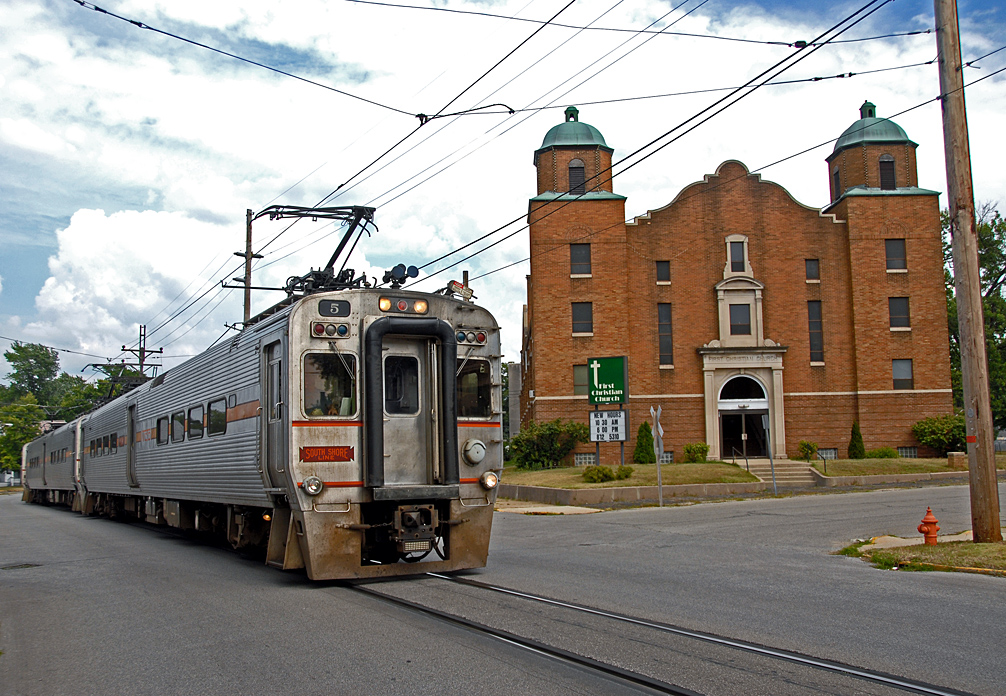
NICTD South Shore Line commuter train in Michigan City

=== Airports ===
Most of Northern Indiana's 26 public aviation facilities are categorized as general aviation airports; however, the region is also home to two primary airports and one relief airport. In addition, two United States Air Force installations are based in the region.

Primary

- Fort Wayne International
- South Bend International

Relief

- Griffith-Merrillville

General aviation

- Arens Field
- DeKalb County
- Elkhart Municipal
- Fulton County
- Gary/Chicago International
- Goshen Municipal
- Grissom Aeroplex
- Huntington Municipal
- Jasper County
- Kendallville Municipal
- Kentland Municipal
- La Porte Municipal
- Logansport/Cass County
- Michigan City Municipal
- Peru Municipal
- Plymouth Municipal
- Porter County Regional
- Smith Field
- Starke County
- Tri-State Steuben County
- Wabash Municipal
- Warsaw Municipal
- White County

Military

- Fort Wayne Air National Guard Base
- Grissom Air Reserve Base

=== Maritime ===
- Northern Indiana Maritime District
  - Buffington Harbor
  - Indiana Harbor and Ship Canal
  - Port of Indiana—Burns Harbor

== Notable people ==
- George Ade
- Johnny Appleseed
- Julia Barr
- Anne Baxter
- DaMarcus Beasley
- Beulah Bondi
- Frank Borman
- Otis Bowen
- Sylvanus Bowser
- Pete Buttigieg
- Earl Butz
- James Clapper
- Schuyler Colfax
- Dean Corll
- Ward Cunningham
- Adam Driver
- Mike Emrick
- Philo Farnsworth
- Ford Frick
- Janie Fricke
- Terry Funk
- Jim Gaffigan
- Crystal Gayle
- Belle Gunness
- Tom Harmon
- Richard G. Hatcher
- Heather Headley
- Tony Hinkle
- Jackson family
- Alex Karras
- Greg Kinnear
- Little Turtle
- Carole Lombard
- Shelley Long
- Karl Malden
- Thomas R. Marshall
- Kym Mazelle
- Hugh McCulloch
- Bob McDonald
- Sydney Pollack
- Gregg Popovich
- Cole Porter
- Dan Quayle
- Sam Rice
- Jean Baptiste Richardville
- Ruth Riley
- John Roberts
- Knute Rockne
- Paul Samuelson
- Chris Schenkel
- Germany Schulz
- George Seaton
- Connie Smith
- Hank Stram
- Gene Stratton-Porter
- George Taliaferro
- Steve Tesich
- Harold Urey
- Deniece Williams
- Rod Woodson

== See also ==
- Geography of Indiana
- Great Lakes Megalopolis
- Southern Indiana
- Wabash Valley
