= Indiana State Road 201 =

State highway in Indiana, United States

State Road 201
- SR 201 highlighted in red

Route information
- Maintained by INDOT
- Length: 1.237 mi (1.991 km)

Major junctions
- South end: Ouabache State Park
- North end: SR 124 at Bluffton

Location
- Country: United States
- State: Indiana
- Counties: Wells

Highway system
- Indiana State Highway System; Interstate; US; State; Scenic
← SR 168	→ SR 203

State Road 201 in the U.S. state of Indiana exists in Wells County. It connects Ouabache State Park with State Road 124 to the north, a distance of 1.2 miles (1.9 km). It meets State Road 124 just east of Bluffton.

== Route description ==
SR 201 begins at the entrance to Ouabache State Park. It heads northwest until it reaches a four-way intersection with two local roads. The road heads north from here until it terminates at a 3-way intersection with SR 124. SR 201 is an undivided two-lane road for its entire length.

== Major intersections ==
The entire route is in Harrison Township, Wells County.

mi	km	Destinations	Notes
0.000	0.000	Ouabache State Park	Southern terminus of SR 201
1.237	1.991	SR 124	Northern terminus of SR 201
1.000 mi = 1.609 km; 1.000 km = 0.621 mi

== See also ==
- Indiana State Road 1
- Indiana State Road 101
- Indiana State Road 301
