= Indiana State Road 124 =

Highway in Indiana

State Road 124
- SR 124 highlighted in red

Route information
- Maintained by INDOT
- Length: 69.630 mi (112.059 km)
- Existed: 1932–present

Major junctions
- West end: SR 19 at West Peru
- US 27 at Monroe
- East end: SR 81 at Willshire, OH

Location
- Country: United States
- State: Indiana
- Counties: Adams, Huntington, Miami, Wabash, Wells

Highway system
- Indiana State Highway System; Interstate; US; State; Scenic
← SR 121	→ SR 127

State Road 124 (SR 124) is an east–west state road in the U.S. state of Indiana. The highway runs from SR 19 in Peru east through Bluffton and Monroe to end at Ohio State Route 81 near Willshire, Ohio. SR 124 runs through mostly agricultural land and near a few state parks through Northern Indiana.

SR 124 was first designated as a state road in 1932 along a segment of its current route. It was extended west to the Miami–Wabash county line by the late 1930s and to Peru by the early 1950s. The entire route was paved in the early 1960s to the mid-1960s. A reroute in the 2000s bypassed the west side of Bluffton.

== Route description ==
SR 124 starts in Peru at the corner of Broadway (SR 19) and Riverside Drive. The state road heads east concurrent with Riverside Drive and parallel to the Wabash River. The road leaves Peru and enters rural Miami County, passing through farmland. SR 124 parallels the Mississinewa River, before crossing over it. After crossing over the river SR 124 passes north of the Mississinewa Lake Dam, before entering Wabash County. In Wabash County the highway passes through mostly agricultural areas with some woodlands. SR 124 has intersection with SR 13 and SR 15 in rural Wabash County, south of the city of Wabash. East of SR 15, SR 124 enters Huntington County.

In rural Huntington County SR 124 passes through an intersection with SR 105 and SR 9. After SR 9, SR 124 passes through Mt. Etna and a small section of the Salamonie River State Forest. SR 124 passes over the Salamonie River, before an intersection with Huntington County Road 300 West, formerly known as SR 221, south of Lancaster. The highway continues east passes farmland and through an intersection with SR 5. East of SR 5, SR 124 passes over Interstate 69 (I-69), but SR 124 does not have an interchange. After I-69, SR 124 has an intersection with SR 3, before leaving Huntington County and entering Wells County.

In Wells County SR 124 has an intersection with Wells County Road 300 West, formerly known as SR 303. West of Bluffton SR 124 turns north and then back east, crossing over the Wabash River, before having an intersection with SR 116. SR 124 turns east onto SR 116 and the roadway heads east towards SR 1. The highway has an at-grade crossing with a Norfolk Southern Railroad track, before entering the city of Bluffton. At SR 1 both SR 116 and 124 turn south concurrent with SR 1 (Main Street), passing through Bluffton as a four-lane highway. The highway passes commercial properties and has an at-grade crossing with a Wabash Central Railroad track. SR 124 turns east and leaves Bluffton. East of Bluffton SR 124 passes through farmland and has an intersection with SR 201, before passing north of Ouabache State Park. The road has an intersection with SR 301 in rural Wells County, before crossing into Adams County.

SR 124 has an intersection with U.S. Route 27 (US 27), west of Monroe. The road enters Monroe concurrent with Washington Street, passing south of Adams Central Community Schools and through a mostly residential area. The road leaves Monroe and reenters rural Adams County. The highway has an intersection with SR 101, before crossing over the St. Marys River. After crossing the river the SR 124 designation ends at the Ohio state line. The roadway continues east as Ohio State Route 81 and passes through the village of Willshire, Ohio.

== History ==
The Indiana State Highway Commission designated SR 124 as a state road in early 1932, between SR 5 and the Wells–Adams county line. SR 124 in Adams County became a state road in late 1932. In 1934 the route between Peru and SR 5 was authorized to become a state road. Between late 1938 and early 1939 the route between the Miami–Wabash county line and SR 5 officially becomes a state road. SR 124 in Miami County was added to the state road system in late 1950 or early 1951. Paving on SR 124, in Miami and Huntington county and between SR 1 and the Wells–Adams county line, was completed in late 1962 or early 1963. The rest of the route was paved between late 1965 and early 1966. A bypass around the west side Bluffton was completed in late 2003 or early 2004.

== Major intersections ==
County	Location	mi	km	Destinations	Notes
Miami	Peru	0.000	0.000	SR 19	Western terminus of SR 124
Wabash	Noble Township	13.214	21.266	SR 13	
Wabash	Noble Township	15.018	24.169	SR 15 – Marion, Wabash, La Fontaine	
Huntington	Polk Township	24.105	38.793	SR 105 – Marion, Andrews	
Huntington	Mount Etna	26.608	42.821	SR 9 – Marion, Huntington	
Huntington	Rock Creek Township	33.532	53.965	SR 5 – Warren, Huntington	
Huntington	Rock Creek Township	37.266	59.974	SR 3 – Fort Wayne, Hartford City	
Wells	Bluffton	48.498	78.050	SR 116 west	Western end of SR 116 concurrency
Wells	Bluffton	49.270	79.292	SR 1 north	Northern end of SR 1 concurrency
Wells	Bluffton	50.269	80.900	SR 1 south / SR 116 east	Southern end of SR 1 concurrency; eastern end of SR 116 concurrency
Wells	Bluffton	52.106	83.856	SR 201 south – Ouabache State Park	Northern terminus of SR 201
Wells	Lancaster Township	54.528	87.754	SR 301 – Craigville	
Adams	Monroe	61.667	99.243	US 27 – Decatur, Berne	
Adams	St. Marys Township	67.584	108.766	SR 101 north – Pleasant Mills	Southern terminus of SR 101
Adams	St. Marys Township	69.630	112.059	SR 81 east	Eastern terminus of SR 124
1.000 mi = 1.609 km; 1.000 km = 0.621 mi: Concurrency terminus
