= List of Indiana state historical markers in Wells County =

Location of Wells County in Indiana

This is a list of the Indiana state historical markers in Wells County.

This is intended to be a detailed table of the official state historical marker placed in Wells County, Indiana, United States by the Indiana Historical Bureau. The location of the historical marker and its latitude and longitude coordinates are included below when available, along with its name, year of placement, and topics as recorded by the Historical Bureau. There are 2 historical markers located in Wells County.

== Historical markers ==
Marker title	Image	Year placed	Location	Topics
Charles C. Deam		2001	Park at the junctions of Wayne and Market and of River Road and Washington near the Wabash River in Bluffton; 40°44′20″N 85°9′53″W	Science, Medicine, and Inventions, Nature and Natural Disasters
Kingsland Interurban Wreck		2019	North side of US 224 and Market St., Kingsland; 40°49′48″N 85°10′35″W	Transportation

== See also ==
- List of Indiana state historical markers
- National Register of Historic Places listings in Wells County, Indiana
