= Indiana State Road 301 =

State highway in Indiana, United States

State Road 301
- SR 301 highlighted in red

Route information
- Maintained by INDOT
- Length: 3.529 mi (5.679 km)

Major junctions
- South end: SR 116 at Vera Cruz
- North end: SR 124 east of Bluffton

Location
- Country: United States
- State: Indiana

Highway system
- Indiana State Highway System; Interstate; US; State; Scenic
← SR 269	→ SR 312

State Road 301 in the U.S. state of Indiana is a short north–south route in Wells County in the northeastern part of the state.

== Route description ==
SR 301 begins at SR 116 south of the town of Vera Cruz and travel northeast crossing the Wabash River, before entering Vera Curz. In the town SR 301 is concurrent with Center Street before turning northwest onto Wabash Street and leaving town. SR 301 logs its lowest average annual daily traffic (AADT) counts. The 2016 AADT figures show that 386 vehicles use the highway per day between Center Street and SR 124. Northwest of Vera Cruz the road passes through farmland before turning due north paralleling the east side of Ouabache State Park. The highway ends an intersection with SR 124 south of Craigville.

== History ==
Prior to 2020, SR 301 continued north past SR 124 to U.S. Route 224 about a mile east of Tocsin. According to INDOT, this segment just north of SR 124 logged the highway's highwast AADT, only 963 vehicles per day, in 2016. In Craigville SR 301 crosses over the Wabash Central Railroad track.

== Major intersections ==
The entire route is in Wells County.

Location	mi	km	Destinations	Notes
Harrison Township	0.000	0.000	SR 116	Southern terminus of SR 301
Lancaster Township	3.529	5.679	SR 124	Northern terminus of SR 301
1.000 mi = 1.609 km; 1.000 km = 0.621 mi
