= Urschel =

Urschel is a German surname. Notable people with the surname include:

- Charles F. Urschel (1890–1970), American oilman
- John Urschel (born 1991), Canadian-born American football player and mathematician

== See also ==
- Urschel Laboratories
