= Elenhank =

Elenhank (or Elenhank Designers, Inc.) was a textile design firm. It was started by artist Eleanor Kluck and her husband architect Henry Kluck. They blended their names together to create the company name. They started creating textiles in 1946. Eleanor Kluck designed and cut the lino-cuts that were used. She started working with Henry Kluck in 1948. In the mid-1950s they started to use screen-printing methods. In the 1970s they started designing textiles influenced by Northern Indiana landscapes.

Works by Elenhank are held in the collection of the Cooper-Hewitt, National Design Museum, Art Institute of Chicago, and the Metropolitan Museum of Art.

== History ==
Elenhank Designers, Inc. originated in the mid-1940s as an informal collaboration between artist Eleanor McMaster Kluck and architect Henry C. Kluck II. Shortly after their marriage in 1946, the couple began experimenting with hand-printed textiles while living in a rented apartment, producing linoleum-block printed fabrics initially intended for personal use. An early commission from an architect acquaintance led them to print yardage by hand, marking the beginning of their professional practice.

The firm was formally established in Chicago in 1948 under the name Elenhank Designers, a portmanteau derived from the founders’ first names. During its early years, production focused on hand-block printing, with Eleanor Kluck responsible for design and Henry Kluck contributing architectural and technical expertise. In the mid-1950s, Elenhank transitioned from block printing to screen-printing, a shift that allowed for greater scale, color variation, and consistency while retaining a hand-crafted aesthetic.

In 1981, after more than three decades of operation, Elenhank Designers, Inc. was sold to new ownership. Limited production of selected designs continued under this ownership until the mid-1980s. Eleanor and Henry Kluck retired from active design work in 1984, marking the end of Elenhank as a practicing firm.
