= John A. Grove House =

Historic house in Indiana, United States

- Formerly listed on the U.S. National Register of Historic Places
- Location within Indiana Location within the United States
- Location: 521 W. Market St., Bluffton, Indiana
- Coordinates: 40°44′24″N 85°10′38″W
- Area: less than one acre
- Built: 1891
- Architectural style: Queen Anne
- NRHP reference No.: 83000045

Significant dates
- Added to NRHP: December 22, 1983
- Removed from NRHP: July 14, 2011

John A. Grove House, also known as the Henry H. Hunsicker Residence, was a historic home located at Bluffton, Indiana. It was built in 1891, and was a two-story, Queen Anne style frame dwelling. It featured a conical-roofed turret, steeply pitched hipped roof, and arcaded front porch. The house was destroyed by fire on January 30, 2008.

It was listed on the National Register of Historic Places in 1983 and delisted in 2011.
