= Stewart-Studebaker House =

Historic house in Indiana, United States

- U.S. National Register of Historic Places
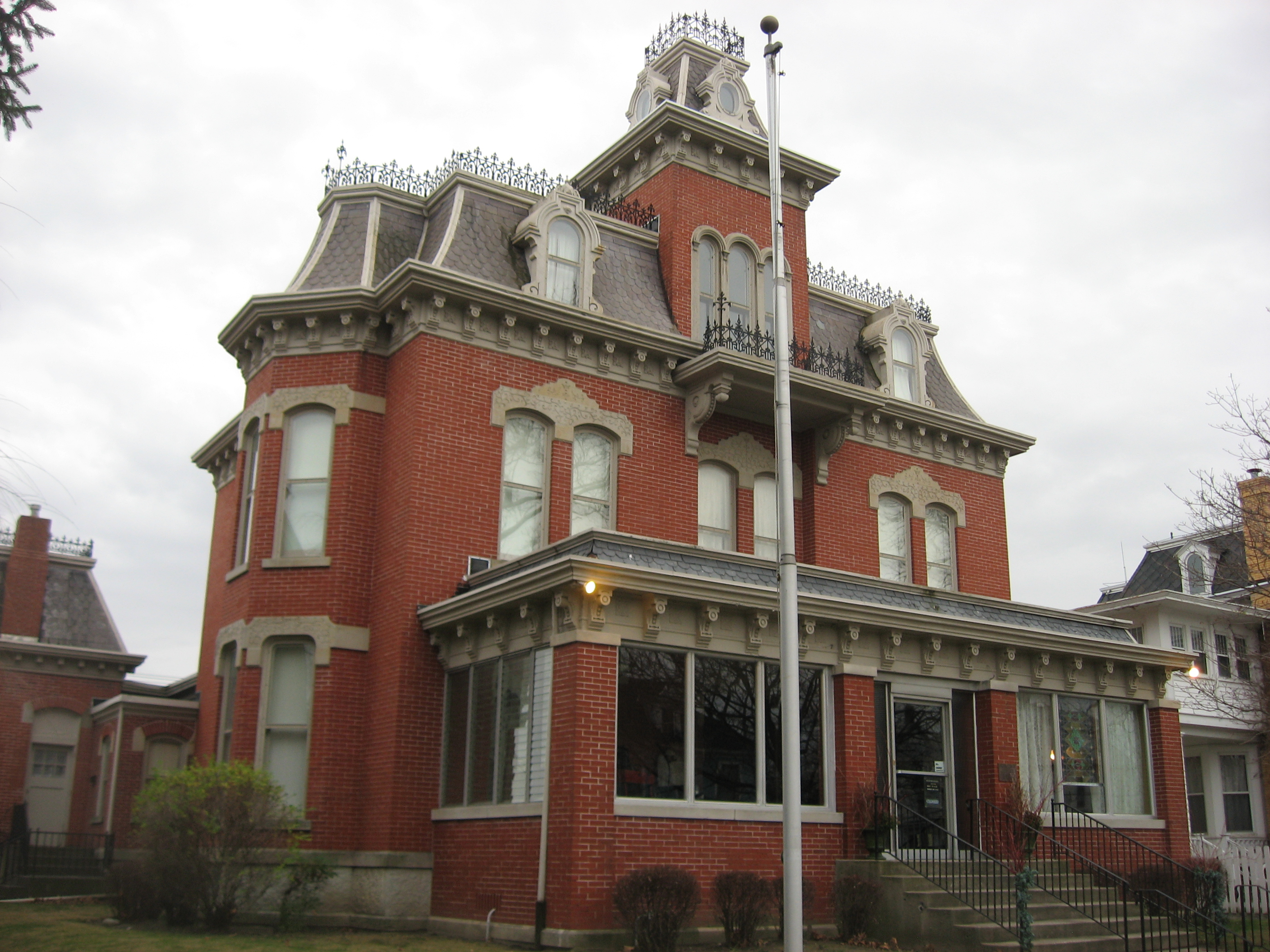
- Stewart-Studebaker House, November 2011

- Location within Indiana Location within the United States
- Location: 420 W. Market St., Bluffton, Indiana
- Coordinates: 40°44′22″N 85°10′33″W
- Area: less than one acre
- Built: 1882
- Architectural style: Second Empire
- NRHP reference No.: 79000027
- Added to NRHP: May 14, 1979

Stewart-Studebaker House, also known as the John Studebaker Residence, is a historic home located at Bluffton, Indiana. It was built in 1882, and is a two-story, Second Empire style red brick dwelling topped by a slate mansard roof. It features a Mansarded tower above the main entrance.

It was listed on the National Register of Historic Places in 1979.
