= Villa North Historic District =

Historic district in Indiana, United States

- U.S. National Register of Historic Places
- U.S. Historic district
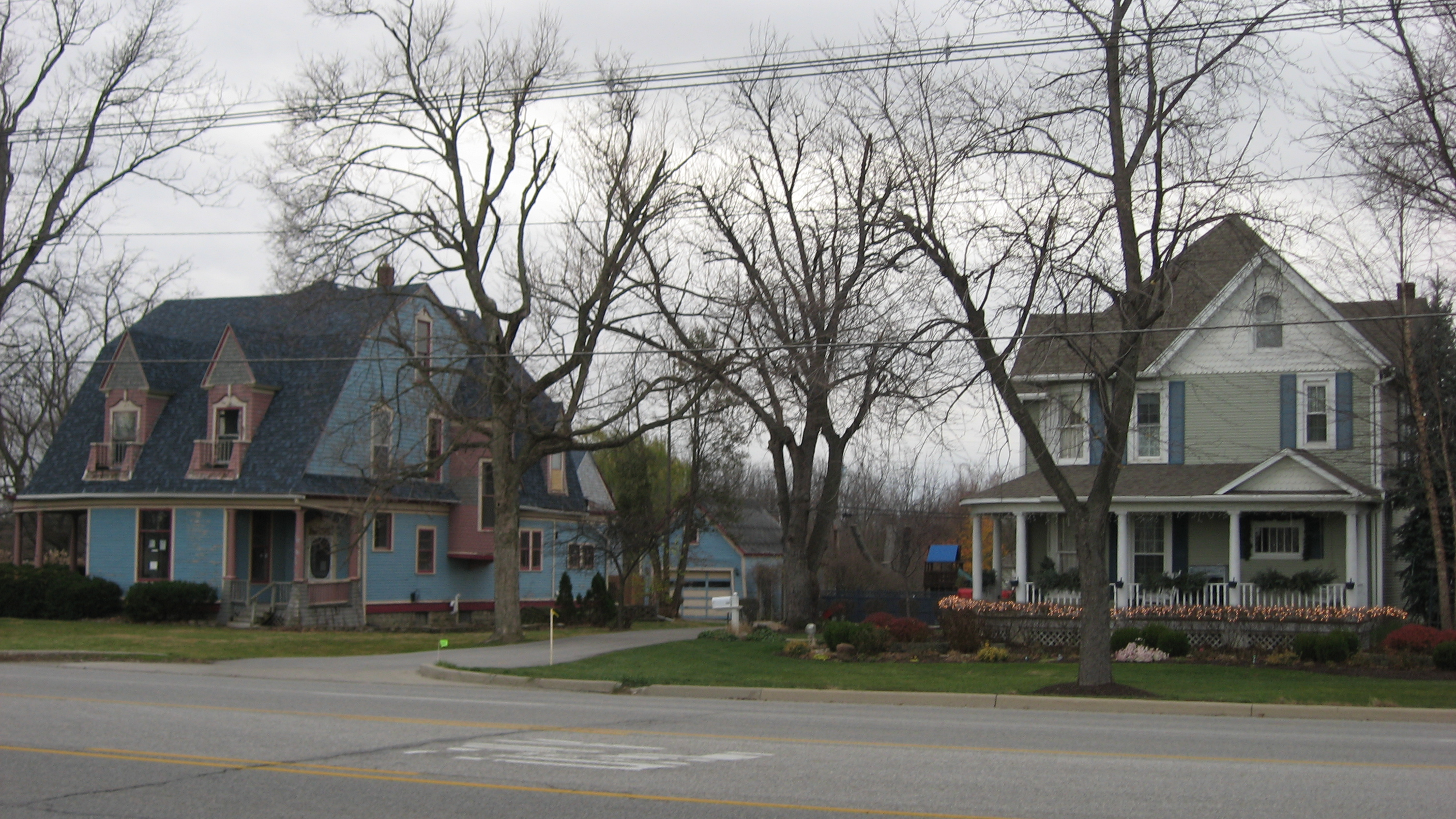
- Villa North Historic District, November 2011

- Location within Indiana Location within the United States
- Location: 706-760 and 707-731 N. Main St., Bluffton, Indiana
- Coordinates: 40°44′58″N 85°10′08″W
- Area: 10 acres (4.0 ha)
- Built: 1891
- Architect: Multiple
- Architectural style: Colonial Revival, Bungalow/craftsman, Queen Anne
- NRHP reference No.: 85001192
- Added to NRHP: June 4, 1985

Villa North Historic District is a national historic district located at Bluffton, Indiana. The district encompasses 24 contributing buildings in an exclusively residential section of Bluffton. It developed between about 1891 and 1915 and includes representative examples of Queen Anne, Colonial Revival, and Bungalow / American Craftsman style architecture. Notable contributing houses include the Lent Williamson Residence (Longfields, 1891), Amos King Residence (1894), Peter Beeler Residence (1899), and Wiley Messick Residence (c. 1915).

It was listed on the National Register of Historic Places in 1985.
