= Wells County Courthouse (Indiana) =

- U.S. National Register of Historic Places
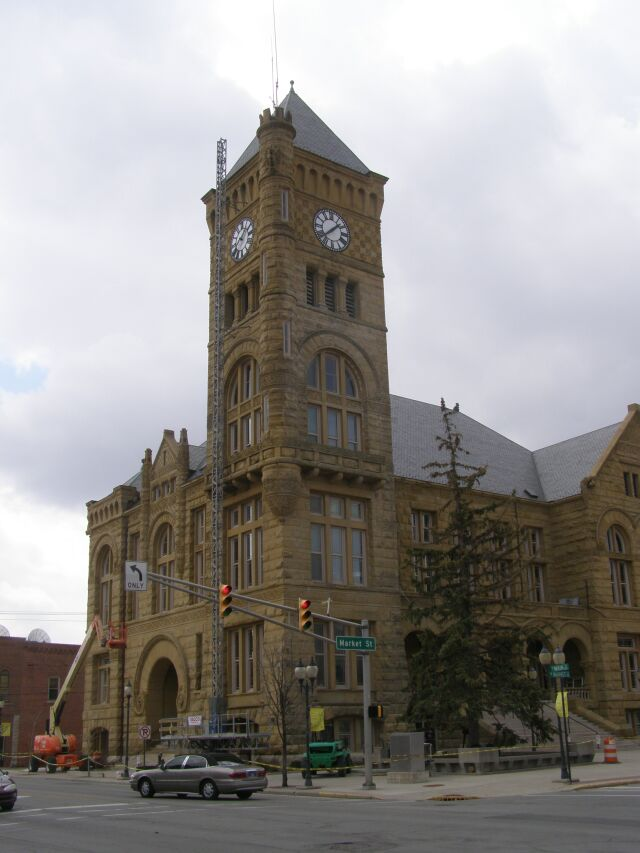
- Wells County Courthouse, April 2001

- Location within Indiana Location within the United States
- Location: 100 W. Market St., Bluffton, Indiana
- Coordinates: 40°44′22″N 85°10′19″W
- Area: less than one acre
- Built: 1889
- Architect: Bunting, George W.; Boeseker, Christian
- Architectural style: Romanesque, Richardsonian Romanesque
- NRHP reference No.: 79000028
- Added to NRHP: January 15, 1979

Wells County Courthouse is a historic courthouse located at Bluffton, Indiana. It was designed by architect George W. Bunting and built in 1889. It is a two-story, Richardsonian Romanesque style sandstone building topped by a high hipped roof. It has a gable roofed wing and features a four-level corner clock tower and corner turret.

It was listed on the National Register of Historic Places in 1979.
