= Urschel Laboratories =

Indiana-based retailer of food-processing machinery

Urschel Laboratories Inc.
- Formerly: Urschel Gooseberry Snipper Factory
- Industry: Food-processing machinery
- Founded: 1910; 115 years ago in Valparaiso, Indiana, United States
- Founder: William Urschel
- Headquarters: Chesterton, Indiana, United States
- Area served: Worldwide
- Key people: Rick Urschel, president and CEO
- Number of employees: 400 (2016)
- Website: www.urschel.com

Urschel Laboratories Inc. is a global retailer of food-processing machinery, based in Chesterton, Indiana. The company was founded by William Urschel in 1910, after he invented a gooseberry snipper. The company's headquarters were located on South Napoleon Street in Valparaiso, Indiana, from 1910 until 1957, when a new plant was constructed on Calumet Avenue, also in Valparaiso. The company moved to a new facility in nearby Chesterton in 2015.

== History ==
=== 1907–1930s ===
In 1907, William Emmett Urschel began experimental work on a gooseberry stemmer. Urschel received his first patent for the Gooseberry Snipper in 1908. In 1910, Urschel founded the Urschel Gooseberry Snipper Factory, a small two-story wooden shop at 158 South Napoleon in Valparaiso, Indiana, located next to his residence and in an area populated with gooseberry farmers. Urschel later invented a machine that provides chocolate coating on ice cream to make an Eskimo Pie.

In 1922, Urschel had invented and began selling the bean snipper, which increased the amount of beans canned each year, rising from approximately two million cases of canned beans in 1922 to more than six million cases in 1928. Beginning in 1923, Urschel's company began development of a mechanical green bean harvester, with backing from the Scott Viner company in Columbus, Ohio. William Urschel is the first known man to attempt to build such a machine. In 1925, Urschel began working on a red beet harvester and topper.

By 1929, the company had been renamed Urschel Laboratories. In August of that year, the company sent a mechanical green bean harvester to the Fremont Canning Company in Fremont, Michigan. At the time, green beans were only picked by hand. The harvesting machine, which was capable of picking 90 to 95 percent of beans in a given area, was driven by a self-contained gasoline motor, and was estimated to save approximately $500 per day by replacing human labor. Canning companies viewed the machine favorably as there was a lack of willing labor at the time to pick the beans by hand during the heat of the day. Urschel Laboratories was believed to be the only company to offer such a machine. Bean picking was one of the few agricultural activities where machinery had not been used.

Urschel's red beet harvester and topper – manufactured by the Scott Viner company and known as a Scott-Urschel product – was released in 1930, and was a success. At that time, the company employed 15 men who worked in the construction and perfection of Urschel's inventions. Only model-building experimentation took place at Urschel Laboratories, while production was handled by industrial producers. However, William Urschel planned to add 3,000 sq ft (280 m^{2}) of floor space to his factory with the intention to perform some manufacturing at the plant. The green bean picker was still in development as of 1930, at which point William Urschel was also perfecting a sugar beet harvester, expected to be his among his most profitable products. Urschel had also perfected an onion topper and a vegetable peeler. By November 1936, Urschel Laboratories had manufactured several canning machines for Chivers and Sons, which was in negotiations to purchase a red beet harvester. At that time, Urschel Laboratories was working on the first machine that would be used to cut celery for canning.

=== 1940s–1950s ===
At the beginning of World War II, Urschel Laboratories was instructed to cease its manufacturing of food-processing machinery and to convert completely to the manufacture of war machines. Urschel Laboratories manufactured shell loading and assembly equipment, as well as testing devices and engine parts for experimental aircraft. Urschel Laboratories was later instructed to build equipment for the food dehydration industry for the remainder of the war. In 1942, the company had approximately 50 employees.

In February 1946, Joe Urschel, general manager of Urschel Laboratories and William Urschel's son, announced that the company would expand its manufacturing operations with a 20,000 sq ft (1,900 m^{2}) building, which was to begin construction in spring 1947. The new building was to be located on five acres of land that the company purchased on Roosevelt Road, north of Evans Avenue. The company's then-current building on South Napoleon Street would be retained for experimental laboratory purposes and for some manufacturing, while Joe Urschel would be in charge of the new building. At the time, Urschel Laboratories had 35 employees and was among the best-known companies in the industry of food-processing machinery.

In June 1946, William Urschel announced his latest invention, an eight-legged machine that had been in development for two years and which he referred to as Frankenstein's Horse. The machine, then in the testing phase, was intended to replace Caterpillars in certain conditions, and was the first of its kind to be patented. In 1947, William Urschel announced a small, portable cement-laying machine that was still in the experimental stage. The machine was later used in the construction of some of Urschel Laboratories' factory buildings. William Urschel, at the age of 68, died in September 1948, after suffering with an illness for two years. Joe Urschel was the company president at the time. In 1950, the company was experimenting with a new machine capable of cutting sweet corn from the cob.

In June 1951, the company announced plans for a new processing machine that would result in juicier hamburgers that would be more digestible. Joe Urschel had worked on the machine for four and a half years, beginning after requests from meat packers who wanted a new and improved method for making hamburgers. Urschel planned to continue perfecting the machine for small meat markets, and was developing the device for the Sprague-Sells division of the Food Machinery and Chemical Corporation. Urschel stated that the machine would not be available for another two years because of the lengthy production needed to manufacture it. However, a sample of the machine was in use at the local Bill's Meat Market, which sold "Urschelburgers." The new machine marked the company's entry into the meat industry. At that time, nearly all commercially cut vegetables and fruits were processed by Urschel machinery.

In April 1953, the company announced an expansion at its South Napoleon plant that would consist of a new one-story 4,000 sq ft (370 m^{2}) building, to be completed in 60 days, with the purpose of housing additional industrial machinery. The addition was constructed on the property's northwest corner and was connected to the pre-existing factory.

=== 1957–1980s ===
In February 1957, Urschel Laboratories planned to spend $150,000 to $200,000 to relocate its South Napoleon headquarters to a new location, to be constructed on 18 acres of land at 2503 North Calumet Avenue, north of Valparaiso, along the west side of Indiana State Road 49. The new site would offer 30 percent more space than the current plant. Construction was to begin that spring, with Joe Urschel hoping to have it completed by August 1957. The building was to be designed in a way that would allow future additions to be constructed with minimum difficulty. The company had 56 employees at the time. Foundation work for the new one-story plant was underway in June 1957. The building was nearing completion at the end of August 1957. Urschel Laboratories began occupying the building at the end of September 1957.

In May 1959, construction began on a 10,000 square feet (930 m^{2}) addition, scheduled for completion within 60 days. The addition would expand the company's shop and experimental laboratory facilities. The company celebrated its 50th anniversary on October 6, 1960, with an open house attended by 3,000 people. The addition of a 1,000 sq ft (93 m^{2}) tool room was announced in November 1960, due to an increase in business. The addition neared completion in January 1961. By that time, Urschel Laboratories was the world's largest producer of food processing machines, and the company's products had global distribution. In April 1961, construction began on a larger, $125,000 expansion that would increase the company's plant by 110 percent.

In 1970, the company had 130 employees. In January 1973, Urschel Laboratories began operating its own stainless steel casting foundry, the first to be constructed in Porter County, Indiana. The foundry would manufacture parts for the company's machines. The company also announced the opening of Urschel International Limited, a London-based sales and warehousing office, with plans to ultimately expand across the entire European continent. At that time, the company had business dealings in 50 countries. On July 2, 1973, ground was broken for a 5,000 sq ft (460 m^{2}) advertising and marketing complex on the north side of the company's property, at a cost of $100,000. The building would house the company's advertising agency, Vale Communications.

In 1975, U.S. Vice President Nelson Rockefeller presented the President's "E" Award to Urschel Laboratories for "excellence in exporting," in recognition of the company's contributions to the increase of U.S. trade in foreign countries. At that time, the company had business dealings with 70 countries, to which it exported nearly 50 percent of its machinery. In 1976, Urschel Laboratories manufactured a time capsule that was buried that year at Valparaiso's Bicentennial Park, with the intention of unburying it 100 years later.

=== 1990s–present ===
Profits for the company's fiscal year of 1992 totaled $43 million. By May 1993, Joe Urschel served as the company's chairman, while his son, Robert Urschel, was the company's president. At that time, approximately 60 percent of the company's machines were sold abroad, in more than 100 countries. By that point, Urschel Laboratories had begun manufacturing equipment for pharmaceutical companies.

Joe Urschel died in June 1996, at the age of 82. At the time of his death, he held 73 patents on machines used in the industries of chemical, food, and pharmaceutical, with his first patent issued at the age of 22. The company manufactured approximately 40 types of food-processing equipment at that time; George Sigler, the company's treasurer, said, "Virtually every meal we eat contains food that has been processed on Urschel equipment."

By 2004, after a period of two years, a new $3.5 million foundry had been constructed for the manufacture of stainless steel parts for the company's machines. In 2004, the company had 250 employees. Up to that time, the company had never experienced a financial loss in any year of its operation. By that time, Urschel Laboratories' conference room also acted as a museum to the company's history. Also on display at the plant was William Urschel's original gooseberry snipper prototype.

By summer 2011, the company's 250,000 sq ft (23,000 m^{2}) facility had been expanded either 10 or 29 times since its construction in 1957, and private discussions had begun regarding the need for a new facility on 20 to 30 acres. In January 2012, the company publicly announced its plans to begin construction on a new facility the following year, with a location to be determined. In July 2013, more than 300 employees participated in a groundbreaking ceremony for the new headquarters, to be located on nearly 160 acres in nearby Chesterton, Indiana. Construction was expected to last 18 months. The new facility opened on August 31, 2015. It was built at a cost of $80 million, and was 40 percent larger than the company's previous facility. At that time, Urschel Laboratories was one of the largest employers in Porter County.

In November 2015, the company announced that it would demolish its old headquarters on Calumet Avenue, rather than trying to sell or lease the buildings, which sat on 14.8 acres. That month, Family Express Corporation announced plans to purchase the property and construct a convenience store on the land. Demolition was underway in January 2016.

In March 2016, company president and chief executive officer Rick Urschel, a fourth-generation member of the family, announced that ownership of the company would be transferred to 400 employees through stocks, because of "uncertainty of the ability or willingness of the fifth generation to run the business. This decision was not an easy one to come by, and has been in the works for nearly a year." Since its inception in 1910, Urschel Laboratories has never laid off an employee.

== Subsidiaries ==
Indiana Information Controls, Inc., a data processing firm and a wholly owned subsidiary of Urschel Laboratories, was opened in January 1967. In 1969, Urschel Development Corporation was formed to develop 250 acres of land that William Urschel had purchased before his death. In January 1974, the company announced Phase One of its Vale Park luxury apartment complex on Vale Park Road, with completion planned for later that fall.

As of 1976, Indiana Information Controls processed the work of 55 banks in Indiana, Michigan, and Illinois, and also processed the payrolls and other records of 170 organizations. Indiana Information Controls was sold in 1992, as Joe Urschel said that the industry of food-processing machines "is much more important to us. The management was getting thin and it was taking away from what we do best."
