= Vera Cruz, Indiana =

- Town
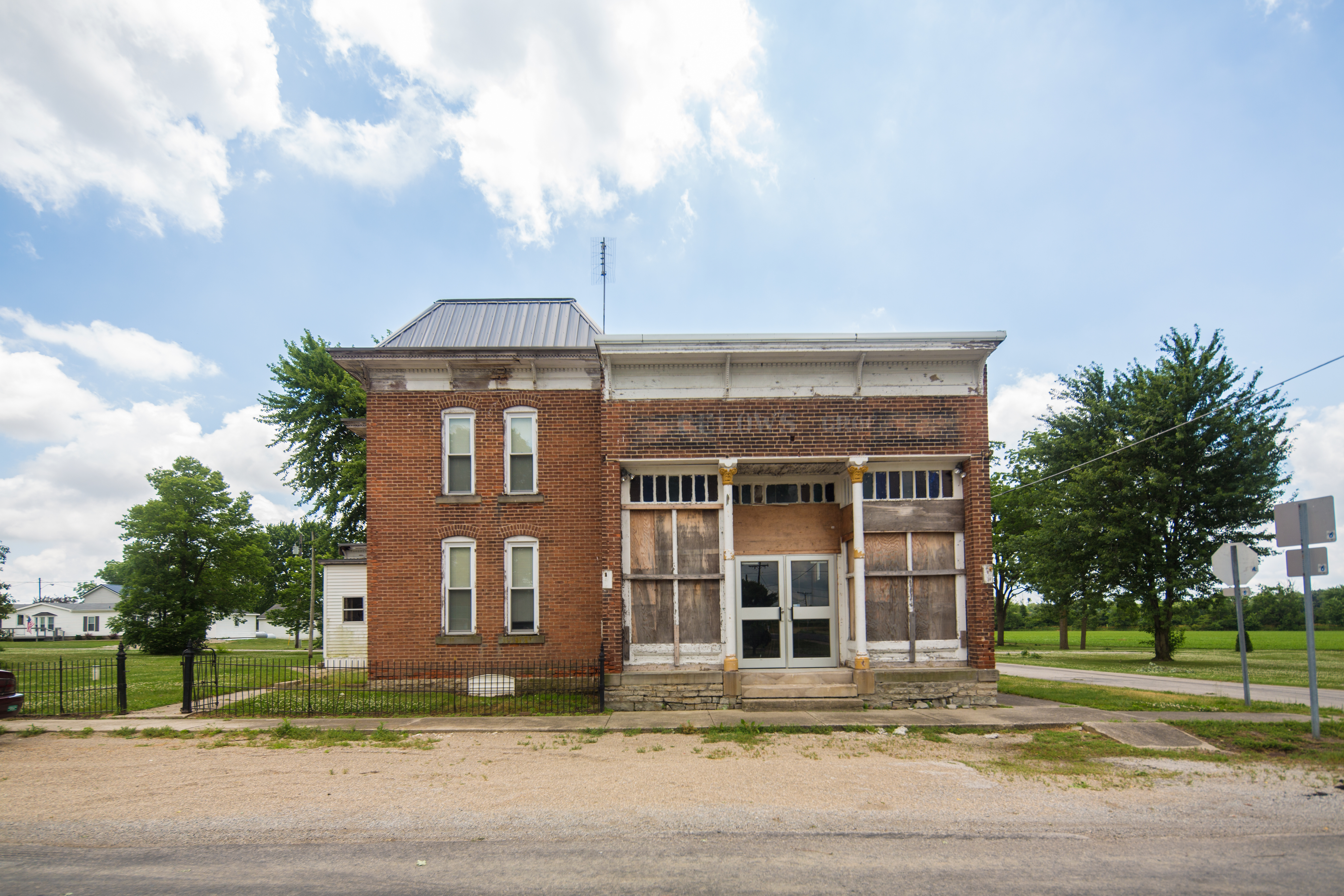
- Former post office

- Location of Vera Cruz in Wells County, Indiana.
- Coordinates: 40°42′06″N 85°04′46″W
- Country: United States
- State: Indiana
- County: Wells
- Township: Harrison

Area
  - Total: 0.10 sq mi (0.26 km^{2})
  - Land: 0.10 sq mi (0.26 km^{2})
  - Water: 0 sq mi (0.00 km^{2})
- Elevation: 827 ft (252 m)

Population (2020)
  - Total: 72
  - Density: 709.7/sq mi (274.01/km^{2})
- Time zone: UTC−05:00 (Eastern (EST))
  - Summer (DST): UTC−04:00 (EDT)
- ZIP code: 46714
- Area code: 260
- FIPS code: 18-78776
- GNIS feature ID: 2397712

Vera Cruz is a town in Harrison Township, Wells County, in the U.S. state of Indiana. The population was 72 at the 2020 census.

== History ==
Vera Cruz was laid out in 1848, and was named after Veracruz, Mexico. Originally, the town was named Newville, but the US Post Office had to have the name changed because there was another town named Newville in DeKalb County, Indiana. When selecting a county seat, Wells county chose between Newville and Bluffton because, at the time, they were about the same size. Ultimately, Bluffton was named the county seat, probably because of its more central location in Wells County. A post office was established at Vera Cruz in 1850, and remained in operation until it was discontinued in 1942.

== Geography ==
According to the 2010 census, Vera Cruz has a total area of 0.101 square miles (0.26 km^{2}), of which 0.1 square miles (0.26 km^{2}) (or 99.01%) is land and 0.001 square miles (0.00 km^{2}) (or 0.99%) is water.

== Demographics ==
Historical population
Census	Pop.	Note	%±
1880	260		—
1890	233		−10.4%
1900	199		−14.6%
1910	133		−33.2%
1920	113		−15.0%
1930	94		−16.8%
1940	142		51.1%
1950	143		0.7%
1960	176		23.1%
1970	140		−20.5%
1980	117		−16.4%
1990	83		−29.1%
2000	55		−33.7%
2010	80		45.5%
2020	72		−10.0%
U.S. Decennial Census

=== 2010 census ===
As of the census of 2010, there were 80 people, 31 households, and 24 families living in the town. The population density was 800.0 inhabitants per square mile (308.9/km^{2}). There were 32 housing units at an average density of 320.0 per square mile (123.6/km^{2}). The racial makeup of the town was 93.8% White, 5.0% from other races, and 1.3% from two or more races. Hispanic or Latino of any race were 5.0% of the population.

There were 31 households, of which 41.9% had children under the age of 18 living with them, 61.3% were married couples living together, 6.5% had a female householder with no husband present, 9.7% had a male householder with no wife present, and 22.6% were non-families. 19.4% of all households were made up of individuals. The average household size was 2.58 and the average family size was 2.92.

The median age in the town was 28 years. 27.5% of residents were under the age of 18; 13.9% were between the ages of 18 and 24; 28.9% were from 25 to 44; 20.1% were from 45 to 64; and 10% were 65 years of age or older. The gender makeup of the town was 50.0% male and 50.0% female.

=== 2000 census ===
As of the census of 2000, there were 55 people, 24 households, and 13 families living in the town. The population density was 635.1 inhabitants per square mile (245.2/km^{2}). There were 25 housing units at an average density of 288.7 per square mile (111.5/km^{2}). The racial makeup of the town was 98.18% White, 1.82% from other races. Hispanic or Latino of any race were 1.82% of the population.

There were 24 households, out of which 33.3% had children under the age of 18 living with them, 54.2% were married couples living together, 4.2% had a female householder with no husband present, and 41.7% were non-families. 41.7% of all households were made up of individuals, and 29.2% had someone living alone who was 65 years of age or older. The average household size was 2.29 and the average family size was 3.21.

In the town, the population was spread out, with 29.1% under the age of 18, 14.5% from 18 to 24, 18.2% from 25 to 44, 14.5% from 45 to 64, and 23.6% who were 65 years of age or older. The median age was 34 years. For every 100 females, there were 96.4 males. For every 100 females age 18 and over, there were 105.3 males.

The median income for a household in the town was $20,625, and the median income for a family was $36,250. Males had a median income of $31,250 versus $25,000 for females. The per capita income for the town was $11,963. None of the population and none of the families were below the poverty line.
