= Ouabache State Park =

State park in Indiana, United States

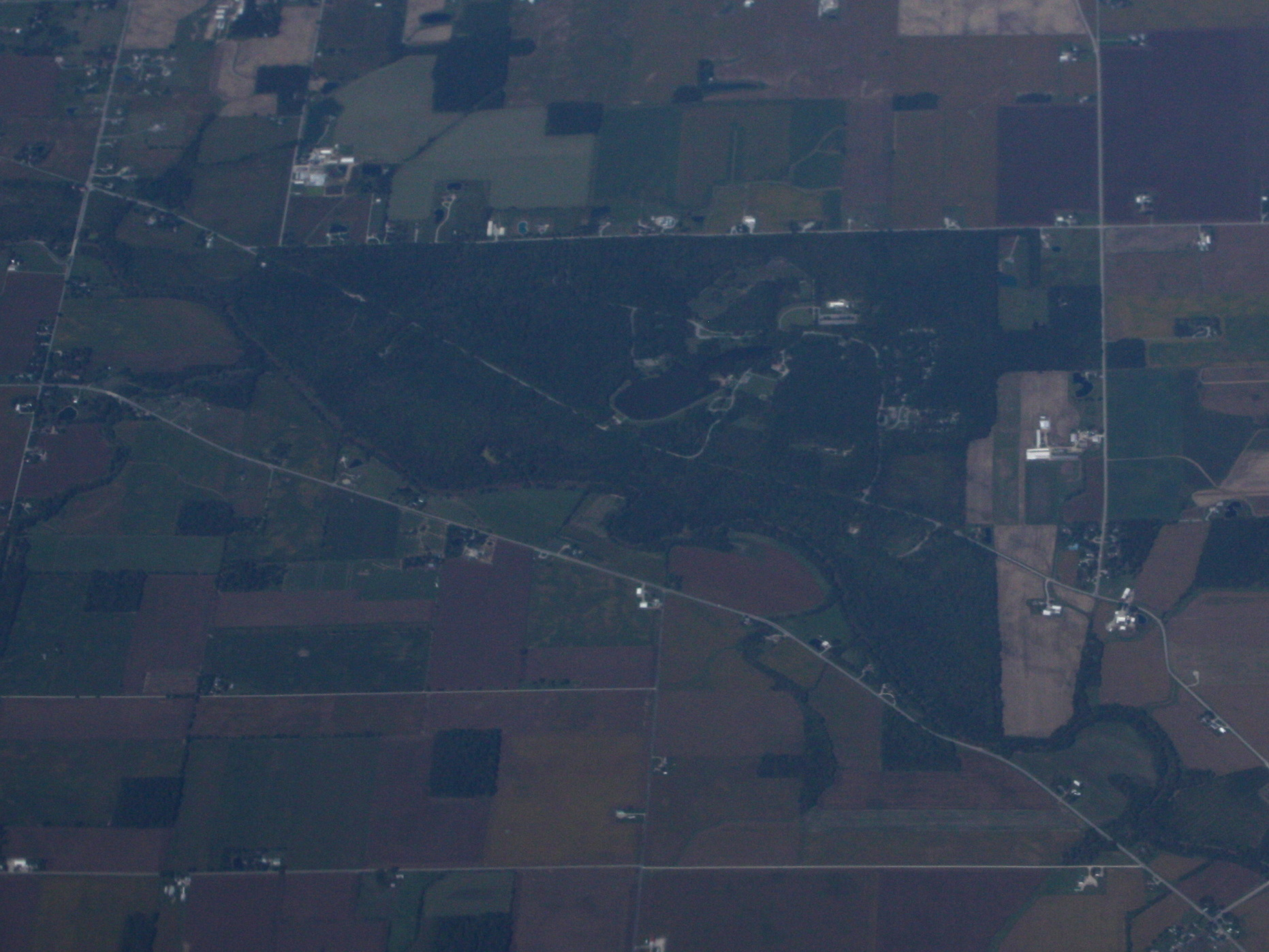
- Oblique air photo of Ouabache State Park in September 2018

- Location within Indiana
- Location: Wells County, Indiana, USA
- Nearest city: Bluffton, Indiana
- Coordinates: 40°43′12″N 85°6′36″W
- Area: 1,104 acres (447 ha)
- Established: 1962
- Visitors: 199,822 (in 2018–2019)
- Governing body: Indiana Department of Natural Resources
- Website: www.in.gov/dnr/parklake/2975.htm

Ouabache [wɑːbɑː'ʃi] (a French transcription of the Miami Indian word for the river, waapaahšiiki, meaning "it shines white", or "shining water over white stones") is a state park in Indiana. It is located 30 miles (48 km) south of Fort Wayne, Indiana near Bluffton, Indiana. It was originally the Wells County State Forest and Game Preserve, formed in the early 1930s. In 1962 it became the Ouabache State Recreation Area, before finally achieving state park status in 1983.

The Wabash River runs through the park, which provides fishing and nature viewing. A 100-foot (30 m) fire tower offers an excellent view of the park. The park receives about 200,000 visitors annually.

Until the 1960s, when the practice was stopped, it was the greatest producer of chicks of pheasants and quails in the United States, making it known as the "Greatest Wildlife Laboratory in the U.S." Remnants of some of the old pens can still be seen.

During the Great Depression, workers from the Civilian Conservation Corps (CCC) helped to improve the park through various construction projects. Today, in the park's picnic area, is a statue commemorating the CCC's work in the park. The Friends of Ouabache State Park organization led a two-year fundraising effort to build the statue. The statue was dedicated in 2014. Similar statues commemorating the CCC exist across the United States, but the only other such statue in Indiana is in Versailles State Park in Ripley County.

The park was 1 of 14 Indiana State Parks that was in the path of totality for the 2024 solar eclipse, with the park experiencing 2 minutes and 47 seconds of totality.
