= Bluffton, Indiana =

- City
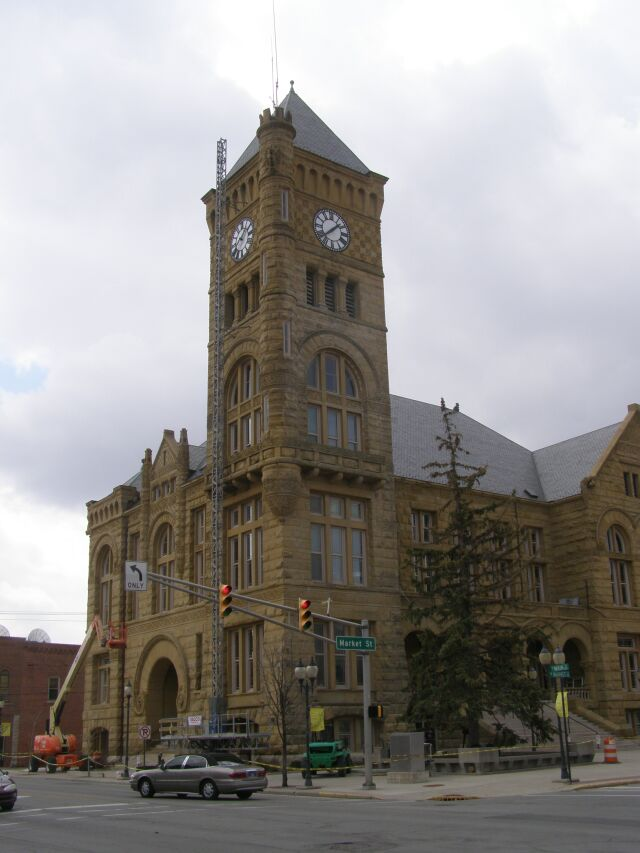
- The Wells County Courthouse is listed on the National Register of Historic Places

- Flag
- Motto: "The Parlor City"
- Location of Bluffton in Wells County, Indiana.
- Coordinates: 40°45′17″N 85°10′00″W
- Country: United States
- State: Indiana
- County: Wells
- Township: Harrison, Lancaster

Government
  - Type: Mayor-council government
  - Mayor: Scott Mentzer (R)

Area
  - Total: 8.52 sq mi (22.06 km^{2})
  - Land: 8.39 sq mi (21.72 km^{2})
  - Water: 0.13 sq mi (0.34 km^{2})
- Elevation: 807 ft (246 m)

Population (2020)
  - Total: 10,308
  - Density: 1,229.1/sq mi (474.57/km^{2})
- Time zone: UTC-5 (EST)
  - Summer (DST): UTC-4 (EDT)
- ZIP code: 46714
- Area code: 260
- FIPS code: 18-06220
- GNIS ID: 2394209
- Website: blufftonindiana.net

Bluffton is a city in and the county seat of Wells County, Indiana, United States. It sits on the banks of the Wabash River in the northeastern part of the state. The population was 10,308 at the 2020 census, up from 9,897 at the 2010 census. Bluffton is nicknamed the "Parlor City" for its history of having some of the first clean paved streets in the area during the time of the Indiana gas boom.

== History ==
=== Early settlement and incorporation ===
The first non-Native American settlers arrived in what is now Bluffton in 1835. They arrived as a result of the end of the Black Hawk War as well as the completion of the Erie Canal. They consisted entirely of settlers from New England. These were "Yankee" settlers, that is to say they were descended from the English Puritans who settled New England in the colonial era. They were primarily members of the Congregational Church though due to the Second Great Awakening many of them had converted to Methodism and some had become Baptists before coming to what is now Bluffton. The Congregational Church subsequently has gone through many divisions and some factions are now known as the Church of Christ and Church of God. When the New England settlers arrived in what is now Bluffton there was nothing but a dense virgin forest and wild prairie.

Bluffton was platted in 1838, it was named for river bluffs near the original town site. The Bluffton post office has been in operation since 1839. In its early years it was a primitive, backwoods village, subject to frequent floods of the Wabash and outbreaks of malaria. Wells Country was organized in 1837 and shortly thereafter four commissioners were appointed to choose the county seat. The contestants for the county seat of government were Bluffton, Vera Cruz and Murray, but it was later narrowed to just two, Bluffton and Murray. The four commissioners struggled to determine the location of the county seat at first, but on March 5, 1838, Bluffton was named the county seat after their final vote. Mr. Abraham Studabaker and Robert C. Bennet, both landowners in Bluffton, set aside land for a county courthouse and donated US$270 (equivalent to $8,163 in 2025). On March 9, 1838, the commissioners chose the site for the county courthouse which used the land donated by Abram Studabaker and Robert C. Bennet "with a reserve of two choice lots".

The first county courthouse was erected in 1840 by David Whitman. it was a 2-story building located on the west side of Main Street, between Market and Wabash streets.

Bluffton was incorporated in 1851 with 850 people.

"We met at the house of Robert C. Bennett, in said county of Wells, on the first Monday of March, 1838, and have selected the west half of the northeast quarter of Section 4, Township 26, Range 12, for the site for the seat of justice of Wells County, which land was donated by Abram Studabaker with a reserve of two choice lots. He also donated 31.90 acres off the east end of the south half of the southwest quarter of Section 33, Town 27, Range 12 east. Robert C. Bennett donates the southeast fraction of the northeast corner. Studabaker and Bennett also donated $270 in cash."

— The report by the commissioners:, "Signed, March 9, 1838, Christopher Hanna, John Rogers, William Kizer, Zachariah Smith, Locating Commissioners."

=== Industrial growth ===
In 1848, the idea of a 10-mile planked road from Bluffton to Fort Wayne gained popularity throughout the city. In 1849 a ten-mile stretch of the plank road was constructed by city locals. From 1852 to 1856 the road was planked before being disused – replaced by a gravel road.

As early as the 1840s and 1850s there were plans made for railroads. However, none of them had been successful. In 1852 the first railroad known as the Fort Wayne, Cincinnati Louisville Railroad was surveyed but it was delayed due to the Civil War. From 1867 - 1868 the railroad began construction through Bluffton and by 1869 it was completed. The advent of the railroad brought great prosperity to Bluffton and would help ditch the numerous swamps that brought risks such as malaria and flooding.

In the 1890s the construction of the iconic 5 story Richardsonian Romanesque style sandstone courthouse was completed, ushering in a new era for Bluffton and Wells County. Bluffton was included in the corporate name of the short-lived Cincinnati, Bluffton and Chicago Railroad, founded in 1903. The railroad's Bluffton bridge collapsed on May 22, 1913, and the struggling carrier went out of business shortly thereafter.

=== African American history ===
Bluffton is one of the first towns in Indiana, and across America, to both publicly acknowledge its history of exclusion as a sundown town and to promote itself as an inclusive town. In 2006, Bluffton was featured in USA Today as an inclusive town that was putting up welcoming, inclusive signs at all local schools as well as at the entrances of three state highways. Mayor Ted Ellis was noted in the article for his helping Bluffton become one of the first to join the National League of Cities' Partnership for Working Toward Inclusive Communities.

=== The Parlor City ===
The City of Bluffton is nicknamed the "Parlor City" for its history of having some of the first clean paved streets in the area during the time of the Trenton Oil boom. Most streets at the time were dirt. The nickname came from the fact that the parlor in someone's home at the time would be the cleanest room in the house because that is the first space that your guests see when they come into your home. Entering downtown today, the brand-new Parlor City Plaza acts as the first thing you see, along with the historic courthouse, justifying the "Parlor City" nickname.

== Geography ==
According to the 2010 census, Bluffton has a total area of 8.359 square miles (21.65 km^{2}), of which 8.23 square miles (21.32 km^{2}) (or 98.46%) is land and 0.129 square miles (0.33 km^{2}) (or 1.54%) is water.

=== Climate ===
Climate data for Bluffton, Indiana (1991–2020 normals, extremes 1971–present)
Month	Jan	Feb	Mar	Apr	May	Jun	Jul	Aug	Sep	Oct	Nov	Dec	Year
Record high °F (°C)	67 (19)	74 (23)	86 (30)	87 (31)	95 (35)	100 (38)	104 (40)	99 (37)	97 (36)	90 (32)	79 (26)	70 (21)	104 (40)
Mean maximum °F (°C)	56.1 (13.4)	58.7 (14.8)	70.3 (21.3)	80.4 (26.9)	87.5 (30.8)	92.0 (33.3)	92.6 (33.7)	90.8 (32.7)	89.3 (31.8)	82.1 (27.8)	68.9 (20.5)	57.6 (14.2)	94.4 (34.7)
Mean daily maximum °F (°C)	31.9 (−0.1)	35.6 (2.0)	46.7 (8.2)	59.9 (15.5)	71.1 (21.7)	79.6 (26.4)	82.6 (28.1)	80.9 (27.2)	75.6 (24.2)	63.2 (17.3)	48.9 (9.4)	37.2 (2.9)	59.4 (15.2)
Daily mean °F (°C)	24.5 (−4.2)	27.4 (−2.6)	37.3 (2.9)	49.3 (9.6)	60.8 (16.0)	70.0 (21.1)	73.0 (22.8)	71.0 (21.7)	64.7 (18.2)	52.8 (11.6)	40.6 (4.8)	30.1 (−1.1)	50.1 (10.1)
Mean daily minimum °F (°C)	17.2 (−8.2)	19.2 (−7.1)	27.9 (−2.3)	38.7 (3.7)	50.6 (10.3)	60.4 (15.8)	63.3 (17.4)	61.2 (16.2)	53.7 (12.1)	42.4 (5.8)	32.2 (0.1)	23.0 (−5.0)	40.8 (4.9)
Mean minimum °F (°C)	−4.4 (−20.2)	1.3 (−17.1)	10.9 (−11.7)	24.6 (−4.1)	36.2 (2.3)	47.2 (8.4)	52.7 (11.5)	50.7 (10.4)	40.6 (4.8)	29.1 (−1.6)	18.6 (−7.4)	5.7 (−14.6)	−7.6 (−22.0)
Record low °F (°C)	−24 (−31)	−18 (−28)	−7 (−22)	8 (−13)	22 (−6)	37 (3)	41 (5)	40 (4)	27 (−3)	10 (−12)	5 (−15)	−18 (−28)	−24 (−31)
Average precipitation inches (mm)	2.51 (64)	1.96 (50)	2.65 (67)	3.83 (97)	4.67 (119)	4.71 (120)	4.46 (113)	3.84 (98)	3.07 (78)	2.92 (74)	3.08 (78)	2.33 (59)	40.03 (1,017)
Average snowfall inches (cm)	7.6 (19)	6.5 (17)	3.6 (9.1)	0.4 (1.0)	0.0 (0.0)	0.0 (0.0)	0.0 (0.0)	0.0 (0.0)	0.0 (0.0)	0.0 (0.0)	1.1 (2.8)	4.1 (10)	23.3 (59)
Average precipitation days (≥ 0.01 in)	12.8	10.7	11.3	13.1	13.3	11.6	9.5	9.2	8.1	10.4	10.8	12.6	133.4
Average snowy days (≥ 0.1 in)	5.2	4.0	1.9	0.4	0.0	0.0	0.0	0.0	0.0	0.0	0.7	3.0	15.2
Source: NOAA

== Demographics ==
Historical population
Census	Pop.	Note	%±
1850	477		—
1860	760		59.3%
1870	1,131		48.8%
1880	2,354		108.1%
1890	3,589		52.5%
1900	4,479		24.8%
1910	4,987		11.3%
1920	5,391		8.1%
1930	5,074		−5.9%
1940	5,417		6.8%
1950	6,076		12.2%
1960	6,238		2.7%
1970	8,297		33.0%
1980	8,705		4.9%
1990	9,020		3.6%
2000	9,536		5.7%
2010	9,897		3.8%
2020	10,308		4.2%
U.S. Decennial Census

=== 2020 census ===
As of the 2020 census, Bluffton had a population of 10,308. The median age was 39.1 years. 23.9% of residents were under the age of 18 and 19.3% of residents were 65 years of age or older. For every 100 females there were 93.7 males, and for every 100 females age 18 and over there were 90.4 males age 18 and over.

97.4% of residents lived in urban areas, while 2.6% lived in rural areas.

There were 4,345 households in Bluffton, of which 28.0% had children under the age of 18 living in them. Of all households, 43.9% were married-couple households, 18.9% were households with a male householder and no spouse or partner present, and 29.8% were households with a female householder and no spouse or partner present. About 33.8% of all households were made up of individuals and 15.2% had someone living alone who was 65 years of age or older.

There were 4,727 housing units, of which 8.1% were vacant. The homeowner vacancy rate was 1.6% and the rental vacancy rate was 11.6%.

Racial composition as of the 2020 census
Race	Number	Percent
White	9,367	90.9%
Black or African American	178	1.7%
American Indian and Alaska Native	25	0.2%
Asian	62	0.6%
Native Hawaiian and Other Pacific Islander	4	0.0%
Some other race	180	1.7%
Two or more races	492	4.8%
Hispanic or Latino (of any race)	519	5.0%

=== 2010 census ===
As of the 2010 census, there were 9,897 people, 4,112 households, and 2,585 families living in the city. The population density was 1,202.6 inhabitants per square mile (464.3/km^{2}). There were 4,532 housing units at an average density of 550.7 units per square mile (212.6 units/km^{2}). The racial makeup of the city was 96.0% White, 0.7% African American, 0.4% Native American, 0.5% Asian, 1.3% from other races, and 1.1% from two or more races. Hispanic or Latino of any race were 3.3% of the population.

There were 4,112 households, of which 31.3% had children under the age of 18 living with them, 46.9% were married couples living together, 11.3% had a female householder with no husband present, 4.7% had a male householder with no wife present, and 37.1% were non-families. 32.4% of all households were made up of individuals, and 13.4% had someone living alone who was 65 years of age or older. The average household size was 2.34 and the average family size was 2.93.

The median age in the city was 38.3 years. 24.6% of residents were under the age of 18; 8.8% were between the ages of 18 and 24; 24.3% were from 25 to 44; 25.3% were from 45 to 64; and 16.9% were 65 years of age or older. The gender makeup of the city was 48.0% male and 52.0% female.

=== 2000 census ===
As of the 2000 census, there were 9,536 people, 3,922 households, and 2,517 families living in the city. The population density was 1,442.7 inhabitants per square mile (557.0/km^{2}). There were 4,197 housing units at an average density of 635.0 units per square mile (245.2 units/km^{2}). The racial makeup of the city was 97.65% White, 0.34% African American, 0.22% Native American, 0.24% Asian, 0.07% Pacific Islander, 0.79% from other races, and 0.69% from two or more races. Hispanic or Latino of any race were 2.35% of the population.

There were 3,922 households, out of which 30.4% had children under the age of 18 living with them, 50.2% were married couples living together, 10.7% had a female householder with no husband present, and 35.8% were non-families. 31.4% of all households were made up of individuals, and 13.4% had someone living alone who was 65 years of age or older. The average household size was 2.35 and the average family size was 2.96.

In the city, the population was spread out, with 25.0% under the age of 18, 9.6% from 18 to 24, 27.7% from 25 to 44, 20.6% from 45 to 64, and 17.2% who were 65 years of age or older. The median age was 37 years. For every 100 females, there were 90.1 males. For every 100 females age 18 and over, there were 86.4 males.

The median income for a household in the city was $37,416, and the median income for a family was $45,294. Males had a median income of $33,088 versus $22,018 for females. The per capita income for the city was $19,118. About 6.4% of families and 9.0% of the population were below the poverty line, including 12.8% of those under age 18 and 10.3% of those age 65 or over.

== Arts and culture ==
Bluffton is home to the Bluffton Free Street Fair, the largest and oldest free street fair in Indiana. Starting in 1898, The Bluffton Free Street Fair was originally called the "Bluffton Street Fair and Wells County Agricultural Exposition."

The Stewart-Studebaker House, Villa North Historic District, and Wells County Courthouse are listed on the National Register of Historic Places. The John A. Grove House is formerly listed.

== Education ==
Public school districts include Bluffton Harrison Metropolitan School District and Northern Wells Community Schools District.

Bluffton has a public library, a branch of the Wells County Public Library.

== Media ==
Bluffton is served by one newspaper, The Bluffton News Banner (Published all days of the week except Sunday). It is available all throughout Wells County. It was founded in 1892.

== Healthcare ==
Bluffton is home to Bluffton Regional Medical Center, one of Lutheran Health Networks nine locations.

== Notable people ==
- Adam Ballinger, basketball player
- Randy Borror, member of Indiana House of Representatives
- Joseph S. Dailey, Justice of the Indiana Supreme Court
- Charles Clemon Deam, botanist; born in Bluffton in 1865
- D'Wayne Eskridge, NFL American football player
- Chandler Harnish, quarterback, MVP of 2010 Humanitarian Bowl, NFL draft's 2012 "Mr. Irrelevant"; born in Bluffton
- Verdi Karns, ragtime composer, born in Bluffton in 1882
- Don Lash, champion long-distance runner, won 1938 James E. Sullivan Award as top amateur athlete in U.S.; born in Bluffton in 1912
- Daniel Patrick Moynihan, former U.S. Senator from New York, former U.S. Ambassador to United Nations, former ambassador to India
- Everett Scott, former baseball player and member of the New York Yankees first World Series championship team 1923 and member of the Boston Red Sox Hall of fame.
- E. J. Tackett, professional ten-pin bowler on the PBA Tour
- Robert Tonner, fashion designer and doll artist; born in Bluffton in 1952

== See also ==
- List of sundown towns in the United States
