= Arester Earl =

African-American quilter (1892–1988)

Arester Earl (1892–1988) was an African-American quilter. Her quilts incorporated appliquéd, stuffed charms, vibrant colors, and fabric crosses arranged in patterns reflecting African spirituality and folklore.

== Personal life ==
Arester Earl was born in Covington, Georgia, United States, the daughter of a preacher/farmer who owned a farm of more than 1,000 acres. She picked up the art of quilt making from her stepmother and older sisters.

Robert Earl, Arester's husband, died in September 1937. She only returned to quilting in the 1970s after raising their five children. Though a native of Covington, Earl lived some part of her life in Macon, Georgia.

Earl died in 1988 in Atlanta, Georgia, at the age of 96.

== Artistic style and works ==
Earl's signature quilting style included individually stuffed colorful fabric blocks joined with long stitches, developed to accommodate her poor eyesight and paralysis on one side of her body. She quilted lying down in bed and is said to have remarked that quilting "means life to me".

Earl's use of vibrant colors also set her quilts apart. She reportedly favored bright colors because "they showed up better." Her unique style has been described as "off-beat," "improvisatory," "uneven," and "haphazard." The apparent imperfections of Earl's style highlights quilt making as a process.

Into her quilts, Early often sewed small red squares, which may have functioned as protective charms. Textile scholar Maude Southwell Wahlman called this pattern of bright squares contrasted with duller large squares, a "mojo" quilt. Like the stuffed shells in Earl's "Shell" quilt, representing the powers of the underwater realm, these elements symbolized Kongo spiritual beliefs. Earl confirmed that her use of the repeating cross motif echoed the Kongolese belief of the soul's return in the cycle of birth, life, and death and the common African-derived cosmogram patterns she encountered as a child.

She disclosed that her "Red-and-White Dream" quilt was inspired by childhood memories that returned to her in dreams. She reportedly dreamt of other patterns, too.

Earl was included in Wahlman and Ella King Torrey's 1983 book Ten Afro-American Quilters: Featuring Mozell Benson, Arester Earl, Johanna Pettway, Martha Jane Pettway, Plummer Pettway, Susie Ponds, Pearlie Posey, Sarah Mary Taylor, Lucinda Toomer, Pecolia Warner.

Ella King Torrey, former president of the San Francisco Art Institute, owned one of Earl's most famous pieces, "Log Cabin". The quilt, which hangs in her dining room, is part of the Torrey Quilt Collection.
