= Mississippi Museum of Art =

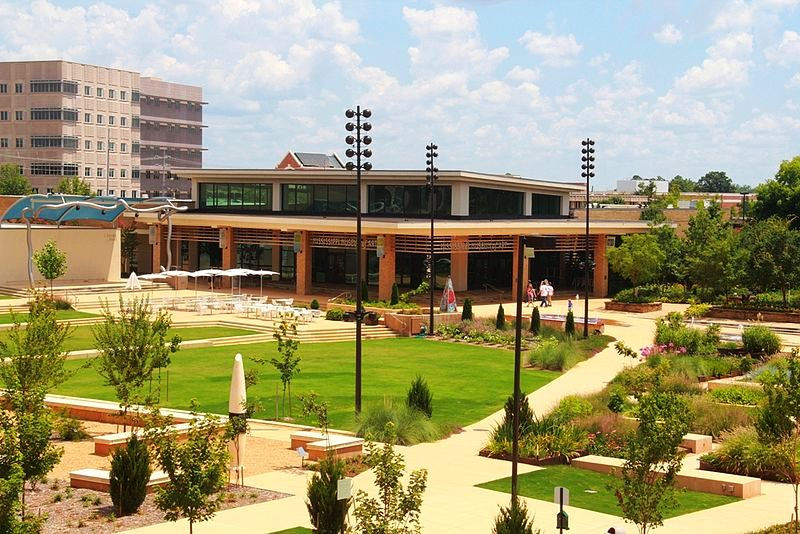
- Museum and Art Garden in 2012
- Location: 380 South Lamar Street; Jackson, Mississippi
- Coordinates: 32.29626°N 90.18569°W
- Type: Art museum
- Website: www.msmuseumart.org

The Mississippi Museum of Art (MMA) is a public museum in Jackson, Mississippi. It is the largest museum in Mississippi.

== Location ==
It is located at the corner of 380 South Lamar Street and 201 East Pascagoula Street in Jackson, Mississippi.

== History ==
The Mississippi Art Association was founded in 1911. By 1978, the Mississippi Museum of Art was founded, and it was located in the Arts Center of Mississippi until 2007. In November 2025 the MMA acquired the midcentury Fountainhead residence in Jackson, designed by Frank Lloyd Wright in the Usonian style.

== Permanent collection ==
The museum is the largest museum in Mississippi. Its permanent collection includes paintings by American, Mississippi and British painters as well as photographs, collage artworks and sculptures.

=== American painters ===
- Albert Bierstadt (1830–1902)
- Mary Cassatt (1844–1926)
- Arthur Bowen Davies (1863–1928)
- Robert Henri (1865–1921)
- George Inness (1825–1894)
- Jacob Lawrence (1917–2000)
- Georgia O'Keeffe (1887–1986)
- Reginald Marsh (1898–1954)
- Thomas Sully (1783–1872)
- James Abbott McNeill Whistler (1834–1903)

=== Photography, collage and sculpture ===
- Romare Bearden (1911–1988)
- William Beckwith (born 1952)
- Alexander Calder (1898–1976)
- Elizabeth Catlett (1915–2012)
- John DeAndrea (born 1941)
- William Eggleston (born 1939)
- Walker Evans (1903–1975)
- Howard Finster (1916–2001)
- Malvina Hoffman (1885–1966)
- Paul Manship (1985–1966)
- John Marin (1870–1953)
- Reuben Nakian (1897–1986)
- Cindy Sherman (born 1954)
- Jimmy Lee Sudduth (1910–2007)
- Sarah Mary Taylor (1916–2000)
- Mose Tolliver (1920–2006)
- Andy Warhol (1928–1987)

=== Mississippi and Southern artists ===
- Gaines Ruger Donoho (1857–1916)
- Eudora Welty (1909–2001)
- Theora Hamblett
- Ethel Wright Mohamed
- Sulton Rogers
- William Dunlap
- Sam Gilliam
- Birney Imes
- Valerie Jaudon
- Gwendolyn A. Magee
- Ken Marlow
- Ed McGowin
- Lallah Miles Perry (1926-2008)
- Tom Rankin
- Walter Inglis Anderson (1903–1965)
- Caroline Russell Compton
- Marie Hull
- Mary Katherine Loyacano McCravey
- George E. Ohr (1857–1918)
- Edgar Parker
- William R. Hollingsworth, Jr. (1910-1944)
