= McKinley Park (Chicago park) =

Park in Chicago, Illinois, US

Coordinates: 41°49′27″N 87°40′46″W

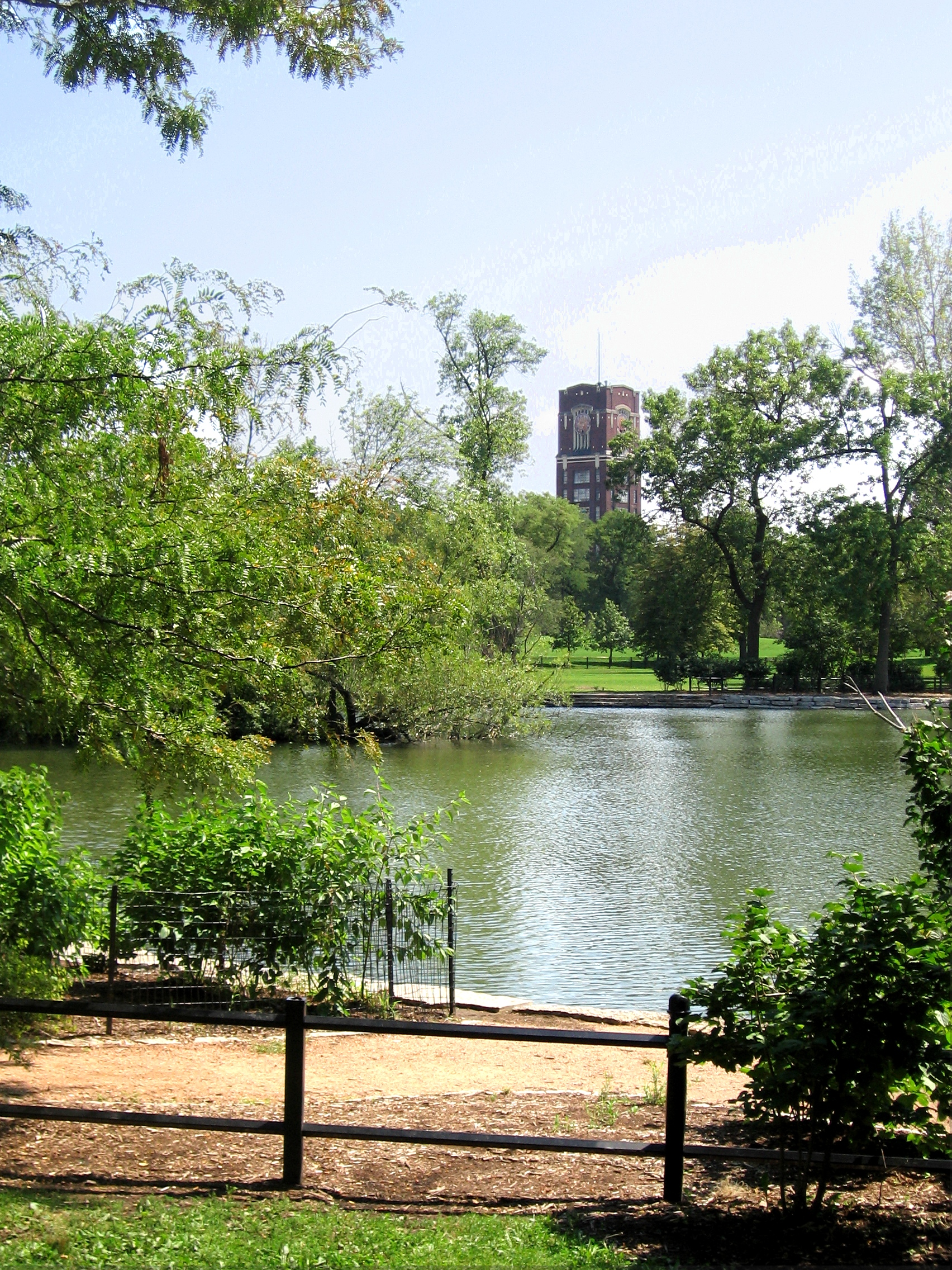
- McKinley Park Lagoon
- Interactive map of McKinley Park
- Type: Urban Park
- Location: Chicago, Cook County, Illinois
- Area: 71.75 acres (29.04 ha)
- Created: June 13, 1902
- Operator: Chicago Park District
- Website: https://www.chicagoparkdistrict.com/parks-facilities/mckinley-william-park

McKinley Park is a large (71.75 acre) park in the Chicago Park District located at 2210 W. Pershing Rd Chicago, IL 60609 in the McKinley Park community area on the South Side of Chicago. It is bounded by 37th Street and Archer Avenue on the north, Pershing Road on the south, Damen Avenue on the east and Western Boulevard on the west. It features a large lagoon, outdoor swimming pool, athletic fields, and fieldhouse with a gymnasium, auditorium and club room. The park is part of the Chicago park and boulevard system connecting the city's large parks. McKinley Park is listed as a contributing property under the Chicago Boulevard System Historic District on the National Register of Historic Places. The park opened in 1902 and is named for President William McKinley (1843–1901), following his assassination.

== History ==
The park was planned by the South Park Commission to be first of several large neighborhood parks located near the Union Stock Yards to better serve the residents of the overcrowded and impoverished area around the Stock Yards The site was built upon land previously occupied by the Brighton Park Race Track. The park's name was chosen to honor former President William McKinley only a month after his assassination in September 1901. The park opened to the public on June 13, 1902, in a dedication ceremony attended by over 10,000 people.

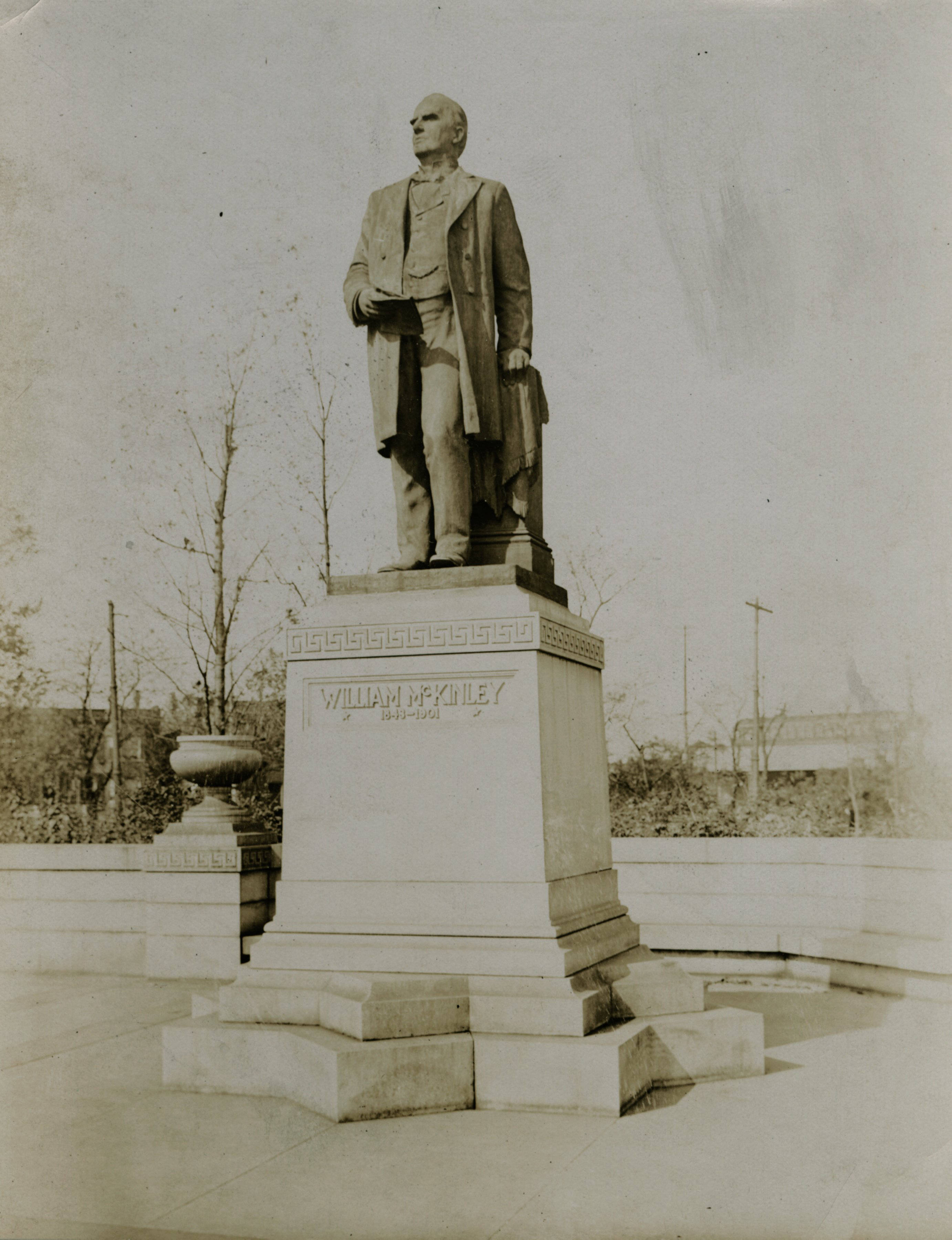
William McKinley Monument by Charles Mulligan, 1905.

A memorial statue of President McKinley by sculptor Charles Mulligan was unveiled on Independence Day, 1905 in ceremony attended by over 5,000 people. The statue is in the northwest corner of the park at the corner of Archer Avenue and Western Boulevard on the west The park was expanded in 1906 based on heavy patronage and add the lagoon on the east side. The field house was built in 1916 by architect D.H. Burnham & Company In 1934, the park became part of the Chicago Park District's portfolio when the independent city park districts were consolidated.

== Facilities ==
McKinley park is home to the McKinley fieldhouse, which includes a gymnasium and gymnastic center, offices and club rooms, as well as an outdoor pool and pool facilities. The park features a seasonal ice rink, an artificial turf field for soccer, multiple baseball fields, basketball courts, tennis courts, a playground, and picnic areas. The McKinley Park lagoon is adjacent to a natural area featuring native prairie, savannah, and aquatic plants, creating habitats for local birds and animals. The lagoon hosts an annual fishing derby, stocked annually by the Illinois Department of Natural Resources.

In 2019, McKinley Park became the first park in the South Side of Chicago to have a dog park.
