= Isham Warren Garrott =

American Confederate colonel

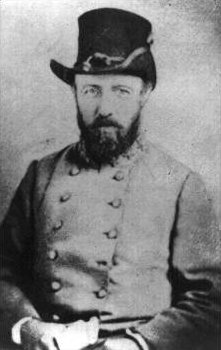
- Born: c. 1816; North Carolina
- Died: June 17, 1863 (aged 46–47); Vicksburg, Mississippi
- Military career
- Allegiance: Confederate States of America
- Branch: Confederate States Army
- Service years: 1861–63
- Rank: Colonel
- Commands: 20th Alabama Infantry Regiment
- Conflicts: American Civil War: Siege of Vicksburg†

Isham Warren Garrott (c. 1816 – June 17, 1863) was a colonel in the Confederate States Army during the American Civil War. Garrott was killed during the Vicksburg Campaign before his commission as a brigadier general was confirmed by the Confederate Senate or delivered and became effective.

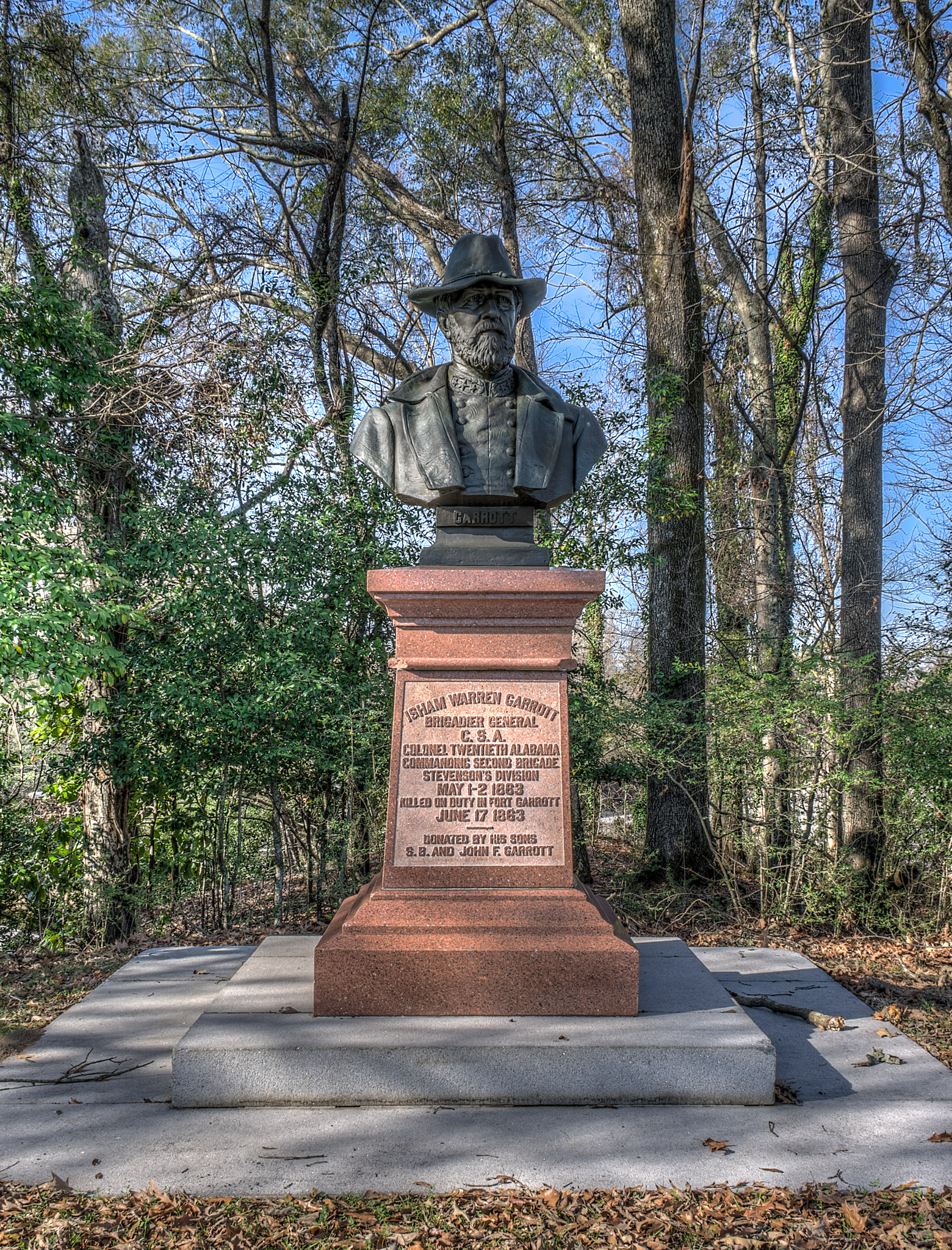
Bust of Garrott by William Couper, Vicksburg National Military Park

== Early life ==
Garrott was born in either Anson County or Wake County, North Carolina in about 1816. He graduated from the University of North Carolina at Chapel Hill and then studied law. In 1840, he moved to Marion, Alabama where he practiced law. Garrott was a member of the Whig Party and a Mason. Garrott was also an incorporator of the Marion and Alabama River Transportation Company and President of the Board of Trustees of Howard College. He was elected to the Alabama House of Representatives in 1845 and 1847. Garrott served as an elector for John C. Breckinridge's failed 1860 Presidential Election campaign. Alabama Governor Andrew B. Moore sent Garrott to North Carolina as a commissioner to enlist his home state's aid in joining the secession movement.

== Civil War ==
When the Civil War began, Garrott formed the 20th Alabama Infantry Regiment, serving briefly as its lieutenant colonel) from September 16, 1861, to October 7, 1861, and thereafter as its colonel. The brigade was stationed in Mobile, Alabama during 1861 and 1862. Garrott's brigade was sent to Mississippi as part of General Edward D. Tracy's brigade. Garrott took part in the Battle of Port Gibson and the Battle of Champion's Hill. Garrott was killed by a Union sharpshooter on June 17, 1863, shortly before being promoted to brigadier general. His commission to rank from May 28, 1863, was received at headquarters after his death. Because of his death, his posthumous appointment was not confirmed by the Confederate Senate.

According to Warner's footnote, Garrott was buried under the window of a friend's {Finney} house in Vicksburg and remains never moved {letter from Garrott's wife}. What happened to Garrott was the following: A Confederate undertaker's list/map of CS burials in Vicksburg was lost-although partially found years later. This list reported a "Colonel Garnet" of the 20th Alabama-although gravesite plot unknown. Apparently, Garrott was reburied in Vicksburg's Cedar Hill/Confederate Cemetery; however due to the misspelling of his surname and incorrect rank-his Generals commission was received after his death-apparently lead to reporting that his remains were not moved from his first burial place. Thus the NPS listing for Garrott now has his correct rank/surname but no grave number. A stone cenotaph marker for him stands in Soldiers Rest Confederate Cemetery, ironically located in the Cedar Hill (Old Vicksburg City) Cemetery.

== Legacy ==
Fort Garrott near Vicksburg was named for him. The fort did not fall to the Union Army in battle because the planned final assault on Confederate positions scheduled for July 6, 1863 was avoided due to Lieutenant General John C. Pemberton's surrender of his army to Major General Ulysses S. Grant on July 4, 1863. Sons Of Confederate Veterans Camp 764 Marion, Alabama Named In His Honor.

== See also ==
- List of American Civil War generals (Acting Confederate)
