= Tad Campbell =

American politician

Tad Campbell (born May 10, 1970) is a state legislator in Mississippi. He received his associate's degree from Meridian Community College, his bachelor's degree from the University of Southern Mississippi, and his JD from Mississippi College School of Law. He is a Republican who served in the Mississippi House of Representatives from 2008 to 2012. He lived in Meridian, Mississippi in 2011.
