= Lucy C. Turnbull =

American classical scholar (1931–2019)

- Lucy C. Turnbull, from a 1963 newspaper.
- Born: May 26, 1931; Lancaster, Ohio
- Died: April 21, 2019; Oxford, Mississippi
- Occupation(s): Classics scholar, college professor, museum director
- Years active: 1961–1990

Lucy Curtis Turnbull (May 26, 1931 – April 21, 2019) was an American classics scholar, and director of the University of Mississippi Museums from 1983 to 1990.

== Early life ==
Lucy Curtis Turnbull was born in Lancaster, Ohio, the daughter of Donald Turnbull and Lucy Taylor Turnbull. She earned a bachelor's degree at Bryn Mawr College in 1952 and both master's (1954) and doctoral degrees from Radcliffe College. She focused her doctoral research on geometric bronzes in Greece, at the American School of Classical Studies in Athens.

== Career ==
As a young woman, Turnbull worked at Wellesley College as a museum assistant and art librarian. She also worked as an assistant at the Museum of Fine Arts in Boston. She joined the faculty of the University of Mississippi in 1961, as a classics professor. She was among the professors who spoke in favour of racial integration at Ole Miss in 1962, when James Meredith enrolled at the school. From 1983 to 1990, she was director of the university's museums. In addition to the museum's collection of Greek and Roman objects, she oversaw exhibits of the museum's diverse holdings, including materials related to Mississippi author William Faulkner, and the art of Mississippi painter Theora Hamblett.

Turnbull retired in 1990. She spoke to community groups about archaeology, and was a longtime Bible study teacher at a nearby Episcopalian church.

== Personal life ==
Turnbull died in Oxford, Mississippi, in 2019, aged 87 years.
