= Torrey Quilt Collection =

Collection of African-American quilts

The Ella King Torrey Collection of African American Quilts and other Recent Quilt Acquisitions is a collection of African-American quilts that were procured from 1980 to 1983 by Ella King Torrey during her fieldwork with art historian Maude Southwell Wahlman.

The collection of 13 quilts includes a hand quilt by Mississippi quilter Sarah Mary Taylor that was made for the 1985 film The Color Purple, as well as an appliquéd word quilt of hers. Two of the collection's quilts are by Taylor's mother, Pearlie Posey (1894–1984). The collection also includes the "Log Cabin" quilt by Georgia quilter Arester Earl, which Ella King Torrey exhibited in her dining room.

== See also ==
- Quilts of Gee's Bend
