= WKZB =

WKZB may refer to:

- WKZB (FM), a radio station (97.9 FM) licensed to Newton, Mississippi, United States
- WJXM (FM), a radio station (95.1 FM) licensed to Marion, Mississippi, United States, known as WKZB from 2011 to 2016
- WEXR, a radio station (106.9 FM) licensed to Stonewall, Mississippi, United States, known as WKZB from 2005 to 2011
- WCLR (FM), a radio station (93.5 FM) licensed to Butler, Alabama, United States, known as WKZB from 1997 to 2005
