= Peace Monument (Decatur, Indiana) =

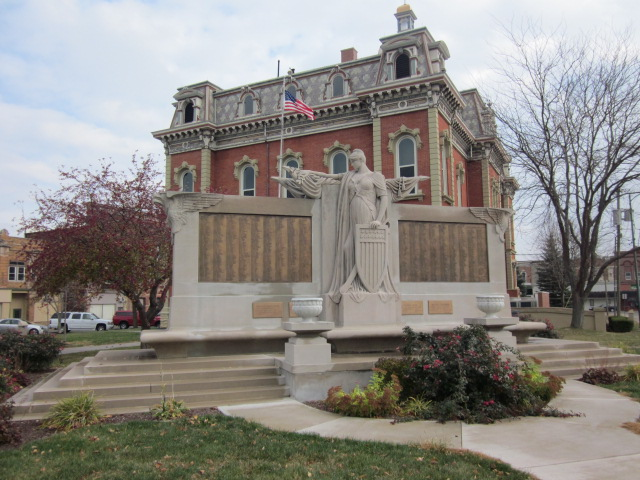
- Artist: Charles Mulligan
- Year: 1912–1913
- Type: Indiana limestone
- Dimensions: 490 cm × 880 cm × 262 cm (192 in × 348 in × 103.2 in)
- Location: Adams County Courthouse; Decatur, Indiana, United States; 40°49′46.32″N 84°55′29.81″W
- Owner: Adams County Commissioners

Peace Monument is a cenotaph designed by Charles Mulligan. It is located at the Adams County Courthouse in Decatur, Indiana, in the United States. It is a war memorial devoted to peace, active women in the American Civil War and as a general war memorial commemorating the sacrifice of soldiers in war. It is the first monument in the United States specifically devoted to peace.

== Description ==
Peace Monument is made of Indiana limestone and metal. The front of the piece has an allegory of Peace, represented as a woman. She stands to the proper left and wears armor. Her hair is styled in a bun. In her proper left hand she wields a shield representing the United States which she holds in front of herself, and it sits on the ground in front of her feet. Her right arm is outstretched in front of her. It sits upon a laurel twig. The twig sits upon four furled flags which lay across the top of the cenotaph, centered. She has a sword, which rests in a scabbard, strapped to her proper left side, just behind the shield.

Bronze panels on either side of Peace include the names of 1,276 veterans from Adams County. The back of the cenotaph has the words inscribed:

TO THE GLORY OF OUR COUNTRY
AND IN LOVING MEMORY OF
OUR SOLDIER HEROS
TO THE WOMEN OF OUR NATION
AS A TRIBUTE TO THEIR
COURAGE DEVOTION AND SACRIFICE

The back of the cenotaph has a relief depicting a nurse treating a wounded soldier. The cenotaph used to house a fountain which poured into a trough just beneath the relief. Near the relief, is a metal tablet that is installed on the cenotaph. The metal was taken from USS Maine. Inscribed on the plaque are the words "IN MEMORIAM/U.S.S. MAINE". The plaque was unearthed in 2008, during a restoration project by the county. There is a bench at the cenotaph base. Two urns are placed in front of the cenotaph, for plantings, and sit in front of Peace.

== Acquisition ==
The development for the sculpture was started by the historian French Quinn. He headed up the placing of flowers on veterans graves during Decoration Day. Quinn wrote an editorial in the Decatur Daily Democrat called "Let's Build a Soldiers Monument" and demanded that funds be raised to build a war memorial. The result was a property tax program, supported by the Grand Army of the Republic, that helped raise the funds. The tax was 7 cents for every $100 paid. The piece was created between 1912 and 1913 and installation began in July 1913. Development of the piece was led by Sam Henry Post from the Grand Army of the Republic and John H. Heller. The county contributed $10,000 for the piece to be created. Delays in the finalization of the work pushed the dedication back by two weeks. It was dedicated on October 30, 1913. State Governor Samuel M. Ralston attended the ceremony.

== Information ==
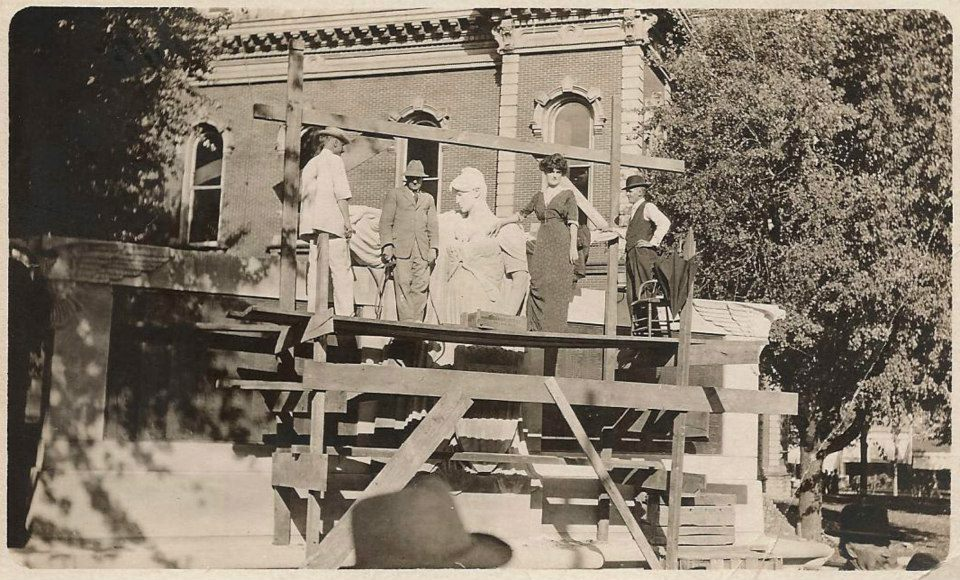
Margaret McMasters Van Slyke with the Peace Monument circa 1913

The idea for the monument was first brought to the Art Institute of Chicago, which suggested that Quinn and the city talk to Charles Mulligan. Mulligan became the sculptor for the piece. It was carved by Charles Dodd. George Wemhoff of Wemhoff Monument Works engineered and his company fabricated and installed it. The cenotaph is a general war memorial, with a special focus on the importance of peace and the role of women in the American Civil War. Specifically, it memorializes the Civil War, the Mexican–American War, the Spanish–American War and the American Revolution. The quarry used to supply the Indiana limestone was the same that supplied the Soldiers' and Sailors' Monument in Indianapolis, Indiana.

In 2013, the county celebrated the 100th anniversary of Peace Monument. A re-dedication ceremony was held at the site.

=== Margaret McMasters Van Slyke ===
The model for Peace, was Margaret McMasters Van Slyke, who was from Chicago, Illinois. Around 1904, Van Slyke was named the "best and most perfectly formed woman" by Bernarr Macfadden. She was described as having a "fascinating type of beauty so often spoken of as Grecian".

== Condition ==
The sculpture went through conservation and was cleaned and coated with sealant in 1991 by JRS Builders. It was surveyed by the Save Outdoor Sculpture! program in 1993. It was described, in August that year, as needing treatment. In the late 1990s, portions of the cenotaph were repaired. In 2008, bronze plaques were resealed. During the 2013 centennial celebration, the county aimed to raise $40,000 to restore the monument. Funds would also support the inscription of veterans from the county who served after 1913.
