= Ken Marlow =

American realist painter (born 1960)

Ken Marlow (1960–22 October 2023) was an American realist painter known for his precisionist still life paintings and portraiture. He was born in the U.S. state of Texas and raised in an Air Force family in Mississippi, Dayton, Ohio, and Washington D.C. He studied painting with artists Danni Dawson and the late world renowned portraitist, Nelson Shanks and received a BA degree in art history from Yale University. Marlow's work is included in the Mississippi Museum of Art.

In 1985 Marlow was the recipient of American Artist Magazine's Grand Prize Award. Marlow cites Shanks as well as Burton Silverman, Jean-Simeon Chardin, Jan van Huysum, Giorgio Morandi and sculptor Bruno Lucchesi as influences. In 1986 Marlow was the recipient of the award in art from the Mississippi Institute of Art and Letters. In his lifetime, Marlow had several solo exhibitions at the Hollis Taggart Galleries at both their New York City and Washington D.C. exhibition spaces as well as the Jane Haslem Gallery. In 2013 the painter suffered a stroke. A Go Fund Me page was set up to raise money to enable him to employ therapy to in order for him to paint proficiently once again. Marlow died 22 October 2023, in Alexandria, Virginia, at age 63.
