= Ethel Wright Mohamed =

American artist (1906–1992)

- Born: Ethel Lee Wright; October 13, 1906; Webster County, Mississippi, US
- Died: February 15, 1992 (aged 85)
- Known for: Embroidery
- Movement: Folk art
- Spouse: Hassan Mohamed (m. 1924)

Ethel Wright Mohamed (October 13, 1906 – February 15, 1992) was an American artist, best known for her embroidered scenes of country life. She is sometimes compared to "Grandma Moses," both for her folk art style of illustration and her late start as an artist.

== Early life ==
Ethel Lee Wright was born on a farm in Webster County, Mississippi, the eldest child of Elijah Wright and Nina Bell Ramsay Wright. She learned to embroider as a child, from her mother. As a teenager, she worked at a bakery in Shaw, Mississippi.

== Career ==
Ethel Wright Mohamed returned to embroidery after she was widowed in 1965. "There is just a soothing music as the needle comes through the cloth," she told the Tuscaloosa News in 1992. She embroidered elaborate scenes based on her own memories and family life. Her colorful works found a local audience through family members, and soon they were exhibited in regional museums as folk art. In 1974, her embroidered art was part of the Smithsonian Institution's Festival of American Folklife in Washington D.C. The next year, the Smithsonian commissioned a tapestry by Mohamed, for the Bicentennial Festival of American Folklife. From 1976 to 1977, twelve works by Mohamed were displayed at the Renwick Gallery. She embroidered a picture of the Renwick event, which is now in the Smithsonian American Art Museum.

"Me at the Renwick", by Ethel Mohamed, 1978 Smithsonian American Art Museum

In 1977, director William R. Ferris featured Mohamed in the documentary film "Four Women Artists," produced by the Center for Southern Folklore, as one of the four Mississippi women in the title, along with writer Eudora Welty, quilter Pecolia Warner, and painter Theora Hamblett.

Mohamed donated original works to charities and museums, including the American Heart Association and the University of Mississippi Medical Center. She was honored with a Mississippi Governor's Lifetime Achievement Award for Excellence in the Arts in 1991.

== Personal life and legacy ==
Ethel Wright married Lebanese-born salesman Hassan Mohamed in 1924. They had eight children, the oldest of whom was Ollie Mohamed, who would later become a Mississippi state senator. The family lived most of their lives in Belzoni, Mississippi, where they operated the H. Mohamed Store. Ethel ran the store after Hassan's passing and until 1980, when a grandson took over. She died in 1992 at age 85.

== Legacy ==
The Ethel Wright Mohamed Stitchery Museum is open to the public in Mohamed's former home, with her youngest daughter Carol Mohamed Ivy as curator. In 2007, a show of Mohamed's work was mounted at the Lauren Rogers Museum of Art in Laurel, Mississippi.
