= Lucinda Toomer =

American quilter (1888–1983)

Lucinda Toomer (February 5, 1888 – September 1, 1983) was an American artist who worked in the African-American tradition of quiltmaking. Her quilts are known for their bold compositions, visual rhythm, and improvisational style. They were at the forefront of a surge of national recognition for the art form during the 1990s.

== Early life ==
Lucinda Toomer was born Lucinda Hodrick in Stewart County, Georgia. She was the oldest of seven children born to Orange and Sophie Stokes Hodrick, who made their living as cotton and peanut farmers. She married Jim Toomer in 1908, and moved with him to a farm near Dawson, Georgia.

== Quiltmaking ==
Toomer began quilting at the age of 12, under her mother's tutelage. The craft was practiced out of necessity, in a spirit of economy and reuse, but Toomer also found lifelong artistic expression in quilting. She worked on her quilts almost every day, completing around 20 each year, and had a routine of sorting and cutting pieces in the morning and quilting them together at night. To piece together quilt tops, she used scraps from her own sewing as well as fabric purchased in bulk from nearby textile factories.

Toomer's designs were often inspired by traditional quilt patterns, like the ones handed down from her mother, as well as patterns she found in books and magazines. Using an improvisational approach to piecing, she adapted these familiar patterns into boldly expressive and individual creations. Characteristic formal elements in her quilts include the use of multiple patterning, asymmetrical compositions, and pattern repetition featuring variations on a theme.

Long strips of fabric play a major aesthetic role in her quilts, serving as an organizing and unifying element within the overall composition. This use of strips to create a geometric pattern has a long lineage traceable to West African textile patterns and narrow strip weaving.

Toomer also used contrasting colors to create vivid and highly visible patterns. Red was one of her favorite colors to use in this way. She often designed unusual, mismatched quilt borders, and her piecing exhibits a freedom of shape unrestricted by straight lines or right angles. The combination of these design gestures works to create a lively and high varied textile surface that still maintains compositional wholeness.

== Legacy ==
Toomer's quiltmaking came to national attention when she was featured alongside other quilters, including Martha Jane Pettway and Sarah Mary Taylor, in the 1983 traveling exhibition "Ten Afro-American Quiltmakers," curated by Dr. Maude Southwell Wahlman.

Her quilts are held in multiple museum collections, including the Museum of International Folk Art in Santa Fe, New Mexico. Two of her quilts are in the collection of the American Folk Art Museum in New York. One of these, Diamond Strip Quilt (purchased in 1990) was the first piece acquired for the museum's quilt collection.

Lucinda Toomer received a 1983 National Heritage Fellowship from the National Endowment for the Arts.
