= 43rd Mississippi Infantry Regiment =

- Mississippi state flag, 1861-1894
- Active: August 1862 to April 1865
- Country: Confederate States of America
- Allegiance: Mississippi
- Branch: Confederate States Army
- Type: Infantry
- Equipment: M1841 Mississippi Rifle; Altered "George Law" Musket; Pattern 1853 Enfield; Springfield Rifle
- Engagements: American Civil War: Battle of Iuka; Second Battle of Corinth; Battle of Chickasaw Bayou; Siege of Vicksburg; Battle of Chickamauga; Battle of Okolona; Battle of Resaca; Battle of New Hope Church; Battle of Kennesaw Mountain; Battle of Atlanta; Battle of Ezra Church; Battle of Decatur; Battle of Nashville; Battle of Kinston; Battle of Bentonville

Commanders
- Notable commanders: Col. William Hudson Moore †; Col. Richard Harrison; Lt. Col. Columbus Sykes; Lt. Col. James O. Banks

The 43rd Mississippi Infantry Regiment was a regiment of infantry in the Confederate States Army. It fought in many battles and campaigns of the American Civil War. It was known as "The Camel Regiment" after its mascot, Douglas the Camel.

== Service history ==
Organized in the summer of 1862 and serving in the Army of the West of Gen. Sterling Price, the first battle that the 43rd fought was at Iuka. At the Battle of Second Corinth, Colonel William Hudson Moore and Lieutenant Colonel Richard W. Leigh were killed by Union forces. After the battle, Richard Harrison was promoted to Colonel and Columbus "Lum" Sykes promoted to Lieutenant Colonel.

Their next battles were during Union Gen. Ulysses S. Grant's Vicksburg Campaign between April and July 1863. At the Siege of Vicksburg a mine blew up which killed six members from the 43rd. The regiment was part of General Hebert's brigade defending the Third Louisiana Redan. The regiment's namesake camel, Douglas, was killed by Union sharpshooters on June 27, 1863, at Vicksburg, and the regiment was captured along with the rest of the Confederate defenders when the city fell to Union forces on July 4.

In September 1863, a detachment from Company H of the 43rd Regiment which had not been captured at Vicksburg was organized as Captain Merriman Pound's 9th Battalion Mississippi Sharpshooters and sent to join Braxton Bragg's Army of the Tennessee in Georgia, fighting at the Battle of Chickamauga.

After Chickamauga, Pound's Battalion was sent back to Mississippi and some of the 43rd rode with General Forrest to drive Union forces out of the state. In the spring of 1864, the 43rd regiment was sent to Georgia to fight in the Atlanta campaign against William T. Sherman's invading Federal army. In Cobb County, Georgia, the regiment hauled cannons up the side of Kennesaw Mountain.

After Atlanta was lost, the 43rd fought in General John Bell Hood's Tennessee Campaign which included the Battles of Franklin and Nashville. Afterwards it was sent to the Carolinas and fought at the Battles of Kinston and Bentonville, North Carolina.

The 43rd Mississippi was part of Gen. Joseph E. Johnston's surrender of the Army of Tennessee at Bennett Place on April 26, 1865. The army was soon disbanded and the men of the 43rd walked back to their home state and rebuilt their communities.

== Commanders ==
Commanders of the 43rd Mississippi Infantry Regiment:

- Col. William H. Moore, killed at Corinth, 1862.
- Col. Richard Harrison
- Lt. Richard W. Leigh, killed at Corinth, 1862.
- Lt. Col. Columbus Sykes
- Lt. Col. James O. Banks

== Organization ==
Companies of the 43rd Mississippi Infantry Regiment:

- Company A – Frank Rodgers Rifles of Monroe County
- Company B – Lowndes Riflemen of Lowndes County
- Company C – Whitfield Guards of Monroe County
- Company D – Capt. Thompson's Company of Choctaw County
- Company E – Capt. Smith's Company of Pontotoc County
- Company F – Capt. Hampton's Company of Lowndes County
- Company G – Capt. Winter's Company of Monroe County
- Company H – Itawamba Tigers of Itawamba County
- Company I – Capt. Banks Company of Lowndes County.
- Company K – Kemper Fencibles of Kemper County.
- Company L – Gholson's Rebels of Monroe County.

== See also ==
- List of Mississippi Civil War Confederate units

== Works cited ==
- W. Scott Bell (2017). The Camel Regiment: A History of the Bloody 43rd Mississippi Volunteer Infantry 1862-65. Pelican Publishing Co. ISBN 9781455623075.
- Rowland, Dunbar; Howell, H. Grady Jr. (1988). Military history of Mississippi, 1803-1898. Spartanburg, S.C.: Reprint Co. ISBN 0871522667. OCLC 194626367.
