= Anding, Mississippi =

- Unincorporated community
- Location within Mississippi Location within the United States
- Coordinates: 32°41′31″N 90°26′02″W
- Country: United States
- State: Mississippi
- County: Yazoo
- Elevation: 282 ft (86 m)
- Time zone: UTC-6 (Central (CST))
  - Summer (DST): UTC-5 (CDT)
- ZIP code: 39040
- Area code: 662
- GNIS feature ID: 690981

Anding is an unincorporated community located in Yazoo County, Mississippi. Anding is approximately 2 miles (3.2 km) east of Oil City and approximately 5 miles (8.0 km) north of Bentonia. It is the birthplace of quiltmaker Sarah Mary Taylor.

Anding has a zip code of 39040.

== Transportation ==
Amtrak’s City of New Orleans, which operates between New Orleans and Chicago, passes through the town on CN tracks, but makes no stop. The nearest station is located in Yazoo City, 13 miles (21 km) to the north.

== Education ==
Residents are a part of the Yazoo County School District, and are zoned to Yazoo County Middle School and Yazoo County High School.
