= Theora Hamblett =

American painter (1895–1977)

- Born: January 15, 1895; Paris, Mississippi, U.S.
- Died: March 6, 1977 (aged 82); Englewood, New Jersey, U.S.
- Known for: folk art

Theora Hamblett (January 15, 1895 – March 6, 1977) was an American painter, one of the first Mississippi folk artists to achieve national prominence. Hamblett's paintings can be divided into three categories: memory paintings, dream paintings, and landscape paintings.

== Early life ==
Theora Alton Hamblett was born 15 January 1895, in Paris, Mississippi. Her father Samuel was a Civil War veteran, who was 72 years old when Theora was born. She was educated at Lafayette County Agricultural High School and at Blue Mountain College. Hamblett was raised in a very religious household and rotated between Methodist and Baptist churches.

Theora Hamblett became interested in painting at a young age, though she did not start taking painting classes until later in her life at age fifty-five. Carol Crown states that when Hamblett was eight years old, she was given crayons as a present which could have stimulated her interest in painting.

Hamblett was a teacher in her early adulthood; she left the classroom in 1931, and cared for her dying mother for several years. In 1939 she bought a house in Oxford, Mississippi, where she lived and rented rooms to students. In her mid-fifties, she took her first nighttime painting class at the University of Mississippi. She also took correspondence courses on art.

== Symbolism ==
Hamblett uses many symbols in her artwork. Hamblett's paintings are colorful and frequently harken back to her childhood on a farm, or depict stories from the Bible. Some represent Hamblett's dreams or visions, frequently with religious symbolism (angels, chariots, butterflies, stairways, roses). Butterflies in Hamblett's paintings represent resurrection and the soul. A rose in Hamblett's art symbolizes love, martyrdom, or The Virgin Mary. The color yellow represents divinity or God in Hamblett's art. Silver symbolizes the death of the body in Hamblett's paintings. In 1954, Hamblett broke her hip in an accident and needed surgery. While she was in the hospital, Hamblett began to paint her visions. Many of her dreams were religious in nature. Hamblett did not sell many of these paintings because they were intimate and personal.

== Style and technique ==
Theora Hamblett's artwork is characterized by vibrant colors. She has a unique style of creating trees in her artwork which is easily recognizable by fans of her art. She had a specific method of layering colors in the individual leaves so that they shine with bright colors. She layered each single leaf on the art piece to make the trees the central focus of her paintings. Hamblett painted landscape scenes of all four seasons, but she was extremely fond of autumn because of the dazzling color of the fall leaves. Hamblett almost exclusively used oil paint on canvas. Carol Crown states that as an artist Hamblett "developed a unique pointillist technique that invested her paintings with a distinctive look."

== Personal life and legacy ==
Hamblett died 6 March 1977, age 82. Hundreds of her drawings and unsold paintings were left to the University of Mississippi Museum. The largest collection of Theora Hamblett's art is at The University of Mississippi Museum. Several of her paintings are also available for display in American embassies. Nelson A. Rockefeller and Sir Alec Guinness were other collectors who owned works by Hamblett. Football player Eli Manning is also said to own a painting by Theora Hamblett.

Their charm was recognized as early as 1954, when she sold a painting to a New York gallery owner, Betty Parsons. She was featured in a 1955 show of new acquisitions at the Museum of Modern Art. In the 1960s and 1970s, some of her paintings were used for UNICEF Christmas cards and calendars. In 1972 she was part of another show at the Museum of Modern Art, this time focusing on naive art.

In 1977, director William R. Ferris featured Hamblett in the documentary film "Four Women Artists," produced by the Center for Southern Folklore, as one of the four Mississippi women in the title, along with writer Eudora Welty, quilter Pecolia Warner, and embroiderer Ethel Wright Mohamed.

In the 1980s, folk art scholar and then-art historian student Ella King Torrey wrote her graduate thesis on Hamblett.

There is a historic marker at the site of Hamblett's house in Oxford. The house was also depicted in a keepsake ornament produced in 2009 for the University of Mississippi. Efforts are currently underway to erect a historical marker near her gravesite in Paris, Mississippi.
