= Charles Mulligan =

American sculptor

Charles J. Mulligan
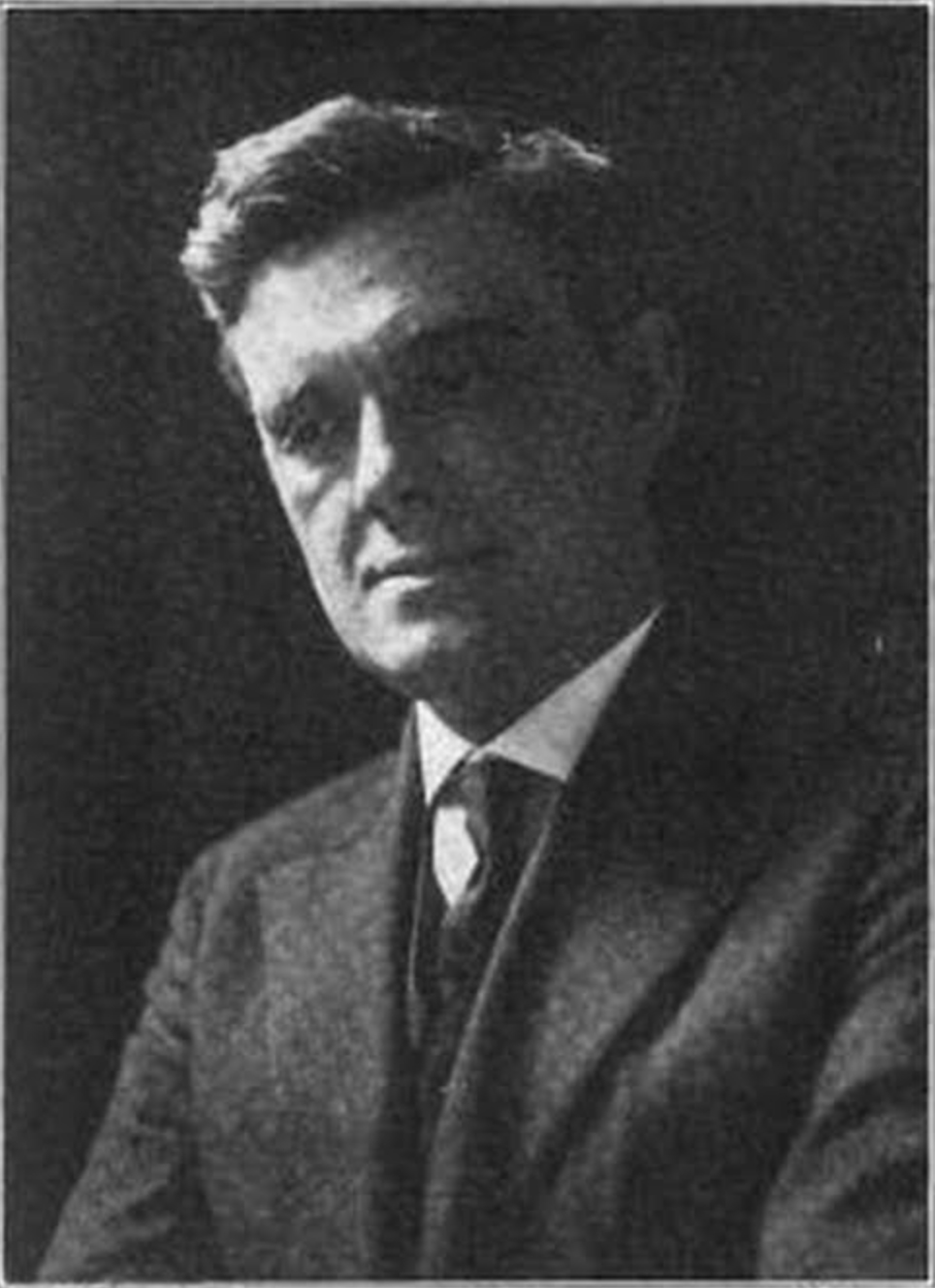
- Born: September 28, 1866; Ireland
- Died: March 25, 1916 (aged 49); Chicago, Illinois
- Resting place: Mount Greenwood Cemetery, Chicago
- Education: School of the Art Institute of Chicago
- Known for: Stone sculpture
- Movement: City Beautiful movement
- Spouse: Margaret "Maggie" Ely

Charles J. Mulligan (September 28, 1866 – March 25, 1916) was an American sculptor. Born in Riversdale, Aughnacloy, County Tyrone, Ireland, Mulligan immigrated to America at the age of 17 and found work as a stone cutter in Pullman, Illinois, near Chicago.

He studied at the School of the Art Institute of Chicago with Lorado Taft, who was also working as an assistant at the time. During the Columbian Exposition in 1893, Taft made Mulligan the foreman of the workshop producing a large amount of sculpture for the exhibition. He later studied at the École Nationale Supérieure des Beaux-Arts in Paris with Alexandre Falguière.

Mulligan was the head of the sculptor department at the School of the Art Institute of Chicago and was closely identified with the Chicago Beautiful movement. He participated as a judge in many events around the Chicago area, including beauty contests and sculptor competitions. Throughout his life, he chaired multiple committees and councils in Chicago with the aim of beautifying the city with affordable works of art. While most of his career was dedicated to classical sculpture and city beautification projects, he also had a fondness for folk art and often lent his expertise to local artists. Mulligan administrated an artists' colony in Bass Lake, Indiana that worked to host local artists that needed a place to work. During his time at Bass Lake, Mulligan would work in a number of folk mediums, including local flora.

Mulligan died on March 25, 1916, in Chicago. He died at St. Luke's Hospital accompanied by his wife and three children. At the time of his death, he had just been awarded a commission to build his design of a statue of Mad Anthony Wayne in Fort Wayne, Indiana.

He was buried at Mount Greenwood Cemetery.

== Selected works ==
- Peace Monument, Decatur, Indiana, 1913
- Illinois Memorial, Vicksburg National Military Park, 1906
- The Coal Miner, 1904 World's Fair
- John H. Hamline, Hamline Elementary, Chicago, 1909
- Lincoln, Grant and Richard Yates, at the Illinois Memorial Temple, Vicksburg National Cemetery
- Lincoln the Rail Splitter, Garfield Park, Chicago, 1911
- Lincoln the Orator, Rosamond, Illinois
- Statue of William McKinley (Chicago), 1905
- Thomas Francis Meagher, Montana State Capitol, 1905
- George Rogers Clark Memorial in Riverwood Park, Quincy, 1909
- Miner and Child, Humboldt Park, Chicago, 1901
- Independence Square Fountain, Chicago, 1902
- Anthony Wayne, Hayden Park in Fort Wayne, Indiana 1918
- Statue of Colonel Finnerty
- Bust of Governor John R. Tanner, Tanner Mausoleum, Oak Ridge Cemetery, Springfield, Illinois
- Illinois Supreme Court Building, entrance sculpture groupings 'Law and Knowledge' and 'Justice and Power'
- Henry Clay statue in Lexington, Kentucky
