= James Collier (politician) =

American politician (1872–1933)

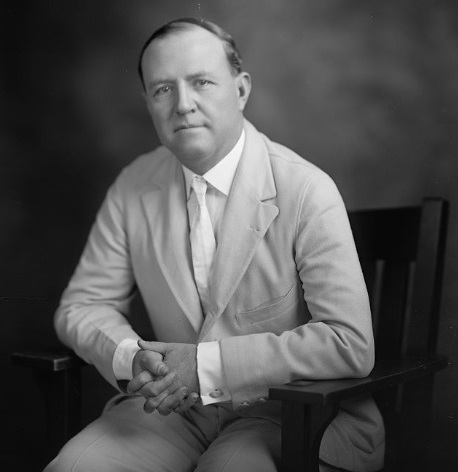
- Harris & Ewing photograph, c. 1925

Member of the U.S. House of Representatives from Mississippi's 8th district
- In office March 4, 1909 – March 3, 1933
- Preceded by: John Sharp Williams
- Succeeded by: District inactive

Member of the Mississippi House of Representatives
- In office 1896–1899

Personal details
- Born: James William Collier; September 28, 1872 near Vicksburg, Mississippi, U.S.
- Died: September 28, 1933 (aged 61) Washington, D.C., U.S.
- Resting place: Cedar Hill Cemetery, Vicksburg, Mississippi, U.S.
- Party: Democratic
- Education: University of Mississippi
- Occupation: Politician, lawyer

James William Collier (September 28, 1872 – September 28, 1933) was a politician from the U.S. state of Mississippi.

Born on the Glenwood Plantation near Vicksburg in 1872, he graduated from the University of Mississippi at Oxford in 1894 with a degree in law. Later that year, he was admitted to the Bar association and commenced practice in Vicksburg.

Collier's political career began in 1896, when he was elected to the Mississippi House of Representatives. He remained in that position until 1899. From 1900 to 1909, he served as Warren County's circuit clerk.

Running successfully as the Democratic Party candidate in the state's eighth congressional district, he took office on March 4, 1909, and went on to serve in eleven congresses (61st-72nd).

Collier chaired the United States House Committee on Ways and Means during the 72nd Congress (1930–1932). He decided not to run for a twelfth term due to controversy over whether candidates should run at-large or by districts.

President Franklin D. Roosevelt appointed him to the United States Tariff Commission. He served in that position from March 28, 1933 until his death on September 28, 1933, his 61st birthday.

He is buried at Cedar Hill Cemetery in Vicksburg.

U.S. House of Representatives
Preceded by John S. Williams	Member of the U.S. House of Representatives from Mississippi's 8th congressional district 1909-1933	Succeeded by District inactive
