= Caroline Russell Compton =

American painter

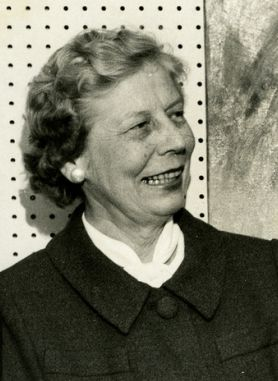
- Caroline Compton in 1963
- Born: January 10, 1907; Vicksburg, Warren County, Mississippi
- Died: August 1, 1987 (aged 80); Vicksburg, Mississippi
- Occupation: artist

Caroline Russell Compton (January 10, 1907 − August 1, 1987) was a noted Mississippi artist. Her paintings are part of the permanent collection in the Mississippi Museum of Art.

== Biography ==
Caroline Compton was born in Vicksburg, Mississippi, to Thomas Wilbur Compton and Kate Russell Compton. She had two older sisters – Catherine (born 1901) and Mary (born 1902); an older brother – Thomas (born 1904); and a younger brother – Joseph (born 1908).

=== Education and career ===
Caroline Compton attended high school at All Saints' Junior College in Vicksburg and began her career as an artist after graduating from Sweet Briar College. From 1927 to 1929, she attended New York's Grand Central School of Art.

In the 1930s, as part of the Federal Art Project, Caroline Compton traveled the state of Mississippi as an art teacher in public schools and served as state director of the WPA's Mississippi Art Project from 1939 to 1940.

In 1961, Compton organized the Vicksburg Art Association and opened Vicksburg's Firehouse Gallery in 1971. In her paintings, Compton used the mediums of graphite, watercolor, oils, and woodblocks to capture people, landscapes, houses, public buildings, and riverfront settings in her hometown of Vicksburg.

=== Death ===
Caroline Compton died August 1, 1987, and was interred at Cedar Hill Cemetery in Vicksburg, Mississippi.
