= Cedar Hill Cemetery (Vicksburg, Mississippi) =

City cemetery in Warren County

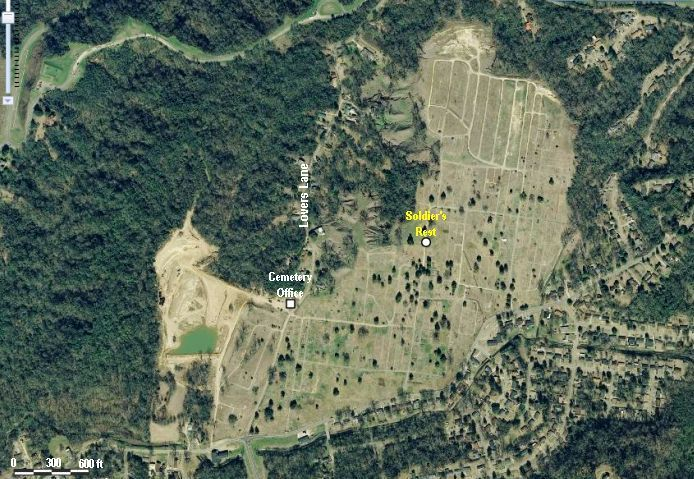
- Aerial view of Cedar Hill Cemetery
- Interactive map of Cedar Hill Cemetery

Details
- Location: 326 Lovers Lane, Vicksburg, Mississippi
- Country: United States
- Coordinates: 32.3658°N 90.8596°W
- Owned by: City of Vicksburg
- No. of graves: >30,000 (2021)
- Website: http://web.vicksburg.org/departments/cemetery
- Find a Grave: Cedar Hill Cemetery
- The Political Graveyard: Cedar Hill Cemetery

Cedar Hill Cemetery, also known as the City of Vicksburg Cemetery and Soldiers Rest Cemetery, is one of the "...oldest and largest cemeteries in the United States that is still in use". Establishment of Cedar Hill Cemetery predates the American Civil War.

== Soldiers' Rest burial site ==
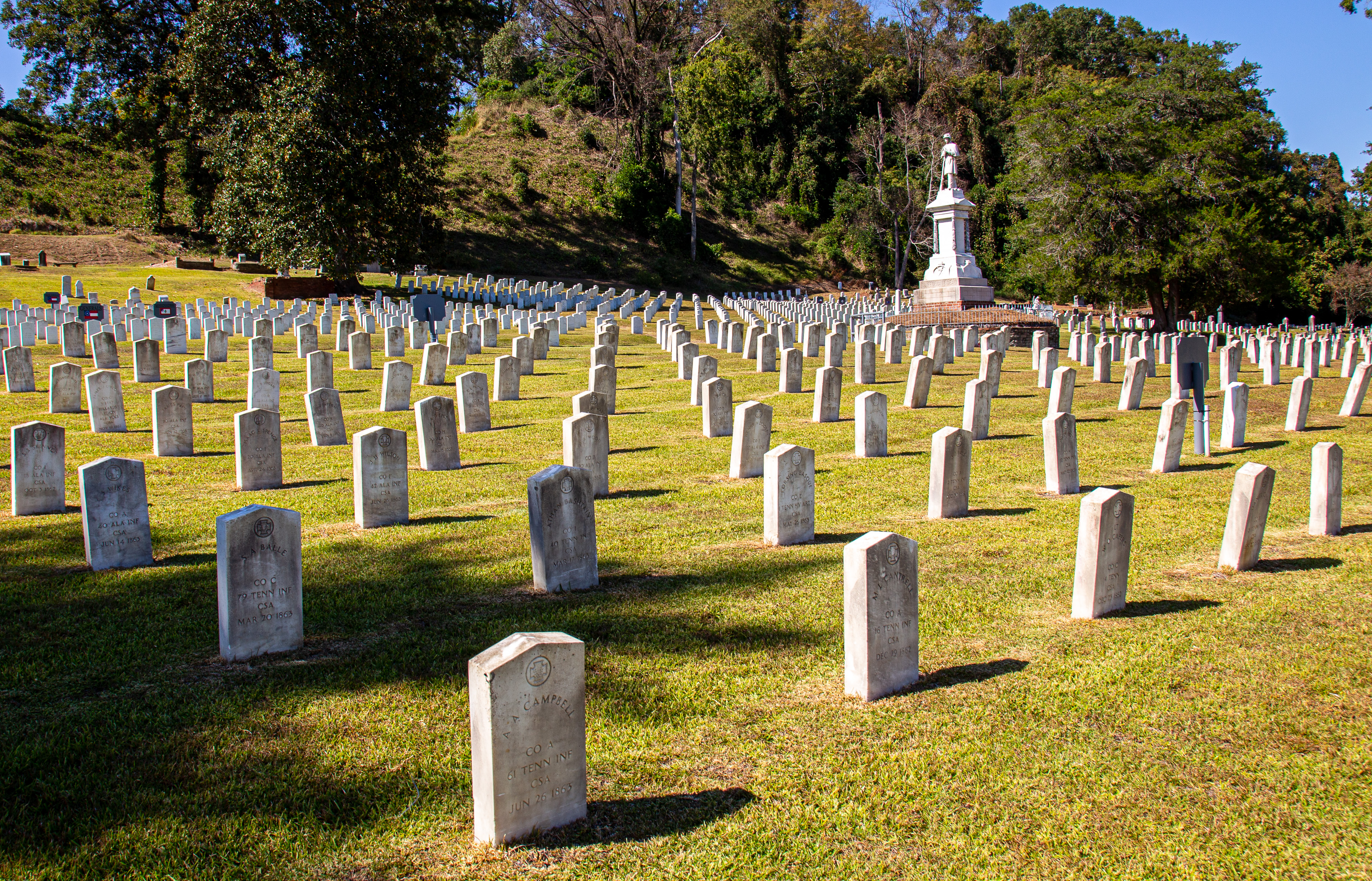
Soldiers' Rest within Cedar Hill Cemetery

After the American Civil War, a portion of Cedar Hill Cemetery was set aside for the burial of Confederate soldiers who died of sickness or wounds. This burial site was designated Soldiers' Rest and contains the graves of some 5,000 Confederate soldiers, with 1,600 identified.

== Notable interments ==
- John Stevens Bowen (1830–1863), Confederate major general during the American Civil War.
- Walker Brooke (1813–1869), U.S. Senator from Mississippi (1852–53).
- Beverly Francis Carradine (1848–1931), noted author and Methodist minister.
- Thomas C. Catchings (1847–1927), U.S. Representative from Mississippi (1885–1901).
- Nicholas Daniel Coleman (1800–1874), U.S. Representative from Kentucky (1829–31).
- James William Collier (1872–1933), U.S. Representative from Mississippi (1909–33).
- Caroline Russell Compton (1907–1987), noted Mississippi artist.
- Douglas the camel was a domesticated camel used by the Confederate Army during the American Civil War.
- Isham Warren Garrott (1816–1863), Confederate brigadier general during the American Civil War.
- Martin Edward Green (1815–1863), Confederate brigadier general during the American Civil War.
- Patrick Stevens Henry (1861–1933), U.S. Representative from Mississippi (1901–03).
- Elza Jeffords (1826–1885), U.S. Representative from Mississippi (1883–85).
- William Augustus Lake (1808–1861), U.S. Representative from Mississippi (1855–57).
- Alexander Keith McClung (1811–1855), lieutenant colonel in 1st Mississippi Regiment during the Mexican–American War, and U.S. chargé d'affaires to Bolivia (1849–51).
- Buddie Newman (1921–2002), Speaker of the Mississippi House of Representatives
- Lucille Spann (1938–1984), Chicago blues singer

== See also ==
- Vicksburg National Military Park
