= Ella King Russell Torrey =

American human rights activist (1925–2020)

- Born: Ella King Russell; August 7, 1925; Philadelphia, Pennsylvania, U.S.
- Died: April 14, 2020 (aged 94); Philadelphia, Pennsylvania, U.S.
- Education: Bennington College, (BA); University of Pennsylvania
- Occupation(s): Public Information Officer, UN; Editor, Chicago Tribune; Executive Director, International Visitors Council of Philadelphia; Activist
- Children: 4, including Ella King Torrey

Ella King Russell Torrey (August 7, 1925 – April 14, 2020) was an American public information officer for Eleanor Roosevelt, a human rights activist, and a recipient of the United Nations Human Rights Hero Award.

== Early life and education ==
Ella King Russell was born in Philadelphia, Pennsylvania to Norman F.S. and Ella D. Russell. The family lived in Edgewater Park, New Jersey. Russell attended Agnes Irwin School in Bryn Mawr, Pennsylvania. She was an aspiring dancer and auditioned for the Rockettes after graduation, but was not selected for the dance company.

Russell received a bachelor's degree in English from Bennington College in 1947. She continued her studies at the University of Pennsylvania, but moved to Paris six weeks before receiving her master's degree.

== Career ==
Russell became fashion editor for the Chicago Tribune’s Paris bureau and then editor at the Paris bureau of Egyptian newspaper Al-Misri. She returned to the United States in 1949 and began her position as information officer at the United Nations where she wrote reports on meetings of the Security Council, General Assembly, and U.N. committees. While at the United Nations, Russell served as public information officer for Eleanor Roosevelt. She managed Roosevelt's correspondence, wrote speeches, and often served as her stand-in at meetings of the United Nations Human Rights Commission. Russell continued at the United Nations after Roosevelt's departure.

Russell married Carl G. Torrey in 1954. The couple lived in Cambridge, Massachusetts during Carl's time at Harvard Business School. They moved to Bethlehem, Pennsylvania where Ella became director of the local World Affairs Council. They relocated again to Evansville, Indiana when Carl accepted a job with Mead Pharmaceuticals. Carl helped to develop Enfamil baby formula during his time with Mead. The Torreys and their four children moved to the Chestnut Hill neighborhood of Philadelphia in 1970.

Torrey was executive director of the International Visitors Council of Philadelphia from 1977 to 1987. She retired at 62, but continued to volunteer locally.

She received the United Nations Human Rights Hero Award from the United States Mission to the United Nations in 2015.

== Death and legacy ==
Torrey died of complications from COVID-19 in Philadelphia on April 14, 2020, at age 94, during the COVID-19 pandemic in Philadelphia. It was later announced a memorial service would be held later at Cathedral Village, to commemorate Torrey.
