= Pecolia Warner =

American artist (1901–1983)

Pecolia Warner (March 9, 1901 – March 1983) was an American quiltmaker.

== Early life ==
Pecolia Leola Deborah Jackson was born in a log house near Bentonia, Mississippi, and raised in Yazoo City, the ninth of eleven children. She learned to make quilts from her mother Katie (a trained teacher) and other older women in her community. "It's a gift from God to be able to do this," she explained. "That's my gift, that's my talent. Making quilts, that's my calling."

== Career ==
Warner worked various jobs as a domestic servant in Chicago, Illinois and New Orleans, Louisiana before retiring home to Mississippi in 1968. She quilted in the evenings when she worked full-time.

Warner used color with personal meanings attached: red, for example, meant anger or violence to Warner, and she considered it a color to use carefully. Her compositions have been linked to West African art, and to the "improvisational aesthetic" of jazz.

In 1977, director William R. Ferris featured Warner in the documentary film "Four Women Artists," produced by the Center for Southern Folklore, as one of the four Mississippi women in the title, along with writer Eudora Welty, painter Theora Hamblett, and embroiderer Ethel Wright Mohamed. In 1983, she was honored with a Women's Caucus for Art Lifetime Achievement Award.

== Personal life and legacy ==
Warner was married five times, with Sam Warner as her last husband. Warner died in March 1983, age 82. Her quilts continue to be displayed in museums, usually in group shows about African-American folk art. Her niece Sarah Mary Taylor also made quilts that were favored by art collectors.

A song by Louisiana folksinger Kevin Gordon, titled "Pecolia's Star," is about Warner's quilts. Poet Sandra McPherson included a poem named "Holy Woman: Pecolia Warner" in her collection, The God of Indeterminacy: Poems.
