= Old Douglas =

Camel in the Confederate Army

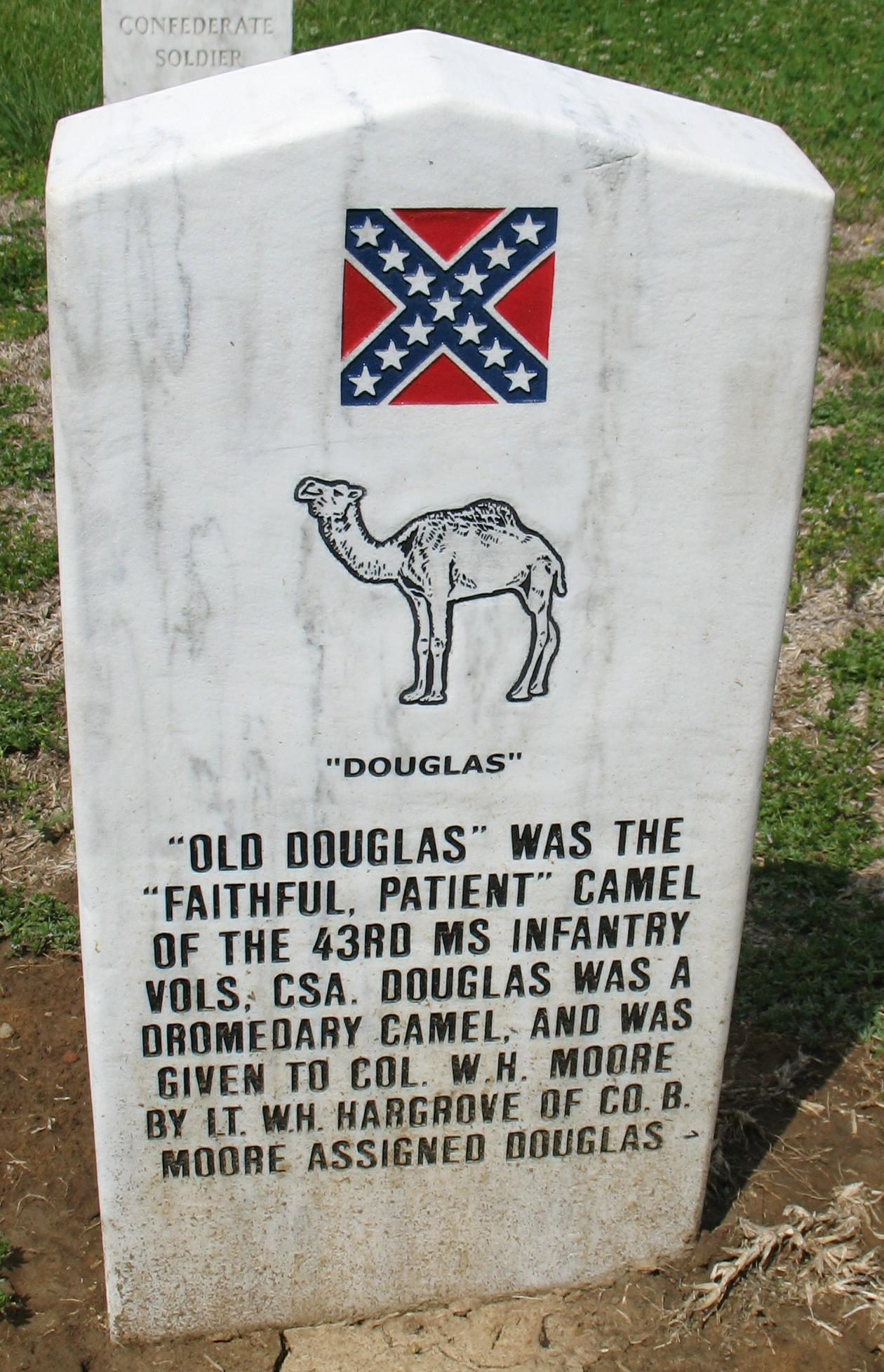
Marker for Douglas the camel in Cedar Hill Cemetery, Vicksburg, Mississippi

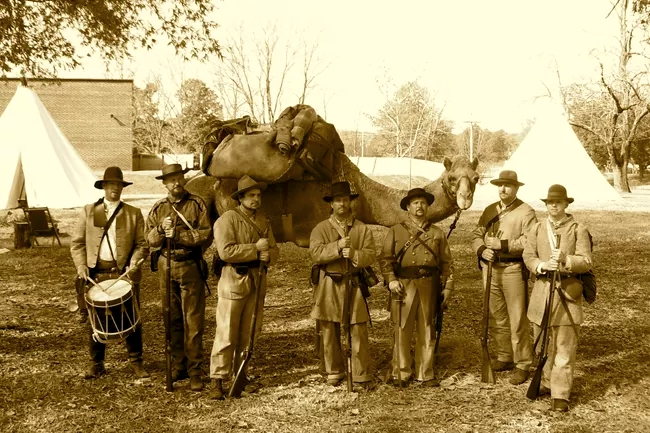
Old Douglas and Civil War reenactors of the 43rd Mississippi Infantry in 2016

Old Douglas was a domesticated camel used by Company A of the 43rd Mississippi Infantry, part of the Confederate Army during the American Civil War. Because of Old Douglas, the 43rd Mississippi Infantry came to be known as the Camel Regiment.

Douglas was not a veteran of the U.S. War Department program called the Texas Camel Experiment, which aimed to experiment with camels as a possible alternative to horses and mules, which were dying of dehydration in vast numbers. Jefferson Davis, who had ascended to the position of United States Secretary of War in 1853, was a strong proponent of the program, and used his political influence to make the experiment happen. During the same period as the Texas Camel Experiment, other camels were being privately imported into Mobile, Alabama. According to newspaper accounts in Alabama and Mississippi, planters sought to experiment with the camels for agriculture work. Old Douglas was purchased by William Hargrove and was initially given to Colonel W. H. Moore by 1st Lieutenant William Hargrove when he joined the 43rd Mississippi Infantry. Besides being a mascot, Moore assigned Douglas to the regimental band, carrying instruments and knapsacks.

== Active service ==
Though the men tried to treat Old Douglas like a horse, the camel was known to break free of any tether, and was eventually allowed to graze freely. Despite not being tied up, he never wandered far from the men. The Infantry's horses feared Old Douglas, and he is recorded to have spooked one horse into starting a stampede, which reportedly injured many, and possibly killed one or two horses.

Old Douglas's first active service was with General Sterling Price in the Iuka campaign. He also participated in the 1862 Battle of Corinth. He remained with the regiment until the Siege of Vicksburg, where he was killed by Union sharpshooters. Enraged at his death, the men swore to avenge him. Colonel Robert S. Bevier enlisted six of his best snipers, and successfully shot the culprit. Of Douglas's killer, Bevier reportedly said, "I refused to hear his name, and was rejoiced to learn that he had been severely wounded". Another commonly attributed theory is that Douglas was eaten during the Siege at Vicksburg by famished Confederate soldiers.

== Reception ==
Douglas is honored with his own grave marker in Cedar Hill Cemetery, in Vicksburg, Mississippi. He is, along with other camels used during the war, not overlooked by historians, nor by Civil War reenactors. There is currently a group called the Texas Camel Corps, whose mission is to promote the stories of camels, like Old Douglas, used during the Civil War.
