= Illinois Memorial =

Memorial in Vicksburg, Mississippi, U.S.

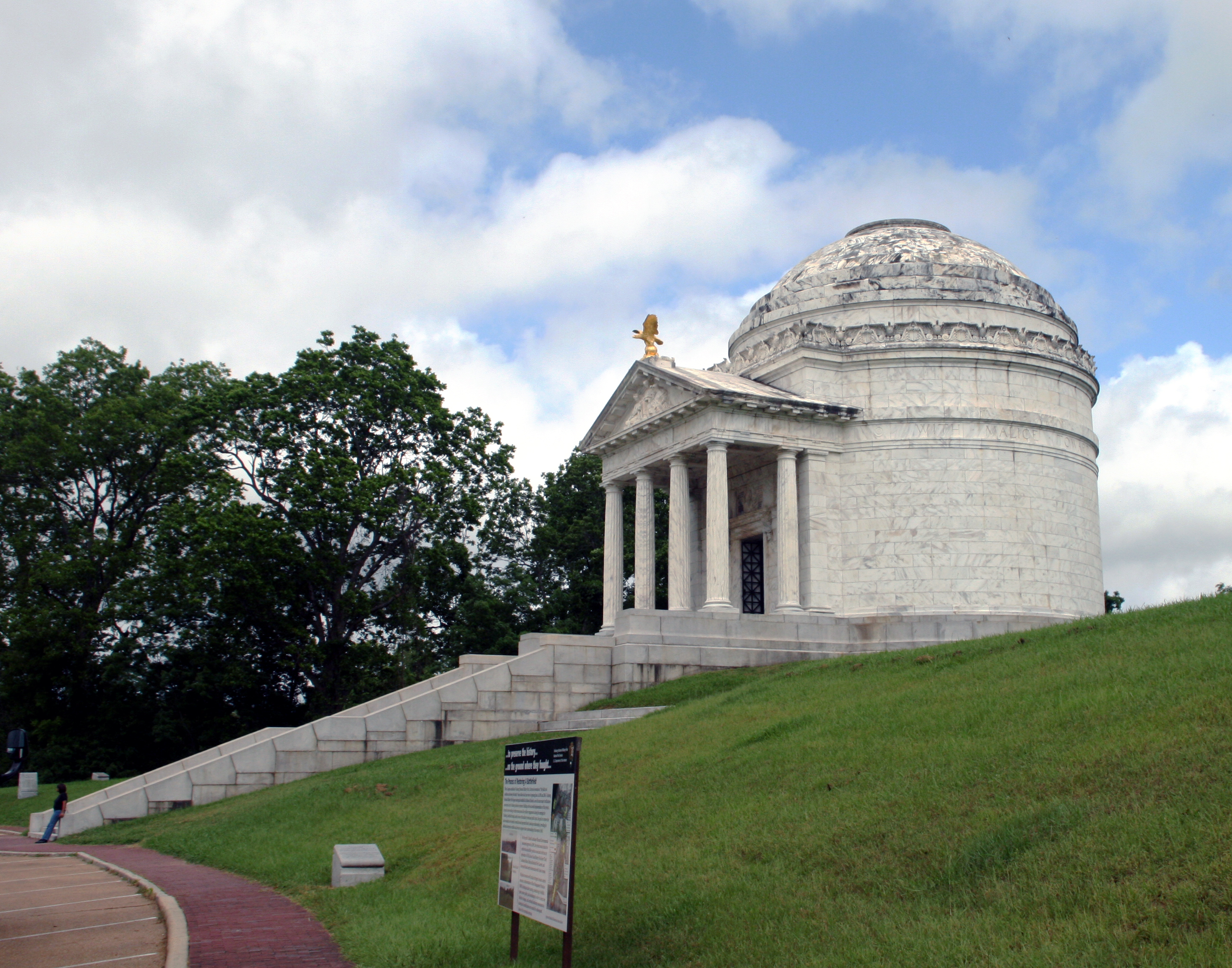
- The memorial in 2012
- Interactive map of Illinois Memorial
- Location: Vicksburg National Military Park, Vicksburg, Mississippi, United States
- Coordinates: 32°21′35.2″N 90°50′29.3″W
- Designer: William Le Baron Jenney (architect); Charles Mulligan (sculptor)
- Builder: Culver Construction Company
- Material: Georgia marble Granite; Bronze
- Height: 62 feet (19 m)
- Dedicated date: October 26, 1906
- Dedicated to: Illinois soldiers who fought in the Vicksburg campaign

The Illinois Memorial (also known as the Illinois State Memorial and the Illinois Monument) is a public memorial located at Vicksburg National Military Park in Vicksburg, Mississippi, United States. Dedicated in 1906, it honors the Union Army soldiers from Illinois who fought in the siege of Vicksburg during the Vicksburg campaign of the American Civil War. It was designed by architect William Le Baron Jenney and sculptor Charles Mulligan.

== History ==
=== Background ===
During the American Civil War, 36,325 Illinoisans served in the Union Army under general Ulysses S. Grant in the Vicksburg campaign. (Note: One source published by the United States Army gives this number as 36,312.) This large number of troops represented approximately 20% of the Union Army's forces during the campaign. (Note: One source published by the United States Army claims this number represented over half of the Union troops present at the siege.) The campaign culminated in the siege of Vicksburg, which ended in a Union victory on July 4, 1863, and ultimately led to U.S. control of the Mississippi River. The victory, coming a day after the Union victory at the battle of Gettysburg, is sometimes considered a turning point of the American Civil War.

In 1904, the government of Illinois appropriated over $190,000 (20% of their budget for that year) for the erection of a monument on the battlefield, now known as the Vicksburg National Military Park. The monument was designed by architect William Le Baron Jenney and sculptor Charles Mulligan. Jenney had previously served in the Union Army during the war and was later honored with a monument on the battlefield that was unveiled in 1911. The construction was carried out by the Culver Construction Company, with William B. Mundie serving as the general contractor. An additional sculpture in the memorial was designed by Frederick Hibbard, who would later design an equestrian statue of Grant in the park. Construction began in mid-1906 and was completed by October of that year. The total cost for the memorial, paid for by the state of Illinois, was $194,423.92.

=== Dedication and later history ===
The memorial was dedicated on October 26, 1906, in a ceremony attended by several thousand spectators, with many Illinois veterans travelling to the site via the Illinois Central Railroad. A large parade through the park was held as part of the event. A band performed several musical numbers, including "Tenting on the Old Camp Ground", "Dixie", "America", and "The Star-Spangled Banner". Illinois Governor Charles S. Deneen transferred ownership of the memorial to the U.S. government, and it was accepted by J. S. Schofield of the U.S. Department of War.

In the 1980s, the memorial underwent some restoration that included repointing and cleaning in the interior. In 1996, members of the Illinois Army National Guard and Mississippi Army National Guard participated in a joint activity near the memorial called the Blue and Gray Staff Ride, where they reenacted part of an assault on the location and held a wreath laying ceremony at the memorial. That same year, the statue of an eagle on the memorial was regilded, and several years later, additional gilding work was performed to the memorial. On October 28, 2006, a rededication ceremony was held on the 100th anniversary of the memorial.

== Design ==
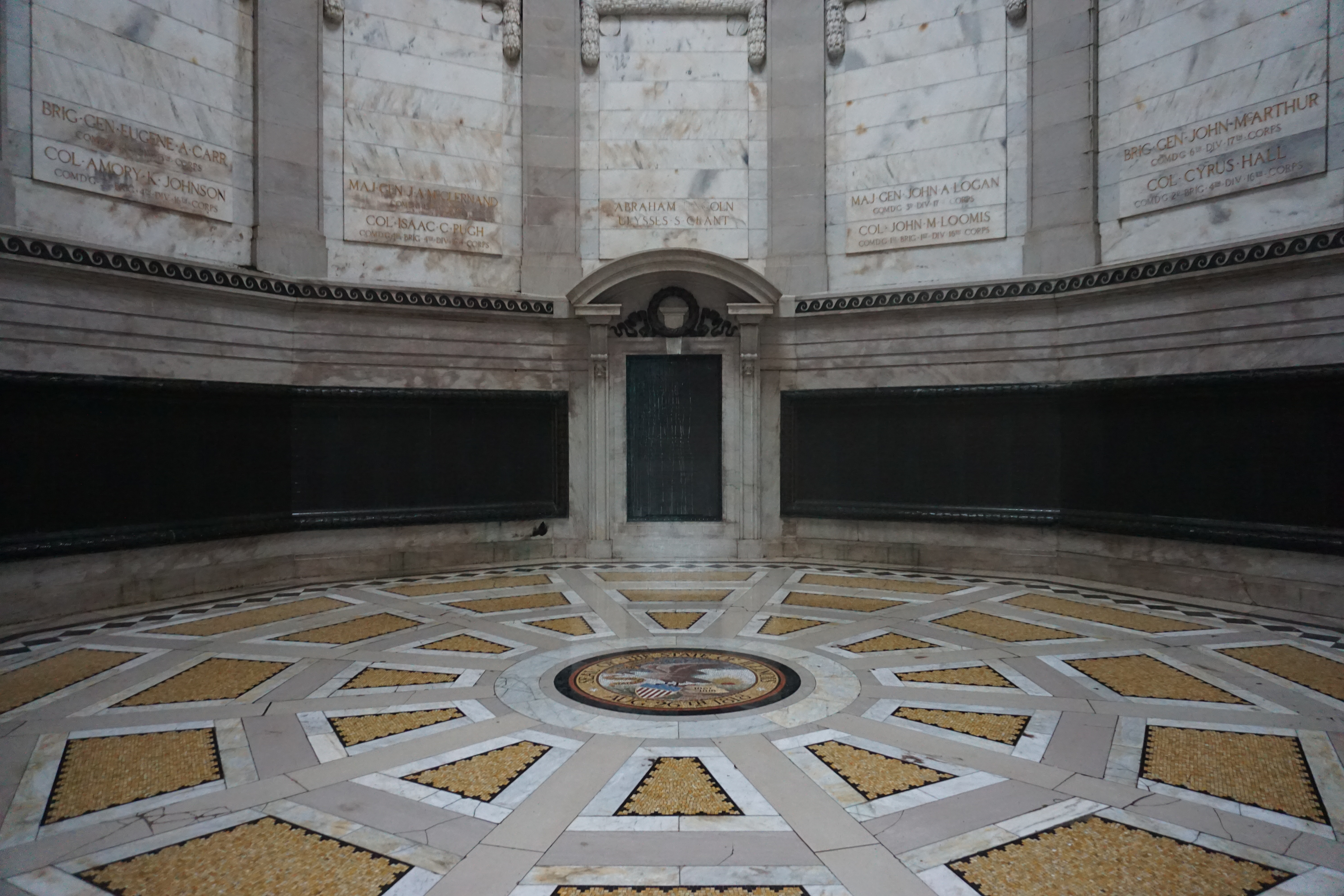
Interior of the memorial

The memorial's design was based on that of the Roman Pantheon. The base and stairway is made of granite quarried from Stone Mountain in Georgia, while the remainder of the 62-foot (19 m) structure is made of Georgia marble. It is the largest memorial on the battlefield. According to the National Park Service, "[n]o device indicative of war" is featured in the memorial, which was specified by the commission that oversaw its creation. Sixty bronze tablets line the interior of the memorial and bear the names of all 36,325 Illinois soldiers who participated in the campaign. A bronze statue of a bald eagle, sculpted by Hibbard, sits atop the memorial. It was gilded in the 1990s, along with lettering and other details on the interior. The stairway consists of 47 steps, one for each day of the siege. It is located near the Shirley House on the battlefield, along Jackson Road.

== See also ==
- 1906 in art
