= Lallah Miles Perry =

American, Southern, painter, art educator, and organizer

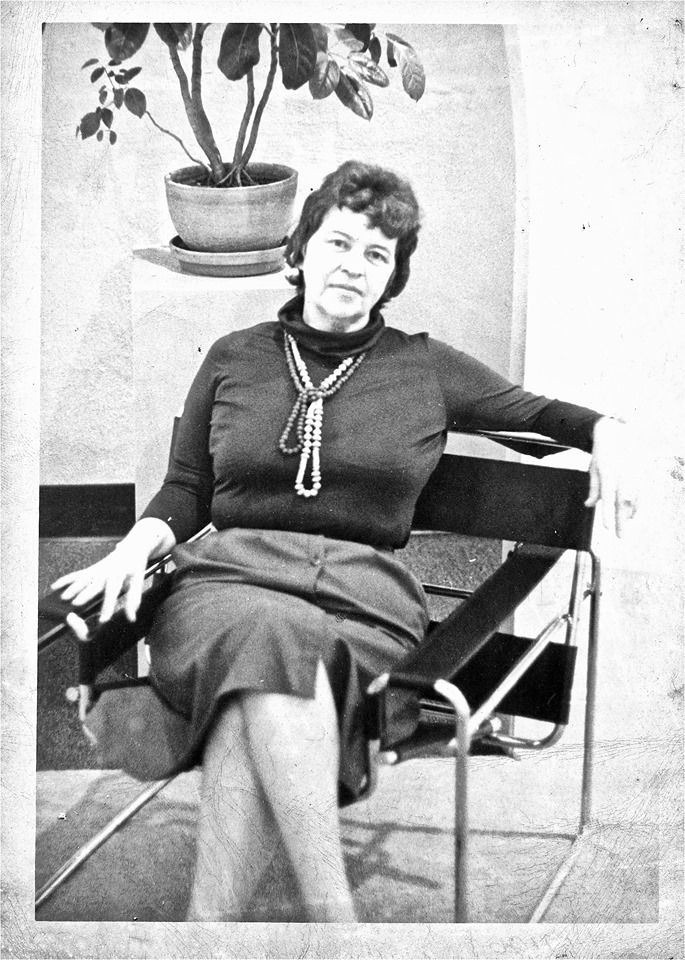
- Born: July 15, 1926; Auburn, Alabama
- Died: October 30, 2008 (aged 82); Jackson, Mississippi
- Education: Alabama Polytechnic Institute
- Known for: Painting, Textile arts
- Style: Mississippi Modernism
- Awards: Mississippi Governor's Award for Artistic Excellence 2008

Lallah Miles Perry (1926–2008) was an American artist who lived and worked in Mississippi. She specialized in painting, and was known as an art teacher at many institutions including at the Choctaw Tribal School System, Delta State University (where she was on the faculty for nine years) and Meridian Community College (for eight years, until her retirement as head of the art department in 1995.)

She helped reorganize the Mississippi Art Colony after a fire had destroyed the group's first home at Allison's Wells, and served as the first director of that organization following that fire. She later served for many years as the group's archivist.

She was also involved in the creation of the Craftsmen's Guild of Mississippi. She was awarded the Mississippi Governor's Award for Artistic Excellence in 2008 as an acknowledgement of her talent and her contributions to the arts in the State of Mississippi. The Mississippi Art Colony also gives out an award in her honor and memory, the Lallah Perry Award.

Her works have been exhibited in many museums, including the Mississippi Museum of Art, the Birmingham Museum of Art, the New Orleans Museum of Art, the High Museum of Art in Atlanta, the Memphis Brooks Museum of Art, the Knoxville Museum of Art, and the Society of the Four Arts in West Palm Beach, Florida. Her work is included in many private collections. One of her paintings was exhibited at the 1984 Louisiana World Exposition in New Orleans, and one painting was shown in the United States Embassy in Rabat, Morocco.

Since her death her works have continued to be displayed in exhibits of Mississippi artists.

== Biography ==
Lallah Perry accepting the Mississippi Governor's Award for Excellence in the Arts, April 2008

Lallah Miles was the oldest of four children born to Lee Ellis Miles and Rebecca Stodghill in Auburn, Alabama where her father was a plant pathologist at Alabama Polytechnic Institute (later renamed Auburn University.) She began painting at the age of thirteen. In 1928, when she was two years old, she moved with her parents to Starkville, Mississippi when her father took a position with the Mississippi Agriculture and Forestry Experiment Station at Mississippi State University in Starkville, Mississippi. While the family was in Starkville her first younger brother, Robert Lee Miles, died within hours of his birth in 1934. Three years later, her eight-year-old brother Charles Miles died from an allergic reaction to an insect bite. Both boys were returned to Auburn to be buried at Pine Hill Cemetery, and Charles' grave marker, a broken statue of a boy holding a tray with a lizard, is one of the more well-known markers in the cemetery.

When she was fifteen years old, her father died by a heart attack and her mother moved her and her younger brother back to Auburn. Lallah had been homeschooled up to this point but enrolled in Auburn High School and graduated at the age of sixteen. She had met her future husband, James Lafayette "Dick" Perry, back in Mississippi. While he was serving in the Navy during the Second World War, she enrolled at Alabama Polytechnic Institute and graduated at the age of nineteen with a degree in commercial arts. She married Dick Perry in December 1943 and, after graduation, moved with him to his hometown of Philadelphia, Mississippi where they started a family. She continued painting and began to attend the early days of the Mississippi Art Colony at Allison's Wells. By the 1950s her works were being selected for local exhibitions and winning prizes. She and her husband would go on to have four children.

In 1964 she began to teach art, at first in the Choctaw Tribal Schools and then in local public schools. In 1969 her husband died while piloting his small aircraft in a landing attempt at the local airport. Following his death she earned a master's degree in art education at Delta State University. She would continue to teach, serving for many years at Delta State University in Cleveland, Mississippi and Meridian Community College in Meridian, Mississippi. In the 1970s, she and artist Edward Gong owned an artist supplies store in Boyle, Mississippi called Innovations. In her later years she was represented by Southern Breeze Art Gallery in Jackson, Mississippi.

She died in Jackson, Mississippi in October 2008 and is buried in Cedarlawn Cemetery in Philadelphia, Mississippi.

== Influence ==
Artists who trained with Lallah Perry, or who have noted her influence on their work, include Millie Howell, Lurline Eddy Slaughter, Duff Dorrough, and Amy Giust. Also Harriett Ley DeWeese, who was recognized along with Millie Howell in textbooks on Mississippi HIstory in the late sixties, for being outstanding artists of Mississippi.
