= Statue of William McKinley (Chicago) =

Sculpture by Charles Mulligan

William McKinley statue
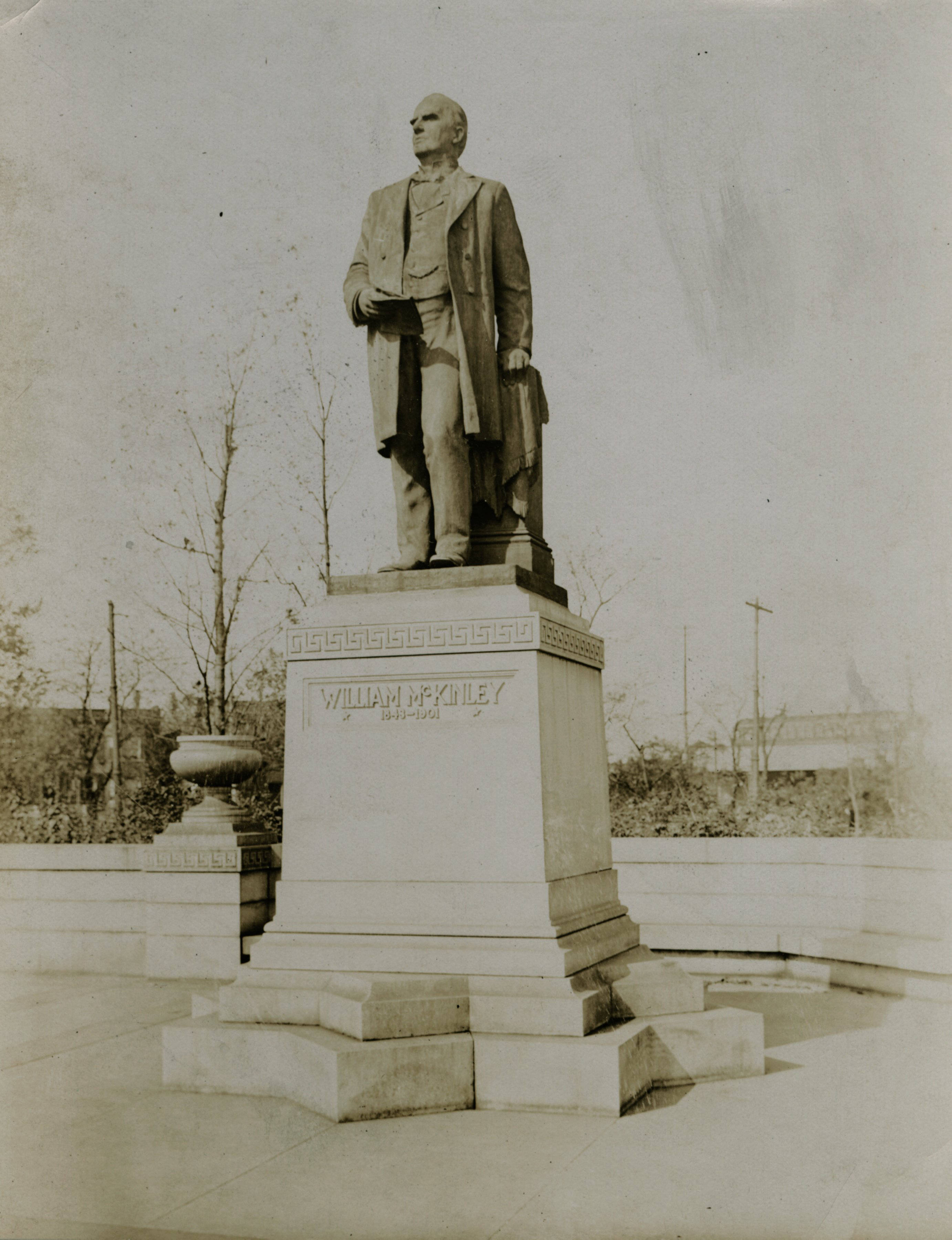
- William McKinley statue (c. 1905)
- Interactive map of William McKinley statue
- Location: McKinley Park, Chicago, Illinois, United States
- Coordinates: 41°49′34.61″N 87°41′1.9″W
- Designer: Charles Mulligan
- Material: Bronze
- Dedicated date: July 4, 1905
- Dedicated to: William McKinley

The William McKinley statue is a monumental statue of William McKinley in Chicago, Illinois, United States. Located in the McKinley Park neighborhood, the statue was designed by Charles Mulligan and dedicated in 1905.

== History ==
William McKinley was an American politician who served as the 25th president of the United States, first being elected in 1896. In 1901, he was assassinated in Buffalo, New York, during a world's fair held in the city. Following his death, there was a period of national mourning, and in Chicago, park commissioners acquired the site of the former Brighton Park Race Track for the purposes of converting it to McKinley Park in honor of him. In 1902, it was decided that a statue of McKinley should be present in the park, and in an effort to save money, park officials decided to recast an old statue of Christopher Columbus that had been erected in Grant Park during the 1893 World's Columbian Exposition. From its debut, the statue had been criticized from an aesthetics standpoint, and by 1897, it had been relocated to a place of storage in Washington Park. While the town of Menasha, Wisconsin had offered to take the statue from the city, park officials ultimately decided to recast 10 tons of bronze from that statue into the McKinley statue, reducing the cost from $6,000 to $3,500. The monument, designed by sculptor Charles Mulligan, was dedicated on July 4, 1905. Federal judge Peter S. Grosscup gave a speech at the ceremony.

== See also ==
- 1905 in art
- List of sculptures of presidents of the United States
