= Adams County Courthouse (Indiana) =

- U.S. National Register of Historic Places
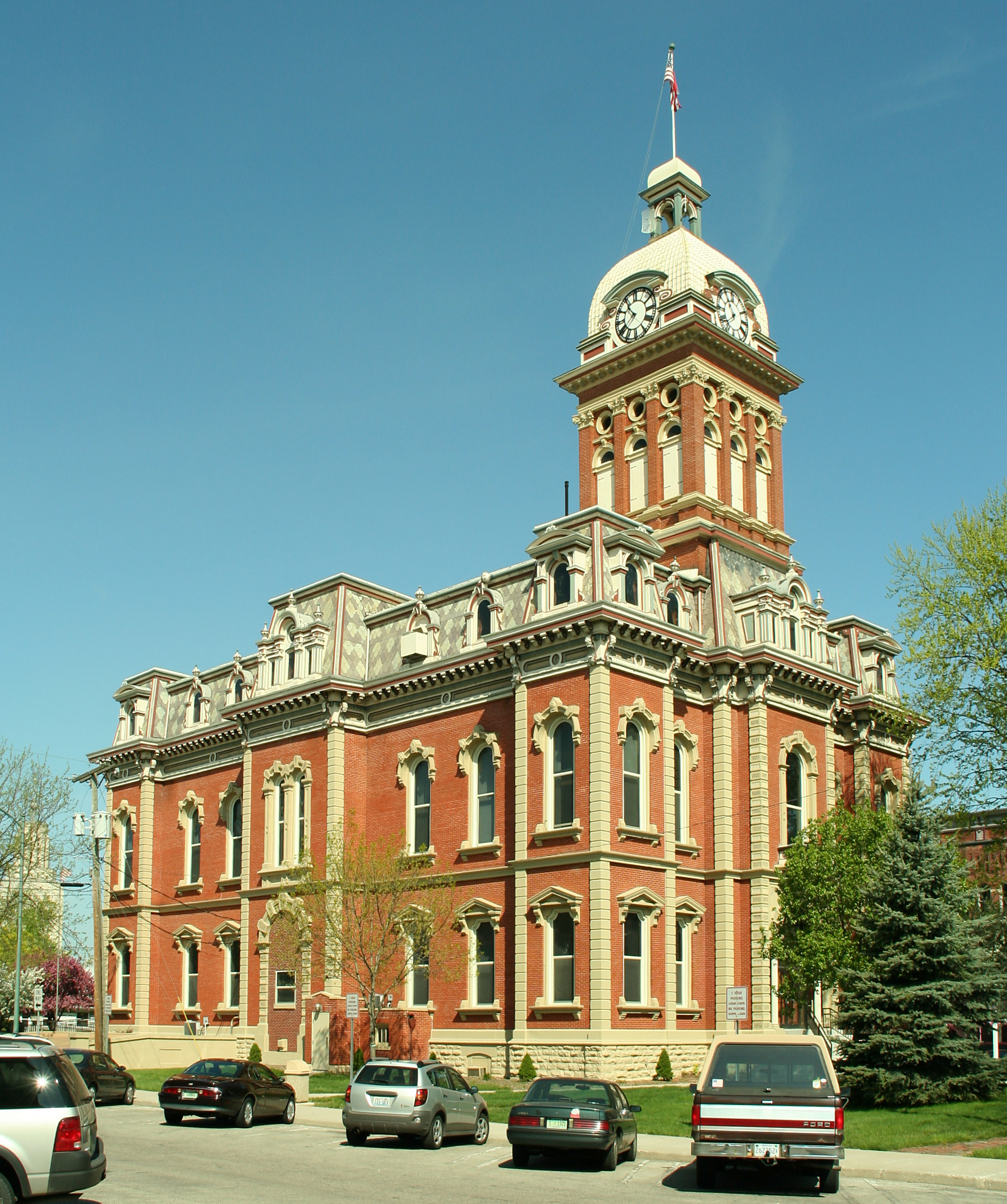

- Location within Adams County, Indiana Location within Indiana Location within the United States
- Location: 112 S. Second St., Decatur, Indiana
- Coordinates: 40°49′47″N 84°55′29″W
- Area: less than 1 acre (4,000 m^{2})
- Built: 1873
- Architectural style: Second Empire
- NRHP reference No.: 08000914
- Added to NRHP: September 17, 2008

Adams County Courthouse is located in the city of Decatur, the county seat of Adams County, Indiana. It was built in 1872–1873 at a cost of $78,979. (Note: A $79,000 capital expense in 1872 would be roughly equivalent to $18,900,000 in 2010.) The designer was J. C. Johnson, who had been trained as a carpenter and joiner and became a self-taught architect; he won second place in the Indiana State Capitol design competition.

== Construction ==
The construction was done by Christian Boseker of Fort Wayne. It is built of red brick with stone ornamentation.

The building and three associated objects was listed on the National Register of Historic Places on September 17, 2008. Included in the NRHP listing are:

- Peace Monument, a limestone statue of a female figure
- Elephant Rock, a memorial to author Gene Stratton-Porter, consisting of a gneiss glacial boulder with a bronze plaque
- Pioneer Memorial, a bronze plaque and stand, from 1936

== Featured property ==
It is the 12th property listed as a featured property of the week in a program of the National Park Service that began in July, 2008.
