= Pearlie Posey =

American artist (1894–1984)

- Born: 1894
- Died: 1984 (aged 89–90)
- Known for: textile artist

Pearlie Posey (1894-1984) was an American quilt artist and mother of Sarah Mary Taylor. She is known for her appliquéd quilts.

== Biography ==
Posey was born in 1894. She was a family-oriented woman who spent her days on a plantation working. Her mother, before her death, and grandmother helped her learn to quilt. She taught her quilting technique to her daughter Sarah Mary Taylor and eventually created templates for Taylor's quilts. Posey’s quilts often featured human and animal figures, reflecting African American storytelling traditions and the passing down of quilting through generations. Quilting during Posey’s time was commonly viewed as a domestic craft rather than a form of fine art.

Her work is in the collection of the Philadelphia Museum of Art and the American Folk Art Museum. Her work was included in the 2008-2009 traveling exhibition entitled Ancestry & Innovation: African American Art from the American Folk Art Museum presented by the Smithsonian Institution Traveling Exhibition Service. She was included in the 2009 exhibition Quilt Stories: The Ella King Torrey Collection of African American Quilts and Other Recent Quilt Acquisitions at the Philadelphia Museum of Art.

Posey died in 1984.
