= University of Mississippi Museum =

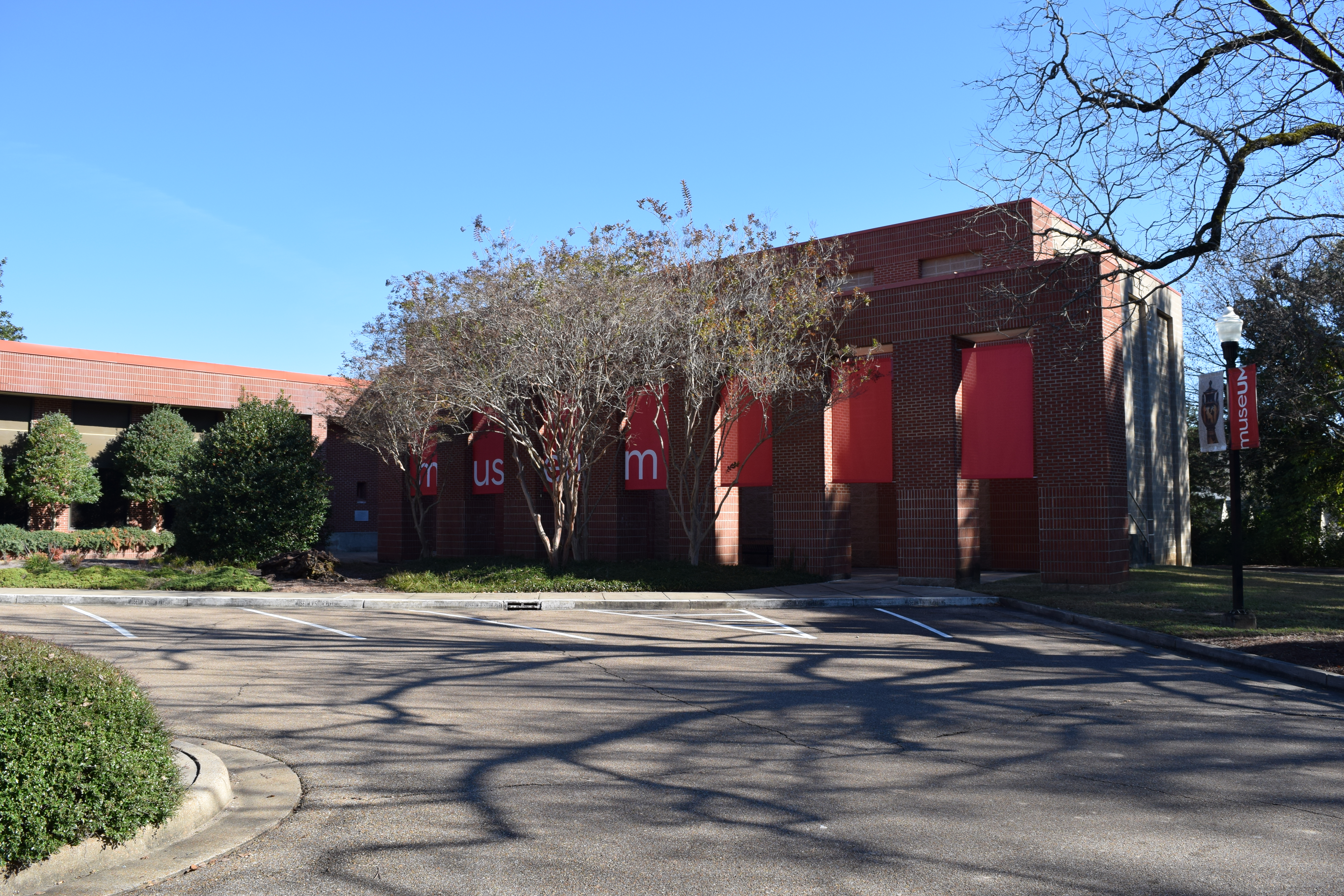
- The museum in 2018
- Established: 1939
- Location: University Avenue and 5th St. Oxford, Mississippi
- Coordinates: 34.3643°N 89.5253°W
- Type: Art museum
- Website: museum.olemiss.edu

The University of Mississippi Museum and Historic Houses is a museum and two historic houses owned and operated by the University of Mississippi in Oxford, Mississippi. The museum is designed to appeal to both a popular and scholarly audience, with a collection that emphasizes objects of regional interest. In addition to collections of Southern folk art, Greek and Roman antiquities, 19th century scientific instruments, and American fine art. Part of the museum complex is Rowan Oak, a historic literary legacy that was once the home of William Faulkner, Nobel and Pulitzer Prize-winning author. Rowan Oak was renovated and reopened to the public in 2001 and continues to draw international visitors each year. The museum also owns the Walton-Young Historic House – once home to critic and satirist Stark Young. The Walton-Young House is not currently open to the public.

== History ==
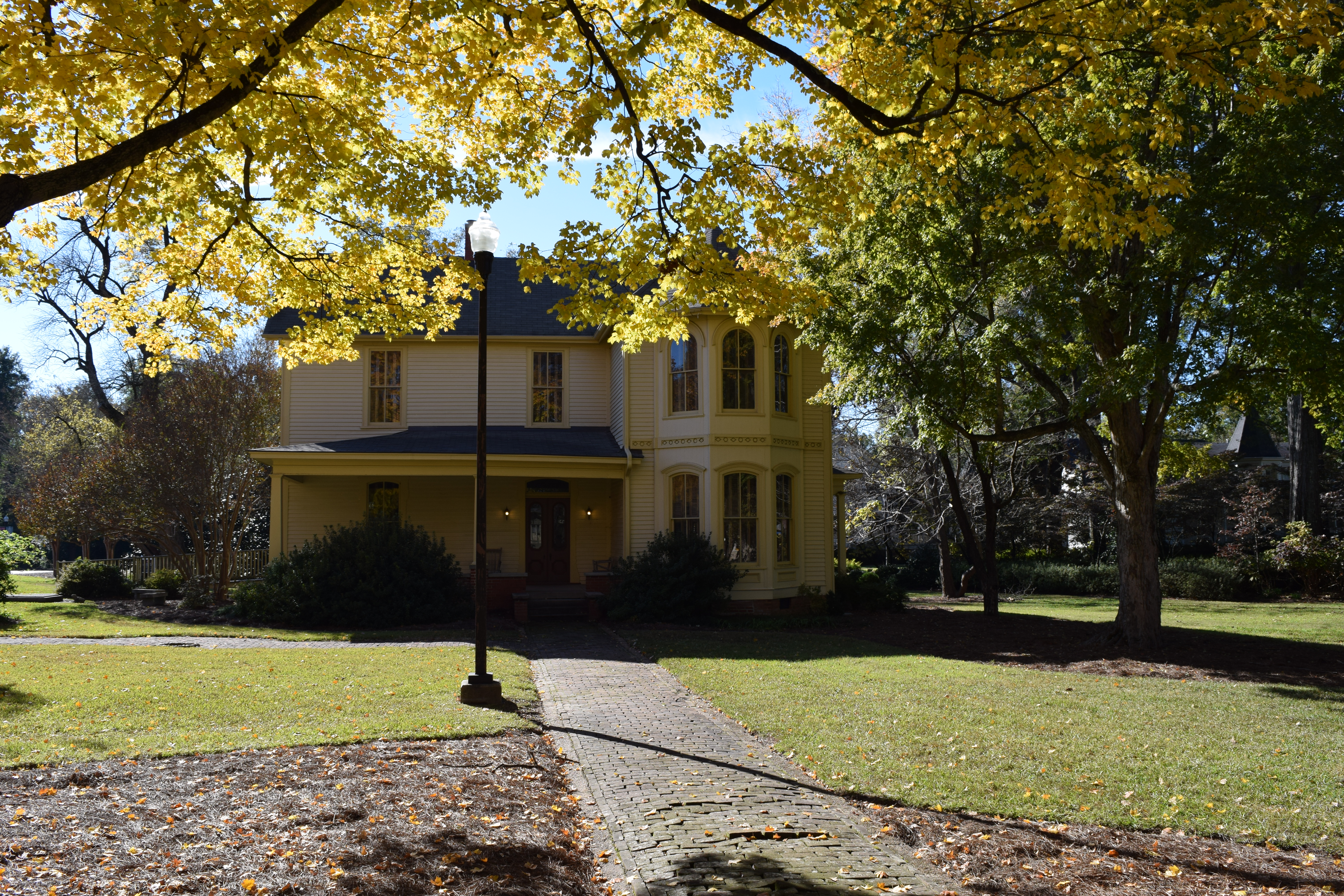
Walton-Young House

The museum complex began with the opening of the Oxford Art Center in 1939 as a result of the vision of Mary Skipwith Buie of Oxford, an avid collector and an academically trained artist. She left her personal art collection to the city of Oxford in her will, and these items are now in the museum's permanent collections. It also contained the collection of Mary's half-sister, Kate Skipwith, who possessed not only antiques, but such memorabilia as American Revolutionary War correspondence by notable Americans George Washington, John Hancock, and John Adams. Funding for the museum came from the generosity of her family, the Adair Skipwiths, and government programs such as the Works Progress Administration. The museum was renamed the Mary Buie Museum in her honor from 1942 until 1997. Oxford operated the original museum from 1939 through 1974, before deeding it to the University of Mississippi.

With the help of a legislative appropriation and funds from the Skipwith Foundation, the museum significantly expanded in 1977 with the opening of the Kate Skipwith Teaching Museum to house the David M. Robinson Memorial Collection of Greek and Roman Antiquities, along with the Millington-Barnard Collection of 19th Century Scientific Instruments. The museum again grew in 1998 with the addition of the Seymour Lawrence Gallery to showcase the work of American Modernists, such as Georgia O’Keeffe, Arthur Dove, John Marin, and Marsden Hartley. Collectively, the Walton-Young Historic House, the Buie Museum and the Skipwith Museum were called the University Museums.

== See also ==
- University of Mississippi
- Mississippi
- Oxford, Mississippi
- Lucy C. Turnbull
