= Ella King Torrey =

American scholar and academic administrator (1957–2003)

President of San Francisco Art Institute
- In office 1995 – April 2002
- Preceded by: William O. Barrnett
- Succeeded by: Larry Thomas

Personal details
- Born: June 21, 1957 Bronxville, New York (state), United States
- Died: April 30, 2003 (aged 45) San Francisco, California, United States
- Relations: Ella King Russell Torrey (mother)
- Education: Yale University, University of Mississippi
- Occupation: Academic administrator, professional fundraiser, arts advocate, art historian

Ella King Torrey (1957–2003), was an American academic administrator, professional fundraiser, arts advocate, and art historian. She was president of San Francisco Art Institute from 1995 to 2002; and was known for creating opportunities for visual artists.

== Early life and education ==
Ella King Torrey was born in 1957, in Bronxville in Westchester County, New York (state). She grew up both in Evansville, Indiana, and in Philadelphia, Pennsylvania. Her mother was Ella King Russell Torrey.

She graduated in art history in 1980, from Yale University. Her thesis was on the cultural effects of Barbie dolls. Torrey continued her studies at the University of Mississippi (UM), where deepened her learning on contemporary folk art, and Black quilt making traditions. While attending UM, Torrey worked with the Center for the Study of Southern Culture, and curated a traveling exhibition on folk art toys. Her master's thesis was on folk art painter, Theora Hamblett.

== Career ==
After graduating in 1985, Torrey became a program officer at the Pew Charitable Trusts in Philadelphia, an NGO working on the creation of artists' subsidized housing, and fundraising for local music organizations. During her time at Pew, she founded and led the Pew Artists Fellowship Program.

In 1995, Torrey was elected president of the San Francisco Art Institute (SFAI), where she worked to amend some of the structural problems related to the organizational finances. During her time at SFAI, she tripled the schools endowment, added a few new trustees, and generally improved the school's reputation. Torrey resigned in 2002, as SFAI faced financial problems, and after an auditing firm found irregularities in 2001.

She died on April 30, 2003, at the age of 45, in her home in the Potrero Hill neighborhood in San Francisco. The cause of death was not disclosed; however, some news reports attributed her death to suicide. Her memorial service was held at the Yerba Buena Center for the Arts in San Francisco, with a second service was held at the Santa Monica Museum of Art (now Institute of Contemporary Art, Los Angeles).

After her death the Ella King Torrey Arts Fund was created at the Germantown Friends School in Philadelphia. Her collection of quilts from 1980 to 1983, the Ella King Torrey Collection of African American Quilts, are now part of the collection at the Philadelphia Museum of Art.

== See also ==
- African-American art
- History of quilting
- Quilts of Gee's Bend
