= Meridian Community College =

Public college in Meridian, Mississippi, US

Coordinates: 32°22′01″N 88°43′58″W

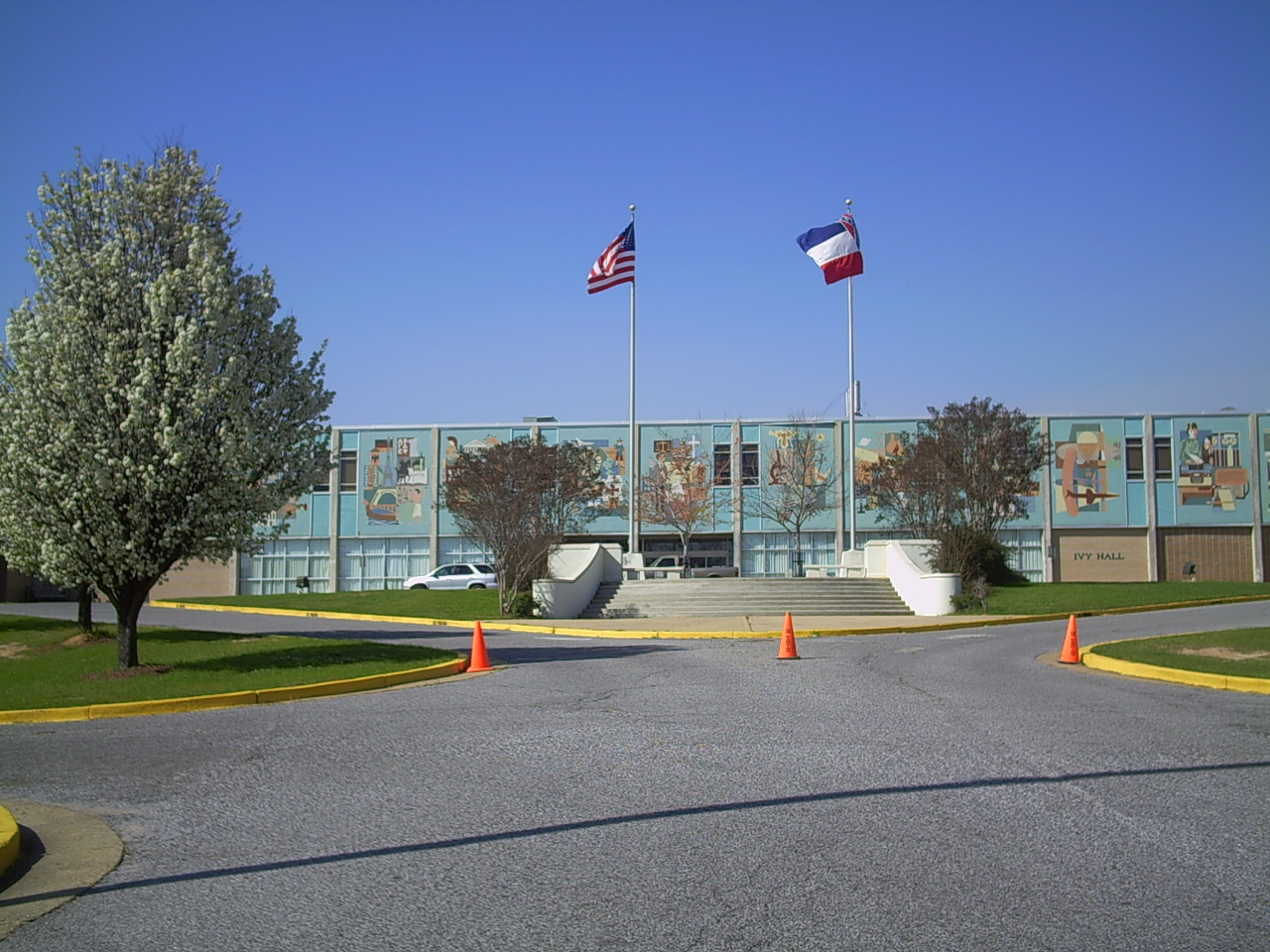
- Type: Public community college
- Established: 1937
- Academic affiliations: Space-grant
- President: Tom Huebner
- Faculty: 147 (44 male / 103 female)
- Students: 3,435 (2005)
- Location: Meridian, Mississippi, United States
- Campus: Urban, Commuter
- Colors: Green, White
- Mascot: "Victor the Eagle"
- Website: www.meridiancc.edu

Meridian Community College is a public community college in Meridian, Mississippi. Founded in 1937, it was originally named Meridian Junior College but changed its name in 1987.

== History ==
Founded in 1937 as the "13th" and "14th" grades at Meridian High School, Meridian Community College is the only one of Mississippi's 15 public community colleges to originate through the initiative of the local school system. MCC began as the vision of Dr. H.M. Ivy (1884–1977), superintendent of the Meridian Separate School District in the 1930s. The college, then known as Meridian Junior College, operated at Meridian High School until 1964 when the college moved to its present location.

In 1970, the college merged with the historically black T.J. Harris Junior College as a result of a federal court order to the Meridian Municipal Separate School System. More than 400 students joined the MJC campus from Harris that year.

Meridian Junior College made its final break with Meridian Public schools by establishing its own district and board of trustees in 1980.

As part of its 50th anniversary celebration, the college changed its name to Meridian Community College to more accurately reflect the diversity of opportunities it provides for a growing community area.

== Campus ==
The college is located on a 72-acre (29 hectare) campus located a short distance from downtown Meridian and is next to the campus of Mississippi State University's Meridian Campus. Other facilities not located at the main campus include the college's Truck Driving School and Magnolia Hall which is widely used by the community.

== Student life ==
Meridian Community College offers students a wide variety of activities in which to participate. There are more than 20 student organizations on campus representing a wide range of academic and vocational interest. Many of the student organizations have won acclaim from local to international levels. In fact, in 2006, the college's Nu Upsilon Chapter of Phi Theta Kappa International Honor Society for the two-year college was recognized as one of the Society's top chapters in the world. WEXR serves as the college radio station.

== Sports ==
MCC's athletic teams are called the "Eagles." "Victor the Eagle" is the official mascot and can be seen at various athletic events. MCC has won five NJCAA National Championships. MCC's athletic teams include men's sports: basketball, baseball, soccer, golf, tennis, swimming, cross-country, and track and field. Women's sports include basketball, softball, soccer, tennis, swimming, cross-country, and track and field.

Unlike other Mississippi community colleges, MCC does not play football. MCC is, however, a member of the Mississippi Association of Community Colleges Conference (MACCC), formerly known as the MACJC. Previously, MCC was not a conference member and competed in Division I in the sports it offered, while members of the MACJC competed, for the most part, in Division II. The Eagles' main Division I rivals were both in Louisiana, Baton Rouge Community College and Delgado Community College in New Orleans. MCC is now a member of the Southern Division of the MACCC.

The MCC Golf program is the only Division I NJCAA program in Region XXIII. Twenty MCC golfers have signed scholarships with various four-year schools in the past decade, including Ole Miss, Mississippi State University, Troy University, Middle Tennessee State University, Southern Miss, and the University of New Orleans. Former MCC golf coach, Lou Hart was inducted into the Mississippi Sports Hall of Fame on July 27, 2007. Former MCC golf coach Sean Covich, who played under the direction of Coach Hart from 1998 to 2000, was named the NJCAA Region XXIII Golf Coach of the Year and Mississippi Association of Community/Junior Colleges Golf Coach of the Year in 2007 after leading the Eagles to a school record nine tournament titles, including the 2007 MACJC State/NJCAA Region XXIII championships. The 2007 squad finished third in the NJCAA division II men's golf championship. In 2009 Covich then became the only coach in NJCAA Region XXIII history to lead a team to both a top ten NJCAA national finish at Division I and at Division II as he led the Eagles to a sixth-place finish in the school's first-ever NJCAA Division I National Championship. Covich led MCC to a NJCAA Division I national championship runner-up finish in 2010, and also led freshman Brandt Garon to the school's first individual national championship. Garon won the Golf Coaches Association of America (GCAA) Arnold Palmer Award in 2010 and then the GCAA's Jack Nicklaus Award in 2011 as the national player of the year.

== Notable people ==
Jamario Moon, former professional basketball player of Los Angeles Clippers in the NBA, played for Meridian "Eagles" for one season (1999/2000; his only season of college basketball), and averaged 20.8 points and 8.7 rebounds pre game.

Retired NBA player, Ronald "Flip" Murray (Chicago Bulls) attended MCC and played basketball for the Eagles in 1997/98-1998/99.

Two former MCC Track and Field athletes have gone on to compete in the Summer Olympics. Coby Miller competed in the 2000 and 2004 Olympic Games and Miguel Pate who competed in the 2008 Olympic Games.

Several MLB players have started their careers with MCC, including Cliff Lee and Corey Dickerson.

Former Major League Soccer star Damani Ralph played soccer for MCC. He scored 59 goals in 45 games for the Eagles and was named MVP for the 2000 NJCAA tournament, which MCC also won. He then went on to play for University of Connecticut before being drafted by the Chicago Fire.

Corey Dickerson (born 1989) is a baseball player with the St. Louis Cardinals.

The artist and painter Lallah Miles Perry was on the faculty and taught art and painting at Meridian Community College for many years before retiring as head of the art department in the mid-1990s.

Writer Brad Watson attended Meridian Community College before completing his bachelor's degree at Mississippi State University.
