= WEXR =

Coordinates: 32°19′30″N 88°41′17″W

- De Kalb, Mississippi; United States
- Broadcast area: Meridian, Mississippi
- Frequency: 106.9 MHz
- Branding: 106.9 The Eagle

Programming
- Format: College Radio

Ownership
- Owner: Meridian Community College Foundation

History
- Former call signs: WMMZ (1998); WMLV (1998–2005); WKZB (2005–2011)

Technical information
- Licensing authority: FCC
- Facility ID: 82188
- Class: A
- ERP: 2,300 watts
- HAAT: 164 meters

Links
- Public license information: Public file; LMS
- Website: meridiancc.edu/about_mcc/wexr/index.html

WEXR (106.9 FM) is a radio station broadcasting in the Meridian, Mississippi, area. Its transmitter is located on Mississippi Highway 145 south of Meridian. WEXR is part of the Alert FM digital alert and messaging system for Lauderdale County first responders.

In September 2011 WKZB was donated to Meridian Community College.

On September 9, 2011 WKZB changed its callsign to WEXR and changed formats from classic hits to college radio, branded as "The Eagle".

== See also ==
- Campus radio
- List of college radio stations in the United States
