= Vicksburg National Military Park =

American Civil War historic site

- U.S. National Register of Historic Places
- U.S. National Military Park
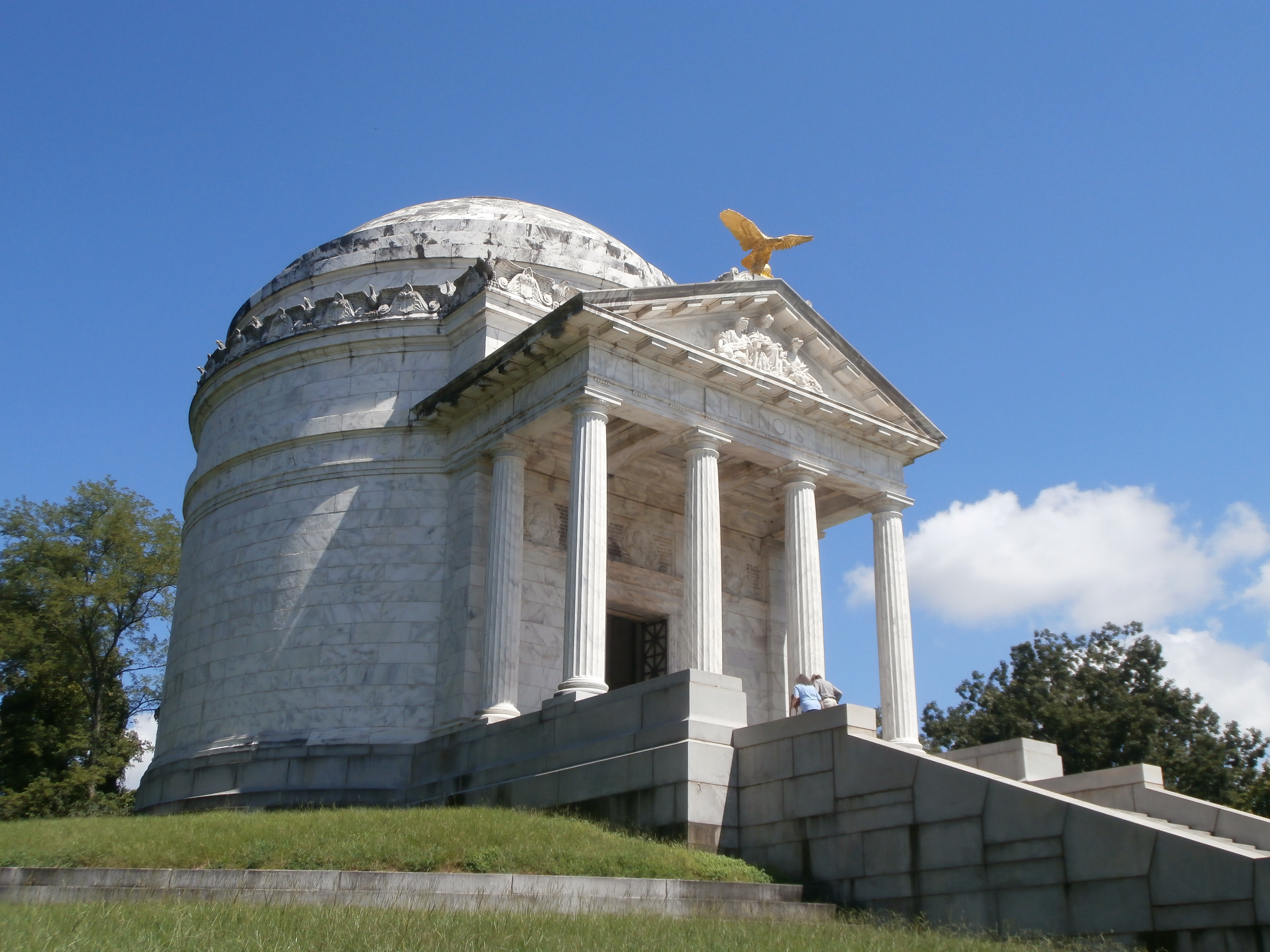
- The Illinois Memorial in Vicksburg National Military Park

- Location within Mississippi Location within the United States
- Location: Vicksburg, Mississippi, U.S.
- Coordinates: 32°21′55″N 90°50′32″W
- Area: 2,524 acres (10.2 km^{2}; 3.9 sq mi)
- Visitation: 410,300 (2025)
- Website: Vicksburg National Military Park
- NRHP reference No.: 66000100

Significant dates
- Added to NRHP: October 15, 1966
- Designated NMP: February 21, 1899

Vicksburg National Military Park preserves the site of the Siege of Vicksburg, waged from March 29 to July 4, 1863 during the American Civil War. The park, located in Vicksburg, Mississippi, flanks the Mississippi River and commemorates the greater Vicksburg campaign, which led up to the battle. Reconstructed forts and trenches evoke memories of the 47-day siege that ended in the surrender of the city. Victory here and at Port Hudson, farther south in Louisiana, gave the Union control of the Mississippi River.

== Battlefield ==
The park includes 1,325 historic monuments and markers, 20 miles (32 km) of historic trenches and earthworks, a 16-mile (26 km) tour road, a 12.5-mile (20.1 km) walking trail, two antebellum homes, 144 emplaced cannons, the restored gunboat USS Cairo (sunk on December 12, 1862, on the Yazoo River), and the Grant's Canal site, where the Union Army attempted to build a canal to let their ships bypass Confederate artillery fire. The Cairo, also known as the "Hardluck Ironclad", was the first U.S. ship in history to be sunk by a torpedo and was recovered from the Yazoo in 1964. The Illinois Memorial has 47 steps, one for every day Vicksburg was besieged. It is also part of the NPS and is a national battle site.

=== Campaign against Vicksburg ===
- Battle of Chickasaw Bayou
- Battle of Arkansas Post
- Battle of Grand Gulf (April 29, 1863)
- Battle of Snyder's Bluff (April 29 – May 1)
- Battle of Port Gibson (May 1)
- Battle of Raymond (May 12)
- Battle of Jackson (May 14)
- Battle of Champion Hill (May 16)
- Battle of Big Black River Bridge (May 17)
- Siege of Vicksburg (May 18 – July 4)

== Cemetery ==
The 116.28-acre (0.4706 km^{2}) Vicksburg National Cemetery is within the park. It has 18,244 interments (12,954 unidentified). The Vicksburg National Cemetery is abutting the Beulah Cemetery.

The time period for Civil War interments was 1866 to 1874. The cemetery is not open to new interments. The cemetery has only one Commonwealth war grave, of an airman of Royal Australian Air Force buried during World War II.

== Grant's Canal ==
The remnants of Grant's Canal, a detached section of the military park, are located across from Vicksburg near Delta, Louisiana. With the approval of President Abraham Lincoln, the project was commenced by Union Army Major General Benjamin Butler in June 1862, with the work assigned to Brigadier General Thomas Williams. The project was halted in July of that year due to massive amount of disease and sickness among the soldiers and former slaves doing the hard labor of constructing the ditch, and falling water levels on the river.

in January 1863, Union Army Major General Ulysses S. Grant ordered the project restarted as part of his Vicksburg Campaign; the task was assigned to Brigadier General William T. Sherman. Neither Grant nor Sherman had any faith in the success of the canal, but the scheme was a favorite of Lincoln's.

The goal of the project was to alter the course of the Mississippi River to bypass the Confederate guns at Vicksburg. For various technical reasons, the project failed to meet this goal. Grant, however, used the canal project to keep his troops occupied during the laborious maneuvering required to begin the Battle of Vicksburg.

== Administrative history ==
The national military park was established on February 21, 1899, to "commemorate the siege and defense of Vicksburg". The park and cemetery were transferred from the War Department to the National Park Service (NPS) on August 10, 1933.

In the late 1950s, a portion of the park was transferred to the city as a local park in exchange for closing local roads running through the remainder of the park. It also allowed for the construction of Interstate 20. The monuments in land transferred to the city are still maintained by the NPS. As with all historic areas administered by the NPS, the park was listed on the National Register of Historic Places on October 15, 1966. Over half a million visitors come to the park every year.

In 2000, the Mississippi House of Representatives approved funding a monument to recognize African-American soldiers in the United States Civil War.

== Gallery ==
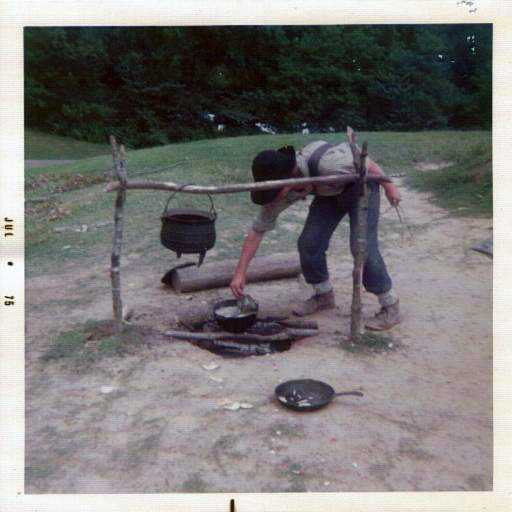
Park ranger prepares meal in campfire demonstration at Vicksburg National Military Park (1975)

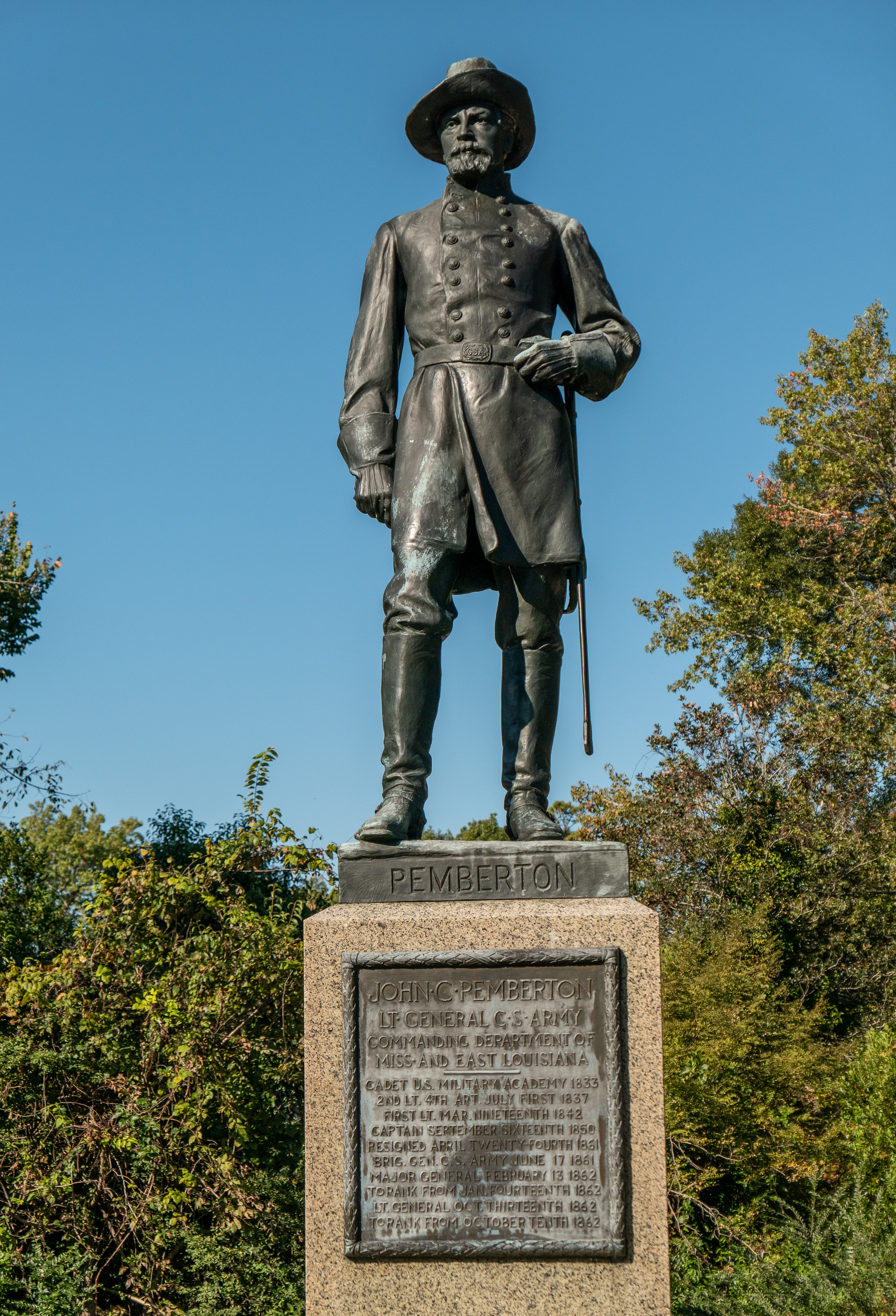
Confederate lieutenant general John C. Pemberton, sculpted by Edmond Thomas Quinn

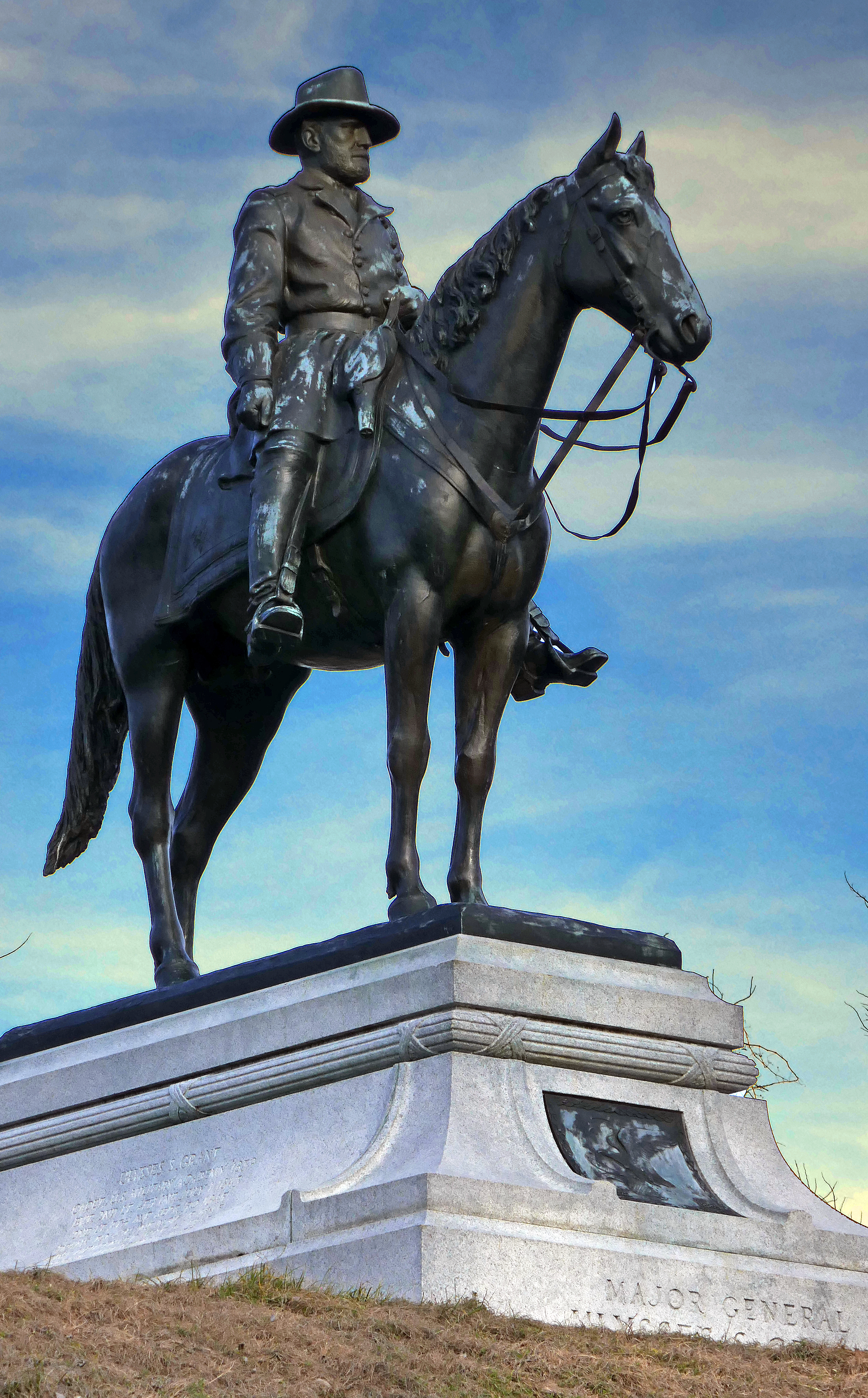
Union general Ulysses S. Grant, sculpted by Frederick Hibbard

"Map of the Vicinity of Vicksburg, Warren County, Mississippi" created by the U.S. government around 1874, showing the location of the national cemetery (NAID 26465540)

== See also ==
- Michigan Memorial
- Cedar Hill Cemetery (Vicksburg, Mississippi)
