= Center for Southern Folklore =

Nonprofit organization in Tennessee, United States

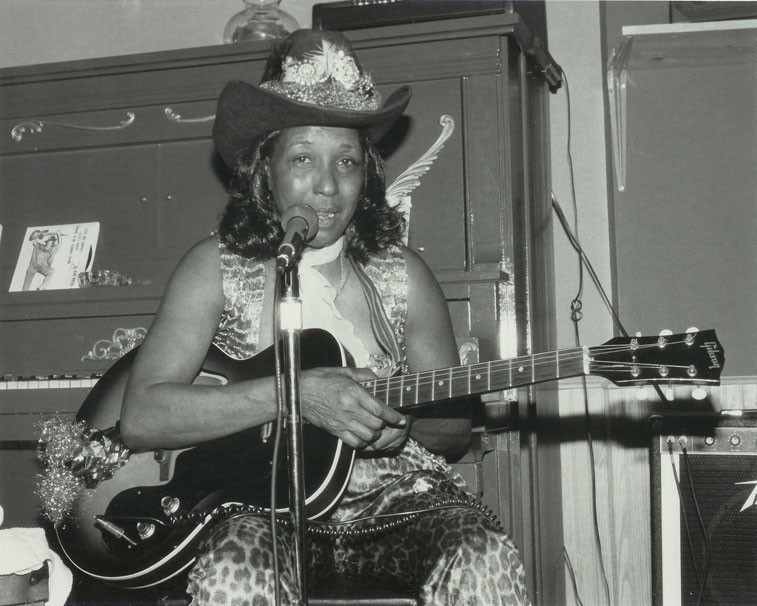
Jessie Mae Hemphill performs at a Center for Southern Folklore event in the 1980s.

The Center for Southern Folklore is an American non-profit cultural organization based in Memphis, Tennessee. Founded in 1972 by William Ferris and Judy Peiser, its mission is "to preserve, defend, protect and promote the music, culture, arts, and rhythms of the South."

The Center produces documentary films and maintains a large archive of video and audio recordings of music and narratives, contemporary and historical photographs, film and slides, and selected artifacts and art. The Center also has a gallery that shows regional folk art and photographs, a cafe featuring live performances by local blues, folk, Latin, and jazz musicians, and a folklore store selling art, photographs, posters, and CDs by Memphis-area musicians.

In the early 1980s, they employed Mose Vinson to perform at special cultural festivals, and he played at concerts plus educational and cultural events associated with the Center, until shortly before his death in 2002.

The Center also sponsors the annual Memphis Music and Heritage Festival, which is held each Labor Day weekend.
