= Sarah Mary Taylor =

American artist (1916–2000)

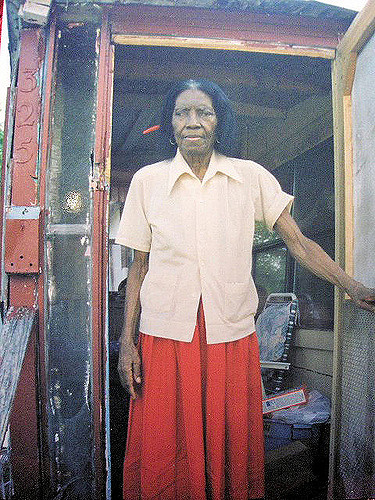
- Taylor in 1997
- Born: August 12, 1916; Anding, MS
- Died: July 10, 2000 (aged 83); Yazoo City, MS
- Occupation: Artist/Quilter
- Known for: Fabric Artist & Designer

Sarah Mary Taylor (August 12, 1916, in Anding, MS – July 10, 2000, in Yazoo City, MS) was an African American quiltmaker from Mississippi whose work attracted interest in the 1970s.

== Life ==
Sarah Mary Taylor was born on August 12, 1916, in Anding, Mississippi. She learned quilting from her mother Pearlie Posey when she was young. She lived on plantations in the Mississippi Delta and worked as a housekeeper, cook, and field hand. Late in her life, Taylor was forced to retire due to her failing health. She then earned income through quilting, using the skirts of dresses to create pieced quilts. Taylor garnered more interest in her appliquéd quilts after Pecolia Warner's quilts were the subject of University of Mississippi professors academic interest in the 1970s.

Both Taylor and her mother created quilt and pillow designs that employed red Vodun doll-like figures. Her Mermaid quilt (earlier known as Rabbit) is evocative of the mojo hand, featuring blue hands adjacent to red squares and vodou figures. According to art historian Maude Southwell Wahlman, Taylor "has made numerous quilts that play on the symbolic connotations and aesthetic qualities of the hand image." Wahlman writes that Taylor's Cross quilt may represent a continuation of the Kongo cosmogram, a Kongo religious symbol. Taylor's quilts also employ incongruous and clashing color combinations. She was commissioned to make a hand quilt for the film The Color Purple. Both this quilt and an appliquéd word quilt of hers form part of the Ella King Torrey Collection of African American Quilts.

Taylor married five times and had one child, Willie, who preceded her in death. She died July 10, 2000.

Taylor's quilts have been displayed in Naperville, Illinois, Santa Fe, New Mexico, Philadelphia, Pennsylvania, and at the International Quilt Museum, among other American venues. Marilyn Nelson wrote the poem "The Century Quilt" for her.

Taylor's work was included in the 2004 Richard E. Peeler Art Center exhibit, "Mind Storm: Contemporary American Folk Art from the Arient Family Collection." In 2020, The New Yorker noted there was an online exhibit of Taylor's work, "Don't Mess with Me," on August 31, 2020, by the Shrine Museum, New York.
