= Sitdown strike =

Labour strike tactic in which workers remain at their stations but refuse to work

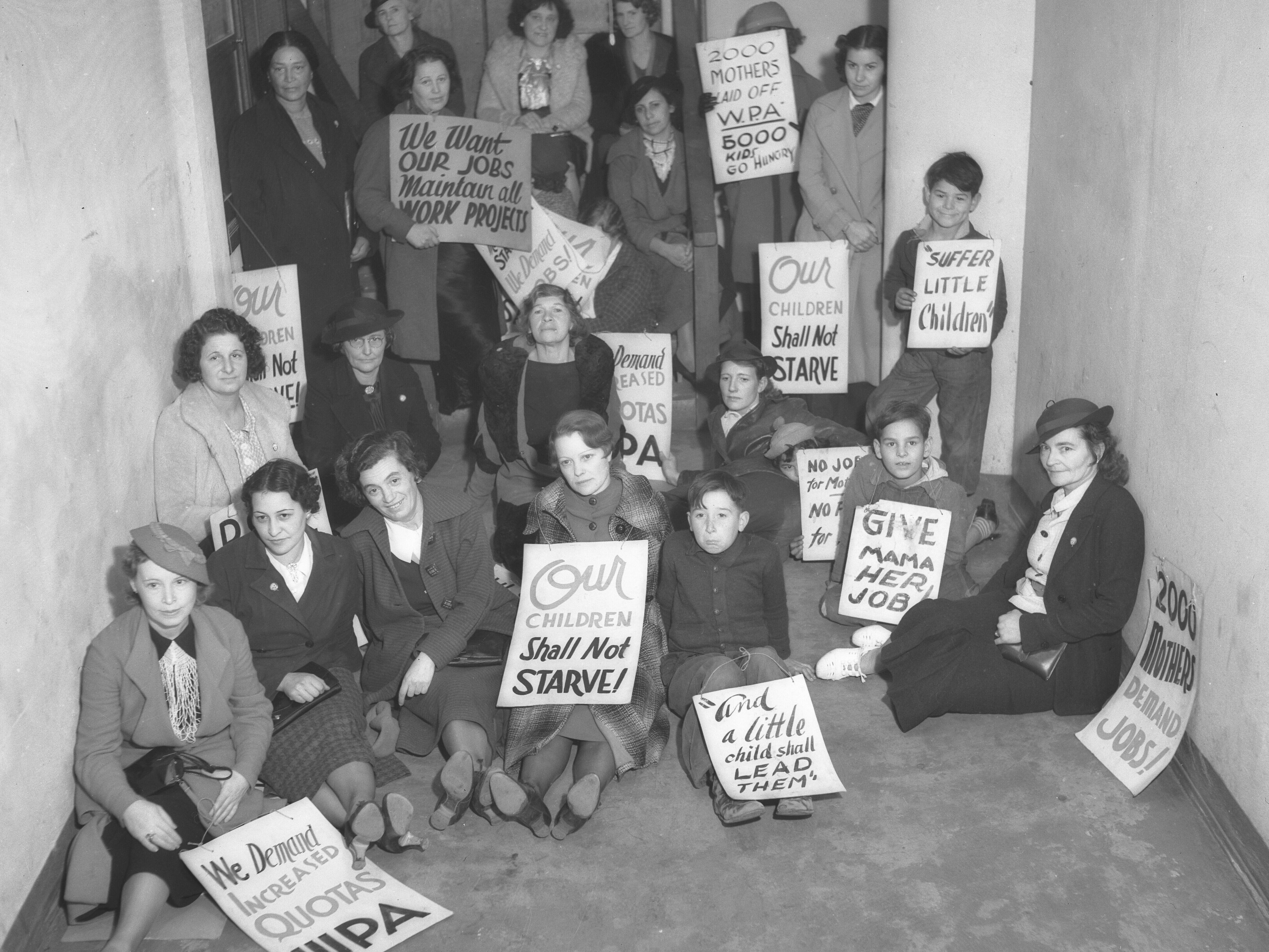
Women workers at the Works Progress Administration on strike in 1936.

A sit-down strike (or simply sitdown) is a labour strike and a form of civil disobedience in which an organized group of workers, usually employed at factories or other centralized locations, take unauthorized or illegal possession of the workplace by "sitting down" at their stations. By taking control of their workplaces, workers engaged in a sit-down to demonstrate their power, build solidarity among themselves, prevent the deployment of strikebreakers or removal of industrial equipment, and cause cascading effects on the chain of production within and between factories. However, sit-down strikes are illegal in the vast majority of countries, complicating their use.

Sitdown strikes played a central role in the unionization of manufacturing in the United States and France. In major strikes in the rubber and automotive industries in the United States, labor organizers with the United Rubber Workers of America and United Automobile Workers adopted the sitdown strike as a means for demanding unionization of factories, achieving major successes at Goodyear Tire (1936), General Motors (1936–37), and Chrysler (1937). Sit-down strikes peaked in the United States in 1937, and rapidly declined as workers began to face criminal prosecution for occupations while the National Labor Relations Board supervised both unionization elections and collective bargaining by between recognized unions and employers. While some sit-down strikes still occur in the United States, they tend to be spontaneous and short-lived.

A wave of sit-down strikes in France in May to August 1936 demanded and won union recognition and industry-wide negotiations on wages and benefits, and coincided with state guarantees of limited hours, vacation pay, and other social reforms.

== Form and purpose ==
Writers in the 1930s, 1960s, and early 2000s have all described the same basic forms of sitdown or sit-in strikes. Author Louis Adamic, in his account of the late 1930s wave of sit-down strikes in the United States wrote the following definition in the fall of 1936:

SITDOWN, n. Act of quitting work in one or a few departments of a delicately organized mass-production factory with the aim of stopping operations in the entire or most of the plant; specif. such an act done by mutual agreement by workers in one or a few departments of such a factory as a means of enforcing compliance with demands made upon their employers; sudden strike workers in one or a few departments of such a factor, decided upon and called by themselves while on the job, usually without the sanction of any recognized labor-union leader or official and, as a rule, of short duration, the strikers and the rest of the workers remaining idle (sitting down) by their machines or belt conveyors pending the compliance with their (the strikers') demands. See STAY-IN and QUICKY.

Ahmed White distinguishes three types of sit-in strikes: "short, 'quickie' strikes, characterized by brief, on-the-job work stoppages," like those described by Adamic; "the classic 'stay-in' strike", defined "a work stoppage in which the strikers occupied the workplace to prevent the employer from using it for a considerable period of time"; and "'skippy' strikes, characterized by intentionally sloppy performance on the production line." Sit-down strikes also built upon the tactics, used by the Industrial Workers of the World, of the "folded arms strike" and "striking on the job" (which, according to Adamic, "required men to pretend they were working, and to accomplish as little as possible without being discharged").

In factories built around assembly lines, sit-down strikes enabled small numbers of workers to interrupt production across an entire plant. In industries with complex chains of production, such as automobile manufacturing, it likewise projected power outward from a factory on strike: "just as a militant minority could stop production in an entire plant, so if the plant was a key link in an integrated corporate empire, its occupation could paralyze the corporation." Adamic describes the sit-down strike as educating workers about their power as well as providing an opportunity to organize non-union workers:

And sitting by their machines, caldrons, boilers, and work benches, they talked. Some realized for the first time how important they were in the process of rubber production. Twelve men had practically stopped the works! … The active [i.e., pro-union] rank-and-filers, scattered through the various sections of the plant, took the initiative in saying, 'We've got to stick with 'em!' And they stuck with them, union and non-union men alike.

White describes this process as "an extraordinary forum for cultivating loyalty and solidarity among workers, offering rank-and-file workers a salient symbol of the union's ability to confront the employer, as well as numerous occasions for the actual practice of mutual support."

When feasible, sit-down strikes offered numerous strategic and tactical advantages. Adamic observed in the 1930s that "[Quickie] sitdowns are quick, short, and free of violence." The tactic prevents employers from replacing them with strikebreakers or removing equipment to transfer production to other locations. Neal Ascherson has commented that an additional attraction is that it emphasizes the role of workers in providing for the people and allows workers to in effect hold valuable machinery hostage as a bargaining chip. Other advantages listed by Adamic include:

- Sitdown strikes happen inside factories, where workers have the advantage of familiarity and knowledge of the space. This contrasts with the tactical advantages that police and private security have in outdoor picket lines.
- While many workers are morally opposed to sabotage, "The sitdown is the opposite of sabotage… It destroys nothing."
- By stopping work but keeping workers in a single space, the sitdown strike generates a new and enjoyable social space for hundreds or thousands of workers: "The sitdown is a social affair. Sitting workers talk. They get acquainted. And they like that."

Labor strategists who recognized the value of the sit-down strike include Dutch Council Communist Anton Pannekoek, American labor historian Jeremy Brecher, and sociologist Beverly Silver.

== History ==
In describing the origins of the sitdown strike, scholars, workers, and politicians have pointed to construction strikes at the pyramids of ancient Egypt and medieval European cathedrals. Strikes by crews aboard merchant ships, which peaked in the eighteenth century "were (and remain) like sit-down strikes by their very nature" and spread to the rest of the maritime industry. Early twentieth-century stoppages were recorded in the French, Argentine, and United States rail industry.

In September 1920, the Federation of Italian Metal Workers led a wave of strikes over wages, eventually involving nearly five hundred thousand workers, and featuring numerous factory occupations. During the struggle, workers began operating some factories under their own control and Communist factory workers demanded control of the industry itself by workers' councils. Workers staged strikes that occupied mines in Greece, Yugoslavia, Hungary, Poland, Spain, France, England, and Wales from 1934 to 1936. These included a successful strike in Carniola in July 1934. A major sitdown strike occurred on 22 March 1936 at Krakow's Semperit rubber works, during which violence claimed the lives of six people.

Labor historian Michael Torigian argues that the use of sit-down strikes and factory occupations by labor organizers in the United States and France in the 1930s marked an important shift in the role of the sitdown strike. In the United States and France, the sitdown strikes became "an aspect of the evolving labor movement as it pursued union goals within the context of the Fordist-Taylorist factory system", specifically the creation of industry-wide unions like the United Auto Workers. As a tool for industry and even nationwide unionization, Torigian concludes, sit-down strikes "took on a significance, a character, and an effect quite unlike anything that had previously occurred."

=== United States ===
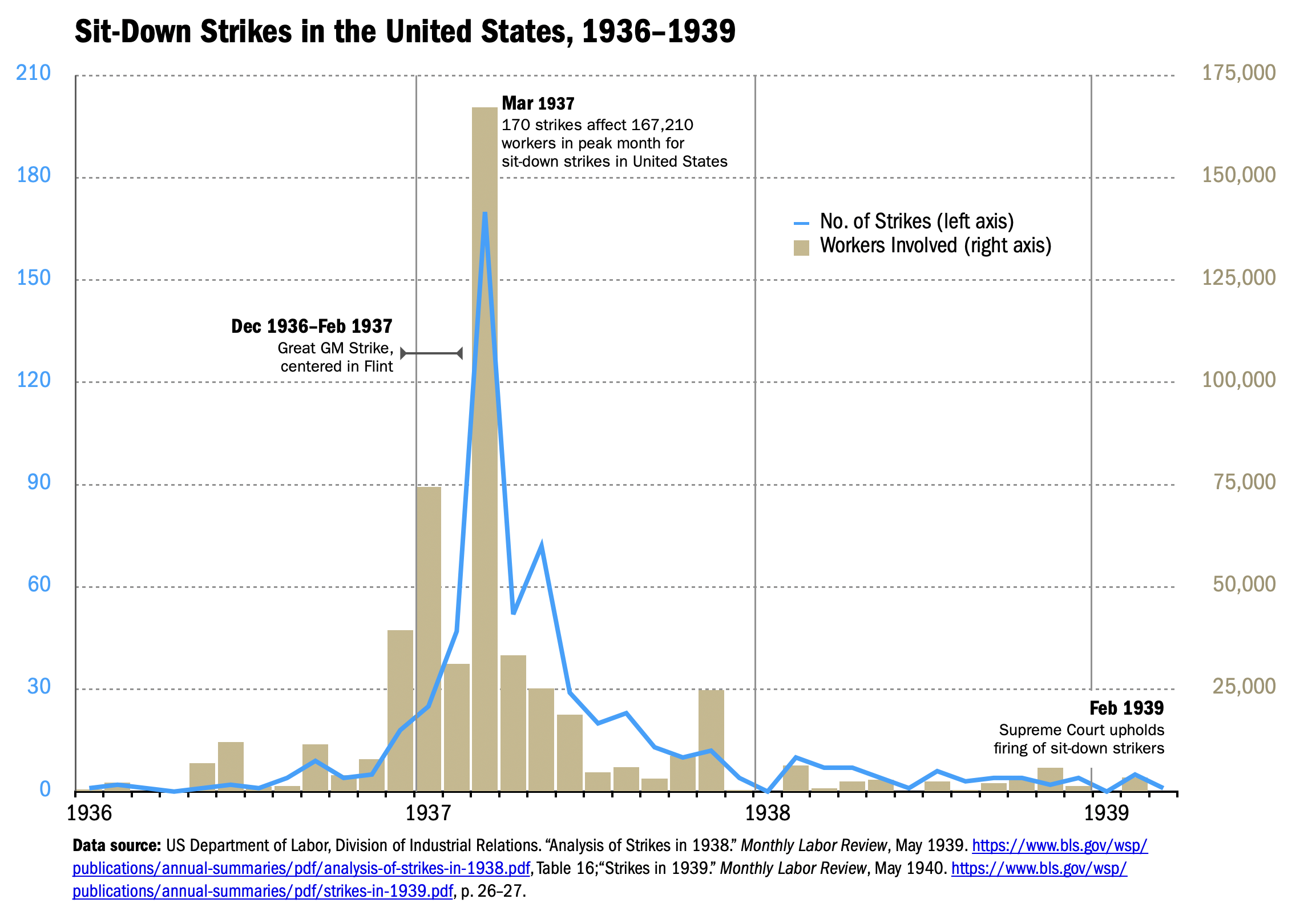
Chart of sit-down strikes in the United States from 1936 to 1939

A few sit-down strikes happened in the United States before 1933. Pittsburgh steelworkers occupied a mill in 1842. In 1884, brewery workers in Cincinnati barricaded themselves for three days. New York City laundry workers sat down in 1896 in support of a garment workers’ strike. The Industrial Workers of the World were involved in the most prominent early sit-down in the United States—at the General Electric plant in Schenectady, New York, in 1906. This strike, which lasted 65 hours, was the first over-night "stay-in" in the United States. Adamic describes the 1922 Amoskeag textile strike in Manchester, New Hampshire as "something very close to a stay-in."

During the 1930s, the sit-down strike was reinvented and used by American workers at a scale never seen before or since. Ahmed White attributes its popularity to rising labor militancy combined with new official acceptance of labor rights through the National Industrial Recovery Act (NIRA, 1933; invalidated by the Supreme Court in 1935) and the National Labor Relations Act (1935). Around six hundred meatpacking workers sat down for three days at the Hormel Packing Corporation in Austin, Minnesota, in November 1933. Minnesota's governor called up the National Guard, but also pressed Hormel to negotiate with the workers rather than retaliate for their actions. A significant number of sit-down strikes were organized in the rubber and automotive industry from 1933 to 1935, most of them "of the quickie variety," according to Sidney Fine.

In Akron, Ohio, rubber workers innovated sitdown strike tactics during the 1930s. Louis Adamic, reporting on the phenomenon had originated outside the factory in a baseball game played between two teams of rubber workers in 1933. During the game, players discovered that a disliked umpire was not a union man and sat down on the field and interrupted their game. Their factory-worker audience joined the protest and "yelled for an umpire who was a union member, cheered the NIRA, and generally raised a merry din, till the non-union umpire withdrew and a union man called the game." Within weeks a factory dispute touched off a sitdown action in one department, which soon idled other departments and shut down the plant, and the dispute was resolved in their favor in less than an hour. Similar strikes proliferated in Akron rubber factories over the following years, sometimes extending into multiple day "stay-in" strikes.

In June–July 1934, 1,100 workers at General Tire conducted a two-day sit-down strike followed by a month-long conventional strike and picket, resulting in victory for the union's demands. While General Tire did not formally recognize the union, it raised wages, promised to disband the company union, rehired fired strikers, instituted a seniority pay system, and agreed to meet union representatives on request. In early 1936, a series of smaller, brief sit-down strikes from at Firestone, Goodyear, and Goodrich from 28 January through 14 February presaged a larger conflict. Management responded to sit-downs at Columbia Chemical Company (17–18 February in Barberton) and at Goodyear (17–22 February) by physically isolating striking workers to a part of the plant, resulting in stay-in strikes supported by outsiders bringing food. The latter strike evolved into the Great Goodyear Strike of 1936, which was resolved on terms favoring the workers and the United Rubber Workers union on 21 March. It was a major victory for the labor movement, established the United Rubber Workers as the dominant union in the rubber industry, and provided a new tactic for future labor struggles.

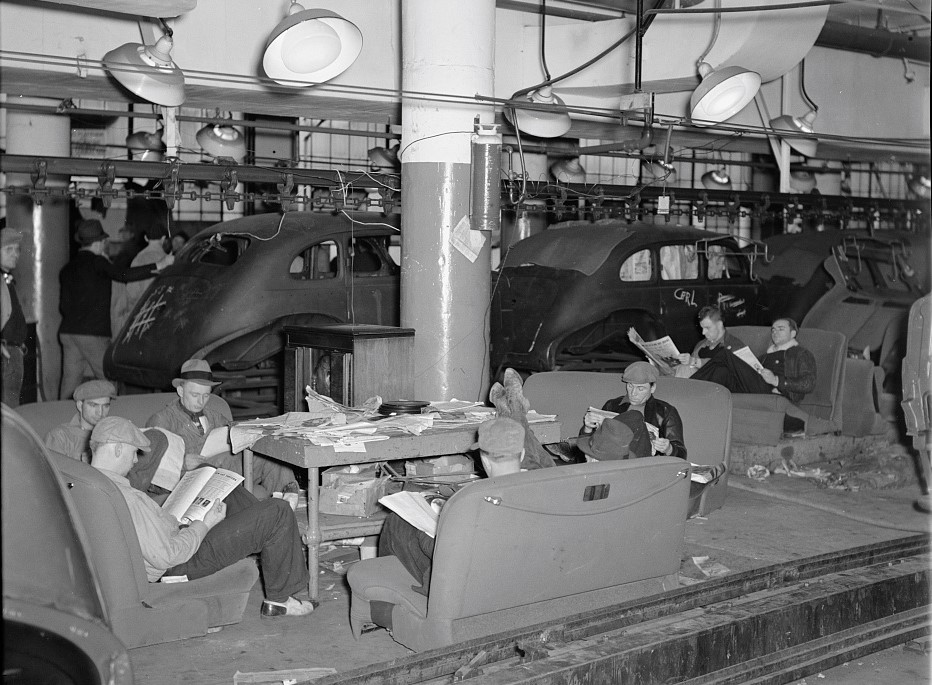
Sitdown strikers in the Flint strike of General Motors, 1937

Buoyed by sit-in strikes at the Atlanta and Kansas City Fisher Body plants (November and December 1936), the United Auto Workers began to demand to represent General Motors workers nationwide, part of the Congress of Industrial Organizations' (CIO) vision for industrial unionism. An initial strike in Cleveland on 28 December was followed by the famous Flint sit-down strike on 30 December. In Flint, Michigan, strikers occupied several General Motors plants for more than forty days, and repelled the efforts of the police and National Guard to retake them. That led GM to recognize the autoworkers union. By 25 January, strikes and the effects of production shutdowns idled 150,000 workers at fifty General Motors plants from California to New York. On 11 February 1937, General Motors agreed to bargain with the UAW, marking a turning point in American unionism.

A wave of sit-down strikes followed but diminished by the end of the decade as the courts and the National Labor Relations Board held that sit-down strikes were illegal and sit-down strikers could be fired. The Bureau of Labor Statistics counted 583 sit-down strikes from 1936 to 1939, involving the workplaces of 518,099 workers.

==== Legality ====
The legality of the sit-down strike was in flux during the mid-1930s, the period when the tactic was most used. Labor strikes themselves had sometimes been illegal during the four decades prior to the 1935 National Labor Relations Act (NLRA). In the 1936–37 Flint strike, the UAW argued that the sit-down strike, like the conventional picket line, prevented employers from hiring strike-breakers and that the striking worker was "protecting his private property–his right to a job." Other advocates expected the practice to soon be legalized, just as striking had been by the NLRA. The UAW also justified the sit-down strike as a reasonable response to the employer's failure to bargain collectively and refrain from unfair labor practices as directed by the NLRA. General Motors, joined in this opinion by the American Civil Liberties Union, held that the sit-down strike constituted an illegal trespass. Michigan Governor Frank Murphy, whose restraint of law enforcement affected the Flint strike, felt that the sit-down strike was illegal, but could be legitimized in the future. Historian Sidney Fine wrote, "Since the sit-downers were pursuing objectives sanctioned by law but denied them by their employer, their unconventional behavior was tolerated by large sections of the public."

Employers sought and received court injunctions against the Akron rubber strike and the GM strike, but these and many other sit-down strikes were resolved by union–employer agreements, many of which reinstated any workers fired for participating in sit-downs. The National Labor Relations Board also ordered employers to reinstate workers fired for sit-down striking until this power was removed by the Supreme Court. The 1939 Supreme Court ruling in NLRB v. Fansteel Metallurgical Corp. affirmed that sit-down strikes were illegal and held that strikers had no recourse if they were fired in retaliation. In the 1941 case Southern Steamship Co. v. NLRB, the Supreme Court held that sailors who went on strike aboard ship were guilty of mutiny and could not claim protection of labor law. Ahmed White argues that these cases "provided a legal foundation on which expanded attacks on the right to strike could be based."

==== Wildcat sit-down strikes ====
After this period, the sit-down strike was "relegated to the ranks of illegal and illegitimate protest" in the United States, but became "a weapon of the militant rank and file," when they were willing to act outside of official union channels (See: Little Steel strike). Such wildcat strikes, such as two stoppages at Chrysler plants in Detroit in 1973, sometimes won on-the-job changes.

During a 1989 strike of Pittston Coal, ninety-eight members of the United Mine Workers (and one clergyman) occupied a mine for three days in a collective action they called "Operation Flintstone" to honor the 1936–37 UAW strike. Workers vacated the mine after three days and a court order. The strike was won months after the September occupation.

In December 2008, workers at a Republic Windows and Doors warehouse in Chicago responded to their firing amid the company declaring bankruptcy by initiating a sit-down strike occupying the worksite. The workers demanded vacation and severance pay, and to be re-hired by a new owner of the site, winning both demands.

=== France ===
French metal and automotive workers conducted sit-down strikes beginning in 1931 amid the Great Depression. At least 31 strikes occurred in 1931, beginning at the Chenard-et-Walker auto body plant in March. Lengthier strikes affected auto producers Renault, Citroën, and Fiat from 1931 to 1935. In all of these strikes, workers did not remain in the workplaces overnight, though sitdowns often kicked off longer-duration strikes that continued outside the plants.

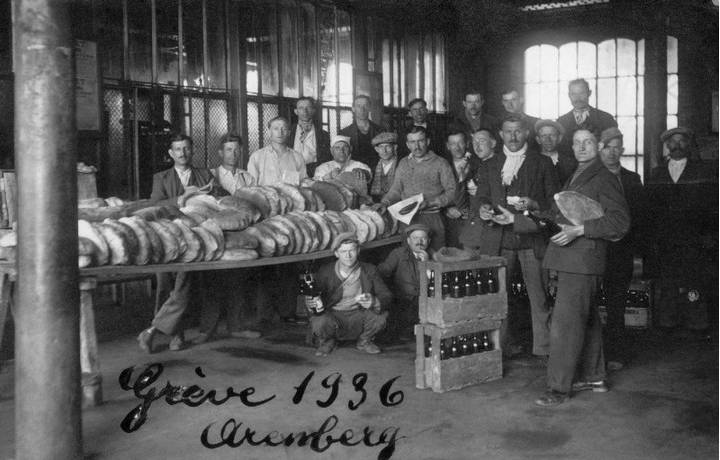
Striking mine workers receiving bread during a 1936 strike at Fosse Arenberg

Coordinated strikes in France led to political changes and industry-wide bargaining agreements in 1936. First, a conventional general strike in February built an alliance among left political forces and trade unions, which led to Popular Front electoral victory in the elections of April and May 1936. Sitdown strikes won concessions from employers in mid-May in Le Havre, Toulouse, and Paris, proving the tactic's effectiveness in French industry. Around 600,000 demonstrators took part in a 24 May march to the Mur des Fédérés commemorating the Paris Commune. On 26 May, metal workers mobilized by the Paris Metal Union (affiliated with the CGT) began occupying six factories in this industry. Other factories soon joined, including the automaker Renault. After a brief negotiated end to the occupations, 150,000 metal workers occupied workplaces on 2 June. After assuming office on 4 June, Prime Minister Léon Blum oversaw negotiations with the CGT and industry, resulting in the 7 June Matignon Agreement: "granting union recognition, a hefty wage hike, a system of shop stewards, as well as the principle of the forty-hour week and the two-week paid vacation." However, strikes and occupations continued to multiply, eventually drawing in 2 million workers. Collective bargaining with industry and new legislation passed by the Popular Front in May resulted in wage increases, a system of industry-wide collective bargaining, vacation pay, and other gains for workers. While the strike wave peaked in June, some workers remained on strike as late as August 1936.

=== United Kingdom ===
In 1973, the workers at the Triumph Motorcycles factory at Meriden, West Midlands, England, locked the new owners, NVT, out following the announcement of their plan to close Meriden. The sit-in lasted over a year until the British government intervened, the result of which was the formation of the Meriden Motorcycle Co-operative which produced Triumphs until their closure in 1983.

=== Switzerland ===
In November 2010, workers at the International Labor Organization, an intergovernmental organization that oversees workers' rights, staged a sit-down strike at its headquarters to protest short-term work contracts for staffers.

== Legacy ==
The sit-down strike was the inspiration for the sit-in, where an organized group of protesters would occupy an area in which they are not wanted by sitting and refuse to leave until their demands are met. Sidney Fine cites the protest form as being echoed and replicated in both the lunch counter sit-ins of the African American civil rights movement of the 1950s and 1960s, and in the university occupations of the 1960s.

== See also ==
- Timeline of labour issues and events
- Pen-down strike

== Bibliography ==
- Adamic, Louis (1938). My America, 1928–1938. New York, London, Harper & brothers. p. 404.
- Ascherson, Neal (1982). The Polish August. Penguin Books. ISBN 9780140059311.
- Brecher, Jeremy (1997). Strike!. Boston MA: South End Press. ISBN 978-0-89608-570-1.
- Brooke, Lindsay (2002). Triumph: A Century of Passion and Power. Saint Paul, Minnesota: Motorbooks. ISBN 978-0-7603-0456-3.
- US Department of Labor, Division of Industrial Relations (May 1940). "Strikes in 1939". Monthly Labor Review.
- US Department of Labor, Division of Industrial Relations (May 1939). "Analysis of Strikes in 1938". Monthly Labor Review.
- Dubofsky, Melvyn (2000). McCartin, Joseph Anthony (ed.). We Shall Be All: A History of the Industrial Workers of the World (abridged ed.). Urbana, Illinois: University of Illinois Press. ISBN 978-0-252-02595-2.
- Fine, Sidney (1965). "The General Motors Sit-Down Strike: A Re-examination". The American Historical Review. 70 (3): 691–713. doi:10.2307/1845938. ISSN 0002-8762. JSTOR 1845938.
- Fine, Sidney (1969). Sit-down: the General Motors Strike of 1936-1937. University of Michigan Press. ISBN 978-0-472-32948-9.
- Frank, Dana (16 September 2002). "Girl strikers occupy chain store, win big: The Detroit Woolworth's Strike of 1937". Three Strikes: Miners, Musicians, Salesgirls, and the Fighting Spirit of Labor's Last Century. Beacon Press. p. 82. ISBN 978-0-8070-5013-2.
- Lydersen, Kari; Tracy, James (12 December 2008). "The Real Audacity of Hope: Republic Windows Workers Stand Their Ground". Dollars & Sense. Archived from the original on 15 April 2024.
- McGerr, Michael (2010). A Fierce Discontent: The Rise and Fall of the Progressive Movement in America. Simon and Schuster. ISBN 9781439136034.
- Meyer, Rachel (2009). "The Rise and Fall of the Sit-Down Strike". In Brenner, A.; Day, B.; Ness, I. (eds.). The Encyclopedia of Strikes in American History. M.E. Sharpe. pp. 204–215. ISBN 978-0-7656-2645-5.
- Mitchum, Robert (14 January 2009). "Republic Windows factory may reopen". Chicago Breaking News. Archived from the original on 28 January 2010.
- Mitzman, Arthur (December 1964). "The French Working Class and the Blum Government (1936–37)". International Review of Social History. 9 (3): 363–390. doi:10.1017/S0020859000002613. ISSN 0020-8590.
- Nelson, Daniel (1974). "The beginning of the sit-down era: The reminiscences of rex murray". Labor History. 15 (1): 89–97. doi:10.1080/00236567408584283. ISSN 0023-656X.
- Nelson, Daniel (1982). "Origins of the sit-down era: Worker militancy and innovation in the rubber industry, 1934–38". Labor History. 23 (2). Informa UK Limited: 198–225. doi:10.1080/00236568208584653. ISSN 0023-656X.
- Nelson, Daniel (1983). "The great Goodyear strike of 1936". Ohio History. 92: 6–36.
- Nelson, Daniel (2014). American Rubber Workers & Organized Labor, 1900–1941. Princeton Legacy Library (Course Book ed.). Princeton, NJ: Princeton University Press. ISBN 978-1-4008-5945-0.
- Pannekoek, Anton (2003). Workers' councils. Oakland, CA: AK Press. ISBN 978-1-902593-56-2.
- Silver, Beverly J. (2003). Forces of labor: workers' movements and globalization since 1870. Cambridge studies in comparative politics. Cambridge: Cambridge University Press. ISBN 978-0-521-81751-6.
- "ILO staff protest halts board meeting". SWI swissinfo.ch. 10 November 2010.
- Torigian, Michael (1999). "The Occupation of the Factories: Paris 1936, Flint 1937" (PDF). Comparative Studies in Society and History. 41 (2). Cambridge University Press (CUP): 324–347. doi:10.1017/s0010417599002108. ISSN 0010-4175. JSTOR 179449. S2CID 144972982.
- Watson, Bruce (2005). Bread and Roses: Mills, Migrants, and the Struggle for the American Dream. New York: Viking. ISBN 978-0-670-03397-3.
- White, Ahmed A. (2010). "The Depression Era Sit-Down Strikes and the Limits of Liberal Labor Law". Seton Hall Law Review. 40 (1): 1–82.
