= George Burdon =

George Burdon (April 30, 1909 – June 17, 1972) was an American labor union leader. Born in Los Angeles, Burdon was an early member of the United Rubber Workers of America. In 1937, he was the founding president of a local at the Goodyear factory in Long Beach, California. In 1938, he began working part-time for the International Union, and in 1941, he became the union's education director for the West Coast. During World War II, he served in the United States Navy. He then held various union posts before becoming international organizational director in 1959, and then in 1960, he was elected as president of the union.

Although Burdon was easily re-elected in 1962 and 1964, in 1966, he faced a strong challenge from Peter Bommarito for the presidency. Instead, he chose to stand down and found work with the United States Department of Labor's Manpower Administration. From 1965 to 1967, he also served as a vice-president of the AFL-CIO.

Trade union offices
Preceded by L. S. Buckmaster	President of the United Rubber Workers of America; 1960–1966	Succeeded by Peter Bommarito
