= United Rubber, Cork, Linoleum and Plastic Workers of America =

- Abbreviation: URW
- Merged into: United Steel Workers of America
- Formation: 1935
- Dissolved: 1995
- Type: Trade union
- Headquarters: Akron, Ohio, US
- Locations: Canada; United States
- Affiliations: AFL-CIO
- Formerly called: United Rubber Workers of America

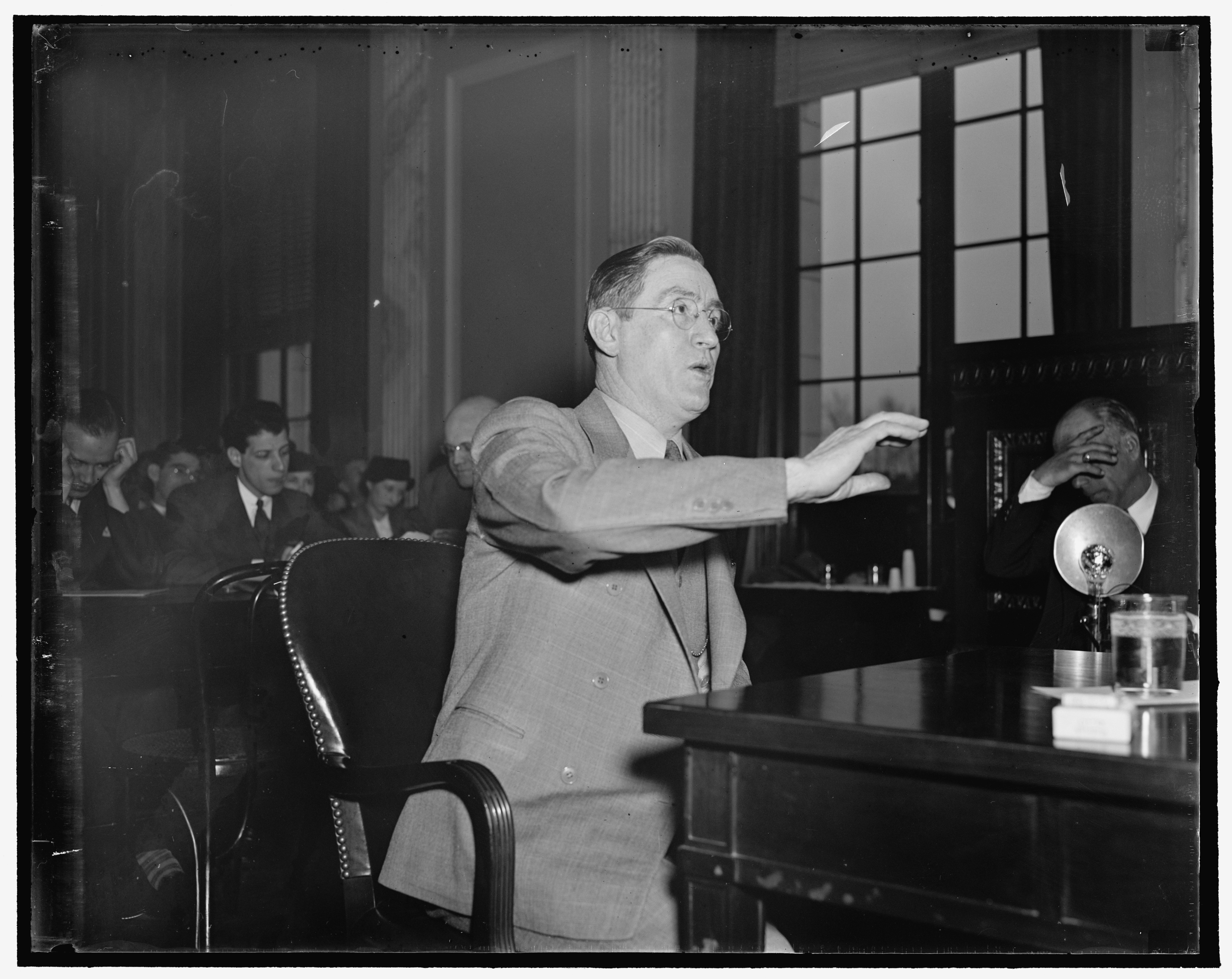
Testifying before the Lafollette Civil Liberties Committee in 1937, John H. Dalrymple, President of the United Rubber Workers of America, related details of a "beating up" administered to him in Gadsden, Alabama, the previous June which resulted in his hopitalization for several weeks with concussion of the brain

The United Rubber, Cork, Linoleum and Plastic Workers of America (URW) was a labor union representing workers involved in manufacturing using specific materials in the United States and Canada.

The union was founded in 1935 as the United Rubber Workers of America and was chartered by the American Federation of Labor (AFL) on September 12. It aligned itself with the Congress of Industrial Organizations (CIO), and as a result, was suspended by the AFL in 1936 and expelled in 1938. In 1937, it was chartered by the CIO, and by 1953, it had grown to become the federation's sixth-largest affiliate, with 190,000 members.

In 1955, the URW affiliated to the new AFL-CIO, and by 1980, its membership had increased slightly, to 199,990. On July 2, 1995, it merged into the United Steelworkers of America.

== Presidents ==
1935: Sherman Dalrymple
1945: L. S. Buckmaster
1960: George Burdon
1966: Peter Bommarito
1981: Mike Stone
1990: Kenneth L. Coss

== See also ==
- 1936 Akron rubber strike
- 1943 Akron rubber strike
