= Geneva, Indiana =

- Town
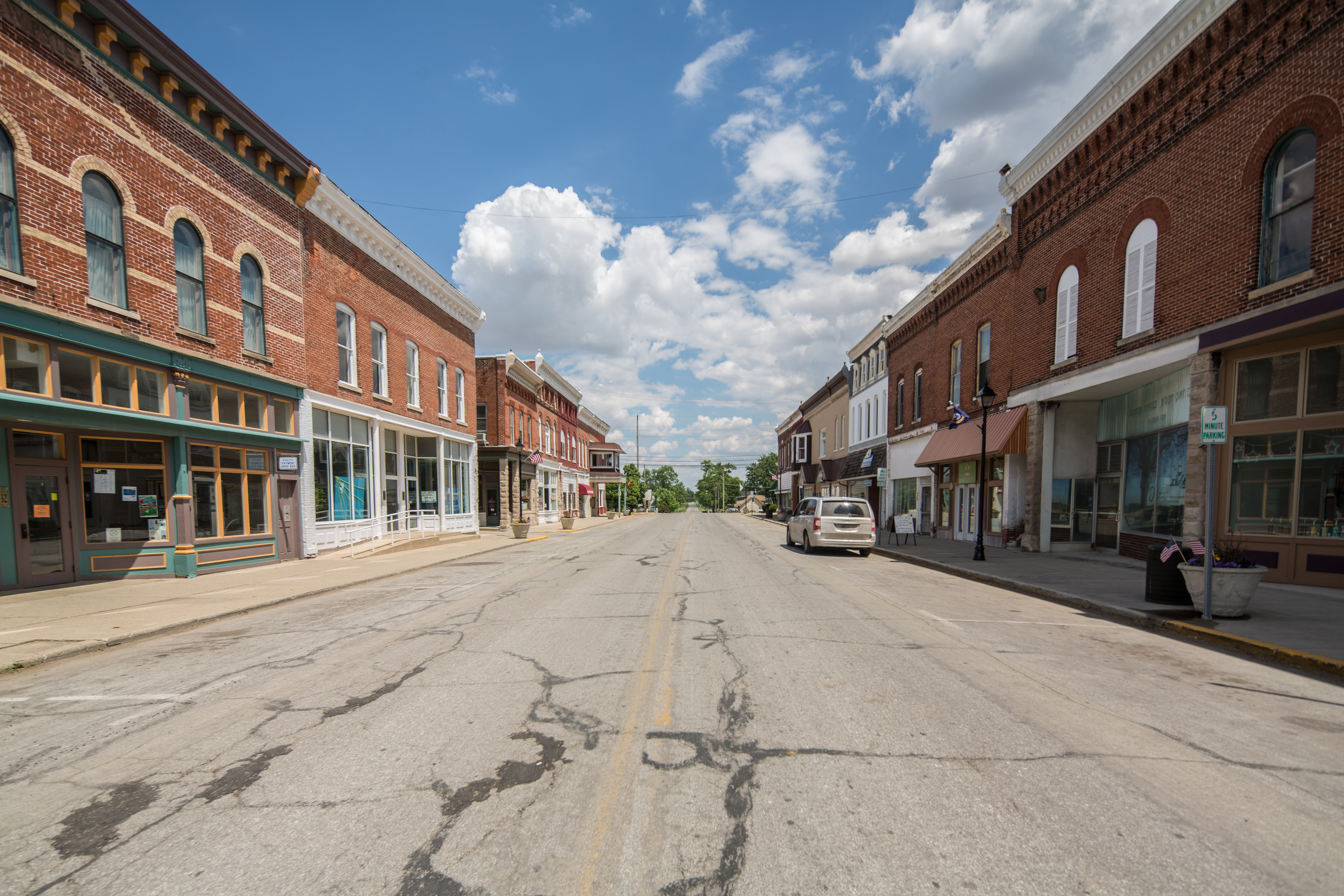

- Location of Geneva in Adams County, Indiana.
- Coordinates: 40°35′51″N 84°57′25″W
- Country: United States
- State: Indiana
- County: Adams
- Township: Wabash
- Established: 1871
- Incorporated: 1874

Area
  - Total: 1.24 sq mi (3.22 km^{2})
  - Land: 1.10 sq mi (2.86 km^{2})
  - Water: 0.14 sq mi (0.36 km^{2})
- Elevation: 850 ft (260 m)

Population (2020)
  - Total: 1,257
  - Density: 1,139.0/sq mi (439.76/km^{2})
- Time zone: UTC-5 (EST)
  - Summer (DST): UTC-4 (EDT)
- ZIP code: 46740
- Area code: 260
- FIPS code: 18-27216
- GNIS feature ID: 2396956
- Website: townofgeneva.org

Geneva is a town in Wabash Township, Adams County, Indiana. The population was 1,257 at the time of the 2020 census. Geneva is the location of the Limberlost Cabin, the home of writer and naturalist Gene Stratton-Porter from 1895 to 1913.

== History ==
Geneva had its start in 1871 when the rival towns of Alexander and Buffalo merged. It was named after Geneva, in Switzerland. The first post office in Geneva was established in 1872. Geneva incorporated as a town in early 1874.

The Town of Geneva benefited greatly from the Indiana Gas Boom of the late 19th and early 20th centuries. Oil was found near Geneva and production began in 1892. This brought many new settlers to the area and skyrocketed local land prices. At its height in November 1895, one company, the Buckeye Pipe Line Company, had 160 oil wells in the Geneva field producing 24,362 barrels a month. Production fell off after 1907. Charles D. Porter and his wife, Gene Stratton-Porter, who lived in Geneva from 1886 to 1913, owned roughly 30 oil wells in the area, and used the proceeds to build Limberlost Cabin in 1895.

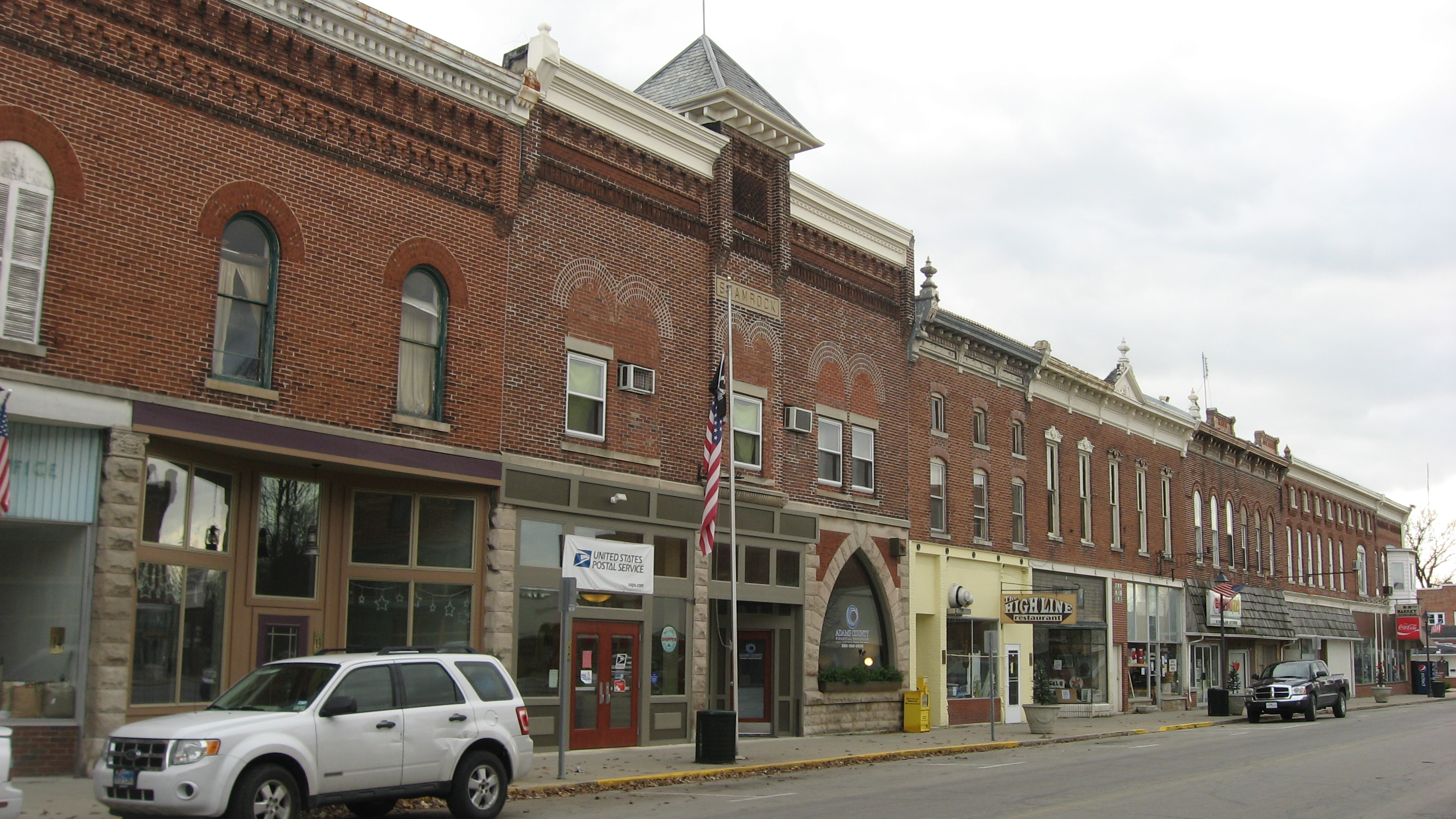
Businesses in Geneva's downtown historic district

== Geography ==
According to the 2010 census, Geneva has a total area of 1.23 square miles (3.19 km^{2}), of which 1.09 square miles (2.82 km^{2}) (or 88.62%) is land and 0.14 square miles (0.36 km^{2}) (or 11.38%) is water.

== Demographics ==
Historical population
Census	Pop.	Note	%±
1880	467		—
1890	748		60.2%
1900	1,076		43.9%
1910	1,140		5.9%
1920	879		−22.9%
1930	895		1.8%
1940	966		7.9%
1950	999		3.4%
1960	1,053		5.4%
1970	1,100		4.5%
1980	1,430		30.0%
1990	1,280		−10.5%
2000	1,368		6.9%
2010	1,293		−5.5%
2020	1,257		−2.8%
U.S. Decennial Census

=== 2020 census ===
As of the 2020 census, Geneva had a population of 1,257. The median age was 45.2 years. 20.7% of residents were under the age of 18 and 21.8% of residents were 65 years of age or older. For every 100 females there were 101.4 males, and for every 100 females age 18 and over there were 98.2 males age 18 and over.

0.0% of residents lived in urban areas, while 100.0% lived in rural areas.

There were 579 households in Geneva, of which 20.9% had children under the age of 18 living in them. Of all households, 40.2% were married-couple households, 23.7% were households with a male householder and no spouse or partner present, and 29.4% were households with a female householder and no spouse or partner present. About 40.1% of all households were made up of individuals and 17.5% had someone living alone who was 65 years of age or older.

There were 637 housing units, of which 9.1% were vacant. The homeowner vacancy rate was 1.0% and the rental vacancy rate was 11.6%.

Racial composition as of the 2020 census
Race	Number	Percent
White	1,148	91.3%
Black or African American	6	0.5%
American Indian and Alaska Native	3	0.2%
Asian	3	0.2%
Native Hawaiian and Other Pacific Islander	0	0.0%
Some other race	43	3.4%
Two or more races	54	4.3%
Hispanic or Latino (of any race)	107	8.5%

=== 2010 census ===
As of the census of 2010, there were 1,293 people, 570 households, and 349 families living in the town. The population density was 1,186.2 inhabitants per square mile (458.0/km^{2}). There were 627 housing units at an average density of 575.2 per square mile (222.1/km^{2}). The racial makeup of the town was 94.6% White, 0.6% African American, 0.2% Native American, 0.2% Asian, 3.2% from other races, and 1.2% from two or more races. Hispanic or Latino of any race were 5.4% of the population.

There were 570 households, of which 28.8% had children under the age of 18 living with them, 45.3% were married couples living together, 11.1% had a female householder with no husband present, 4.9% had a male householder with no wife present, and 38.8% were non-families. 34.6% of all households were made up of individuals, and 14.1% had someone living alone who was 65 years of age or older. The average household size was 2.27 and the average family size was 2.91.

The median age in the town was 41.1 years. 23.9% of residents were under the age of 18; 6.7% were between the ages of 18 and 24; 23.3% were from 25 to 44; 28.3% were from 45 to 64; and 18% were 65 years of age or older. The gender makeup of the town was 48.4% male and 51.6% female.

=== 2000 census ===
As of the census of 2000, there were 1,368 people, 584 households, and 369 families living in the town. The population density was 1,192.1 inhabitants per square mile (460.3/km^{2}). There were 621 housing units at an average density of 541.1 per square mile (208.9/km^{2}). The racial makeup of the town was 98.25% White, 0.37% African American, 0.22% Asian, 0.29% from other races, and 0.88% from two or more races. Hispanic or Latino of any race were 1.10% of the population.

There were 584 households, out of which 29.6% had children under the age of 18 living with them, 50.2% were married couples living together, 9.8% had a female householder with no husband present, and 36.8% were non-families. 30.8% of all households were made up of individuals, and 15.9% had someone living alone who was 65 years of age or older. The average household size was 2.34 and the average family size was 2.96.

In the town, the population was spread out, with 24.7% under the age of 18, 10.2% from 18 to 24, 26.6% from 25 to 44, 23.8% from 45 to 64, and 14.8% who were 65 years of age or older. The median age was 36 years. For every 100 females, there were 94.0 males. For every 100 females age 18 and over, there were 88.6 males.

The median income for a household in the town was $33,942, and the median income for a family was $41,645. Males had a median income of $31,895 versus $21,552 for females. The per capita income for the town was $16,435. About 9.5% of families and 11.9% of the population were below the poverty line, including 23.0% of those under age 18 and 12.2% of those age 65 or over.

== Education ==
Geneva has a public library, a branch of the Adams Public Library System. Geneva is located in the South Adams Schools District.

== Notable people ==
- L. S. Buckmaster (1894–1967), labor union leader
- Robert O. Fink, classics professor
- Gene Stratton-Porter (1863–1924), best-selling author, nature photographer, naturalist, and silent movie-era producer

== Notable structures ==
- Limberlost Cabin, completed in 1895, was the home Gene Stratton-Porter shared with her husband, Charles Porter, and their daughter, Jeannette (Geneva HS '05). The property was listed on the National Register of Historic Places in 1974. Designated as the Limberlost State Historic Site, it is operated by the Indiana State Museum and Historic Sites and open to the public.
