= Peter Bommarito =

Peter Bommarito (May 17, 1915 – September 25, 1989) was an American labor union leader.

Born in Detroit, Bommarito became a machinist at the United States Rubber Company in Akron, Ohio, and in 1940 he joined the United Rubber, Cork, Linoleum and Plastic Workers of America union. In 1942, he joined the United States Marine Corps, and he served in the Pacific during World War II.

After the war, Bommarito returned to the Rubber Company, and in 1948 he was elected as treasurer of his local union, rising to become its president in 1957. In 1960, he was elected as an international vice-president of the union, then in 1966 he was elected as its president. As leader of the union, he led a major strike in 1976, which led to a 36% increase in wages. He later centralized bargaining across the four largest rubber companies, something which proved highly controversial with members, but led to improved pay and conditions. However, the union lost members during his presidency, due to factory closures.

Bommarito served as a vice-president and executive council member of the AFL-CIO from 1969. He also served on the Committee for National Health Insurance, and on the board of the Salvation Army. He retired in 1981.

Trade union offices
Preceded by George Burdon	President of the United Rubber, Cork, Linoleum and Plastic Workers of America; 1966–1981	Succeeded by Mike Stone
Preceded by Frederick O'Neal; Louis Stulberg	AFL-CIO delegate to the Trades Union Congress; 1973; With: Martin Ward	Succeeded by Max Greenberg; James Housewright
