= L. S. Buckmaster =

American trade unionist (1894–1967)

Leland Stanford Buckmaster (March 30, 1894 – January 2, 1967) was an American trade unionist.

Born in Geneva, Indiana, Buckmaster studied at Tri-State College, before becoming a schoolteacher. He served in the United States Army during World War I, then after the war began working for the Firestone Tire and Rubber Company as a tin finisher. He joined what became the United Rubber Workers of America in 1933, and began working full-time for the union in 1937.

In 1941, Buckmaster was elected as a vice-president of the United Rubber Workers, then in 1945, he was elected as its president. He opposed communism, and sought to expel communists from the union. He was removed from office by the executive board in 1949, on a charge of malfeasance, but the union's convention later in the year voted to reinstate him.

Buckmaster became a vice president of the Congress of Industrial Organizations, and took a leading role in merging it with the American Federation of Labor. This was achieved in 1955, and he became a vice-president of the new AFL-CIO. He retired as union president in 1960, and from the federation in 1962.

Trade union offices
Preceded by Sherman Dalrymple	President of the United Rubber Workers of America; 1945–1960	Succeeded by George Burdon
