= 1936 Akron rubber strike =

Labor action in Ohio, United States

The Akron rubber strike of 1936 was a strike by workers against rubber factory owners in Akron, Ohio.

During the late nineteenth and twentieth centuries, rubber factory workers, including those who worked for the three major rubber factories in Akron, OH, faced poor working conditions, low wages, and close to no benefits. The year 1936 was not only within this period in which rubber factory workers struggled with poor conditions and low wages, but also coincided with the period of the Great Depression in the United States, as well as the passing of the National Labor Relations Act. The combination of all these conditions, as well as many other conditions, caused the founding of the United Rubber Workers in 1935, and the major picket strike of February and March 1936.

== Unions ==
=== United Rubber Council ===
In 1933, the same year the National Recovery Administration was established by President Franklin D. Roosevelt, the American Federation of Labor (AFL) created a United Rubber Council (URC) to be a nationwide union for the industry. But workers at many individual factories had already organized federal local unions, and so recruitment was slow. So the AFL printed 50,000 leaflets and distributed them to the many rubber factories in Akron, Ohio, inviting workers to a recruiting meeting. About 5,000 workers showed up to hear the AFL's Paul Smith, and eventually about 50,000 workers joined the URC. But during a rubber industry strike in 1934 and 1935, the URC's elected leadership reached terms with factory management that many striking workers felt far too unfavorable. The union's membership plummeted to below 5,000 members.

=== United Rubber Workers ===
In its wake, the United Rubber Workers (URW) union was founded as the new industry-wide union. The AFL's William Green threatened to pull AFL funding from rubber-industry unions unless the URW elected as president the AFL's Coleman Claherty, who had been directing AFL activity in Akron since 1933. The rubber workers rejected Claherty, a boilermaker by trade, and elected instead Sherman Dalrymple, president of the B.F. Goodrich factory's local union. So the AFL ceased funding the rubber-industry union, after making one donation of $1,000 cash and passing along some URC assets: office furniture, equipment, and about $1,800 in a URC bank account. The URW eventually affiliated with the Congress of Industrial Organizations (CIO), and solidified itself as the prominent industry-wide union for rubber workers through the remainder of the Great Depression and until World War II. The URW is also one of the first few unions in the CIO that was founded without financial help from an outside organization.

The passage of the 1935 National Labor Relations Act, which guaranteed the right to organize and form unions, helped the CIO form many unions within different industries. But it did not require employers to recognize and cooperate with unions. Goodyear's management, led by Paul Litchfield, did not wish to recognize the URW during negotiations.

=== Goodyear Industrial Assembly ===
The Goodyear Industrial Assembly, founded in 1919, was a local union for employees of the Goodyear Tire plant. Many of the rubber factories had local unions in place to allow the workers and management of individual factories to bargain, and (during this time period) these local unions often existed at the same time as industry-wide unions. Because the Goodyear factory was more than twice the size of the next largest employer, the actions between the workers and management at the Goodyear factory had an effect on how the rest of the industry acted.

Goodyear's management and the leadership of the local union were able to cooperate and bargain until late 1935. During the later stages of 1935, Goodyear's management, led by Paul Litchfield, introduced plans to reduce hourly wages, while at the same time moving from six hour shifts to eight hour shifts for its employees. The local union voiced its displeasure to management, but management was adamant on going through with the proposed changes, regardless of how the local union felt. Because the local union was now unable to negotiate with management, its perceived bargaining power decreased in the eyes of the workers, causing the union's support to decrease, and workers began to look elsewhere for union support (with many workers eventually joining the URW).

== Sit-down strikes ==
The sit-down strike was a type of strike that the rubber factory workers used very frequently both before and after the large picket strike of February–March 1936. The sit-down strike is when factory workers, who are currently working on the assembly line, sit down at their assembly line positions to stop production at their point in the production process. The stoppage of production in one department will cause the next department in the process to stop because that department will have no new products or batches to work with. Because one department decides to sit down, it causes the rest of an assembly line to cease production.

The workers in the rubber industry got the idea of using the sit-down strike from a strike that occurred at a baseball game that was played between union members from different factories. The players, who were union members, disliked an umpire who was not a union member, so the players decided that they would rather sit down on the field than play in a game that would be umpired by someone who was not a member of their union. The sit-down strikes in Akron, OH are considered to be some of the earliest origins of the sit-down strike, even earlier than the Flint sit-down strike of 1936-1937.

The sit-down strike was used frequently by the rubber workers because of a few reasons. The most important reason for the sit-down strike being used is that it does not allow the factory's management to hire scab workers to continue production, because the sitting workers are occupying the space necessary for the work to be done. Another major reason as to why the sit-down strike was frequently used by the rubber workers was due to management's inability to use force in order to get the striking workers out of the way. Factory management would rarely use force to drive out striking employees because of the fear of damaging expensive equipment used in the manufacturing process. These reasons also allowed the sit-down strike to be an effective tool for the workers.

== Picket strike of February–March 1936 ==
The large picket strike of February–March 1936 began in the Goodyear Tire factory, and then quickly spread to the rest of the rubber factories in Akron, Ohio.

Late during 1935, the management of the Goodyear plant, which was by far the largest employer of rubber workers in the industry, introduced a plan for the reduction of hourly wages for workers as well as a move from six-hour shifts to eight-hour shifts. The reason for management's plan was to save money on labor. The move to eight-hour shifts from six-hour shifts would cause significant layoffs of around 1,200 workers, because with six-hour shifts, four shifts of workers would be employed compared to three shifts of workers being employed under eight-hour shifts. Eventually, Goodyear's management decided to go back to six-hour shifts because of the displeasure voiced by workers.

During the early stages of 1936, shortly after Goodyear's management decided to go back to the six-hour shifts for its employees, Goodyear was forced to lay off around 700 workers due to decreases in tire sales. This round of layoffs was the final event between management and workers that caused the workers to start the picket strike on February 14, 1936.

Throughout the strike, there were as many as 10,000 workers, which included people from all trades in the city of Akron, that picketed around the many gates to the Goodyear factory. The leaders of the strike were able to maintain strong morale among the striking workers during the strike largely due to the playing of music. There are a couple of known attempts to break the picket strike by using force, the first of which was by the police. The sheriff's force consisted of around 150 deputies as the force approached the striking workers. At the last possible second, the sheriff's force decided against attempting to break up the striking workers due to the number of people that they would be confronting.

The second known attempt to break the strike by using force was by a Law and Order League. This group was financially funded by Goodyear and was managed by a former mayor of Akron. The group consisted of approximately 5,200 members that were fully prepared to attack the striking workers if told to do so. As a way of avoiding a violent confrontation, the Summit County Central Labor Council was able to convince the Law and Order League to not attack the striking workers.

During the time of the picket strike, Goodyear's management and the URW were busy negotiating terms that would allow for the workers to go back to the factories and continue production. Goodyear's management refused to formally sign any agreements between the two sides, causing the negotiation process to potentially take longer than it should have. By the end of the negotiating process, Goodyear had capitulated on many of the major demands by the workers. These demands included layoffs by seniority, six-hour work shifts, and regular meetings between management and union representatives. The workers came away from the strike largely victorious, and their excitement was shown by a march of 5,000 delighted workers throughout the streets of Akron following the announcement that the strike was over.

Even though the strike had halted production for about a month, Goodyear had three months of inventory built up prior to the beginning of the strike, so the company did not lose any potential sales revenue by not being able to meet demand. Also, despite the length and size of the strike, there were no deaths and injuries were practically nonexistent.

== See also ==
- 1943 Akron rubber strike
