= Mike Stone (unionist) =

Milan "Mike" Stone (June 11, 1927 – March 3, 2018) was an American labor union leader.

Born in Rock Falls, Wisconsin, Stone served in the United States Navy during World War II. After the war, he found work at the Uniroyal Tire Plant in Eau Claire, Wisconsin, and joined the United Rubber, Cork, Linoleum and Plastic Workers of America union. He was soon elected as a shop steward. He next became a full-time field representative for the union, then a district director, and eventually vice-president of the union.

In 1981, Stone was elected as the union's president. In 1985, he additionally won election as a vice-president of the AFL-CIO. The decade proved a tough time for the union, with numerous tire plants closing. Stone argued that union members should become more productive, in order that he could justify asking for pay increases and improvements to benefits, a stance which was unpopular with many in the union. In 1990, he was defeated for re-election by the union's secretary-treasurer, Ken Coss. Stone instead became an international representative for the union, covering locals around Wisconsin. He took early retirement in 1993.

Trade union offices
| Preceded by Peter Bommarito | President of the United Rubber, Cork, Linoleum and Plastic Workers of America; 1981–1990 | Succeeded by Ken Coss |
