= Robert O. Fink =

American papyrologist (1905–1988)

Robert Fink
- Born: Robert Orwill Fink; November 4, 1905; Geneva, Indiana, U.S.
- Died: December 17, 1988 (aged 83); Mount Vernon, Ohio, U.S.

Academic background
- Education: Indiana University (AB); Cornell University (MA); Yale University (PhD)

Academic work
- Discipline: Classics
- Sub-discipline: Papyrology
- Institutions: Yale University; Russell Sage College; Beloit College; Kenyon College; University at Albany, SUNY

Robert Orwill Fink (November 4, 1905 – December 17, 1988) was an American papyrologist with a special interest in Roman military papyri.

== Early life and education ==
Fink was born in Geneva, Indiana. He attended Indiana University, where he earned his Bachelor of Arts degree in 1930. After completing a Master of Arts degree at Cornell University in 1931, he went on to Yale University, where he studied under Michael Rostovtzeff, under whose direction he completed his Ph.D. in 1934 with a thesis on "Roman military accounts and records."

== Career ==
In 1931, Fink was appointed instructor in classics at Yale University and remained there until 1941, when he was appointed assistant professor of classics at Russell Sage College. In 1942, he accepted an appointment at Beloit College, where he was promoted to associate professor. In 1946, he moved to Kenyon College, where he rose to the rank of professor of classics.

In 1958, Kenyon College named him Euman Dempsey Professor of Classics. While at Kenyon College, he was named a Fulbright Scholar for research in Italy in 1956–1957 and the American Council of Learned Societies awarded him a Research Fellowship in 1963–1964. In 1966, the University at Albany, SUNY appointed him professor of classics. Upon his retirement in 1976 he returned to his former residence in Gambier, Ohio near Kenyon College.

== Personal life ==
Fink married Ruth Kuersteiner on June 11, 1935.

== Published works ==
Books

- The Feriale Duranum with A. S. Hoey and Walter Fifield Snyder, (YCS, 1940)
- The Excavations at Dura-Europas. Final Report V, Part 1: The Parchments and Papyri with C. B. Wells and J. F. Gilliam. (1959)
- Roman Military Records on Papyrus (APA Monograph, no. 26, 1971).

Articles

- "Jerash in the First century A.D.," JRS, 23 (1933), pp. 109–124.
- "Lucius Seius Caesar", Socer Augusti, AJP, 60 (1939), pp. 326–332.
- "The Sponsalia of Classiarius: A Reinterpretation of P. Mich. Inv. 4703, TAPA, 72 (1941), pp. 109–124.
- "Mommsen's Pridianum B.G.U. 696", AJP, 63 (1942), pp. 61–71.
- "A Fragment of Roman Military Papyrus at Princeton", TAPA, 84 (1945), pp. 271–278.
- "The Cohors XX Palmyrenorum, a Cohors Equitata Milaria", TAPA, 78 (1947), pp. 159–170.
- "Infinitives Don't Have Tense", The Classical Journal, 48 (1952–53), pp. 34–36.
- "Centuria Rufi, Centuria Rufiana, and the Ranking of Centuries", TAPA, 84 (1953), pp. 210–215.
- "Catullus 64, 109", AJP, 84 (1963), pp. 72–74.
- "M. Aurelius Atho Marcellus", AJP, 88 (1967), pp. 84–85.
- "A Long Vowel before Final M in Latin?", AJP, 90 (1969), pp. 444–452.
