= Pen-down strike =

Form of protest where employees refuse to perform their duties

A pen-down strike (sometimes known as a tool-down strike or dropping pen), is a form of nonviolent strike action or a peaceful protest in which an organized group of workers, generally in the private or public sector, partially attend their offices but refuse to work or be involved in office management. Pen-down strikes usually stem from employees stopping work in protest against their employers failing to meet their professional or contractual obligations. In government departments, it is usually observed by the non-gazetted employees in a civil disobedience manner by the workers in an attempt to reach to a consensus.

In some countries, a pen-down strike may not be recognized as a violation of law. In India, pen-down is mentioned in the Industrial Disputes Act, 1947 which defines it as a "labour action". Since it is a symbolic or a nonviolent protest, it achieves goals without being involved in a direct action and demonstration. Pen-down strike was popularized by the government or private employees in India and Pakistan where workers widely observe pen down strikes in order to fulfill their claims or requirements associated with their job or emotions. Sometimes, a pen-down strike is observed in solidarity with other employees working in relevant field when there has been any discrimination or unlawful activity towards employees.

Pen-down strikes are also seen at public hospitals where doctors hold a partial protest and refuse medical treatment to patients, excluding in times of life-threatening situations. While it is a nonviolent protest or strike, employees continue to work in emergency departments and provide emergency medicine to patients.

== See also ==
- Hunger strike
- Sitdown strike
