= 1943 Akron rubber strike =

Labor strike in Ohio, United States

- Date: May 21, 1943 – May 26, 1943
- Location: Akron, Ohio

Number
49,300 workers	

The 1943 rubber strike was a five-day strike from May 21 to 26 of nearly 50,000 rubber workers affiliated with the United Rubber Workers of America in U.S. state of Ohio. Centered on the city of Akron, 49,300 workers at the Firestone, General, Goodrich, and Goodyear companies went on strike. The strike contravened the "no-strike pledge" given by leaders of the Congress of Industrial Organizations to the government at the outbreak of World War II in support of the war effort. On May 26, President Franklin D. Roosevelt sent union leaders a telegram describing the strike as "a defiance of the War Labor Board, a challenge to Government by law, and a blow against the effective prosecution of the war." Strikers returned to work the following day.

== See also ==
- 1936 Akron rubber strike
