= Feriale Duranum =

Historical calendar of religious observances

The Feriale Duranum is a calendar of religious observances for a Roman military garrison at Dura-Europos on the Euphrates, Roman Syria, under the reign of Severus Alexander (224–235 AD).

== History and description ==
The small papyrus roll was discovered among the documents of an auxiliary cohort, the Cohors XX Palmyrenorum (Twentieth Cohort of Palmyrenes), in the Temple of Azzanathkona. The calendar, written in Latin, is arranged in four columns, with some gaps. It offers important evidence for the religious life of the Roman military and the role of Imperial cult in promoting loyalty to the Roman emperor, and for the coexistence of Roman state religion and local religious traditions.

Festivals named include Quinquatria (a purification of arms), the birthday of Rome, Neptunalia and two Rosaliae at which the military standards were adorned with roses. The calendar prescribes sacrifices for deities of traditional Roman religion such as the Capitoline Triad of Jupiter, Juno, and Minerva, as well as Mars and Vesta. About twenty members of the imperial family are honored as divi, divinized mortals, including six women and Germanicus, who was never an emperor. Twenty-seven of the forty-three entries that remain legible pertain to Imperial cult. No Eastern mystery religions, which were widely celebrated in the Empire during this period, nor local cults are recorded as an official observance of the army, but the feriale was found in the temple with a dipinto depicting a Roman officer offering incense to the local deity Iarḥibol, and Romans, including a standard-bearer with the cohort's vexillum, standing before the altar of the Syrian gods Iarḥibol, Aglibol and Arṣu. It has also been argued that the three gods represent the emperors Pupienus, Balbinus, and Gordian III. A copy of the calendar may have been issued to each unit throughout the Empire to further military cohesion as well as Roman identity among troops from other cultures.

The cache of documents was discovered by a team of archaeologists from Yale University working at Dura-Europos in 1931–32. It was first published by R. O. Fink, A. S. Hooey, and Walter Fifield Snyder (1940), "The Feriale Duranum," Yale Classical Studies 7: 1–222.

== Partial list of festivals ==
In 2011, a facsimile of the partial document was part of the Dura-Europos exhibition at Boston College, and it contained the following translation:

- March 19, Quinquatria, a supplication; until March 23, supplications
- April 4, for the birthday of Antonius Magnus, an ox
- April 9, for the accession of the deified Pius Severus, an ox
- April 11, for the birthday of Pius Severus, an ox
- April 21, for the birthday of the Eternal City of Rome, a cow
- April 26, for the birthday of Marcus Antoninus, an ox
- May 7, for the birthday of the deified Julia Maesa, a supplication
- May 10 (?), for the Rose-festival of the Standards, a supplication
- May 12, for the circus-races in honor of Mars, to Mars Ultor, a bull
- May 21, because the deified Pius Severus was saluted as "imperator"
- May 24, for the birthday of Germanicus Caesar, a supplication
- May 31, for the Rose-festival of the Standards, a supplication
- June 9, for the Vestalia, to Vesta Mater, a supplication
- June 26, because our lord Marcus Aurelius Severus Alexander was named Caesar, a bull
- July 1, because our lord Marcus Aurelius Severus Alexander our Augustus was designated consul for the first time, a supplication
- July 4, for the birthday of the deified Matidia, a supplication
- July 10, for the succession of the deified Antoninus Pius, an ox
- July 12, for the birthday of the deified Julius, an ox
- July 23, for the day of the Neptunalia, a supplication and a sacrifice
- Aug 1, for the birthday of the deified Claudius and the deified Pertinax, an ox and an ox
- Aug 5, for the circus-races in honor of Salus, a cow.
- Aug [14-29], for the birthday of Mamaea Augusta, mother of Augustus, a cow
- Aug [15-30], for the birthday of the deified Marciana, a supplication

== Gallery of those named ==
=== Emperors ===
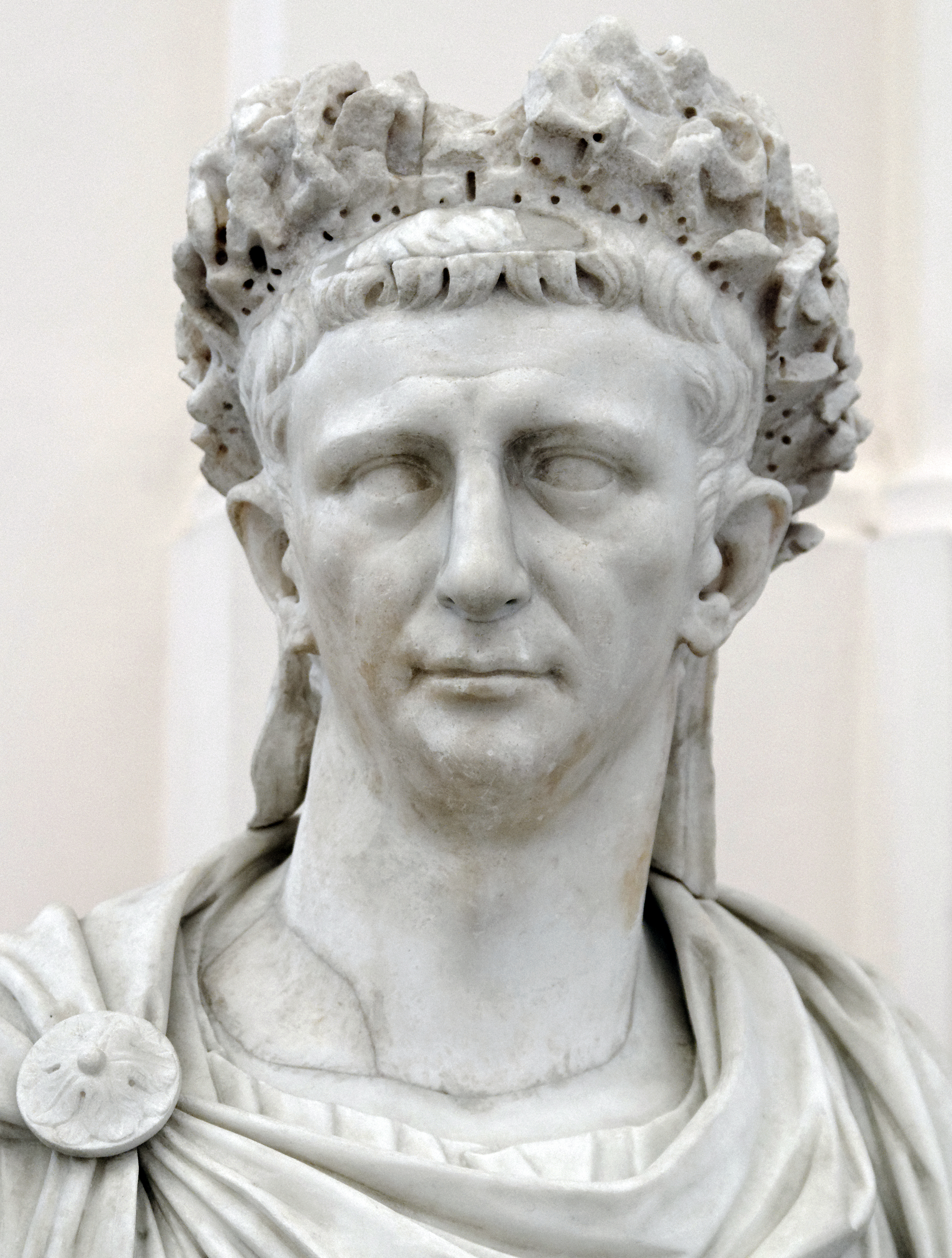
Claudius

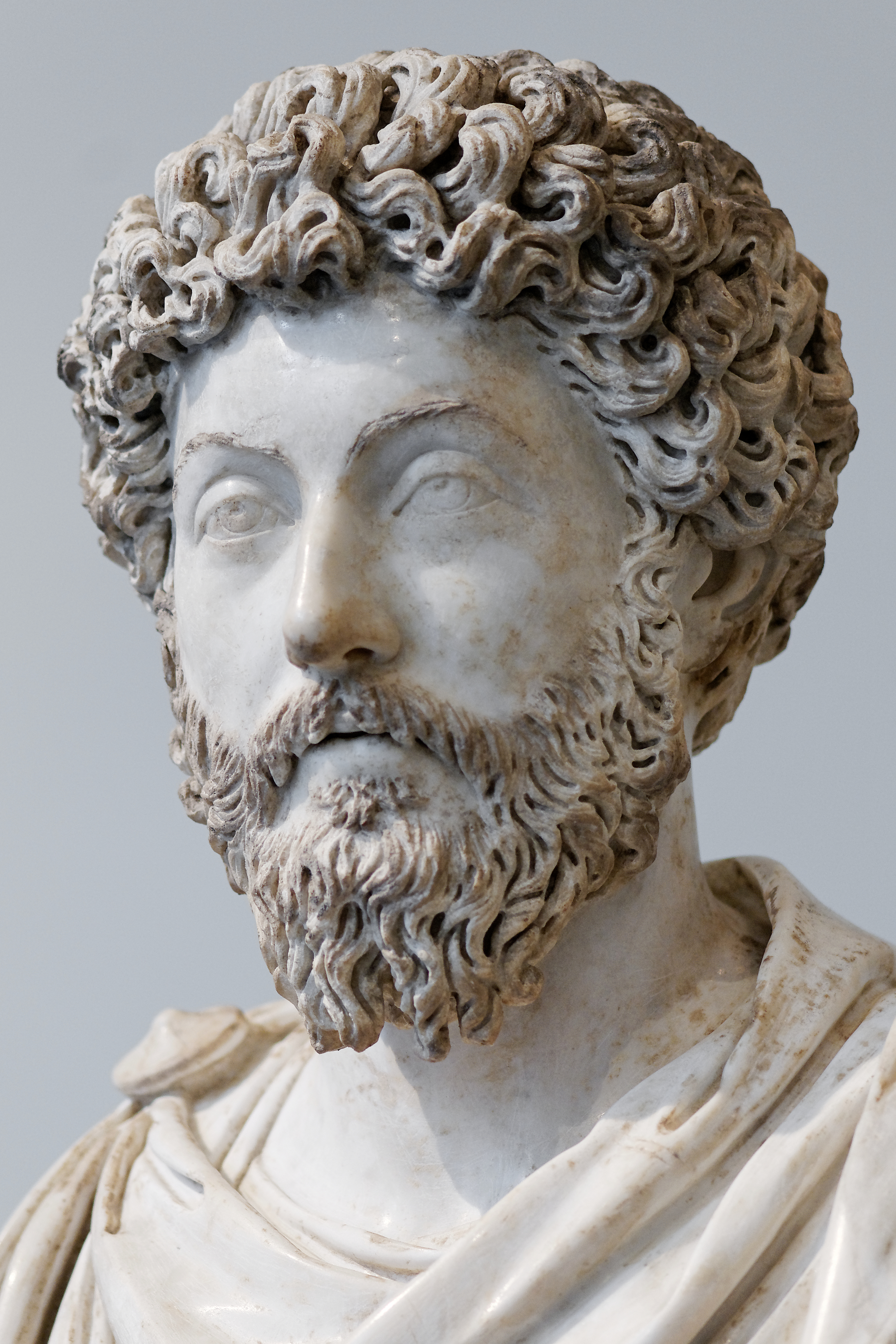
Marcus Aurelius

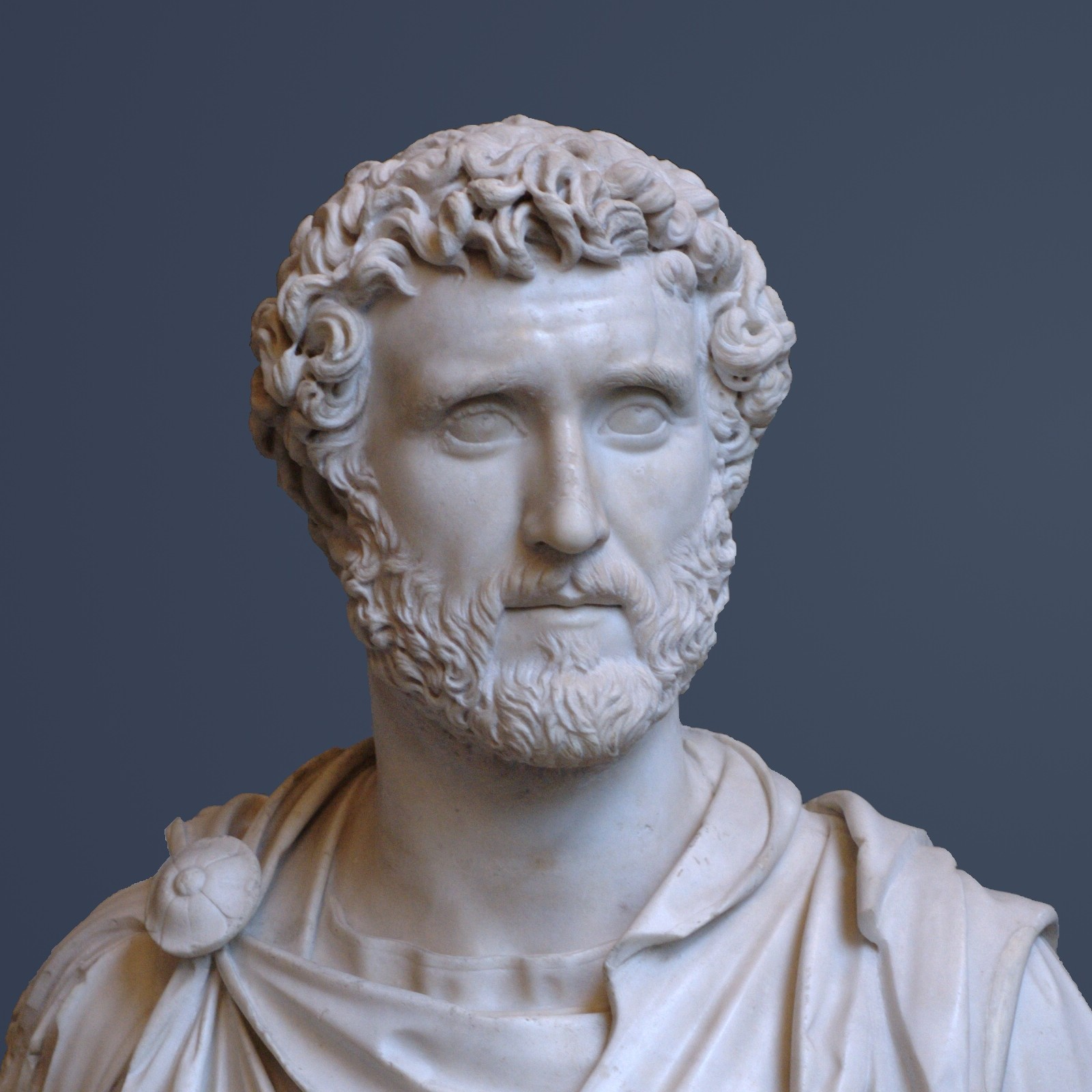
Antoninus Pius

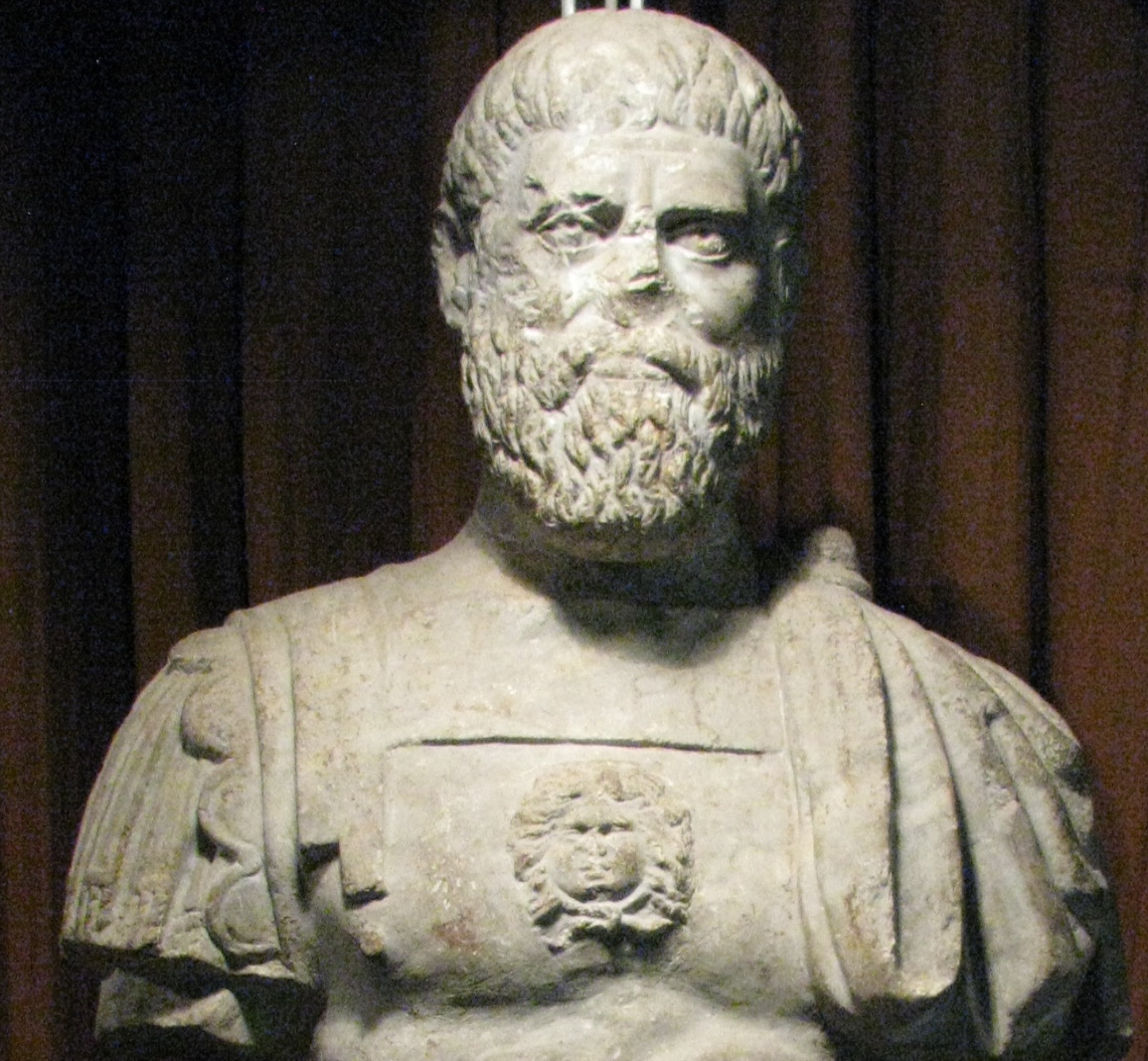
Pertinax

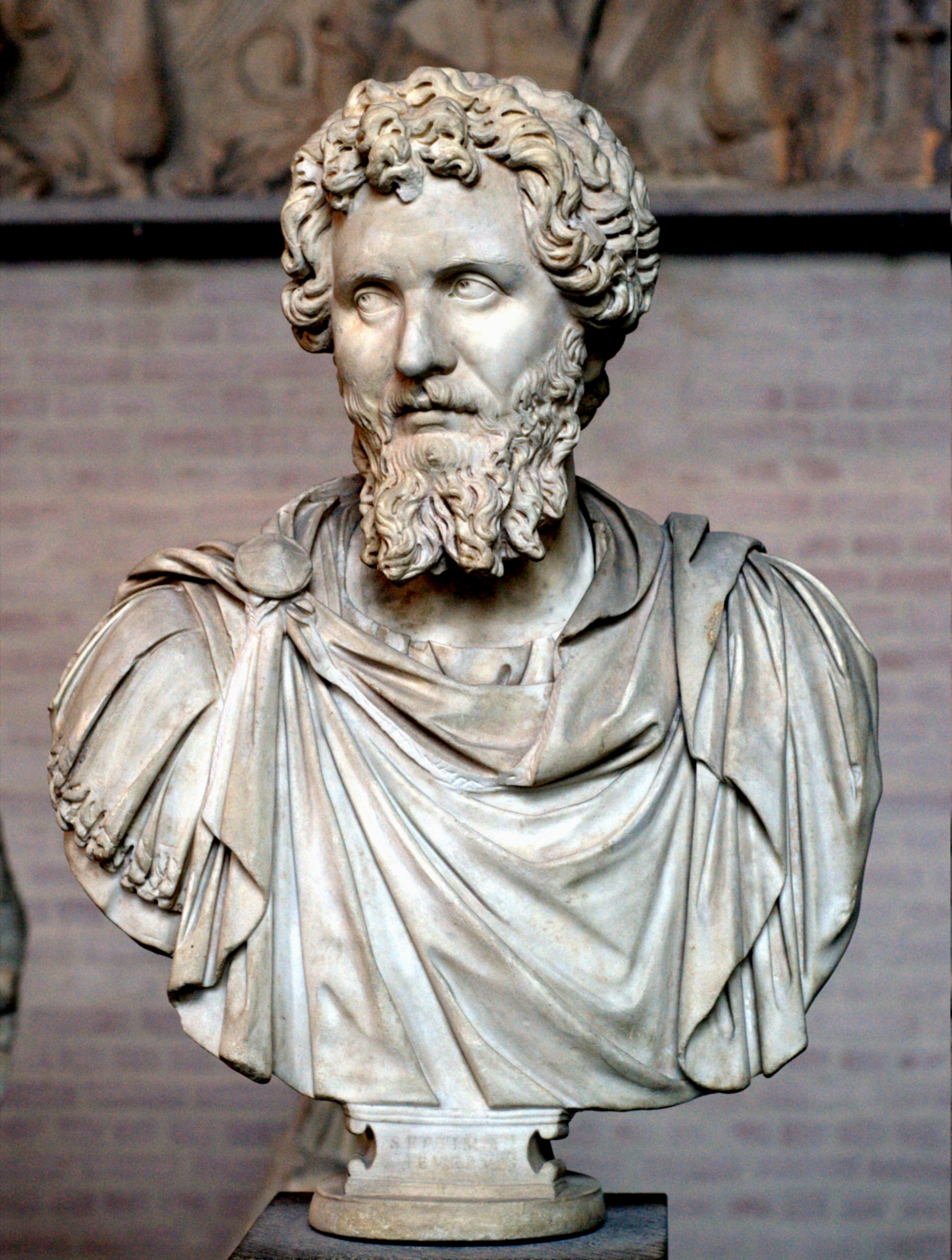
Septimius Severus

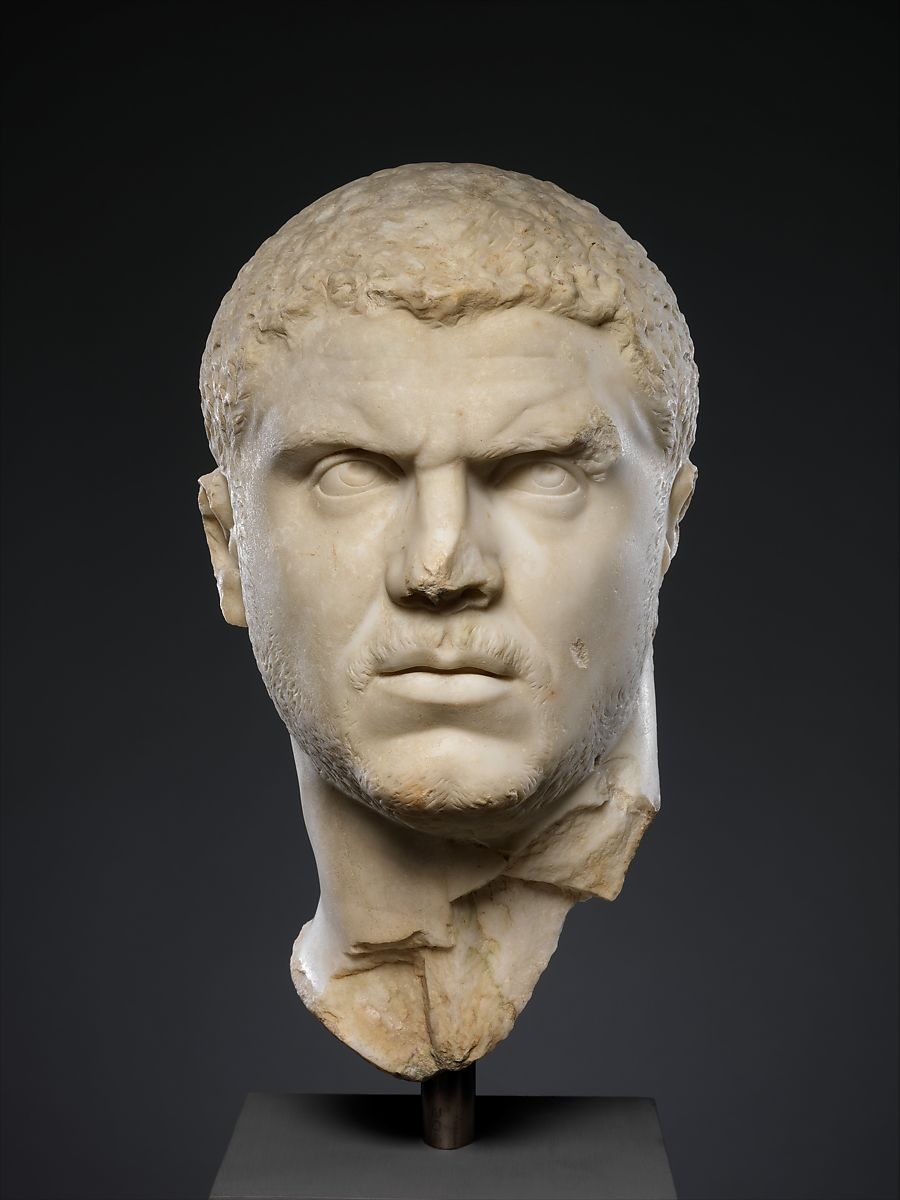
Caracalla

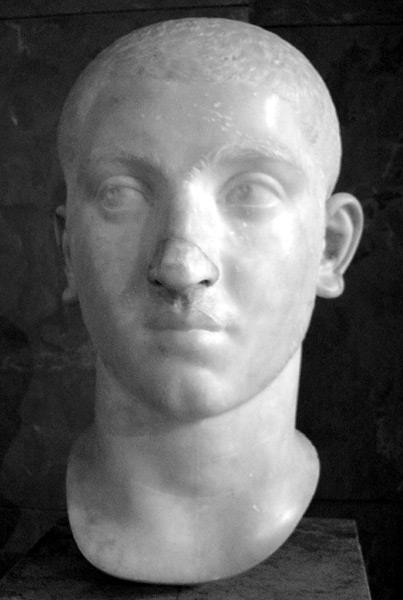
Alexander Severus

=== Deities ===
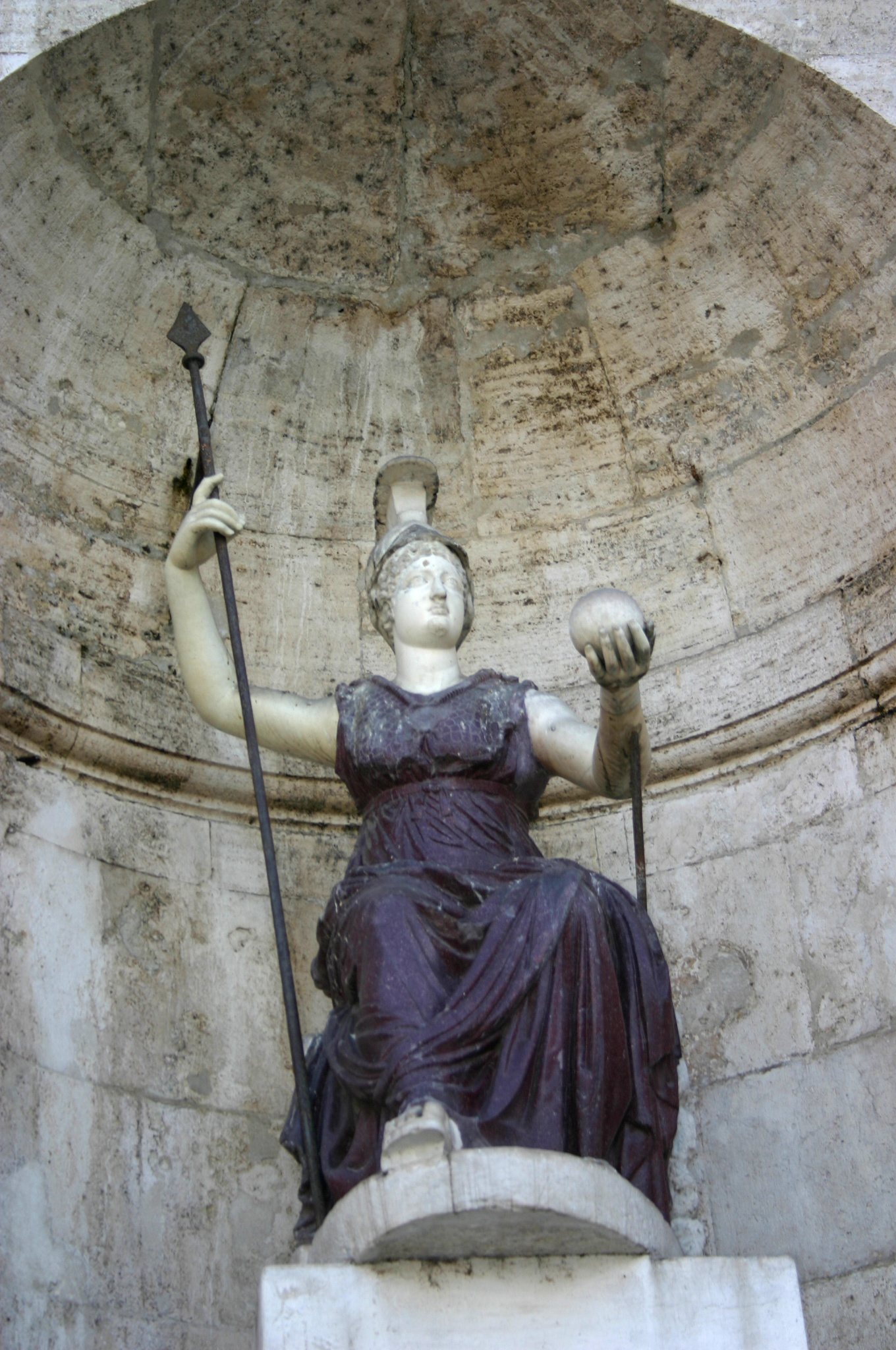
Roma

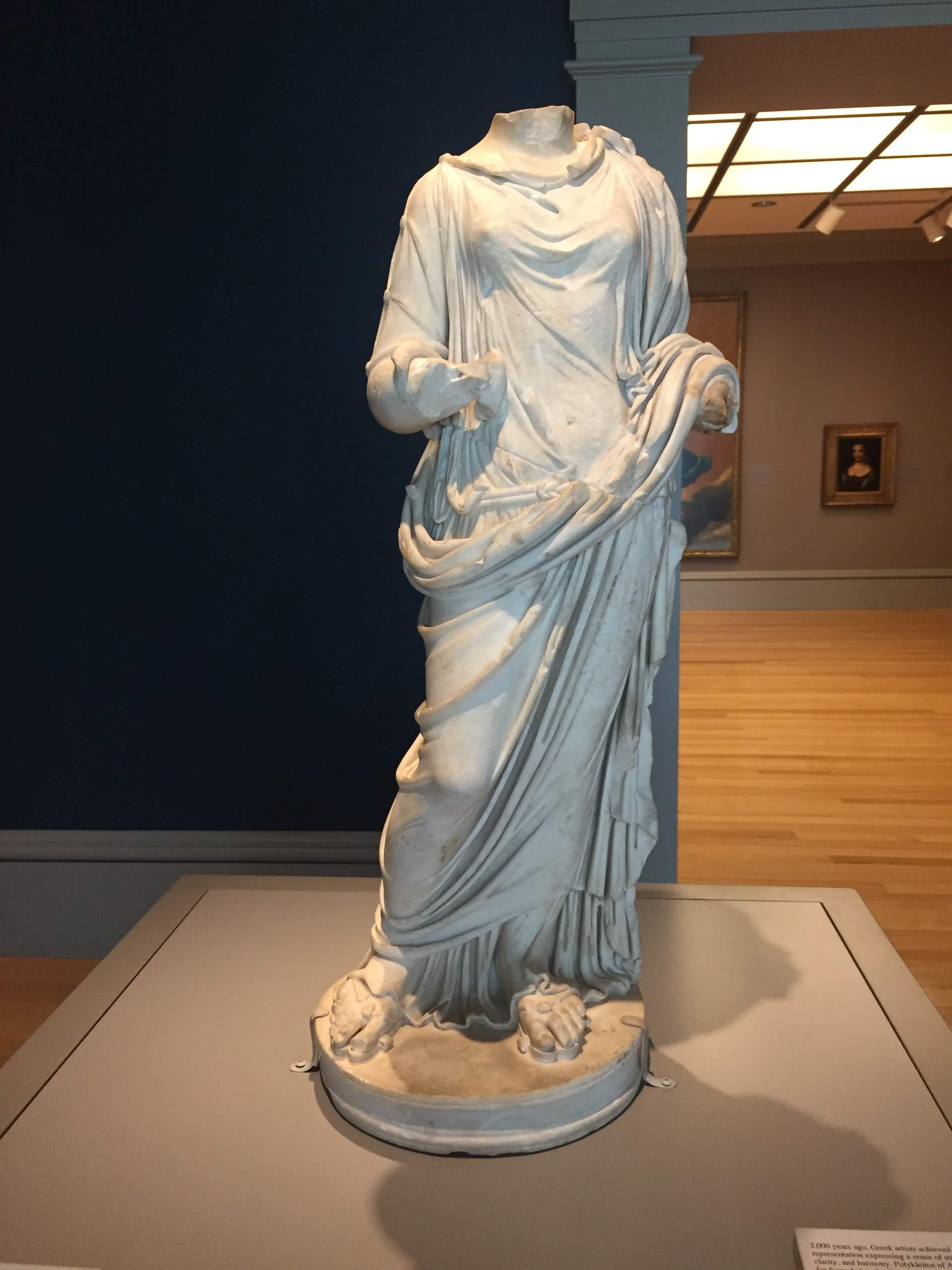
Statue of Salus

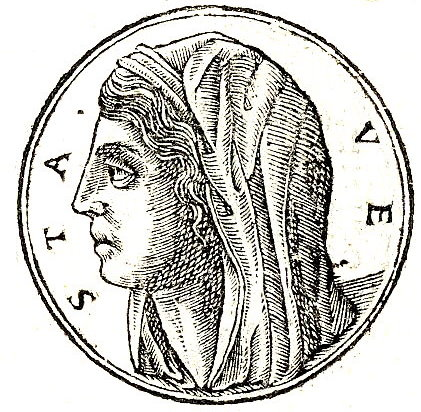
Vesta

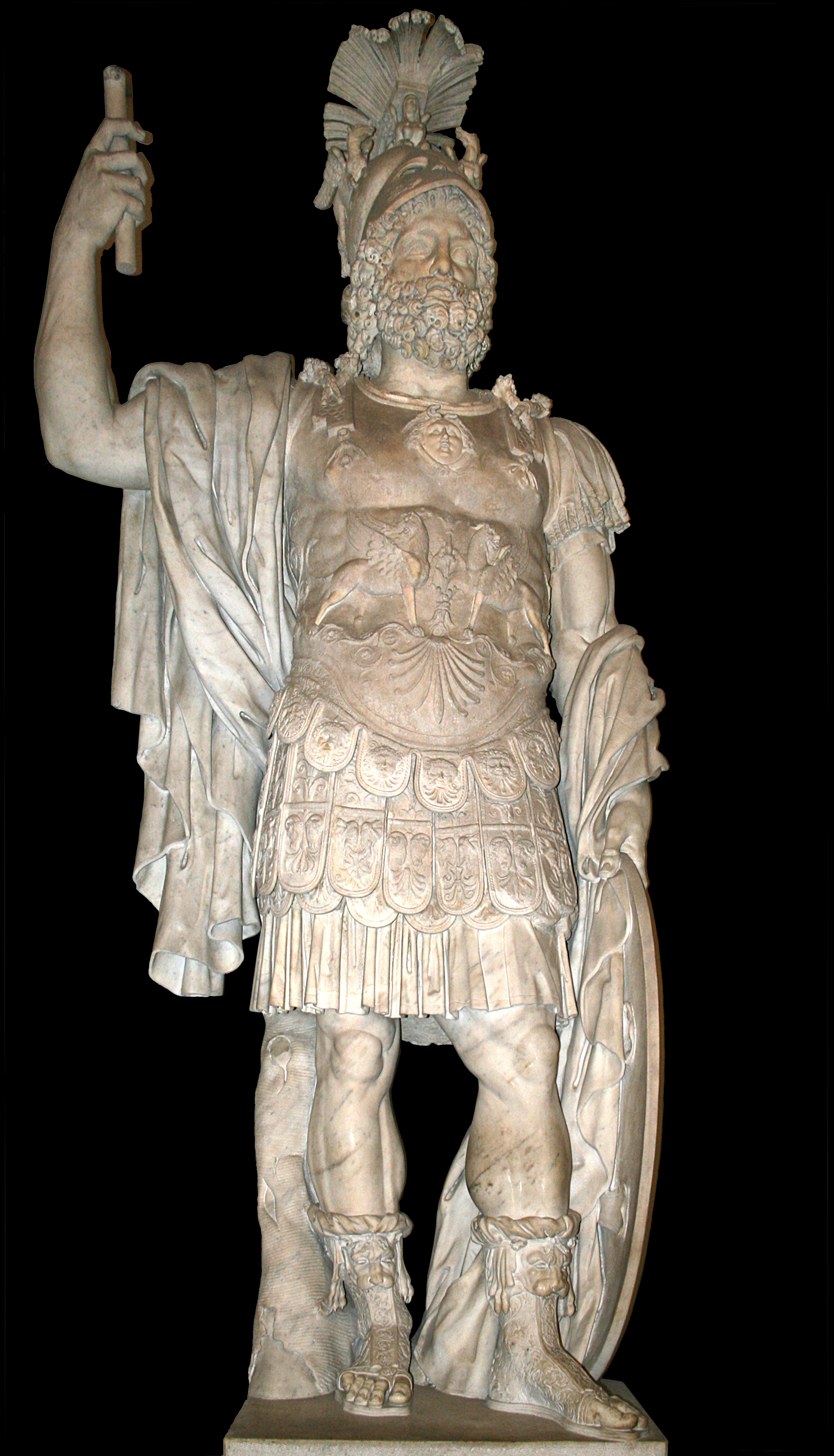
Mars

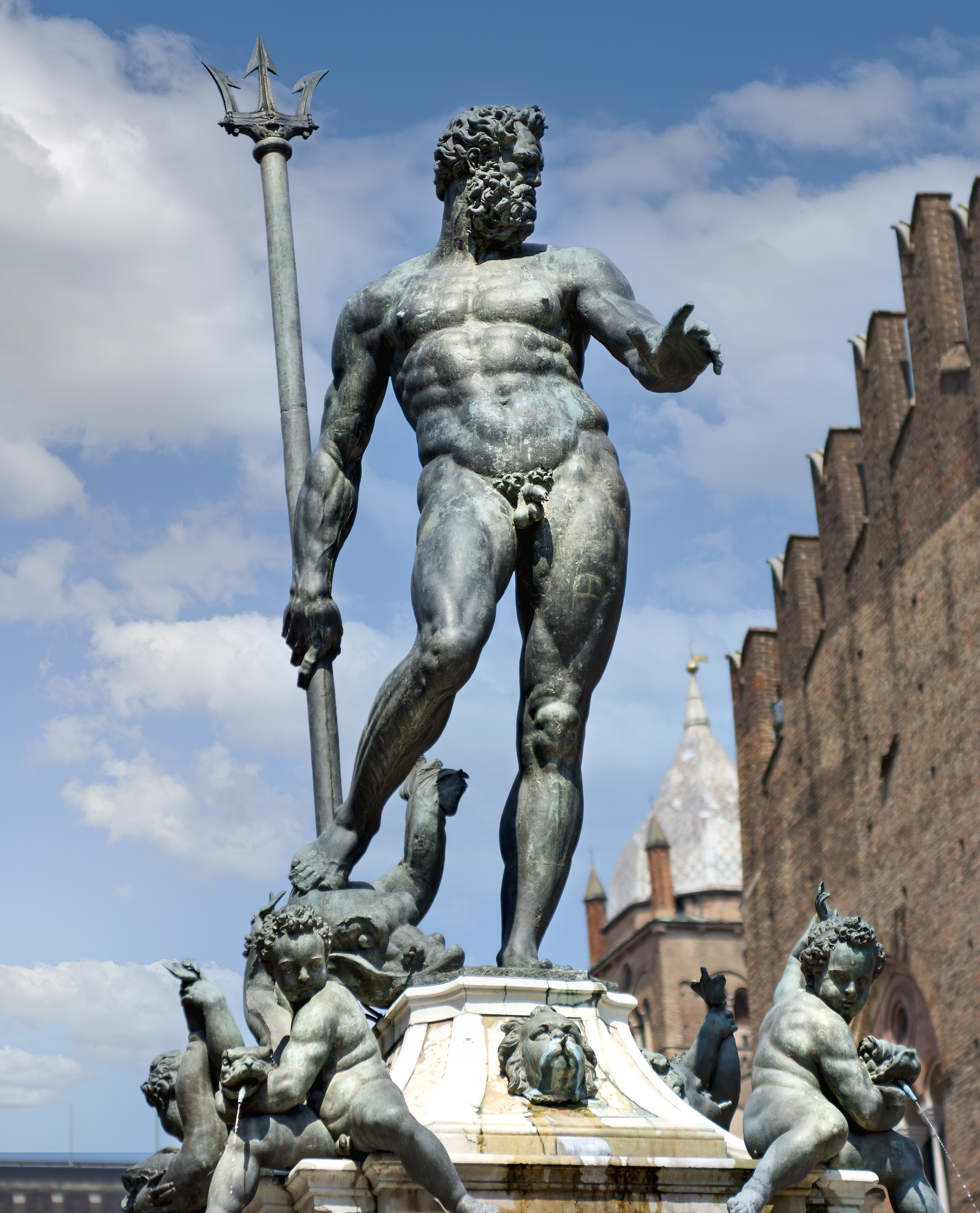
Neptune

=== Other Imperials ===
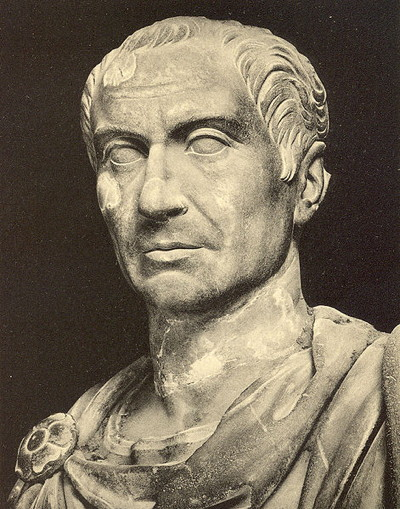
Julius Caesar

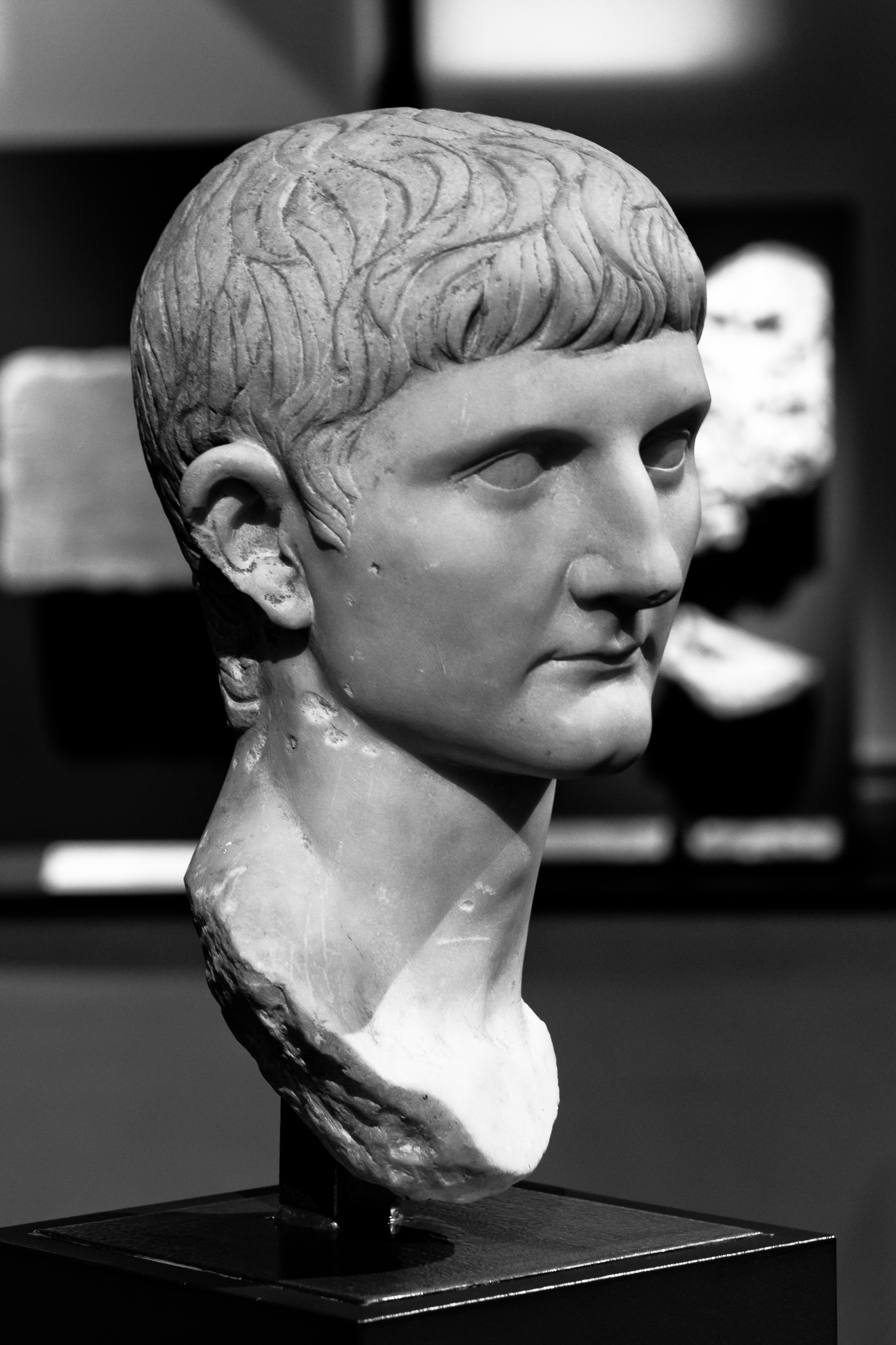
Germanicus

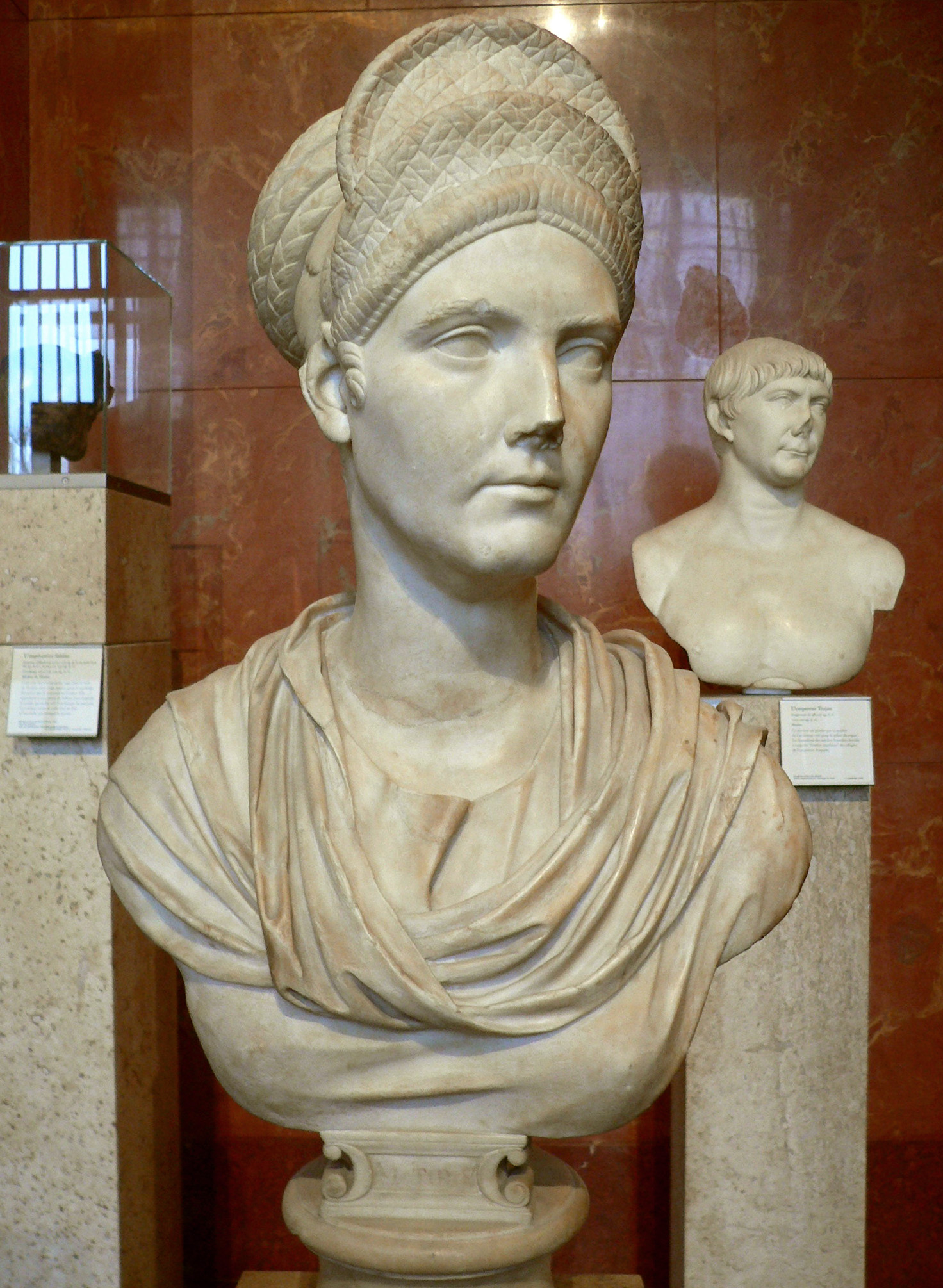
Matidia (Trajan's niece)

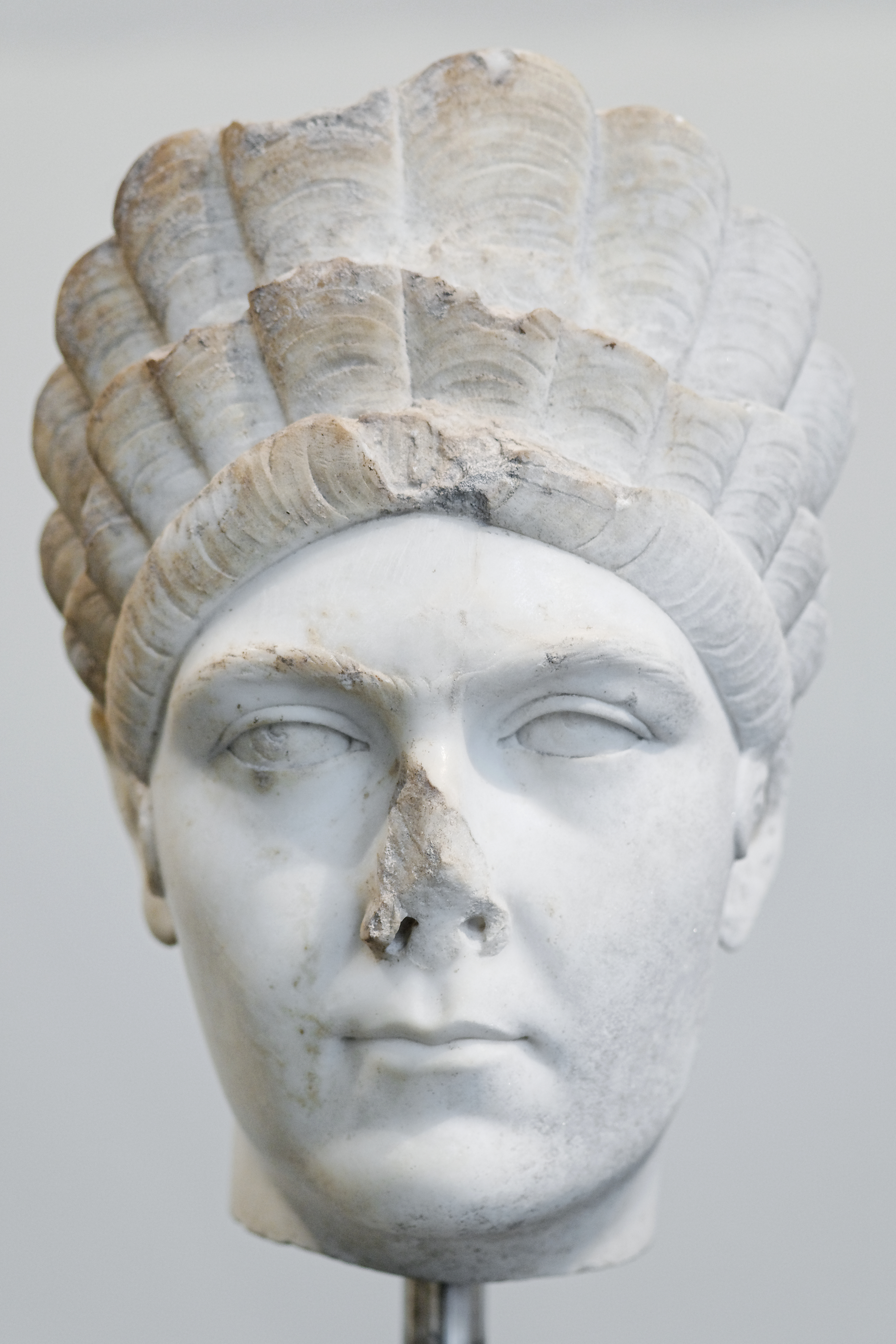
Ulpia Marciana (older sister of Trajan)

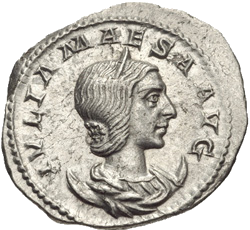
Julia Maesa (mother of J. Mamea)

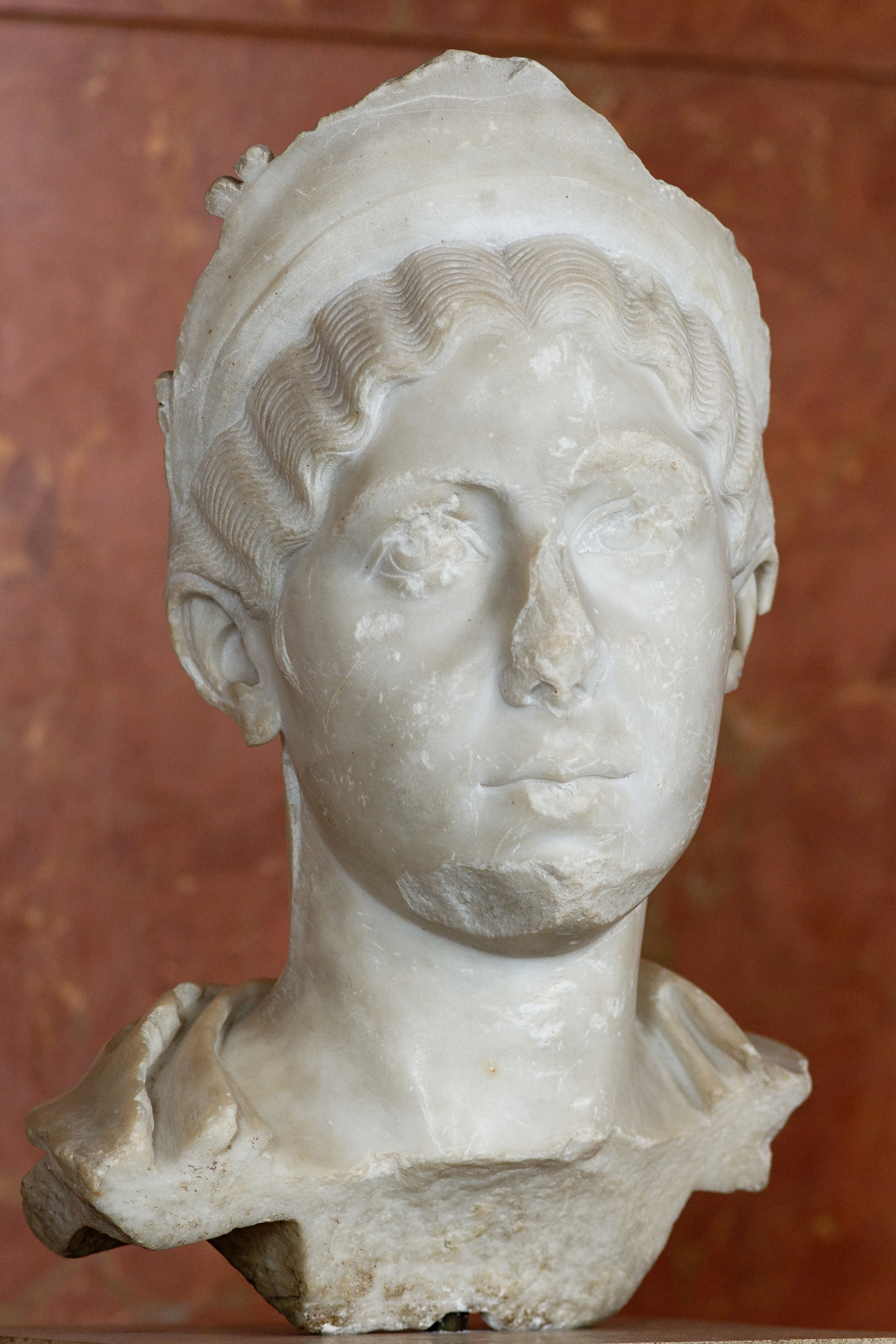
Julia Mamea (mother of Severus Alexander)

== English translations ==
- Levick, Dr Barbara; Levick, Barbara (2002). "The Feriale Duranum". The Government of the Roman Empire: A Sourcebook. Routledge. pp. 143–146. ISBN 978-1-134-57264-9.
- Lee, A. D. (2013-04-15). "A religious calendar: P. Dura". Pagans and Christians in Late Antiquity: A Sourcebook. Routledge. pp. 16–19. ISBN 978-1-136-61739-3.
- English translation (erroneously labeled as "translated from the Greek" instead of Latin)
