= Walter Fifield Snyder =

American historian

Walter Fifield Snyder (1912–1993) was an American scholar of ancient history.

Born in Northfield, New Jersey in 1912, Snyder graduated from Camden High School and earned an A.B. in Classics from Swarthmore College in 1932. He went on to earn his Ph.D. in Classics at Yale University in 1936 with a dissertation entitled "Chronological Studies in the History of the Roman Emperors" (under Michael Rostovtzeff). He then was a Fellow of the American Academy in Rome from 1936 to 1938. He first taught at Hunter College (part of the City University of New York) from 1940 to 1941, and then at the University of Richmond from 1941 to 1943. During World War II, he served as an officer in the US Naval Reserve. After training in the Japanese language and cryptography, he rose to the rank of Lieutenant Commander and served in the Pacific Theater with the Seventh Fleet. After the end of World War II, he returned to the University of Richmond where he earned tenure. He then joined the History Department at Clarion State College (now Clarion University) in 1967 as a full professor and taught there until his retirement in 1978.

Snyder's work focused on problems of chronology in Roman imperial history. He co-published a study of the papyrus from Dura-Europos known as the Feriale Duranum (with Robert O. Fink & Allan S. Hoey) with Yale University Press in 1940. In the same volume, he also published a study of Public Anniversaries in the Roman Empire. Additionally, he published an array of articles in leading journals on topics of historiography in Cassius Dio as well as on the Alexandrian Calendar. He was an esoteric (and extemporaneous) classroom lecturer who established the ancient history curriculum at Clarion University.

== Selected publications ==
- Walter F. Snyder, R.O. Fink, and Allan S. Hoey, eds., The Feriale Duranum [Yale Classical Studies, vol. 7] (New Haven: Yale University Press, 1940) [pp. 1–221]
- Walter F. Snyder, Public Anniversaries in the Roman Empire: The Epigraphical Evidence for Their Observance During the First Three Centuries [Yale Classical Studies, vol. 7] (New Haven: Yale University Press, 1940) [pp. 225–317]
- Walter F. Snyder, “Quinto Nundinas Pompeis,” Journal of Roman Studies (1936): 12-18
- Walter F. Snyder, “Ancient Coins Bequeathed by E. B. van Deman to the American Academy in Rome,” Memoirs of the American Academy at Rome 15 (1938): 21-2
- Walter F. Snyder, “Note on the Irregular Evidence upon the Date of the Beginning of the Year of the Tribunician Power during the Reigns of Septimius Severus and of Caracalla,” Memoirs of the American Academy at Rome 15 (1938): 62-9
- Walter F. Snyder, “Ἡμέραι Σεβασταί,” Aegyptus 19 (1938): 197-233
- Walter F. Snyder, “On Chronology in the Imperial Books of Cassius Dio's Roman History,” Klio 33 (1940): 39-56
- Walter F. Snyder, “When Was the Alexandrian Calendar Established?,” American Journal of Philology 66 (1943): 385-98
- Walter F. Snyder, “Nero's Birthday in Egypt and His Year of Birth,” Historia 13 (1964): 503-6
- Walter F. Snyder, “Progress Report on the Ἡμέραι Σεβασταί,” Aegyptus 44 (1964): 145-69
