= Gene Stratton Porter Cabin (Geneva, Indiana) =

Historic building

- U.S. National Register of Historic Places
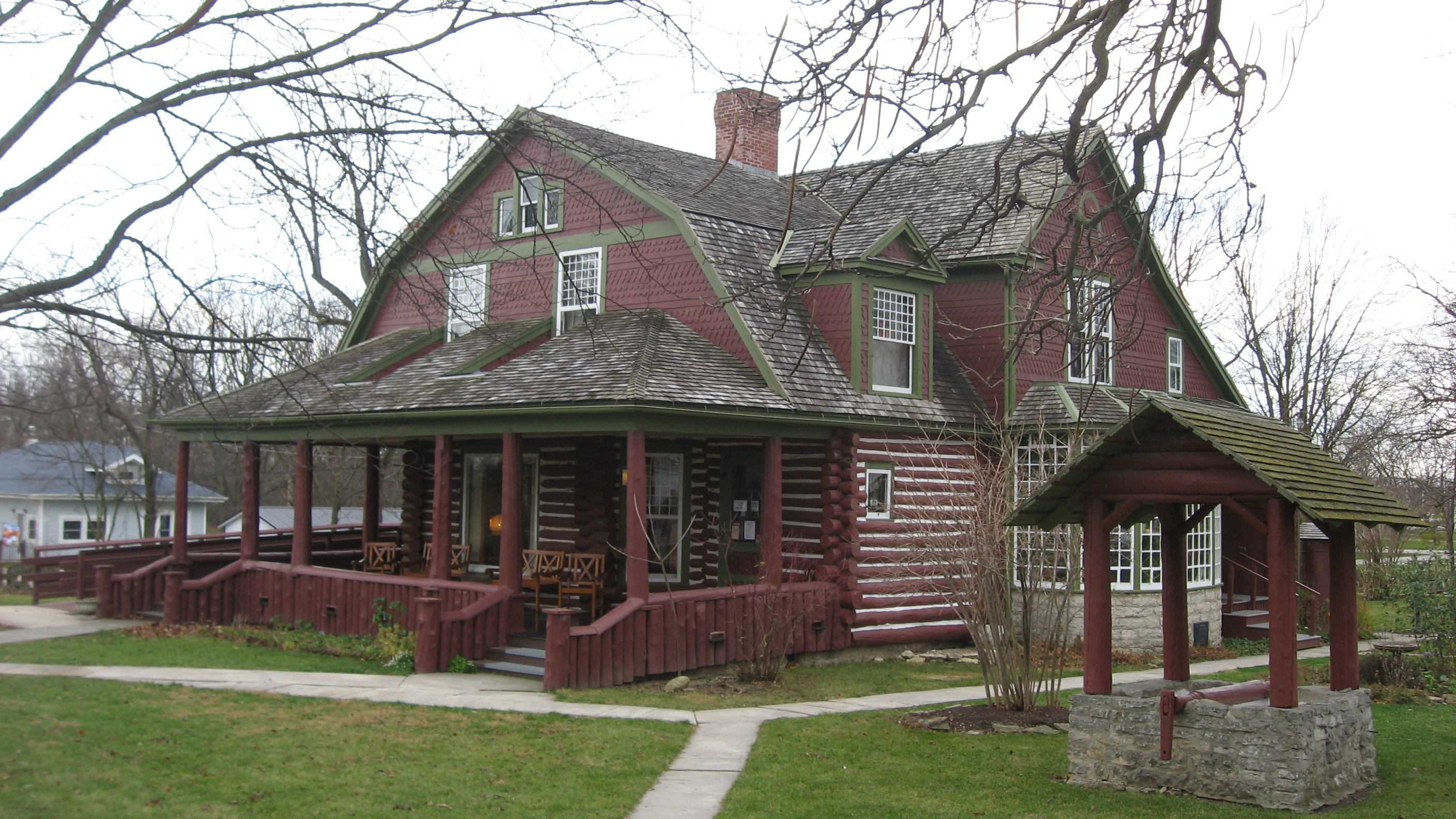
- Limberlost State Historic Site, November 2011

- Location within Adams County, Indiana Location within Indiana Location within the United States
- Location: 200 E. 6th St., Geneva, Indiana
- Coordinates: 40°35′13″N 84°57′36″W
- Area: 1.2 acres (0.49 ha)
- Built: 1895
- NRHP reference No.: 74000027
- Added to NRHP: June 27, 1974

Gene Stratton-Porter Cabin, (Geneva, Indiana), known as the Limberlost Cabin and the Limberlost State Historic Site, was the former home of Gene Stratton Porter, a noted Indiana author who lived in the home from 1895 to 1913. The two-story, fourteen-room log cabin is located near the Limberlost Swamp on the outskirts of Geneva in Adams County, Indiana. Stratton-Porter designed the Queen Anne-style rustic home with the help of an architect. It was listed on the National Register of Historic Places in 1974.

Stratton-Porter, who began her literary career in 1900, used the cabin as the base for her field research, natural history collecting, writing projects, and photographic work. She wrote The Song of the Cardinal (1903) and researched Moths of the Limberlost (1912) while living at the cabin. Stratton-Porter also used the Limberlost area as the setting for three novels: Freckles (1904) and A Girl of the Limberlost (1909) and Laddie (1913).

== History ==
Gene Stratton-Porter, her husband, Charles Dorwin Porter, and their daughter Jeannette, moved from Decatur to Geneva, Indiana, after Jeanette's birth in 1887. Construction began on their new, two-story home at 200 East Sixth Avenue in Geneva in 1894. Stratton-Porter designed the home, which was described as "the most pretentious dwelling in the Geneva area," with the help of an architect. The cabin was completed in 1895, the same year that she began to write and publish her first magazine articles. The Porters named their new home Limberlost Cabin in reference to its location near the Limberlost Swamp, in Adams and Jay Counties, where Stratton-Porter found the inspiration for her writing. Stratton-Porter lived in the cabin at Geneva with her husband and daughter for eighteen years and referred to their large, fourteen-room home as "the cabin."

Between 1888 and 1910, the area's wetlands at the Limberlost Swamp were drained to reclaim the land for commercial and agricultural development. By 1912 the work to drain the wetlands for cultivation was complete and the natural habitat of the wildlife that Stratton-Porter documented in her books was destroyed. As a result of the development, Stratton-Porter decided to relocate. In 1914 Stratton-Porter and her family moved from the Limberlost Cabin to a new cabin that she called Wildflower Woods at Sylvan Lake near Rome City in Noble County, Indiana, about 80 miles (130 km) from Geneva. Charles Porter continued to live at Limberlost Cabin and commuted to Sylvan Lake on the weekends. The Porters sold the property in Geneva in 1923.

The Limberlost Conservation Association of Geneva donated the Limberlost Cabin to the State of Indiana in 1947. The Indiana State Museum and Historic Sites operates the state historic site as a historic house museum. Some of Stratton-Porter's possessions are on display in the cabin, including her collection of mounted moths, household furnishings, and other memorabilia. The property was listed on the National Register of Historic Places in 1974. The site is open to the public and includes the Limberlost Cabin, a carriage house, and a visitor center. Guided tours of the cabin are available.

== Description ==
Working with an architect, Stratton-Porter designed a two-story, fourteen-room home for her family in the late 1890s. The home was inspired by the Forestry Building at the World's Columbian Exposition in Chicago, which the Porters visited in 1893.

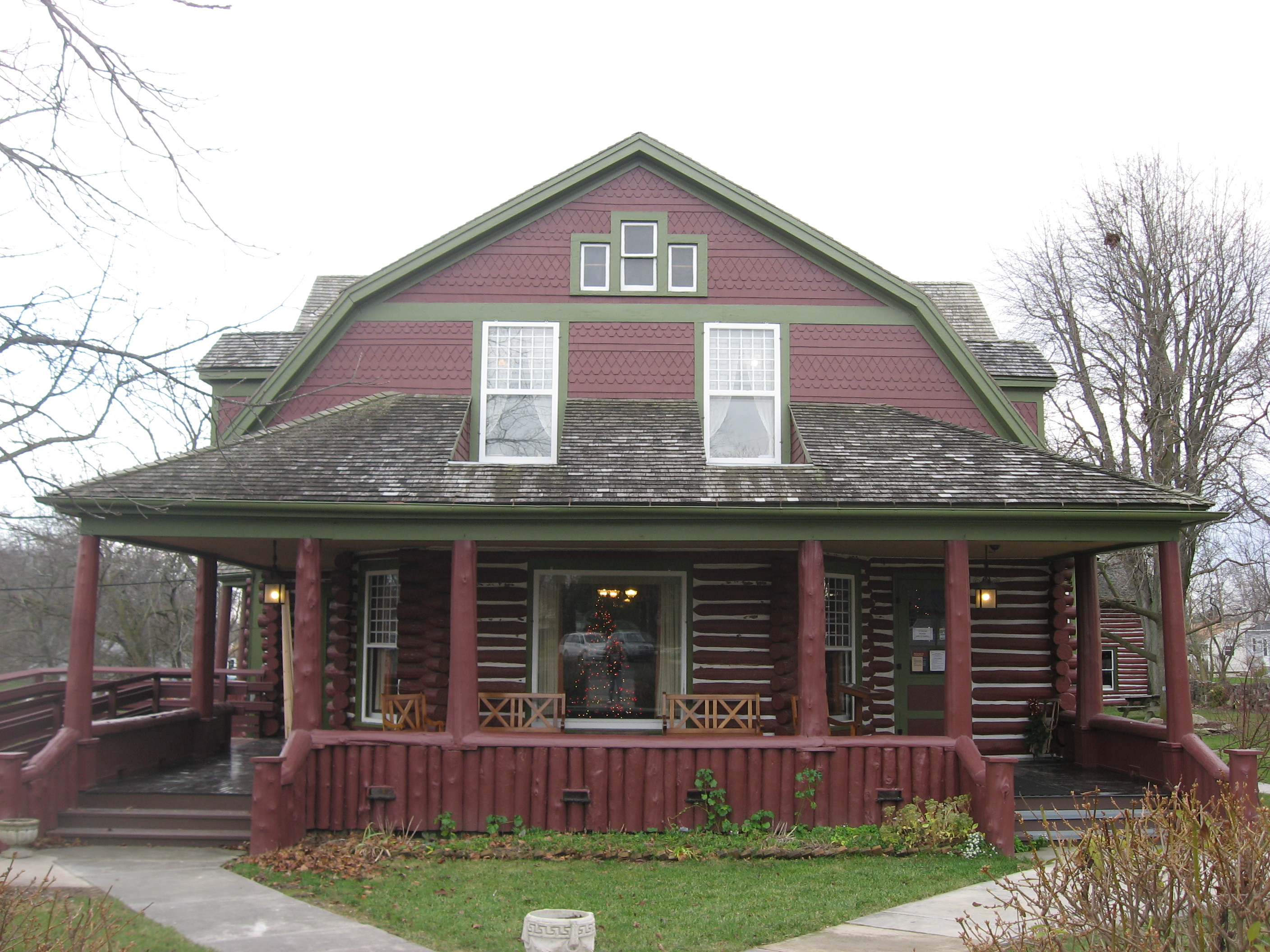
Limberlost State Historic Site, front of cabin

The two-story, Queen Anne-style home has a Wisconsin white cedar-log exterior and features California redwood shingles on the upper story. The front facade features a single-story wraparound porch with log pillars across the front and east side. The fourteen-room home includes a wood-framed interior with red oak panels in the entrance hall, dining room, and library. The first floor also contains a kitchen, two bedrooms, a music room, a small conservatory, and a full bathroom (which Stratton-Porter also used as a photographic darkroom). The second floor included four large rooms. The home also featured seven fireplaces, large windows, and white oak floors. A cedar-log barn/carriage house was erected behind the home. The property also included a yard filled with fruit trees, vines, and bushes, as well as a large flower garden.

== Significance ==
The Limberlost Cabin, in addition to serving as the Porters' residence, was Stratton-Porter's base for her field research, natural history collecting, writing projects, and photographic work. While residing in Geneva, Stratton-Porter spent much of her time exploring, observing nature, sketching, and making photographs at the Limberlost Swamp. The cabin is also where she began her literary career at the age of thirty-six. Stratton-Porter used her fictional writings to educate readers about birding and nature while interlacing the stories with romance and moral lessons. Her popularity was so high during World War I that "reprints of the novel were said to have littered the trenches."

Stratton-Porter's first published article appeared in Recreation magazine in 1900 when she was living at Limberlost Cabin. She also wrote her first novel, The Song of the Cardinal (1903), while living there. Stratton-Porter used the nearby swamp for research for her natural history book, Moths of the Limberlost (1912), as well. In addition, the area was the setting for three of her popular novels: Freckles (1904), A Girl of the Limberlost (1909) and Laddie (1913). While a resident of Geneva, Stratton-Porter became known as "The Bird Lady" and "The Lady of the Limberlost" to her friends and readers.
