= Sherman Dalrymple =

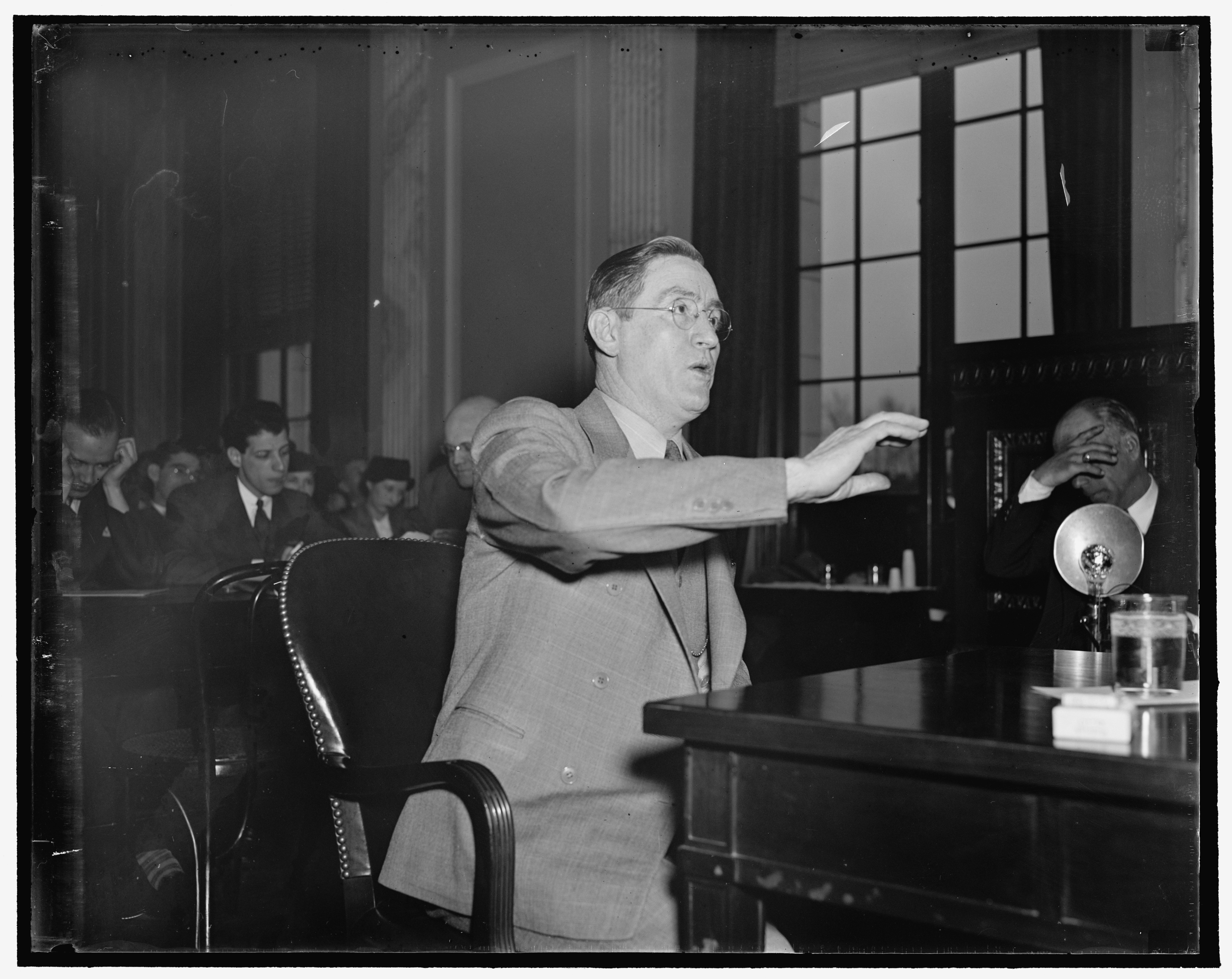
Dalrymple in 1937

Sherman Harrison Dalrymple (1889 – March 16, 1962) was an American labor unionist.

Born in Roane County, West Virginia, Dalrymple moved to Akron, Ohio in 1903 to pay off debts on his family's farm, finding work in the rubber industry. He served in the United States Marines during World War I, becoming a second lieutenant. In the 1920s, he worked making tires for the Goodrich Corporation, and organized a union local in the plant.

In 1935, the United Rubber Workers of America was founded, and Dalrymple was elected as its first president. The union was affiliated to the Congress of Industrial Organizations (CIO), and Dalrymple was elected as one of the federation's vice-presidents. He also served as head of the CIO's social security committee.

Dalrymple opposed communism, and in 1939, he was a leading figure in efforts to remove communists from the leadership of CIO unions. During World War II, he served on the Labor Policy Advisory Committee of the National Defense Advisory Committee. In 1944, he visited battle zones in Europe with Dwight D. Eisenhower and his logistics chief, John C. H. Lee. During the war, he opposed industrial action, including the 1945 strikes at Goodyear and Firestone. However, the union locals in Akron backed the strikes, and the conflict led Dalrymple to resign as union president.

Trade union offices
Preceded by Union founded	President of the United Rubber Workers of America; 1935–1945	Succeeded by L. S. Buckmaster
