= Lenhart =

Lenhart is a surname. Notable people with the surname include:

- Amanda Lenhart, senior research specialist at the Pew Internet & American Life Project
- Heidi Lenhart (born 1973), American actress
- Jeanne Lenhart, American volleyball player
- Johnny Lenhart (1915–1991), American basketball player
- Julius Lenhart (1875–1962), Austrian gymnast
- Ralph Lenhart (1930–2022), American educator and politician
- Sascha Lenhart (born 1973), German footballer
- Stefan Lenhart (born 1969), German artist
- Steven Lenhart (born 1986), American soccer player
- Suzanne Lenhart (born 1954), American mathematician
- Zdeněk Lenhart (born 1948), orienteering competitor who competed for Czechoslovakia

== See also ==
- Lenhart Schubert, American artificial intelligence researcher
- Lenhart Shultz (1889–1964), American politician
- Leki Lenhart, German sporting equipment company
- Lenhart Farm, Pennsylvania
- Lenhart Farmhouse, Indiana
- Hotel Lenhart, California
