= Lennart =

Male given name and family name

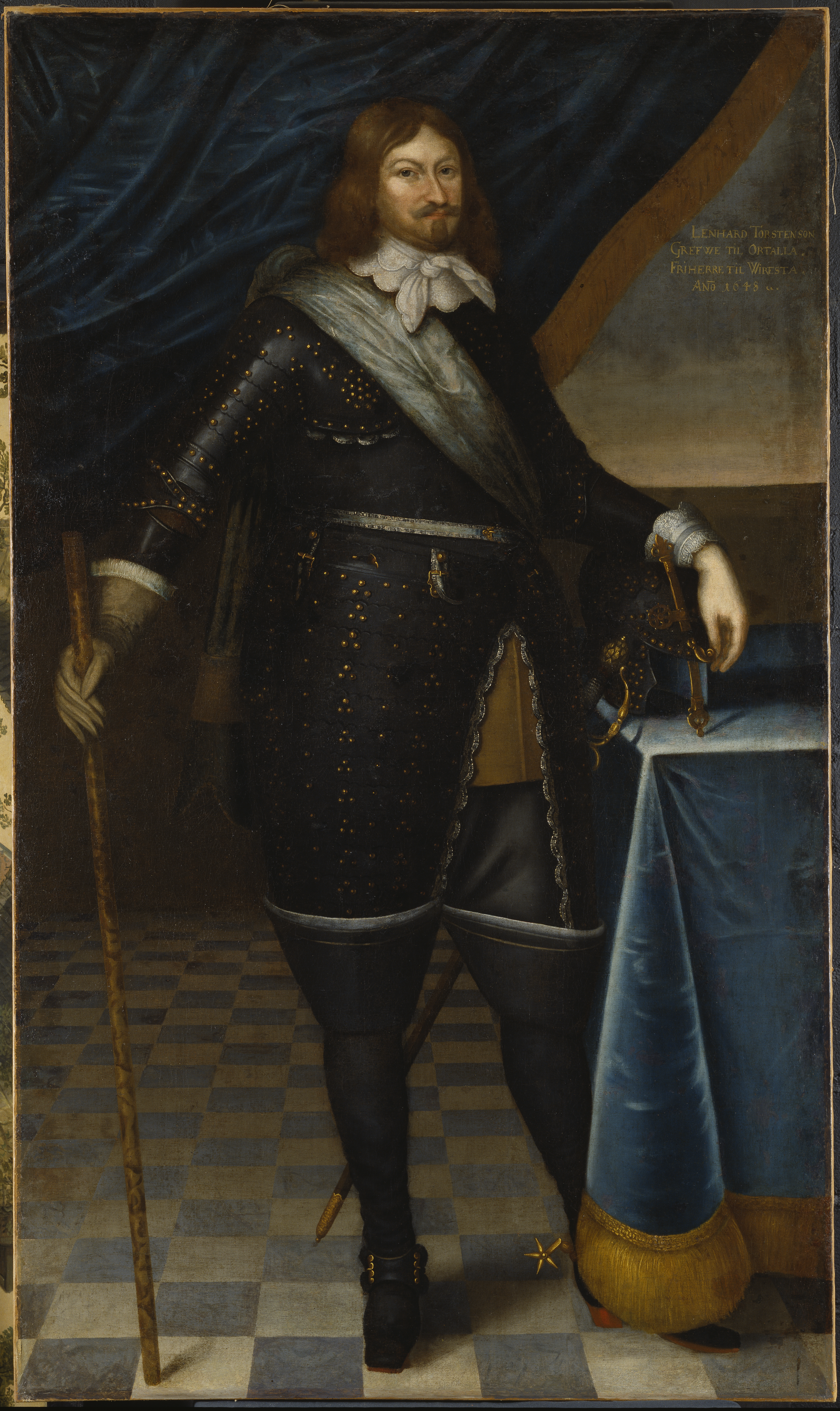
Lennart Torstenson

Lennart or Lennarth is a Germanic variant of the name Leonard, most common in Scandinavia and German-speaking countries as a surname or masculine given name. Notable people with the name include:

== Surname ==
- Camilla Lennarth (born 1988), Swedish golfer
- Isobel Lennart (1915–1971), American screenwriter and playwright
- Sonja de Lennart (born 1920), German fashion designer

== Given name ==
=== A–E ===
- Lennart Alexandersson (born 1947), Swedish footballer, father of football players Niclas and Daniel Alexandersson
- Lennart Åqvist (1932–2019), Swedish logician
- Lennart Askinger (1922–1995), Swedish football defender
- Lennart Atterwall (1911–2001), Swedish javelin thrower and European champion
- Lennart Augustsson, Swedish computer scientist
- Lennart Axelsson (musician) (born 1941), Swedish trumpet player
- Lennart Axelsson (politician) (born 1953), Swedish politician, member of the Riksdag
- Lennart Beijer (born 1947), Swedish Left Party politician, member of the Riksdag 1994–2006
- Lennart Bengtsson (born 1935), Swedish meteorologist currently interested in global climate modelling
- Lennart Bergelin (1925–2008), Swedish tennis player and coach
- Lennart Bernadotte, Count of Wisborg (1909–2004), Prince of Sweden and Duke of Småland from 1909 to 1932
- Lennart Bladh (1920–2006), Swedish politician, member of the Riskdag from 1974 to 1985
- Lennart Bodström (1928–2015), Swedish politician, Minister for Foreign Affairs from 1982 to 1985
- Lennart Bohman (1909–1979), Swedish boxer
- Lennart Bunke (1912–1988), Swedish football forward
- Lennart Carleson (born 1928), Swedish mathematician
- Lennart Carlström (born 1943), Swedish orienteering competitor
- Lennart Daléus (born 1946), Swedish politician, leader of the Swedish Centre Party from 1998 to 2001
- Lennart Dozzi (1910–1987), Swedish canoeist
- Lennarth Ebbinge (born 1956), Swedish handball player
- Lennart Ekdahl (1912–2005), Swedish sailor
- Lennart Eriksson (musician) (born 1956), the bass player in the Swedish punk rock band Ebba Grön
- Lennart Eriksson (handballer) (born 1944), Swedish handball player

=== F–L ===
- Lennart Fremling (1946–2013), Swedish Liberal People's Party politician
- Lennart Geijer (1909–1999), Swedish politician and lawyer
- Lennart Ginman (born 1960), Danish bassist, composer and music producer
- Lennart Green (born 1941), Swedish magician, world champion close-up/card magician
- Lennart Gripenberg (1852–1933), Finnish politician
- Lennart Gustavsson (born 1954), Swedish Left Party politician
- Lennart Hannelius (1893–1950), Finnish sport shooter
- Lennart Harms (born 1991), German politician
- Lennart Hartmann (born 1991), German footballer
- Lennart Hedmark (born 1944), Swedish track and field athlete
- Lennart Hedquist (born 1943), Swedish politician of the Moderate Party
- Lennart Heimer (1930–2007), Swedish-American neuroscientist and educator
- Lennart Hellsing (1919–2015), Swedish translator and children's book writer
- Lennart Hjulström (1938–2022), Swedish actor and director
- Lennart Hyland (1919–1993), Swedish TV-show host and journalist
- Lennart Jähkel (born 1956), Swedish actor
- Lennart Johansson (1929–2019), Swedish football administrator, president of the Union of European Football Associations from 1990 to 2007
- Lennart Johansson (ice hockey) (1941–2010), Swedish professional ice hockey player
- Lennart Johnsson (born 1944), Swedish computer scientist and engineer
- Lennart Klackenberg (1931–2026), Swedish diplomat and civil servant
- Lennart Klingström (1916–1994), Swedish sprint canoeist
- Lennart Klockare (born 1945), Swedish social democratic politician
- Lennart Kollberg, fictional character in the books by Maj Sjöwall and Per Wahlöö
- Lennart Kollmats (1943–2025), Swedish Liberal People's Party politician
- Lennart Koskinen (born 1944), clergyman in the Church of Sweden, serving as bishop in Visby
- Lennart Larsson (cross-country skier) (1930–2021), Swedish cross-country skier
- Lennart Larsson (footballer) (born 1953), Swedish footballer
- Lennart Lindgren (1915–1952), Swedish Olympic sprinter
- Lennart Lindgren (Swedish Navy officer) (1919–2013)
- Lennart Lindroos (1886–1921), Finnish breaststroke swimmer
- Lennart Ljung (engineer) (born 1946), Swedish Professor in the Chair of Control Theory at Linköping University since 1976
- Lennart Ljung (general) (1921–1990), Swedish Army general

=== M–Z ===
- Lennart Magnusson (1924–2011), Swedish fencer
- Lennart Mathiasen (born 1948), Danish sprint canoeist who competed in the early 1970s
- Lennart Meri (1928–2006), Estonian writer, film director and statesman, President of Estonia from 1992 to 2001
- Lennart Nilsson (1922–2017), Swedish photographer and scientist
- Lennart Nilsson (1944–2025), Swedish politician
- Lennart Nylander (1901–1966), Swedish diplomat
- Lennart Olsson (born 1961), Swedish zoologist & embryologist, professor of comparative zoology at the Friedrich Schiller University of Jena
- Lennart Petrell (born 1984), Finnish professional ice hockey player
- Lennart Petri (1914–1996), Swedish diplomat
- Lennart Poettering (born 1980), German software engineer
- Lennart Rodhe (1916–2005), Swedish artist, painter and printmaker
- Lennart Rönnback (1905–2007), Finnish White Guard veteran of the Finnish Civil War of 1918
- Lennart Rönnberg (1938–2022), Swedish Army major general
- Lennart Roslund (born 1946), Swedish sailor
- Lennart Samuelsson (1924–2012), football player from Sweden
- Lennart Sandin (1919–1991), Swedish bobsledder who competed in the early 1950s
- Lennart Skoglund (1929–1975), Swedish football player
- Lennart Söderberg (1941–2022), Swedish football manager and former football player
- Lennart Steffensen (born 1977), Norwegian football midfielder
- Lennart Stekelenburg (born 1986), Dutch swimmer who is specialized in breaststroke
- Lennart Stenberg (born 1946), Swedish author of Den nya nordiska floran
- Lennart Strand (1921–2004), Swedish middle-distance runner, 1500 m silver medallist at the 1948 London Summer Olympics
- Lennart Strandberg (1915–1989), Swedish athlete who competed mainly in the 100 metres at the 1936 Olympics in Berlin
- Lennart Svedberg (1944–1972), Swedish ice hockey defenceman
- Lennart Swahn (1927–2008), Swedish journalist and radio and television personality
- Lennart Thy (born 1992), German footballer
- Lennart Torstenson (1603–1651), Count of Ortala, Baron of Virestad (1603–1651), Swedish Field Marshal and military engineer
- Lennart van der Linden (born 1983), Dutch politician
- Lennart Viitala (1921–1966), Finnish freestyle wrestler and Olympic champion
- Lennart von Post (1884–1951), Swedish naturalist and geologist
- Lennart Wass (born 1953), Swedish football manager
- Lennart Wing (born 1935), Swedish international footballer who played in defence

== See also ==
- Lenaerts, a surname
- Lenard, a surname
- Lenhart, a surname
- Municipality of Lenart, a small town and municipality in northeastern Slovenia
- Lennert (disambiguation)
- Leonard (disambiguation)
