= Family Online Safety Institute =

International non-profit organization

- Abbreviation: FOSI
- Formation: February 2007
- Purpose: "The Family Online Safety Institute works to make the online world safer for kids and their families by identifying and promoting best practice, tools and methods in the field of online safety, that also respect free expression."
- Headquarters: Washington, DC
- CEO: Stephen Balkam
- Website: https://www.fosi.org/

The Family Online Safety Institute (FOSI) is an international nonprofit organization. It is registered as a 501(c)(3) tax-deductible nonprofit charity in the United States and a registered charity in the United Kingdom. FOSI was founded in February 2007 by Stephen Balkam, who had created the Internet Content Rating Association (ICRA). FOSI is chaired by Dave Pierce, Vice President of Public Affairs, NCTA.

== Membership ==
The Family Online Safety Institute is a membership-based organization, members pay an annual stipend to FOSI. In turn FOSI uses this funding for its general operation and to further its goals and mission. Each of the FOSI members have a representative on the Board of Directors.

Full members of FOSI include prominent American and British companies. Members include AOL, AT&T, Comcast, Facebook, France Telecom, Entertainment Software Association, GSM Association, Google, Microsoft, National Cable & Telecommunications Association, Nominum, Optenet KCOM Group, Rulespace, Sprint, Streamshield, Symantec, T-Mobile USA, Telefonica, Telmex, Time Warner Cable, CTIA – The Wireless Association, Verizon, Vodafone and Yahoo!.

== Events and annual conferences ==
=== Annual conferences ===
==== 2013 ====
The Family Online Safety Institute's 2013 Annual Conference will be taking place at the Ronald Reagan Building and International Trade Center, in Washington DC. This year’s conference, being held on November 6 and 7, will bring together the top thinkers in online safety: academics, educators, law enforcement, industry, policy makers, and non-profits.

==== 2012 ====
FOSI's 2012 Annual Conference, "A Safer Internet For All" was held at the Andrew W. Mellon Auditorium in Washington, DC on November 14–15, 2012. The conference featured over 80 speakers, 20 exhibitors and more than 450 attendees from at least 14 different countries.

Notable speakers included Karen Cator, Nancy Lublin, Constance M. Yowell of the John D. and Catherine T. MacArthur Foundation, Dr. Howard J. Schaffer, and Dr. Michael Rich from the Center on Media and Child Health.

==== 2011 ====
FOSI's 2011 Annual Conference, "Evaluate. Innovate. Collaborate. Strategies for Safe and Healthy Online Use" was held at the Andrew W. Mellon Auditorium in Washington, DC on November 9–10, 2011. The conference featured over 80 speakers, 26 exhibitors and more than 450 attendees from 13 different countries.

Notable speakers included Dominican Republic Vice President Margarita Cedeño de Fernández, Dr. Edward Amoroso of AT&T, and Michael Altschul of CTIA – The Wireless Association.

==== 2010 ====
FOSI's 2010 Annual Conference, "Internet Freedom, Safety and Citizenship: A Global Call to Action" was held at the Andrew W. Mellon Auditorium in Washington, DC on November 9–10, 2010. The conference had 400 attendees, 90 speakers and 31 exhibitors from 13 countries.

Notable speakers included Microsoft's Peter Cullen, Tami Erwin of Verizon Wireless, Anna M. Gomez of National Cable & Telecommunications Association, United States Ambassador-at-Large for Global Women's Issues Melanne Verveer, the U.S. Federal Communications Commission's Josh Gottheimer, and Karen Cator.

==== 2009 ====
FOSI's 2009 Annual Conference, "Building a Culture of Responsibility: From Online Safety to Digital Citizenship," was held at the Andrew W. Mellon Auditorium in Washington, DC on November 4–5, 2009. The conference had 350 attendees, 80 speakers and 31 exhibitors from 15 countries. Technology writer and journalist, Larry Magid described the event as "a watershed moment in the 16-year history of online safety education."

==== 2008 ====
FOSI's 2008 Annual Conference, "Safe at Any Speed: Online Safety Tools, Rules and Public Policies", was held at the Newseum in Washington, DC on December 11, 2008. At the conference, FOSI made a series of recommendations for the new Obama Administration and called for:

- An annual White House Online Safety Summit
- The creation of a United States Council for Internet Safety
- An Online Safety Program to fund a range of research, educational and awareness-raising projects
- A National Safety Officer within the new office of the Chief of Technology Officer (CTO) for the United States

The conference included over 300 attendees from 4 continents, 11 countries, and featured 60 speakers on 11 expert panels and 22 exhibitors.

==== 2007 ====
FOSI held its inaugural annual conference "Rights and Responsibility: Child Protection in a Web 2.0 World" on December 6, 2007 at the Ronald Reagan Building in Washington, D.C. The conference was covered by C-SPAN.

Notable speakers included Google Vice President and Chief Internal Evangelist Vint Cerf, U.S. Ambassador David Gross, U.S. Federal Communications Commission Commissioner Deborah Tate and Federal Trade Commission Chairman Deborah Platt Majoras.

Sponsors for the Conference include Verizon, AT&T, GSMA, RuleSpace, Crisp Thinking, Symantec, Google, Blue Coat, Comcast, CTIA, Microsoft, CompTIA, AOL and InternetSafety.com.

=== 2013 events ===
- On June 24, 2013, the Family Online Safety Institute and Telstra partnered to host a forum titled Global Digital Citizenship: Encouraging Safe and Responsible Online Use. The event was held at Telstra’s head office in Melbourne, Australia, and provided the opportunity for participants to engage with other members of industry, academics, government officials, and the non-profit sector and openly discuss the issues, challenges, and opportunities that arise in online safety. In addition to sponsorship by Telstra, this event was further supported by Microsoft, Google, and the Australian Communications and Media Authority (ACMA).
- On May 15, 2013, the Family Online Safety Institute hosted its annual European Forum at Google’s EU Headquarters in Dublin, Ireland.

=== 2012 events ===
- On September 19, 2012 FOSI hosted a roundtable discussion in London, UK to discuss the topic of "Trends in Online Safety: The Trans-Atlantic Debate and its Global Implications". Bringing together a wide range of stakeholders, from industry, law enforcement, government and civil society, this off-the-record discussion provided an opportunity for the exchange of ideas, opinions, strategies and priorities.
- On August 9, 2012 FOSI and the Association for Competitive Technology hosted a panel discussion at the Rayburn House Office Building to brief lawmakers, staff, and interested parties about the FTC's amended proposed changes to the Children's Online Privacy Protection Act (COPPA). The title of the panel was "Congressional Briefing: Apps, Ads, Kids & COPPA; Implications of the FTC’s Additional Proposed Revisions."
- On May 15, 2012 FOSI gathered at the European Parliament Building in Brussels, Belgium for a one-day European Forum covering "Safety and Privacy in a Digital Europe." The event was designed to bring together the European Commission, Parliament, key industry players and civil society for informal discussions. Attendees included members of the European Parliament and European Commission such as Lambert van Nistelrooij, Khalil Rouhana, Christine Kormann, Seán Kelly, and Mary Honeyball.
- On March 6–7, 2012 FOSI and ictQATAR partnered to host a two-day conference called "Promoting Online Safety and Cyber Ethics in the Middle East" in Doha, Qatar looking at key online safety issues affecting the Middle East region and discussing broader global issues. Conference highlights included discussions about the expansion of mobile phone and social media usage, a look at the role of ICT in schools and the importance of cyber ethics, and also included the presentation of Qatar’s National Cybersafety Strategy. The event included a large number of international speakers including David Gross, Fadi Salem, Larry Magid, Claudia Selli, and Luc Delany.

=== 2011 events ===
- On February 24, 2011 FOSI hosted a joint event with Google titled "Breaking Digital Dependency: Tips for Balancing Digital Life and Real Life". The event included a lively discussion between Stephen Balkam and William Powers, author of Hamlet's Blackberry, covering a wide range of topics from Plato to Gutenberg and from the virtues of technology to its overuse.
- On September 14, 2011 FOSI launched the results of "Who Needs Parental Controls?” a survey indicating that the majority of parents use tools and rules to control their kids’ online usage. According to the research, virtually all parents have spoken to their children about online safety and established household rules. Following a presentation of the newfound data by Hart Research associate Abigail Davenport, a panel composed of representatives from sponsor companies AT&T, Google, Microsoft and Verizon, and moderated by Adam Thierer of the Progress and Freedom Foundation, discussed the possible implications of the results.
- On October 12, 2011 FOSI partnered with TechFreedom to host a luncheon panel at the Reserve Officers Association with a number of leading experts to discuss the Federal Trade Commission's recently proposed revisions to the Children's Online Privacy Protection Act (COPPA). Phyllis Marcus of the Federal Trade Commission gave opening remarks before joining a panel moderated by Berin Szoka, President of TechFreedom. The full list of panelists included: Jim Dunstan of TechFreedom, Dona Fraser of the Entertainment Software Rating Board, Kathryn Montgomery, American University, and Rebecca Newton of Mind Candy.
- On December 23, 2011 FOSI partnered with Microsoft to host a panel discussion on "Kids, Privacy, & Online Drama" at the Microsoft Innovation and Policy Center. Here, a panel of experts came together to discuss the ways young people interact online, how they manage their privacy, and common misconceptions of adults when it comes to cyberbullying. The panelists included danah boyd and Alice Marwick of Microsoft Research, and Amanda Lenhart from the Pew Internet & American Life Project.

=== 2010 events ===
- On May 27, 2010 FOSI held its second European Conference in Madrid, Spain titled, "Putting the Pieces Together: Building a Comprehensive Online Safety Plan". In attendance were approximately 250 people and 40 speakers from more than 12 countries; the conference was hosted by Telefonica and sponsored by AT&T, Rulespace and Nominum.

Topics of discussion included:

  - Online Responsibility and Safer ICT Use - Does the Self Regulatory Framework Promote 21st Century Citizenship?
  - Taking Control of Your Data - Staying Safe while Social Networking, Micro-blogging & Photo Sharing
  - TechTalk as aids to safety: What's Coming Down the Track?
  - The Collaborative Efforts of Law Enforcement, Industry and Government in Online Child Protection
  - How can we Better Promote the Safer Use of ICTs in Latin American Countries?
  - Can Parents and Carers Supervise Everything Kids do Online?
  - The New Breed of Location Services - Privacy and Safety Concerns for children and young people.
  - Future Dialogue - Alliances and Partnerships to help Families Stay Safer.
- On April 26–28, 2010 FOSI hosted its first Gulf Conference in Manama, Bahrain. FOSI hosted the conference in partnership with the Telecommunications Regulatory Authority of the Kingdom of Bahrain; there were over 250 attendees from 15 countries. The goal of the conference was a national consensus in online safety and was the first of its kind in the Gulf region.

=== 2009 events ===
- FOSI Wireless Conference: hosted with CTIA on April 22, 2009, "Keeping Kids Safe in a Mobile Environment." The conference focused on the challenges kids face in a mobile online environment and the vital role education plays in keeping them safe. Topics included: "From Wired to Wireless: Challenges & Opportunities for Safety," "Research Update: What Kids Are Doing on Their Wireless Devices," "Technical, Privacy, and Legal Issues with Children's Safety," and "Tools for Parents: Strategies and Technologies for Wireless Kids."
- FOSI Inaugural International Conference "Global Digital Citizenship: Encouraging Safe and Responsible Online Use" was held in Paris on September 16, 2009 to emphasize the importance of safe and responsible online use. The one-day European Conference designed to bring together key industry figures, experts, government representatives and the wider stakeholder community, to discuss how to ensure a continued and successful international push for global digital citizenship and safe and responsible online use. Generously sponsored by AT&T and supported by France Telecom, it brought together the key voices in the international Internet stakeholder community. They looked at the Western world challenges that universal broadband coverage creates for the Internet industry and how corporate responsibility is evolving to meet them. Conference sessions explored the response of industry, government and charitable to the issues that less developed nations face as they try to provide internet access to their citizens. Sessions focused on digital citizenship, media literacy, privacy, technology solutions and their impact on internet safety, location-based services and wireless safety efforts, and safe online use in developing countries.
- Throughout 2009, FOSI held a series of round-table discussions hosted with the law firm, Womble Carlyle called "Wednesdays with Winston" that started a dialogue about what is happening at the U.S. Federal Communications Commission (FCC) and the Federal Trade Commission (FTC) with regard to online safety and privacy issues.
- Supported by AT&T, FOSI held a series of monthly online safety panels entitled "Online on Fridays" on Capitol Hill in Washington, DC for legislators, staffers, educators, and industry representatives. Panels covered pressing online safety issues including sexting, legislating safety, and education.

=== 2008 events ===
- On March 20, 2008, the Berkman Center for Internet & Society at Harvard University, Google, and FOSI co-hosted the Washington, D.C. launch for Professor Jonathan Zittrain's book, The Future of the Internet and How to Stop It. Yale University Press. April 14, 2008. ISBN 978-0-300-12487-3. Zittrain, a professor of Internet Law at both the Berkman Center and the Oxford Internet Institute at the University of Oxford spoke to the over 100 attendees, which included representatives from government, NGO, and the corporate sector. Professor Larry Lessig of Stanford University also spoke to the group and Stephen Balkam of FOSI led the group in a question and answer session.
- On April 7, 2008, FOSI and the National Cable & Telecommunications Association (NCTA) hosted a special screening of the PBS Frontline Documentary 'Growing Up Online'. After the screening, 'Growing Up Online' producer Rachel Dretzin and Stephen Balkam took questions from the audience. Following the question and answer session, FOSI hosted a roundtable to discuss the state of online safety education.
- On June 12, 2008, FOSI and the Oxford Internet Institute cohosted a lecture and reception titled 'Beyond Byron—Towards a New Culture of Responsibility'. At this lecture, Dr. Tanya Byron and Professor John Palfrey of the Berkman Center for Internet & Society spoke. Dr. Byron spoke about the Byron Review, the report commissioned by Prime Minister of the United Kingdom Gordon Brown released on March 27, 2008.
- On June 13, 2008, FOSI and the Oxford Internet Institute cohosted a roundtable titled 'Educating Rita 2.0—Effective Methods and Messages in Online Safety Education'. This was the second part in FOSI's Online Safety Education Initiative roundtable series. Being held in the UK, it allowed FOSI to hear about the European and international perspective on online safety education. Dr. Tanya Byron opened the event. Notable panelists included Robin Blake, Media Literacy Manager of the Office of Communications (OfCom) in the UK and Claudine Menashe-Jones of the Childcare Division of the Department for Children, Schools and Families of the British Government.

=== 2007 events ===
- The official United States launch of FOSI was held on February 13, 2007 at the Kaiser Family Foundation in Washington, D.C. The event drew attendees from the government, online industry, NGOs, academics, and think tanks. Some of the attendees included Federal Communications Commission Commissioner Deborah Tate, Amanda Lenhart from Pew Internet and American Life Project (a division of the Pew Research Center), and Adam Thierer from the Progress and Freedom Foundation. The event included several welcome addresses and two roundtables, titled "The Chicken or the Egg — Which comes first: technology or public policy?" and "Educating the Lost Generation: Reaching today's parents with relevant online safety messages". The roundtables were chaired by Thierer and Anne Collier of Net Family News respectively.
- The official European launch of FOSI was held on February 22, 2007 at the House of Commons in London. The event also drew attendees from the government, online industry, NGOs, academics, and think tanks. Home Office Minister Vernon Coaker gave a welcome speech at the event.
- On June 13, 2007, FOSI held a Mexican conference in Mexico City, hosted by Telmex. Mexico's first lady Margarita Zavala was among the speakers.
- On September 26, 2007, Telefonica and FOSI co-hosted several educational training workshops titled "Interactive Generations: Growing Up In a Virtual World". The events drew participants from government, industry, NGOs, and others, who all discussed their views on new technology on children and family life. The workshops, which coincided with Telefonica becoming a member of FOSI, were hosted by Arturo Canalda, the Madrid Children's Rights Ombudsman.

== Internet Content Rating Association ==
In 2007, FOSI was created and subsumed the Internet Content Rating Association (ICRA) and its day-to-day operations. ICRA developed and implemented a content labeling system that allows webmasters to clearly and accurately label their websites. These labels identify content in accordance with criteria developed by an independent third party. In accordance with FOSI goals, ICRA does not serve to rate the content of websites. ICRA provides the labeling system and encourages content providers to self-rate.

=== Discontinuation ===
In October 2010, the ICRA labeling engine was discontinued by FOSI. FOSI has withdrawn all support for the ICRA rating system and taken down all documentation for labeling websites with ICRA ratings.
