= Stephen Balkam =

American businessman

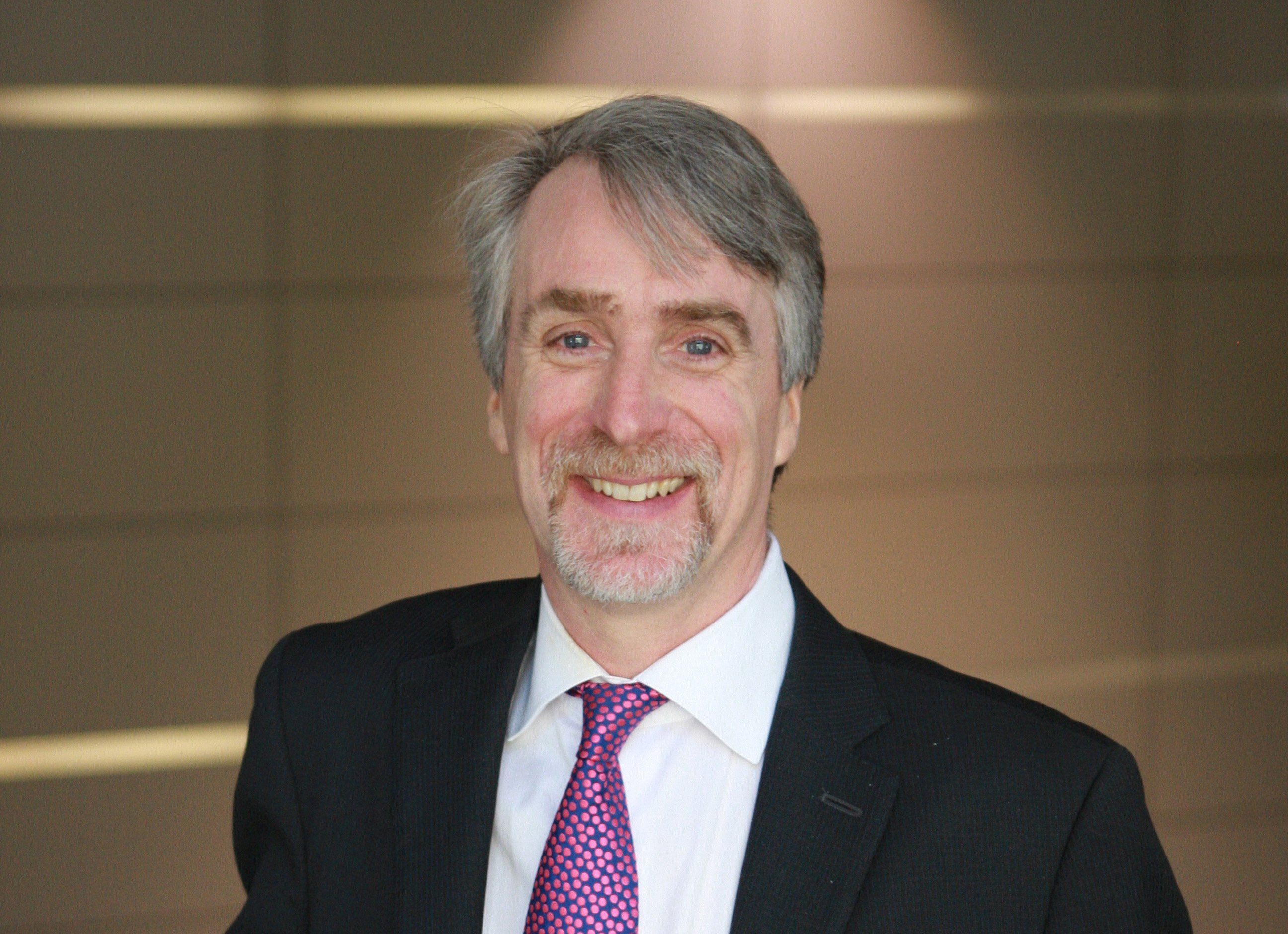
- Balkam in 2016
- Born: Washington, DC
- Education: University College Cardiff, Wales
- Occupation: CEO Family Online Safety Institute

Stephen Balkam is an American writer, policy advocate, and nonprofit leader. Balkam is the founder and CEO of the Family Online Safety Institute (FOSI). FOSI's mission is to make the online world safer for kids and their families. FOSI convenes the top thinkers and practitioners in government, industry and the nonprofit sectors to collaborate, innovate and create a Culture of Responsibility in the online world.

Balkam sits on the Facebook Safety Advisory Board, the Snap Safety Advisory Board, a member of the Future of Privacy Advisory Board, Twitter's Trust and Safety Council and the Congressional Internet Caucus Advisory Committee (ICAC). Balkam is a moderator of the Aspen Institute's Socrates Program and has led seminars in Aspen, CO as well as in Spain, Serbia and Japan.

== Education ==
Balkam received a BA, magna cum laude, in psychology from Cardiff University in Wales in 1977. A native of Washington, D.C., he spent many years in the UK and now has dual citizenship.

== Career ==
Balkam was the founder and CEO of the Internet Content Rating Association (ICRA) and led a team which developed the world’s leading content labeling system on the web. While with ICRA, he served on the US Child Online Protection Commission (COPA Commission), a congressionally appointed panel mandated by the Child Online Protection Act that was approved by Congress in October 1998. The primary purpose of the Commission was to "identify technological or other methods that will help reduce access by minors to material that is harmful to minors on the Internet."

In 1994, Balkam was named the first Executive Director of the Recreational Software Advisory Council which created a unique self-labeling system for computer games and in 1996 launched RSACi – a forerunner to the ICRA website labeling system. Balkam was invited as a representative of the RSAC to the first and subsequent White House Internet Summits during the Clinton Administration.

In 2008 Balkam, was invited to join the Internet Safety Technical Task Force headed by the Berkman Center for Internet and Society at Harvard Law School. The task force was "comprised of leading Internet businesses and organizations", and focused on "identifying effective online safety tools and technologies that can be used by many companies across multiple platforms". The final report, "Enhancing Child Safety and Online Technologies", was released on January 14, 2009. Balkam was also a member of Point Smart, Click Safe, a coalition of tech companies and child advocacy groups which originally convened in June 2008 and released a report in July 2009 encouraging industry self-regulation and education efforts rather than legislation as the best way to keep children safe online.

Balkam’s other positions include the Executive Director of the National Stepfamily Association (UK); General Secretary of the Islington Voluntary Action Council; Executive Director of Camden Community Transport as well as management positions at the Institute of Contemporary Arts (London) and Inter-Action. Balkam’s first job was with Burroughs Machines (now Unisys) and he worked briefly for West Nally Ltd, a sports sponsorship PR company.

=== In The Press ===
Balkam writes regularly for the Huffington Post, has appeared on nationally syndicated TV and radio programs such as MSNBC, CBS, NPR and the BBC and has been interviewed in the mainstream press, including leading newspapers such as the Washington Post, New York Times, The Wall Street Journal and The Guardian. Balkam has given presentations and spoken in over 20 countries on 4 continents.

== Honors ==
For his efforts in online safety with the RSAC, he was awarded the 1998 Carl Bertelsmann Prize in Gutersloh, Germany, for innovation and responsibility in the Information Society.

In 2000, Balkam was named one of the Top 50 UK Movers and Shakers by Internet Magazine.
