= Lenner =

Lenner is a surname. Notable people with the surname include:

- Anne Lenner (1912–1997), English singer

== See also ==
- Lennert (disambiguation)
