= Lukas Smits =

Dutch painter (born 1935)

- Born: 23 May 1935 (age 91); Ravenswaaij, Netherlands
- Education: Academy of Art and Design, Den Bosch; Jan van Eyck Academy, Maastricht
- Known for: Art
- Movement: Schijt aan Schilderkunst (Bollocks to Painting, SAS), 1963
- Awards: Royal Subsidy for Painting, (1959), City of Maastricht Prize (1962), Royal Subsidy for Painting (1962), Travel grant, French government, (1964)

Lukas Smits (born 23 May 1935 in Ravenswaaij) is a Dutch painter.

Lukas Smits was born in Ravenswaaij (Buren) and studied both at the Academy of Art and Design in Den Bosch and at the Jan van Eyck-Academy in Maastricht. In 1959 he received the Royal Subsidy for Painting, which was followed by the City of Maastricht Prize (1962), another Royal Subsidy for Painting (1962) and a travel grant from the French government (1964). Smits travelled to Spain, Italy (regularly), France, Mexico, the United States and Indonesia to complete his studies. He specialised as painter, collagist, draftsman, designer and sculptor.

Among his works, non-figurative mixed media wall–paintings, glass mosaics, and wooden and metal sculptures can be seen with the number three as a constant element. Three is an important number for Smits, as it disposes the amount of different media mixed on the art work (three media), the parts in which the composition is divided (tripartite composition), and the physicality of the support (triptych). The subject-matter of Smits’ work explores the relationship between nature and culture. In this sense, he explored culture itself in a daily life context with the exhibition.

Smits attempted with Ad Snijders and Johan Lennarts to bring art closer to people and make it more understandable.

Smits has worked as a lecturer at the Fine Arts Academy in Tilburg and has collaborated in environment projects. He has also been a member of the Brabantse Stichting voor Beeldende Kunst en Edelambacht and of the B.B.K. Amsterdam. Smits has displayed his work in the Barreira Galerry, Valencia, Spain and in the Loewy Galerie, Los Angeles, United States, in Arti en Amicitiae, Amsterdam and the Centre Cultureel, Toulousse, France (1986), in the Galerie Traject, Utrecht (1988), and in La Passarelle des Arts, Chambourcy, France (1999) and both the municipalities of Eindhoven and Amsterdam acquired work by him (Amsterdam possesses Z.W. Kwadraat’ 1977 and Schilderij’ 1978-’ 80). In addition, he has also participated in group exhibitions, being the most remarkable the following ones: the Stedelijk Museum Het Prinsenhof, Delft (1963), the Stedelijk Van Abbemuseum, Eindhoven (1963 and 1968), and the Museum Fodor, Amsterdam (1978–1979). Lukas Smits currently lives and works in Amsterdam and Kamerik.

== See also ==
- History of painting
- Western painting
