= BumperCar =

Macintosh browser for children

- Developer(s): Freeverse Software
- Initial release: 2004-05-04
- Stable release: 2.1.1 / 2006-09-25
- Operating system: Mac OS X
- Type: web browser
- License: Shareware
- Website: http://www.freeverse.com/bumpercar2/

BumperCar is a Mac OS X web browser by Freeverse Software that is aimed at kids. BumperCar contains extensive parental controls including filtering, personal information blocking, whitelists, blacklists, time limits and full support for ICRA tags. Version 2 is based on WebKit as well as some technologies from The Omni Group.
