= Williams, Indiana =

Williams, Indiana may refer to:

- Williams, Adams County, Indiana, an unincorporated community in Root Township
- Williams, Lawrence County, Indiana, an unincorporated census-designated place in Spice Valley Township
