= Donald F. Roberts =

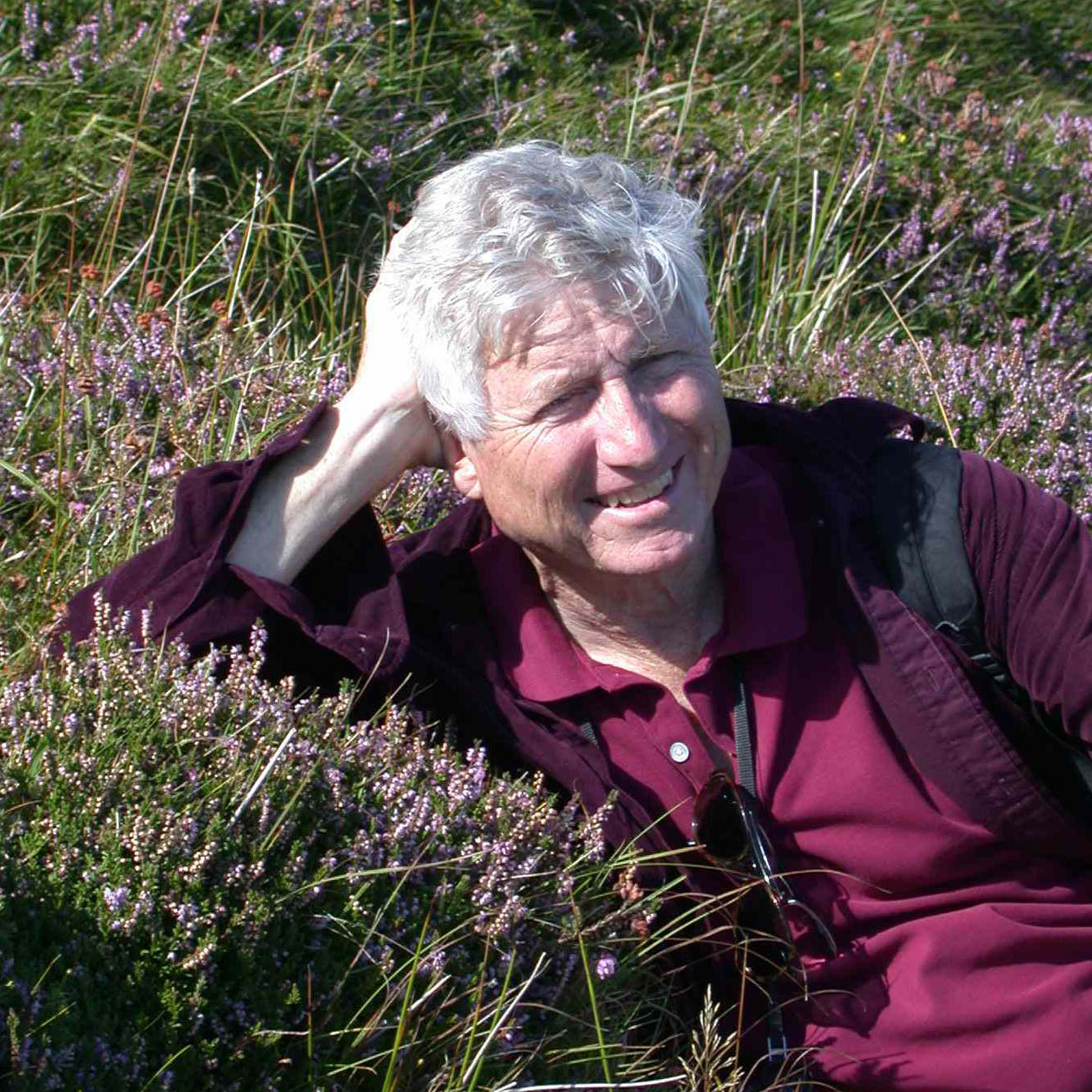
Don Roberts in the Blasket Islands, September 2003.

Donald F. Roberts (born March 30, 1939) is the Thomas More Storke Professor Emeritus in Communication at Stanford University.

Roberts studied at Columbia University, where he received his B.A. in 1961, at the University of California, Berkeley, where he earned an M.A. in 1963, and at Stanford University. He received his Ph.D. from Stanford in 1968 and joined the Stanford faculty at that time. At Stanford, he was Director of the Institute for Communication Research (1985–1990 and 1999–2001), and chair of the Department of Communication (1990–1996). He retired in 2006.

Much of Roberts' research concerns the effects of media on youth. A notable study coauthored by Roberts and Ulla Foehr for the Kaiser Family Foundation found that, at the turn of the millennium, U.S. children spent the equivalent amount of time to a full-time job watching television and other media, and a later follow-on study by Roberts and others coined the name "Generation M" for the youth of the day after discovering that they were packing even more media into their schedules by multitasking. Roberts also studied depictions of drug use and violence in media, and took part in 1997 U.S. Senate hearings on violent music lyrics. Roberts' research provided the foundation for the content rating systems of the Recreational Software Advisory Council, of which he was a board member, and its successor organization the Internet Content Rating Association. Roberts also served as the psychological and educational consultant for the television series He-Man.

== Books ==
- The Process and Effects of Mass Communication, 2nd ed. (with Wilbur Schramm). University of Illinois Press, 1971, ISBN 978-0-252-00197-0.
- It's Not Only Rock & Roll: Popular Music in the Lives of Adolescents (with Peter G. Christenson). Hampton Press, 1998, ISBN 978-1-57273-142-4.
- Substance Use in Popular Music Videos, Diane Publishing Co., 2001, ISBN 978-0-7567-3386-5.
- Kids and Media in America: Patterns of Use at the Millennium (with Ulla G. Foehr). Cambridge University Press, 2003, ISBN 978-0-521-52790-3.
