= Lehnert =

Lehnert is a German surname. Notable people with the surname include:

- Adolf Lehnert (1862–1948), German sculptor and medal designer
- Andreas Lehnert, German clarinetist
- Hildegard Lehnert (1857–1943), German painter
- Jürgen Lehnert (born 1954), East German sprint canoeist
- Katharina Lehnert (born 1994), Filipino-German tennis player
- Konrad Lehnert, American experimental physicist
- Michael R. Lehnert, retired major general of the United States Marine Corps
- Pascalina Lehnert (1894–1983), German Roman Catholic sister
- Rajmund Lehnert (born 1965), German cyclist
- Rudolf Franz Lehnert (1878–1948), Austrian photographer
- Wendy Lehnert, American computer scientist

== See also ==
- Lehnert v. Ferris Faculty Association
- Klaus Lehnertz (1938–2026), German pole vaulter
