= Lenaerts =

Lenaerts and Lenaers are Dutch patronymic surnames most common in Belgium. Lenaert is an archaic Dutch form of Leonard. People with this surname include:

Lenaerts

- Anneleen Lenaerts (born 1987), Belgian harpist, sister of Wouter
- Henri Lenaerts (1923–2006), Belgian sculptor and painter
- Koen Lenaerts (born 1953), Belgian judge, President of the European Court of Justice
- Toon Lenaerts (born 1983), Belgian football defender
- Wouter Lenaerts (born 1981), Belgian conductor and composer, brother of Anneleen
- Yves Lenaerts (born 1990), Belgian football goalkeeper

Lenaers

- Anja Lenaers (born 1972), Belgian racing cyclist
- Jeroen Lenaers (born 1984), Dutch CDA politician and MEP
- Roger Lenaers (1925–2021), Belgian Jesuit pastor in Austria
- Victor Lenaers (1893–1968), Belgian racing cyclist
- William M. Lenaers (born c.1950), United States Army general

== See also ==
- Bram Leenards (born 1940), Dutch water polo player
- Johan Lennarts (1923–1991), Dutch painter and sculptor
- Sint-Lenaarts, village in the community of Brecht, Antwerp
- Lennart, a surname and given name
