= Lennart Axelsson =

Lennart Andersson may refer to:

- Lennart Axelsson (musician) (born 1941), Swedish musician
- Lennart Axelsson (politician) (born 1952), Swedish politician
