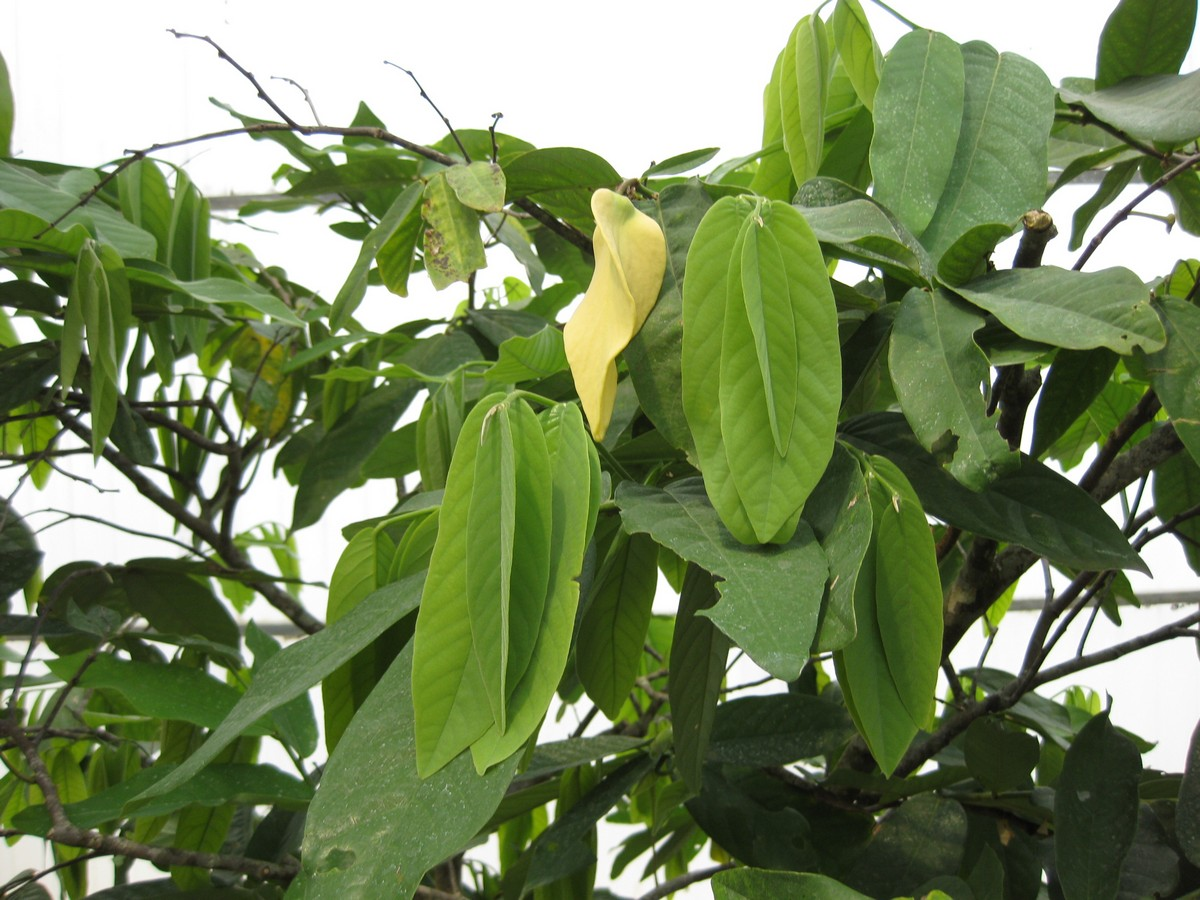
- Dasymaschalon blumei var. 'suratense Bân'

Scientific classification
- Kingdom: Plantae
- Clade: Tracheophytes
- Clade: Angiosperms
- Clade: Magnoliids
- Order: Magnoliales
- Family: Annonaceae
- Tribe: Uvarieae
- Genus: Dasymaschalon (Hook.f. & Thomson, 1855) Dalla Torre & Harms, 1901

Synonyms
- Pelticalyx Griff.

= Dasymaschalon =

Genus of flowering plants

Dasymaschalon is an Asian genus of bushy plants in the subfamily Annonoideae and tribe Uvarieae. Its native range is from southern China, Indo-China to Malesia (west of the Wallace line).

== Morphology ==
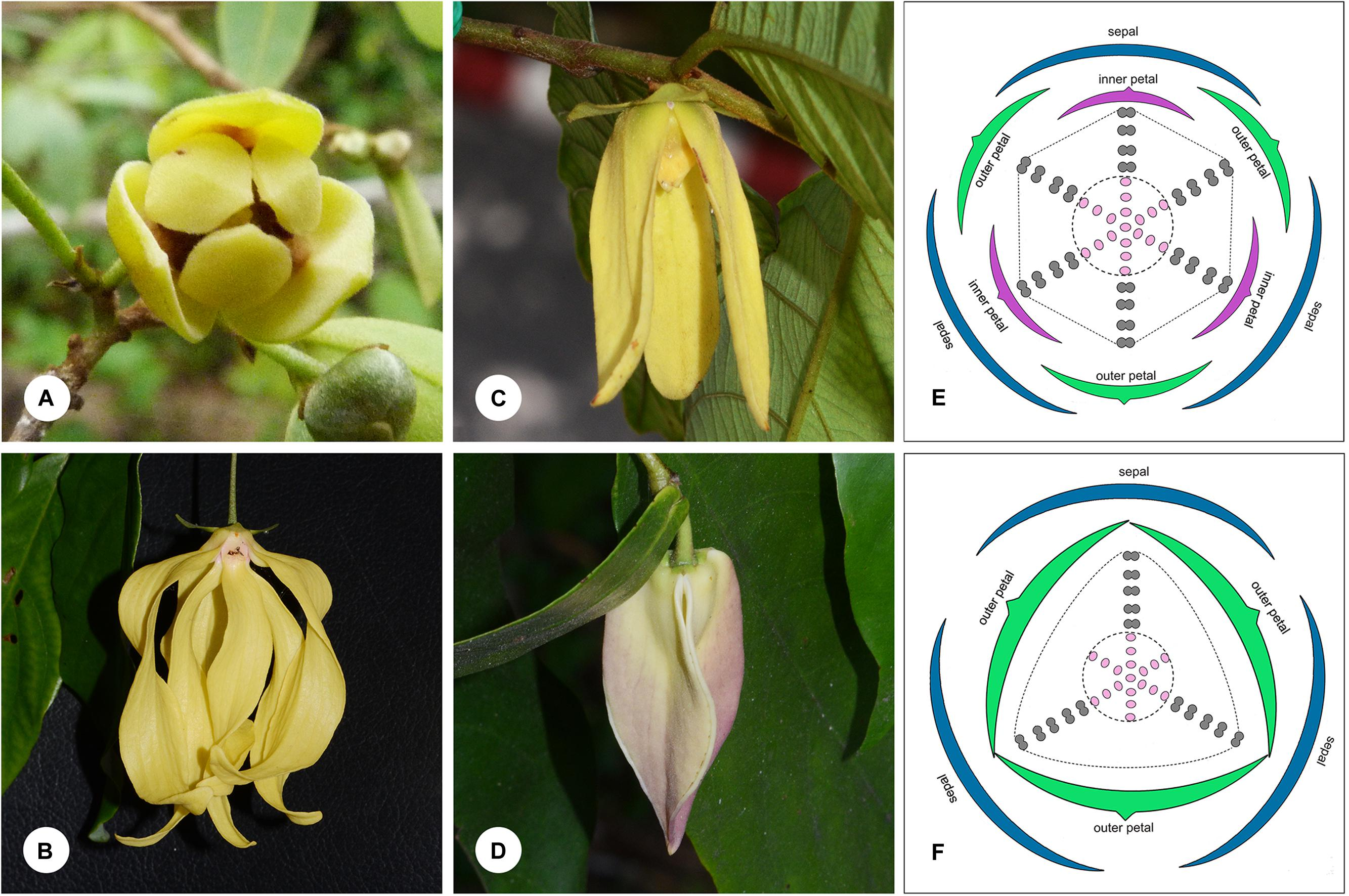
Figure 1 (see section text).

FIGURE 1. Floral morphology in the Dasymaschalon alliance. (A) Monanthotaxis buchananii, showing loosely coherent pollination chamber. (B) Desmos chinensis, with partially closed chamber formed by petals that are basally constricted. (C) Friesodielsia desmoides, with outer petals free spreading, inner petals apically connivent forming a closed pollination chamber. (D) Dasymaschalon dasymaschalum, with three outer petals apically connivent forming a closed pollination chamber. (E) Floral diagram of Friesodielsia. (F) Floral diagram of Dasymaschalon. Colors are used to differentiate floral organs; blue, sepal; green, outer petal; purple, inner petal; gray, stamen; pink, carpel. The ranks and total numbers of stamens and carpels are artificial in (E, F), with six/three lines of stamens and carpels shown at the corners of the hexagonal/triangular floral meristem.

== Species ==
Plants of the World Online currently includes:

- Dasymaschalon acuminatum Jing Wang & R.M.K.Saunders
- Dasymaschalon angustifolium Jing Wang & R.M.K.Saunders
- Dasymaschalon bachmaensis N.S.Lý, T.H.Lê, Vuong & N.D.Do
- Dasymaschalon borneense Nurmawati
- Dasymaschalon clusiflorum (Merr.) Merr.
- Dasymaschalon dasymaschalum (Blume) I.M.Turner - type species
- Dasymaschalon echinatum Jing Wang & R.M.K.Saunders
- Dasymaschalon ellipticum Nurmawati
- Dasymaschalon evrardii Ast
- Dasymaschalon filipes (Ridl.) Bân
- Dasymaschalon glaucum Merr. & Chun
- Dasymaschalon grandiflorum Jing Wang, Chalermglin & R.M.K.Saunders
- Dasymaschalon hirsutum Nurmawati
- Dasymaschalon lomentaceum Finet & Gagnep.
- Dasymaschalon longiflorum (Roxb.) Finet & Gagnep.
- Dasymaschalon longiusculum (Bân) Jing Wang & R.M.K.Saunders
- Dasymaschalon macrocalyx Finet & Gagnep.
- Dasymaschalon megalanthum (Merr.) Jing Wang & R.M.K.Saunders
- Dasymaschalon minutiflorum (Nurmawati) Jing Wang & R.M.K.Saunders
- Dasymaschalon robinsonii Ast
- Dasymaschalon rostratum Merr. & Chun
- Dasymaschalon sootepense Craib
- Dasymaschalon tibetense X.L.Hou
- Dasymaschalon trichophorum Merr.
- Dasymaschalon tueanum Bân
- Dasymaschalon wallichii (Hook.f. & Thomson) Jing Wang & R.M.K.Saunders
- Dasymaschalon yunnanense (Hu) Bân
