= Root Township, Adams County, Indiana =

Root Township
- Township
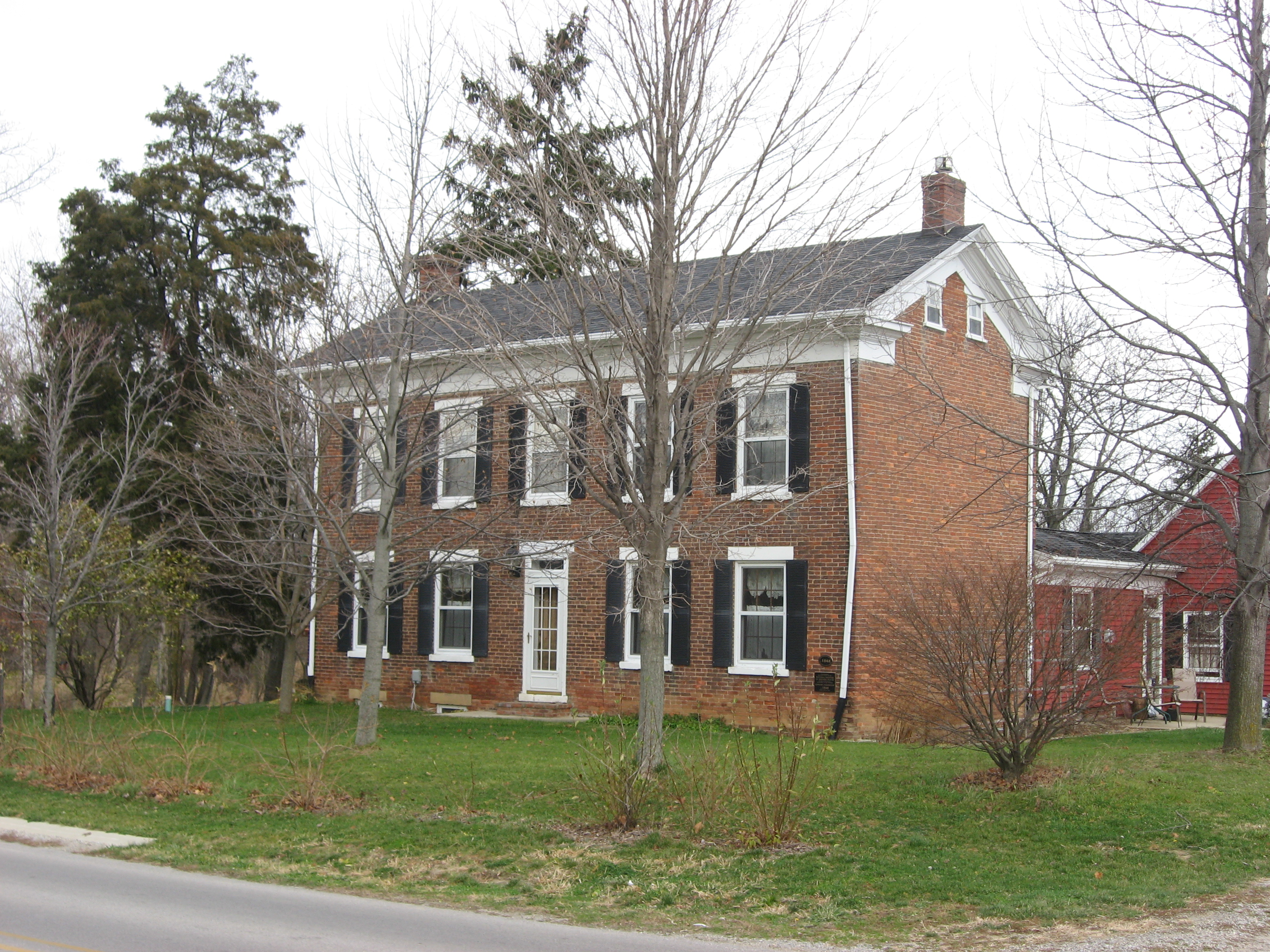
- The Lenhart Farmhouse, a historic site in the township

- Location in Adams County
- Coordinates: 40°52′44″N 84°56′32″W
- Country: United States
- State: Indiana
- County: Adams

Government
  - Type: Indiana township

Area
  - Total: 35.57 sq mi (92.1 km^{2})
  - Land: 35.44 sq mi (91.8 km^{2})
  - Water: 0.12 sq mi (0.31 km^{2}) 0.34%
- Elevation: 814 ft (248 m)

Population (2020)
  - Total: 6,033
  - Density: 125.3/sq mi (48.4/km^{2})
- Time zone: UTC-5 (Eastern (EST))
  - Summer (DST): UTC-4 (EDT)
- ZIP code: 46733
- Area code: 260
- GNIS feature ID: 453812

Root Township is one of twelve townships in Adams County, Indiana. As of the 2020 census, its population was 6,033, up from 4,443 at the 2010 census.

== Geography ==
According to the 2010 census, the township has a total area of 35.57 square miles (92.1 km^{2}), of which 35.44 square miles (91.8 km^{2}) (or 99.63%) is land and 0.12 square miles (0.31 km^{2}) (or 0.34%) is water.

=== Cities, towns, villages ===
- Decatur (north quarter)

=== Unincorporated towns ===
- Monmouth
- Williams

=== Adjacent townships ===
- Madison Township, Allen County (north)
- Monroe Township, Allen County (northeast)
- Union Township (east)
- St. Marys Township (southeast)
- Washington Township (south)
- Kirkland Township (southwest)
- Preble Township (west)
- Marion Township, Allen County (northwest)

=== Cemeteries ===
The township contains these cemeteries: Alpha, Evans Family, Kunkel Family, Monmouth, Pleasant Valley, Reynolds, St. Joseph Catholic, St. Peter Lutheran, Union Chapel Methodist and United Brethren.

=== Major highways ===
- US 27
- US 33
- US 224

=== Lakes ===
- Saddle Lake

=== Landmarks ===
- Hanna City Park

== School districts ==
- North Adams Community Schools

== Political districts ==
- Indiana's 6th congressional district
- State House District 79
- State Senate District 19
