= Lennert =

Lennert may refer to:

- Emilie Lennert (1931–2019), Greenlandic politician
- Karl Lennert (1921–2012), German physician and pathologist
- Lennert lymphoma, a T-cell lymphoma

== See also ==
- Lehnert, a German surname
- Lennart, a German and Scandinavian given name
