= Lenhart Farmhouse =

Historic house in Indiana, United States

- U.S. National Register of Historic Places
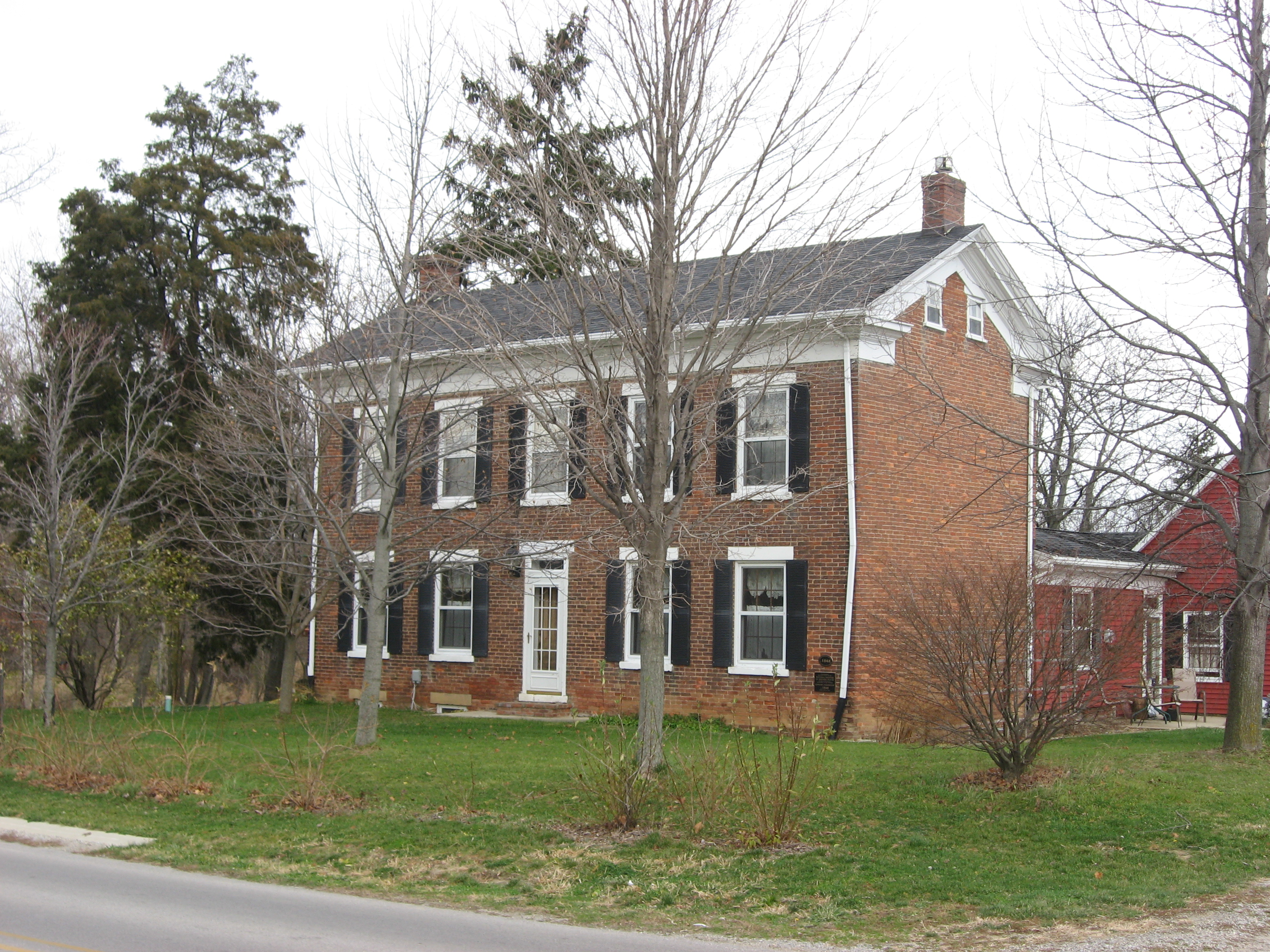

- Location within Adams County, Indiana Location within Indiana Location within the United States
- Location: 6929 N. Piqua Rd., Decatur, Indiana
- Coordinates: 40°50′47″N 84°55′12″W
- Area: 1.7 acres (0.69 ha)
- Built: 1848
- Architectural style: Federal, Greek Revival
- NRHP reference No.: 02000688
- Added to NRHP: June 27, 2002

Lenhart Farmhouse is a historic farmhouse in Root Township, Adams County, Indiana. It was built about 1848, and was listed on the National Register of Historic Places in 2002.

The property includes the historic Piqua Road, County Road 100E and the creek (Caffee Legal Drain) The 1.67-acre home site is located on a knoll overlooking river bottomland of the St. Marys River.

== Federal "I" house ==
The Lehnart Farmhouse is a primitive Federal I-house with Greek Revival details. It is a two-story masonry house with a gable roof and a rear masonry ell extension off of the west front room.

On the east side of the ell was a 9-by-18-foot (2.7 by 5.5 m) porch. The porch was enclosed as a kitchen and a bedroom addition was built northeast side of the home between 1925 and 1931.

=== Structure ===
The exterior and interior walls are of three-brick-thick, common bond brick walls including a brick foundation and cellar. The structure prior to 1925 had only one timber-framed wall. That wall is the partition wall of the front foyer/stairwell, which divides the west front room from the foyer. In 1925 when the porch was enclosed the walls were framed with standard 2x4 wood studs 16 inches OC. The framed edition of 1925 was extended 8 feet in 1995 to meet the garage that was built on the property in 1993. The front elevation has 10 symmetrical openings on the first and second floors, five windows on the second story and two windows on each side of the front door.

The lintels and sills are all limestone in the masonry structure. The replacement windows are six-over-six double hung units matching identically the original wood window intact in the east side of the masonry ell. This window in the east side of the masonry ell is one of six windows with rough-hewn wood lintels and sills. The other four are the attic windows. In addition are two small single pane cellar windows with two brick window wells. The three panel walnut front door has a three-pane transom ventilation window.

The 7/12-pitched roof was originally shake shingles and is now finished in asphalt shingles with large flush end chimneys. The large wooden soffit has a massive decorative cornice that is consistent in size and presentation on the masonry walls as well as the wood framed walls on all elevations of the home. Common Bond is an arrangement of four to six stretcher courses between single header courses.

==== West side ====
The west gable end of the "I" house and west side of the ell is one wall as indicated by the continuous brick pattern present from roof to foundation. This would indicate that the ell was integral part of the design and original construction. A cellar door is the only opening in the west gable end of the "I" house. The west portion of the ell has two openings a door and a window. The lintel and sill is limestone. The window is six-over-six double hung.

==== North side ====
The north side of the home shows the masonry structure with a chimney and the framed porch enclosure and bedroom addition that was initiated in 1925 as well as the north gable side of the garage built in 1993. The large wooden soffit has a massive decorative cornice that is consistent in size and presentation on the masonry walls as well as the wood-framed walls on all elevations of the home.

There are two windows that are vinyl-clad wood, with the sash being six-over-six double hung. The west side of the wood-framed bedroom addition from 1925 and garage from 1993 can be seen with 4-inch vinyl lap siding. One door opening exists in the north side of the framed area. An attic window opening is centered in the gable end of the north side of the garage.

==== East side ====
The east view of the house shows the original masonry construction on the southeast portion of the structure as well as the framed bedroom addition initiated in 1925 and garage built in 1993 on the northeast portion with 4-inch vinyl lap siding. There are two openings in the home: a window opening and a door opening in the framed addition. The window is vinyl-clad wood with the sash being six-over-six double hung. The large wooden soffit has a massive decorative cornice that is consistent in size and presentation on the masonry walls as well as the wood-framed walls on all elevations of the home.

==== Interior ====
The interior of the Lenhart Farmhouse is a perfectly symmetrical Federal "I" House design with a central three-story walnut staircase and balustrade from the first floor to the attic. The east, west and ell room interior dimensions are 15 by 18 feet (4.6 by 5.5 m). Typical finishes include plaster and simple woodwork. Chair rails are found throughout the first floor "I" House rooms. The ash floorboards are of irregular widths from 4 to 8 inches wide. The walnut mopboards and quarter round are simply stated finishes to the plank floors. The interior doors on the first floor are three-panel walnut, and the exterior doors are two-panel poplar structurally designed with wooden pegs. All door jams and trim are poplar. The east fireplace is intact, with a large unadorned walnut mantle with only simple moldings. The west fireplace has been bricked and plastered over; none of the mantle remains. From evidence of the craftsmanship and plaster, it is conjecture by the author that the east fireplace was covered at the time of the c. 1925 enclosure of the porch. A stove access in the ell room has been bricked and plastered and a stove removed from that room in 1991.

The walnut staircase and balustrade starts in the front hall with a heavy turned newel post that goes through the ash plank flooring secured onto a heavy rough hewn beam in the cellar ceiling. The staircase has four landings: one at the second and attic floors and two located between floors. Windows are located on two of the four landings providing light and a view north and south of the property. The railing is carved in sections gracefully turning at each landing and finally ending in the attic. The attic flooring is of milled 1-inch oak up 18 inches in width. The floor and ceiling joists are all of milled oak 2 inches × 8 inches and 2 inches × 4 inches, respectively.

The porch that was enclosed in c. 1925 is a 9-foot × 18-foot kitchen. The 20-by-22-foot (6.1 by 6.7 m) bedroom addition of c. 1925 was renovated c. 1955 as a rear hall and full bath. The bath has a reproduction Victorian claw and ball tub installed in 2018. In 1998 an 8-foot extension connected the home with the garage and a utility room, coat closet and half bath were added. The custom doors in the addition are all four-panel with custom milled trim sympathetic to the "I" house woodwork and mopboards.

==== Second Floor ====
The second-floor bedrooms symmetrically located on the east and west sides of the "I" house are identical in size and proportion, 15 by 18 feet (4.6 by 5.5 m). They each have random-width plank floors. A dividing wall partition was added in 1991 providing symmetrical 5-foot × 15-foot closet area in each room and a full bath in the east room. The bath remodeled in 2012 with distressed cherry cabinetry and a claw tub. The two panel walnut doors, hardware and trim used for the closets were salvaged from a timber-framed home in 1991.

==== The Cellar ====
The cellar floor was replaced in 1995. At that time it was determined that the brick walls were continuous foundation walls. A walnut cellar stair begin with a landing under the first-floor staircase near the kitchen and descends into the cellar. The last tread of the original cellar stair was removed due to water damage, and the remaining stringer was repaired with an oak stringer extension with oak risers and treads.

== Creek ==
The creek was historically known as "Lenhart’s Run" as cited 1918 in the Adams County Commissioners records. The creek is a natural tributary of the St Marys River. The Native Americans called the river "Nameewa Siipiiwi" in the Myaamia (Miami) language meaning, Sturgeon River. The proximity of the Lenhart Farm to the St. Marys River and Lenhart's Run provided the rich agricultural soil. Historically this location was prized as "Bottomland of the first quality." The home sits on a knoll overlooking the watershed of the river. The dwelling site is located on what we now know as the 500-year flood plain. The creek is now known as "Caffee Legal Ditch."

== Property history ==
=== BF Blossom ===
The Lehnart Farmhouse property began with a patent issued in 1836 from President Andrew Jackson to Benjamin Franklin Blossom of Van Wert County, Ohio. In 1822, Blossom had moved to Ohio from Monmouth, Maine with his family. Blossom bought and sold additional land tracts in Adams Country over the coming years, However, he did not build on the Lehnart Farmhouse site

Blossom played a significant role in the settlement of Adams County in 1836. It is thought that Monmouth, Indiana, was named after his hometown in Maine. Blossom served as the first elected School commissioner of Adams County in 1837.

=== John Lehnart ===
On November 4, 1845, John Lehnart purchased the Lehnart Farmhouse site from Blossom. A native of Westmoreland County, Pennsylvania, Lehnart and his wife Rebecca (Burl) had ten children Lawson, John, Sarah, Peter, Catherine, Mary and Elizabeth (twins), Joseph, Ann and William. The family camped out for two weeks on their new property beside a large oak log while building a cabin.

The cabin was made of round logs and scotched down on the inside, a puncheon floor, clapboard roof and a mud fireplace. They lived in this house while John built the original farm house.

Lenhart was elected County Commissioner in 1842, 1843 and 1844. He was listed as a prominent citizen who was on the roster of the 1854 Agricultural Members. This organization supported an agricultural fair that was successful until the Civil War and then was discontinued. His work ethic and high standards remain a legacy to the community.

Lenhart built a model farm on the property. The following is quoted from the Abstract of Title concerning the real estate description for the purpose of the Lenhart Executor's sale. "The undersigned would further state that the above land constitutes what is known as the Lenhart farm, on the North bank of the St. Marys River about a mile from Decatur. The farm has upon it a good brick dwelling, a good orchard, a frame barn, corncribs and other outbuildings. It has never failing springs, also a sand and gravel back upon it; also a stone quarry, in the bed of the river. This farm is mostly bottomland of the first quality."

=== The Dailey family ===
Nimrod Dailey and his wife Rosannah purchased the property from the Lehnart family for $11, 500.00 on October 11, 1880. After Daily died on February 5, 1886, Rosannah and the children moved to Decatur, renting the property. When Rosannah died in January 1919, her kept the property. The additional 77 years that the farm remained in the family the land and house was occupied by tenants. Dailey family eventually sold the house but kept the tillable acreage.

A tenant of the home was Fred Weidler, who rented the home from 1925 to 1931. It was between 1925 and 1931 that Weidler enclosed the back porch of the original structure to use as a kitchen and built an addition to the house to serve as a bedroom.

=== Later owners ===
On October 7, 1963, John and Letha Hutchison purchased the Lehnart farmhouse from the Dailey family. The purchase also included six acres on the north side of Piqua Road.. Pm February 13, 1968, the property was sold to Clois D. and Winona F. Eichar.

Neither of these owners significantly changed the brick home. However, during the ownership of the Eichers the remaining outbuildings on the home site fell into disrepair and they demolished them. A building that was destroyed was a well-known milk house built near the spring on the north side of the home. The spring water was run into the milk house and the continuous stream of cool water chilled the milk.

On July 20, 1991, Julie K. Sheets O’Beirne purchased the home, orchard and spring from the original homesite. The home had been unoccupied for several years and was in a distressed condition.

O’Beirne restored the home to a functional residence. Significant changes to the property or structure since 1991 include: garage built in 1993, replaced concrete floor in the cellar 1995, kitchen, bath, utility area extended 8’ to the garage in 1998 and horse stable built in 2000.
