= Harms =

Harms or Härms is a surname. Notable people with the surname include:

- Chris Harms (born 1956), Australian cricketer
- Claus Harms (1778–1855), German evangelical minister
- Daniil Harms (1905–1942), English transcription: Daniil Kharms, Russian writer
- Friedrich Harms (1819–1880), German philosopher
- Hermann Harms (1870–1942), German botanist
- Johann Oswald Harms (1643–1708), German painter, engraver and scenic designer
- Lars Harms (born 1977), Swiss squash player
- Lars Harms (born 1964), German politician
- Lennart Harms (born 1991), German politician
- Mihkel Härms (1874–1941), Estonian ornithologist
- Monika Harms (born 1946), German Attorney General
- Rebecca Harms (born 1956), German politician and filmmaker
- Robert W. Harms (born 1946), American historian
- Robert T. Harms (1932–2016), American linguist

== See also ==
- Harms (policy debate), policy debate stock issue
- T.B. Harms & Francis, Day & Hunter, Inc., an American music publisher
