= Ad Snijders =

Dutch artist and social activist

- Born: 12 May 1929; Eindhoven, Netherlands
- Died: 25 February 2010 (aged 80); Eindhoven, Netherlands
- Education: Autodidact, La Grande Chaumière
- Known for: Painting
- Movement: Expressionism, Modern Art

Ad Snijders (born 1929 in Eindhoven) was a painter, collagist and social activist.

== Education ==
Snijders started drawing at the age of twelve and had his first solo exhibition when he was twenty years old, catching the attention of the press. After two months in the School of Applied Arts in Eindhoven, he left and went on working as an autodidact artist. In 1961 and 1962, the French Government prized Snijders with a grant, which led him to study in La Grande Chaumière Paris.

== Work ==
His art went ahead of the prevailing movements; he created CoBrA Art before encountering CoBrA works, advanced Pop Art and went even ahead of the return to oil painting in the eighties. As a painter, he first executed expressionistic canvases flooded with drippings (until 1965), then he experimented with drawing (1977), watercolour, gouache, oil and acrylic painting (1976–1988). Ad Snijders explored the field of sculpture with assemblages and collages (since 1965) and mixed media (since 1974). His style has fluctuated between expressionist, figurative and abstract in very material works.

Aside of the plastic experimentalism of his works, Snijders was a highly committed artist to society. He co-created the exhibition Schijt aan Schilderkunst (Bollocks to Painting, 1963) with Johan Lennarts and Van der Heyden in the gallery Pijnenborg (Eindhoven). The goal of the exhibition was provoking the not only the audience but the art world proposing an art that would make questions instead of providing answers. The following exhibition he co-created was called "Tot lering en vermaak" (1970) and Johan Lennarts and Lukas Smits participated in it as well. This time, the exhibition took place in the "Van Abbe Museum" and the exhibiting space was decorated as a private house. With the question "Does art in the museum still make sense?" the artists revolutionized the art world once more.

In addition to this, the artist opened a gallery called Thornfield (1984) in the space under his studio. The idea was to provide young artists a place to show their work. He put on six exhibitions a year, concentrating on the work of younger artists. Snijders co-founded as well the "J66 Foundation" (1966–1972) to provide jazz musicians and visual artists with a platform in Eindhoven to collaborate and influence each other mutually.

Furthermore, he kept on intensively working on his art, exhibiting at the Van Abbe Museum Eindhoven (1957, 1959, 1961, 1970, 1987), at the Stedelijk Museum Amsterdam 1958, at the Foundation De Krabbedans, Eindhoven (1958, 1960,'61), at the Museum Fodor Amsterdam (1963), at the Museum Jan Cunen, Oss (1986), and at the Galerie Willy Schoots, Eindhoven (1990) among others. Snijders became a member of the B.B.K. Amsterdam and died in Eindhoven on 25 February 2010.
