= Kent Lassman =

Think tank executive

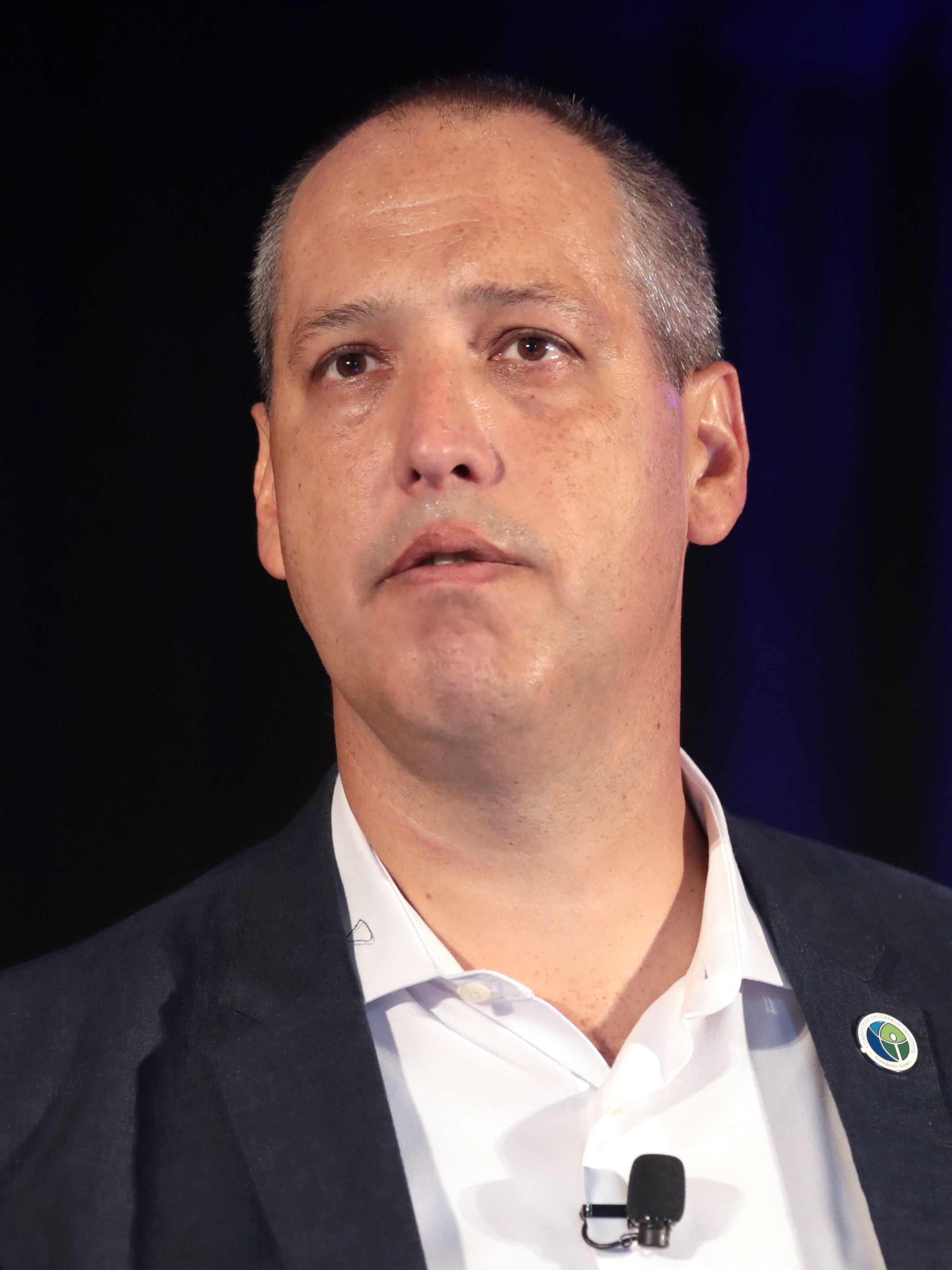
- Lassman in 2022
- Born: 1974 (age 51–52); Moline, Illinois
- Education: MPA
- Alma mater: The Catholic University of America, North Carolina State University
- Organization: Competitive Enterprise Institute
- Title: President and CEO
- Term: April 2016–present
- Spouse: Dana Damico
- Children: 4

Kent Lassman (born June 17, 1974) is the president and CEO of the Competitive Enterprise Institute, an American free market think tank. His analysis and commentaries focus on regulatory law and economics.

== Early life and education ==
Lassman was raised and educated in Geneseo, Illinois. In 1994 he began a career in public policy as a research assistant at the Progress and Freedom Foundation, one of the first technology-focused policy think tanks.

He holds a Bachelor of Arts in philosophy and politics from The Catholic University of America and a master's degree in public administration from North Carolina State University.

== Career ==
Lassman held a series of positions at free market organizations throughout the 1990s and 2000s. He was an American Swiss Foundation Young Leader in 2017, awarded the E.A. Morris Fellowship for Emerging Leaders in 2006 by the John Locke Foundation. and named an Abraham Lincoln Fellow in Constitutional Government at the Claremont Institute for 1998–2000.

At Citizens for a Sound Economy, Lassman authored Congressional testimony and policy analyses on emerging Internet policy, telecommunications regulation, and reforms of the Federal Communications Commission. At the Progress and Freedom Foundation, he was the founding director of a program to teach regulatory economics to state utility commissioners. He also led a campaign to get candidates in the 2000 United States presidential election to speak on internet issues. Since 2016, Lassman has led the Competitive Enterprise Institute.

In 2023, Lassman authored the chapter on free trade for the ninth edition of the Heritage Foundation's series Mandate for Leadership, which provides the policy agenda for Project 2025.

== Personal life ==
Lassman lives in Alexandria, Virginia with his wife Dana and 4 children. He is an endurance athlete who has competed in open-water marathon swimming, ultramarathon running, Xtreme triathlon, and Ironman triathlon. Since 2015 he has served on the board of Tri Equal, an organization dedicated to fairness and the development of gender equity in triathlon.

== See also ==
- Fred L. Smith
- Deirdre McCloskey
