= Monmouth, Indiana =

- Unincorporated community
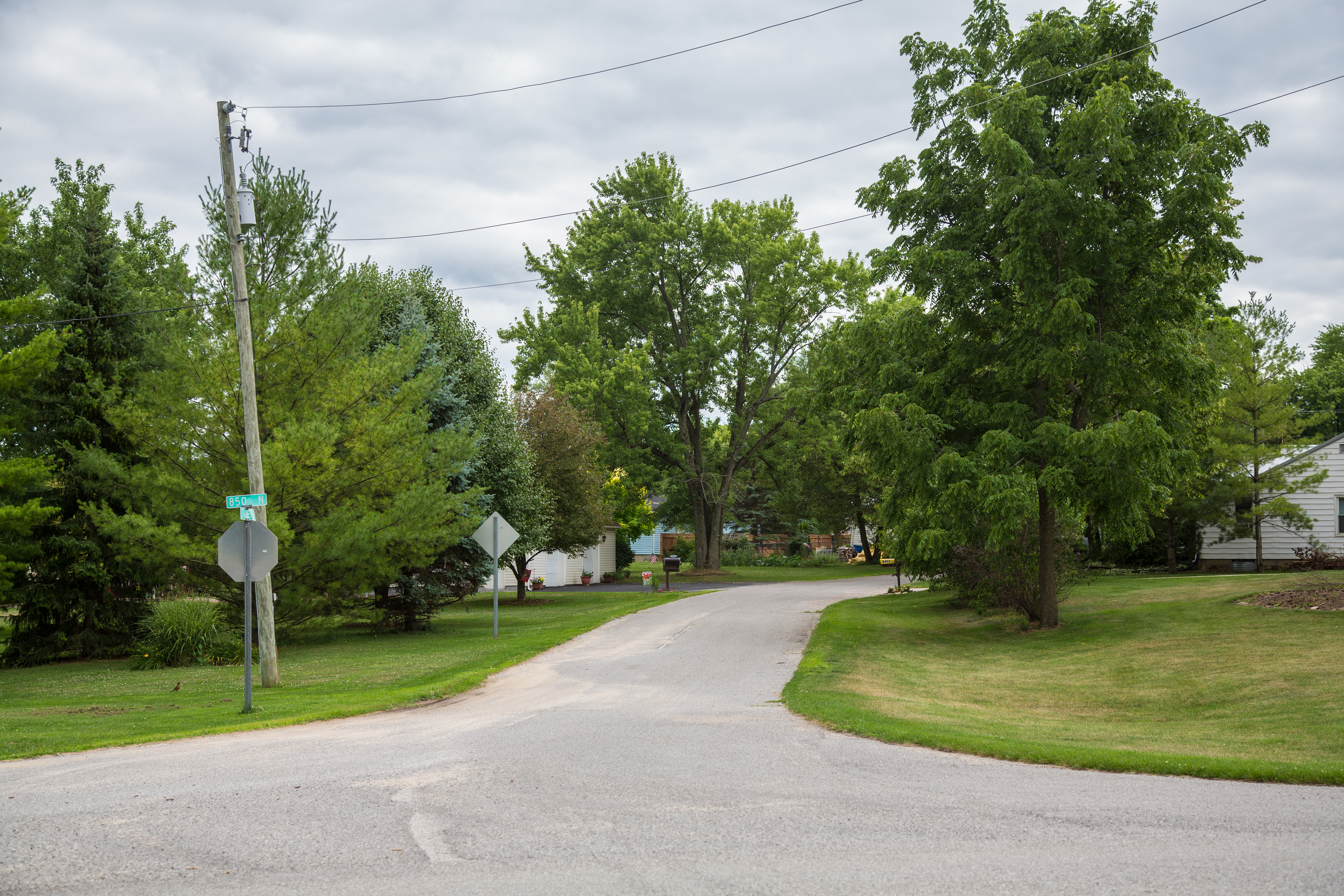

- Adams County's location in Indiana

- Location in Adams County
- Coordinates: 40°52′04″N 84°56′40″W
- Country: United States
- State: Indiana
- County: Adams
- Township: Root
- Named after: Monmouth County, New Jersey
- Elevation: 801 ft (244 m)
- Time zone: UTC-5 (Eastern (EST))
  - Summer (DST): UTC-4 (EDT)
- ZIP code: 46733
- Area code: 260
- FIPS code: 18-50130
- GNIS feature ID: 439330

Monmouth is an unincorporated community in Root Township, Adams County, in the U.S. state of Indiana.

== History ==
A post office was established at Monmouth in 1839, and remained in operation until it was discontinued in 1904. The community was named after Monmouth County, New Jersey.
