= Hotel Lenhart =

Historic hotel in California, United States

- U.S. National Register of Historic Places
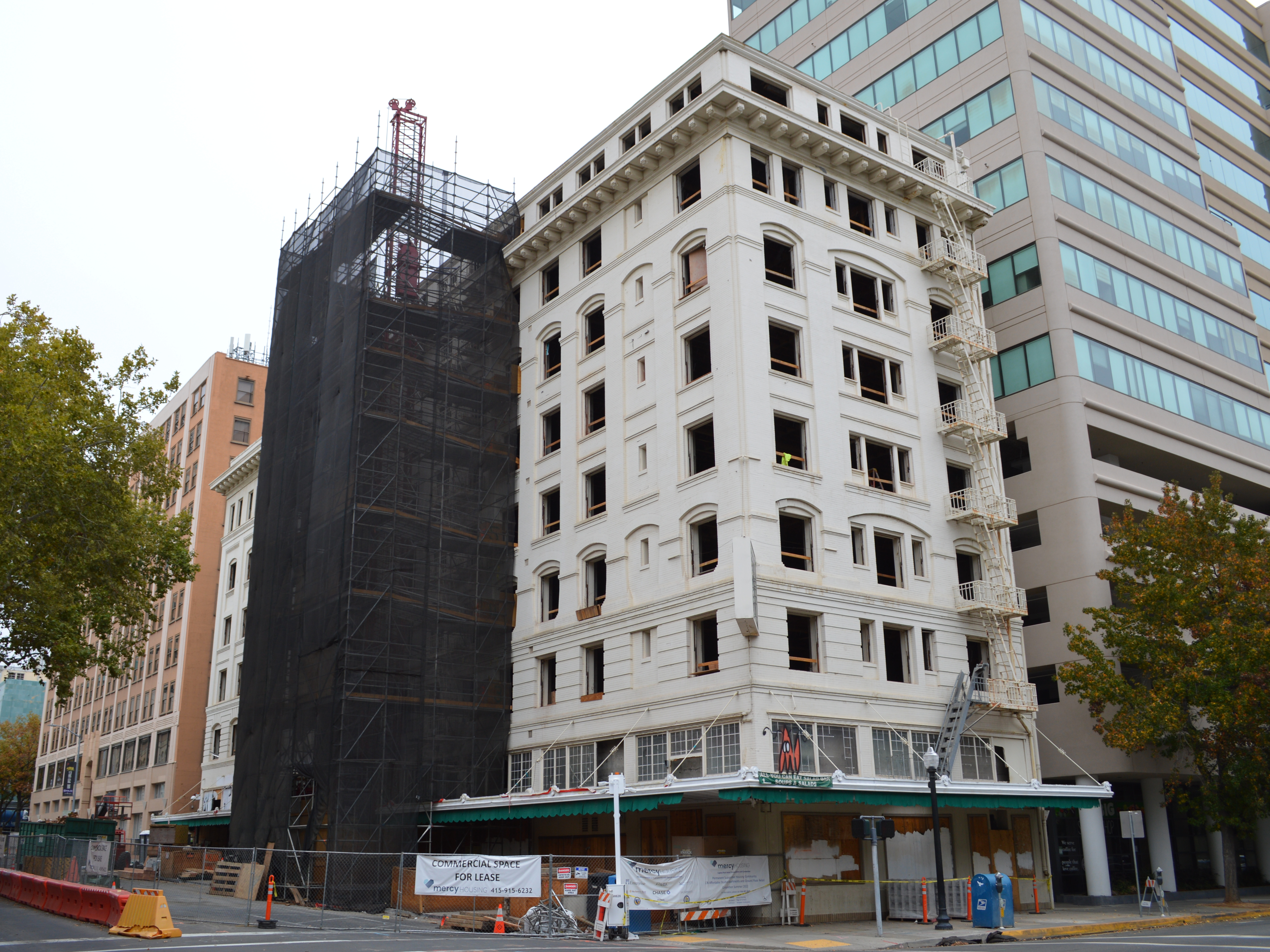

- Location within Sacramento, California Location within California Location within the United States
- Location: 1117-1131 9th St., Sacramento, California
- Coordinates: 38°34′43″N 121°29′44″W
- Area: 0.25 acres (0.10 ha)
- Built: 1911-1912
- Architect: Seadler & Hoen
- Architectural style: Italian Renaissance
- NRHP reference No.: 100006998
- Added to NRHP: September 22, 2021

The Hotel Lenhart located in Sacramento, California is a historic hotel designed in the Italian Renaissance Revival style by architect Seadler & Hoen. Originally two separate buildings, they were conjoined in 1933 and it became one of Sacramento's leading hotels. It operated as the Capitol Park Hotel from 1966 until 2024, when it reopened for permanent homeless housing, known as the Saint Clare at Capitol Park.
