= Stefan Lenhart =

German artist

Stefan Lenhart (born 1969) is a German artist based in Munich. His work is a mixture of sculpture, large scale installations and painting, often incorporating historical elements.

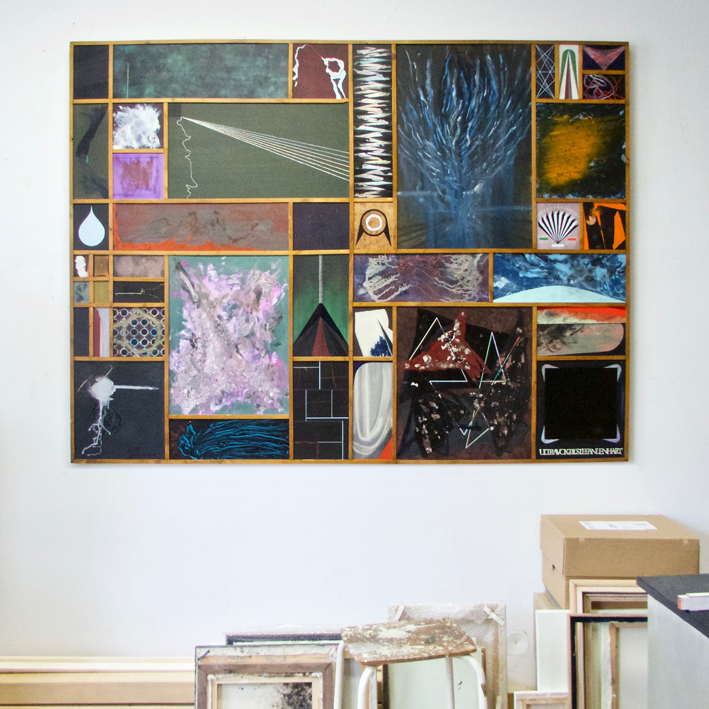
Ultravox (2010) by Stefan Lenhart, as on public display

== Life and education ==
Stefan Lenhart studied at the Academy of Fine Arts, Munich, graduating in 2007.

== Career ==
In 2007, Lenhart founded the alternative art project space Tanzschuleprojects, which ran till 2012. Notable exhibitions include the "Halbjahresgaben" series (2009-2011) which included work by Kalin Lindena, Daniel Man, Tim Bennett, Florian Meisenberg and Martin Wöhrl, and "Meisterwerke der Menschenheit" series (2007-2008) with Lone Haugaard Madsen and Claudia Wieser.

In 2015, he organised an Artist March in honour of the young artists who died in 1881 in what is known as the Eskimotragödie.

A recent retrospective of his work was hosted by the Kunstverein Ebensberg in 2018, featuring his older large scale work as well as his newer paintings. Another exhibition of his paintings, Trojan Horse Power took place at the Kunstverein Erlangen in 2019. Three recent series of paintings were shown in the exhibition Insider for Outsiders at the Kunstverein Landshut in 2021.

In 2021, he founded the Munich band ALTE MENSCHEN, consisting of three visual artists and an art historian (Stefanie Ullmann, Stefan Lenhart, Lorenz Straßl and Daniela Stöppel). In 2022, they released their first single and performed live at the Theatron, Monacensia and Milla Club. The band themselves describe their style as "futuristicdadapunkblues".

A catalogue of his work, Melancholie al Dente, has been published by Distanz in 2012.

== Exhibition list ==
- 2008 Who is Who, Galerie Carol Johnssen, München
- 2009 Paradies, Diözesanmuseum, Freising
- 2009 Dark Fair, Kölnischer Kunstverein, Köln
- 2009 Kühle Analysen, Kunstmuseum, Celle
- 2010 The eternal reoccurrence of everything, Spacework, Los Angeles
- 2010 Ghosting the cities, Praterstr. 48, Wien
- 2010 No soul for sale, Tate Modern, London
- 2011 Ivorytowerclubmembers, Infernoesque, Berlin
- 2012 Phantom Eldorado, Kunstverein Heppenheim
- 2013 Konstrakt, Galerie Jahn, München
- 2014 Immersion Pact 1 & 2, Platform, München
- 2015 Germany, mon amour, Fondazione Giorgio Cini, Venedig
- 2016 Anthophobia, Artothek, München
- 2016 fruits of the dawn, GiG, München
- 2018 Ghost Evacuation, Kunstverein Ebersberg
- 2018 New Forms of Beauty, Smolka Contemporary, Wien
- 2019 Trojan horse Power, Kunstverein Erlangen
- 2021 Insider for Outsiders, Kunstverein Landshut
