= Ravenswaaij =

- Village
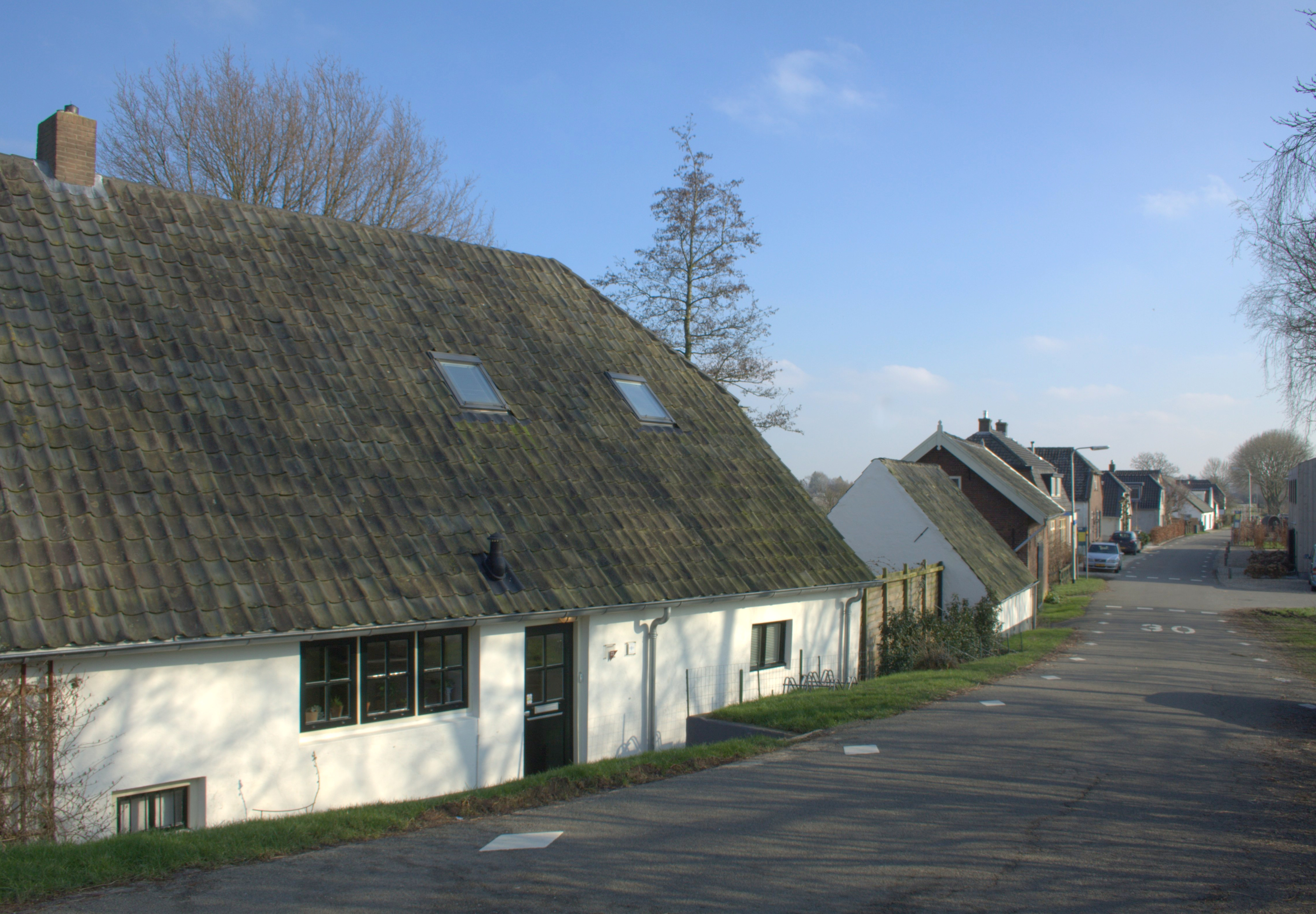
- Street in Ravenswaaij

- Location in the province of Gelderland Ravenswaaij (Netherlands)
- Coordinates: 51°57′N 5°20′E
- Country: Netherlands
- Province: Gelderland
- Municipality: Buren

Area
  - Total: 11.52 km^{2} (4.45 sq mi)
- Elevation: 4 m (13 ft)

Population (2021)
  - Total: 645
  - Density: 56.0/km^{2} (145/sq mi)
- Time zone: UTC+1 (CET)
  - Summer (DST): UTC+2 (CEST)
- Postal code: 4119
- Dialing code: 0345

Ravenswaaij is a village in the Dutch province of Gelderland. It is a part of the municipality of Buren, and lies about 10 km northwest of Tiel.

It was first mentioned in 1139 as Raueneswade, and means "fordable place of Raven (person)". Ravenswaaij started along the Lek River. A linear settlement appeared on the river dike. The church was destroyed in 1573 by the Spanish troops. The current church dates from 1644. In 1840, it was home to 368 people.

== Gallery ==
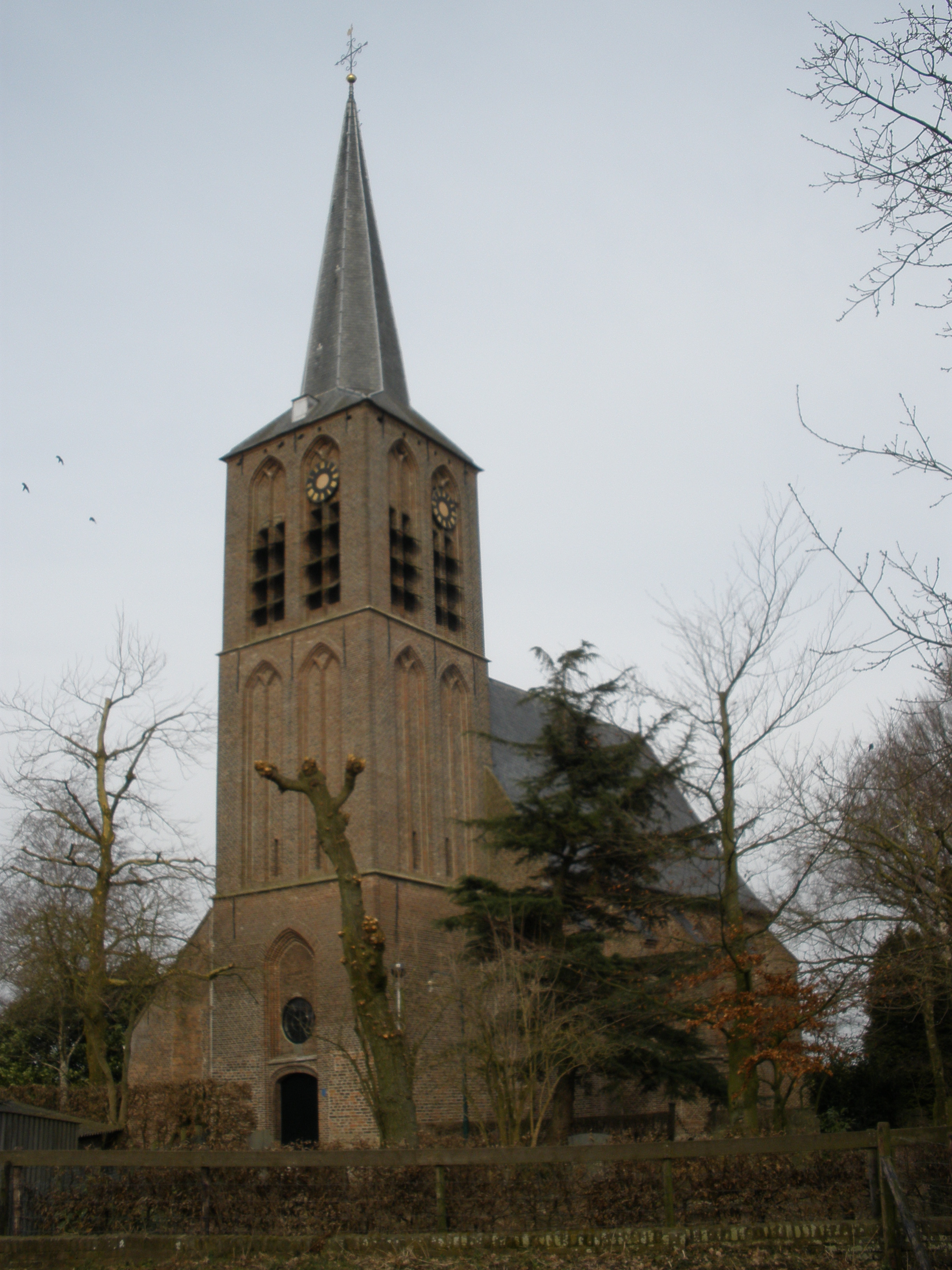
Saint Nicolas Church

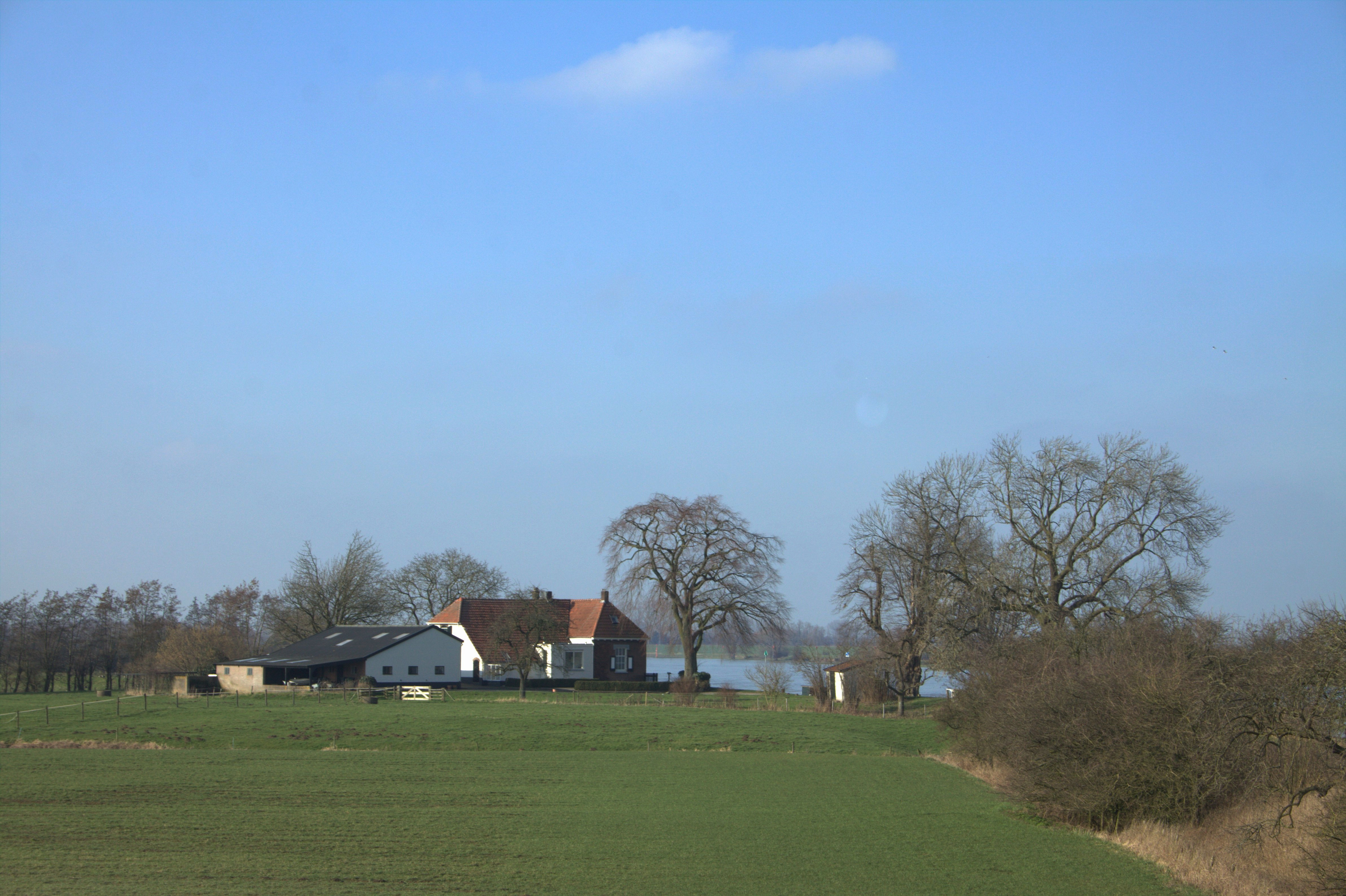
Farm in the overflow area of the Lek River

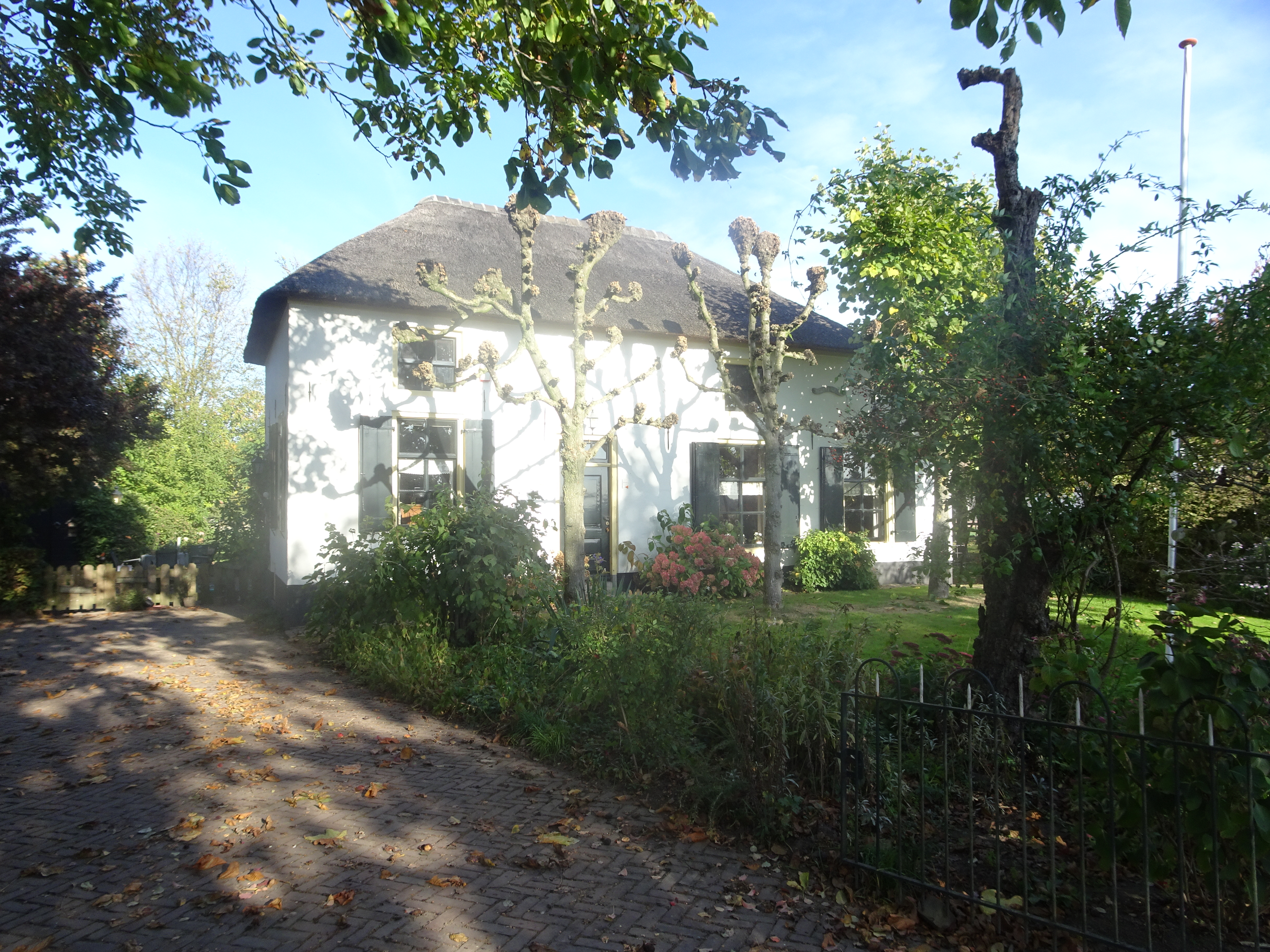
Farm in Ravenswaaij
