= Lenhart Schubert =

American artificial intelligence researcher

- Education: University of Toronto
- Known for: EPILOG, KNEXT
- Scientific career
- Fields: Artificial Intelligence, Natural Language Processing, Knowledge Representation, Inference, Planning
- Workplaces: University of Alberta; University of Rochester

Lenhart Karl Otto Schubert is a professor of Computer Science at the University of Rochester, as well as a member of the Center for Language Sciences and the Center for Computation and the Brain. Schubert is a prominent researcher in the field of common sense reasoning.

== Biography ==
Schubert received his Ph.D. from the University of Toronto in 1970. He was on the faculty of the University of Alberta between 1973 and 1988 and joined the faculty at the University of Rochester in 1988. He was elected fellow of Association for Advancement of Artificial Intelligence in 1993 for "fundamental contributions in NLP, esp. in the formalization, representation, and practical implementation of non-first order concepts".
