= Johan Lennarts =

Dutch painter

- Born: 18 December 1932; Strijp, Eindhoven, Netherlands
- Died: 1991 (aged 58–59); France
- Education: Self-taught, Tilburg Art Academy
- Known for: Art
- Movement: Vrije Expressieven (Free Expressive, 1950s); Schijt aan Schilderkunst (Bollocks to Painting, 1963)

Johan Lennarts (1932–1991-10-06) was a Dutch artist.

Johan Lennarts was born on 18 December 1932 in Strijp, Eindhoven, the youngest one of a family with five children. He used to paint as a child and even won the consolation prize in a contest for the school, but later on he gave up the art creation. Lennarts survived the Second World War and in 1945 he attended the Beekvliet seminary in Sint Michielsgestel to become a monk. In 1948 he attended the Joris College in Eindhoven and four years later he started to draw again during his final year at the HBS (Former Dutch High School), receiving already in 1959 a grant from the French government. Although he enrolled first at the Royal Academy of the Arts in den Bosch and after a short period of time he transferred to the Art Academy in Tillburg he can be considered a self-taught artist.

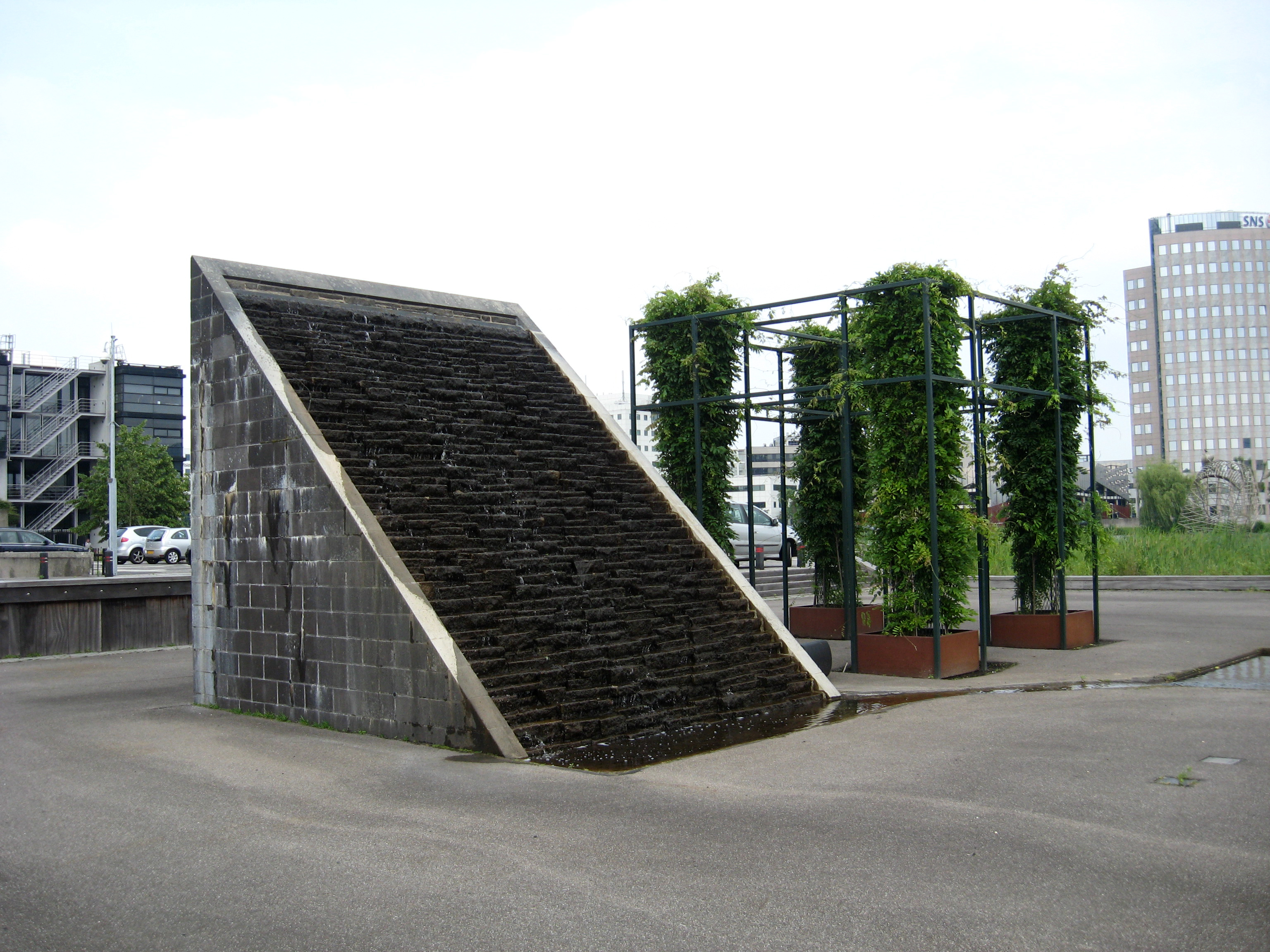
Flowing and Growing of Lennarts and Huub Hendrikx, on the roof of the provincalse seat in Den Bosch

The artist specialised in sculpture, glass-painting and canvas’ painting, and his favourite subjects were portraits, animals and flowers. Unlike his subjects, the styles and the painting techniques have changed along the years. Lennarts started working under the influence of CoBrA, joining efforts with the artist association and later art centre Vrije Expressieven (Free Expressive) in the 1956. In a decade later he constituted the anarchical collective Schijt aan Schilderkunst (Bollocks to Painting, SAS). It was by the exhibition titled after the SAS that Lennarts led the world see his fascination for the green colour, even producing his own “lennartsgreen”. After the American Pop Art he created collages, panels and polyptichs while he was also engaged with social projects. In 1970 another exhibition took place: Tot lering en vermaak (To education and enjoyment, Van Abbemuseum) in order to bring art closer to people and make it more understandable. Johan Lennarts, Ad Snijders and Lukas Smits organized the show and according to their conclusion that artists should be involved in planning the living environment, they decorated the exhibiting space as a private house.

The “second Lennarts” was born in the 1970s, when the artist presented cheerful landscapes executed in a calligraphic manner to the public. This period was marked by the artist’s philosophic readings of Ludwig Wittgenstein and Martin Heidegger and the questions that he posed to himself. Empty places populate the paintings of this second phase: polder landscapes, empty park stations, empty trains, parks and house interiors. His intellectual interests were also put down into words in a vast written corpus. Lennarts wrote poems, theatre plays and novels being prized by the city of Eindhoven incentive contest for his texts in Raam (1967) and by the same city for his novel Koekoeksklok in Utopia (A Cuckoo Clock in Utopia, 1985). His work has been on display in the Netherlands, Belgium, France, Surinam and several art works belong to the contemporary art collections of both the Stedelijk Museum in Amsterdam and Stedelijk Van Abbemuseum in Eindhoven. The artist belonged to the association BBK Amsterdam (1969–1981) and Arti et Amicitiae (1981–1991). Lennarts lived in Eindhoven until 1969, then in Griendtsveen (1976–1983), Amsterdam (1983–1987), and finally in France where he died in 1991.

Phillip Peters, in his book 'An Impressionist of the Human Condition', is quoted saying, “I believe that Lennarts depicted the human condition in the form of ‘fleeting moments’ (…) Lennart’s ‘snapshots’ of the human condition constitute a special representation of one of the great themes of mankind.”

== See also ==
- History of painting
- Western painting
