= Amanda Lenhart =

American media scholar

Amanda Lenhart is currently the Head of Research at Common Sense Media. Prior to that, she has worked as a program director at the non-profit research group Data & Society, and as an associate director and researcher at the Pew Internet & American Life Project. She has published numerous articles and research reports, many of which focus on teenagers and their interactions with the internet and other new media technologies.

== Education ==
Lenhart graduated magna cum laude from Amherst College with a double major in English and Anthropology. Lenhart also holds a Master's degree in Communication, Culture, and Technology from Georgetown University.

== Career ==
Amanda Lenhart spent 16 years working at the Pew Internet & American Life Project, authoring numerous reports. Lenhart's research work focuses primarily on children, teens, and families. She often wrote about young people and how they interact with the web and with different new fads that spring from the evolving technologies. Beyond researching teens, Lenhart helped found the internet team at the Pew Research Center.

Lenhart has been a frequent spokesperson on trends in Internet and mobile cell phone use. In The New York Times, Lenhart was quoted in articles such as "Technology Leapfrogs Schools and Jurisdictions", "Top Kitchen Toy? The Cellphone", and "Tweeting? Odds Are You Live in a City". The Washington Post has cited Lenhart in many articles, including "Sexting hasn't reached most young teens, poll finds", "U.S. teens report 'frightening' levels of texting while driving", and "New Research: Adults & Videogames". She has also been interviewed by multiple T.V. and radio sources. In 2003, Lenhart discussed net dropouts on the radio program "On the Media".

In 2006, Amanda Lenhart was a guest on the Talk of The Nation radio show, where she joined social networking researcher Danah Boyd and Internet safety expert Parry Aftab in a discussion about Myspace. In 2007, Lenhart joined danah boyd, Michele Ybarra, and Dr. David Finkelhor for a luncheon panel for the Advisory Committee to the Congressional Internet Caucus on online youth victimization. CBS cited Lenhart and posted her 2008 discussion with Larry Magid on game-playing. Also in 2008, Lenhart participated in a roundtable at the Association of Internet Researchers' Annual Conference in Copenhagen, including scholars Nancy Baym, Lewis Goodings, Malene Larsen, Raquel Recuero, Jan Schmidt, and Daniel Skog.

In 2009, Lenhart appeared on the "Kojo Nnamdi Show" where she discussed "the opportunities and hazards that come with using social networking sites." She also served as a guest on the radio program "Future Tense", where she discussed sexting.

In 2016, Amanda Lenhart joined the Associated Press-NORC Center for Public Affairs Research, she started part-time in September of that year before transitioning into a full-time position following the completion of her prior projects centered around youth in connection with education technology and news consumption.
