= Konrad Lehnert =

Konrad W. Lehnert
- Citizenship: United States
- Education: Harvey Mudd College (B.S., 1993); University of California, Santa Barbara (Ph.D., 1999)
- Known for: Quantum electromechanics
- Awards: Vannevar Bush Faculty Fellowship (2020); APS Fellow (2013); AAAS Fellow (2020); Kavli Fellow (2010, 2011)
- Scientific career
- Fields: Experimental physics; Quantum information science; Condensed matter physics
- Workplaces: Yale University; JILA; NIST
- Doctoral advisor: S. James Allen
- Website: physics.yale.edu/people/konrad-lehnert

Konrad W. Lehnert is an American experimental physicist and the Eugene Higgins Professor of Physics at Yale University. He has worked in quantum electromechanics, including cooling the motion of macroscopic mechanical oscillators to their quantum ground state, entangling mechanical oscillators with electrical circuits, and applying quantum-enhanced measurement techniques to searches for axion dark matter.

== Education and early career ==
Lehnert received his B.S. from Harvey Mudd College in 1993 and his Ph.D. in physics from the University of California, Santa Barbara in 1999, under the supervision of S. James Allen. His dissertation, titled "Nonequilibrium Dynamics in Mesoscopic Superconductor-Semiconductor-Superconductor Junctions," investigated AC Josephson effects in mesoscopic Nb-InAs-Nb junctions. He was a postdoctoral researcher at Yale University from 1999 to 2003, where he worked with Robert Schoelkopf on qubit structures built from superconducting circuits.

== Career ==
In 2003, Lehnert joined JILA, a joint institute of the University of Colorado Boulder and the National Institute of Standards and Technology (NIST), as an Associate Fellow. He was promoted to JILA Fellow in 2007 and served as JILA Chair from 2022 to 2024. At JILA, Lehnert established a research group studying microwave quantum circuits, mesoscopic electronics, and quantum nanomechanics. His group performs measurements of electrical circuits and mechanical oscillators that reach quantum-limited sensitivity.

In July 2024, Lehnert joined the faculty of Yale University as the Eugene Higgins Professor of Physics.

== Research ==
=== Quantum electromechanics ===
Lehnert's research centers on building electrical and electromechanical devices that exhibit quantum behavior. A central question motivating his work is: "What is the largest and most tangible object that can be in two places at once?"

One of Lehnert's achievements is the development of techniques to cool the motion of a macroscopic mechanical oscillator — containing billions of atoms — to its quantum ground state, and to squeeze and manipulate its quantum state and observe single quanta of sound. In 2013, his group demonstrated entanglement of a macroscopic mechanical oscillator with electrical signals, showing that a microscopic aluminum drum (15 micrometers in diameter) could serve as a quantum memory and generate entanglement in microwave fields.

His group has also developed quantum-limited microwave amplifiers based on Josephson junctions, electro-optic transduction systems for connecting microwave and optical quantum information, and techniques for resolving individual phonon Fock states in mechanical oscillators.

=== Axion dark matter searches ===
Lehnert is a member of two experimental collaborations searching for the axion as a candidate for dark matter: HAYSTAC (Haloscope At Yale Sensitive To Axion Cold Dark Matter) and ALPHA (Axion Longitudinal Plasma Haloscope), both located at Wright Laboratory at Yale.

Lehnert's group developed the Josephson parametric amplifiers used in the HAYSTAC experiment. In 2021, the HAYSTAC collaboration demonstrated the first use of quantum squeezing to accelerate an axion dark matter search beyond the quantum noise limit, effectively doubling the search speed compared to quantum-limited operation.

=== Electro-optic transduction ===
Lehnert's group has developed methods for converting quantum information between microwave and optical frequencies using electro-optic transduction, a key technology for linking superconducting quantum computers into quantum networks. In 2022, his group demonstrated superconducting-qubit readout via low-backaction electro-optic transduction.

== Awards and honors ==
- Vannevar Bush Faculty Fellowship, United States Department of Defense (2020)
- Fellow, American Association for the Advancement of Science (2020)
- Kavli Fellow (2010, 2011)
- Department of Commerce Silver Medal
- Fellow, American Physical Society (2013)

== Selected publications ==
- Ma, X.; Viennot, J. J.; Kotler, S.; Teufel, J. D.; Lehnert, K. W. (2021). "Non-classical energy squeezing of a macroscopic mechanical oscillator". Nature Physics. 17: 322–326. arXiv:2005.04260. doi:10.1038/s41567-020-01102-1.
- Sletten, L. R.; Moores, B.; Viennot, J. J.; Lehnert, K. W. (2019). "Resolving Phonon Fock States in a Multimode Cavity with a Double-Slit Qubit". Physical Review X. 9 021056. arXiv:1902.06344. doi:10.1103/PhysRevX.9.021056.
- Palomaki, T. A.; Teufel, J. D.; Simmonds, R. W.; Lehnert, K. W. (2013). "Entangling mechanical motion with microwave fields". Science. 342 (6159): 710–713. doi:10.1126/science.1244563.
