= Williams, Adams County, Indiana =

- Unincorporated community
- Adams County's location in Indiana

- Location in Adams County
- Coordinates: 40°55′08″N 84°58′31″W
- Country: United States
- State: Indiana
- County: Adams
- Township: Root
- Elevation: 833 ft (254 m)
- Time zone: UTC-5 (Eastern (EST))
  - Summer (DST): UTC-4 (EDT)
- ZIP code: 46733
- Area code: 260
- FIPS code: 18-84320
- GNIS feature ID: 446056

Williams is an unincorporated community in Root Township, Adams County, in the U.S. state of Indiana.

== History ==
Williams was originally named Greenville in the 1870s (after the brothers who ran the sawmill), but this was changed as there was already a post office bearing the name of Greenville, Indiana. Garrett Williams therefore proposed the current name.
