= Larry Magid =

American journalist

Lawrence J. Magid
- Born: June 30, 1947 (age 79); Brooklyn, NY USA
- Education: University of California, Berkeley; University of Massachusetts Amherst
- Occupation: Journalist

Larry Magid (born 1947) is an American journalist, technology columnist and commentator. He is the author of several books.

== Early life ==
Lawrence J. Magid was born in 1947 in Brooklyn, NY. He grew up in Los Angeles, California. He completed a BA at UC Berkeley (1970) and a DEd at University of Massachusetts Amherst (1981).

== Career ==
Magid is CEO of ConnectSafely.org and, for 20 years, served as the on-air technology analyst for CBS News He is also a frequent contributor to BBC, NPR and other broadcast outlets.

In 1981 Magid was hired to secretly write the manual for the IBM PC version of EasyWriter, so he was among those aware of the computer's existence before its August 1981 debut. His technology columns and reviews appear regularly on CNET News.com, Forbes.com, Huffington Post and in the San Jose Mercury News.

Magid served the board of directors of the National Center for Missing and Exploited Children, and now serves on an advisory board. In 1994 he wrote the first popular publication on Internet safety called Child Safety on the Information Highway for the National Center for Missing and Exploited Children. That was followed in 1998 with Teen Safety on the Information Highway. Both publications have been revised and reprinted many times. He serves on the advisory boards of PBS Kids, the Family Online Safety Institute and the Congressional Internet Caucus, The Hub (children's TV network) and the Facebook Safety Advisory Board.

Magid is also the founder of SafeKids.com and SafeTeens.com, and co-founder and CEO of ConnectSafely.org. His technology website is LarrysWorld.com. All three websites provide information about Internet safety.

From 1983 to 2002 Magid wrote technology columns for the Los Angeles Times, and has written numerous columns for The New York Times. He is former editor of PC Magazine and has contributed to numerous other publications.

== Works ==
- Mini Manual for a Free University (1974)
- The Electronic Link: Using the IBM PC to Communicate (1984)
- Advanced WordPerfect: Feature and Techniques (1986)
- Larry Magid's Guide to the New Digital Highways (1993)
- The Little PC Books (1994, 1998, 2003, 2007)
- MySpace Unraveled (with Anne Collier, 2006)
