= Recreational Software Advisory Council =

The Recreational Software Advisory Council (RSAC) was an independent, non-profit organization founded in the U.S. in 1994 by the Software Publishers Association as well as six other industry leaders in response to video game controversy and threats of government regulation.

The goal of the council was to provide objective content ratings for computer games, similar to the earlier formed Videogame Rating Council (VRC) and later Entertainment Software Rating Board (ESRB). The RSAC ratings were based on the research of Dr. Donald F. Roberts of Stanford University who studied media and its effect on children.

In 1993, senators Herb Kohl and Joseph Lieberman raised concerns over the levels of violence and other adult material appearing in video games which were available to children. Under threat of government regulation, industry groups like the Software Publishers Association (SPA), the Association of Shareware Professionals (ASP), and others had concerns about the intrusion of the government, and the costs, delays and subjective judgments of a review-committee-based system.

At the time, the largest trade group, the SPA had few members in the gaming field, but the ASP had many, and the two organizations decided to work together. Mark Traphagen (an attorney with the SPA) and Rosemary West (ASP board member) appeared before Congress in the summer of 1994 in support of the SPA representation.

The SPA and ASP (and other industry groups) were opposed to an age-based rating system operated by a review committee as developed by the ESRB, which was proposed by several multi-national console game manufacturers and distributors. The groups preferred a content labeling system that would allow parents to know what was in the games and then make their own judgments about what their children would see.

An ASP-sponsored committee, led by Jim Green of Software Testing Labs, and staffed by Karen Crowther of Redwood Games, and Randy MacLean of FormGen, developed the initial version of what would become the RSAC ratings. The committee identified the elements most likely to be of concern to parents and developed specific descriptions of the levels of such content that would define the levels reported. The system would be self-administered by game publishers who could use the system to label their games.

The entire system was turned over to the SPA for its newly formed Recreational Software Advisory Council in 1994. The council formed RSACi in 1995, which was a branch which rated websites.

The organization was closed in 1999 and reformed into the Internet Content Rating Association (ICRA).

== Software labels ==
		Level 1	Level 2	Level 3	Level 4
VIOLENCE	Harmless conflict; some damage to objects	Creatures injured or killed; damage to objects; fighting	Humans injured or killed; with small amount of blood	Humans injured or killed; blood and gore	Wanton and gratuitous violence; torture; rape
NUDITY/SEX	No nudity or revealing attire / Romance, no sex	Revealing attire / Passionate kissing	Partial nudity / Clothed sexual touching	Non-sexual frontal nudity / Non-explicit sexual activity	Provocative frontal nudity / Explicit sexual activity; sex crimes
LANGUAGE	Inoffensive slang; no profanity	Mild expletives	Expletives; non-sexual anatomical references	Strong, vulgar language; obscene gestures	Crude or explicit sexual references

== Internet ratings ==
These RSACi ratings are included and used in the "Content Advisor" feature of Microsoft Internet Explorer.

	Violence Rating Descriptor	Nudity Rating Descriptor	Sex Rating Descriptor	Language Rating Descriptor
Level 0:	Harmless conflict, some damage to objects	No nudity or revealing attire	Romance, no sex	Inoffensive slang; no profanity
Level 1:	Creatures injured or killed; damage to objects; fighting	Revealing attire	Passionate kissing	Mild expletives
Level 2:	Humans injured or with small amount of blood	Partial nudity	Clothed sexual touching	Expletives; non-sexual anatomical references
Level 3:	Humans injured or killed	Non-sexual frontal nudity	Non-explicit sexual activity	Strong, vulgar language; obscene gestures; Racial Epithets
Level 4:	Wanton and gratuitous violence; torture; rape	Provocative frontal nudity	Explicit sexual activity; sex crimes	Crude or explicit sexual references; Extreme Hate Speech

== See also ==
- Mobile software content rating system
