= Andreas Lehnert =

German clarinetist

Andreas Lehnert is a German clarinetist.

Lehnert was born in Augsburg, Germany, and studied at the Colleges of Music in Stuttgart and Detmold. From 1994 to 1995, he was principal clarinet with the Hessian Staatstheater Darmstadt; since 1995, he has been the principal clarinetist for the Leipzig Gewandhausorchester. He has also appeared as a soloist with the Stuttgart Philharmonic and the Baden-Baden Philharmonic. He is also a member of Sinfonietta Leipzig.
