= Progress and Freedom Foundation =

Former American political think tank

The Progress & Freedom Foundation
- Established: 1993
- Website: www.pff.org
- Dissolved: 2010

The Progress & Freedom Foundation (PFF) was an American market-oriented think tank based in Washington, D.C. that studied the digital revolution and its implications for public policy. Its mission was to educate policymakers, opinion leaders and the public about issues associated with technological change, based on a philosophy of limited government, free markets and individual sovereignty.

PFF was funded in part by the digital media and communication industry.

On September 30, 2010, PFF President Adam Thierer blogged that the organization would cease all operations immediately.

== Policy areas ==
The Progress and Freedom Foundation focused its work on four major policy areas:

- Communications
- Intellectual Property
- Media Policy
- Internet Policy & E-Commerce

PFF's past policy stances include:

- Advocating an evidence-based communications policy framework that relies to the maximum extent possible on competitive forces to achieve next generation IP-based infrastructure deployment and service innovation
- Encouraging innovation by protection of rich digital content through the traditional legal notions of copyright and patent while urging private solutions to reduce digital piracy without government mandates.
- Explaining the need for lower taxes on telecommunications services, a tax moratorium for Internet commerce and privatization of government-run cable TV and telephone companies.
- Maximizing media freedom both in a structural (business) sense and a social (speech-related) sense, thus removing the shackles that limit the market flexibility of media operators, while ensuring freedom of speech and expression throughout society.
- Advancing a market-oriented approach to Internet policy issues that minimize government control and regulation while maximizing the vital role of free markets, free speech and property rights, allowing the online sector to innovate, invest and grow.

In particular, PFF has been known for strong support for software patents and digital rights management systems, and steady skepticism of IP Commons and Free Culture.

== Center for Digital Media Freedom ==
The Center for Digital Media Freedom was a part of the Progress & Freedom Foundation. The center's goal was to "protect America's sacred First Amendment heritage and promote enlightened public policy regarding all forms of communications," by maximizing both the social (freedom of speech) and business (freedom from regulation) freedoms of the digital economy.

== People ==
- Kent Lassman – staff member, now president and CEO of the Competitive Enterprise Institute
