= Lennart Harms =

German politician (born 1991)

Member of the Landtag of Mecklenburg-Vorpommern
- Assuming office 20 October 2026
- Succeeding: Rainer Albrecht
- Constituency: Rostock II

Personal details
- Born: 1991 (age 34–35)
- Party: Social Democratic Party (since 2016)

Lennart Harms (born 1991) is a German politician who was elected member of the Landtag of Mecklenburg-Vorpommern in 2026. He is the chairman of the Social Democratic Party in Western Rostock.
