= Lennart Axelsson (musician) =

Swedish trumpet player (born 1941)

Lennart Axelsson (born 11 July 1941) is a Swedish trumpet player who has spent a good part of his career in Germany.

== Biography ==
Born and raised in Sweden, he began his career in a Swedish armed forces band. Disillusioned with military life, he quit to become a full-time musician, playing with various jazz bands in Sweden. In the early 1970s, he moved to Zürich, Switzerland to take a job in the big band of Swiss radio station Schweizer Radio DRS. In 1974, he joined the James Last Orchestra. He was one of the featured trumpet soloists on Last's 1975 album In The Mood For Trumpets, along with Rick Kiefer and Ack van Rooyen; this was notable as Last's record company Polydor usually did not credit the individual personnel on Last's studio recordings. In 1979, Axelsson left the Last band and joined the NDR (Norddeutscher Rundfunk, or North German Radio) big band, where he eventually became the featured trumpet soloist. He retired from the NDR band in 2005.
