= Fort Wayne metropolitan area =

Place in Indiana, United States

Fort Wayne CSA Northeast Indiana
- Combined Statistical Area
- Fort Wayne–Huntington–Auburn, IN CSA
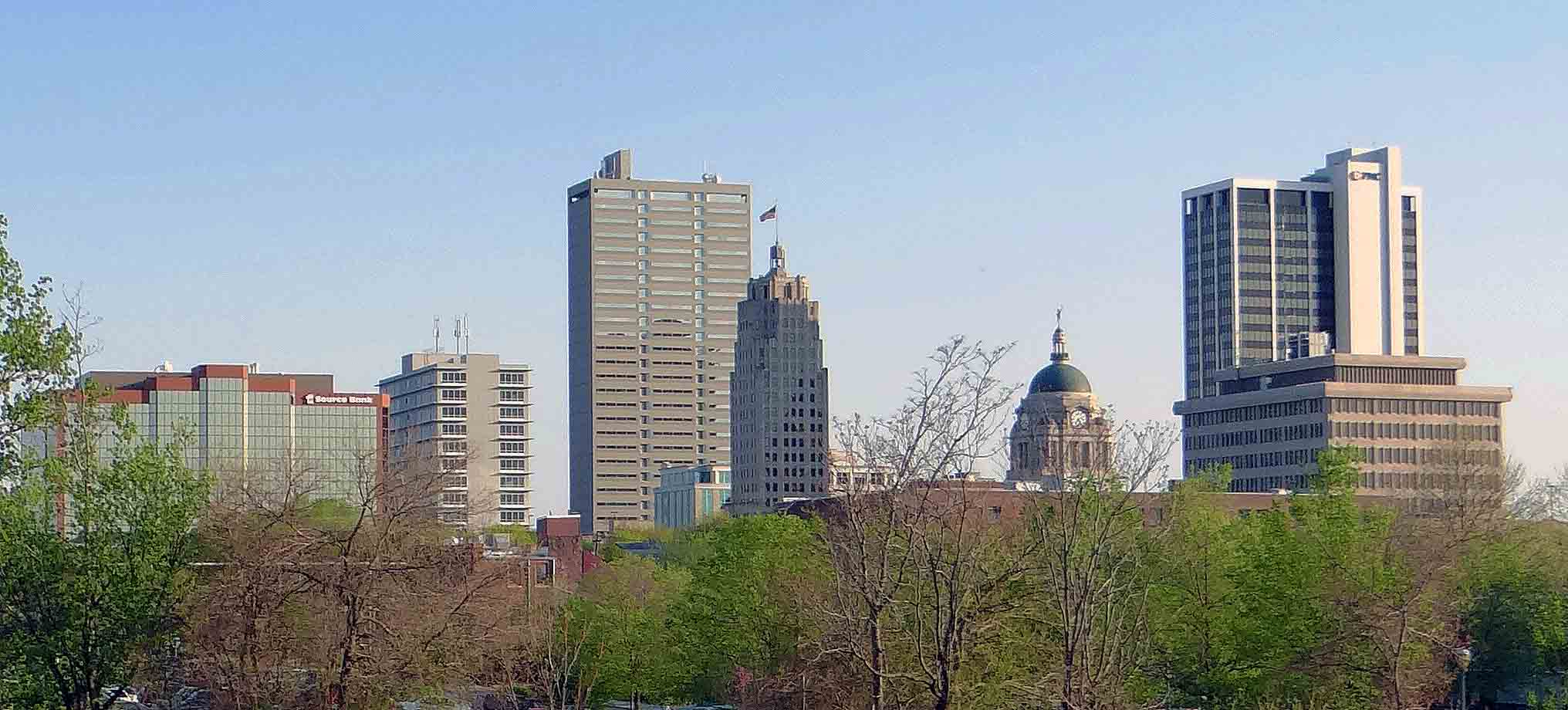
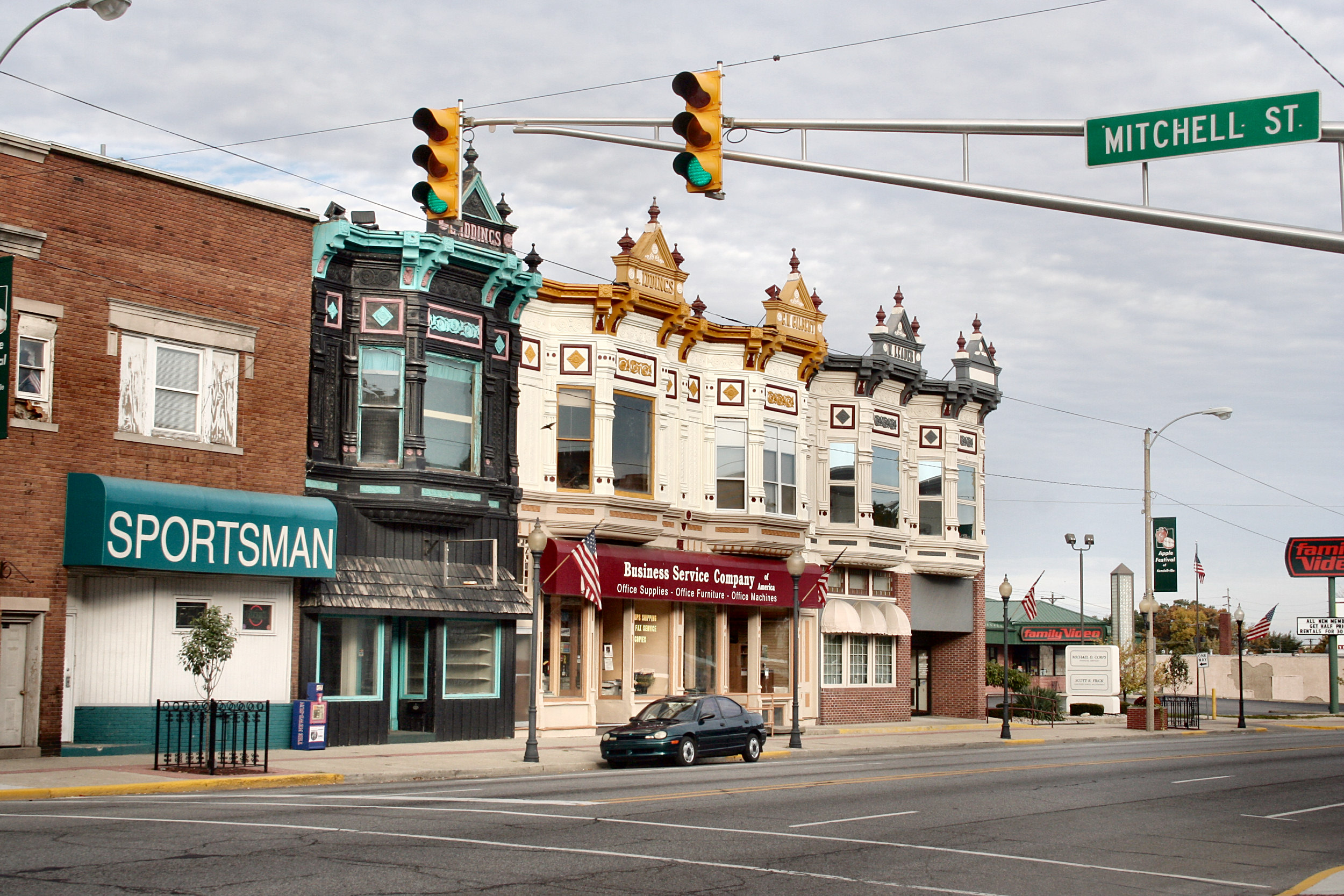
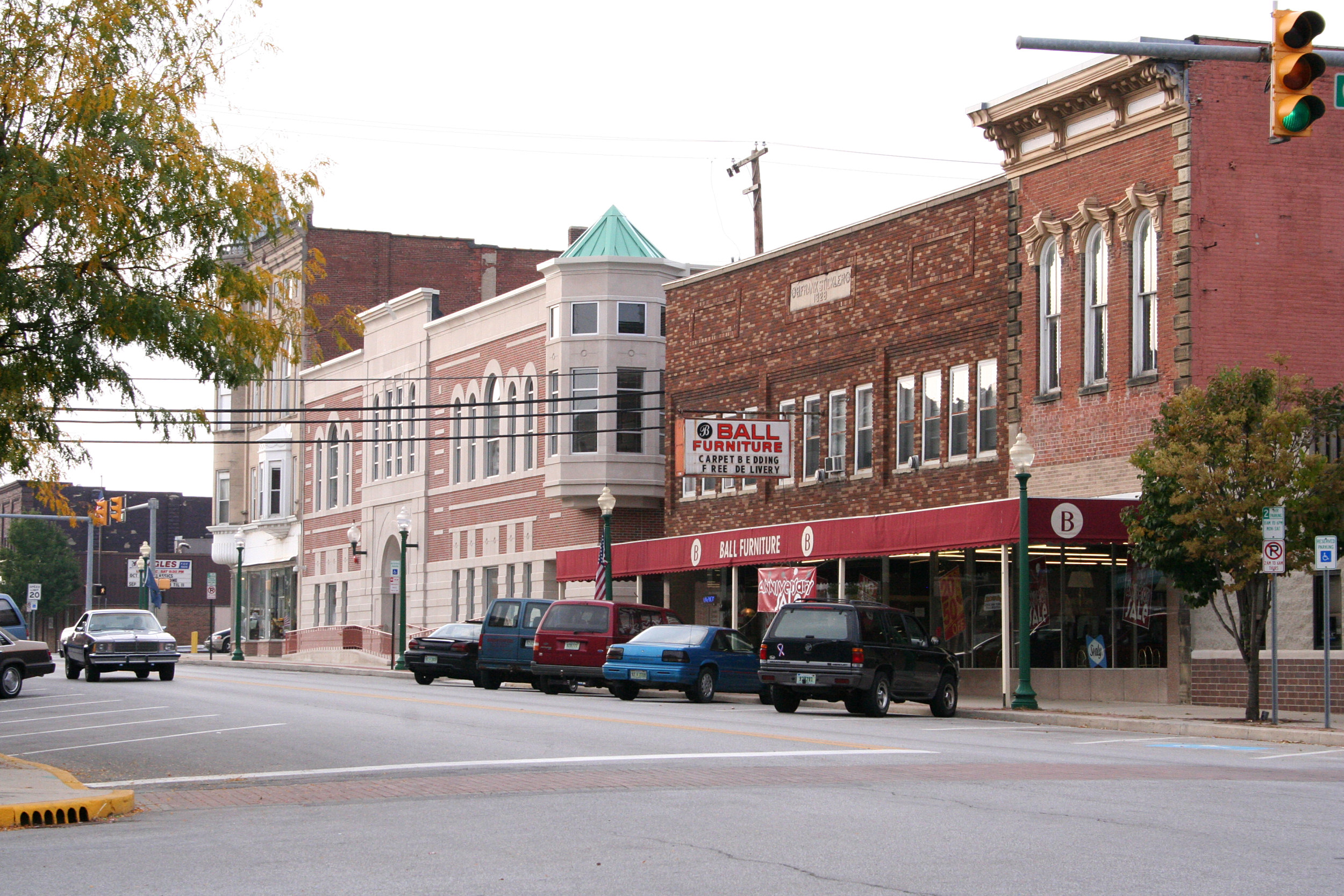
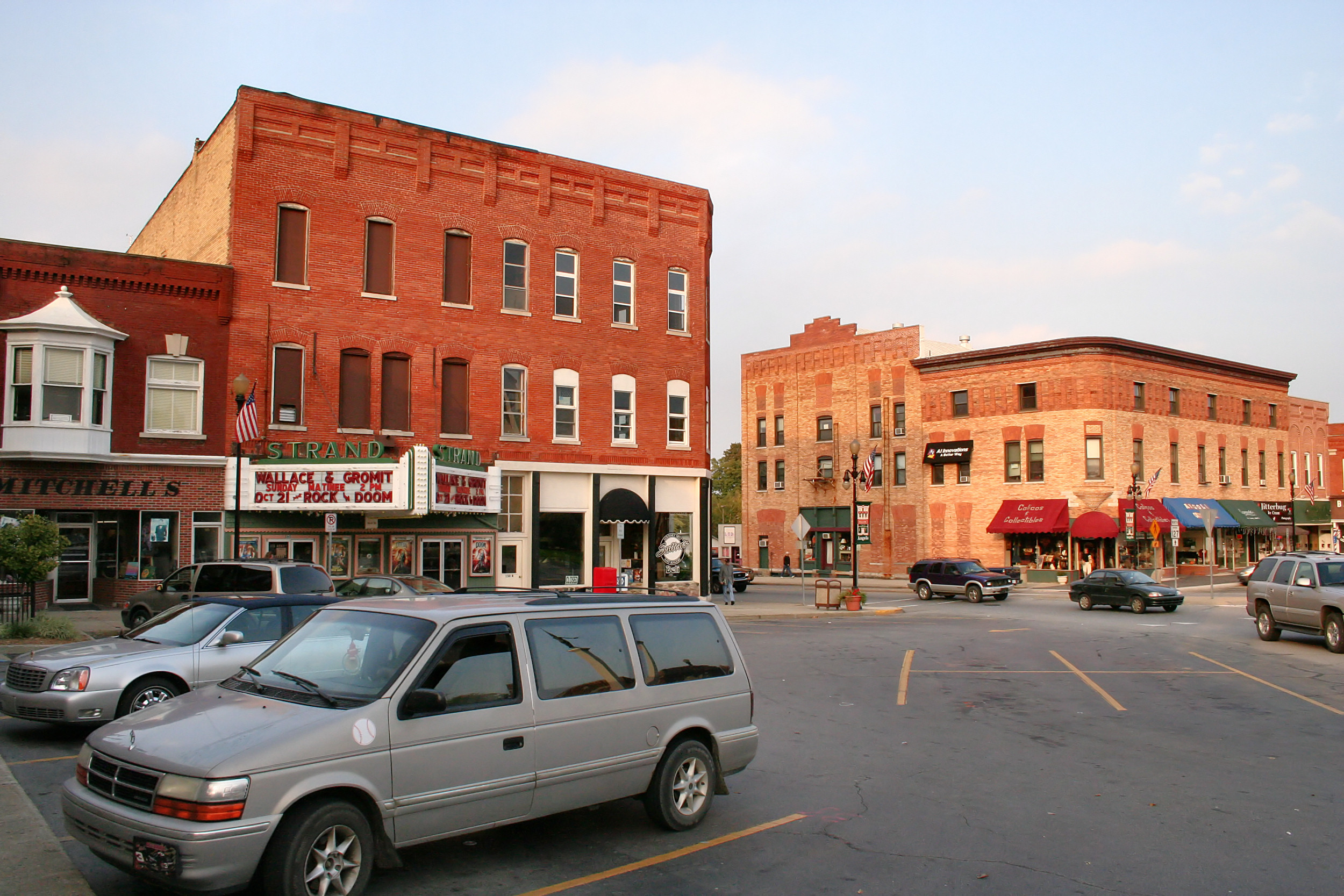
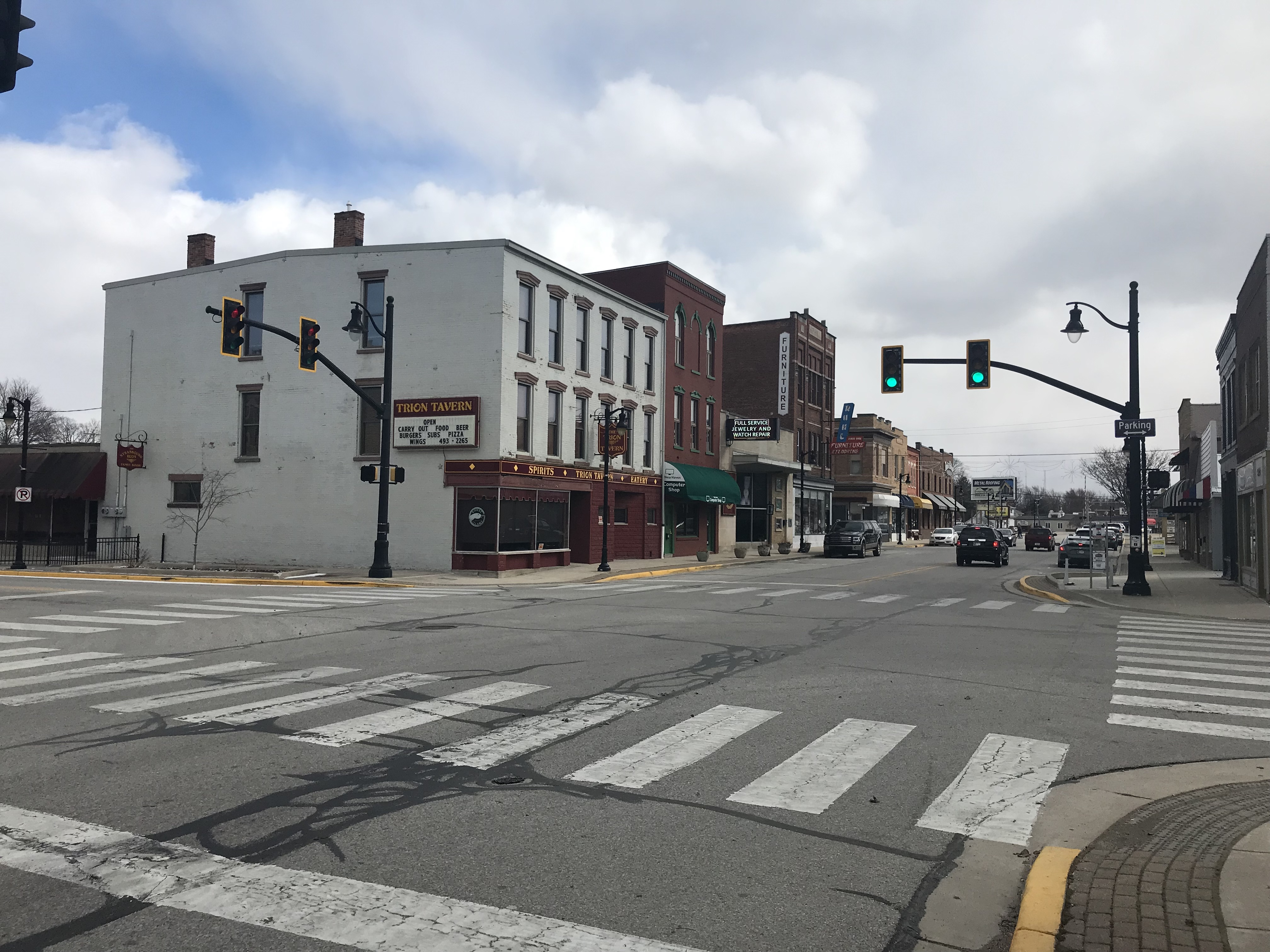
Map of Fort Wayne–Huntington–Auburn, IN CSA
City of Fort Wayne
Fort Wayne MSA
Kendallville µSA
Auburn µSA
Huntington µSA
Decatur µSA
Angola µSA
- Coordinates: 41°N 85°W
- Country: United States
- State: Indiana
- Largest city: Fort Wayne
- Other cities: Huntington; New Haven; Auburn; Bluffton; Kendallville

Area
  - Total: 3,199.62 sq mi (8,287.0 km^{2})

Population (2020)
  - Total: 645,409
  - Rank: 79th in the U.S.
  - Density: 201.7/sq mi (77.88/km^{2})

GDP
  - Total: $28.565 billion (2022)
- Time zone: UTC−05:00 (EST)
  - Summer (DST): UTC−04:00 (EDT)
- ZIP Codes: ZIP codes: 46565, 46571, 46701-46706, 46710-46711, 46714, 46721, 46723, 46725, 46730-46733, 46737-46738, 46740-46743, 46745-46748, 46750, 46755, 46759-46761, 46763-46767, 46770-46774, 46776-46789, 46791-46799, 46801–46809, 46814–46816, 46818-46819, 46825, 46835, 46845
- Area codes: 260, 574, 765

As of March 2020, the Fort Wayne–Huntington–Auburn Combined Statistical Area (CSA), or Fort Wayne Metropolitan Area, or Northeast Indiana is a federally designated combined statistical area consisting of eight counties in northeast Indiana (Adams, Allen, DeKalb, Huntington, Noble, Steuben, Wells, and Whitley counties), anchored by the city of Fort Wayne.

The CSA is further divided into one metropolitan statistical area (Fort Wayne) and five micropolitan statistical areas (Angola, Auburn, Decatur, Huntington, and Kendallville). As of the 2020 census, the CSA had a population of 645,409. The Fort Wayne metropolitan area is part of the Northern Indiana region, containing about 2.3 million people, and is considered part of the Great Lakes Megalopolis, which contains an estimated 59 million people.

== Definitions ==
=== Metropolitan Statistical Area ===
The Fort Wayne, IN Metropolitan Statistical Area, as defined by the Office of Management and Budget, is an area consisting of three counties in Northern Indiana anchored by the city of Fort Wayne. The MSA had a population of 447,781 at the 2020 census, increasing to an estimated 466,258 in 2025. The Fort Wayne MSA is the 117th largest MSA in the United States.

County	Seat	2025 estimate	2020 census	Change	Area	Density
Allen	Fort Wayne	402,329	385,410	+4.39%	660.02 sq mi (1,709.4 km^{2})	610/sq mi (235/km^{2})
Wells	Bluffton	28,883	28,180	+2.49%	370.25 sq mi (958.9 km^{2})	78/sq mi (30/km^{2})
Whitley	Columbia City	35,046	34,191	+2.50%	337.91 sq mi (875.2 km^{2})	104/sq mi (40/km^{2})
Total		466,258	447,781	+4.13%	1,368.18 sq mi (3,543.6 km^{2})	341/sq mi (132/km^{2})

=== Combined Statistical Area ===
Based on commuting patterns, the Office of Management and Budget combines the Fort Wayne metropolitan area with the adjacent micropolitan areas of Angola (Stueben County), Auburn (DeKalb County), Decatur (Adams County), Huntington (Huntington County), and Kendallville (Noble County) to form the broader Fort Wayne–Huntington–Auburn, IN Combined Statistical Area. The population of this wider region was estimated at 667,403 in 2025. The Fort Wayne CSA is the 80th largest CSA in the United States.

Statistical Area	2025 estimate	2020 Census	Change	Area	Density
Fort Wayne, IN Metropolitan Statistical Area	466,258	447,781	+4.13%	1,368.18 sq mi (3,543.6 km^{2})	341/sq mi (132/km^{2})
Kendallville, IN Micropolitan Statistical Area	47,937	47,457	+1.01%	417.43 sq mi (1,081.1 km^{2})	115/sq mi (44/km^{2})
Auburn, IN Micropolitan Statistical Area	44,535	43,265	+2.94%	363.85 sq mi (942.4 km^{2})	122/sq mi (47/km^{2})
Huntington, IN Micropolitan Statistical Area	37,224	36,662	+1.53%	387.72 sq mi (1,004.2 km^{2})	96/sq mi (37/km^{2})
Decatur, IN Micropolitan Statistical Area	36,650	35,809	+2.35%	339.97 sq mi (880.5 km^{2})	108/sq mi (42/km^{2})
Angola, IN Micropolitan Statistical Area	34,799	34,435	+1.06%	322.47 sq mi (835.2 km^{2})	108/sq mi (42/km^{2})
Total	667,403	645,409	+3.41%	3,199.62 sq mi (8,287.0 km^{2})	209/sq mi (81/km^{2})

== Communities ==
=== Places with more than 100,000 inhabitants ===
- Fort Wayne (Principal city)

=== Places with 10,000 to 100,000 inhabitants ===
- Auburn
- Bluffton
- Huntington
- Kendallville
- New Haven

=== Places with 1,000 to 10,000 inhabitants ===
- Albion
- Andrews
- Angola
- Avilla
- Berne
- Butler
- Churubusco
- Clear Lake
- Columbia City
- Corunna
- Decatur
- Fremont
- Garrett
- Geneva
- Grabill
- Hamilton
- Huntertown
- Leo-Cedarville
- Ligonier
- Markle
- Monroeville
- Mount Etna
- Ossian
- Roanoke
- Rome City
- Saint Joe
- South Whitley
- Warren
- Waterloo
- Woodburn

=== Places with fewer than 1,000 inhabitants ===
- Altona
- Ashley
- Cromwell
- Hudson
- Larwill
- Monroe
- Orland
- Poneto
- Uniondale
- Vera Cruz
- Wolcottville
- Zanesville

=== Census-designated places (CDPs) ===
- Harlan
- Hoagland
- Kimmell
- Tri-Lakes

== Townships ==
=== Adams County ===
- Blue Creek
- French
- Hartford
- Jefferson
- Kirkland
- Monroe
- Preble
- Root
- Saint Marys
- Union
- Wabash
- Washington

=== Allen County ===
- Aboite Township
- Adams Township
- Cedar Creek Township
- Eel River Township
- Jackson Township
- Jefferson Township
- Lafayette Township
- Lake Township
- Madison Township
- Marion Township
- Maumee Township
- Milan Township
- Monroe Township
- Perry Township
- Pleasant Township
- St. Joseph Township
- Scipio Township
- Springfield Township
- Washington Township
- Wayne Township

=== Wells County ===
- Chester Township
- Harrison Township
- Jackson Township
- Jefferson Township
- Lancaster Township
- Liberty Township
- Nottingham Township
- Rockcreek Township
- Union Township

=== Whitley County ===
- Cleveland Township
- Columbia Township
- Etna-Troy Township
- Jefferson Township
- Richland Township
- Smith Township
- Thorncreek Township
- Union Township
- Washington Township

== Notable residents ==
- Chris Schenkel, former Sportscaster for ABC Sports. Born in Bippus.

== See also ==
- Northern Indiana
