= List of Indiana state historical markers in Adams County =

Location of Adams County in Indiana

This is a list of the Indiana state historical markers in Adams County.

This is intended to be a complete list of the official state historical markers placed in Adams County, Indiana, United States by the Indiana Historical Bureau. The locations of the historical markers and their latitude and longitude coordinates are included below when available, along with their names, years of placement, and topics as recorded by the Historical Bureau. There are 2 historical markers located in Adams County.

== Historical markers ==
Marker title	Image	Year placed	Location	Topics
The Wayne Trace		1977	6640 N. State Road 101, 0.1 miles north of the U.S. Route 224 junction and 3 miles east of Decatur, on the western side of the road 40°50′32″N 84°51′43″W	Military, American Indian/Native American
Geneva Downtown Historic District		2006	Line and High Streets in Geneva; 40°35′32″N 84°57′29″W	Business, Industry, and Labor, Historic District, Neighborhoods, and Towns, Buildings and Architecture

== See also ==
- List of Indiana state historical markers
- National Register of Historic Places listings in Adams County, Indiana
