= Washington Township, Adams County, Indiana =

Washington Township
- Township
- Location in Adams County
- Coordinates: 40°47′26″N 84°56′07″W
- Country: United States
- State: Indiana
- County: Adams

Government
  - Type: Indiana township

Area
  - Total: 37.52 sq mi (97.2 km^{2})
  - Land: 37.49 sq mi (97.1 km^{2})
  - Water: 0.04 sq mi (0.10 km^{2}) 0.11%
- Elevation: 810 ft (247 m)

Population (2020)
  - Total: 8,654
  - Density: 270.8/sq mi (104.6/km^{2})
- Time zone: UTC-5 (Eastern (EST))
  - Summer (DST): UTC-4 (EDT)
- ZIP codes: 46733, 46772
- Area code: 260
- GNIS feature ID: 453980

Washington Township is one of the twelve townships in Adams County, Indiana. As of the 2020 census, its population was 8,654, down from 10,151 at the 2010 census.

== Geography ==
According to the 2010 census, the township has a total area of 37.52 square miles (97.2 km^{2}), of which 37.49 square miles (97.1 km^{2}) (or 99.92%) is land and 0.04 square miles (0.10 km^{2}) (or 0.11%) is water.

=== Cities, towns, villages ===
- Decatur (south three-quarters)
- Monroe (north half)

=== Unincorporated towns ===
- Coppess Corner

=== Adjacent townships ===
- Root Township (north)
- Union Township (northeast)
- St. Marys Township (east)
- Blue Creek Township (southeast)
- Monroe Township (south)
- French Township (southwest)
- Kirkland Township (west)
- Preble Township (northwest)

=== Cemeteries ===
The township contains the following cemeteries: Antioch (also known as Beery or River Brethren), County Home (or Farm or Infirmary- no longer exists), Greenwood (also known as Decatur or Maplewood), First City (no longer exists), Little Family, and Roe (no longer exists).

=== Major highways ===
- US 27
- US 33
- US 224
- SR 124

=== Airports and landing strips ===
- Gage Airport

=== Landmarks ===
- Stratton Park

== School districts ==
- Adams Central Community Schools
- North Adams Community Schools

== Political districts ==
- Indiana's 6th congressional district
- State House District 79
- State Senate District 19
