= Tornado outbreak of March 23, 1917 =

Weather event in the United States

Coordinates: 40.5564°N 94.9716°W

Meteorological history
- Formed: March 23, 1917

Tornado outbreak
- Tornadoes: ≥9
- Max. rating: F4 tornado

Overall effects
- Fatalities: ≥ 47
- Injuries: ≥ 300+
- Areas affected: Ohio Valley

The March 1917 tornado outbreak was a tornado outbreak that occurred on March 23, 1917. It affected the Ohio Valley and produced several strong tornadoes, the worst of which devastated the city of New Albany, Indiana.

== Confirmed tornadoes ==
Confirmed tornadoes by Fujita rating
FU	F0	F1	F2	F3	F4	F5	Total
?	0	?	5	3	1	0	≥ 9

List of confirmed tornadoes in the tornado outbreak of March 23, 1917
F#	Location	County / Parish	State	Time (UTC) (Note: All dates are based on the local time zone where the tornado touched down; however, all times are in Coordinated Universal Time and dates are split at midnight CST/CDT for consistency.)	Path length	Width (Note: The listed width values are primarily the average/mean width of the tornadoes, with those having known maximum widths denoted by ♯. From 1952 to 1994, reports largely list mean width whereas contemporary years list maximum width. Values provided by Grazulis are the average width, with estimates being rounded down (i.e. 0.5 mi (0.80 km) is rounded down from 880 yards to 800 yards.)
F2	NW to N of Vienna	Johnson	Illinois	18:30–?	4 mi (6.4 km)	100 yd (91 m)
F2	Five farms were hit, and one house was wrecked. An injury was reported.					
F2	W to N of Pittsboro	Henricks	Indiana	18:45–?	8 mi (13 km)	150 yd (140 m)
F2	40 farms were damaged or destroyed, and one person was injured. The tornado killed 50 head of livestock and unroofed or severely damaged approximately 20 homes. The highly visible funnel gave people time to seek shelter.					
F3	NE of Flat Rock (IL) to Pleasantville (IN)	Crawford (IL), Sullivan (IN)	Illinois, Indiana	19:15–?	22 mi (35 km)	400 yd (370 m)
F3	1 death — At least 40 farms were impacted, about half of which were shorn of a barn, the roof of the farmhouse, or both. A man was killed near Flat Rock, Illinois, and 20 other people were injured.					
F2	NNE of Swayzee	Grant	Indiana	20:30–?	2 mi (3.2 km)	200 yd (180 m)
F2	One house was unroofed, and a barn wrecked. A pair of men were injured while trying to escape from the tornado.					
F2	SSW of Preble to E of Monmouth	Adams	Indiana	20:55–?	10 mi (16 km)	70 yd (64 m)
F2	12 houses and one school were destroyed or unroofed. Six of the seven people injured were students huddled in a school basement.					
F4	W of New Albany (IN) to near Prospect (KY)	Floyd (IN), Clark (IN), Jefferson (KY)	Indiana, Kentucky	21:08–?	15 mi (24 km)	400 yd (370 m)
F4	46 deaths — Major damage occurred in the town of New Albany. Two schools, a factory, and 300 houses were destroyed. Many of the houses were wiped clean off their foundations. More than 250 people were injured.					
F3	SE of DeSoto	Delaware	Indiana	21:30–?	3 mi (4.8 km)	200 yd (180 m)
F3	A mother and child were injured when their farmhouse was damaged.					
F3	WNW of Corydon to NE of Lanesville	Harrison	Indiana	21:30–?	7 mi (11 km)	600 yd (550 m)
F3	A farmhouse was destroyed, and a mother and her baby were blown 200 yd (600 ft) away from it. A total of 20 people were injured.					
F2	SE of Hartsville	Trousdale	Tennessee	23:00–?	5 mi (8.0 km)	200 yd (180 m)
F2	Two homes were destroyed, and eight people sustained injuries.					

== See also ==
- List of North American tornadoes and tornado outbreaks
