= Adams Central Middle/High School =

Adams Central High School

Location
- 222 West Washington Street; Monroe, Indiana 46772; United States; 40°44′45″N 84°56′34″W

Information
- Type: Public high school
- Principal: Katie Isch
- Teaching staff: 30.50 (on an FTE basis)
- Grades: 9-12
- Enrollment: 412 (2024–2025)
- Student to teacher ratio: 13.51
- Campus: Rural
- Color
- Nickname: Flying Jets
- Rival: South Adams Starfires
- Website: www.accs.k12.in.us/page/mshs

Adams Central Middle/High School in Monroe, Adams County, Indiana, United States, is a public high school of the Adams Central Community Schools. It has been named a "Four Star School" by the Indiana Department of Education three times since 2009.

== Athletics ==
Adams Central is part of the Allen County Athletic Conference. They compete under the name "Flying Jets" and the school colors are red and white. The following sports are offered at Central (unless marked, there are separate boys' and girls' teams):

- Baseball (boys')
- Basketball
- Cross country
- Football (boys')
  - State champions - 2000, 2024
- Golf
- Softball (girls')
- Swimming
- Tennis
- Track
- Volleyball (girls')
- Wrestling (boys')

== See also ==
- List of high schools in Indiana
- Allen County Athletic Conference
- Monroe, Adams County, Indiana
