= National Register of Historic Places listings in Adams County, Indiana =

Location of Adams County in Indiana

This is a list of the National Register of Historic Places listings in Adams County, Indiana.

This is intended to be a complete list of the properties and districts on the National Register of Historic Places in Adams County, Indiana, United States. Latitude and longitude coordinates are provided for many National Register properties and districts; these locations may be seen together in a map.

There are 10 properties and districts listed on the National Register in the county.

Properties and districts located in incorporated areas display the name of the municipality, while properties and districts in unincorporated areas display the name of their civil township. Properties and districts split between multiple jurisdictions display the names of all jurisdictions.

This National Park Service list is complete through NPS recent listings posted August 22, 2025.

== Current listings ==
	Name on the Register	Image	Date listed	Location	City or town	Description
1	Adams County Courthouse	Adams County Courthouse	September 17, 2008 (#08000914)	112 S. 2nd St. 40°49′47″N 84°55′28″W	Decatur	
2	John S. Bowers House	John S. Bowers House	March 5, 1982 (#82000055)	104 Marshall St. 40°50′04″N 84°55′26″W	Decatur	
3	Ceylon Covered Bridge	Ceylon Covered Bridge	January 25, 2007 (#06001289)	County Road 900S over the Wabash River in Limberlost County Park, northeast of Ceylon; 40°36′51″N 84°56′35″W	Wabash Township	
4	Ben Colter Polygonal Barn	Ben Colter Polygonal Barn	April 2, 1993 (#93000194)	Eastern side of State Road 101, 0.6 miles south of its junction with Piqua Rd. and north of Pleasant Mills; 40°47′53″N 84°50′27″W	St. Marys Township	
5	Decatur Homesteads		December 6, 2022 (#100008407)	Each side of Homestead Dr. and the west side of High St. 40°48′49″N 84°55′12″W	Decatur	
6	Charles Dugan House	Charles Dugan House	December 22, 2009 (#09001124)	420 W. Monroe St. 40°49′52″N 84°55′40″W	Decatur	
7	Geneva Downtown Commercial Historic District	Geneva Downtown Commercial Historic District	March 21, 2002 (#02000196)	144-455 E. Line St. 40°35′33″N 84°57′33″W	Geneva	
8	Grand Rapids and Indiana Railroad Depot	Grand Rapids and Indiana Railroad Depot	March 6, 2017 (#100000712)	111 N. 7th St. 40°49′44″N 84°55′48″W	Decatur	
9	Lenhart Farmhouse	Lenhart Farmhouse	June 27, 2002 (#02000688)	6929 N. Piqua Rd., north of Decatur; 40°50′47″N 84°55′12″W	Root Township	
10	Gene Stratton Porter Cabin	Gene Stratton Porter Cabin	June 27, 1974 (#74000027)	200 E. 6th St. 40°35′13″N 84°57′36″W	Geneva	

== See also ==
- List of National Historic Landmarks in Indiana
- National Register of Historic Places listings in Indiana
- Listings in neighboring counties: Allen, Jay, Mercer (OH), Van Wert (OH), Wells
- List of Indiana state historical markers in Adams County
