= WDBF =

WDBF may refer to:

- WDBF-FM, a radio station (106.3 FM) licensed to serve Mount Union, Pennsylvania, United States
- WDBF-LP, a low-power radio station (103.5 FM) licensed to serve Decatur, Indiana, United States
- World Dodgeball Federation, the world governing body for the sport of dodgeball.
