= Curryville =

Curyville may refer to:

- Curryville, Georgia, an unincorporated community
- Curryville, Indiana, an unincorporated community in Adams and Wells counties
- Curryville, Sullivan County, Indiana, an unincorporated community
- Curryville, Missouri, a small city
- Curryville, New Brunswick
