= Honduras (disambiguation) =

Honduras is a country in Central America. It may also refer to:

== Places ==
- Honduras, Indiana, United States
- Honduras, Barranquitas, Puerto Rico
- Honduras, Cidra, Puerto Rico
- British Honduras, the previous name of Belize
- Honduras de la Sierra, Chiapas, Mexico
- Honduras farm, site of the Honduras and La Negra farms massacre in Antioquia Department, Colombia

== People ==
- Honduras (actor), Taiwanese actor, television host and comedian
