= Magley, Indiana =

- Unincorporated community
- Adams County's location in Indiana

- Location in Adams County
- Coordinates: 40°49′53″N 85°03′12″W
- Country: United States
- State: Indiana
- County: Adams
- Township: Preble
- Named after: Jacob J. Magley
- Elevation: 833 ft (254 m)
- Time zone: UTC-5 (Eastern (EST))
  - Summer (DST): UTC-4 (EDT)
- ZIP code: 46733
- Area code: 260
- FIPS code: 18-46152
- GNIS feature ID: 438474

Magley is an unincorporated community in Preble Township, Adams County, in the U.S. state of Indiana. It is approximately 6 miles west of Decatur, Indiana.

== History ==
A post office was established at Magley in 1883, and remained in operation until it was discontinued in 1927. The community was named for the first postmaster, Jacob J. Magley.
