= Linn Grove =

Linn Grove may refer to a place in the United States:

- Linn Grove, Indiana
- Linn Grove, Iowa
