= Geneva Downtown Commercial Historic District =

Geneva Downtown Commercial Historic District may refer to:

- Geneva Downtown Commercial Historic District (Geneva, Indiana)
- Geneva Downtown Commercial Historic District (Geneva, New York)

== See also ==
- Central Geneva Historic District, Geneva, Illinois
