= Blue Creek Township =

Blue Creek Township may refer to the following townships in the United States:

- Blue Creek Township, Adams County, Indiana
- Blue Creek Township, Ohio
