= Monroe Township, Adams County, Indiana =

Monroe Township
- Township
- Location in Adams County
- Coordinates: 40°42′10″N 84°56′03″W
- Country: United States
- State: Indiana
- County: Adams

Government
  - Type: Indiana township

Area
  - Total: 36.39 sq mi (94.2 km^{2})
  - Land: 36.34 sq mi (94.1 km^{2})
  - Water: 0.05 sq mi (0.13 km^{2}) 0.14%
- Elevation: 833 ft (254 m)

Population (2020)
  - Total: 5,287
  - Density: 133.7/sq mi (51.6/km^{2})
- Time zone: UTC-5 (Eastern (EST))
  - Summer (DST): UTC-4 (EDT)
- ZIP codes: 46711, 46733, 46772
- Area code: 260
- GNIS feature ID: 453633

Historical population
Census	Pop.	Note	%±
1940	3,119		—
1950	3,110		−0.3%
1960	3,297		6.0%
1970	3,595		9.0%
1980	3,902		8.5%
1990	4,174		7.0%
2000	4,551		9.0%
2010	4,858		6.7%
2020	5,287		8.8%
U.S. Census:

Monroe Township is one of twelve townships in Adams County, Indiana. As of the 2020 census, its population was 5,287, up from 4,858 at the 2010 census.

== Geography ==
According to the 2010 census, the township has a total area of 36.39 square miles (94.2 km^{2}), of which 36.34 square miles (94.1 km^{2}) (or 99.86%) is land and 0.05 square miles (0.13 km^{2}) (or 0.14%) is water.

=== Cities, towns, villages ===
- Berne (south half)
- Monroe (north half)

=== Adjacent townships ===
- Washington Township (north)
- St. Marys Township (northeast)
- Blue Creek Township (east)
- Wabash Township (south)
- Hartford Township (southwest)
- French Township (west)
- Kirkland Township (northwest)

=== Cemeteries ===
The township contains these four cemeteries: Graber, Mazelin, Ray, Smith, and Winchester.

=== Major highways ===
- US 27
- SR 124
- SR 218

=== Airports and landing strips ===
- Sprungers South Adams County Airstrip

== School districts ==
- Adams Central Community Schools
- South Adams Schools

== Political districts ==
- Indiana's 6th congressional district
- State House District 79
- State Senate District 19
