= Kirkland Township, Adams County, Indiana =

Kirkland Township
- Township
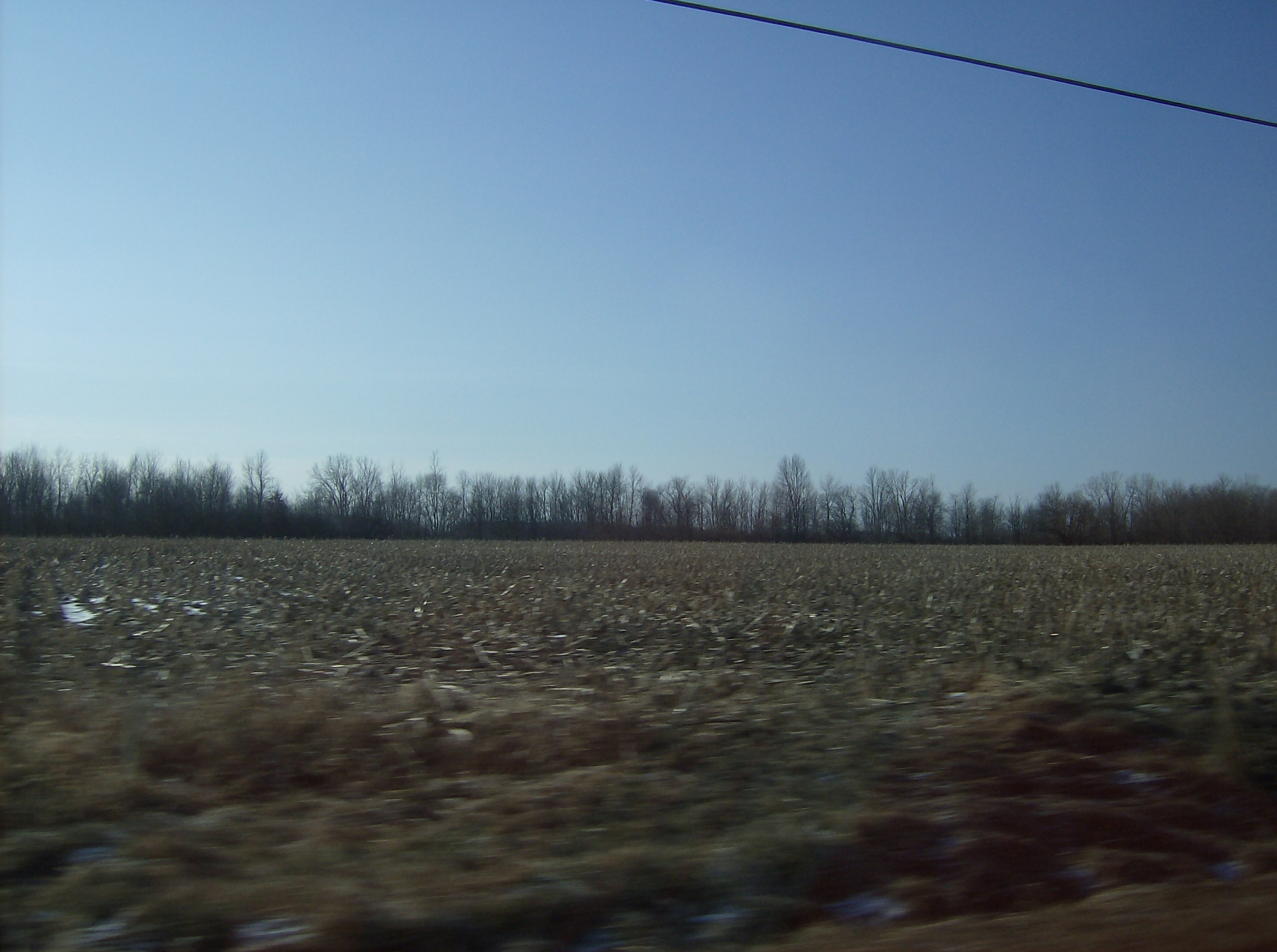
- A farm field in Kirkland Township

- Location in Adams County
- Coordinates: 40°47′09″N 85°01′46″W
- Country: United States
- State: Indiana
- County: Adams

Government
  - Type: Indiana township

Area
  - Total: 24.21 sq mi (62.7 km^{2})
  - Land: 24.21 sq mi (62.7 km^{2})
  - Water: 0 sq mi (0 km^{2}) 0%
- Elevation: 830 ft (253 m)

Population (2020)
  - Total: 951
  - Density: 38.4/sq mi (14.8/km^{2})
- Time zone: UTC-5 (Eastern (EST))
  - Summer (DST): UTC-4 (EDT)
- ZIP code: 46733
- Area code: 260
- GNIS feature ID: 453526

Kirkland Township is one of twelve townships in Adams County, Indiana. As of the 2020 census, its population was 951, up from 929 at the 2010 census.

== Geography ==
According to the 2010 census, the township has a total land area of 24.21 square miles (62.7 km^{2}).

=== Unincorporated towns ===
- Curryville
- Honduras
- Peterson

(This list is based on USGS data and may include former settlements.)

=== Adjacent townships ===
- Preble Township (north)
- Root Township (northeast)
- Washington Township (east)
- Monroe Township (southeast)
- French Township (south)
- Harrison Township, Wells County (southwest)
- Lancaster Township, Wells County (west)
- Jefferson Township, Wells County (northwest)

=== Cemeteries ===
The township contains these cemeteries: Pleasant Dale (Steele), Shady, St. Luke UCC, and Zion (Cline).

=== Major highways ===
- US 224

== School districts ==
- Adams Central Community Schools

== Political districts ==
- Indiana's 3rd congressional district
- State House District 79
- State Senate District 19
