= WDBF-LP =

- Decatur, Indiana; United States
- Broadcast area: Decatur, Indiana
- Frequency: 103.5 MHz
- Branding: 103.5 Brave Nation

Programming
- Format: Classic Rock

History
- First air date: August 2016

Technical information
- Licensing authority: FCC
- Transmitter coordinates: 40°50′12″N 84°54′45″W

Links
- Public license information: LMS

WDBF-LP, branded as 103.5 Brave Nation, is a radio station licensed to Decatur, Indiana broadcasting from the Hoosier Pattern Studio located in Bellmont High School which is part of North Adams Community Schools. The station broadcasts a classic rock format at 103.5 on the FM dial.

== History ==
WDBF-LP was constructed over the summer of 2016 primarily by Jovan Mrvos, a former radio DJ in the Chicago area. The station is constructed inside of Bellmont High School and broadcasts from the nearby administrative building on the campus of Bellmont High School.

The radio station, branded as 103.5 Brave Nation, is almost completely run by students. On the weekends, the station features various shows such as syndicated Pink Floyd program "Floydian Slip."
