= Peterson, Indiana =

- Unincorporated community
- Adams County's location in Indiana

- Location in Adams County
- Coordinates: 40°48′47″N 85°00′53″W
- Country: United States
- State: Indiana
- County: Adams
- Township: Kirkland
- Named after: Smith Peterson
- Elevation: 817 ft (249 m)
- Time zone: UTC-5 (Eastern (EST))
  - Summer (DST): UTC-4 (EDT)
- ZIP code: 46733
- Area code: 260
- FIPS code: 18-59382
- GNIS feature ID: 441058

Peterson is an unincorporated community in Kirkland Township, Adams County, in the U.S. state of Indiana.

== History ==
Peterson was named for Smith Peterson, who was instrumental in bringing the railroad to the settlement. A post office was established at Peterson in 1880, and remained in operation until it was discontinued in 1940.
