= Ceylon, Indiana =

- Unincorporated community
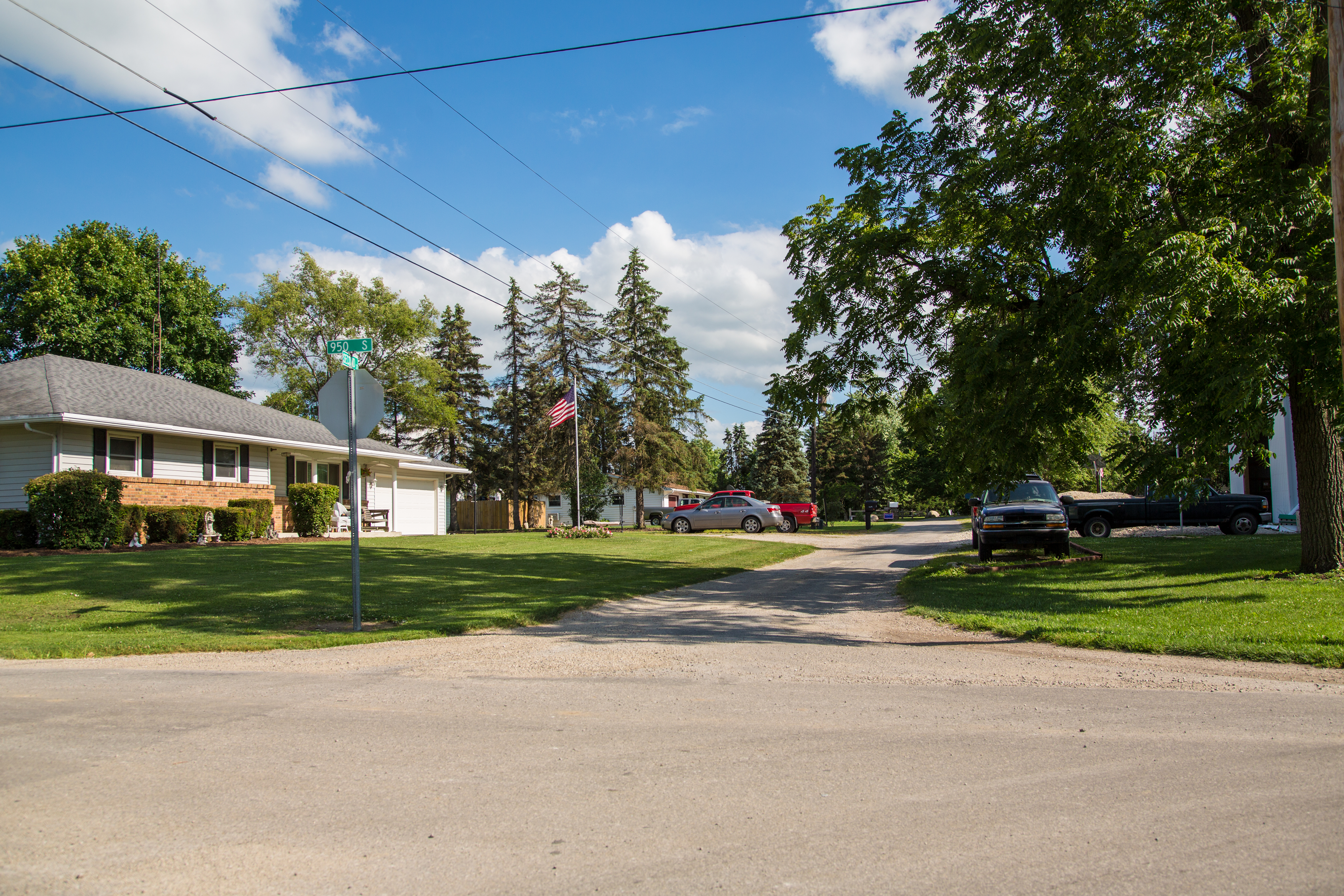

- Adams County's location in Indiana

- Location in Adams County
- Coordinates: 40°36′24″N 84°57′12″W
- Country: United States
- State: Indiana
- County: Adams
- Township: Wabash
- Elevation: 853 ft (260 m)
- Time zone: UTC-5 (Eastern (EST))
  - Summer (DST): UTC-4 (EDT)
- ZIP code: 46740
- Area code: 260
- FIPS code: 18-11908
- GNIS feature ID: 432377

Ceylon is an unincorporated community in Wabash Township, Adams County, in the U.S. state of Indiana.

== History ==
A post office was established at Ceylon in 1884, and remained in operation until it was discontinued in 1895. Ceylon was likely named after the British colony of Ceylon.
