= Preble Township, Adams County, Indiana =

Preble Township
- Township
- Location in Adams County
- Coordinates: 40°52′34″N 85°01′59″W
- Country: United States
- State: Indiana
- County: Adams

Government
  - Type: Indiana township

Area
  - Total: 23.94 sq mi (62.0 km^{2})
  - Land: 23.85 sq mi (61.8 km^{2})
  - Water: 0.08 sq mi (0.21 km^{2}) 0.33%
- Elevation: 801 ft (244 m)

Population (2020)
  - Total: 1,037
  - Density: 44.8/sq mi (17.3/km^{2})
- Time zone: UTC-5 (Eastern (EST))
  - Summer (DST): UTC-4 (EDT)
- ZIP codes: 46733, 46777
- Area code: 260
- GNIS feature ID: 453776

Preble Township is one of twelve townships in Adams County, Indiana. As of the 2020 census, its population was 1,037, down from 1,069 at the 2010 census.

== Geography ==
According to the 2010 census, the township has a total area of 23.94 square miles (62.0 km^{2}), of which 23.85 square miles (61.8 km^{2}) (or 99.62%) is land and 0.08 square miles (0.21 km^{2}) (or 0.33%) is water.

=== Unincorporated towns ===
- Magley
- Preble

=== Adjacent townships ===
- Washington Township (southeast)
- Kirkland Township

=== Cemeteries ===
The township contains the following cemeteries: Fuhrman (abandoned), Magley (also known as Salem or UCC), Mann, St. John Lutheran (Bingen), St. Paul Lutheran, and Zion Lutheran (Friedheim).

=== Major highways ===
- US 27
- US 33
- US 224

=== Rivers ===
- Saint Mary's River

== School districts ==
- North Adams Community Schools

== Political districts ==
- Indiana's 6th congressional district
- State House District 79
- State Senate District 19
