= French Township, Adams County, Indiana =

French Township
- Township
- Location in Adams County
- Coordinates: 40°42′03″N 85°01′48″W
- Country: United States
- State: Indiana
- County: Adams

Government
  - Type: Indiana township

Area
  - Total: 23.94 sq mi (62.0 km^{2})
  - Land: 23.86 sq mi (61.8 km^{2})
  - Water: 0.08 sq mi (0.21 km^{2}) 0.33%
- Elevation: 866 ft (264 m)

Population (2020)
  - Total: 1,244
  - Density: 45.4/sq mi (17.5/km^{2})
- Time zone: UTC-5 (Eastern (EST))
  - Summer (DST): UTC-4 (EDT)
- ZIP codes: 46711, 46714, 46733, 46772
- Area code: 260
- GNIS feature ID: 453318

Historical population
Census	Pop.	Note	%±
1940	787		—
1950	702		−10.8%
1960	718		2.3%
1970	733		2.1%
1980	834		13.8%
1990	888		6.5%
2000	1,019		14.8%
2010	1,083		6.3%
2020	1,244		14.9%
U.S. Census:

French Township is one of twelve townships in Adams County, Indiana. As of the 2020 census, its population was 1,244, up from 1,083 at the 2010 census.

== Geography ==
According to the 2010 census, the township has a total area of 23.94 square miles (62.0 km^{2}), of which 23.86 square miles (61.8 km^{2}) (or 99.67%) is land and 0.08 square miles (0.21 km^{2}) (or 0.33%) is water.

=== Adjacent townships ===
- Kirkland Township (north)
- Washington Township (northeast)
- Monroe Township (east)
- Wabash Township (southeast)
- Hartford Township (south)
- Harrison Township, Wells County (west)

=== Major highways ===
- SR 116
- SR 124
- SR 218

=== Cemeteries ===
The township contains these cemeteries: Biberstein (Moser), Evangelical Mennonite (also known as Defenseless Mennonite or Égly), French (Reynolds), Huser Family, and Moser Family.

=== Rivers ===
- Wabash River

== School districts ==
- Adams Central Community Schools
- South Adams Schools

== Political districts ==
- Indiana's 6th congressional district
- State House District 79
- State Senate District 19
