= Salem, Adams County, Indiana =

- Unincorporated community
- Adams County's location in Indiana

- Salem's location in Adams County
- Coordinates: 40°43′01″N 84°51′12″W
- Country: United States
- State: Indiana
- County: Adams County
- Township: Blue Creek
- Platted: 1866
- Elevation: 827 ft (252 m)
- Time zone: UTC-5 (Eastern (EST))
  - Summer (DST): UTC-4 (EDT)
- ZIP code: 46772
- Area code: 260
- GNIS feature ID: 442875

Salem is an unincorporated community in Blue Creek Township, Adams County, in the U.S. state of Indiana.

== History ==
Salem was platted in 1866.

== Geography ==
Salem is located approximately 4 miles west-southwest of Willshire, Ohio, on Salem Rd. approximately 3 miles west of the Indiana-Ohio state line, at latitude 40.717 and longitude -84.853. The average elevation is 823 feet.
