= Wabash Township, Adams County, Indiana =

Wabash Township
- Township
- Location in Adams County
- Coordinates: 40°36′52″N 84°56′15″W
- Country: United States
- State: Indiana
- County: Adams

Government
  - Type: Indiana township

Area
  - Total: 36.57 sq mi (94.7 km^{2})
  - Land: 36.13 sq mi (93.6 km^{2})
  - Water: 0.44 sq mi (1.1 km^{2}) 1.20%
- Elevation: 823 ft (251 m)

Population (2020)
  - Total: 6,545
  - Density: 172.2/sq mi (66.5/km^{2})
- Time zone: UTC-5 (Eastern (EST))
  - Summer (DST): UTC-4 (EDT)
- ZIP codes: 46711, 46740, 47326
- Area code: 260
- GNIS feature ID: 453962

Historical population
Census	Pop.	Note	%±
1920	2,788		—
1930	2,785		−0.1%
1940	3,083		10.7%
1950	3,190		3.5%
1960	3,566		11.8%
1970	4,004		12.3%
1980	4,782		19.4%
1990	5,394		12.8%
2000	5,854		8.5%
2010	6,223		6.3%
2020	6,545		5.2%
US Census:

Wabash Township is one of twelve townships in Adams County, Indiana. As of the 2020 census, its population was 6,545, up from 6,223 at the 2010 census.

== Geography ==
According to the 2010 census, the township has a total area of 36.57 square miles (94.7 km^{2}), of which 36.13 square miles (93.6 km^{2}) (or 98.80%) is land and 0.44 square miles (1.1 km^{2}) (or 1.20%) is water.

=== Cities, towns, villages ===
- Berne (south half)
- Geneva

=== Unincorporated towns ===
- Ceylon

=== Adjacent townships ===
- Monroe Township (north)
- Blue Creek Township (northeast)
- Jefferson Township (east)
- Bearcreek Township, Jay County (south)
- Jackson Township, Jay County (southwest)
- Hartford Township (west)
- French Township (northwest)

=== Cemeteries ===
The township contains these cemeteries: Bunker Hill Amish, Bunker Hill (Baker Family), Collins (Ceylon), Crawford (also known as Rawley or Prairie Burying), Cross/Kross Reformed (Hoffstetter), MRE (Mennonite Reformed Evangelical), Nussbaum Family (no longer exists), Riverside, Snow, Studebaker, and Westlawn (Pyle).

=== Major highways ===
- US 27
- SR 116
- SR 218

=== Rivers ===
- Wabash River

=== Lakes ===
- Rainbow Lake

=== Landmarks ===
- Lehman Park

== School districts ==
- South Adams Schools

== Political districts ==
- Indiana's 6th congressional district
- State House District 79
- State Senate District 19
