= Monroe, Adams County, Indiana =

Monroe, Indiana
- Town
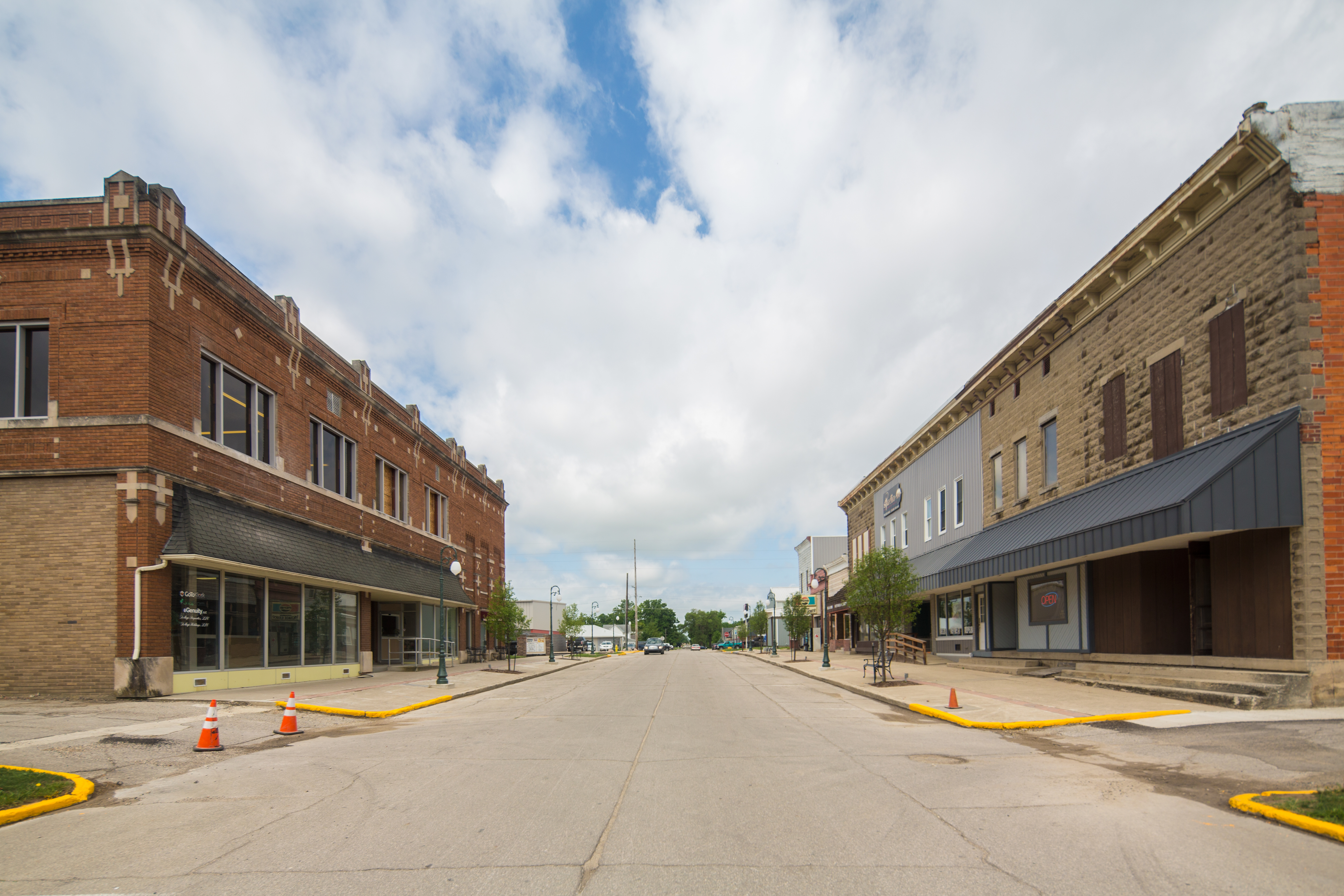
- Downtown Monroe

- Location of Monroe in Adams County, Indiana.
- Coordinates: 40°44′50″N 84°56′27″W
- Country: United States
- State: Indiana
- County: Adams
- Townships: Washington and Monroe
- Platted: 1847
- Incorporated: 1906
- Named for: James Monroe

Area
  - Total: 0.68 sq mi (1.76 km^{2})
  - Land: 0.68 sq mi (1.76 km^{2})
  - Water: 0 sq mi (0.00 km^{2})
- Elevation: 824 ft (251 m)

Population (2020)
  - Total: 885
  - Density: 1,302.3/sq mi (502.82/km^{2})
- Time zone: UTC-5 (EST)
  - Summer (DST): UTC-4 (EDT)
- ZIP code: 46772
- Area code: 260
- FIPS code: 18-50202
- GNIS feature ID: 2396771
- Website: www.townofmonroe.com

Monroe is a town in Washington and Monroe townships, Adams County, Indiana, United States. The population of the town was 885 residents as of the 2020 census. Adams Central Community Schools is located in Monroe.

== History ==
Monroe was platted in 1847 and incorporated in 1906. It was named for James Monroe, fifth President of the United States.

Monroe was originally the Adams County seat but this was moved to Decatur after flooding problems in the town.

The Monroe area has consistently been the American region with the highest percentage of people descended from those of Swiss nationality. Most local residents who have Swiss heritage are of Anabaptist faith, or have Swiss Mennonite and Swiss Amish backgrounds, as this area of Indiana was settled by Swiss Anabaptists in the 1800s. Local Amish still speak a Swiss German dialect, which is distinct from most other Amish, who speak a Pennsylvania German dialect.

== Geography ==
According to the 2010 census, Monroe has a total area of 0.63 square miles (1.63 km^{2}), all land.

== Demographics ==
Historical population
Census	Pop.	Note	%±
1880	97		—
1910	334		—
1920	384		15.0%
1930	322		−16.1%
1940	405		25.8%
1950	428		5.7%
1960	499		16.6%
1970	622		24.6%
1980	739		18.8%
1990	788		6.6%
2000	734		−6.9%
2010	842		14.7%
2020	885		5.1%
U.S. Decennial Census

=== 2010 census ===
As of the census of 2010, there were 842 people, 310 households, and 239 families living in the town. The population density was 1,336.5 inhabitants per square mile (516.0/km^{2}). There were 322 housing units at an average density of 511.1 per square mile (197.3/km^{2}). The racial makeup of the town was 99.0% White, 0.2% Asian, 0.1% from other races, and 0.6% from two or more races. Hispanic or Latino of any race were 2.3% of the population.

There were 310 households, of which 41.0% had children under the age of 18 living with them, 60.6% were married couples living together, 11.6% had a female householder with no husband present, 4.8% had a male householder with no wife present, and 22.9% were non-families. 21.9% of all households were made up of individuals, and 11.3% had someone living alone who was 65 years of age or older. The average household size was 2.72 and the average family size was 3.15.

The median age in the town was 34.7 years. 30.4% of residents were under the age of 18; 6.7% were between the ages of 18 and 24; 25% were from 25 to 44; 23.2% were from 45 to 64; and 14.8% were 65 years of age or older. The gender makeup of the town was 47.3% male and 52.7% female.

=== 2000 census ===
As of the census of 2000, there were 734 people, 274 households, and 215 families living in the town. The population density was 1,529.3 inhabitants per square mile (590.5/km^{2}). There were 287 housing units at an average density of 598.0 per square mile (230.9/km^{2}). The racial makeup of the town was 97.82% White, 0.14% Native American, 0.41% from other races, and 1.63% from two or more races. Hispanic or Latino of any race were 3.13% of the population. The town holds the distinction of the having the highest percentage of people with Swiss ancestry, followed by nearby Berne, Indiana, according to the 2000 U.S. Census.

There were 274 households, out of which 36.5% had children under the age of 18 living with them, 66.8% were married couples living together, 8.8% had a female householder with no husband present, and 21.5% were non-families. 19.7% of all households were made up of individuals, and 10.2% had someone living alone who was 65 years of age or older. The average household size was 2.68 and the average family size was 3.09.

In the town, the population was spread out, with 27.1% under the age of 18, 9.4% from 18 to 24, 26.4% from 25 to 44, 21.7% from 45 to 64, and 15.4% who were 65 years of age or older. The median age was 35 years. For every 100 females, there were 96.8 males. For every 100 females age 18 and over, there were 96.0 males.

The median income for a household in the town was $42,946, and the median income for a family was $49,821. Males had a median income of $32,308 versus $25,750 for females. The per capita income for the town was $16,682. About 1.4% of families and 4.0% of the population were below the poverty line, including 2.9% of those under age 18 and 11.8% of those age 65 or over.
