= Curryville, Indiana =

- Unincorporated community
- Curryville, as seen in a map of Wells County
- Coordinates: 40°47′11″N 85°04′19″W
- Country: United States
- State: Indiana
- County: Adams, Wells
- Townships: Kirkland, Lancaster
- Platted: 1859
- Elevation: 840 ft (260 m)
- Time zone: UTC-5 (Eastern (EST))
  - Summer (DST): UTC-4 (EDT)
- ZIP code: 46792
- Area code: 260
- GNIS feature ID: 433257

Curryville is an unincorporated community in Adams and Wells Counties, in the U.S. state of Indiana.

== History ==
Curryville was platted in 1859. A post office was established at Curryville in 1879, and remained in operation until it was discontinued in 1907.
