= Preble, Indiana =

- Unincorporated community and Census-designated place
- Adams County's location in Indiana

- Location in Adams County
- Coordinates: 40°49′57″N 85°00′13″W
- Country: United States
- State: Indiana
- County: Adams
- Township: Preble
- Elevation: 810 ft (250 m)
- Time zone: UTC-5 (Eastern (EST))
  - Summer (DST): UTC-4 (EDT)
- ZIP code: 46782
- Area code: 260
- FIPS code: 18-61866
- GNIS feature ID: 2830299

Preble is an unincorporated community in Preble Township, Adams County, in the U.S. state of Indiana. It is approximately 4 miles west of Decatur, Indiana.

== History ==
A post office was established in Preble in 1883. The community was named after Preble Township.

== Sites ==
Preble currently includes a post office, a volunteer fire department, a granary, and an outdoor arena.

== Demographics ==
The United States Census Bureau defined Preble as a census designated place in the 2022 American Community Survey.
