= Linn Grove, Indiana =

- Unincorporated community and Census-designated place
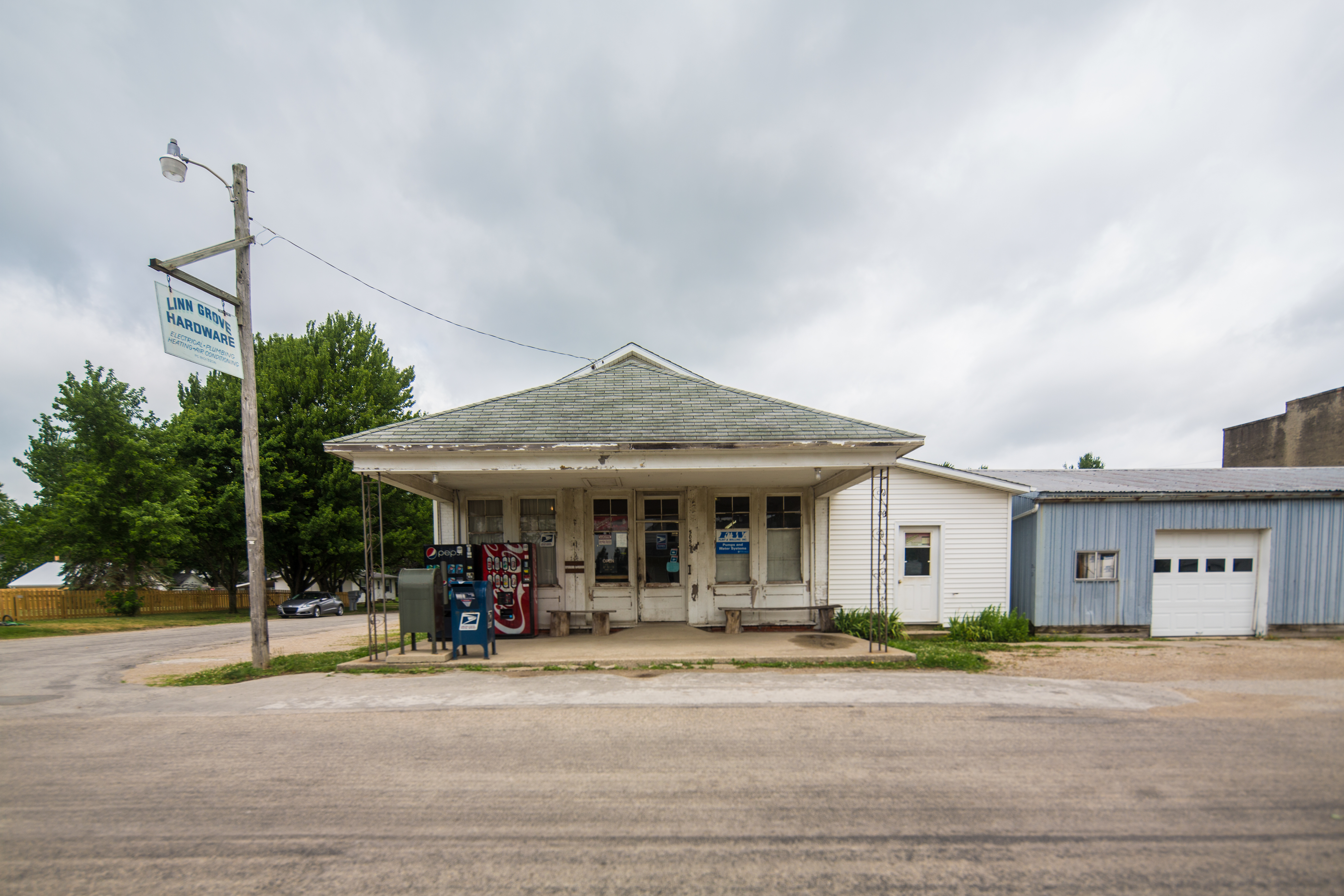

- Adams County's location in Indiana

- Location in Adams County
- Coordinates: 40°38′41″N 85°02′06″W
- Country: United States
- State: Indiana
- County: Adams
- Township: Hartford
- Elevation: 833 ft (254 m)
- Time zone: UTC-5 (Eastern (EST))
  - Summer (DST): UTC-4 (EDT)
- ZIP code: 46711
- Area code: 260
- FIPS code: 18-44154
- GNIS feature ID: 2830297

Linn Grove is an unincorporated community in Hartford Township, Adams County, in the U.S. state of Indiana.

== History ==
The first post office at Linn Grove was established as "Linn" in 1848. It is still currently in operation.

== Demographics ==
The United States Census Bureau delineated Linn Grove as a census designated place in the 2022 American Community Survey.
