= Honduras, Indiana =

- Unincorporated community
- Adams County's location in Indiana

- Location in Adams County
- Coordinates: 40°45′29″N 85°01′59″W
- Country: United States
- State: Indiana
- County: Adams
- Township: Kirkland
- Elevation: 840 ft (260 m)
- Time zone: UTC-5 (Eastern (EST))
  - Summer (DST): UTC-4 (EDT)
- ZIP code: 46733
- Area code: 260
- GNIS feature ID: 436378

Honduras is an unincorporated community in Kirkland Township, Adams County, in the U.S. state of Indiana. All that remains today is a church and its activity center.

== History ==
Honduras was most likely established sometime around 1870. A post office was established at Honduras in 1890, and remained in operation until it was discontinued in 1904. A general store was in business in the early 1900s. The community was likely named after Honduras, in Latin America.
