= Hartford Township, Adams County, Indiana =

Hartford Township
- Township
- Location in Adams County
- Coordinates: 40°36′58″N 85°01′41″W
- Country: United States
- State: Indiana
- County: Adams

Government
  - Type: Indiana township

Area
  - Total: 24.08 sq mi (62.4 km^{2})
  - Land: 24 sq mi (62 km^{2})
  - Water: 0.08 sq mi (0.21 km^{2}) 0.33%
- Elevation: 843 ft (257 m)

Population (2020)
  - Total: 981
  - Density: 36.3/sq mi (14.0/km^{2})
- Time zone: UTC-5 (Eastern (EST))
  - Summer (DST): UTC-4 (EDT)
- ZIP codes: 46711, 46714, 46740
- Area code: 260
- GNIS feature ID: 453402

Historical population
| Census | Pop. | Note | %± |
|---|---|---|---|
| 1940 | 910 | | — |
| 1950 | 841 | | −7.6% |
| 1960 | 770 | | −8.4% |
| 1970 | 784 | | 1.8% |
| 1980 | 775 | | −1.1% |
| 1990 | 816 | | 5.3% |
| 2000 | 880 | | 7.8% |
| 2010 | 872 | | −0.9% |
| 2020 | 981 | | 12.5% |
US Census:

Hartford Township is one of twelve townships in Adams County, Indiana. At the 2020 census, its population was 981, up from 872 at the 2010 census.

== Geography ==
According to the 2010 census, the township has a total area of 24.08 square miles (62.4 km^{2}), of which 24 square miles (62 km^{2}) (or 99.67%) is land and 0.08 square miles (0.21 km^{2}) (or 0.33%) is water.

=== Unincorporated towns ===
- Linn Grove
- Perryville

(This list is based on USGS data and may include former settlements.)

=== Adjacent townships ===
- French Township (north)
- Monroe Township (northeast)
- Wabash Township (east)
- Bearcreek Township, Jay County (southeast)
- Jackson Township, Jay County (south)
- Nottingham Township, Wells County (west)
- Harrison Township, Wells County (northwest)

=== Major highways ===
- SR 116
- SR 218

=== Cemeteries ===
The township contains these cemeteries: Alberson, Brown (Glendening), Greenwood (also known as Steiner, Linn Grove, or Buena Vista) and Hartford (Stringtown).

== School districts ==
- South Adams Schools

== Political districts ==
- Indiana's 6th congressional district
- State House District 79
- State Senate District 19
