= Union Township, Adams County, Indiana =

Union Township
- Township
- Location in Adams County
- Coordinates: 40°52′33″N 84°50′30″W
- Country: United States
- State: Indiana
- County: Adams

Government
  - Type: Indiana township

Area
  - Total: 24.75 sq mi (64.1 km^{2})
  - Land: 24.75 sq mi (64.1 km^{2})
  - Water: 0 sq mi (0 km^{2}) 0%
- Elevation: 827 ft (252 m)

Population (2020)
  - Total: 905
  - Density: 37.3/sq mi (14.4/km^{2})
- Time zone: UTC-5 (Eastern (EST))
  - Summer (DST): UTC-4 (EDT)
- ZIP codes: 46733, 46773
- Area code: 260
- GNIS feature ID: 453906

Union Township is one of twelve townships in Adams County, Indiana. As of the 2020 census, its population was 905, down from 922 from the 2010 census.

== Geography ==
According to the 2010 census, the township has a total area of 24.75 square miles (64.1 km^{2}), all land.

=== Cemeteries ===
The township contains these cemeteries: Alpha (Bethel), Clark Chapel, Immanuel Lutheran (Bleeke), Salem and Saint John Reformed.

=== Major highways ===
- US 224
- SR 101

=== Airports and landing strips ===
- Decatur Hi-Way Airport

== School districts ==
- North Adams Community Schools

== Political districts ==
- Indiana's 6th congressional district
- State House District 79
- State Senate District 19
