= Jefferson Township, Adams County, Indiana =

Jefferson Township
- Township
- Location in Adams County
- Coordinates: 40°36′48″N 84°50′40″W
- Country: United States
- State: Indiana
- County: Adams

Government
  - Type: Indiana township

Area
  - Total: 24.13 sq mi (62.5 km^{2})
  - Land: 24.1 sq mi (62 km^{2})
  - Water: 0.03 sq mi (0.078 km^{2}) 0.12%
- Elevation: 860 ft (262 m)

Population (2020)
  - Total: 1,363
  - Density: 56.6/sq mi (21.8/km^{2})
- Time zone: UTC-5 (Eastern (EST))
  - Summer (DST): UTC-4 (EDT)
- ZIP codes: 46711, 46740, 47326
- Area code: 260
- GNIS feature ID: 453477

Jefferson Township is one of twelve townships in Adams County, Indiana. As of the 2020 census, its population was 1,363, up from 1,089 at the previous census.

According to the "2020 American Community Survey 5-Year Estimates", 33.9% of the township's population spoke only English, while 63.9 spoke an "other [than Spanish] Indo-European language" (basically Pennsylvania German/German).

== Geography ==
According to the 2010 census, the township has a total area of 24.13 square miles (62.5 km^{2}), of which 24.1 square miles (62 km^{2}) (or 99.88%) is land and 0.03 square miles (0.078 km^{2}) (or 0.12%) is water.

=== Major highways ===
- SR 116
- SR 218

Historical population
Census	Pop.	Note	%±
1930	706		—
1940	700		−0.8%
1950	684		−2.3%
1960	625		−8.6%
1970	614		−1.8%
1980	735		19.7%
1990	848		15.4%
2000	947		11.7%
2010	1,089		15.0%
2020	1,363		25.2%
US Census:

=== Cemeteries ===
The township contains the following cemeteries: Loofborrow, Rumple (also known as Cook- no longer exists), and St. Mary Catholic.

== School districts ==
- South Adams Schools

== Political districts ==
- Indiana's 6th congressional district
- State House District 79
- State Senate District 19
