= Geneva Downtown Commercial Historic District (Geneva, Indiana) =

Historic district in Indiana, United States

- U.S. National Register of Historic Places
- U.S. Historic district
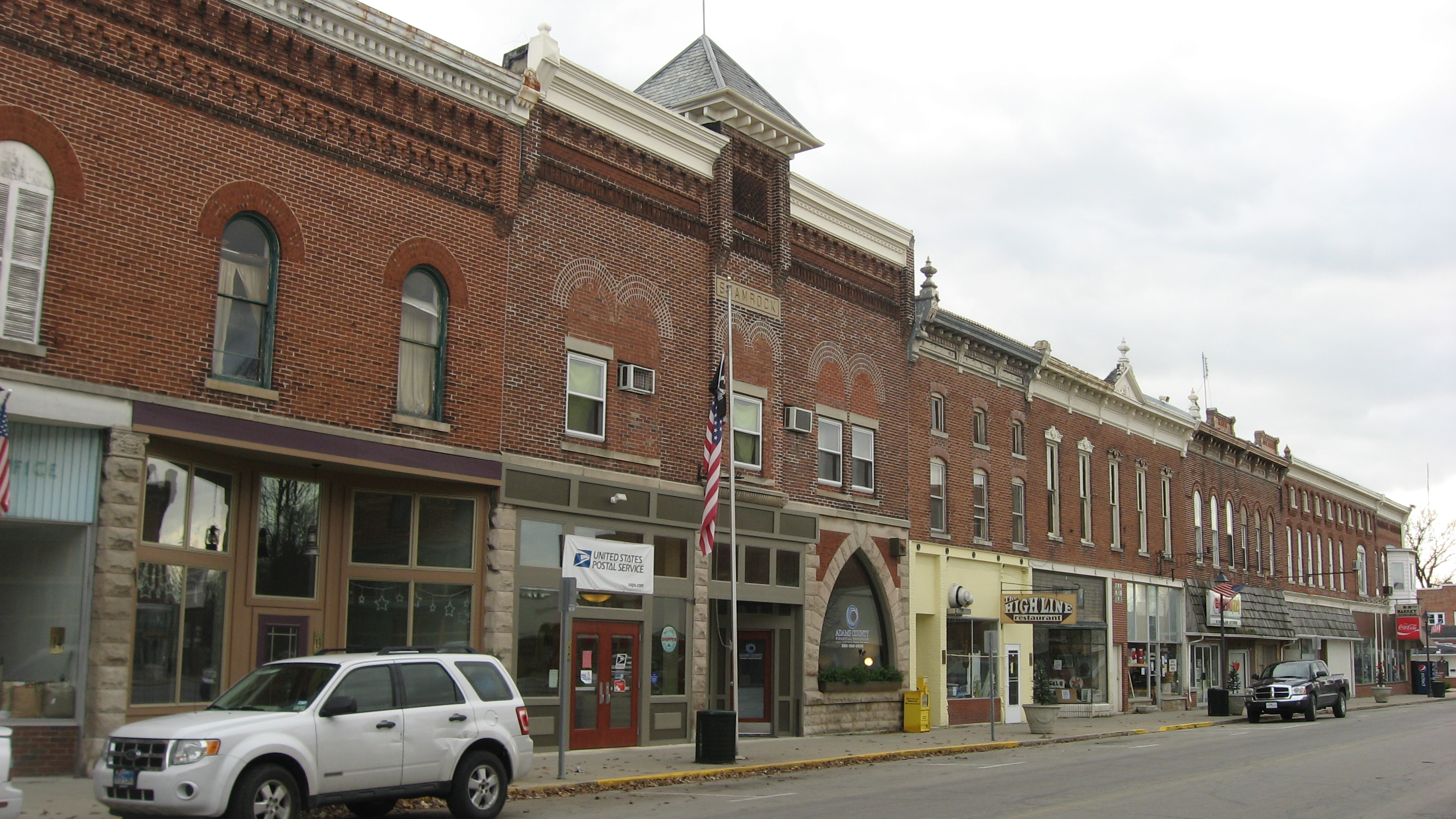
- Geneva Downtown Commercial Historic District, November 2011

- Location within Adams County, Indiana Location within Indiana Location within the United States
- Location: 144-455 E. Line St., Geneva, Indiana
- Coordinates: 40°35′33″N 84°57′33″W
- Area: 5 acres (2.0 ha)
- Built: 1882
- Architectural style: Romanesque, Italianate, et al.
- NRHP reference No.: 02000196
- Added to NRHP: March 21, 2002

Geneva Downtown Commercial Historic District is a national historic district located at Geneva, Indiana, USA. It encompasses 22 contributing buildings in the central business district of Geneva. were built between about 1882 and 1930, and include notable examples of Italianate and Romanesque Revival style commercial architecture. Notable buildings include the M.E. Hutton Carriage Shop (1895–1896), Briggs Hardware (1882), Shamrock Block (c. 1885), and the Independent Order of Odd Fellows building (1906).

In the 1890s, there was a large increase in population due to the oil industry boom. In 1895, many wooden buildings were burned down, causing the Geneva Board of Trustees to ban wooden buildings and only buildings made of concrete or metal materials.

It was listed on the National Register of Historic Places in 2002.

In 2006, a historical marker was erected on Line and High Streets by the Indiana Historical Bureau, Adams County Community Foundation, and Geneva Proud/Geneva Chamber of Commerce.
