= North Adams Community Schools =

School district in Indiana, United States

Address
- 625 Stadium Drive Decatur, Indiana, 46733; United States

District information
- Type: Public
- Motto: "Good at learning. Good at life."
- Grades: K–12
- Superintendent: Kim Hiatt
- Asst. superintendent(s): Lori Baumer
- Business administrator: Beth Quinn
- Schools: 3
- NCES District ID: 1807680

Students and staff
- Students: 1,579 (2023-2024)
- Teachers: 120.00 (FTE)
- Staff: 318.42 (FTE)
- Student–teacher ratio: 13:1
- Colors

Other information
- Website: www.nadams.k12.in.us

North Adams Community Schools is a public school system located in Decatur, Indiana and serves the surrounding area.

== Geography ==
The school district lies within northern Adams County.

== See also ==
- Bellmont High School
