= Adams Central Community Schools =

School district in Indiana

Address
- 200 W. Washington Street Monroe, Indiana, 46772; United States

District information
- Type: Public school district
- Grades: K–12
- Superintendent: Joel Mahaffey
- Schools: 3

Students and staff
- Students: 1,360 (2023-2024)
- Teachers: 97.0 (on FTE basis)
- Staff: 178.49 (on FTE basis)
- Student–teacher ratio: 14:1
- Colors: Red and white

Other information
- Website: www.accs.k12.in.us

Adams Central Community Schools is a public school system located in Monroe, Indiana and serves the surrounding area. The elementary, middle, and high school of Adams Central all share the same building.

== Geography ==
The school district lies within central Adams County. Its jurisdiction covers all of Monroe and Pleasant Mills as well as a part of Preble.

== Sports ==
Their Football, Wrestling, and Softball programs have been very successful in recent years.

Their sports include:

Volleyball (Girls), Football (Boys), Tennis, Cross Country, Swimming, Basketball, Wrestling, Baseball (Boys), Softball (Girls), Golf, Track and Field, Bowling.

== See also ==
- Adams Central High School
