= Blue Creek Township, Adams County, Indiana =

Blue Creek Township
- Township
- Location in Adams County
- Coordinates: 40°41′59″N 84°50′12″W
- Country: United States
- State: Indiana
- County: Adams

Government
  - Type: Indiana township

Area
  - Total: 24.3 sq mi (63 km^{2})
  - Land: 24.3 sq mi (63 km^{2})
  - Water: 0 sq mi (0 km^{2}) 0%
- Elevation: 817 ft (249 m)

Population (2020)
  - Total: 1,540
  - Density: 63.4/sq mi (24.5/km^{2})
- Time zone: UTC-5 (Eastern (EST))
  - Summer (DST): UTC-4 (EDT)
- ZIP codes: 46711, 46733, 46772
- Area code: 260
- GNIS feature ID: 453116

Blue Creek Township is one of twelve townships in Adams County, Indiana. As of the 2020 census, its population was 1,540. The majority of the Township, some two thirds, speak an Amish form of Bernese German, a Swiss German dialect, as their mother tongue.

== Geography ==
According to the 2010 census, the township has a total area of 24.3 square miles (63 km^{2}), all land.

== Demographics ==
Historical population
Census	Pop.	Note	%±
1890	1,212		—
1900	1,127		−7.0%
1910	1,168		3.6%
1920	929		−20.5%
1930	726		−21.9%
1940	780		7.4%
1950	725		−7.1%
1960	692		−4.6%
1970	728		5.2%
1980	813		11.7%
1990	873		7.4%
2000	1,195		36.9%
2010	1,440		20.5%
2020	1,540		6.9%
2021 (est.)	1,579		2.5%
US Census:

=== Unincorporated towns ===
- Salem

=== Major highways ===
- SR 124
- SR 218

=== Cemeteries ===
The township contains the following cemeteries: Blue Creek Amish, Sipe (no longer exists), Tricker (Blue Creek), and Willard (Mt. Hope).

== School districts ==
- Adams Central Community Schools
- South Adams Schools

== Political districts ==
- Indiana's 6th congressional district
- State House District 79
- State Senate District 19
