= Adams County, Indiana =

County in Indiana, United States

- County
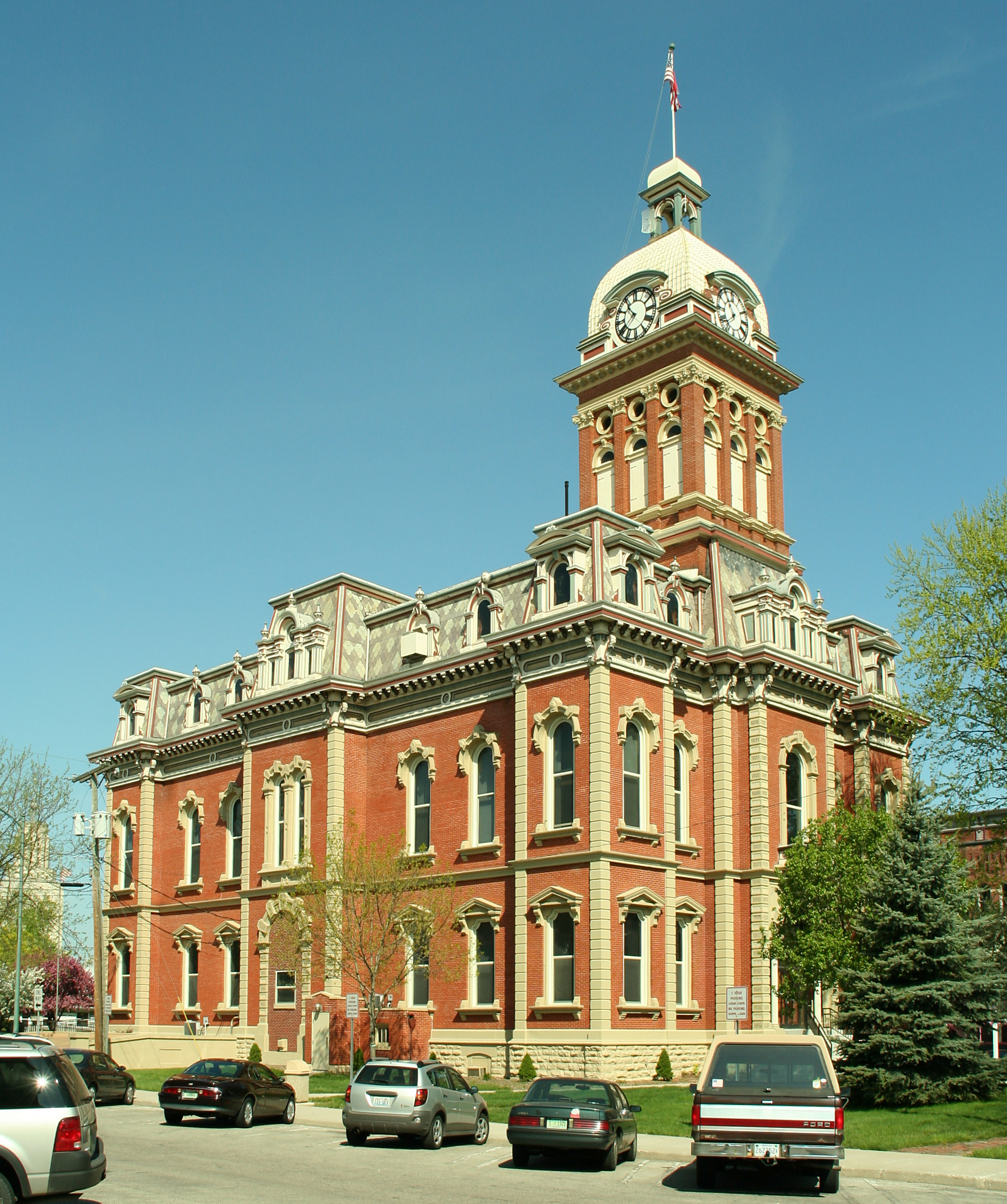
- Adams County Courthouse in Decatur

- Seal Logo

- Location within the U.S. state of Indiana
- Coordinates: 40°45′N 84°56′W
- Country: United States
- State: Indiana
- Founded: March 1, 1836
- Named for: John Quincy Adams
- Seat: Decatur
- Largest city: Decatur

Area
  - Total: 339.97 sq mi (880.5 km^{2})
  - Land: 339.03 sq mi (878.1 km^{2})
  - Water: 0.94 sq mi (2.4 km^{2}) 0.28%

Population (2020)
  - Total: 35,809
  - Estimate (2025): 36,650 ▲
  - Density: 108/sq mi (42/km^{2})
- Time zone: UTC−5 (Eastern)
  - Summer (DST): UTC−4 (EDT)
- Area code: 260
- Congressional district: 3rd
- Website: www.co.adams.in.us
- FIPS No. 001

Adams County lies in northeastern Indiana in the United States and shares its eastern border with Ohio. It was officially established in 1836. The county seat is Decatur. According to the 2020 census, its population was 35,809, an increase of 4.1% from 34,387 in 2010. The county has four incorporated cities and towns with a total population of over 15,000, as well as many small unincorporated communities. The county is divided into 12 townships which provide local services. There are four Indiana state roads in the county, as well as three U.S. Routes and one railroad line. In 2017, about a quarter of the county's population (estimated 8,600) was Swiss Amish that settled in the Southern half of the county around Berne.

== History ==
The statute that mandated the creation of this county was passed on February 7, 1835, and the organization itself was authorized on March 1, 1836. Its name honors the sixth President of the United States, John Quincy Adams. Selection of the county seat was finalized on May 18 of that year.

The first non-Native settlers arrived in what is now Adams County in 1835, encouraged by the new Erie Canal and by the end of the Black Hawk War. They consisted entirely of settlers from New England. These were "Yankee" settlers, that is to say they were descended from the English Puritans who settled New England in the colonial era. They were primarily members of the Congregational Church although due to the Second Great Awakening many of them had converted to Methodism and some had become Baptists before coming to what is now Adams County. The Congregational Church subsequently has gone through many divisions and some factions are now known as the Church of Christ and the United Church of Christ. When these settlers arrived they found dense forest and wild prairie.

The first Amish settlers arrived in 1840; most came directly from Switzerland, preserving their Bernese German dialect, not adopting the Pennsylvania Dutch dialect of the majority of the Amish.

The Yankee settlers commissioned the first courthouse in 1839, a two-story frame building. The log-building jail was completed in 1837. The present Adams County courthouse was built in Decatur in 1872–1873 at a cost of $78,979. (Note: A $79,000 capital expense in 1872 would be roughly equivalent to $18,900,000 in 2010.) The designer was J. C. Johnson, who had been trained as a carpenter and joiner and became a self-taught architect; he won second place in the Indiana State Capitol design competition. The construction was done by Christian Boseker of Fort Wayne. It is built of red brick with stone ornamentation.

Map of Adams County

== Geography ==
According to the 2010 census, the county has a total area of 339.97 square miles (880.5 km^{2}), of which 339.03 square miles (878.1 km^{2}) (or 99.72%) is land and 0.94 square miles (2.4 km^{2}) (or 0.28%) is water.

== Adjacent counties ==
- Allen County (north)
- Van Wert County, Ohio (northeast)
- Mercer County, Ohio (southeast)
- Jay County (south)
- Wells County (west)

The county has four incorporated settlements, all of which lie in a rough north–south line. The city of Decatur is the largest and is also the county seat, and is in the northern part of the county where U.S. Route 27 and U.S. Route 33 intersect with the east–west U.S. Route 224. U.S. Route 27 continues south through the town of Monroe, near the center of the county, and then on through Berne and Geneva.

== Communities ==
=== Cities ===
- Berne
- Decatur
- Geneva
- Monroe

=== Unincorporated communities ===
- Ceylon
- Coppess Corner
- Curryville
- Honduras
- Linn Grove
- Magley
- Monmouth
- Perryville
- Peterson
- Pleasant Mills
- Preble
- Rivare
- Salem
- Williams

=== Townships ===
- Blue Creek
- French
- Hartford
- Jefferson
- Kirkland
- Monroe
- Preble
- Root
- Saint Marys
- Union
- Wabash
- Washington

== Climate and weather ==
Decatur, Indiana

Climate chart (precipitation, max. and min. temperature)
J	F	M	A	M	J	J	A	S	O	N	D
2.2 32 17	2.2 37 21	2.9 48 30	3.7 61 39	3.8 72 50	4.4 81 60	4 84 64	3.7 82 62	3 76 54	2.6 64 43	3.2 50 34	2.8 37 23
- █ Average max. and min. temperatures in °F
- █ Precipitation totals in inches
- Source: The Weather Channel
Metric conversion
J	F	M	A	M	J	J	A	S	O	N	D
55 0 −8	55 3 −6	73 9 −1	93 16 4	96 22 10	112 27 16	103 29 18	95 28 17	77 24 12	66 18 6	82 10 1	70 3 −5
- █ Average max. and min. temperatures in °C
- █ Precipitation totals in mm

Adams County is in the humid continental climate region of the United States along with most of Indiana. Its Köppen climate classification is Dfa, meaning that it is cold, has no dry season, and has a hot summer. In recent years, average temperatures in Decatur have ranged from a low of 17 °F (−8 °C) in January to a high of 84 °F (29 °C) in July, although a record low of −24 °F (−31 °C) was recorded in January 1985 and a record high of 107 °F (42 °C) was recorded in July 1934. Average monthly precipitation ranged from 2.16 inches (55 mm) in February to 4.42 inches (112 mm) in June.

== Demographics ==
Historical population
Census	Pop.	Note	%±
1840	2,264		—
1850	5,797		156.1%
1860	9,252		59.6%
1870	11,382		23.0%
1880	15,385		35.2%
1890	20,181		31.2%
1900	22,232		10.2%
1910	21,840		−1.8%
1920	20,503		−6.1%
1930	19,957		−2.7%
1940	21,254		6.5%
1950	22,393		5.4%
1960	24,643		10.0%
1970	26,871		9.0%
1980	29,619		10.2%
1990	31,095		5.0%
2000	33,625		8.1%
2010	34,387		2.3%
2020	35,809		4.1%
2025 (est.)	36,650	▲	2.3%
U.S. Decennial Census:

=== Racial and ethnic composition ===
Adams County, Indiana – Racial and ethnic composition Note: the US Census treats Hispanic/Latino as an ethnic category. This table excludes Latinos from the racial categories and assigns them to a separate category. Hispanics/Latinos may be of any race.
Race / Ethnicity (NH = Non-Hispanic)	Pop 1980	Pop 1990	Pop 2000	Pop 2010	Pop 2020	% 1980	% 1990	% 2000	% 2010	% 2020
White alone (NH)	28,690	30,152	32,203	32,521	33,080	96.86%	96.97%	95.77%	94.57%	92.38%
Black or African American alone (NH)	7	35	43	102	171	0.02%	0.11%	0.13%	0.30%	0.48%
Native American or Alaska Native alone (NH)	37	37	48	60	80	0.12%	0.12%	0.14%	0.17%	0.22%
Asian alone (NH)	63	55	65	78	135	0.21%	0.18%	0.19%	0.23%	0.38%
Native Hawaiian or Pacific Islander alone (NH)	x	x	7	7	4	x	x	0.02%	0.02%	0.01%
Other race alone (NH)	10	6	5	15	50	0.03%	0.02%	0.01%	0.04%	0.14%
Mixed race or Multiracial (NH)	x	x	136	192	652	x	x	0.40%	0.56%	1.82%
Hispanic or Latino (any race)	812	810	1,118	1,412	1,637	2.74%	2.60%	3.32%	4.11%	4.57%
Total	29,619	31,095	33,625	34,387	35,809	100.00%	100.00%	100.00%	100.00%	100.00%

=== 2020 census ===
As of the 2020 United States census, the county had a population of 35,809. The median age was 34.0 years. 31.2% of residents were under the age of 18 and 16.2% of residents were 65 years of age or older. For every 100 females there were 98.6 males, and for every 100 females age 18 and over there were 97.0 males age 18 and over.

The racial makeup of the county was 94.0% White, 0.5% Black or African American, 0.3% American Indian and Alaska Native, 0.4% Asian, less than 0.1% Native Hawaiian and Pacific Islander, 1.5% from some other race, and 3.3% from two or more races. Hispanic or Latino residents of any race comprised 4.6% of the population.

29.2% of residents lived in urban areas, while 70.8% lived in rural areas.

There were 12,386 households in the county, of which 33.7% had children under the age of 18 living in them. Of all households, 56.8% were married-couple households, 16.3% were households with a male householder and no spouse or partner present, and 21.7% were households with a female householder and no spouse or partner present. About 25.7% of all households were made up of individuals and 12.2% had someone living alone who was 65 years of age or older.

There were 13,172 housing units, of which 6.0% were vacant. Among occupied housing units, 77.4% were owner-occupied and 22.6% were renter-occupied. The homeowner vacancy rate was 1.1% and the rental vacancy rate was 6.9%.

=== 2000 census ===
In 2000 the racial makeup of the county was 97.8% white, 0.6% black or African American, 0.4% Asian, 0.3% American Indian or Alaska Native, and 0.9% from two or more races. Those of Hispanic or Latino origin made up 4.5% of the population. In terms of ancestry, 30.3% were German, 5.6% were Irish, 4.1% were English, and 2.7% were French (not Basque). Additionally, 11.5% of the population has a visible or non-visible disability.

=== Income and poverty ===
The median income for a household in the county was $52,504 and the median income for a family was $65,609. The per capita income for the county was $23,316. About 16.8% of the population were below the poverty line, including 24.5% of those under age 18 and 6.5% of those age 65 or over.

=== Amish community ===
The Amish community in Adams County belongs the Swiss Amish, which is an Amish affiliation whose ancestors came to Adam County in 1840 and who speak a Bernese dialect in everyday life. They had a total population of 8,595 people in 58 congregations in 2017, or 24.2% of the county's population.

== Religion ==
Religion in Adams County, according to ARDA (2020)
1. Evangelical Churches (37.4%)
2. Anabaptist Church (Amish) (22.7%)
3. Catholic Church (8.40%)
4. Mainline Protestant Churches (7.10%)
5. Black Protestant Churches (5.90%)
6. Others (0.90%)
7. None* (17.5%)

*"Nones" is an unclear category. It is a heterogenous group of the not religious and intermittently religious. Researchers argue that most of the "Nones" should be considered "unchurched", rather than objectively nonreligious; especially since most "Nones" do hold some religious-spiritual beliefs and a notable amount participate in behaviors. For example, 72% of American "Nones" believe in God or a Higher Power.

== Transportation ==
Three U.S. Routes cross the county. U.S. Route 27 and U.S. Route 33 enter the north end of the county from Fort Wayne in neighboring Allen County. Passing through Decatur, they split; U.S. Route 27 goes south through Monroe, Berne and Geneva and continues into Jay County, whereas U.S. Route 33 heads southeast into Ohio. U.S. Route 224 passes from west to east through the north part of the county, intersecting U.S. Routes 27 and 33 in Decatur, then continuing into Ohio.

Indiana State Road 124 runs east–west through the county, from Bluffton in Wells County through Monroe and on to the Ohio border. Indiana State Road 101 runs south–north, from State Road 124 near the Ohio border, through Pleasant Mills and Rivare, to Allen County. Indiana State Road 116 runs west–east across the county, from Bluffton southeast to Linn Grove, south to Perryville, then east to a terminus at U.S. Route 27 in Geneva. Indiana State Road 218 runs west–east across the southern end of the county, passing through Berne.

CSX Transportation operates a rail line from Decatur, running northwest toward Fort Wayne.

== Government ==
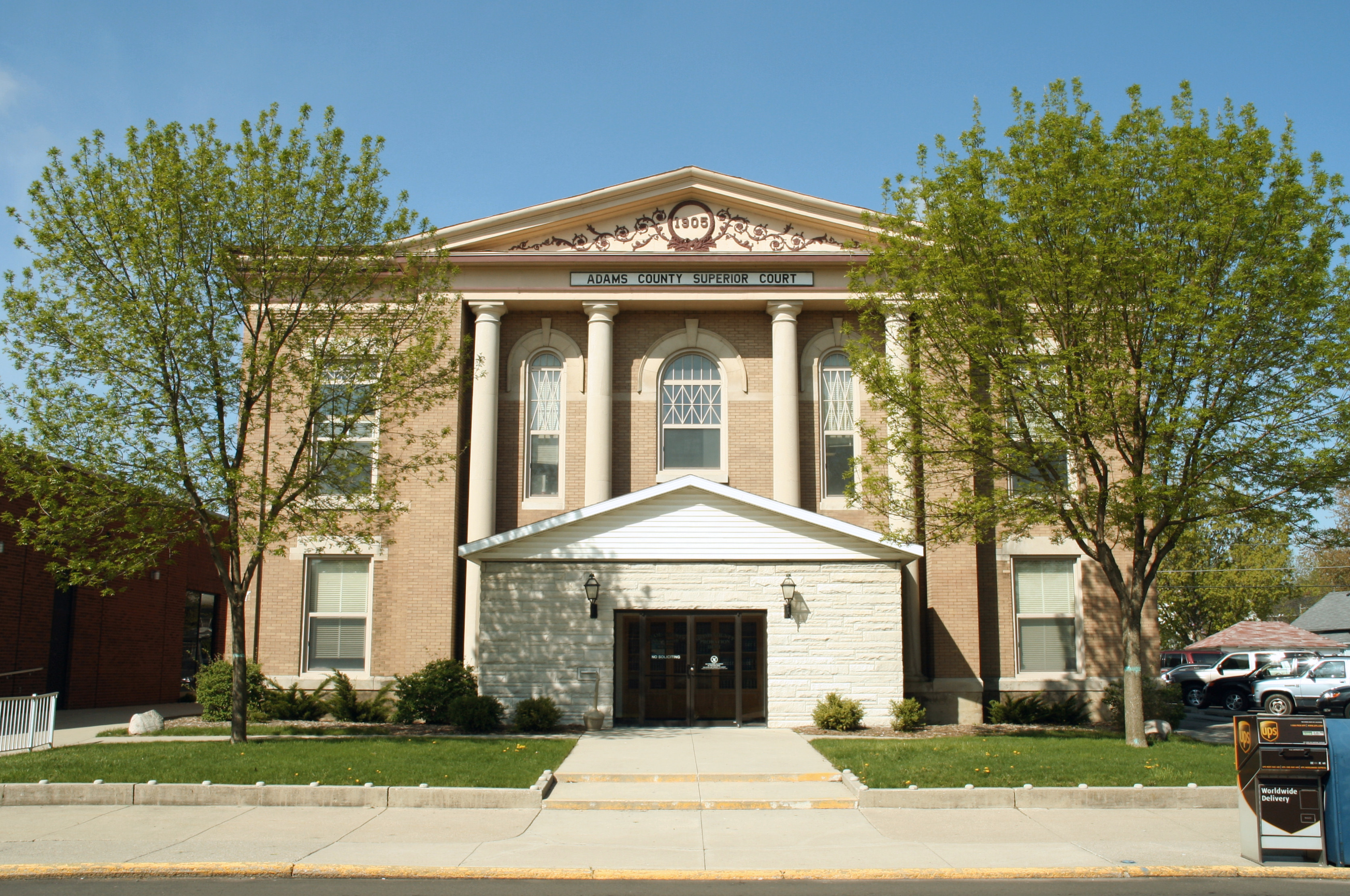
Adams County superior court, Decatur (2006)

The county government is a constitutional body granted specific powers by the Constitution of Indiana and the Indiana Code. The county council is the legislative branch of the county government and controls all spending and revenue collection. Representatives are elected from county districts. The council members serve four-year terms and are responsible for setting salaries, the annual budget and special spending. The council also has limited authority to impose local taxes, in the form of an income and property tax that is subject to state level approval, excise taxes and service taxes. In 2010, the county budgeted approximately $2.2 million for the district's schools and $2.8 million for other county operations and services, for a total annual budget of approximately $5 million.

A Board of Commissioners forms the county's executive body. They are elected county-wide, in staggered four–year terms. One commissioner serves as board president. This board executes the acts of the council, causes necessary revenues to be collected, and manages day-to-day functions of the county government.

The county maintains a small claims court. This court's judge is elected to a term of four years and must be a member of the Indiana Bar Association. The judge is assisted by a constable who is elected to a four-year term. In some cases, court decisions can be appealed to the state level circuit court.

The county has other elected offices, including sheriff, coroner, auditor, treasurer, recorder, surveyor and circuit court clerk. Each of these serves a term of four years and oversees a different part of county government. Members elected to county government positions are required to declare party affiliations and be residents of the county.

Each township has a trustee who administers rural fire protection and ambulance service, provides poor relief, and manages cemetery care. The trustee is assisted by a three-member township board. The trustees and board members are elected to four-year terms.

Adams County is part of Indiana's 3rd congressional district; Indiana Senate district 19; and Indiana House of Representatives district 79.

Politically, Adams County is heavily Republican. It has voted for the Republican presidential nominee in all but one election since 1940.

United States presidential election results for Adams County, Indiana
Year	Republican		Democratic		Third party(ies)	
Year	No.	%	No.	%	No.	%
1888	1,277	29.27%	2,936	67.29%	150	3.44%
1892	1,247	27.92%	2,906	65.05%	314	7.03%
1896	1,613	32.09%	3,340	66.45%	73	1.45%
1900	1,688	32.93%	3,337	65.10%	101	1.97%
1904	1,967	37.92%	2,973	57.32%	247	4.76%
1908	1,726	32.63%	3,404	64.36%	159	3.01%
1912	917	19.08%	2,961	61.62%	927	19.29%
1916	1,796	36.83%	2,875	58.96%	205	4.20%
1920	4,144	51.81%	3,653	45.67%	201	2.51%
1924	3,330	41.34%	4,300	53.38%	425	5.28%
1928	4,045	49.70%	4,066	49.96%	28	0.34%
1932	2,910	32.65%	5,892	66.11%	111	1.25%
1936	3,249	35.28%	5,822	63.23%	137	1.49%
1940	5,247	53.93%	4,382	45.04%	101	1.04%
1944	5,648	58.83%	3,804	39.62%	149	1.55%
1948	4,832	50.10%	4,640	48.11%	173	1.79%
1952	6,204	59.61%	3,744	35.97%	460	4.42%
1956	7,079	66.11%	3,520	32.87%	109	1.02%
1960	6,972	61.11%	4,338	38.02%	99	0.87%
1964	4,230	38.55%	6,637	60.48%	106	0.97%
1968	5,774	51.28%	4,667	41.45%	818	7.27%
1972	7,549	65.24%	3,971	34.32%	52	0.45%
1976	6,280	55.55%	4,908	43.41%	118	1.04%
1980	6,368	53.16%	4,673	39.01%	937	7.82%
1984	7,958	66.58%	3,923	32.82%	71	0.59%
1988	8,137	67.83%	3,811	31.77%	49	0.41%
1992	6,078	47.83%	3,708	29.18%	2,922	22.99%
1996	6,960	55.08%	4,247	33.61%	1,430	11.32%
2000	8,555	67.95%	3,775	29.98%	260	2.07%
2004	9,734	72.97%	3,512	26.33%	94	0.70%
2008	8,404	62.07%	4,928	36.40%	207	1.53%
2012	8,937	68.58%	3,806	29.21%	289	2.22%
2016	9,648	73.12%	2,805	21.26%	741	5.62%
2020	10,686	75.05%	3,236	22.73%	317	2.23%
2024	10,528	75.28%	3,179	22.73%	279	1.99%

== Education ==
Public schools in Adams County are administered by three public entities: North Adams Community Schools; Adams Central Community Schools; and South Adams Schools. The Diocese of Fort Wayne and Lutheran Schools of Indiana both operate in Adams County as well. In all, these organizations operate 13 schools in the county.

== Festivals and Fairs in Adams County ==
- Adams County 4-H Fair (Monroe)
- Swiss Days (Berne)
- Calithumpian Festival (Decatur)
- Festival of Kekionga (Decatur)
- 4th of July Fireworks, (Down Town Decatur)
- Summer Concert Series (Downtown Decatur)
- DeKeggar BBQ and Beer Brewing Competition (Downtown Decatur)
- Highland Games - Old Scottish Style Strength Competition (Downtown Decatur)

== Media ==
=== Radio ===
- WZBD (Berne)

=== Newspapers ===
- The Decatur Daily Democrat (Decatur)
- Berne Tri-Weekly (Berne)

== Notable people ==
- Gene Stratton-Porter (1863 – 1924), author, nature photographer, naturalist, and silent movie-era producer, lived in Decatur and Geneva 1886–1913.
- Chemist Richard R. Schrock, 2005 Nobel Prize winner in organic chemistry, was born in Berne in 1945 and attended school in Decatur.
- Director David Anspaugh (born 1946), who directed the movies Hoosiers and Rudy, was born in Decatur.
- Sculptor David Smith (1906 – 1965) was born in Decatur.

== See also ==
- List of public art in Indiana § Adams
- National Register of Historic Places listings in Adams County, Indiana
