= Decatur, Indiana =

- City
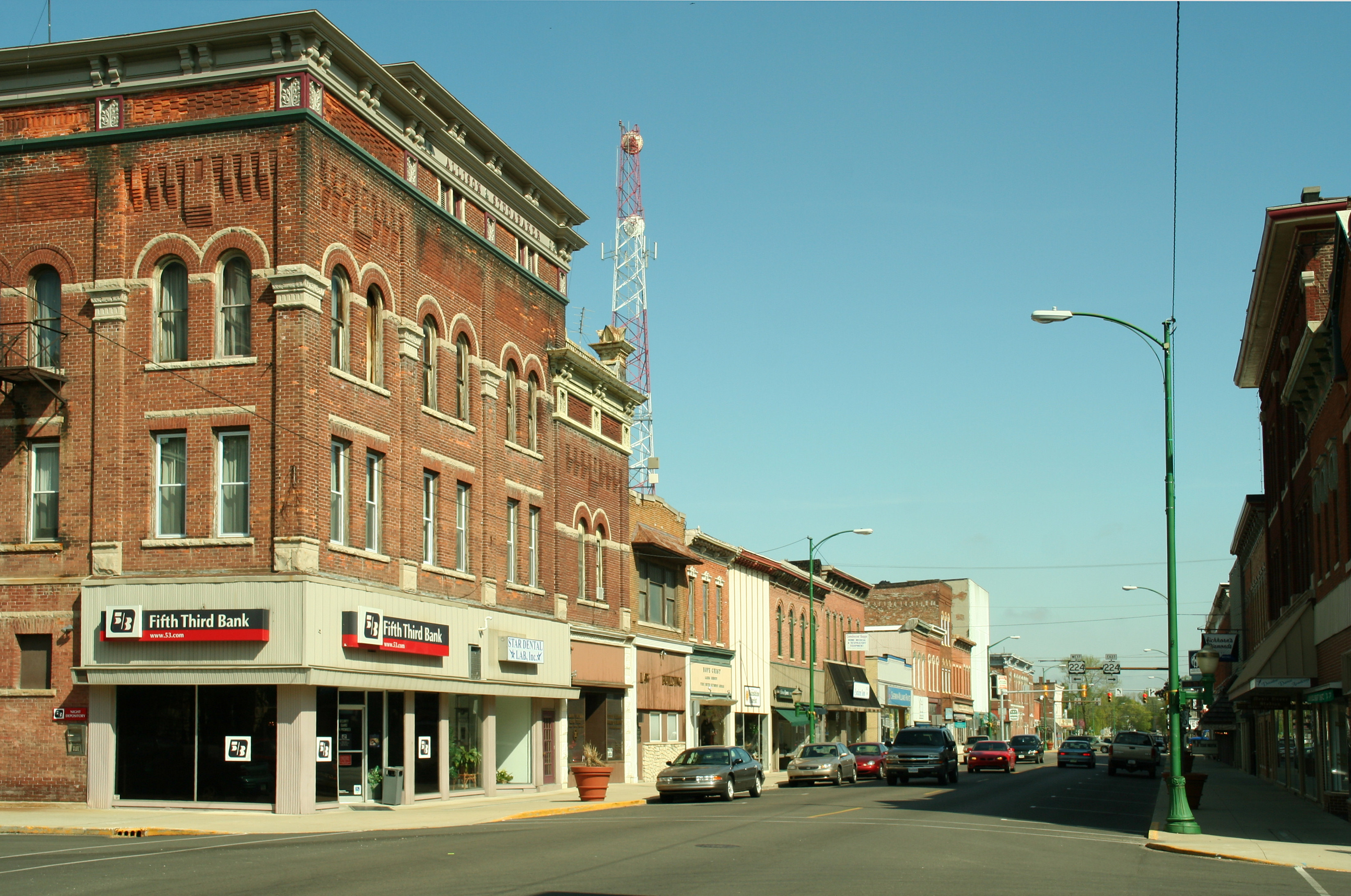
- Decatur downtown in 2006.

- Flag Logo

- Location of Decatur in Adams County
- Coordinates: 40°49′43″N 84°55′40″W
- Country: United States
- State: Indiana
- County: Adams
- Townships: Root, Washington
- Founded: 1836
- Incorporated: 1853
- Named after: Stephen Decatur

Government
  - Type: Mayor-council government
  - Mayor: Dan Rickord (D)

Area
  - Total: 6.10 sq mi (15.81 km^{2})
  - Land: 6.10 sq mi (15.80 km^{2})
  - Water: 0.0077 sq mi (0.02 km^{2})
- Elevation: 801 ft (244 m)

Population (2020)
  - Total: 9,913
  - Density: 1,625/sq mi (627.5/km^{2})
- Time zone: UTC-5 (EST)
  - Summer (DST): UTC-4 (EDT)
- ZIP code: 46733
- Area code: 260
- FIPS code: 18-17074
- GNIS feature ID: 2394480
- Website: www.cityofdecatur.in.gov

Historical population
Census	Pop.	Note	%±
1850	231		—
1860	532		130.3%
1870	858		61.3%
1880	1,905		122.0%
1890	3,142		64.9%
1900	4,148		32.0%
1910	4,471		7.8%
1920	4,762		6.5%
1930	5,156		8.3%
1940	5,861		13.7%
1950	7,271		24.1%
1960	8,327		14.5%
1970	8,445		1.4%
1980	8,649		2.4%
1990	8,644		−0.1%
2000	9,528		10.2%
2010	9,405		−1.3%
2020	9,913		5.4%
US Decennial Census

Decatur is a city in Root and Washington townships, Adams County, Indiana, United States. It is the county seat (and the largest community) of Adams County. Decatur is home to Adams Memorial Hospital, which was designated as one of the "Top 100" Critical Access Hospitals in the United States. The population of Decatur was 9,913 at the 2020 census, up from 9,405 at the 2010 census.

== History ==
=== Founding ===
The first non-Native American settlers arrived in what is now Decatur in 1835. They arrived as a result of the end of the Black Hawk War as well as the completion of the Erie Canal. They consisted entirely of settlers from New England. These were "Yankee" settlers, that is to say they were descended from the English Puritans who settled New England in the colonial era. They were primarily members of the Congregational Church though due to the Second Great Awakening many of them had converted to Methodism and some had become Baptists before coming to what is now Decatur. The Congregational Church subsequently has gone through many divisions and some factions are now known as the Church of Christ and Church of God. When the New England settlers arrived in what is now Decatur there was nothing but a dense virgin forest and wild prairie.

Decatur was founded by Samuel Rugg in 1836. It was named for Stephen Decatur Jr., one of the captains of the original six frigates of the US navy. A post office was established in Decatur in 1837. Decatur was incorporated in 1853.

=== Post-Civil War history ===
After the Civil War, Decatur was known as a sundown town, where African Americans were discriminated against and eventually run out of the town completely in 1902. In a New York Times article published on July 14, 1902, the headline read, "Negro Driven Away," and it recounted the story of the violent mob attacks which drove away African Americans from Decatur during the summer of 1902. The last line from the article explicitly concluded, "The anti-negroites declare that as Decatur is now cleared of Negroes they will keep it so, and the importation of any more will undoubtedly result in serious trouble." A month before the last Black person was reportedly forced out of Decatur, the Indianapolis Freeman reported that 50 men began driving the Black people out because they "were determined that colored people should not live in the town." Eventually African Americans began slowly settling in town; however, due to the sundown policies that persisted throughout much of the 1900s, the current demographics still indicate a low percentage of Black residents.

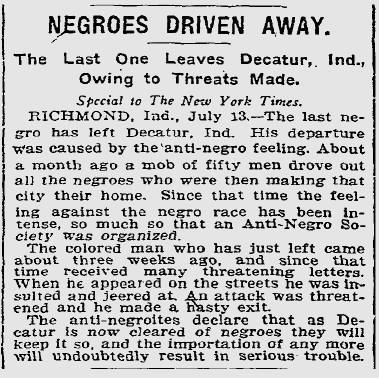
New York Times article detailing the last Black man to be forcefully driven out of Decatur, Indiana.

== Geography ==
According to the 2010 United States census, Decatur has a total area of 5.786 square miles (14.99 km^{2}), of which 5.78 square miles (14.97 km^{2}) (or 99.9%) is land and 0.006 square miles (0.02 km^{2}) (or 0.1%) is water.

== Demographics ==
=== 2020 census ===
As of the 2020 census, Decatur had a population of 9,913. The population density was 1,713.2 inhabitants per square mile (661.5/km^{2}). The median age was 40.9 years. 21.8% of residents were under the age of 18 and 20.8% were 65 years of age or older. For every 100 females, there were 89.8 males, and for every 100 females age 18 and over, there were 87.4 males age 18 and over.

99.8% of residents lived in urban areas, while 0.2% lived in rural areas.

There were 4,291 households in Decatur, of which 26.5% had children under the age of 18 living in them. Of all households, 40.6% were married-couple households, 19.4% were households with a male householder and no spouse or partner present, and 32.3% were households with a female householder and no spouse or partner present. About 34.9% of all households were made up of individuals, and 16.2% had someone living alone who was 65 years of age or older.

There were 4,572 housing units, of which 6.1% were vacant. The homeowner vacancy rate was 1.6%, and the rental vacancy rate was 5.8%.

Racial composition as of the 2020 census
Race	Number	Percent
White	8,876	89.5%
Black or African American	144	1.5%
American Indian and Alaska Native	44	0.4%
Asian	57	0.6%
Native Hawaiian and Other Pacific Islander	3	0.0%
Some other race	260	2.6%
Two or more races	529	5.3%
Hispanic or Latino (of any race)	864	8.7%

=== Demographic estimates ===
96.1% of residents spoke English and 3.4% spoke Spanish at home. All residents of Decatur were citizens. The ancestry of residents was 33.3% German, 7.1% English, and 6.9% Irish.

6.8% of residents were veterans, 15.8% had a visible or non-visible disability, and an estimated 4.6% were uninsured.

The average household size was 2.24. The homeownership rate was 64.3%, and 12.5% of housing units were renter-occupied.

43.9% of residents had a high school diploma or equivalent, and 12.9% had a bachelor's degree or higher. The majority of residents worked in manufacturing (37.4%), education, social services and health care (14.2%), and retail (13.6%).

Only 76.3% of residents had broadband internet access, in contrast to 80.1% of state residents.

=== Income and poverty ===
The median income for a household in the city was $45,149, and the median income for a family was $58,542. The per capita income for the city was $23,059. About 13.9% of the population was below the poverty line. This included 15.4% of those under age 18 and 5.2% of those age 65 or over.

== Government ==
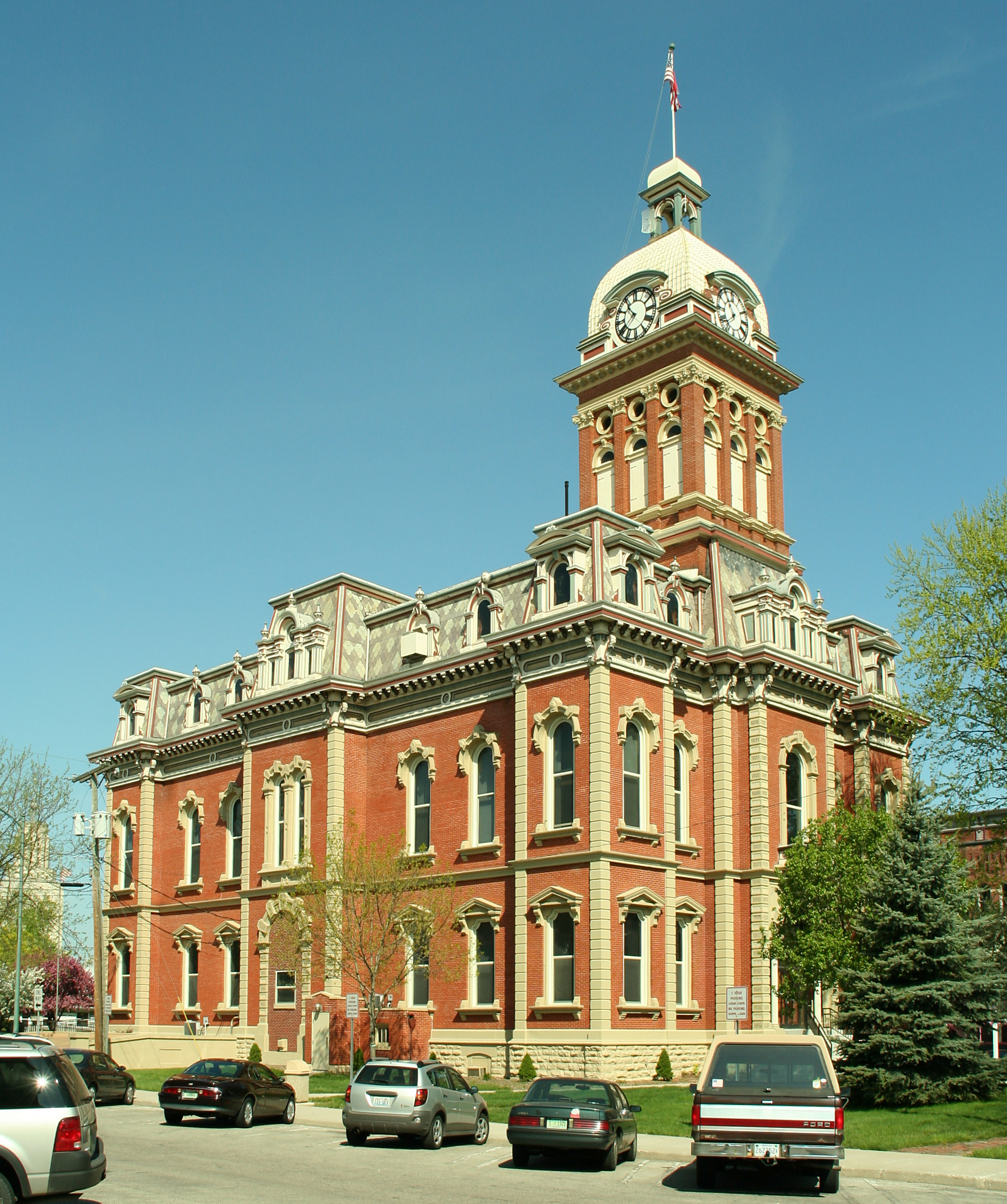
Adams County courthouse, Decatur, Indiana, 2006

The government consists of a mayor and a city council. The mayor is elected in citywide vote. The city council consists of five members. Four are elected from individual districts. One is elected at-large. A clerk-treasurer is also elected in citywide vote.

== Education ==
The local high school in Decatur is Bellmont High School; approximately 700 students attend BHS. Local elementary and middle school students attend Bellmont Elementary School and Bellmont Middle School. St. Joseph Catholic School serves students in grades K-8. Zion Lutheran School, Wyneken Memorial Lutheran School, and St. Peter-Immanuel Lutheran School also serve students in grades PK-8.

Decatur has a public library, a branch of the Adams Public Library System.

== Media ==
Decatur is home to one newspaper, The Decatur Daily Democrat, which was founded in 1857. Local Bellmont High School also operates a 24/7, student-run radio station, 103.5 Brave Nation.

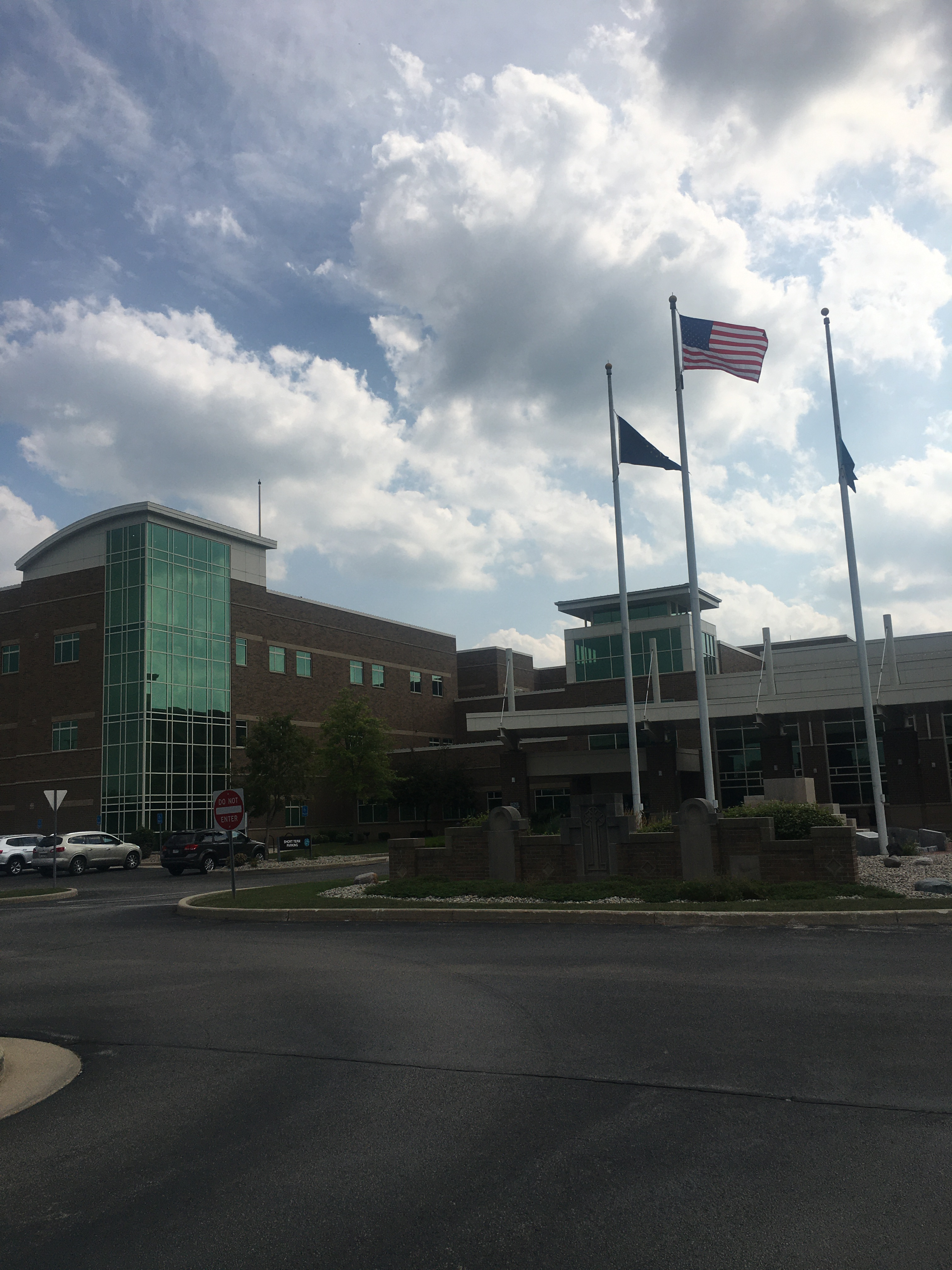
Adams Memorial Hospital

== Healthcare ==
Decatur is home to the Adams Memorial Hospital which was designated as one of the "Top 100" Critical Access Hospitals in the United States. The hospital was established on June 30, 1923, during election day in Adams County After voters were posed with a question of constructing a county hospital.

== Architecture ==
Much of downtown Decatur consists of historic brick and mortar buildings. The courthouse, designed by architect J.C. Johnson, takes French inspiration in the Second Empire style and is mainly composed of red brick. Finished in 1873, it is especially long-standing, for over 150 years. In 1900, a structural update to the clock tower atop the building was issued due to weight instability. Decatur is also known for its modern architecture, with over 18 sculptures throughout its downtown area.

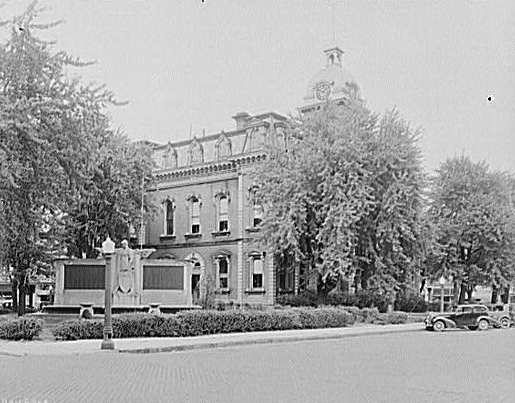
Adams County courthouse, Decatur, Indiana, 1935

== Notable people ==
- David Anspaugh, television and film director, Hoosiers, Rudy
- John Fetzer, former owner of Detroit Tigers
- Bob Hite Sr., radio and television announcer for CBS
- Olive D. Pierson, Connecticut state representative
- David Smith, Sculptor

== See also ==
- Indiana Register of Historic Sites and Structures
- List of sundown towns in the United States
- National Register of Historic Places listings in Adams County, Indiana
- Peace Monument
