= Elwyn Seelye =

Elwyn Seelye (October 27, 1848 – October 14, 1920) was the founder of the New York State Historical Association and the first custodian of the Lake George battlefield site.

== Early years ==
Elwyn Seelye was born October 27, 1848, in Queensbury, Warren County, New York. His family was from New England and was prominent in the Indian wars of the New England Colonies. His great-grandfather, Nehemiah Seelye, was one of the patentees of Queensbury, and an officer in the French and Indian War and the American Revolutionary War. Reuben Seelye, grandfather of Elwyn, was a lumberman, who cleared many farms, among which are some of the best known in Queensbury. Reuben Seelye, 2nd, holder of many local offices, was the father of Elwyn Seelye; Rizpah Matilda, daughter of Calvin Haskins, a physician who practiced in Queensbury, was his mother. Her maternal grandfather, Fields. was an officer at the Battle of Lexington.

In 1864, before Seelye had reached his 16 birthday, he attempted to enlist as a Union soldier. After repeated rejection by officers who knew his father and his age, he went to Fort Ann and secured acceptance. He ran away from home to Albany and entered the 14th New York Heavy Artillery. His regiment reached the front just after the fall of Petersburg. While on duty in North Carolina, he was thrown from the top of a freight car and received an injury of the spine from which he never fully recovered.

== Career ==
He returned from the war to his father's Queensbury farm on the Bay Road, which he managed until some three years after his marriage. At a later period, he took building contracts at Lake George and dealt in real estate.

In 1877, Seelye married Elizabeth, eldest daughter of Edward Eggleston, the author. They lived at Dunham's Bay from 1881 to 1895 throughout the year and passed the winters of 1895–98 in the village of Caldwell. During that time, Seelye became deeply interested in the marking and preservation of the site of the Battle of Lake George. After the purchase of the battle ground by the State, he became its first custodian. Ill health at last compelled his resignation.

As a charter member of the New York State Historical Association, he was one of its stanchest supporters. The “Report of Secretary” in Volume I of the annuals of the New York State Historical Association opens with the following statement: “It may not be uninteresting to review in a few words the origin of this organization. In the summer of 1898, Seelye called a few gentlemen together at the Fort William Henry Hotel to consider the formation of an historical society. The project was well received, other meetings were held, the scope of the movement enlarged, and a State society determined upon.”

== Personal life ==
In the fall of 1898, Seelye began to reside in Ithaca during term time to secure the advantages of a university town for his children. He was a member of the Town and Gown Club and was one of a congenial coterie self-named the “Daddy’s Club". He continued to reside in Ithaca during term time until June 1909, when he returned to Dunham's Bay. After 1910, he spent his winters at New York and elsewhere and his summers at Dunham's Bay.

Seelye died at Hastings-on-Hudson, October 14, 1920. He was the father of six children: Allegra (b. 1878), Blanche (b. 1882), Elwyn (b. 1884), Edward (b. 1888), Cynthia (b. 1888) and Elizabeth (b. 1893). His wife and four of them survived him.
