= Adirondack Balloon Festival =

Hot air balloon festival in New York, US

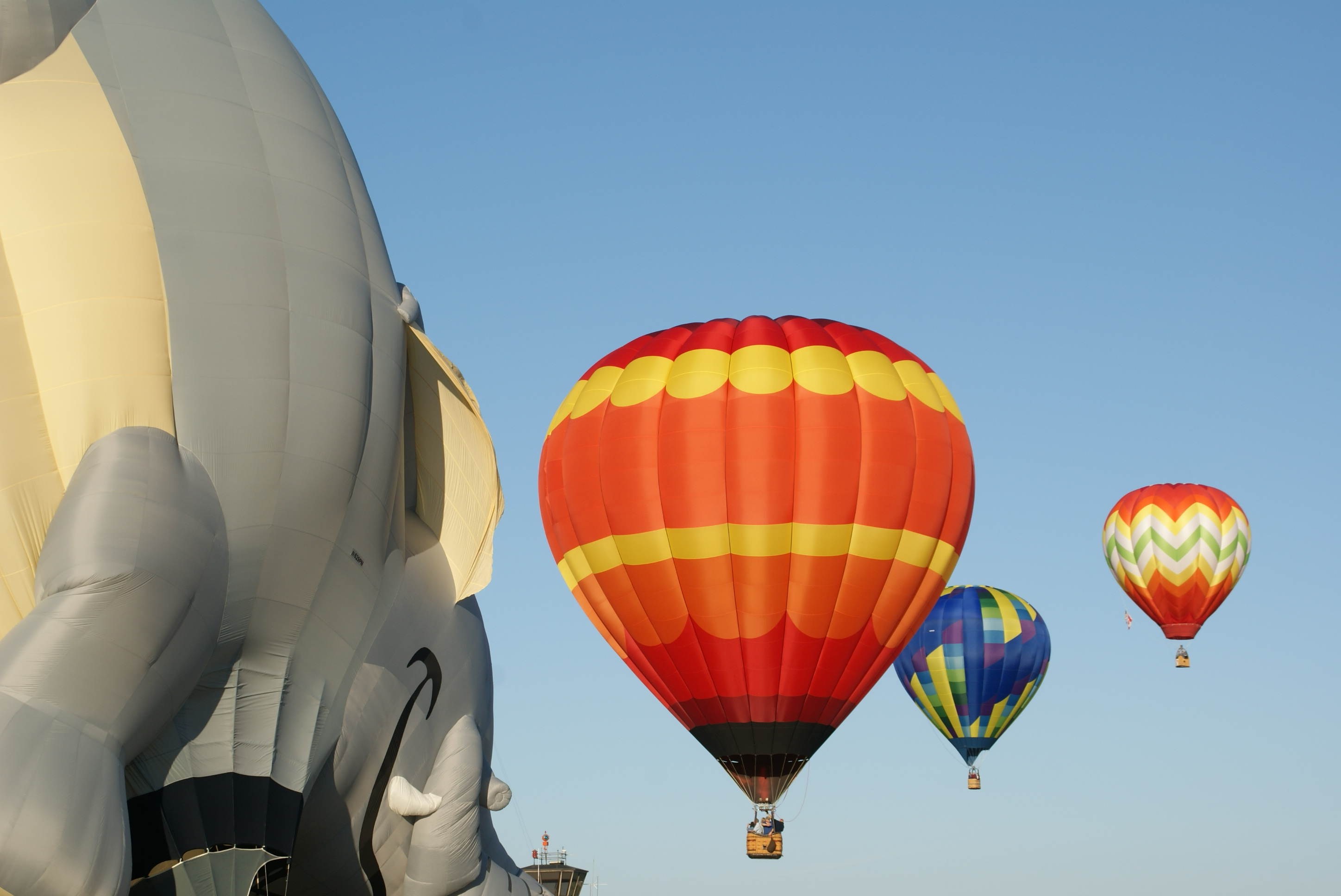
- Photo of the Festival taken during September 2014
- Genre: Hot air balloon festival
- Dates: September
- Locations: 443 Queensbury Road, Queensbury, New York, United States
- Country: United States
- Years active: 1973-present
- Founder: Walter Grishkot
- Website: www.adirondackballoonfest.org

The Adirondack Balloon Festival is an annually held hot-air balloon festival that takes place in Queensbury, New York during mid-to-late September, roughly two to three weeks following Labor Day.

== Background ==
The festival is a four-day event that has been hosted every year since 1973 (with the sole exception of 2020, when the event was cancelled due to COVID-19) and has, particularly in recent years, consistently attracted well over 100,000 people from across the world over the course of its four-day timespan, mainly from surrounding areas such as Lake George, Plattsburgh, Saratoga Springs, and Québec province in neighboring Canada.

Pilots, primarily professional and amateur balloonists from multiple regions, were also brought to Queensbury to participate in the event, with close to 100 balloons being able to launch simultaneously provided the conditions allow for it.

It was originally an event that was hosted at SUNY Adirondack, a community college in the area, however as the event gradually grew in scale and attendance over the years, the entire venue was relocated to Floyd-Bennett Memorial Airport, located just outside of the city of Glens Falls, New York. The event continues to be held there today, despite the passing of both the festival's founder, the balloonist Walter Grishkot, as well as his wife, Joan, both of whom were considered to be pivotal to the event. Its 50th-anniversary festival was held in September 2023.

The festival itself is entirely not-for-profit, admission is free, and the event is open to all members of the public. Funding for the annual venue is raised entirely by the public and volunteers from within the community. Peak flight times, according to the website, are 5 to 9 a.m. and 3 to 8 p.m. during each day of the event.
