= Floyd Bennett Memorial Airport =

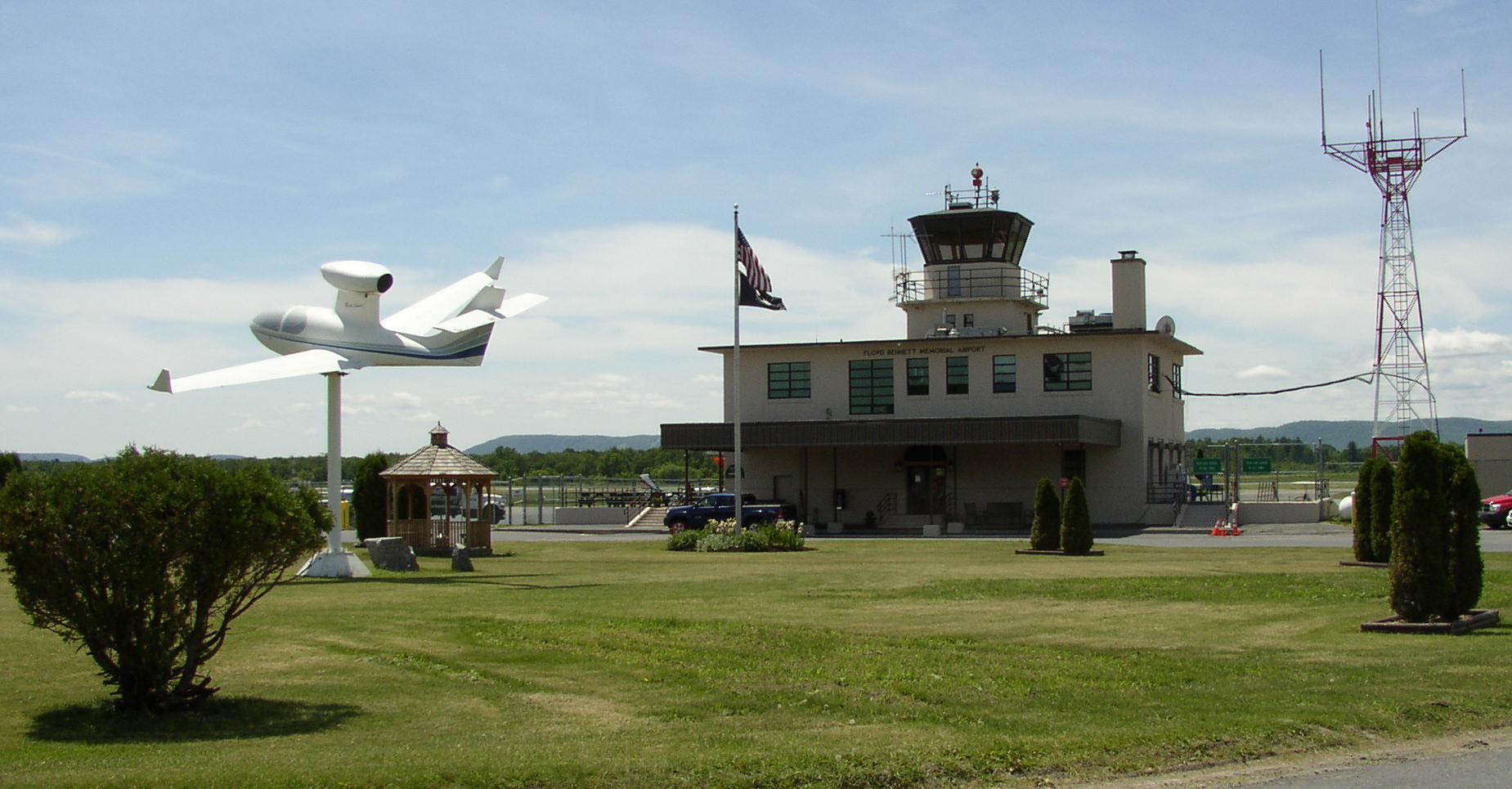

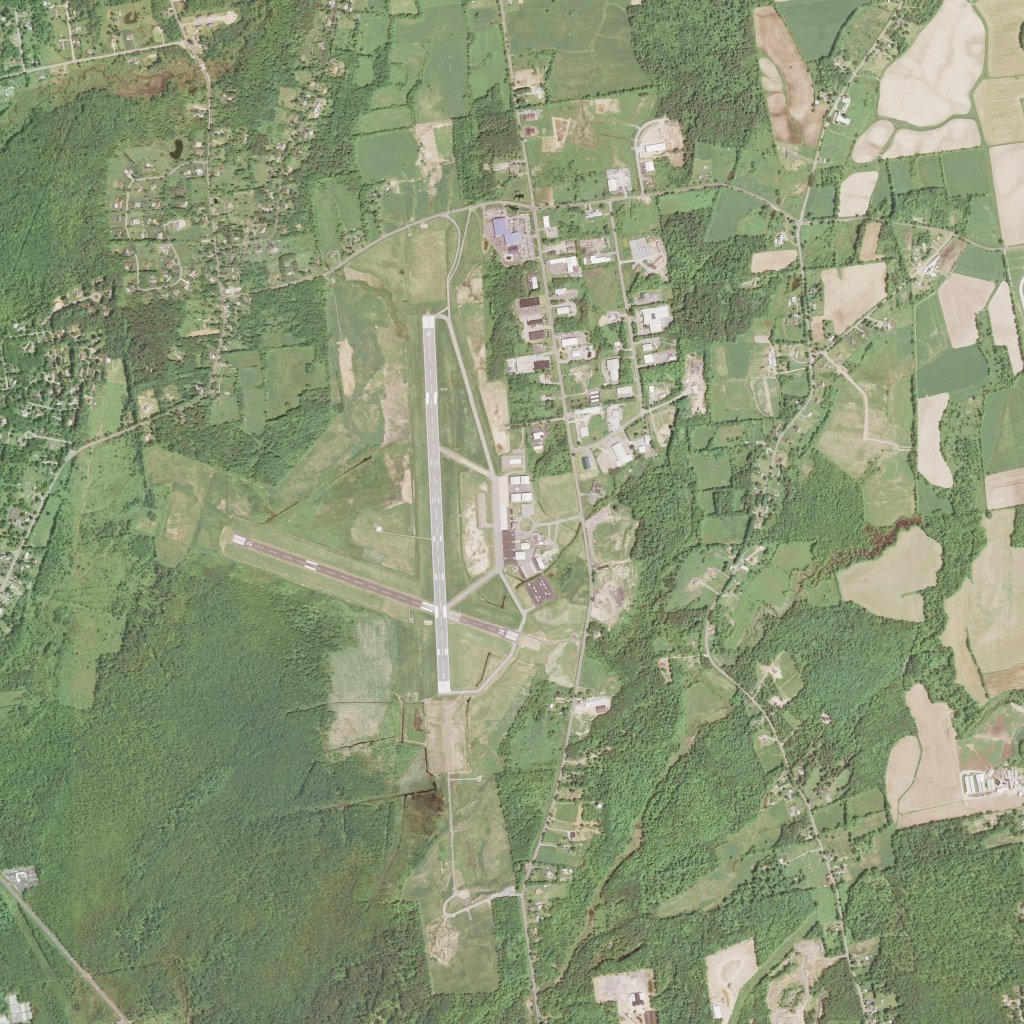
- USGS orthophoto
- IATA: GFL; ICAO: KGFL; FAA LID: GFL

Summary
- Airport type: Public
- Owner: Warren County
- Serves: Glens Falls, New York
- Location: Queensbury, New York
- Elevation AMSL: 328 ft (100 m)
- Coordinates: 43°20′28″N 073°36′37″W

Maps
- Location of airport in New York GFL (the United States)
- Interactive map of Floyd Bennett Memorial Airport

Runways
Direction	Length		Surface
Direction	ft	m	Surface
1/19	5,000	1,524	Asphalt
12/30	3,999	1,219	Asphalt

Statistics (2011)
- Aircraft operations: 33,015
- Based aircraft: 50
- Source: Federal Aviation Administration

Floyd Bennett Memorial Airport (IATA: GFL, ICAO: KGFL, FAA LID: GFL) is a county-owned, public-use airport in Warren County, New York, United States. It is located three nautical miles (6 km) northeast of the central business district of Glens Falls, in the town of Queensbury. This airport is included in the National Plan of Integrated Airport Systems for 2011–2015, which categorized it as a general aviation facility.

The airport is named in honor of Floyd Bennett. It was formerly known as Warren County Airport.

The annual Adirondack Balloon Festival is held at this airport.

== History ==
From 1918 to 1946, the county's only airport, Floyd Bennett Field, was located on what are now the grounds of Queensbury High School. In 1941, ground was broken a few miles east at what is now the current site of the airport. The airport has been served commercially by Colonial Airlines (1940s), Eastern Air Lines (1950s), Mohawk Airlines (1950s–1970s), Allegheny Airlines (1970s), and Air North (1960s–1980s).

== Facilities and aircraft ==
Floyd Bennett Memorial Airport covers an area of 628 acres (254 ha) at an elevation of 328 feet (100 m) above mean sea level. It has two runways with asphalt surfaces: 1/19 is 5,000 by 150 feet (1,524 x 46 m) and 12/30 is 3,999 by 100 feet (1,219 x 30 m).

The north-facing runway 1 is equipped with an instrument landing system and a medium intensity approach lighting system with runway alignment lights. GPS-based instrument approaches are available to all four runway ends. A VORTAC is located at the field and during the 1990s and earlier was used as the basis for IFR approaches to the main runway.

For the 12-month period ending December 31, 2011, the airport had 33,015 aircraft operations, an average of 90 per day: 85% general aviation, 12% air taxi, and 3% military. At that time there were 50 aircraft based at this airport: 92% single-engine, 4% jet, 2% multi-engine, and 2% helicopter.

== Incidents ==
On November 19, 1969, Mohawk Airlines Flight 411 crashed into Pilot Knob Mountain while attempting to land at the conclusion of a flight from Albany. All 14 passengers and crew were killed in the accident.

On June 21, 1983, a Beechcraft BE-58 landed without deploying the landing gear after a training flight around the airport. The accident was blamed on the pilot's failure to deploy the landing gear. No injuries were reported, however, the plane was destroyed.

On June 30, 1984, an Aeronca 11AC collided with a rock ledge approximately 1/4 of a mile north of runway 19 during takeoff. The pilot of the aircraft was killed in the incident.

On September 27, 2002, a charter jet operated by Heartland Aviation Inc. suffered a landing gear failure during a hard landing on runway 1. The hard landing was attributed to the pilot's efforts to avoid deer that had wandered onto the runway. There were no injuries or fatalities.

On May 15, 2010, a 1999 American Champion crashed on takeoff from runway 19. The crash was blamed on a large wind gust, which caused the pilot to lose control of the plane and crash into a ditch. No injures or fatalities resulted from the crash.

On July 2, 2011, a Piper Cherokee lost electrical power while on final approach into the airfield. As a result, the pilot was unable to deploy the plane's landing gear. The pilot was uninjured.

On July 16, 2012, a single engine Cessna 208 was landing on runway 19 when it blew a tire, causing the plane to flip multiple times. The pilot suffered a hand laceration and the plane was destroyed.

On November 19, 2021, a Piper PA-28 Cherokee lost power after departing from runway 30. The pilot attempted to turn back and make an emergency landing on runway 19, but crashed into a fence just short of the runway at the north gate of the airport. The pilot was uninjured in the crash, however, his passenger was transported to a local hospital for treatment of minor injuries.

== See also ==
- List of airports in New York
