= Kattskill Bay, New York =

Kattskill Bay
- hamlet
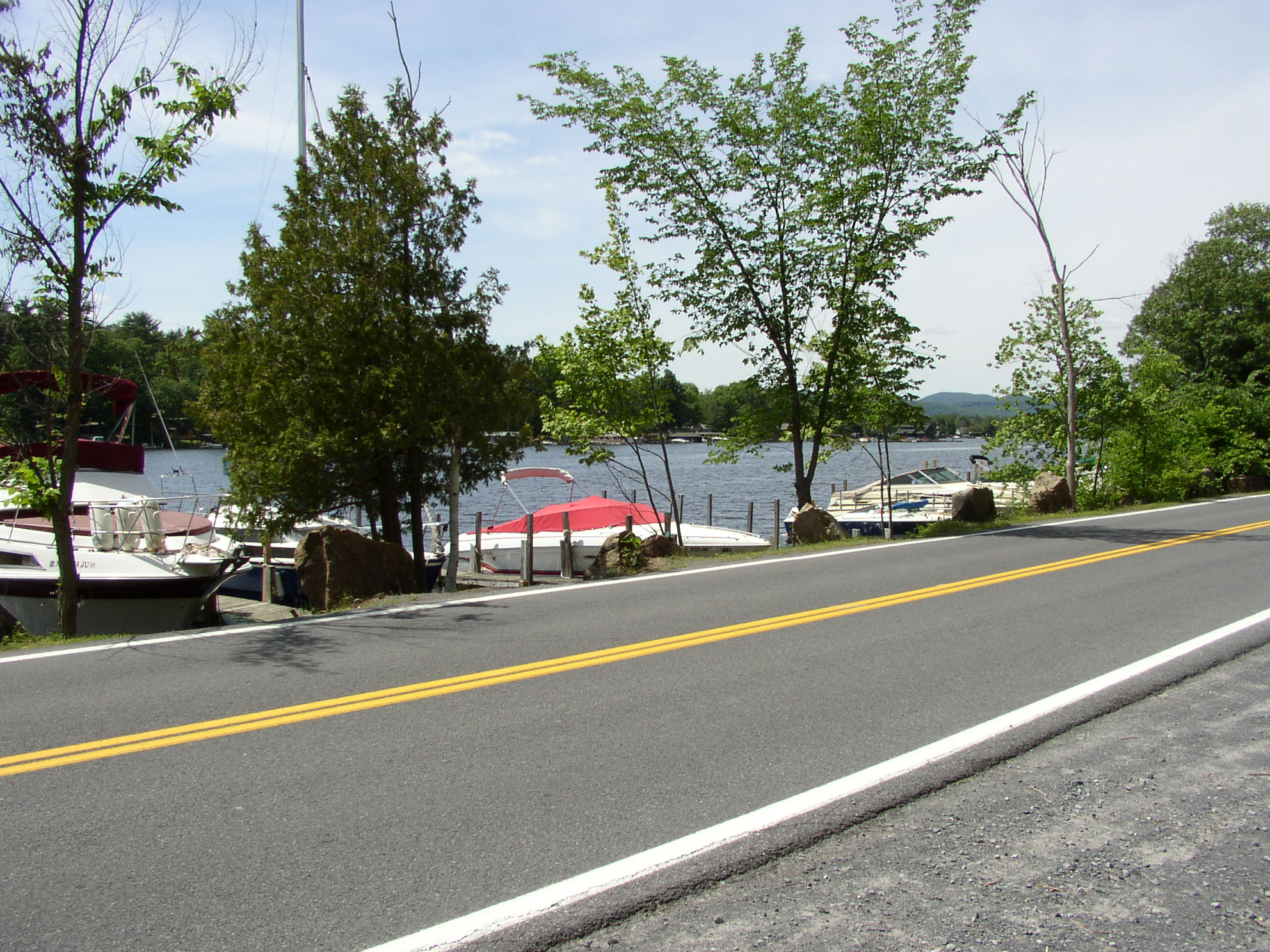
- View of Warner Bay from Pilot Knob Road in Kattskill Bay

- Location within New York
- Coordinates: 43°28′43″N 73°37′42″W
- Country: United States
- State: New York
- Counties: Warren & Washington
- Time zone: UTC-5 (EST)
  - Summer (DST): UTC-4 (EDT)
- ZIP code: 12844
- Area code: 518

Kattskill Bay is a hamlet in the towns of Queensbury in Warren County and Fort Ann in Washington County in the state of New York, United States. The hamlet is located along the shore of Warner and Van Warmer Bays of Lake George. Kattskill Bay was part of the proposed East Lake George village. Pilot Knob Road is the major highway that runs through the hamlet. The hamlet is located at the base of Buck Mountain.

Kattskill Bay is also the name assigned by the United States Postal Service to ZIP code 12844. Pilot Knob is also an acceptable name.
