= Hadlock =

Hadlock can refer to

- Hadlock, Virginia, an unincorporated community
- Hadlock Pond, a man-made reservoir in the state of New York
- Hadlock Field, a minor league baseball field in Portland, Maine
- Charles Robert Hadlock (born 1947), American applied mathematician
- Ryan Hadlock (born 1978), an American record producer

== See also ==
- Port Hadlock-Irondale, Washington, a census-designated place
