= Adam Terry =

American football player (born 1982)

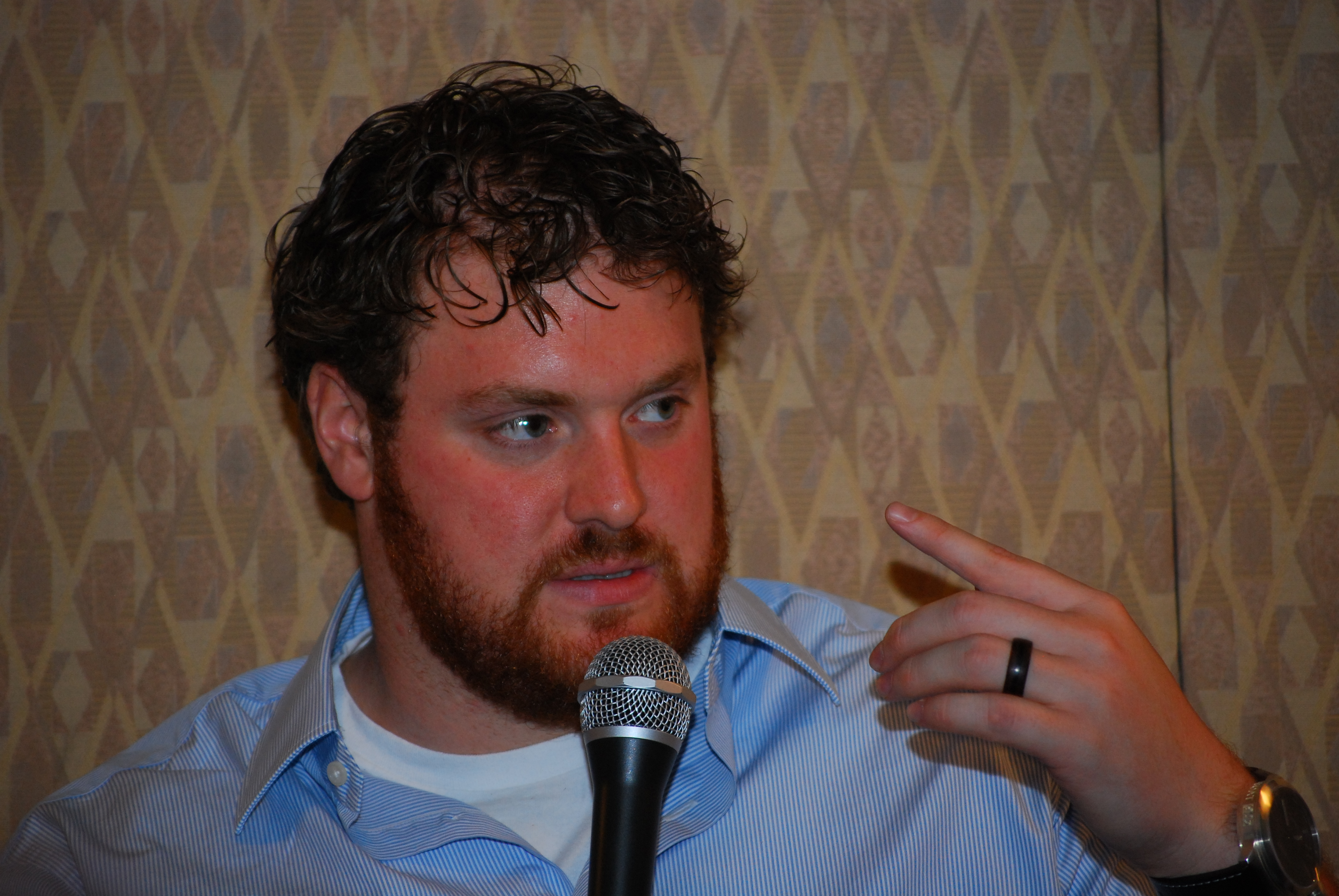
- Terry in 2009

No. 78, 79
- Position: Offensive tackle

Personal information
- Born: September 1, 1982 (age 44); Queensbury, New York, U.S.
- Listed height: 6 ft 8 in (2.03 m)
- Listed weight: 335 lb (152 kg)

Career information
- High school: Queensbury
- College: Syracuse
- NFL draft: 2005: 2nd round, 64th overall pick

Career history
- Baltimore Ravens (2005–2009); Indianapolis Colts (2010)*; San Diego Chargers (2010); Jacksonville Jaguars (2010); Tennessee Titans (2011)*
- * Offseason or practice squad member only

Career NFL statistics
- Games played: 50
- Games started: 18
- Stats at Pro Football Reference

Adam S. Terry (born September 1, 1982) is an American former professional football player who was an offensive tackle in the National Football League (NFL). He played college football for the Syracuse Orange and was selected by the Baltimore Ravens in the second round of the 2005 NFL draft.

He was also a member of the Indianapolis Colts, San Diego Chargers, Jacksonville Jaguars and Tennessee Titans.

== Early life ==
Terry attended Queensbury High School in Queensbury, New York. As a junior, he was a first-team All-Conference pick and a first-team All-State selection, and was named an All-East selection by Prep Football Report.

== College career ==
Terry played college football at Syracuse University, where he started in the final 35 games of his career there. He earned a degree in history.

== Professional career ==
=== Baltimore Ravens ===
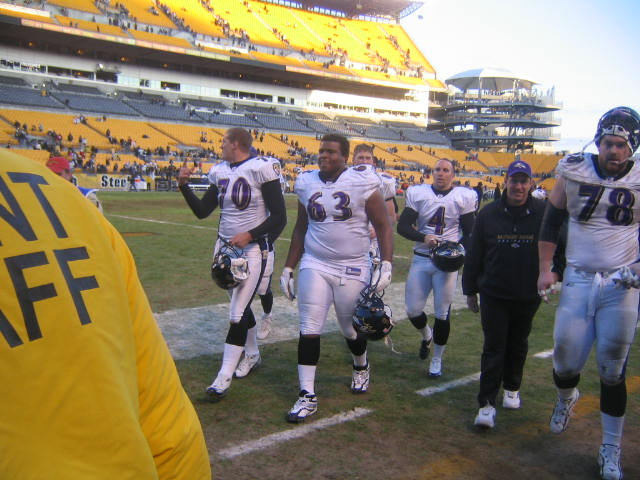
Terry (78) with the Ravens in 2006.

Terry was selected by the Baltimore Ravens in the second round (64th overall) in the 2005 NFL draft. In his rookie season, he played in seven games. In the 2006 season he played in all 16 regular season games and was part of an offensive line that only allowed 17 sacks, a franchise record. Furthermore, that season the Ravens rushed for 1,637 yards and 11 touchdowns. However, Terry continued to struggle with injuries, which led to his departure.

=== Indianapolis Colts ===
Terry signed with the Indianapolis Colts on March 12, 2010. Terry was cut by Colts following Training Camp.

=== San Diego Chargers ===
Signed on September 5, 2010, following his release from the Colts, Terry spent two games in San Diego before being released to make room for receiver Kelley Washington on November 4.

=== Tennessee Titans ===
On August 15, 2011, he signed with the Tennessee Titans, but he was released by the team on September 3, 2011.
