= West Mountain (ski area) =

Ski area in New York, United States

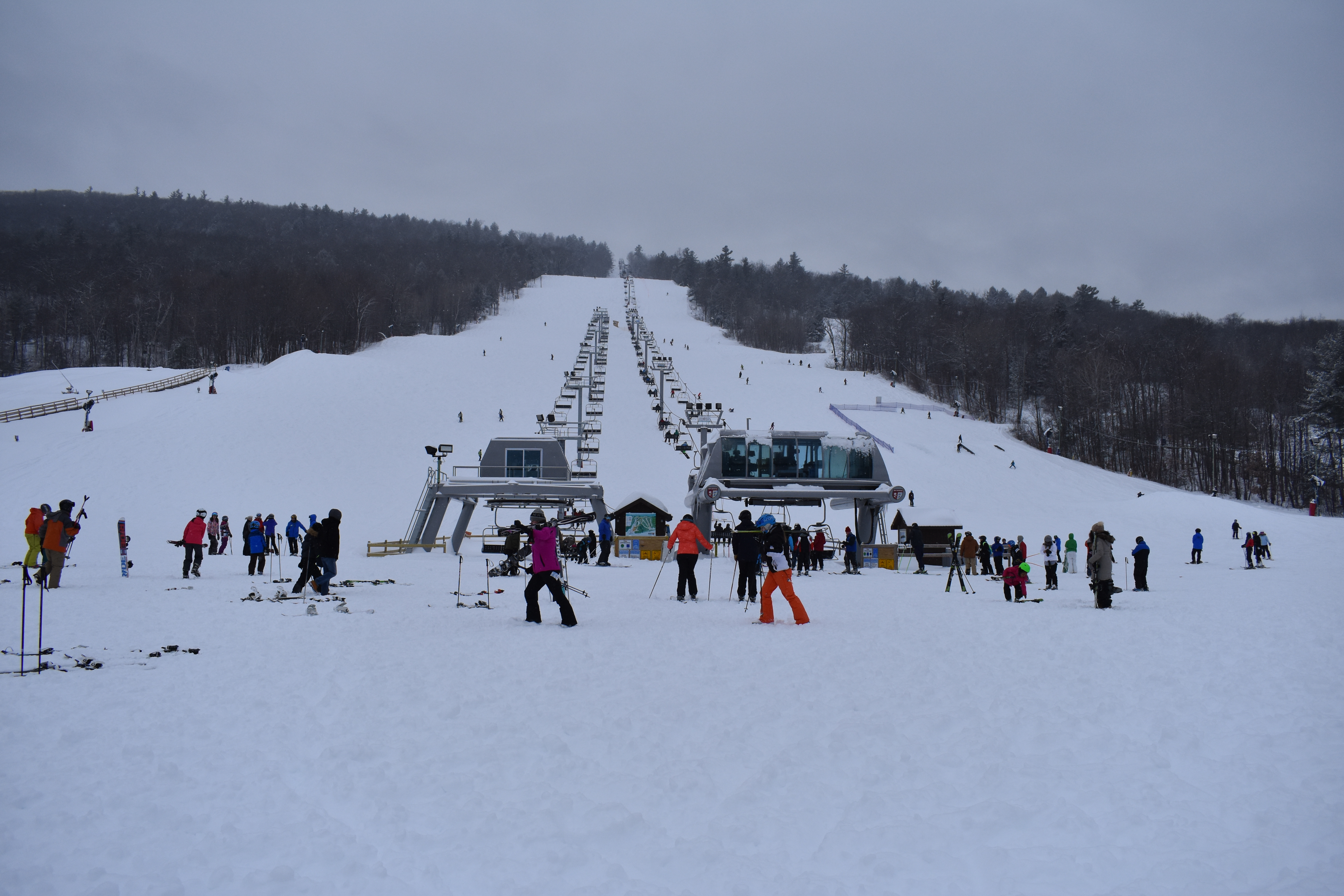
- The Face of West Mountain Ski Area in Queensbury, NY.
- Interactive map of West Mountain
- Location: 59 West Mountain Rd. Queensbury, NY
- Nearest city: Glens Falls, New York
- Coordinates: 43°17′8″N 73°43′42″W
- Status: Operating
- Vertical: 1,010 ft (310 m)
- Top elevation: 1,470 ft (450 m)
- Base elevation: 460 ft (140 m)
- Skiable area: 130 acres (53 ha)
- Trails: 35 (30 Groomed/5 Ungroomed Glades)
- Longest run: 1.4 m (4 ft 7 in)
- Lift system: 5 total- 1 Quad Chairlift, 2 Triple Chairlifts, 2 magic carpets
- Lift capacity: 3,000 / hour
- Terrain parks: 2
- Snowmaking: 100%
- Night skiing: Yes
- Website: West Mountain Ski Area

West Mountain is a ski area located in Queensbury, New York, just outside the Adirondack Park on West Mountain Road (CR58). In the summer and fall, West Mountain offers Aerial Tree Top Adventure Tours, Mountain Biking (downhill and cross-country), scenic chairlift rides and hikes, full-service dining (limited hours) with dinner and date night packages and available for wedding and special event bookings. In the winter, West Mountain contains 30 ski trails ranging in difficulty from easy green trails to more advanced black diamond trails and some glades. There is also a tubing park near the Main Lodge, containing six 700-foot chutes and four 1000-foot chutes. West Mountain has 100% snowmaking and has replaced all its old chairlifts with newer quad and triple chairlifts. The main lodge contains a cafe on the first floor and a full-service restaurant and bar on the second floor called the "West Mountain Bar & Eatery". West Mountain and the surrounding area is located within the Adirondack Mountains.

== Resort Facilities ==
=== Statistics ===
- **Base:** 460 ft (140 m)
- **Summit:** 1,470 ft (450 m)
- **Vertical drop:** 1,010 ft (310 m)
- **Skiable area:** 130 acres (53 ha)

=== Lodges and Dining ===
West Mountain features two distinct base areas, each equipped with its own dedicated parking facilities and base lodge to manage visitor flow and operations:

- Main Base Lodge: Located at the primary face of the mountain. It serves as the main hub for ticketing, rentals, and snow tubing. The second floor features the full-service restaurant and bar, the **West Mountain Bar & Eatery**.
- Northwest Lodge: Located at the Northwest base of the resort, servicing the Apex chairlift. This area serves as a primary hub for specialized training, alpine racers, and the West Mountain Racing (WMR) Academy programs.

=== Trails ===
West Mountain features 35 named trails. The terrain layout accommodates all skill levels, with approximately 25% designated as beginner, 45% as intermediate, and 30% as advanced runs. The trail network consists of 30 regularly groomed trails and 5 un-groomed glades for tree skiing.

=== Lifts ===
West Mountain operates a total of 5 primary ski lifts to service its alpine terrain, featuring a combined capacity of 5,300 passengers per hour. The lift system has been modernized with fixed-grip chairlifts primarily installed by manufacturers Poma and Partek:

- The West Express (2015): A 3-person Poma fixed-grip chairlift spanning 1,150 meters with a capacity of 1,500 passengers per hour. The lift's Poma Alpha drive terminal and equipment were relocated from Haystack Mountain in Vermont.
- Northwest Chair (2016): A 3-person Poma chairlift spanning 1,060 meters with a capacity of 1,500 passengers per hour, servicing the Northwest base and Apex terrain.
- Face Chair (2018): A 4-person Partek quad chairlift spanning 396 meters with a capacity of 1,800 passengers per hour, located on the primary face.
- Apex (2019): A 3-person Partek chairlift servicing the Northwest side and the summer scenic/aerial treetop adventure park.
- Rope Tow (West Mountain): A low-rope baby lift spanning 100 meters with a capacity of 500 passengers per hour, primarily servicing the learning area or terrain park.

Additionally, the resort utilizes surface lifts (magic carpets) for its beginner learning area and operates two dedicated tubing lifts for its snow tubing park. During the summer and fall seasons, the Apex triple chairlift is operated for scenic rides and hiking access to its 5-acre Aerial Treetop Adventure Park.

== West Mountain Racing ==
Founded in 2012, West Mountain Racing (WMR) is a private alpine ski racing club and race event management company operating year-round out of West Mountain Ski Resort.

The program provides alpine race training, technical support, and off-season conditioning programs for athletes ranging from youth levels (U8) through FIS and post-graduate competitors.

=== Coaching Staff ===
According to the official West Mountain Racing staff directory for the 2026–2027 season, the program's coaching and leadership staff includes:

- Thomas Vonn – WMR Alpine Technical Director and Head Men's FIS Coach.
- Louis Farone – Alpine Race Director and U16–U18 Juniors Head Coach.
- Christian Chedel – FIS Assistant Coach, West Mountain House Manager, and Athletic Development Advisor.
- Sara Montgomery – Program Director for West Mountain Racing and General Manager of West Mountain.

Steve Lathrop served as Alpine Race Director for West Mountain Racing until 2026.

=== Competition and participation ===
WMR athletes participate in alpine ski racing competitions sanctioned by New York State Ski Racing Association (NYSSRA), U.S. Ski & Snowboard, and FIS in the United States and Canada.
