= Queensbury Union Free School District =

School district in the U.S. state of New York

Location
- 429 Aviation Road, Queensbury, New York 12804 United States
- Coordinates: 43°20′3″N 73°41′17″W

District information
- Established: 1950
- Superintendent: Kyle Gannon
- Schools: 4
- Budget: $54,537,000 (2014)
- NCES District ID: 3624030

Students and staff
- Students: 3300
- Teachers: 258
- Staff: 493

Other information
- Website: https://www.queensburyschool.org/domain/24

Queensbury Union Free School District is a public school district that serves Queensbury, New York with 4 schools all on the same campus.

== About ==
QUFSD had 3,349 students in the 2015-2016 academic year with 258 teachers and 493 total staff members.

== List of schools ==
=== Elementary school ===
- Queensbury Elementary School
- William H. Barton Intermediate School

=== Middle schools ===
- Queensbury Middle School

=== High schools ===
- Queensbury High School
