= Elizabeth Eggleston Seelye =

American historian

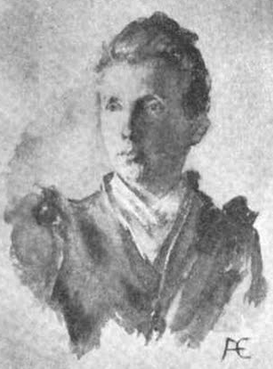
- Born: Elizabeth Craig Eggleston; 15 December 1858; Saint Paul, Minnesota, U.S.
- Died: November 11, 1923 (aged 64); Philadelphia, Pennsylvania, U.S.
- Education: Packer Collegiate Institute
- Occupation: Author
- Spouse: Elwyn Seelye (m. 1877)
- Relatives: Edward Eggleston (father), Allegra Eggleston (sister)
- Writing career
- Language: English
- Genre: biographies

Elizabeth Eggleston Seelye (December 15, 1858 - November 11, 1923) was an American writer and biographer. Her story "The A.O.I.B.R.", which appeared in Harper's Bazaar in 1889 with an illustration of a child reading, is cited by the Rockwell Centre for American Visual Studies as an early illustration of a girl reading. Allegra Eggleston (Seelye's sister) and Rosina Emmet Sherwood provided illustrations for Seelye's stories.

== Early years and education ==
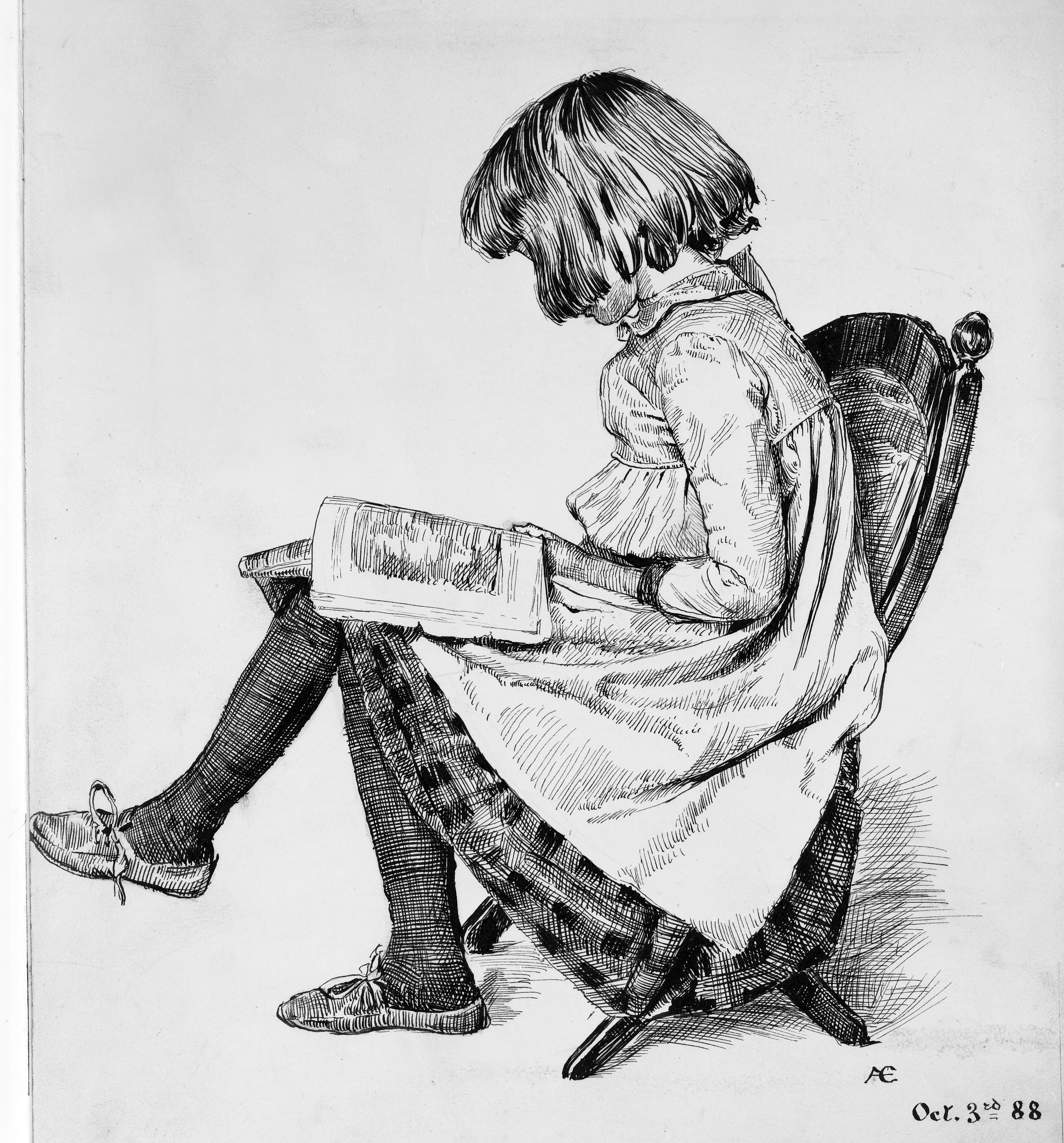
"Disgusted with life, she retired to the society of books", an illustration by Rosina Emmet Sherwood for a story by Seelye in Harper's Young People, April 16, 1889

Elizabeth Craig Eggleston was born in Saint Paul, Minnesota, December 15, 1858. She was a daughter of Edward Eggleston, the novelist. Her mother, Elizabeth, was of English parentage and of a family with talent for graphic art. Seelye early showed the "book hunger" that characterized members of her family. In 1866, the family removed to Evanston, Illinois, where her father had built one of the earliest kindergartens in America where his children might "be trained".

After they moved to Brooklyn, New York, in 1870, Seelye attended Packer Collegiate Institute, but with her parents dissatisfied, she and her sister were soon taught at home by private teachers. She also was the only child to attend adult classes in French and German at the Brooklyn Mercantile Library.

== Career ==
Her love of reading was illustrated in her writing. Her story "The A.O.I.B.R." appeared in Harper's Bazaar in 1889 with an illustration of a child reading. The Rockwell Centre for American Visual Studies cites this as a surprisingly early illustration of a girl reading. The subject of girls reading in the illustration by Rosina Emmet Sherwood is thought rare (like the ones in Louisa May Alcott's Little Women).

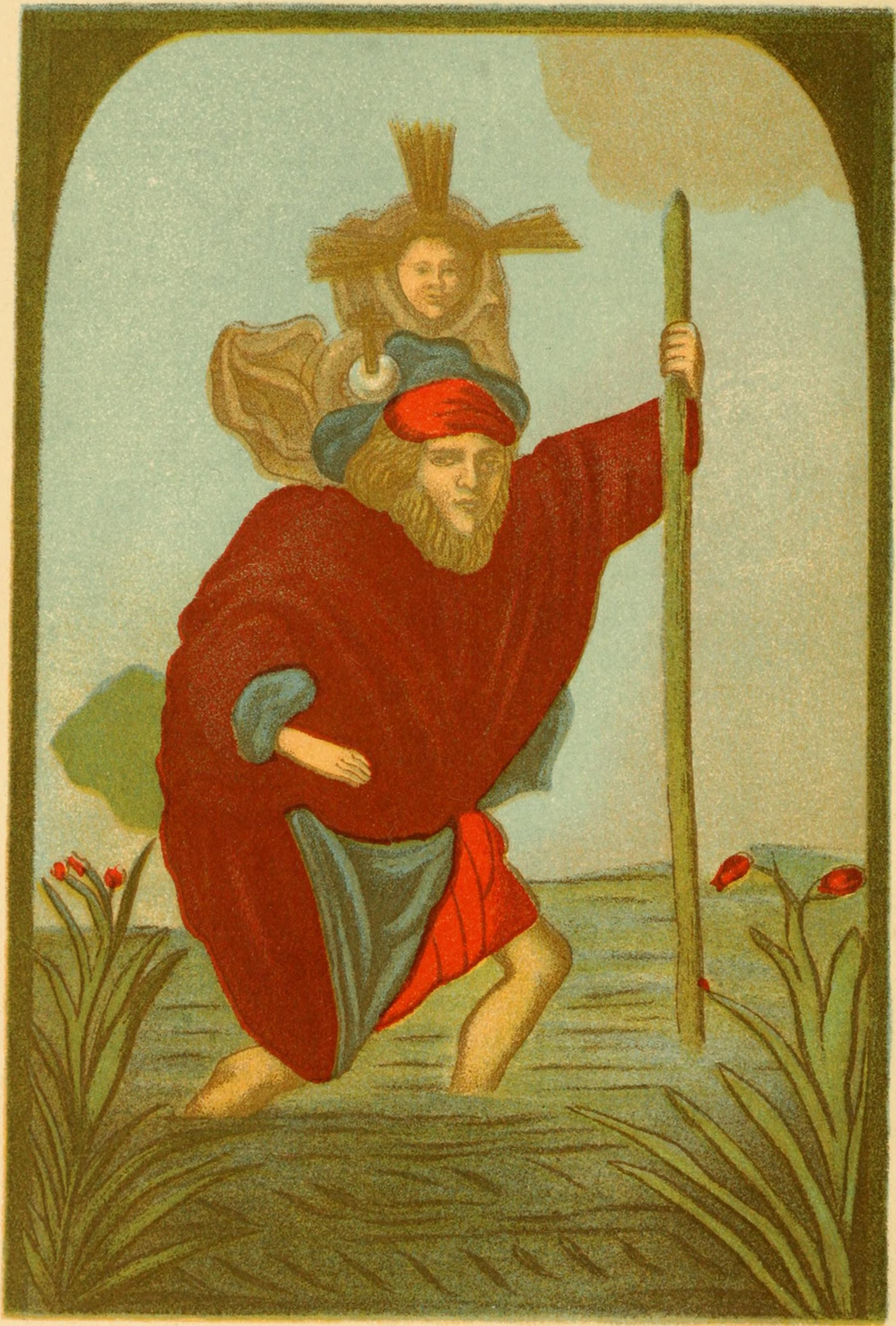
The Story of Columbus (1892)

As an adult, she read works of philosophy, natural science and political economy. Her study of the literature of the Middle English period enabled her to supply the editor of the Century Dictionary with 500 new words and definitions. She wrote four of the five volumes in the Famous American Indian Series, Tecumseh (New York, 1878); Pocahontas (New York, 1879); Brant and Red Jacket (New York, 1879), and Montezuma (New York, 1880). Seelye also published The Story of Columbus (New York, 1892) and The Story of Washington (1893), both illustrated by her sister, Allegra Eggleston.

== Personal life ==
In 1877, she married Elwyn Seelye, and since that time, lived on or near Lake George, New York. Seelye was the mother of six children: Allegra (b. 1878), Blanche (b. 1882), Elwyn (b. 1884), Edward (b. 1888), Cynthia (b. 1888) and Elizabeth (b. 1893). She died November 11, 1923, in Philadelphia, Pennsylvania.

== Selected works ==
- Tecumseh and the Shawnee Prophet, 1878
- Brant and Red Jacket, 1879
- Montezuma and the conquest of Mexico, 1880
- The Indian Princess; or, the Story of Pocahontas, 1881
- The Story of Columbus, 1892
- Story of Washington, 1893
- Lake George in history, 1897
- Saratoga and Lake Champlain in history, 1898
