= Asa Stower House =

Historic house in New York, United States

- U.S. National Register of Historic Places
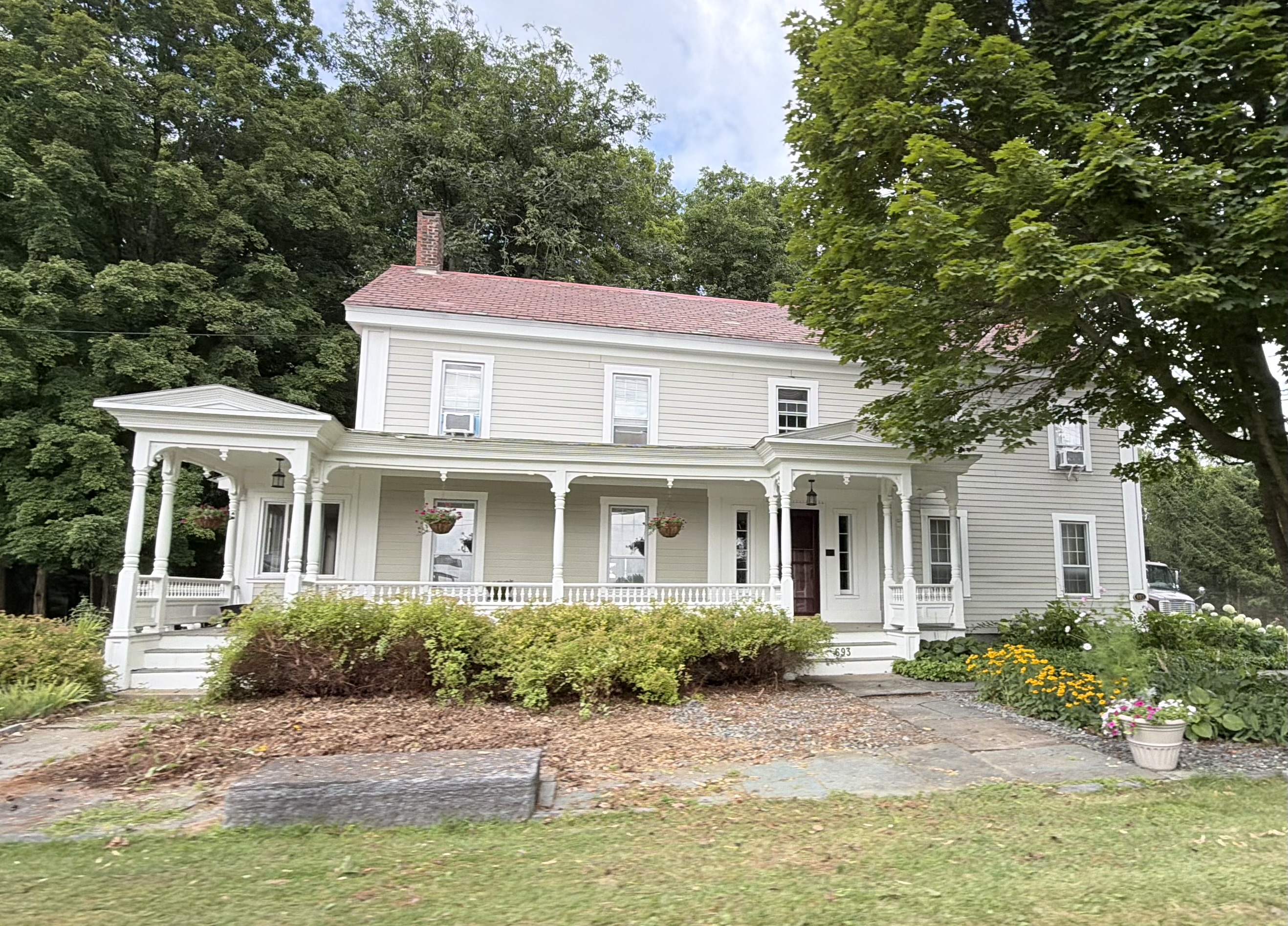
- The Stower House in 2026

- Location within New York Location within the United States
- Location: 693 Ridge Rd., Queensbury, New York
- Coordinates: 43°20′52″N 73°37′13″W
- Area: 1.8 acres (0.73 ha)
- Built: 1806
- Architectural style: Federal
- NRHP reference No.: 06000261
- Added to NRHP: April 12, 2006

Asa Stower House is a historic home located at Queensbury, Warren County, New York. It was a 2 1/2-story, five-by-two-bay, 2-story, side-gabled residence, with a rear ell wing and slate roof in a Federal style. It was built in four phases: a pre-1806 original frame residence incorporated into the rear ell; the c. 1806 main block; renovations dated to about 1850 that added Greek Revival elements; and the Italianate-style front porches added about 1870. It is located adjacent to the Sanford House.

It was added to the National Register of Historic Places in 2006.
