= Washington Correctional Facility =

Medium-security state prison for male prisoners, located in New York, US

Coordinates: 43°28′06″N 73°25′51″W

- Interactive map of Washington Correctional Facility
- Location: Comstock, Town of Fort Ann, Washington County, New York, USA
- Status: Operational
- Security class: Medium
- Capacity: 882
- Opened: 1985
- Managed by: New York State Department of Corrections and Community Supervision

Washington Correctional Facility is a medium-security correctional facility that is located in Comstock, a hamlet in the Town of Fort Ann in Washington County, New York. It is designated for confinement of males age 18 and older. The facility offers volunteer and counseling services, and educational and vocational programs. As of 2010 Washington had a working capacity of 882.

Michael Alig, convicted of the manslaughter of Angel Melendez in 1997, served some of his sentence at Washington.

Joseph Boyajian, convicted of money laundering and public intoxication in 2019, is currently serving a ten year sentence at the facility. Joseph was well known as a local KFC franchisee and the original owner of Bogies in Albany, NY before it collapsed during a Trapt concert.
