= Glen Lake (New York) =

- Location within New York Location within the United States
- Location: Warren County, New York, United States
- Coordinates: 43°21′49″N 73°40′23″W
- Type: Lake
- Basin countries: United States
- Surface area: 320 acres (1.3 km^{2})
- Average depth: 18 feet (5.5 m)
- Max. depth: 50 feet (15 m)
- Shore length^{1}: 5.1 miles (8.2 km)
- Surface elevation: 398 feet (121 m)
- Settlements: French Mountain, New York, Glens Falls, New York
- ^{1} Shore length is not a well-defined measure.

Glen Lake is located north of Glens Falls, New York. Fish species present in the lake are rainbow trout, pickerel, smallmouth bass, largemouth bass, walleye, yellow perch, pumpkinseed sunfish, and brown bullhead. There is a carry down on the northwest shore off Glen Lake Road.
