= Edward Eggleston =

American novelist

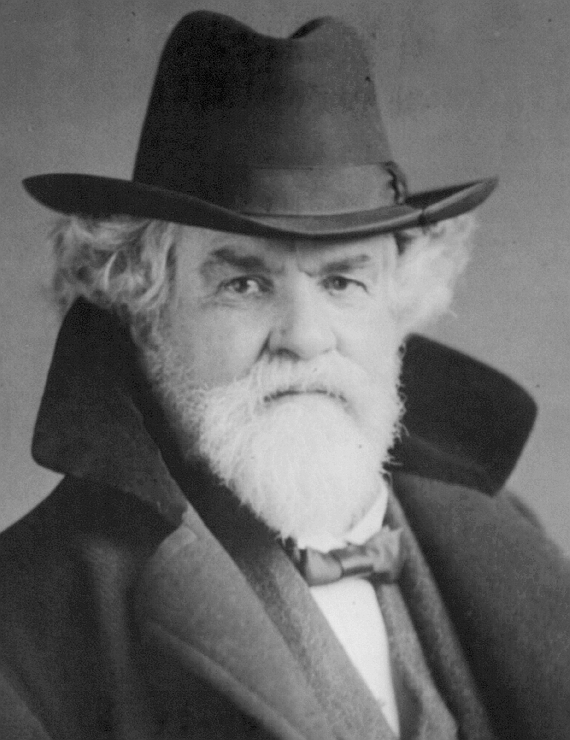
- Born: December 10, 1837; Vevay, Indiana, U.S.
- Died: September 3, 1902 (aged 64); Lake George, New York, U.S.
- Occupations: Historian; Novelist
- Spouses: Elizabeth Goodsmith Snider (m. 1858; died 1890); Frances Goode (m. 1891; death 1902)
- Children: Elizabeth Eggleston Seelye, Allegra Eggleston, Blanche Eggleston, Edward William Eggleston
- Writing career
- Notable work: The Hoosier Schoolmaster (1871)

Edward Eggleston (December 10, 1837 – September 3, 1902) was an American historian and novelist.

== Biography ==
Eggleston was born in Vevay, Indiana on December 10, 1837, to Joseph Cary Eggleston and Mary Jane Craig. The author George Cary Eggleston was his brother. As a child, he was too ill to regularly attend school, so his education was primarily provided by his father. He was ordained as a Methodist minister in 1856. He wrote a number of tales, some of which, especially the "Hoosier" series, attracted much attention. Among these are The Hoosier Schoolmaster, The Hoosier Schoolboy, The End of the World, The Faith Doctor, and Queer Stories for Boys and Girls.

Eggleston used well-known historical events as the basis for several of his novels. In The End of the World, he describes the build-up to the Second Coming of Christ in 1843, as prophesied by William Miller, set in southern Indiana. The Graysons is a fictionalized account of a famous murder trial that Abraham Lincoln won in 1858 in central Illinois. Other books were romanticized stories based on his personal experiences, including The Mystery of Metropolisville, about land speculation in southern Minnesota, and The Circuit Rider, about itinerant preachers, set in southwestern Ohio. Most of his novels contain characters who speak in local "dialect".

He wrote many articles for the children's magazine The Little Corporal, and in 1866, he worked as an editor for the periodical. In December 1866 he accepted a higher-paying editorial position at The Sunday School Teacher. From 1869 to 1877 Eggleston edited the eight-page weekly publication Little Folks, advertised as being "an illustrated Paper, for every Sunday, for Infant Scholars." He wrote two stories for each issue. In 1871 he was briefly the supervising editor of the New York periodical The Independent.

In 1884, Eggleston helped organize the American Historical Association. He was elected its president in 1899. In his presidential address, he called for a change from a history of important battles to one of important lives. Eggleston was elected a member of the American Antiquarian Society in 1893.

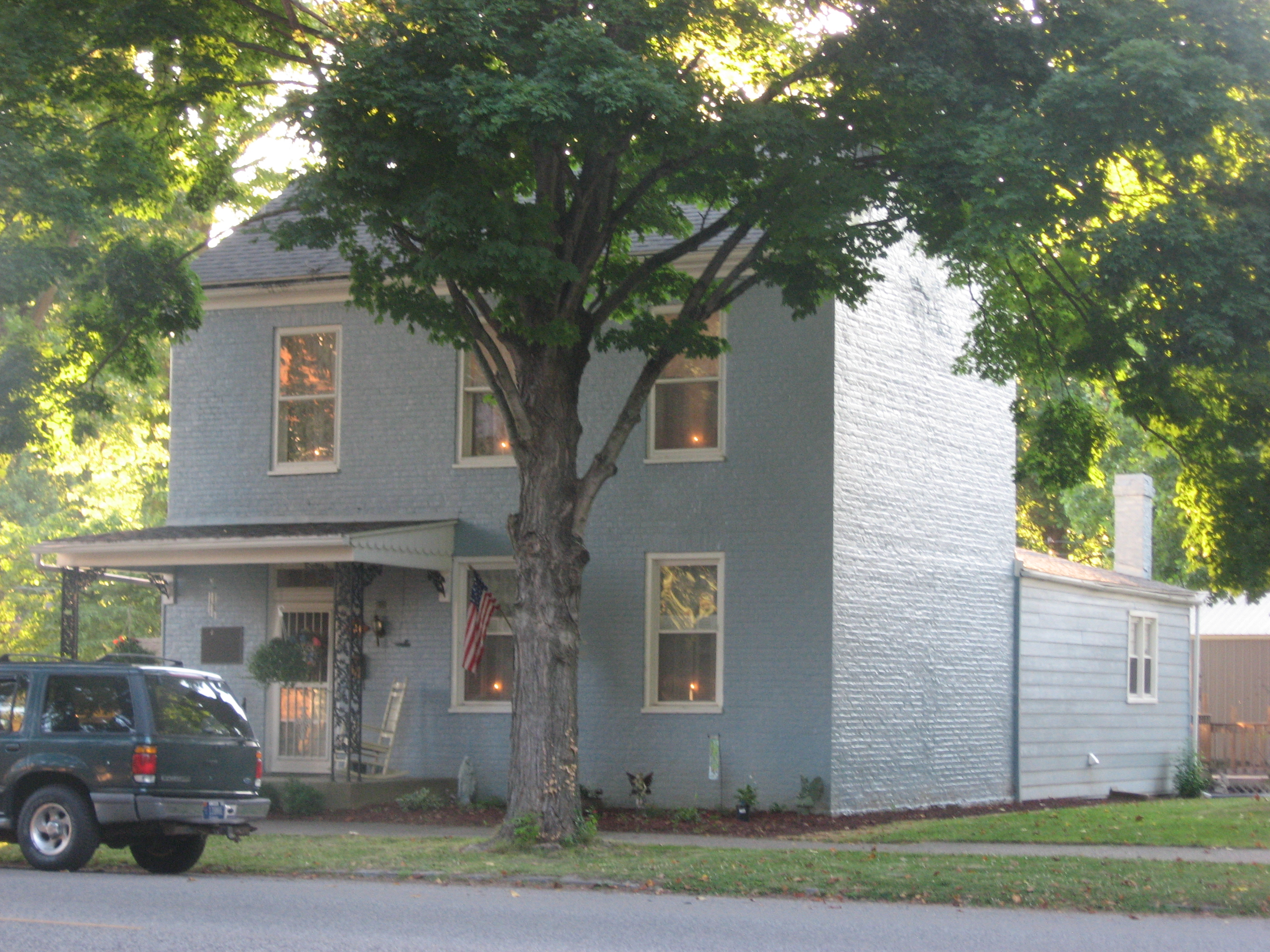
Eggleston's childhood home in Vevay, Indiana

His boyhood home at Vevay, Indiana, known as the Edward and George Cary Eggleston House, was listed on the National Register of Historic Places in 1973. His summer home, Owl's Nest, in Lake George, New York, eventually became his year-round home. Eggleston died there on September 3, 1902, at the age of 64. Owl's Nest was declared a National Historic Landmark in 1971.

His oldest daughter, the writer Elizabeth Eggleston Seelye, was married to Elwyn Seelye, the founder of the New York State Historical Association. His second daughter, Allegra Eggleston, was an artist and illustrator. She collaborated with her sister and her father on a number of books including The Story of Columbus, The Story of Washington, and The Graysons. He had a third daughter, Blanche, and a son, Edward William, who died at age 3.

== Religious background ==
The relationship Eggleston held with religion changed many times throughout his life, yet he left an impact in the activities he took part in as part of his faith. He grew up in a region that had a strong association with Methodism which would become significant attribute of part of his life. Moving further into his practice Eggleston would spread his theology across two states. Eventually would be lead him to non-sectarianism after a moment of being outside his religious values he grew to accept. By the age of 41 he would take on a more agnostic point of view leaving behind his Methodist roots. His explorations of his beliefs were given a position of prominence in his life which prior to him expelling the ideas that he concerned himself with, it sent him down many avenues.

During his adolescence, he would follow a schedule that would strictly dictate when he could pray. The books inspired these methods were specifically recommended by John Wesley for those who would like to pursue a career as a preacher. After reading the information regarding this lifestyle pattern, Eggleston began engaging with the instruction he learned. This schedule required him to wake up at four in the morning and pray for an hour uninterrupted. Past that initial prayer, throughout the day he would pray at specific times, and he would also eat sparingly. Given the dedication he had showed for his faith at an early age, it would push him further into spreading the word of Methodism.

Determined to share his theology with others Eggleston took up different professions to amplify his voice. His commitment to his religion guided him to acquire a license to work as a Methodist circuit rider. The actions he took served the purpose of strengthening his faith through the act of service. He also worked as a Bible agent and eventually transitioned to become a pastor which happened in a nine-year period he spent in Minnesota. Shortly after turning 21 years old, in 1959, he was operating a pastor for a Methodist church in Minnesota that was regarded as one of the biggest in the state. His youth revolved immensely around his religion which granted him these opportunities. As he got older his perspective started to change which shifted the trajectory of his future.

After spending time in Minnesota, he decided to take up different ventures elsewhere. Eggleston would leave the state in 1866 and move to Evanston, Illinois where he would start as an associate editor of the Little Corporal in Chicago. Upon leaving Minnesota he also made the decision in reducing the power of his perspective on the Methodist faith. Even though he left that portion of his life in past it did not eliminate his ambition towards religion fully and continued work in Sunday-school activities. This could be attributed to his enjoyment in teaching children who he found to be his most well-rounded listeners. Identifying his audience gave him purpose when engaging with the ideas that still remained of his faith. Their immature behavior did not bother him while bring them joy and making attempts to hold their attention.

Observing the decisions Eggleston has made within his practice of religion, he has formed a significant footprint in regard to the influence he made. Archives of church history it shows that he founded the first Christian Endeavor Society in America. Moving forward this would signify a prominent moment in the religious journey Eggleston has taken. In the latter half of 1870s he had exhausted his mental growth that would decrease his Sunday sermons and remove any association with orthodox Christian dogma.

== Career beginnings ==
Edward Eggleston's professional life began in the early 1860s when he worked as a Methodist circuit rider preacher in the rural Midwest. Serving congregations in Indiana and Minnesota, Eggleston traveled extensively to isolated frontier communities. His main goals: preaching and ministering to settlers. He taught from what he was taught as a young child and what he experienced growing up. During these years, he was exposed to the language, customs, and challenges of pioneer life, shaping the realistic depictions that would later characterize his fiction. Eggleston's work as a preacher emphasized practical, religious teaching, avoiding heavy theological abstractions in favor of moral instruction rooted in everyday life.

Although he was largely self-educated due to childhood illness, Eggleston developed a deep knowledge of theology, history, and literature. His sermons and writing began blending humor, realism, and moral themes distinguishing him from the more traditional preachers of that period. His literary career was launched when he began publishing short stories about Midwestern life, particularly focusing on the experiences of ordinary frontier settlers. These early works gained attention for their authentic use of dialect and for presenting the rural American experience without romanticizing it. As it will be discussed later, he gained a lot of traction with these stories before he rapidly began gaining popularity with The Hoosier Schoolmaster. In his books, his main goal was to clearly portray the "photographic exactness" of the real West.

Eggleston's reputation as a writer grew further when he took editorial positions at religious and educational journals. These included The Little Corporal and The Sunday School Teacher. Eggleston was a well-known children's writer, so his addition to The Little Corporal was viewed as a big deal. His editorial work allowed him to champion a more progressive and relatable style of Christian education. Besides that, it provided him a platform to develop his fictional writing alongside all the kids stories he wrote. By the late 1860s, Eggleston had established himself as both an influential educator and one of the first American authors to offer a realistic portrayal of life in the rural Midwest.

== Principal works ==
Novels

- The Hoosier Schoolmaster (1871)
- The End of the World (1872)
- The Mystery of Metropolisville (1873)
- The Circuit Rider (1874)
- Roxy (1878)
- The Graysons (1888)
- The Faith Doctor (1891)
- Duffels (short stories) (1893)

Juvenile

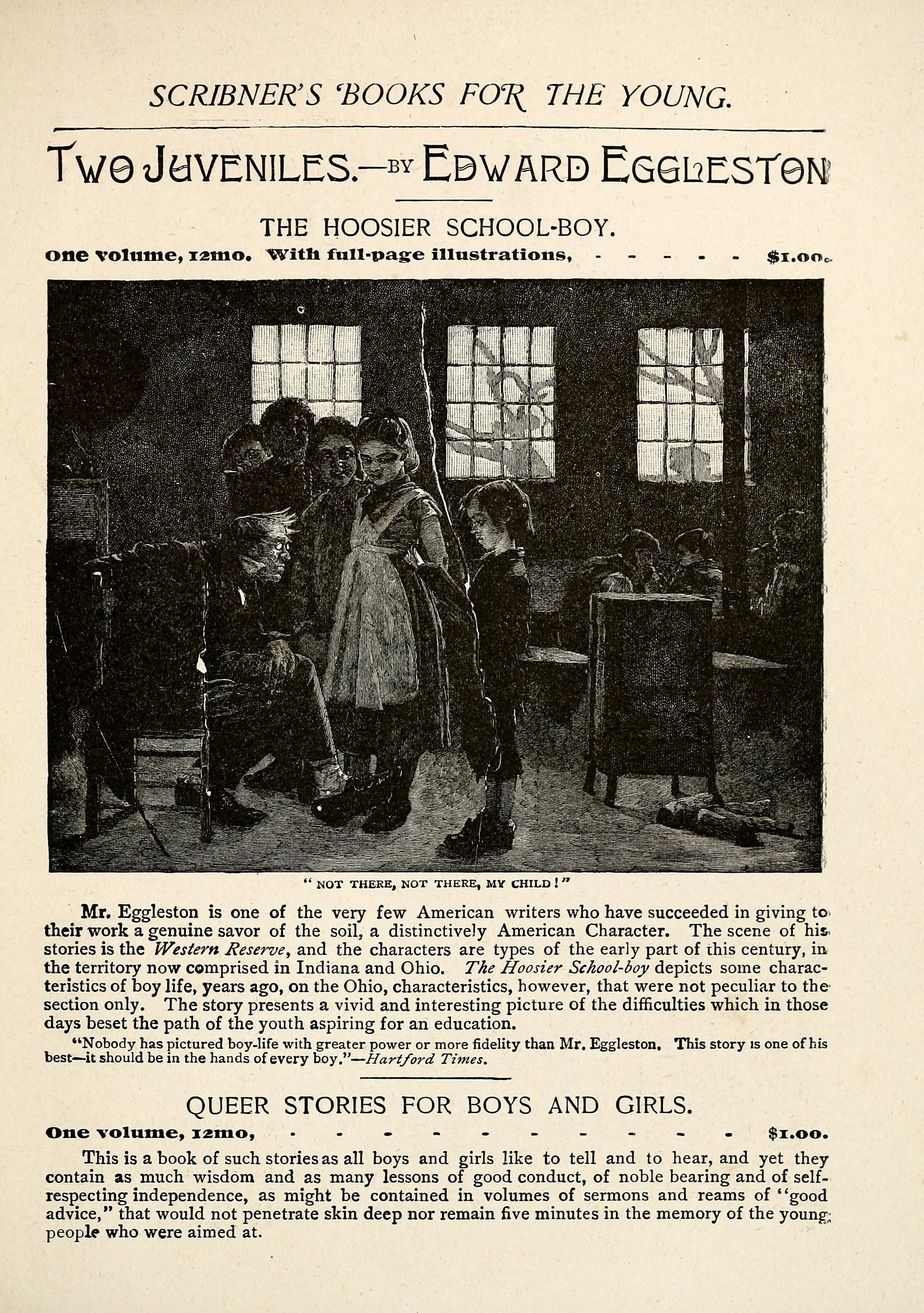
Illustration from The Hoosier Schoolboy

- Mr. Blake's Walking Stick (1870)
- Tecumseh and the Shawnee Prophet (1878)
- Pocahontus and Powhatan (1879)
- Montezuma (1880)
- The Hoosier Schoolboy (1883)
- Queer Stories for Boys and Girls (1884)
- Stories of Great Americans for Little Americans (1895)
- Home History of the United States (1889)

History

- A History of the United States and Its People (1888)
- The Beginners of a Nation (1896)
- The Transit of Civilization From England to America (1901)
- New Centennial History of the United States (1904)

Religion

- Christ in Art (1875)
- Christ in Literature (1875)

== Major works ==
Edward Eggleston's literary reputation was firmly established with the publican of The Hoosier Schoolmaster in 1871. Based mostly on his experiences in rural Indiana, the novel portrays the challenges faced by a schoolteacher in a frontier community. Eggleston's use of local dialect and his societal observations create a vivid description of backwoods life, contrasting the rough environment with the teacher's efforts to bring order to the school. The novel was one of the first to authentically portray the rural Midwest and became a foundation work of regional realism.

Following this success, Eggleston continued to explore Midwestern and religious themes in his work. In The End of the World (1872), he depicted Millerite movement, a religious phenomenon predicting the imminent Second Coming of Christ in 1843. The novel was set in southern Indiana and examined the intense emotional and social upheaval caused by apocalyptic beliefs. Eggleston portrayed the sincerity and human frailty of those caught up in the movement, offering a complex look at religious enthusiasm. This work also reflects the broader 19th century debate about faith, reason, and the changing American society.

The Circuit Rider (1874) drew directly from Eggleston's own experiences as a young Methodist preacher. It tells the story of an itinerant minister traveling through the frontier regions of Ohio and Indiana, facing physical dangers, spiritual struggles, and the hardships of isolated communities. Through its realistic portrayal of the circuit system, the novel highlights the role of religion in shaping frontier society. It also emphasizes the personal sacrifices required of the clergy. The Circuit Rider is considered one of Eggleston's most historically grounded works, notable for blending religious history with regional storytelling.

Eggleston's Roxy (1878) led his writings towards more complex literary themes and character development. The novel centers on Roxy, a strong-willed woman navigating personal and social challenges in a small rural community. Unlike many of Eggleston's earlier works, Roxy delves into psychological depth, portraying internal conflicts with societal pressure, subtlety applying realism. The novel explores issues such as gender roles, personal agency, and the influence of community expectations, setting it apart as one of Eggleston's most mature and literary achievements.

== Writing style ==
The work that Edward Eggleston produced came from a specific style that would be a staple of his writing. Like authors such as Mark Twain and William Dean Howells, Eggleston made major contributions to pushing the general and critical approval of literary genre known as realism. Much of the texts he created aided in the popularization of the Middle West as a region to be utilized in literature. As he continued to write there have been other influences that conditioned the direction of his creative expression. On top of his work as a realist, he also made efforts in elevating the structure of naturalism or veritism. Readers who followed Eggleston would become familiar with direction he would take with everything he published. He was noted deliver a style that was very comprehensive with a strong basis of knowledge on what he wrote about.

Eggleston's time in Minnesota shaped a lot of his regional literature and inspired the approach he took when elaborating on an aspect of his stories. When constructing his written material he operated under a particular format that focused on an authentic image of being person in the era of his interest. He prioritized making every event that he wrote seem natural to the eyes of another person living in a Western region. Much of his writing involved events commonly occur in those areas such as barbecues, political rallies, Methodist revivals, and spelling bees.

For much of his early work Eggleston was very detail oriented when it came to the portrayal of his characters. It made him consider non-verbal and verbal language that affected the mentality of fictionalized individuals. Each person displayed in his writing had to seem as if they could exist. Handling dialogue, Eggleston considered his principles involved regional literature which would affect the vernacular of how one of his created personalities would talk. Realism firmly pushed his ideas concerning the lifestyles and settings shown in his work.

== Later life ==
In 1891, Eggleston would go on to marry Frances Goode. Their marriage did not result in children. They remained married until Eggleston died in 1902. In 1900, Eggleston served as the president of the American Historical Association. He is noted in his later life to have devoted much effort to his historical writings. His works from this era span from school books to a project called "A History of Life in the United States". Eggleston suffered from a stroke in 1899, leaving him partially disabled. On September 2, 1902, Eggleston died due to a second stroke.

== Legacy ==
Eggleston is noted as having written about the American Midwest in a time in which the United States was expanding westward.

His only posthumous work, The New Century History of the United States, was released in 1904, two years after his death.
