= Sanford House (Queensbury, New York) =

Historic house in New York, United States

- U.S. National Register of Historic Places
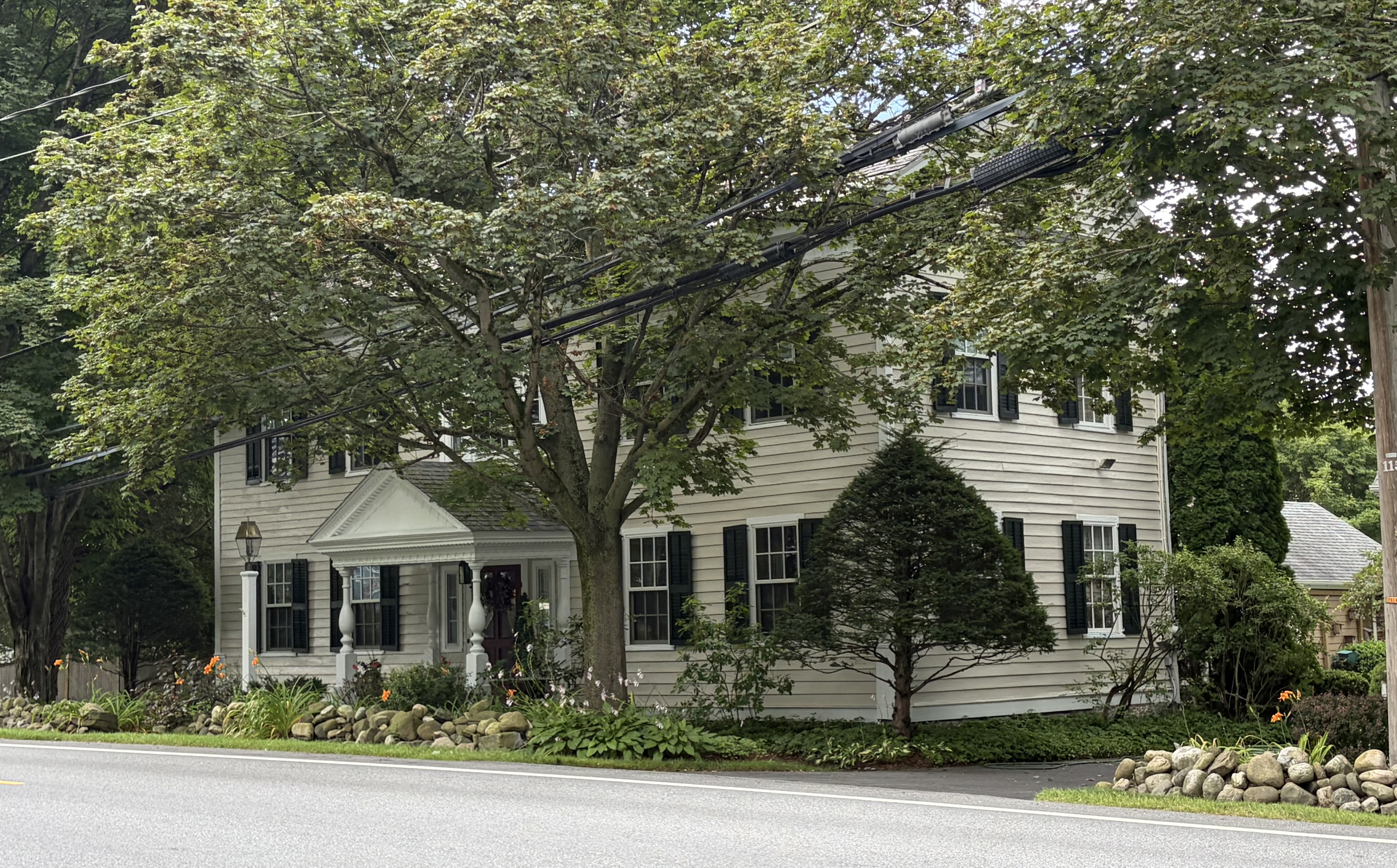
- The Sanford House in 2026

- Location within New York Location within the United States
- Location: 749 Ridge Rd., Queensbury, New York
- Coordinates: 43°21′6″N 73°37′15″W
- Area: 3.3 acres (1.3 ha)
- Built: 1797
- Architect: Jenkins, De Witt C.
- Architectural style: Federal
- NRHP reference No.: 98000549
- Added to NRHP: May 29, 1998

Sanford House is a historic home located at Queensbury, Warren County, New York. It was built about 1797 and is a formal, five-by-two-bay 2-story Federal-style house with Georgian-inspired details. It is of post-and-beam construction with wide clapboard sheathing. It features an elaborate center entrance porch with a second-story Palladian window. It is located adjacent to the Asa Stower House.

It was added to the National Register of Historic Places in 1984.
