= Allegra Eggleston =

American illustrator and painter

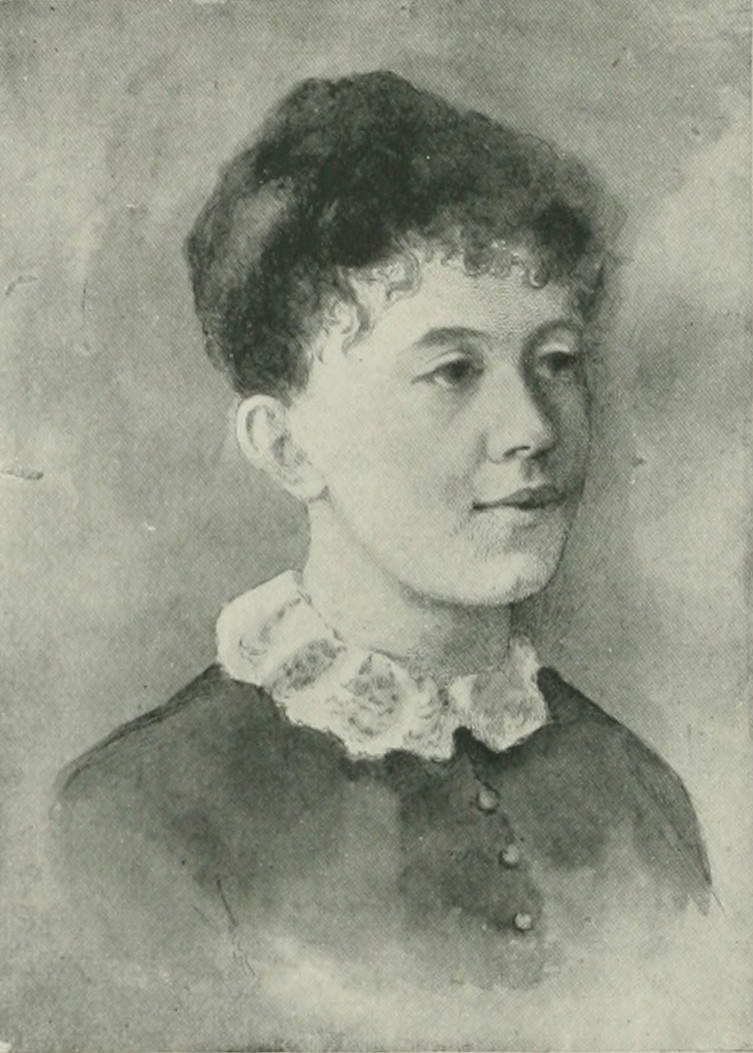
Allegra Eggleston

Allegra Eggleston (November 19, 1860 - 1933) was a 19th-century American artist from the U.S. state of Minnesota. She occupied herself as a woodcarver, portrait painter, and book illustrator. As an illustrator, she collaborated with her sister, Elizabeth Eggleston Seelye, and her father, Edward Eggleston, on a number of books including The story of Columbus (1892), The story of Washington, and The Graysons.

== Early years and education ==
Allegra Eggleston was born in Stillwater, Minnesota, November 19, 1860. She was the second daughter of Edward Eggleston, the author, who came of a well-known Virginia family, with strains of Irish and Scotch in his descent. Her mother's family was of English origin. A delicate and high-strung child, she early showed a talent for drawing and modeling. One of her first works of art was an idol carved out of a piece of semi-decayed wood, when she was only six years of age. She drew constantly and modeled occasionally in clay, but she had no art teaching until she was received into classes in Cooper Institute in October, 1875. She was under age, being only 14, but was accepted on account of remarkable promise. She did creditable work there for two years, after which she entered the studio of Wyatt Eaton, where she made rapid progress in painting from life. In 1878, she went to Europe in company with her father and family for a year. While abroad, she took lessons under a Swiss wood-carver in Paris and astonished him by successfully carving the most difficult pieces as soon as she had learned the use of her tools. About 1891, she returned to study art in Paris with Charles Lasar and was friends with the American miniaturist from Cleveland, Sarah Elizabeth Rickey (1844-1923).

== Career ==
After her return home, she occupied herself with wood-carving, painting also some portraits, which were exhibited in the annual exhibitions of the Society of American Artists. In 1882, she carved panels for a memorial mantel piece in the editorial rooms of The Century Magazine, on one of which was cut a portrait in bas-relief of Dr. Josiah Gilbert Holland. That piece of work was destroyed by fire in 1888, and Eggleston was called upon to replace it. Later, she occupied herself with book illustrations. Her father's novel, The Graysons, is illustrated by her, while many of the pictures in his popular school histories, as well as in other school books, bear her signature. She illustrated The story of Columbus, written by her sister, Elizabeth Eggleston Seelye, and edited by their father, as well as The story of Washington.

Eggleston was versatile. She created many kinds of artistic decorative works for amusement including paintings of children's faces. Among other things she modeled in leather, having executed the cover for the album containing autographs of distinguished American authors, which was presented to Mrs. Grover Cleveland, Frances Folsom Cleveland Preston, as an acknowledgment of her interest in the father's copyright bill, International Copyright Act of 1891.

== Personal life ==
Eggleston spent the winter in New York City and made her home during the rest of the year at Lake George, where she had a studio in her father's stone library. She lived unmarried in The Owl's Nest with her friend Mabel Cook. Known as Tante, Eggleston died in 1933.

== Gallery ==
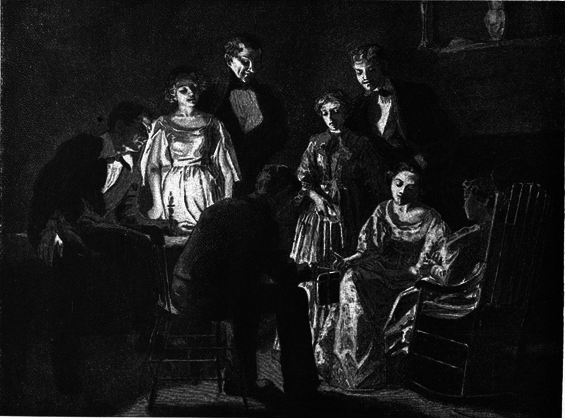
Frontispiece, The Graysons (1887)

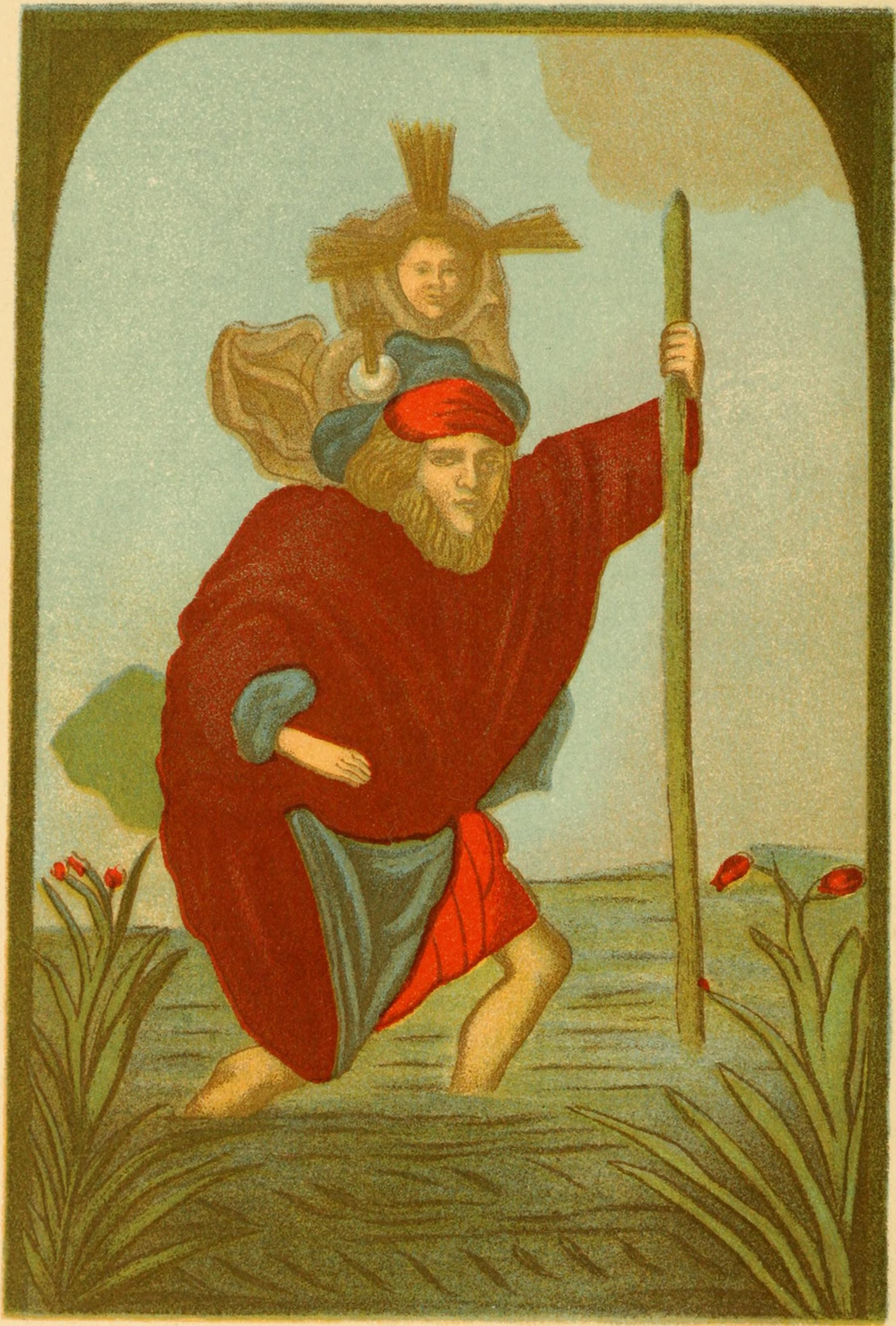
Frontispiece, The story of Columbus (1892)

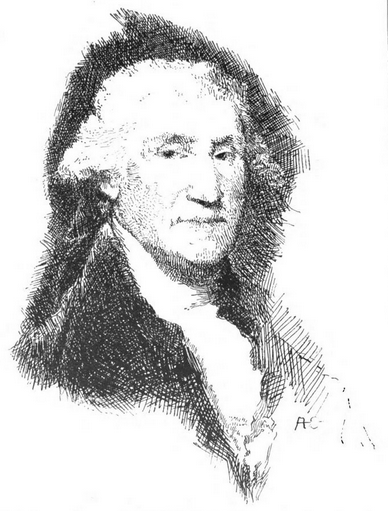
Frontispiece, The Story of Washington (1893)
