= Queensbury High School =

Coordinates: 43°19′50″N 73°41′31″W

- 409 Aviation Road; Queensbury, NY 12804; United States

Information
- Established: 1963
- School district: Queensbury Union Free School District
- Principal: Andrew Snide
- Teaching staff: 84.63 (FTE)
- Grades: 9-12
- Enrollment: 974 (2023–2024)
- Student to teacher ratio: 11.51
- Language: English
- Colors: Blue, Gold, and White
- Mascot: Spartan
- Rival: Glens Falls High School
- Yearbook: Orbit
- Website: http://www.queensburyschool.org/schools/QHS/

Queensbury High School (QHS) is a public high school located in Queensbury, Warren County, New York, United States. It was founded in 1963 and is one of four schools in the Queensbury Union Free School District. The other schools include Queensbury Elementary School, William H. Barton Intermediate School, and Queensbury Middle School. The High School has a student run Help Desk, where students repair Chromebooks and provide tech help to students and staff alike.

== History ==
The school was opened in September 1963 although parts of the school, such as the gymnasium, were unfinished. By 26 April, the school was finished and the community was invited to the school for tours. Today, the school has more than 1,000 attending students with an extensive sports program and an International Baccalaureate (IB) diploma program.

== Notable alumni ==
- Adam Terry - Player for the Baltimore Ravens in the National Football League.
- Brendan Harris - Player for the Minnesota Twins in Major League Baseball.
- Dan Stec (New York State Assemblyman)
