= Hadlock Pond =

Hadlock Pond or Lake Hadlock
- Location within New York Hadlock Pond or Lake Hadlock (the United States)
- Location: Washington County, New York
- Coordinates: 43°25′25″N 73°34′20″W
- Type: Reservoir
- Primary inflows: Bishop Brook
- Basin countries: United States
- Surface area: 220 acres (89 ha)
- Average depth: 16 feet (4.9 m)
- Max. depth: 43 feet (13 m)
- Shore length^{1}: 4.6 miles (7.4 km)
- Surface elevation: 453 ft (138 m)
- Islands: 2
- Settlements: Fort Ann, New York
- ^{1} Shore length is not a well-defined measure.

Hadlock Pond, also known as Lake Hadlock or Sunderland Pond, is a small, private, man-made reservoir formed on a tributary of Halfway Creek in the Town of Fort Ann in Washington County, New York, United States.

Constructed in 1896, the original dam was of earthen construction, or rock fill. It had a height of 29 feet (8.8 m), with a width of 850 feet (260 m). The dam was reconstructed in 2005, only to collapse months later, flooding and damaging nearby property.

The pond is owned by the town of Fort Ann, and is primarily used for recreational purposes. The pond has a surface area of 220 acres (0.89 km^{2}).

== Fishing ==
Fish species in the lake include northern pike, white sucker, brown bullhead, rock bass, pumpkinseed sunfish, bluegill, smallmouth bass, largemouth bass, crappie, and yellow perch. This is a private lake in the Adirondacks and you must own property on the lake to access.
