= Queensbury, New York =

Queensbury
- Town
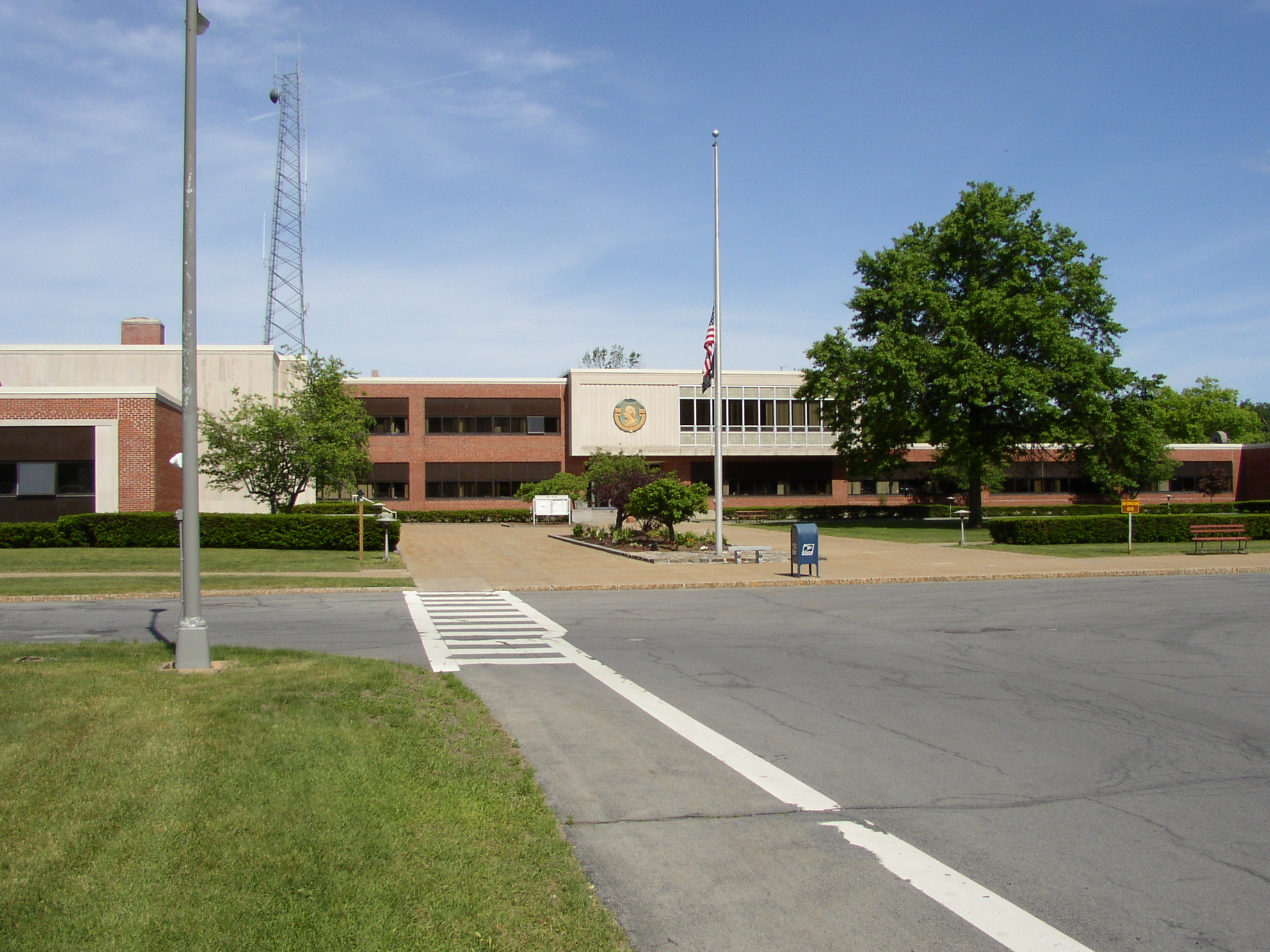
- Warren County Municipal Center
- Motto: Home of Natural Beauty ... A Good Place to Live
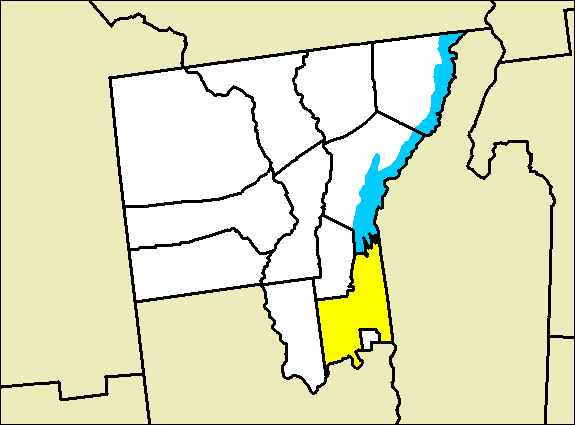
- Location of Queensbury within Warren County

- Location of Queensbury in New York
- Coordinates (Seat of town government): 43°21′34″N 73°39′25″W
- Country: United States
- State: New York
- County: Warren
- Established: 1786
- Named for: Charlotte of Mecklenburg-Strelitz
- Seat: Queensbury Town Center

Government
  - Supervisor: John Strough (Democrat)

Area
  - Total: 64.84 sq mi (167.93 km^{2})
  - Land: 62.83 sq mi (162.73 km^{2})
  - Water: 2.01 sq mi (5.20 km^{2}) 2.78%
- Elevation: 502 ft (153 m)

Population (2020)
  - Total: 29,169
  - Density: 464.25/sq mi (179.25/km^{2})
- Time zone: UTC-5 (EST)
  - Summer (DST): UTC-4 (EDT)
- ZIP code: 12804
- Area code: 518
- Official butterfly: Karner Blue
- FIPS code: 36-113-60356
- Website: https://www.queensbury.net

Queensbury is a town in Warren County, New York, United States. The population was 29,169 at the 2020 census.

It contains the county seat of Warren County, located at a municipal center complex on U.S. Route 9 south of the village of Lake George. It was moved to the complex in 1963 from the original county seat of Lake George. The town is located in the southeastern corner of the county and is part of the Glens Falls Metropolitan Statistical Area. It is named in honor of Queen Charlotte. Although primarily located north of the city of Glens Falls, Queensbury surrounds the city on three sides.

Great Escape, a theme park operated by Enchanted Parks, is located in northwest Queensbury. West Mountain, a downhill skiing area, is located in the southwestern part of town.

== History ==
The roots of Queensbury trace back to the Queensbury Patent in 1762, a colonial land grant authorized by the British Crown. It was designed to encourage settlement in the area near the southern Adirondack foothills, close to Lake George and the Hudson River. This patent, named in honor of Queen Charlotte, wife of King George III, successfully attracted Quaker settlers the following year in 1763. Quaker families began to move into the area, clearing land and establishing farms and homesteads. In 1777, their peaceful existence was disrupted by the Revolutionary War. The Quakers, known for their pacifist beliefs, abandoned Queensbury during the war due to hostilities and the proximity to military campaigns. The region was largely uninhabited during this period. Following the end of the war, the Quakers returned to Queensbury in 1783 and resumed their settlement efforts.

In 1786, the settlement was re-established as the town of Queensbury. In 1788, the town included all of what is today Warren County. It lost territory in 1792 when the town of Fairfield (Lake Luzerne) was formed and again in 1810 to form part of the town of Caldwell (Lake George). In 1908, the then largest village within Queensbury, Glens Falls, incorporated as a city and became a separate municipality. The population of Queensbury has exceeded that of Glens Falls since the 1980 Census.

In 2003, with permission from Queensbury, Glens Falls annexed approximately 49 acres (0.20 km^{2}) of the town. The land, known as Veterans Field or the Northway Industrial Park, is on Veterans Road between Luzerne Road and Sherman Avenue and is just east of I-87. The land was vacant at the time. A thin, 0.5 miles (0.80 km) strip of Sherman Avenue was part of this annexation, in order to comply with state law regarding contiguity of annexed land. Both the city and town now share ownership of this stretch of highway as a result.

The Sanford House and Asa Stower House are listed on the National Register of Historic Places.

== Geography ==
According to the United States Census Bureau, the town has a total area of 64.81 square miles (167.9 km^{2}), of which 63.01 square miles (163.2 km^{2}) is land and 1.80 square miles (4.7 km^{2}) (2.78%) is water. The town is located within the southeastern part of the Adirondack Mountains. The western town line is the border with the town of Lake Luzerne. The southern town boundary is defined by the border with the city of Glens Falls and the Hudson River, across which lies Saratoga County. The eastern town line is the border of Washington County, also New York State. The northern border is defined by the town of Lake George and, according to the town and Warren County, by the shoreline of the body of water, Lake George, itself. However, several maps, including those published by the USGS, depict the northern boundary as including part of the lake, including Speaker Heck Island and Happy Family Islands.

Parts of western and northern Queensbury are within the Adirondack Park.

== Demographics ==
Historical population
Census	Pop.	Note	%±
1820	2,433		—
1830	3,080		26.6%
1840	3,789		23.0%
1850	2,597		−31.5%
1860	7,146		175.2%
1870	8,387		17.4%
1880	9,805		16.9%
1890	2,340		−76.1%
1900	2,377		1.6%
1910	2,667		12.2%
1920	2,584		−3.1%
1930	3,169		22.6%
1940	4,199		32.5%
1950	5,907		40.7%
1960	10,004		69.4%
1970	14,506		45.0%
1980	18,978		30.8%
1990	22,630		19.2%
2000	25,441		12.4%
2010	27,901		9.7%
2020	29,169		4.5%
U.S. Decennial Census

As of the census of 2020, there were 29,169 people, 12,907 households, and 8,308 families residing in the town. The population density was 464.5 inhabitants per square mile (179.3/km^{2}). There were 11,223 housing units at an average density of 178.1 per square mile (68.8/km^{2}). The racial makeup of the town was 93.4% White, 0.9% African American, 0.20% Native American, 0.5% Asian, 0.02% Pacific Islander, 0.22% from other races, and 4.1% from two or more races. Hispanic or Latino of any race were 3.3% of the population.

There were 12,907 households, out of which 34.0% had children under the age of 18 living with them, 59.1% were married couples living together, 9.4% had a female householder with no husband present, and 28.0% were non-families. 22.6% of all households were made up of individuals, and 11.0% had someone living alone who was 65 years of age or older. The average household size was 2.22 and the average family size was 2.97.

In the town, the population was spread out, with 25.3% under the age of 18, 6.1% from 18 to 24, 28.3% from 25 to 44, 25.1% from 45 to 64, and 15.2% who were 65 years of age or older. The median age was 39 years. For every 100 females, there were 92.2 males. For every 100 females age 18 and over, there were 89.4 males.

The median income for a household in the town was $47,225, and the median income for a family was $54,880. Males had a median income of $39,260 versus $25,036 for females. The per capita income for the town was $24,096. About 3.8% of families and 5.0% of the population were below the poverty line, including 7.4% of those under age 18 and 2.2% of those age 65 or over.

== Government ==
Queensbury is a town of the first class, and as such has a town board with a town supervisor and four councilmen. Town residents petitioned to establish a ward system in 1981 and again in 1985 whereby the town would be divided into four wards. In a ward system, whereas the supervisor is elected by the entire town electorate, each councilman is elected by only the electorate of the ward he or she will be representing. Having been approved by the voters by referendum in 1985, the first town board to be elected under the ward system convened in 1986. Queensbury is one of only ten of New York's 932 towns that had a ward system as of 2000. The town has an ethics board, planning board, and zoning board of appeals.

As of 2025, the town government officials are:

- John Strough – Town Supervisor
- Anthony Metivier – Deputy Supervisor; Councilman, Ward 1
- Scott Gushlaw – Councilman, Ward 2
- Michael Dixon – Councilman, Ward 3
- Timothy McNulty – Councilman, Ward 4

In county government, Queensbury is entitled to five of the 20 seats on the Warren County Board of Supervisors. (Glens Falls also has five seats, whereas the remaining ten towns in the county have one seat each.) Four of Queensbury's seats are filled by town-wide election, whereas the fifth is reserved for the town supervisor.

== Emergency services ==
Emergency services can be accessed by dialing 911, which routes calls to Warren County's 911 Communications Center.

Law enforcement and other police services are provided by the Warren County Sheriff's Office and are supplemented by the New York State Police, which maintains a barracks in the town. Queensbury has not had its own police force since disbanding it in 1982.

The town is divided into five fire protection districts: Bay Ridge, North Queensbury, Queensbury Central, South Queensbury, and West Glens Falls. Each district contains at least one fire station, with Queensbury Central and West Glens Falls each having two stations.

Three emergency medical services (EMS) districts provide out-of-hospital acute care and ambulance services: Bay Ridge EMS, North Queensbury EMS, and West Glens Falls EMS.

A State Emergency Management Office regional office is located on Fox Farm Road.

== Culture ==
Queensbury was the home of the Lake George Opera Festival from 1965 to 1998. During this period, the festival was held in the 875-seat Queensbury High School auditorium, producing three to seven operas per year.

== Education ==
=== Public school districts ===
The town of Queensbury falls within four public school districts:

- Glens Falls City School District
- Hudson Falls Central School District
- Lake George Central School District
- Queensbury Union Free School District

=== Postsecondary education ===
- SUNY Adirondack – part of the State University of New York System
- SUNY Plattsburgh at Queensbury – a branch campus that is part of the State University of New York at Plattsburgh

== Notable people ==
- Brendan Harris (born 1980) – professional baseball infielder; grew up in Queensbury.
- Solomon Northup (c. 1807-1808–1864) – American abolitionist and author; lived with his daughter Margaret Stanton and her family in Queensbury by 1855.
- Johnny Podres (1932–2008) – Major League Baseball pitcher; lived in Queensbury following his baseball career.
- Derek Richardson (born 1976) – Hollywood and TV actor; born and raised in Queensbury.
- Elwyn Seelye (1848–1920) – founder of the New York State Historical Association and the first custodian of the Lake George battlefield site.
- Joe Sylvester (1893–1976) – first golf professional at the Glens Falls Country Club in 1914.
- Adam Terry (born 1982) – professional football lineman; grew up in Queensbury, where he played high school football.

== Communities and locations in the Town of Queensbury ==
- Brayton – hamlet in the northeastern part of town.
- East Lake George – hamlet in the northern part of the town and including part of the town of Fort Ann, located in Washington County. The hamlet attempted to incorporate as a village, a measure rejected by voters in 2010.
- Floyd Bennett Memorial Airport (GFL) – airport, formerly known as the Warren County Airport, in the southeastern part of the town.
- French Mountain – hamlet northwest of Glen Lake that shares its name with the mountain to its northeast.
- Glen Lake – hamlet and lake north of Glens Falls North.
- Glens Falls North – census-designated place along the northern borders of Glens Falls and West Glens Falls.
- Great Escape and Great Escape Lodge – amusement park, water park and lodge located in Queensbury; opened 1954 as Storytown, U.S.A.
- Harrisena – hamlet roughly following State Route 9L in the northern section of the town which borders Lake George. Granted to American Revolutionary War spy Moses Harris Jr. for his service in the war.
- Kattskill Bay – hamlet in the northeasternmost area of the town.
- Lake Sunnyside – small lake and hamlet in the east-central portion of the town.
- Oneida Corners – hamlet at the modern junction of Sunnyside Road and State Route 9L.
- Paradise Beach – hamlet in the vicinity of The Great Escape and Round Pond on County Route 17.
- Queensbury – hamlet located in the east part of the town near the Queensbury-Kingsbury-Fort Ann town lines.
- West Glens Falls – hamlet and census-designated place bordering the western side of the city of Glens Falls.
- Other hamlets – Jenkinsville, South Queensbury, Top O' the World, West Mountain
