= East Lake George, New York =

East Lake George
- hamlet
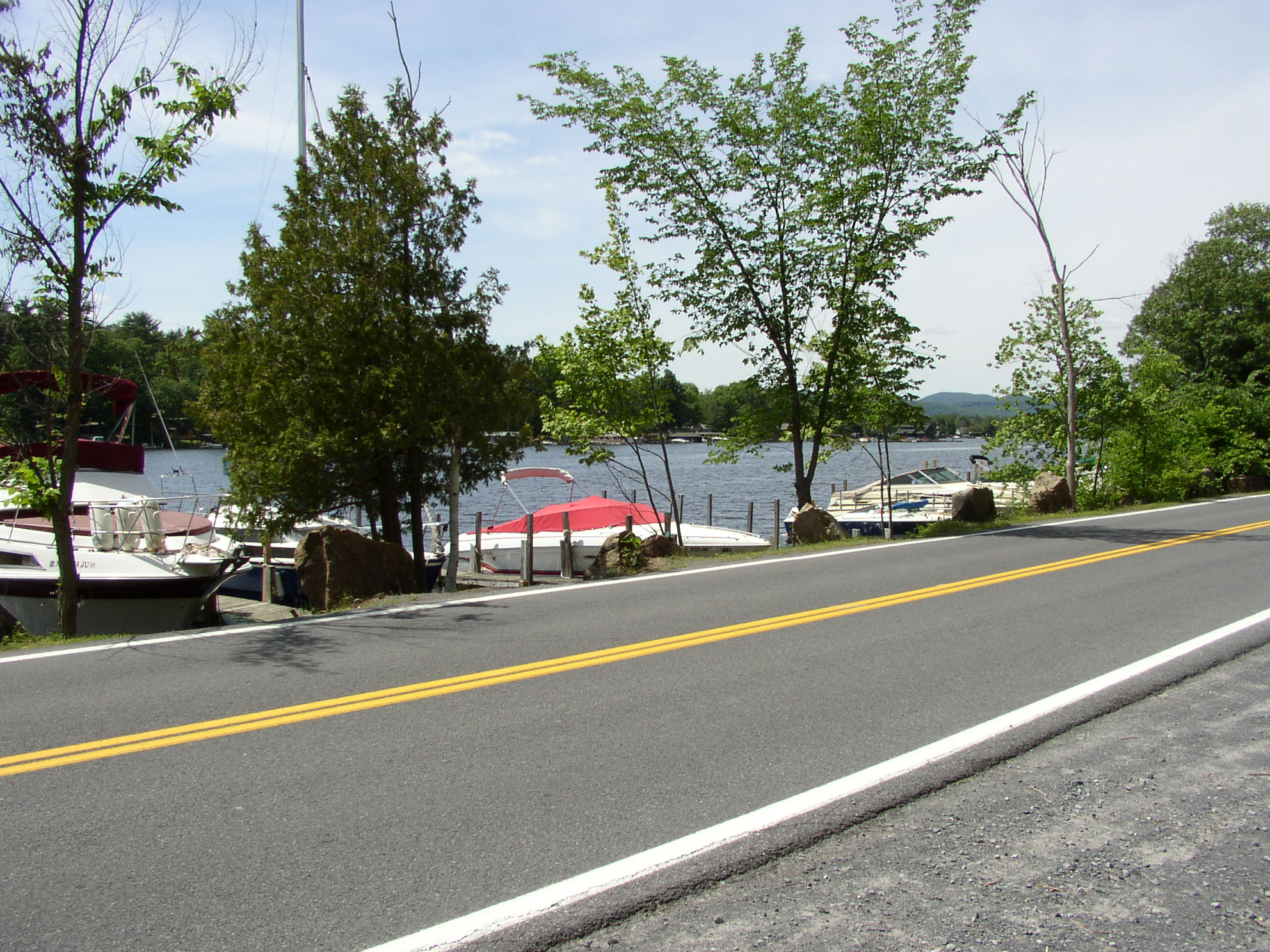
- View of Warner Bay of Lake George as seen across Pilot Knob Road

- Location within the state of New York
- Coordinates: 43°28′45″N 73°37′43″W
- Country: United States
- State: New York
- County: Warren/Washington
- Incorporation proposed: 2005, 2007, 2009
- Incorporation rejected: 2010

Area
  - Total: 4.5 sq mi (12 km^{2})
  - Land: 4.5 sq mi (12 km^{2})
  - Water: 0.0 sq mi (0 km^{2})

Population
  - Estimate (2009): 801
- Time zone: UTC-5 (Eastern (EST))
  - Summer (DST): UTC-4 (EDT)
- ZIP codes: 12804, 12820, 12844, 12845
- Area code: 518
- Website: villageofeastlakegeorge.org

East Lake George is a hamlet within the towns of Queensbury (in Warren County) and Fort Ann (in Washington County) in the U.S. state of New York. East Lake George attempted to incorporate as a village, a measure rejected by voters in 2010.

== History ==
In September 2005, a petition was submitted to the towns of Queensbury and Fort Ann, citing taxes, unfair assessments, and callous indifference from officials of both towns as reasons for village incorporation. The map of the proposed village was deemed invalid, halting the incorporation process. In 2007, a second petition was submitted but ruled legally insufficient because certain petition signatures were not dated. In March 2009, a third petition was submitted and subsequently rejected because there weren't enough signatures from Fort Ann residents. Additionally, the town supervisors stated that a number of signatures appeared more than once or were improperly witnessed. It was noted that the petition did meet all of the requirements of the New York State Village Law, however, with respect to Queensbury's section of the proposed village. According to the Village Incorporation Committee spokesperson, a lawsuit was filed against the towns for the supervisors' refusal to approve the petition based on their interpretation of what constitutes a 'resident'.

In a Supreme Court hearing, Supervisor Gayle Hall of Fort Ann maintained that she rejected the petition because it required but failed to contain the signatures of 20% of the Town of Fort Ann's qualified voters who live within the proposed territory. The court did not subscribe to Hall's interpretation of the law, instead supporting the petitioners' assertion that the petition need only contain 20% of the signatures from the registered voters within the territory as a whole. Even so, the court noted that the petition did in fact meet the requirements of the law based on Hall's incorrect interpretation. Hall also rejected the signatures of nine residents, saying they were not residents of the town. The petitioners alleged that the persons in question were residents at the time of signing, and cited case law from the Third Department of The Appellate Division. The court supported the petitioners in this argument as well.

Calling the supervisors' rejection of the petition "arbitrary and capricious", the state Supreme Court justice ruled that the supervisors' determination be reversed, and that an election be held as to the question of incorporation. For incorporation to succeed, proposed village residents from both Queensbury and Fort Ann would need to approve the proposal.

The election was held on August 26, 2010, with the town supervisors serving as election inspectors. Voters rejected the proposed incorporation 370 to 189.

Voting results	Against	For	Void
Queensbury portion	277	135	5
Fort Ann portion	93	54	0
Total	370	189	5

== Geography ==
The hamlet is entirely located within the Adirondack Park. It is situated along the southeastern shores of Lake George. The territory of the proposed East Lake George village would have included all land north of New York State Route 9L between its westernmost point at the Queensbury-Lake George town line at Plum Point and east to Warner Bay. Some land south of Route 9L — such as in the vicinity of Joshua Rock, Dunhams Bay, and between Harris and Warner Bays — would also have been part of the village. The area along Pilot Knob Road from Route 9L northward until Point Comfort were also to have been included. East Lake George village would have encompassed approximately 4.5 square miles (12 km^{2}) of land.

== Demographics ==
Firm demographics specific to this community are not available, as its incorporation was not proposed until after the 2000 census. The hamlet does not lie within a census-designated place.

Court documents indicate the number of alleged residents to be 801 in 2009, with the number of non-seasonal residents estimated to be 700 in 2005.
