= National Register of Historic Places listings in Switzerland County, Indiana =

Location of Switzerland County in Indiana

This is a list of the National Register of Historic Places listings in Switzerland County, Indiana.

This is intended to be a complete list of the properties on the National Register of Historic Places in Switzerland County, Indiana, United States. Latitude and longitude coordinates are provided for many National Register properties; these locations may be seen together in a map.

There are nine properties listed on the National Register in the county.

Properties and districts located in incorporated areas display the name of the municipality, while properties and districts in unincorporated areas display the name of their civil township. Properties and districts split between multiple jurisdictions display the names of all jurisdictions.

This National Park Service list is complete through NPS recent listings posted February 13, 2026.

== Current listings ==
	Name on the Register	Image	Date listed	Location	City or town	Description
1	Edward and George Cary Eggleston House	Edward and George Cary Eggleston House	October 15, 1973 (#73000046)	306 W. Main St. 38°44′46″N 85°04′11″W	Vevay	
2	Merit-Tandy Farmstead	Merit-Tandy Farmstead	April 29, 1977 (#77000021)	Northeast of Patriot on State Road 156; 38°52′05″N 84°47′35″W	Posey Township	
3	Old Hoosier Theatre	Old Hoosier Theatre	March 1, 1982 (#82000077)	Cheapside and Ferry Sts. 38°44′50″N 85°04′01″W	Vevay	
4	Benjamin Schenck Mansion	Benjamin Schenck Mansion	October 16, 2002 (#02001174)	206 W. Turnpike St. 38°45′02″N 85°04′24″W	Vevay	
5	Switzerland County Courthouse	Switzerland County Courthouse	June 17, 2009 (#09000435)	212 W. Main St. 38°44′49″N 85°04′08″W	Vevay	
6	Thiebaud Farmstead	Thiebaud Farmstead	June 22, 2004 (#04000629)	531 State Road 56, southwest of Vevay; 38°42′59″N 85°06′58″W	Craig Township	
7	Venoge Farmstead	Venoge Farmstead	January 2, 1997 (#96001539)	111 State Road 129, west of Vevay; 38°44′42″N 85°05′49″W	Craig Township	
8	Vevay Historic District		December 2, 2019 (#100004722)	Roughly bounded by Seminary St., Market St., Arch St., Pearl St. & Main St. 38°44′55″N 85°04′06″W	Vevay	
9	Thomas T. Wright House	Thomas T. Wright House	December 10, 1980 (#80000066)	Southwest of Vevay on State Road 56; 38°42′43″N 85°07′26″W	Craig Township	

== See also ==
- List of National Historic Landmarks in Indiana
- National Register of Historic Places listings in Indiana
- Listings in neighboring counties: Carroll (KY), Gallatin (KY), Jefferson, Ohio, Ripley
- List of Indiana state historical markers in Switzerland County
