= The Hoosier Schoolmaster =

The Hoosier Schoolmaster may refer to:

- The Hoosier Schoolmaster (novel), an 1871 novel by Edward Eggleston
- The Hoosier Schoolmaster (1914 film), an American film directed by Edwin August and Max Figman
- The Hoosier Schoolmaster (1924 film), an American film directed by Oliver L. Sellers
- The Hoosier Schoolmaster (1935 film), a 1935 adaptation of Eggleston's novel, directed by Lewis D. Collins
