= List of Indiana state historical markers in Switzerland County =

Location of Switzerland County in Indiana

This is a list of the Indiana state historical markers in Switzerland County.

This is intended to be a complete list of the official state historical markers placed in Switzerland County, Indiana, United States by the Indiana Historical Bureau. The locations of the historical markers and their latitude and longitude coordinates are included below when available, along with their names, years of placement, and topics as recorded by the Historical Bureau. There are 4 historical markers located in Switzerland County.

== Historical markers ==
Marker title	Image	Year placed	Location	Topics
Birthplace John Shaw Billings, M.D. April 12, 1838 - March 11, 1913		1966	Southwestern corner of the junction of State Road 250 and Lake Geneva Road at Allendale Village, west of East Enterprise and south of Allensville; 38°52′22.6″N 85°1′13.4″W	Science, Medicine, and Inventions, Military
Dr. Elwood Mead (1858–1936)		1980	Northeastern corner of the junction of State Roads 156 and 250, one block west of the Ohio River in Patriot; 38°50′18″N 84°49′36.6″W	Science, Medicine, and Inventions, Nature and Natural Disasters
Dr. John Shaw Billings		2018	SR 250 and Allensville Rd., northwest corner, Allensville; 38°52′23.5″N 85°01′13.1″W	Science, Medicine, & Invention; Education & Library; Buildings & Architecture
Thiebaud Farmstead		2022	5147 E. State Hwy 56, Vevay; 38°42′56.5″N 85°07′00″W	Agriculture; Immigration & Ethnic Group

== See also ==
- List of Indiana state historical markers
- National Register of Historic Places listings in Switzerland County, Indiana
