= Braytown =

Braytown may refer to:

- Braytown, Dorset
- Braytown, Indiana
- Braytown, Tennessee
