= American Agriculturist =

American magazine

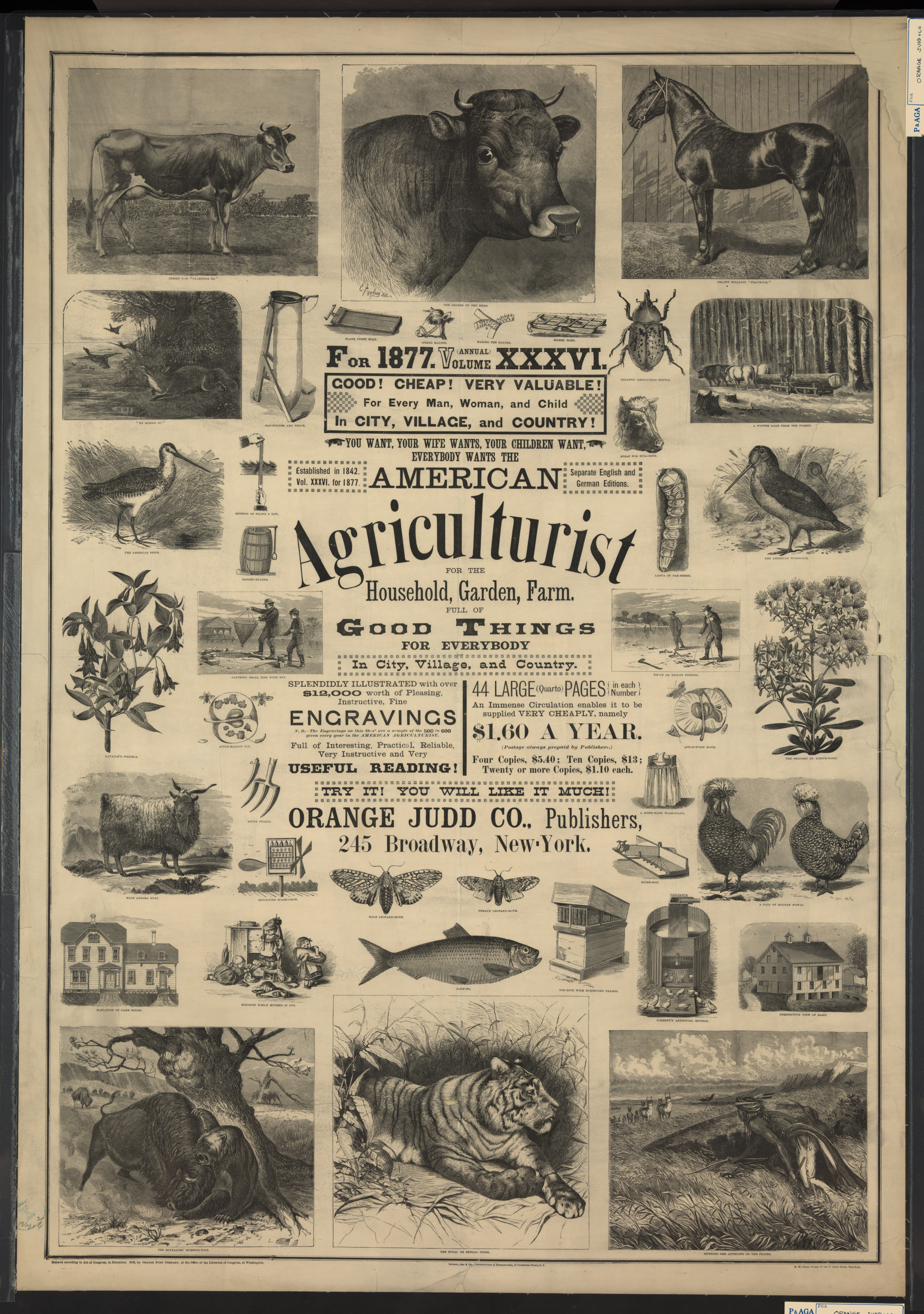
American Agriculturist edition from 1876

American Agriculturist is an agricultural publication for farm, home, and garden in the United States, previously published in English and German editions. Its subtitle varied over time: for the Farm, Garden, and Household (1869), for the Household, Garden, Farm (1877). It often included the tag-line Full of Good Things for Everybody, in City, Village, and Country (1877), etc. Solon Robinson was one of its writers. It was illustrated by numerous engravings. In 1885, it published a Family Cyclopaedia. In 1889, it published The Illustrated Dictionary of Gardening: A Practical and Scientific Encyclopedia of Horticulture for Gardeners and Botanists, (in 4 Volumes), which was edited by George Nicholson, This became the basis of the RHS's Dictionary of Gardening.

The publication is currently owned by Farm Progress.

== History ==
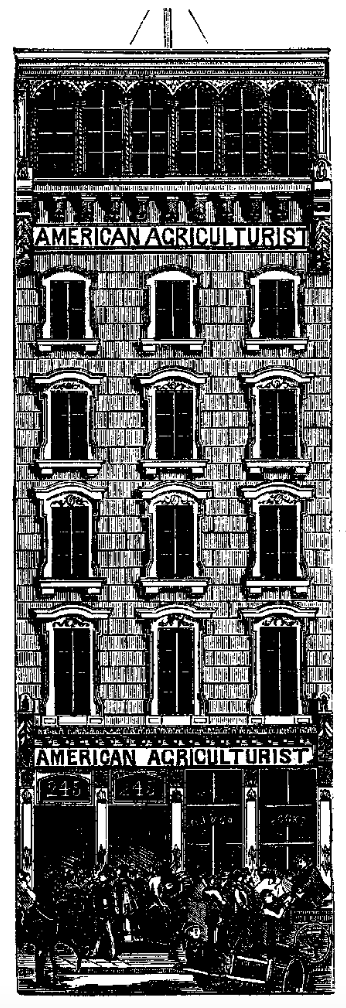
Building of the American Agriculturist

It was founded by Anthony B. Allen and his brother Richard L. Allen. It was published in 1843 by Saxton & Miles in New York City. In 1856 it was taken over by Orange Judd and became a publication of the Orange Judd Company. The publication absorbed several others and was eventually published in Springfield, Massachusetts. Originally monthly it became a weekly publication.

A German language edition for immigrants and 5 regional editions were established. Advertisers included cabinet organ, melodeon, and other instrument companies, gelatin and blanc mange brands, cooking tool offerings such as horseradish graters, farm equipment including grist mills, seed and plant businesses, steam engines, wires, watches, washers, trusses, patent companies, cutters, book subscriptions, and Great American Tea Company notices. Columns exposing quackery were run and medical advertisements were prohibited.

Henry Morgenthau Jr. owned the paper by 1924.

== Staff ==
Romeyn Berry and Manly Miles also wrote for the paper. Joseph Harris (writer) also wrote for the paper.

== Bibliography ==
=== References ===
- American Agriculturist. ISSN 2155-126X; OCLC 5295229 (all editions), OCLC 7034022 (all editions).
1. Title Page: American Agriculturist. Vol. 1, no. 1 (April 1842) – Vol. 1, no. 12 (March 1843).
  1. Via Google Books (Michigan).
2. "Our Great Present – American Agriculturist Family Cyclopædia" (advertisement). Vol. 43, no. 11, New Series no. 454. Geo. A. Peters. November 1884.
  1. Via Google Books (Harvard).
- Levy, Herbert (May 25, 2010). Henry Morgenthau, Jr.: The Remarkable Life of FDR's Secretary of the Treasury. Skyhorse Publishing Inc. ISBN 978-1-6023-9971-6.
1. Via Google Books (limited preview).
