= George Brown Goode =

American ichthyologist and museum administrator

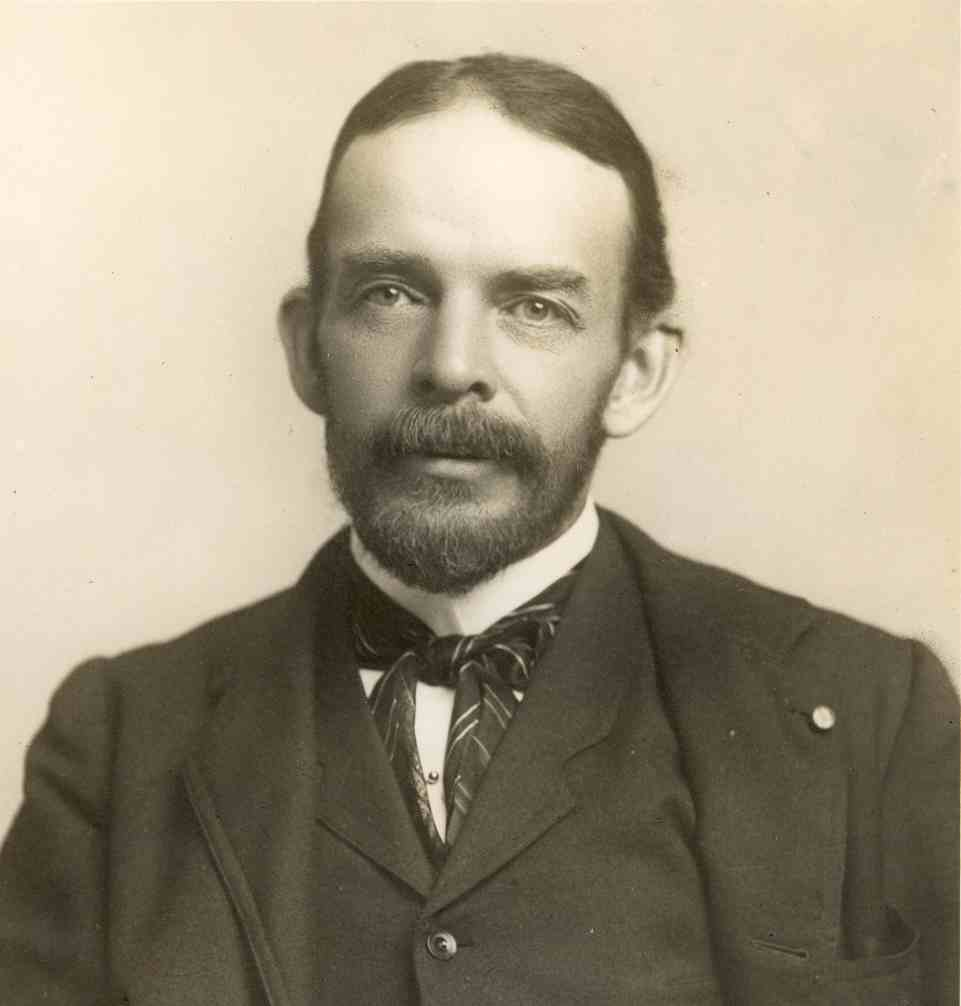
- Born: February 13, 1851; New Albany, Indiana, U.S.
- Died: September 6, 1896 (aged 45); Washington, D.C., U.S.
- Resting place: Oak Hill Cemetery; Washington, D.C., U.S.
- Education: Harvard University; Wesleyan University
- Spouse: Sarah Ford Judd (m. 1877)
- Children: 4
- Scientific career
- Fields: Ichthyology, museology
- Workplaces: Biological Society of Washington, Smithsonian Institution

George Brown Goode (February 13, 1851 – September 6, 1896), was an American ichthyologist and museum administrator.

== Early life and family ==
George Brown Goode was born February 13, 1851, in New Albany, Indiana, to Francis Collier Goode and Sarah Woodruff Crane Goode. He spent his childhood in Cincinnati, Ohio and Amenia, New York. He married Sarah Ford Judd on November 29, 1877. She was the daughter of Orange Judd, a prominent agricultural writer. Together, they had four children: Margaret Judd, Kenneth Mackarness, Francis Collier, and Philip Burwell. He graduated from Wesleyan University and studied at Harvard University.

In addition to his scientific publications, Goode wrote Virginia Cousins: A Study of the Ancestry and Posterity of John Goode of Whitbywhere he traced his ancestry back to John Goode, a 17th-century colonist from Whitby.

== Career ==
In 1872, Goode started working with Spencer Baird, soon becoming his trusted assistant. While working with Baird, Goode led research sponsored by the United States Fish Commission, and oversaw many Smithsonian displays and exhibitions, for the museum itself and for expositions around the world; Goode's first of these were the preparations for the Philadelphia Centennial Exposition, for which the Smithsonian was responsible for all the government displays. He also served as the assistant secretary of the Smithsonian Institution in charge of the United States National Museum.

Goode effectively ran both the fish research program of the U.S. Fish Commission and the Smithsonian Institution from 1873 to 1887. He was the United States Commissioner for Fish and Fisheries from 1887 to 1888. He authored many books and monographs and wrote more than 100 scientific reports and notes.

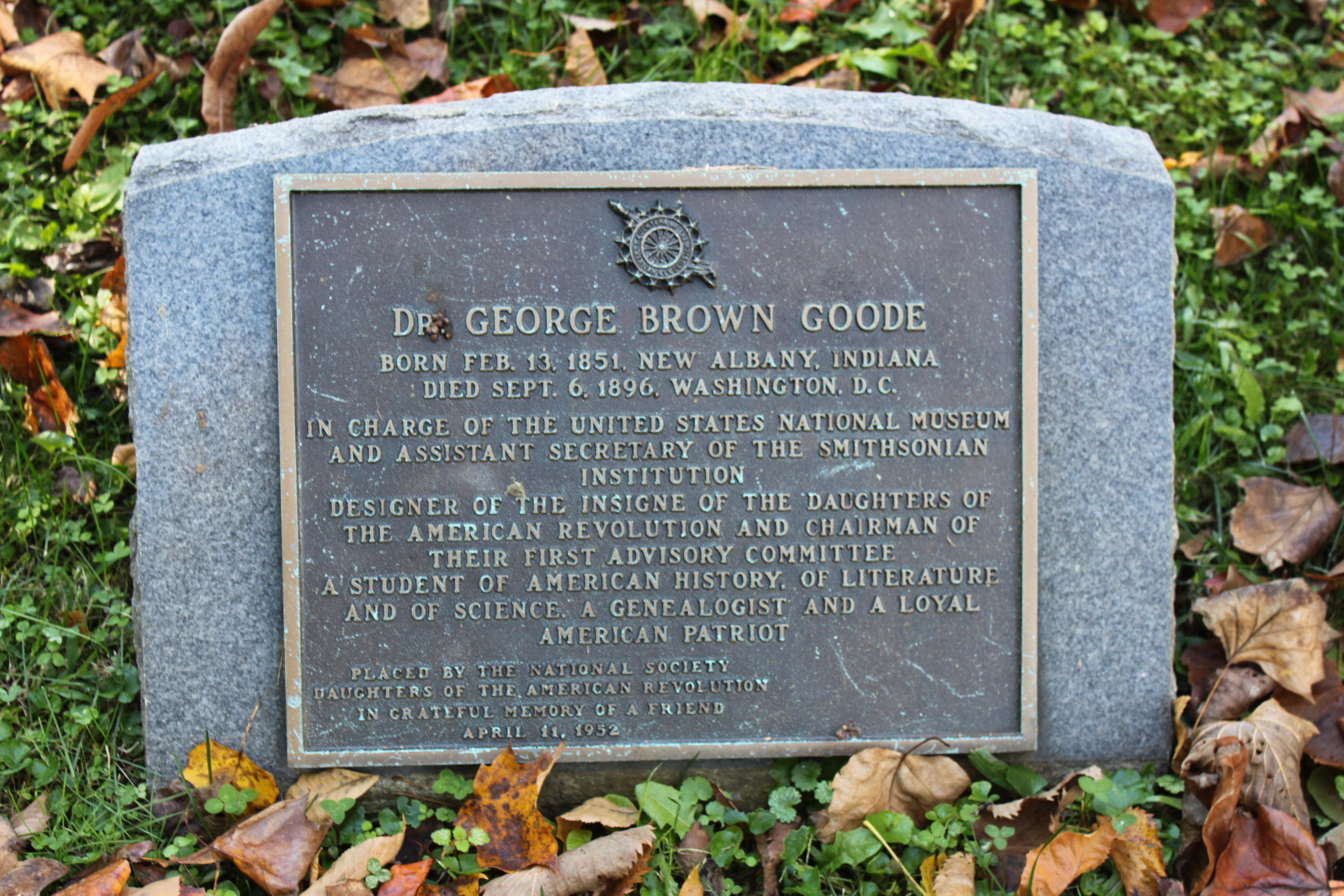
Grave of Goode at Oak Hill Cemetery

Goode was a member of the National Academy of Sciences, the American Academy of Arts and Sciences, and the American Philosophical Society. He received from the Queen Regent of Spain the decoration of Commander in the Order of Isabella the Catholic. He also was awarded the degree of Ph.D. from Indiana University and that of LL.D. from Wesleyan University. In 1891, he designed the official insignia for the Daughters of the American Revolution, of which his wife Sarah was a member. In 1893, he served as president of the Philosophical Society of Washington. He died at Lanier Heights in Washington, D.C., on September 6, 1896, at the age of only 45, after a bout with pneumonia. He had been at work on a history of the Smithsonian's first fifty years, which were being celebrated in 1896. The then head of the Smithsonian, Samuel Pierpont Langley, completed the volume and wrote a memorial to Goode, published in 1901. He was buried at Oak Hill Cemetery in Washington, D.C.

== Eponymy ==
The genus Goodea of splitfins was named in his honour by David Starr Jordan in 1880; this in turn gave his name to the family Goodeidae.

Species named after him include:

- Bluefin killifish, Lucania goodei Jordan, 1880
- Southern eagle ray, Myliobatis goodei Garman, 1885
- Goode croaker, Paralonchurus goodei Gilbert, 1898
- Goode's desert horned lizard, Phrynosoma goodei Stejneger, 1893
- Quillfish, Ptilichthys goodei Bean, 1881
- Chilipepper, Sebastes goodei (C.H. Eigenmann & R.S. Eigenmann, 1890)
- Palometa, Trachinotus goodei Jordan & Evermann, 1896

== Bibliography ==
Ichthyology and fisheries

- Goode, George Brown, & Tarleton Hoffman Bean. "Oceanic Ichthyology, A Treatise on the Deep-Sea and Pelagic Fishes of the World, Based Chiefly upon the Collections Made by the Steamers Blake, Albatross, and Fish Hawk in the Northwestern Atlantic (Washington, 1896)". National Oceanic and Atmospheric Administration. Archived from the original on 5 November 2005.
- The Fisheries and Fishery Industries of the United States, 7 volumes. (Washington, 1884–1887)
- American Fishes; a Popular Treatise upon the Game and Food Fishes of North America, with Especial Reference to Habits and Methods of Capture (New York, 1888)

Museums

- "Museum-History and Museums of History"
- "The Museums of the Future"
- "The Principles of Museum Administration"

(All are available in A Memorial of George Brown Goode)

== See also ==
- Category:Taxa named by George Brown Goode
- "The New Museum Idea"
