= Dolores Bacon =

American novelist (1870–1934)

- Born: November 20, 1870; Atchison, Kansas
- Died: June 3, 1934 (aged 63); New York City, New York
- Occupations: Writer, reporter, actress, and playwright

Dolores Bacon (November 20, 1870 – June 3, 1934) was an American writer, reporter, actress, and playwright. She is best known as an author of children's books and for her work as a reporter for Joseph Pulitzer's New York World.

== Early life ==
Bacon was born Mary Schell Hoke in Atchison, Kansas. Her father, Jacob Schell Hoke (1845-1879), a merchant and member of the town council, had a shootout with a man named William Marbourg on July 13, 1873, over Marbourg's attentions to Hoke's wife, Amarillas (Carter) (or "Amma"). Hoke was fined a dollar over the shooting, but his wife fled with Mary. Hoke tracked his wife to Brooklyn and a trial ensued, with the result being that Amma retained custody. The couple divorced soon afterwards. In December 1874, a jury decided in favor of Marbourg in a lawsuit filed by Hoke and Amma married Marbourg in January 1876. The couple returned to Atchison to live, while Hoke went to live in Kansas City and died there in 1879. Bacon appears to have retained her birth name of "Hoke" until her marriage, but used "Dolores Marbourg" as a pseudonym as an adult. Bacon was given early training in music in New York and in France. In 1886-7, she was on the stage, in the company of Frank M. Mayo.

== Literary career ==
She then took up reporting, acting as a correspondent for the New York World in Europe (1889) and elsewhere. An 1893 exposee in which she posed as a flower-girl on the streets of New York City attracted particular attention. In 1901-1902, she was a special writer for the Sunday Times. She later contributed short stories to magazines such as All Story and Munsey's Magazine, and became an author, publishing both fiction and non-fiction for children and adults. Her works were reviewed in major magazines such as The Nation and The Outlook.

== Personal life ==
She married Charles E. Bacon in New York City on October 1, 1898. They had at least three children, including a son named Charles and two daughters. She wrote a book, "Crumbs and His Times" (1906) about the first seven years of his life and her advice for parents based on it. She died in New York on June 3, 1934.

== Works ==
- Works by Dolores Bacon at Project Gutenberg

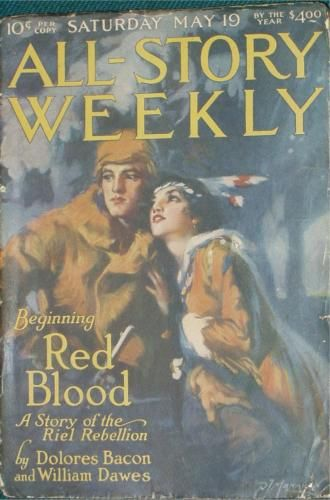
Cover of All Story Weekly, May 19, 1917, featuring a serialized novel by Dolores Bacon and William Dawes

- I'll Ne'er Consent (1888)
- Juggernaut: A Veiled Record (1891; with George Cary Eggleston)
- The Soul of a Woman (1897)
- A King's Favorite (comic play, 1902)
- The Diary of a Musician (1904)
- A King's Divinity (1906)
- Crumbs and His Times (1906)
- Old New England Churches and Their Children (1906)
- Songs Every Child Should Know (1906)
- Hymns Every Child Should Know (1907)
- In High Places (1907)
- Pictures Every Child Should Know (1908)
- Operas Every Child Should Know (1911)
- Red Blood: A Story of the Riel Rebellion (serialized in All Story Weekly May 19 – June 16, 1917; with William Dawes)
