= Manly Miles =

American physiologist and animal husbandry

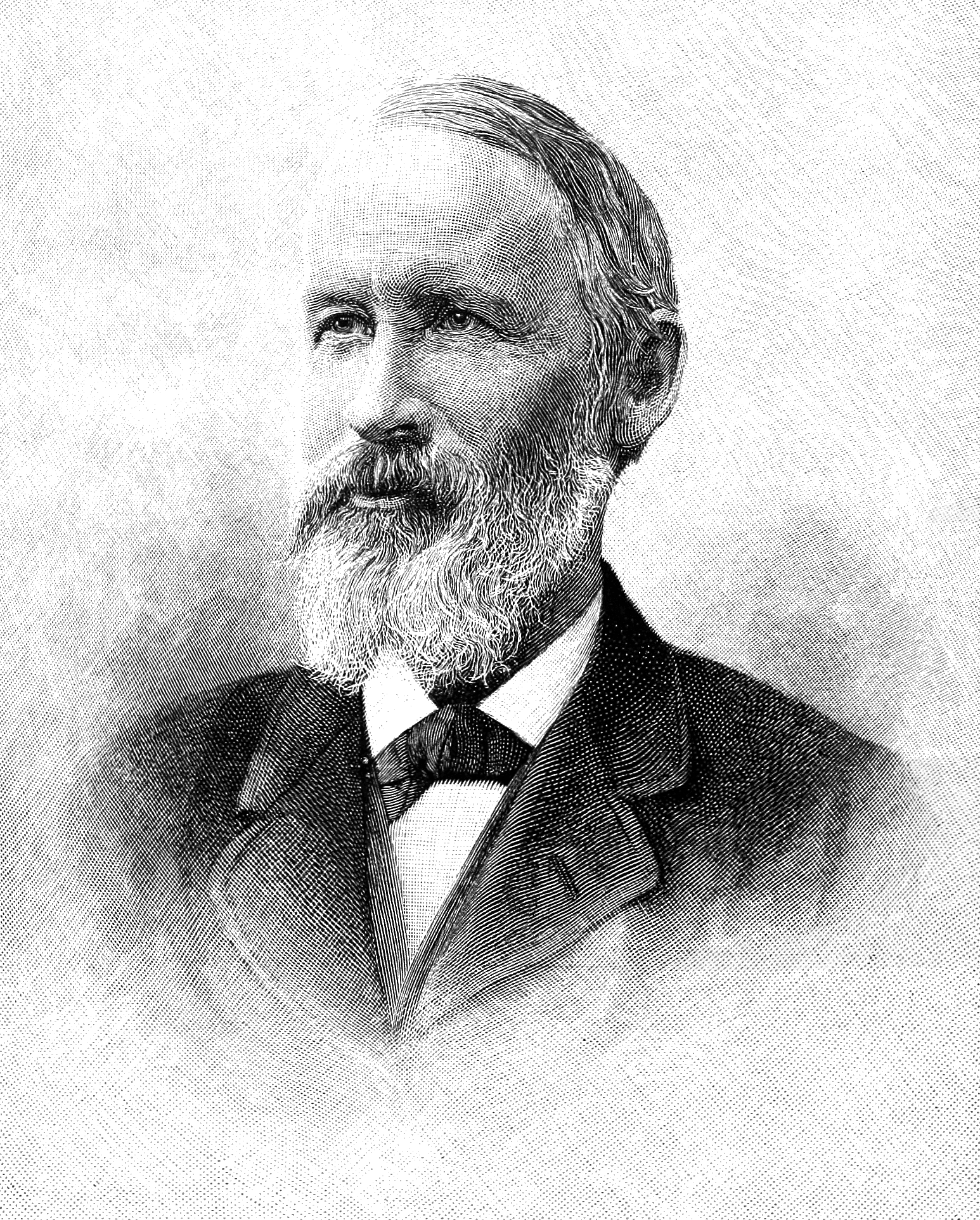
Dr. Manly Miles

Manly Miles (July 20, 1826 – February 15, 1898) was an American zoologist and agriculturalist.

Manly Miles was born at Homer, New York, the son of Manly Miles, a soldier of the Revolution, and Mary Cushman, a lineal descendant of Miles Standish. In 1837 his family moved to Flint, Michigan, where he worked on the farm, to his common school education adding reading and study during spare moments. In 1850 he graduated M.D. from Rush Medical College, Chicago, and practiced in Flint until 1859, when he was appointed by Governor Moses Wisner assistant state geologist in the department of zoology. In 1860 he was appointed professor of animal physiology and zoology in the Michigan State Agricultural College at East Lansing. While in the zoological department of the Geological State Survey he was in constant correspondence with the leading naturalists of the period, as Agassiz, Cope, Lea, and discovered two new shells, two others being named after him by Lea. His catalogue was by far the most complete of any then compiled. In 1864 the duties of "acting superintendent of the farm" were added to his chair while in 1865 he became professor of animal physiology and practical agriculture and also farm superintendent. In 1869 he ceased to teach physiology, devoting his entire time to practical agriculture, being far ahead of his time. In 1875 he resigned to accept the professorship of agriculture in the University of Illinois. Later he moved to Houghton Farm, near Mountainville, New York, and devoted himself entirely to scientific experiments, though afterwards he accepted the professorship of agriculture in the Massachusetts Agricultural College at Amherst (now the University of Massachusetts Amherst). In 1886 he returned to Lansing to investigate, study and write until his death.

Among his appointments and memberships were: membership in the Michigan State Medical Society; member of the Buffalo Society of Natural Science; of the Entomological Society of Philadelphia, Pennsylvania; fellow of the Royal Microscopical Society, and of the American Association for the Advancement of Science. Dr. R. C. Kedzie, who entered the Agricultural College two years later than Miles, said that he found "Dr. Miles an authority among both professors and students, on birds, beasts, reptiles, stones of the fields and insects of the air." To his death he retained his habits of investigation and study, though his great deafness rendered his public work difficult. Miles was the first professor of practical agriculture in the United States. On February 15, 1851, he married Mary E. Dodge, of Lansing, Michigan, who survived him. Manly Miles died at Lansing, Michigan, February 15, 1898, from fatty degeneration of the heart. He was a constant writer and advisor of the American Agriculturalist and wrote many books on practical agriculture.
