= Lamb, Indiana =

- Unincorporated community and Census-designated place
- Location within Indiana Location within the United States
- Coordinates: 38°41′31″N 85°11′17″W
- Country: United States
- State: Indiana
- County: Switzerland
- Township: Craig
- Elevation: 482 ft (147 m)
- Time zone: UTC-5 (Eastern (EST))
  - Summer (DST): UTC-4 (EDT)
- ZIP code: 47043
- Area codes: 812, 930
- GNIS feature ID: 2830556

Lamb is an unincorporated community in Craig Township, Switzerland County, in the U.S. state of Indiana.

== History ==
An early variant name of the community was called Erin. Erin had its start in 1815. A post office called Lamb was established in 1882, and remained in operation until it was discontinued in 1907.

== Demographics ==
The United States Census Bureau delineated Lamb as a census designated place in the 2022 American Community Survey.
