= Thomas T. Wright House =

Historic house in Indiana, United States

- U.S. National Register of Historic Places
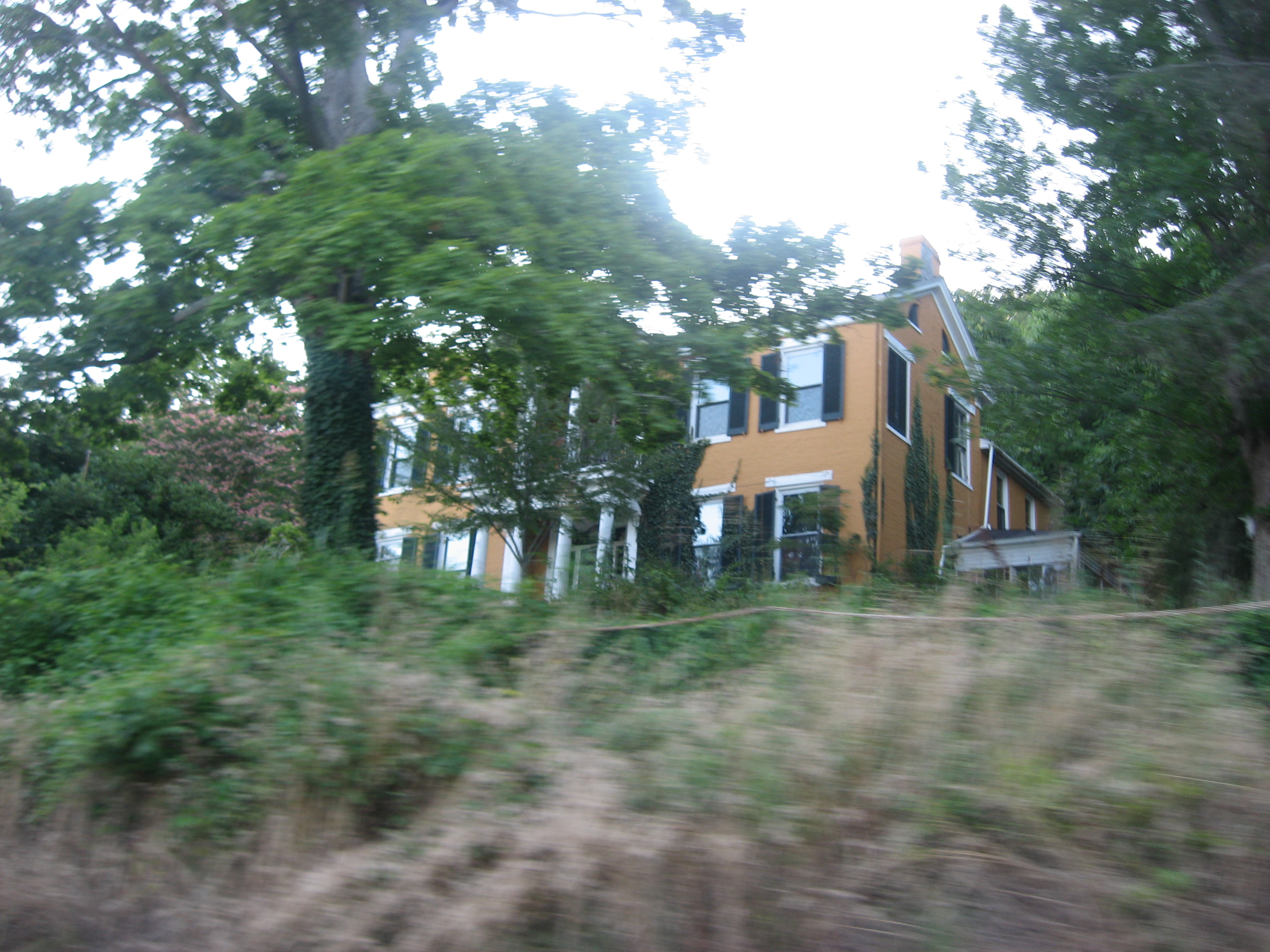
- Thomas T. Wright House, June 2012

- Location within Indiana Location within the United States
- Location: Southwest of Vevay on State Road 56, Craig Township, Switzerland County, Indiana
- Coordinates: 38°42′43″N 85°7′25″W
- Area: 2 acres (0.81 ha)
- Built: 1838
- Built by: Kyle, George
- Architectural style: Greek Revival
- NRHP reference No.: 80000066
- Added to NRHP: December 10, 1980

Thomas T. Wright House, also known as the Old Hildreth Home, is a historic house located in Craig Township, Switzerland County, Indiana. The house is situated on a hill overlooking the Ohio River. It was built in 1838, and is a two-story, five-bay, Greek Revival style brick dwelling with later additions. It features a two-tier front portico supported by Doric order columns.

It was listed on the National Register of Historic Places in 1980.
