= Will Henry Stevens =

American painter

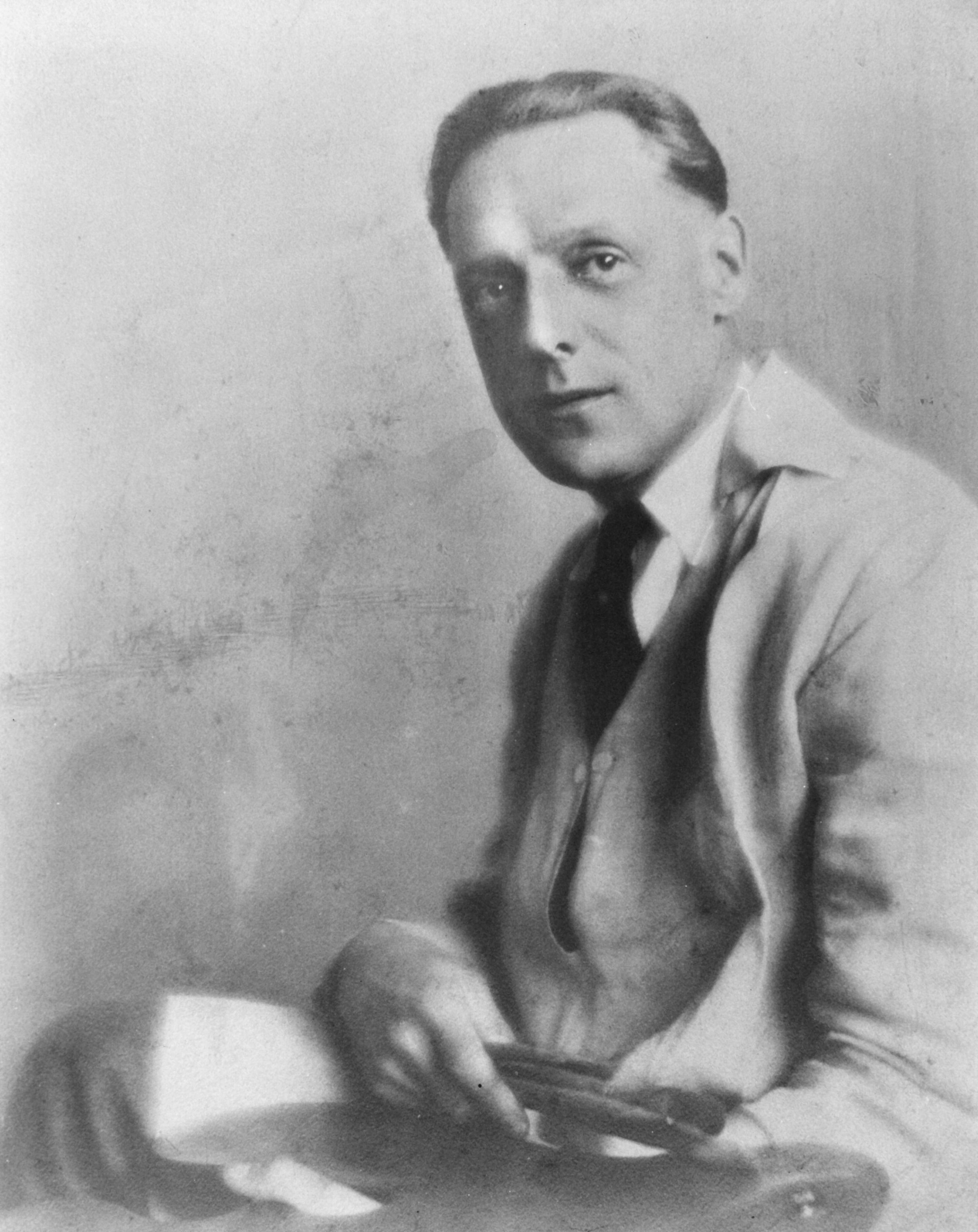
- Stevens circa 1923, New Orleans
- Born: November 28, 1881; Vevay, Indiana, U.S.
- Died: August 25, 1949 (aged 67)
- Education: Cincinnati Art Academy
- Occupations: Modernist painter and naturalist
- Known for: paintings and pastels of rural Southern landscape, abstractions of nature, and non-objective works

Will Henry Stevens (November 28, 1881 – August 25, 1949) was an American modernist painter and naturalist. Stevens is known for his paintings and tonal pastels depicting the rural Southern landscape, abstractions of nature, and non-objective works. His paintings are in the collections of over forty museums in the US, including the Ogden Museum of Southern Art, the Museum of Fine Arts Boston, the North Carolina Museum of Art, the Los Angeles County Museum of Art, and the Smithsonian American Art Museum.

== Life ==
Will Henry Stevens was born in Vevay, Indiana, a town along the Ohio River. His father was an apothecary and taught Stevens the elements of chemistry and techniques of emulsions, which were later to play a large part in Stevens' experiments with different media. Working with his father, Stevens learned to grind and mix his own paints, skills which later enabled him to develop new formulas for pastel chalks.

Stevens studied at the Cincinnati Art Academy for three years before leaving the academy to begin working at the Rookwood Pottery as a painter/designer beginning in 1904. While there, Stevens met his wife, Grace Hall, a fellow designer. In 1906, Stevens made the first of many visits to New York. He studied for a while at the Art Students League, but was dissatisfied by the classroom style of William Merritt Chase, and soon dropped out. Stevens was featured in several exhibitions at the New Gallery on 30th Street, which displayed an active interest in the more contemporary art movements under the guidance of its owner, Mary Beacon Ford. At the New Gallery, Stevens met and received the encouragement of Jonas Lie, Van Dearing Perrine, and Albert Pinkham Ryder. Stevens received his first one-man exhibition at the New Gallery in March 1907. Ryder was pleased with the work and asked to meet the artist. Walking around the gallery with Stevens, Ryder commented, “Now remember, you are a poet. Don’t go do what so many painters are doing today—painting out before nature all the time. Just walk out in the pleasant time of the evening.”

Stevens took a teaching position in Louisville, KY around 1912 and remained there for nearly a decade. He exhibited regionally, and by the early 1920s had shown in New York, Philadelphia, Chicago, St. Louis, Cincinnati, Cleveland, Pittsburgh, Indianapolis, and New Orleans. For many years, Stevens made annual trips to New York to keep in touch with colleagues and stay abreast of contemporary art. He also spent every summer in the mountains of North Carolina, teaching summer classes and painting the woods and hillsides. In 1921, he was invited to join the faculty of Newcomb College in New Orleans where he remained until his retirement in 1948. As in New York, Stevens quickly became part of a community of painters and writers, through which Stevens maintained an active contact with a wide range of ideas and cultural changes, while still quietly pursuing his own idiosyncratic path.

== Innovator ==
Because of his year-round commitments to Newcomb and various summer schools, Stevens was not able to spend extended lengths of time in the studio. This suited his propensity to wander, work, and teach out-of-doors, and he began to rely on media and methods that encouraged spontaneity. Most of his works were achieved on modestly scaled paper, which could be transported easily and worked on site. The proliferation of modernist issues, occurred coincidentally with Stevens moving away from studio-oriented easel painting and toward the use of more versatile materials and gestural techniques. His reliance on drawing, with charcoal, pastel, and watercolor, led him naturally to place greater importance on the graphic structure of his composition. This new direction also revived Stevens’ earlier interest in Song painting, and its underlying philosophy of the artist as an extension of nature. He began to experiment with a pastel medium of his own invention, which would also be conducive to a freer creative process. Stevens developed formulas for a fixative and binder, and a whole sequence of emulsions, from tempera with egg and oil to wax, which made his pastel pigments colorfast and virtually unsmudgeable. He used these in such a range of combinations that they are today almost impossible to distinguish. But perhaps his most interesting technical innovation was to allow random strokes and blots of color to float onto and penetrate a prepared wet paper, thus defining of themselves the starting point for the emergence of the final image—this independently of the experiments with accident and chance of the Dada and Surrealist painters His style had become characterized by the direct, gestural application of lines and tones, which were energized by clusters of flickering color notations. This visual shorthand had parallels with some of the most advanced techniques of his day.

== Influences ==
As an artist, Stevens' interest in nature as subject matter was inspired by his well-documented enthusiasm for the writings of Ralph Waldo Emerson, Henry David Thoreau and Walt Whitman. During his years at the Cincinnati Art Academy, Stevens recalled little he liked except the subtly abstracted works of the Impressionist John Henry Twactman, whose influence is apparent in Stevens’ early landscapes. Other influences at that time included James Abbott McNeill Whistler. During a trip to Washington, D.C. in the early 1900s, Stevens discovered an exhibition of Chinese paintings on silk from the Song (Sung) dynasty at the Freer Gallery. Stevens admired their abstract qualities. Regarding the bold black and white linearity, rendered with authority on such a tentative, soft ground, Stevens remarked, "I could not look at Sung without realizing that it had the same kind of philosophy that I had discovered in Whitman." Stevens clearly experienced in the Sung aspect of oriental art that which the impressionists found in Japanese prints, an affirmation of the two-dimensionality of the picture plane. Art historian, Jessie Poesch wrote that, "the selection by the Sung artists of the salient essences of forms, rather than the explicit and detailed delineation of them, obviously appealed to Stevens, as did, apparently, the sense of line on the surface, the network of lines and forms that suggested distance, rather than clearly defined sense of recession found in most western painting up to the early twentieth century. Seeking more information on Oriental Art and philosophy, Stevens eventually came to the teachings of Lao-Tzu, in which Stevens saw creative parallels to the poetry of Walt Whitman. What Stevens felt all of these diverse sources held in common was an attitude toward the world, summed up in Stevens' own statement, "The best thing a human can do in life is to get rid of his separateness or selfness and hand himself over to the nature of things—to this mysterious thing called the Universal Order, that any artist must sense...In human nature we are consciously trying to achieve an order. And we are distressed by it, by the task of patterning it on an Order that is not personal or human—that is what I call spiritual." In the late 1920s and early 1930s during visits to New York Stevens discovered the works of Wassily Kandinsky and Paul Klee. Their works, particularly, were a revelation, and confirmation of Stevens' own sense of aesthetic direction. Stevens began to work in a "non-objective" mode while he continued to produce his more "objective" landscapes. In a taped interview with Bernard Lemann, Stevens observed,"I do not draw a line between objective and non-objective (painting)...I am doing both and will continue to, so long as either seems vital to me."

== Legacy ==
Will Henry Stevens, No. 1438, pastel on paper

In 2006, Lynn Hill, great niece of Stevens, and John Cram, owner of Blue Spiral 1 gallery, who has managed the Stevens Estate for over thirty years, established the Will Henry Stevens Revolving Loan Fund. The Fund is a permanently endowed revolving loan fund assisting two regional land trusts, the Southern Appalachian Highlands Conservancy and the Conservation Trust for North Carolina, to protect significant land and rivers in Western North Carolina. It enables the groups to respond quickly to properties imminently threatened by development.

Originally built in the early 1800s and designated as New Hampshire's oldest covered bridge, the Bagley Covered Bridge crossed the Warner River until being carefully dismantled in 1966. It remained preserved in storage for 42 years and in February 2008, a gift was made to The Bascom Center for Visual Arts in Highlands, NC, by Dorothy and Jimmy Coleman and Dian and Tom Winindger in honor of the New Orleans Academy of Fine Arts. Rebuilt as the entrance to the Bascom and renamed the Will Henry Stevens Covered Bridge, it is made of old growth white pine. It is one lane, 14 feet wide, and 87-1/2 feet long.

In 2012, the Georgia Museum of Art presented a retrospective exhibition of Stevens' work.

Will Henry Stevens' estate is solely represented and managed by Blue Spiral 1 gallery in Asheville, North Carolina.

== Museum Collections ==
- Alexandria Museum of Art, LA
- Asheville Art Museum, NC
- The Bascom Center for the Visual Arts, Highlands, NC
- Birmingham Museum of Art, AL
- Memphis Brooks Museum of Art, Memphis, TN
- B. Carroll Reese Museum, Johnson City, TN
- Columbia Museum of Art, SC
- Dixon Gallery and Gardens, Memphis, TN
- Ewing Gallery, The University of Tennessee, Knoxville
- Georgia Museum of Art, Athens
- Gibbes Museum of Art, Charleston, SC
- Greenville County Museum of Art, SC
- Gregg Museum of Art and Design, North Carolina State University, Raleigh
- Hickory Museum of Art, NC
- High Museum of Art, Atlanta, GA
- The Historic New Orleans Collection, LA
- Hunter Museum of American Art, Chattanooga, TN
- Indianapolis Museum of Art, IN
- Indiana State Museum and Historic Sites, Indianapolis
- Knoxville Museum of Art, TN
- Lauren Rogers Museum of Art, Laurel, MS
- Los Angeles County Museum of Art, CA
- The Louise Wells Cameron Art Museum, Wilmington, NC
- Louisiana Art and Science Museum, Baton Rouge
- Louisiana State University Museum of Art, Baton Rouge
- Mint Museum of Art, Charlotte, NC
- Mississippi Museum of Art, Jackson, MS
- Montgomery Museum of Fine Arts, AL
- Morris Museum of Art, Augusta, GA
- Museum of Fine Arts, Boston, MA
- New Orleans Academy of Fine Arts, LA
- New Orleans Museum of Art, LA
- Newcomb Art Gallery, Tulane University, New Orleans, LA
- Newark Museum, NJ
- Norton Museum of Art, West Palm Beach, FL
- Ogden Museum of Southern Art, New Orleans, LA
- Smithsonian American Art Museum, Washington, DC
- Southern Highland Craft Guild, Asheville, NC
- Spartanburg Art Museum, SC
- Springville Museum of Art, UT
- Switzerland County Historical Society, Vevay, IN
- Taubman Museum of Art, Roanoke, VA
- Tennessee State Museum, Nashville
- Tulane University Collection, New Orleans, LA
- Virginia Museum of Fine Arts, Richmond, VA
- Frederick R. Weisman Art Museum, Minneapolis, MN

== Bibliography ==
- Chambers, Bruce W. (1984), Art and Artists of the South, The Robert P. Coggins Collection, University of South Carolina Press, ISBN 0-87249-432-2
- Lemann, Bernard (1947–48), Will Henry's Nature: The Pictorial Ideas of W.H. Stevens (cited as the major source for other books written on Stevens previously mentioned), Howard Tilton Memorial Library, Tulane University: unpublished manuscript
- Levin, Gail; Lorenz, Marianne (1992), Theme and Improvisation: Kandinsky & the American Avant-Garde, 1912–1950, Dayton Art Institute and Bullfinch Press, ISBN 0-8212-1921-9
- Poesch, Jessie (1983), Painting in the South: 1564–1980, Virginia Museum of Fine Arts, ISBN 0-917046-14-5
- Poesch, Jessie (1986), Will Henry Stevens – Modern Mystic; Beginnings to 1921, vol. XXV, The Southern Quarterly
- Pennington, Estill Curtis (1993), Will Henry Stevens, an eye transformed, a hand transforming—, Morris Museum of Art, ISBN 0-9618270-7-6
- Poesch, Jessie (1987), Will Henry Stevens, Library of Congress Catalog Card Number: 87-80811: Greenville County Museum of Art
