= The Hoosier Schoolmaster (1924 film) =

1924 film

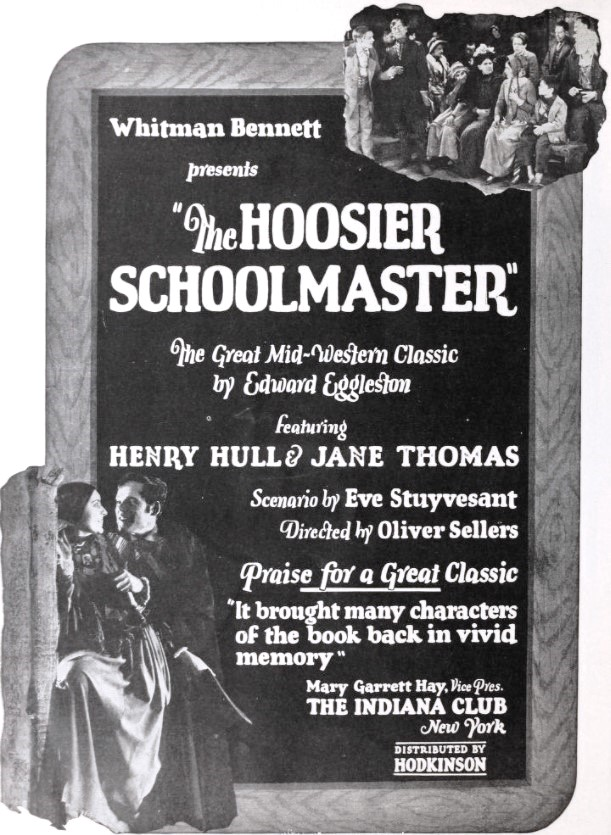
- Advertisement
- Directed by: Oliver L. Sellers
- Written by: Eve Stuyvesant
- Based on: The Hoosier Schoolmaster by Edward Eggleston
- Produced by: Whitman Bennett
- Starring: Henry Hull; Jane Thomas; Frank Dane
- Cinematography: Edward Paul
- Production company: Whitman Bennett Productions
- Distributed by: W. W. Hodkinson Corporation
- Release date: February 14, 1924 (U.S)
- Running time: 60 minutes
- Country: United States
- Language: Silent (English intertitles)

The Hoosier Schoolmaster is a 1924 American silent drama film directed by Oliver L. Sellers and starring Henry Hull, Jane Thomas, and Frank Dane. It is an adaptation of the novel The Hoosier Schoolmaster by Edward Eggleston. The film was remade as a post-Civil War talkie in 1935.

== Plot ==
As described in a film magazine review, during pre-Civil War days, Ralph Hartsook is the headmaster in the Flat Creek School District of Indiana. Hannah Thompson works for the family where Ralph boards. They fall in love. An epidemic of night robberies breaks out and Ralph is suspected of being the criminal. After a variety of adventures and with the aid of Bud Means, Ralph establishes his innocence, confounds his enemies, and weds Hannah.

== Cast ==
- Henry Hull as Ralph Hartsook
- Jane Thomas as Hannah Thompson
- Frank Dane as Dr. Small
- Mary Foy as Old Mis' Means
- Walter Palm as Old Jack Means
- Nat Pendleton as Bud Means
- Dorothy Allen as Mirandy Means
- G.W. Hall as Bill Means
- George Pelzer as Squire Hawkins
- Arthur Ludwig as Pete Jones
- Frank Andrews as John Pearson
- Harold McArthur as Walter Johnson
- Tom Brown as Shocky Thompson
- Adolf Link as Dutchy Snyder
- Jerry Sinclair as Prosecuting Attorney Bronson
- Dorothy Walters as Nancy Sawyer
- Dick Lee as Jeems Phillips

== Preservation ==
A print of The Hoosier Schoolmaster with one reel missing is held at the UCLA Film & Television Archive and Library of Congress.

== Bibliography ==
- Darby, William. Masters of Lens and Light: A Checklist of Major Cinematographers and Their Feature Films. Scarecrow Press, 1991. ISBN 0-8108-2454-X
