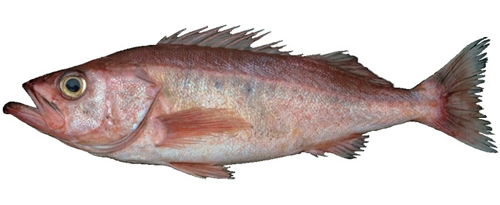

Scientific classification
- Kingdom: Animalia
- Phylum: Chordata
- Class: Actinopterygii
- Order: Perciformes
- Family: Scorpaenidae
- Genus: Sebastes
- Species: S. goodei

Binomial name
- Sebastes goodei (C. H. Eigenmann & R. S. Eigenmann, 1890)

Synonyms
- Sebastodes goodei Eigenmann & Eigenmann, 1890

= Sebastes goodei =

Species of fish

Sebastes goodei, the chilipepper rockfish and chilipepper, is a species of marine ray-finned fish belonging to the subfamily Sebastinae, the rockfishes, part of the family Scorpaenidae. This species lives mainly off the coast of western North America from Baja California to Vancouver.

== Taxonomy ==
Sebastes goodei was first formally described in 1890 as Sebastodes goodei by the American ichthyologists Carl H. Eigenmann and Rosa Smith Eigenmann with the type locality given as Point Loma, California. Some authorities classify this species in the subgenus Sebastodes. The specific name honors George Brown Goode, director of the United States National Museum.

== Description ==
The body of Sebastes goodei is slender and rather elongate. The head is elongate, pointed and with no spines; the lower jaw is projecting. The adult fish is generally pinkish-red becoming whitish below with pink fins. Juveniles are light olive on back. The middle of the chillipepper's side, the lateral line, stands out clearly, as a lighter, bright red zone. In comparison to the bocaccio, it has a smaller mouth with an upper jaw that extends only to about the center of the eye, not past it. Chilipeppers may live to be 35 years old. The record length is 22 inches (56 cm), and weight is 5.25 pounds.

== Distribution and habitat ==
Sebastes goodei is found in the eastern Pacific Ocean along the western coast of North America from Queen Charlotte Sound in British Columbia south to Magdalena Bay, Baja California Sur. The adults are demersal fish and can be found on rocky reefs, and also on sand and mud substrates in deepwater while the young are pelagic and live shallower water. The depth range of this species is 0 to 425 m (0 to 1,394 ft).

== Biology ==
Sebastes goodei adults are either solitary or live in small groups. They feed on krill, small squid and smaller fishes. Approximately 50 percent of the males mature when 8.75 inches long and 2 years old; while 50 percent of the females are mature when they are 12 inches long and 4 years old. Chili peppers may live to be at least 16 years old. As with other rockfishes, fertilization is internal and live young are born. The number of developing eggs increases from 29,000 in a 12-inch female to about 538,000 in a 22-inch fish. Rockfish have internal fertilization, eggs incubate and embryos hatch in the ovaries, with subsequent extrusion of larvae. These fishes have a lifespan of up to 35 years.

== Fisheries ==
Sebastes goodei is an important commercial target species in Californian waters and are taken mainly by hook and line, gill nets, and trawls. It is fished for by recreational fishermen but this activity seems to be decreasing. The chilipepper rockfish is considered to be an excellent food fish. In 1995 a total of more than 2,000 t (2,000 long tons; 2,200 short tons) was landed by commercial fisheries in California and Oregon but in 2006 this had fallen to 43.2 t (42.5 long tons; 47.6 short tons), although the population was estimated to have increased. The fall in landings is thought to be a result of reduced fishing effort due to conservation measures designed to protect the stocks of other rockfish species.

== Nutrition ==
Nutrition information for Sebastes goodei is as follows.

Serving Size	100g
=== Calories ===	91 kcal
=== Protein ===	20.3 g
Protein calories: 87 kcal Protein calories % : 94.8%	
=== Fat ===	0.5 g
Fat calories: 5 kcal Fat calories % : 5.2%	
=== Carbohydrate ===	0.0 g
Carbohydrate calories: 0 kcal Carbohydrate calories % : 0.0%	
Cholesterol	63.5 mg
Sodium	46.9 mg

Serving Size	per 100g	per 100 kcal
Omega 3 (EPA+DHA)	229 mg	256 mg
Vitamin B3	4.4 mg	5.0 mg
Vitamin B6	0.2 mg	0.2 mg
Vitamin B12	1.4 mcg	1.6 mcg
Vitamin D	<43 IU	<49 IU
Vitamin E	0 mg	0 mg
Calcium	20.3 mg	23 mg
Magnesium	25.8 mg	29.3 mg
Phosphorus	227 mg	257 mg
Potassium	415 mg	471 mg
Selenium	80 mcg	91 mcg

== See also ==
- George Brown Goode
