= Hearth and Home =

American magazine

- Editor: Donald G. Mitchell and Harriet Beecher Stowe (initial editors)
- Frequency: Weekly
- Publisher: Pettengill, Bates & Company (1868-70); Orange Judd & Company (1870-74); Daily Graphic Co. (1874-75)
- First issue: December 26, 1868
- Final issue: December 25, 1875
- Country: United States
- Based in: New York City
- Language: American English

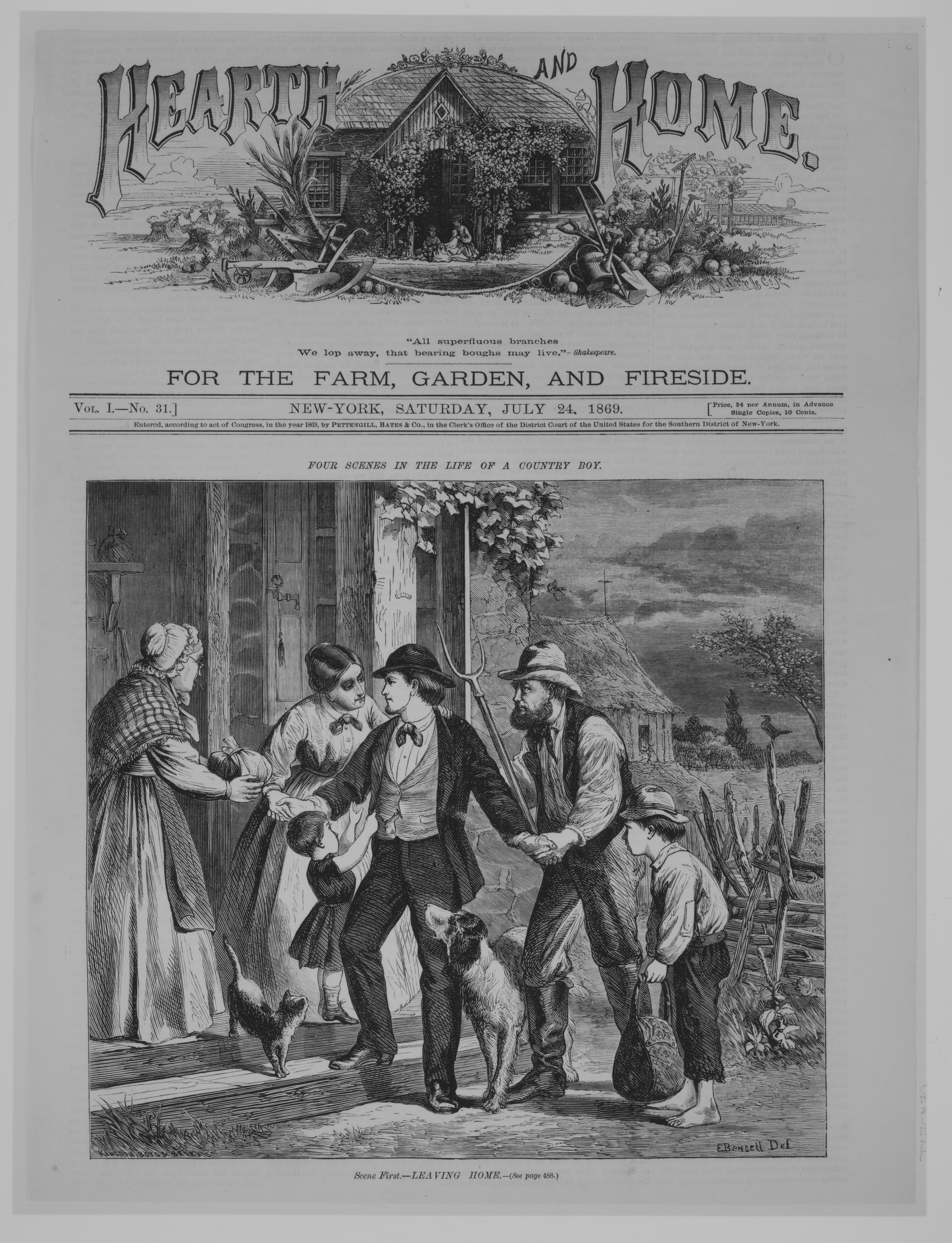
Cover from Hearth and Home

Hearth and Home was an American weekly illustrated magazine which was published from 1868 to 1875. It appeared Saturdays and had a claimed circulation of 40,000 copies in 1869.

== Founding and editors ==
The advertising company of Pettengill, Bates & Company founded the publication, which had a debut issue dated December 26, 1868. The original editors were Donald G. Mitchell and Harriet Beecher Stowe, joined by Mary Mapes Dodge and Joseph B. Lyman as associate editors. Lyman and Stowe left after a year, though Stowe's association with the periodical is the primary reason it receives any modern attention. Dodge, who oversaw the children's pages, remained until 1873 when she became the first editor of St. Nicholas Magazine. Later editors included Edward and George Cary Eggleston and Frank R. Stockton.

== Subsequent owners ==
The publication was never a financial success; George Cary Eggleston later wrote that it was "very ambitious in its projection, very distinguished in the persons of its editors and contributors, and a financial failure from the beginning." Orange Judd & Company purchased the magazine in October 1870, and subsequently sold it to the owners of the New York Daily Graphic (a publication also committed to quality illustrations) in 1874. After seven years, the magazine ceased publication with its December 25, 1875 issue.

== Content ==
Though the publication started out covering both agriculture and literature, it eventually became a "home literary miscellany." It did serialize some notable works including Edward Payson Roe's A Chestnut Burr and Edward Eggleston's The Hoosier Schoolmaster.
