= Craig Township, Switzerland County, Indiana =

Craig Township
- Township
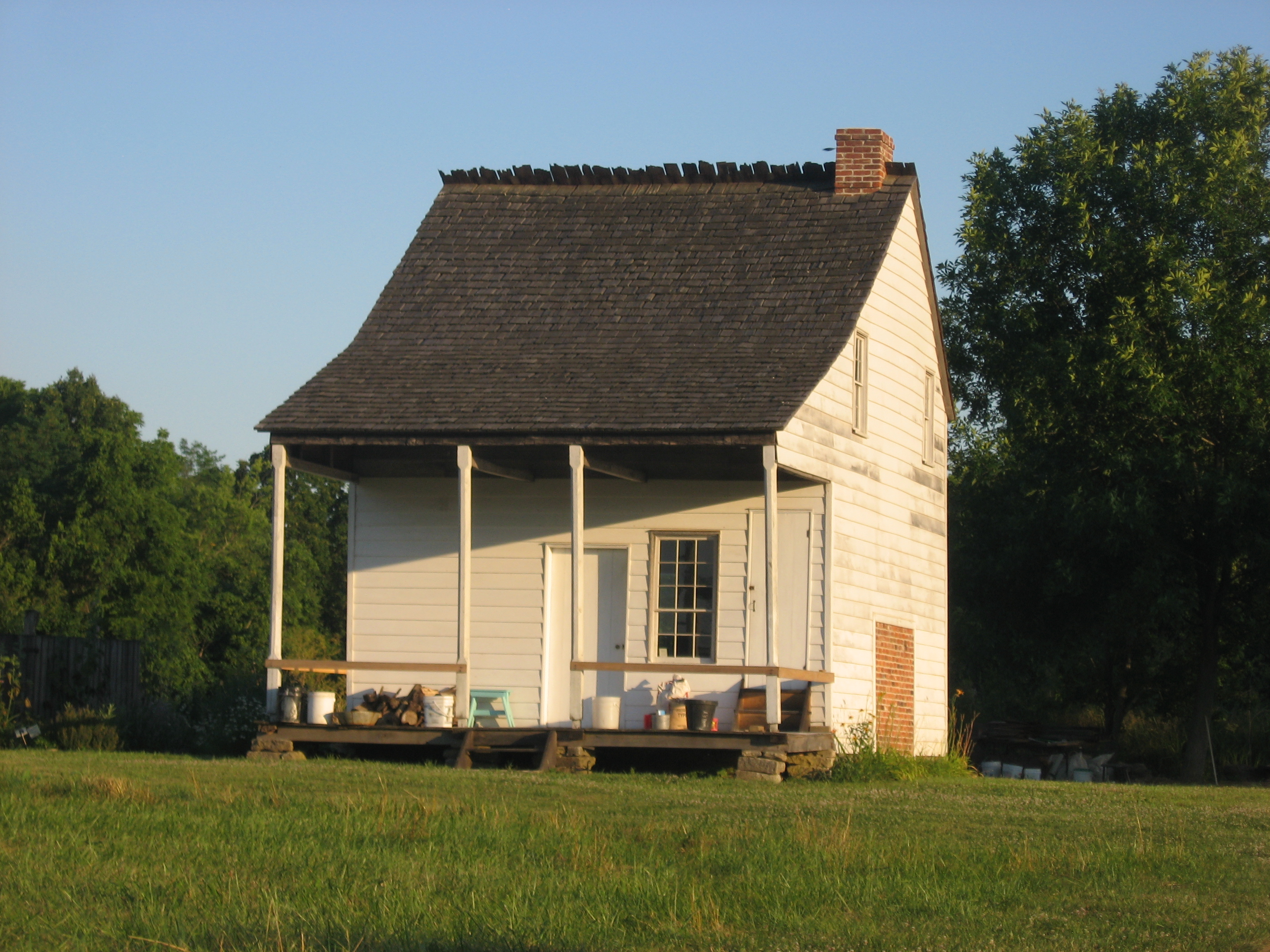
- The Venoge Farmhouse, a historic site in the township

- Location in Switzerland County
- Coordinates: 38°44′48″N 85°08′53″W
- Country: United States
- State: Indiana
- County: Switzerland

Government
  - Type: Indiana township

Area
  - Total: 39.56 sq mi (102.5 km^{2})
  - Land: 39.26 sq mi (101.7 km^{2})
  - Water: 0.3 sq mi (0.78 km^{2}) 0.76%
- Elevation: 574 ft (175 m)

Population (2020)
  - Total: 766
  - Density: 19.5/sq mi (7.53/km^{2})
- ZIP codes: 47011, 47043, 47250
- GNIS feature ID: 453249

Craig Township is one of six townships in Switzerland County, Indiana, United States. As of the 2020 census, its population was 766 and it contained 393 housing units.

Historical population
Census	Pop.	Note	%±
1890	1,980		—
1900	1,931		−2.5%
1910	1,466		−24.1%
1920	1,475		0.6%
1930	1,340		−9.2%
1940	1,187		−11.4%
1950	1,017		−14.3%
1960	831		−18.3%
1970	709		−14.7%
1980	761		7.3%
1990	695		−8.7%
2000	777		11.8%
2010	900		15.8%
2020	766		−14.9%
Source: US Decennial Census

== History ==
Craig Township has the name of George Craig, a pioneer settler and afterward state legislator.

The Thiebaud Farmstead, Venoge Farmstead, and Thomas T. Wright House are listed on the National Register of Historic Places.

== Geography ==
According to the 2010 census, the township has a total area of 39.56 square miles (102.5 km^{2}), of which 39.26 square miles (101.7 km^{2}) (or 99.24%) is land and 0.3 square miles (0.78 km^{2}) (or 0.76%) is water.

=== Unincorporated towns ===
- Braytown at 38.730617°N 85.158564°W
- Lamb at 38.692007°N 85.188009°W

(This list is based on USGS data and may include former settlements.)

=== Adjacent townships ===
- Pleasant Township (north)
- Jefferson Township (northeast)
- Milton Township, Jefferson County (west)

=== Cemeteries ===
The township contains these two cemeteries: McKay and Old Bethel.

=== Major highways ===
- Indiana State Road 56

=== Airports and landing strips ===
- Robinson Airport

== School districts ==
- Switzerland County School Corporation

== Political districts ==
- Indiana's 9th congressional district
- State House District 68
- State Senate District 45
