= Sarah Ford Judd Goode =

American clubwoman

- Born: Sarah Ford Judd; July 18, 1854; New York, New York, U.S.
- Died: April 24, 1921 (aged 66); Tallahassee, Florida, U.S.
- Resting place: Oak Hill Cemetery
- Spouse: George Brown Goode
- Children: 4
- Parent(s): Orange Judd (father); Sarah L. Ford (mother)

Sarah Ford Judd Goode (July 18, 1854 – April 24, 1921) was an American clubwoman and a founding member of the Daughters of the American Revolution.

== Early life ==
Goode was the daughter of the chemist and agricultural writer Orange Judd and Sarah Lamson Ford.

== Civic activities ==
Goode was a founding member and incorporator of the Daughters of the American Revolution (DAR). She was one of three people appointed to a DAR committee tasked with designing an official insignia for the national society. In 1891, they accepted a design created by her husband as the official seal, insignia, and flag for the organization.

== Personal life and death ==
On November 29, 1877, she married the ichthyologist and museum director George Brown Goode. Together, they had four children: Margaret Judd, Kenneth Mackarness, Francis Collier, and Philip Burwell.

She died on April 24, 1921 in Tallahassee, Florida. Her funeral was at Oak Hill Cemetery Chapel in Washington, D.C. on April 29, 1921.
