= Venoge Farmstead =

Historic house in Indiana, United States

- U.S. National Register of Historic Places
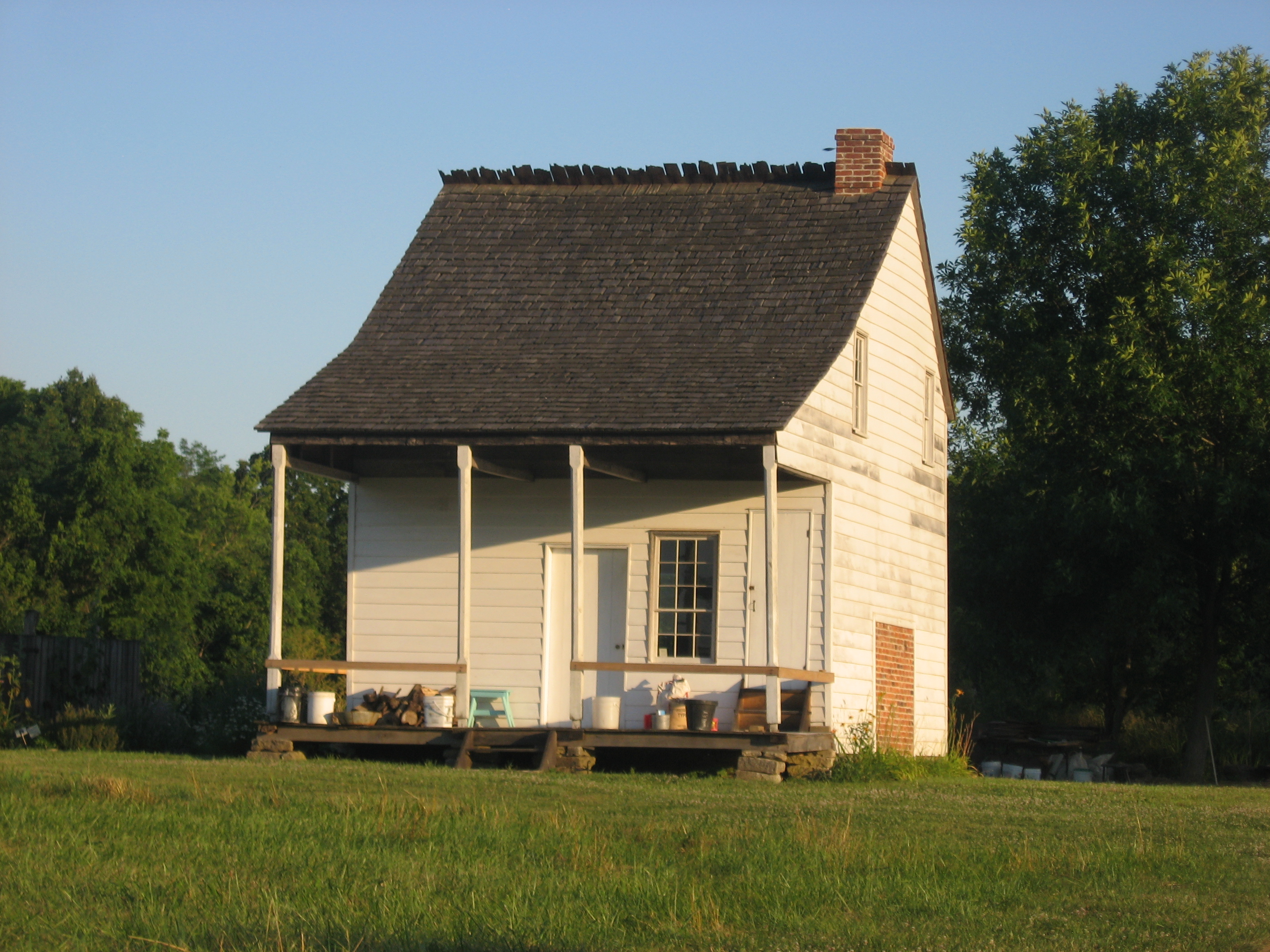
- Venoge Farmhouse, June 2012

- Location within Indiana Location within the United States
- Location: 111 State Road 129, west of Vevay in Craig Township, Switzerland County, Indiana
- Coordinates: 38°44′42″N 85°5′49″W
- Area: 30.1 acres (12.2 ha)
- Built: c. 1805
- Architectural style: Colonial, french colonial
- NRHP reference No.: 96001539
- Added to NRHP: January 2, 1997

Venoge Farmstead, also known as Musee de Venoge, is a historic home and farm located in Craig Township, Switzerland County, Indiana. The house was built in 1828, and is a 1 1/2-story, rectangular frame cottage in a vernacular French Colonial style. It has a side gable roof and measures 18 feet by 38 feet, including an integral front porch.

It was listed on the National Register of Historic Places in 1997.
