= The Hoosier Schoolmaster (novel) =

1871 novel by Edward Eggleston

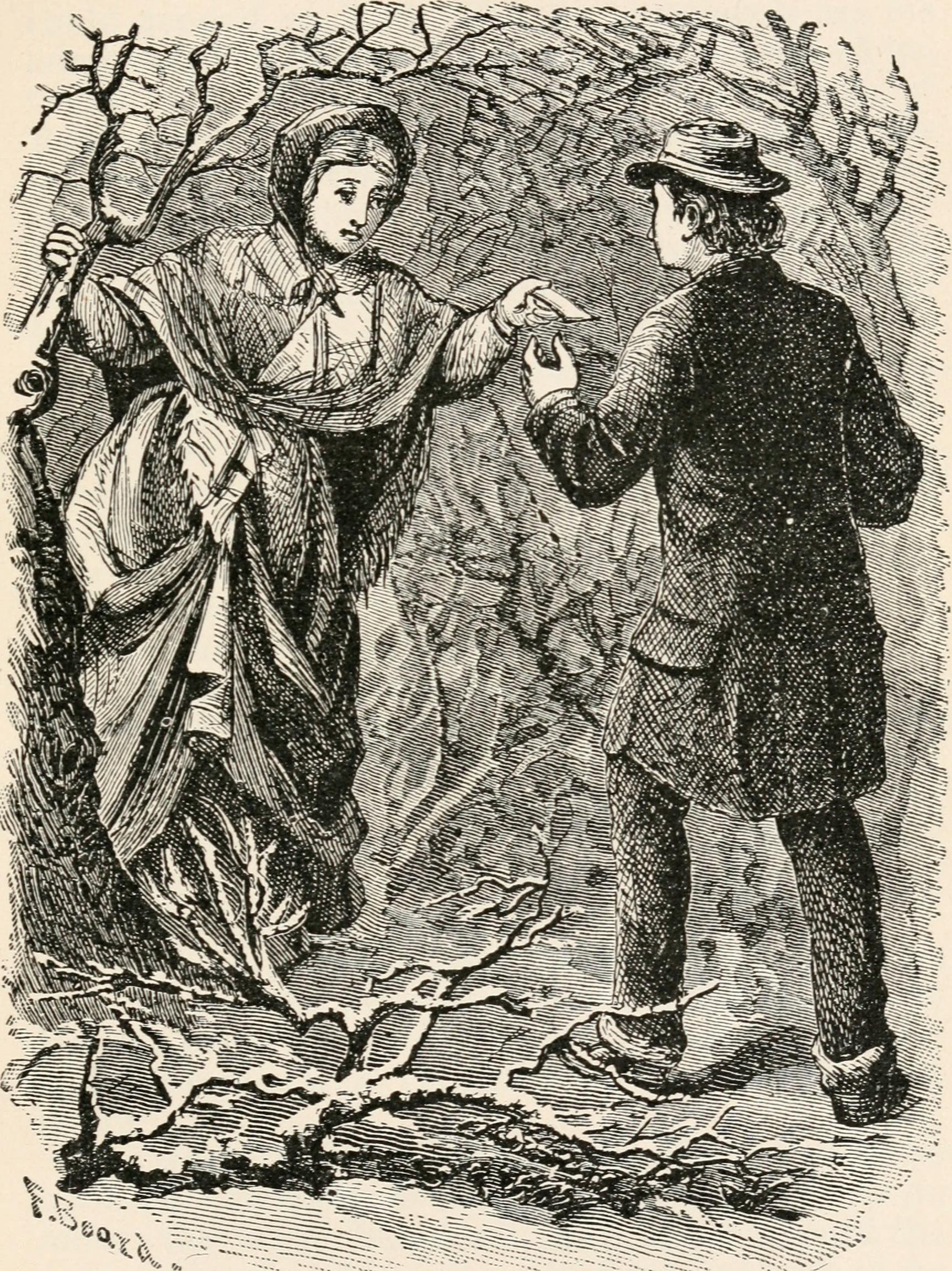
- Illustration from the novel
- Author: Edward Eggleston
- Language: English
- Publisher: Orange Judd
- Publication date: 1871
- Publication place: United States
- Media type: Print (hardcover)
- Pages: 226 pp.
- Followed by: The Hoosier Schoolboy (1883)

The Hoosier Schoolmaster: A Story of Backwoods Life in Indiana is an 1871 novel by the American author Edward Eggleston. The novel originated from a series of stories written for Hearth and Home, a periodical edited by Eggleston, and was based on the experiences of his brother, George Cary Eggleston, who had been a schoolteacher in Indiana. The novel is noted for its realistic depictions of 19th-century American rural life and for its use of local dialect.

== Evaluation ==
In the conclusion to The Hoosier Schoolmaster, Eggleston announces his belief that readers whose taste is not perverted always want a story to “come out well.” Accordingly, he so planned this his first and most important romance that the lovers are all happily united, the poor orphans become prosperous and the evil-doers receive just punishment, mitigated somewhat through the generous intervention of those whom they have wronged. The great popularity of the work has been ascribed not so much to the conventional plot as to its description of early days in Indiana. It pictures the country school in which custom prescribed a constant warfare between the master and the big boys, the community spelling school, the different forms of bigoted and illiterate preaching that were offered to the new settlers, the amusing attempts at formality in the proceedings of the courts, and other features of pioneer life as the author had seen them in his career as itinerant missionary and agent for a Bible society. Eggleston's fondness for historical accuracy sometimes led him to sacrifice the artistic unity of his story in order to introduce a detail exactly as it was found in real life, but this defect is less noticeable in The Hoosier Schoolmaster than in some of his later novels. There is a great variety of characters who, while they are drawn pretty much in unshaded black and white, have enough truth to human nature to seem real. A sufficient humor pervades the whole, the action never drags, and the book despite its limitations deserved the great vogue it had after its publication in 1871.

== Film adaptions ==
- The Hoosier Schoolmaster (1914), directed by Edwin August and Max Figman
- The Hoosier Schoolmaster (1924), directed by Oliver L. Sellers
- The Hoosier Schoolmaster (1935), directed by Lewis D. Collins
