= Orange Judd =

American journalist

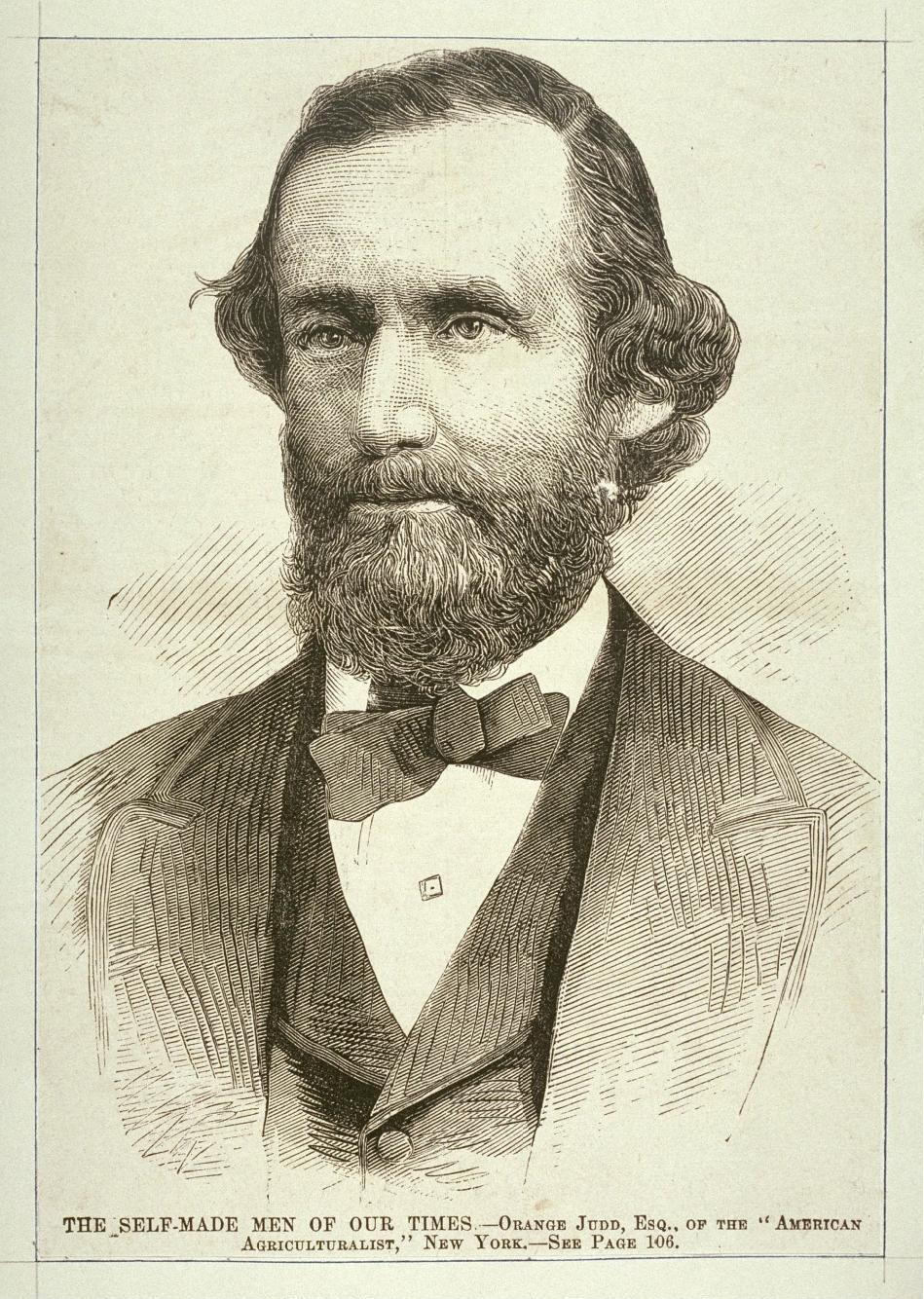
- Born: July 26, 1822; Niagara County, New York, U.S.
- Died: December 27, 1892 (aged 70); Evanston, Illinois, US
- Education: Wesleyan University
- Occupations: Publisher and columnist
- Known for: Agricultural publishing
- Spouse(s): Sarah L. Ford (1847–?); Harriet Stewart
- Children: 4 by Sarah (including Sarah, the other 3 died in Infancy) & 4 by Harriet

Orange Judd (July 26, 1822 – December 27, 1892) was an American agricultural chemist, editor, and publisher.

== Background and family ==
Judd was born of a rural family near Niagara Falls in Niagara County, New York. His grandfather, also named Orange Judd (1763–1844), came from Tyringham, Massachusetts and served as a private in the Berkshire Militia in the Northern Campaigns. His father, Ozias Judd, fought at Black Rock in 1813. Orange Judd's mother was Rheuama Wright, daughter of David Wright who was a private in the New York Militia during the Revolution.

Judd married twice, first to Sarah L. Ford of Boston in 1847, with whom he had four children, three of which died soon after birth, and again to Harriet Stewart of Lockport, New York, with whom he also had four children. His daughter from his first marriage, Sarah Ford, married George Brown Goode in 1877.

Orange Judd's brother, David Wright (1838-1888), was also successful and kept close connections to Orange. Wright was the editor and proprietor of Hearth and Home, one of Judd's periodicals under his publishing firm Orange Judd and Company. In 1871 he was elected as a Republican to the New York Legislature. By 1883 Wright had become president of the company.

== Education and early career ==
In 1847 Judd graduated from Wesleyan University. After graduating he held several teaching positions, first at a high school in Portland, Connecticut in 1847, then at Wilbraham Wesleyan Academy in Wilbraham, Massachusetts from 1848 to 1849, and as a principal of a high school in Middletown, Connecticut in 1850. In 1850 he began studying analytical and agricultural chemistry at Yale for the next three years with John Pitkin Norton. In 1852 he took a job lecturing on agriculture in Windham County, Connecticut until 1853. Judd recalled that his chemistry research at Yale lowered much of his hope for the science, deeming that "much of the so-called agricultural science is yet unreliable." Judd still sought a way to bring the latest research to farmers, but was nevertheless skeptical of much of it.

In 1853 he was made editor of the American Agriculturist (sometimes referred to as the American Agriculturalist), then run by its founders, Anthony B. Allen and his brother Richard L. Allen. He became owner and publisher in 1856. In 1856 Judd moved to Flushing, New York where he lived until 1871. Judd championed the idea of clear and concise writing in journals, and was able to turn a paper of scientific jargon into something any literate farmer was able to understand. Editors would obtain scientific material from colleges and would evaluate it and make it accessible for their readers. He was also one of the first people to practically apply opinion polls—sending out questionnaires on crop reports to his subscribers between May and September and publishing the results in the American Agriculturist. His success helped make American Agriculturist into one of the leading agricultural journals in the nation, going from a circulation 1,000 in 1856, to over 100,000 in 1864. However the paper was hard hit by the depression of 1873, and was failing by 1879. He would stay there until 1881, alongside being the agricultural editor of the New York Times from 1855 to 1863. He started an Illinois company in Chicago, referred to as both Orange Judd and Company and the Orange Judd Company over the years, and a New York company in New York City called the Orange Judd Publishing Company. The firms focused on publishing agricultural and scientific books, as well as Hearth and Home from 1870 to 1873. Orange Judd and Company/New York published several novels by Edward Eggleston, including The Hoosier Schoolmaster, one of the first post-Civil War novels to include regional dialect.

== Later life ==
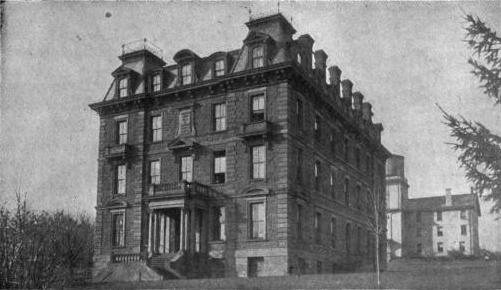
Wesleyan's Orange Judd Hall of Natural Science at around 1890, where the country's first agricultural experiment station was organised.

Judd traveled in Europe in 1862, and in 1863 he served on the United States Christian Commission in Gettysburg, then in 1864 with the United States Sanitary Commission, later with the Army of the Potomac. However he was later brought home due to illness where he reached almost the point of death. In 1866 he became president of the Alumni Association of Wesleyan, a position he held until 1881. He again traveled to Europe in 1871 with his family through numerous countries. From 1868 to 1869 he became president of the New York, Flushing, and North Side Railroad, as well as the New York and Flushing Railroad, in which he became actively engaged in their construction efforts.

Around this time he began to take a greater interest in the affairs of Wesleyan University. He edited their first edition of the "Alumni Record". In 1871 the Orange Judd Hall of Natural Science was opened through his own work, and held the office of trustee from 1871 to 1881. They would also create the first agricultural experiment station in the country there through his donations. In September 1888, The Orange Judd Publishing Company bought another agricultural journal, James Hill's The Farmer, which was in financial trouble. Judd moved it to Chicago and renamed it the Orange Judd Farmer. However, by 1891 Judd still owed Hill $15,000, and all correspondence between them would later cease. He also became a member of the American Association for the Advancement of Science. After 1871 Judd changed his place of residence rather frequently, moving several times between what is now Fresh Meadows, Queens, and New York City, and spending time in Middletown, Connecticut. On account of his poor health he also made a stay in Florida and lived for a time in Europe. Judd died in 1892 in Evanston, Illinois.
