= Edward and George Cary Eggleston House =

Historic house in Indiana, United States

- U.S. National Register of Historic Places
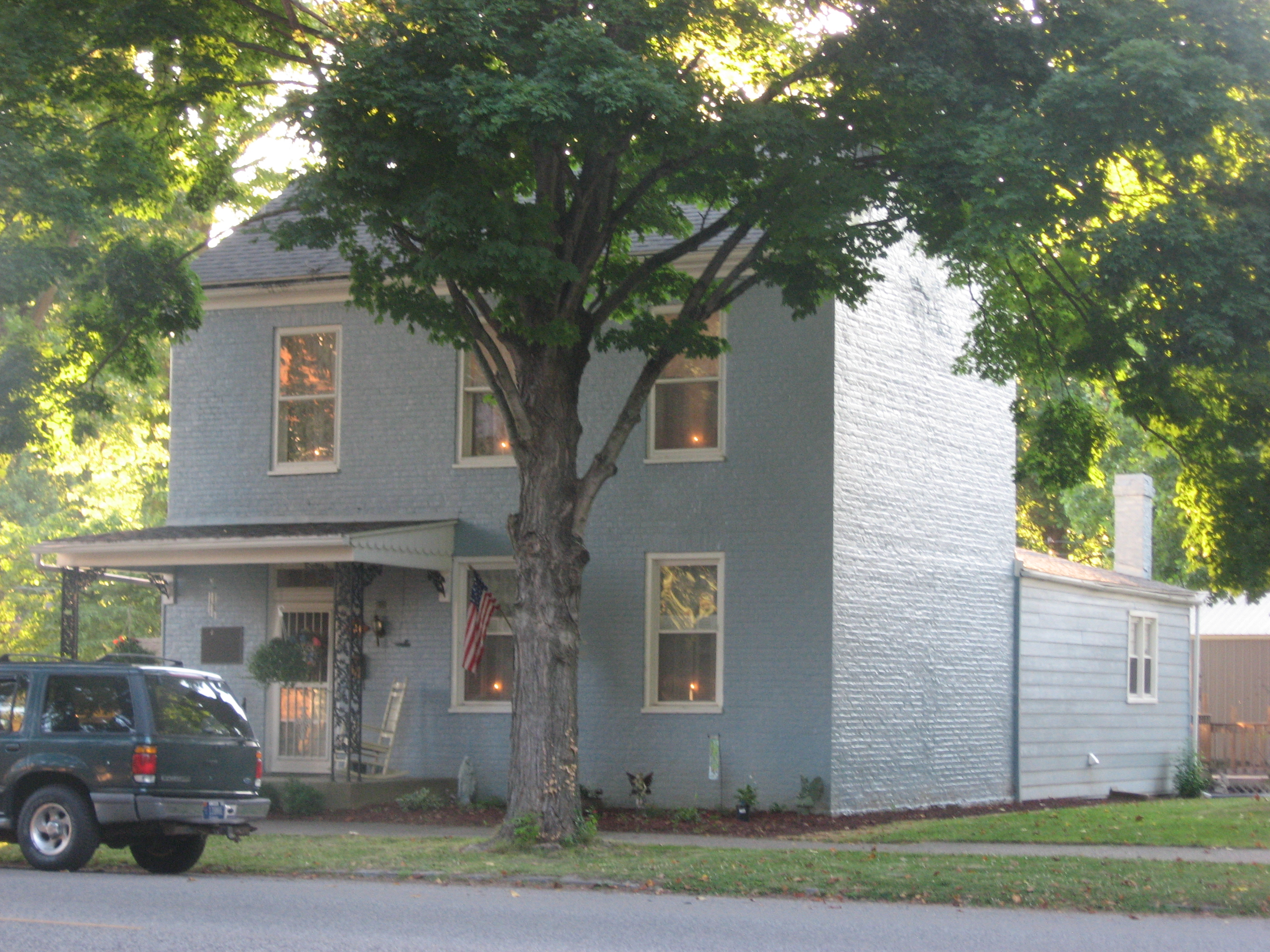
- Edward and George Cary Eggleston House, June 2012

- Location within Indiana Location within the United States
- Location: 306 W. Main St., Vevay, Indiana
- Coordinates: 38°44′44″N 85°4′13″W
- Area: 0.2 acres (0.081 ha)
- Built: 1837
- NRHP reference No.: 73000046
- Added to NRHP: October 15, 1973

Edward and George Cary Eggleston House is a historic home located at Vevay, Indiana. It was built in 1837, and is a two-story, rectangular brick dwelling with a 1 1/2-story rear ell. It was the boyhood home of authors and brothers Edward Eggleston (1837–1902) and George Cary Eggleston (1839–1911).

It was listed on the National Register of Historic Places in 1973.
