= Hoosier Theatre =

- Old Hoosier Theatre
- U.S. National Register of Historic Places
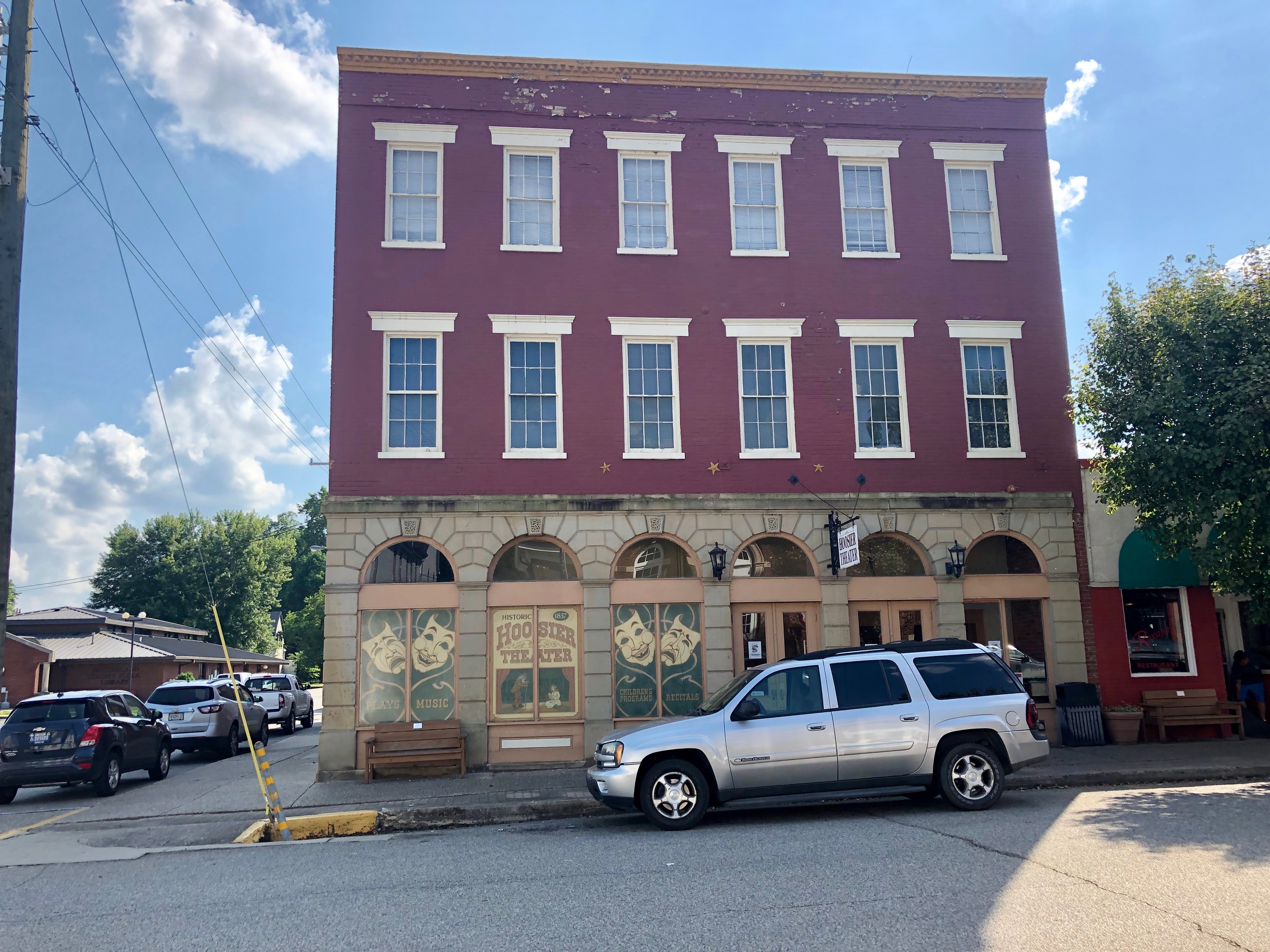
- Hoosier Theater, Principal Facade

- Location within Indiana Location within the United States
- Location: Cheapside and Ferry Sts., Vevay, Indiana
- Coordinates: 38°44′50″N 85°4′1″W
- Area: less than one acre
- Built: 1837
- Built by: Culbertson & Plew
- Architectural style: Renaissance, Federal
- NRHP reference No.: 82000077
- Added to NRHP: March 1, 1982

The Hoosier Theatre is a 225-seat historic theatre located at 209 Ferry Street in Vevay, Indiana. It was built in 1837 as a warehouse and store to serve the town's large Ohio River traffic. Over the years it has housed a saddlery, the local post office, a tavern, the offices of the Vevay Newspaper, and a theatre, which it became in 1926. It was abandoned in 1955 and sat vacant until 1983, when Historic Vevay, Inc., a not-for-profit corporation was formed to purchase and restore the building. It re-opened in 1987 and continues to operate.

It was listed on the National Register of Historic Places in 1982.
