= Switzerland County Courthouse =

- U.S. National Register of Historic Places
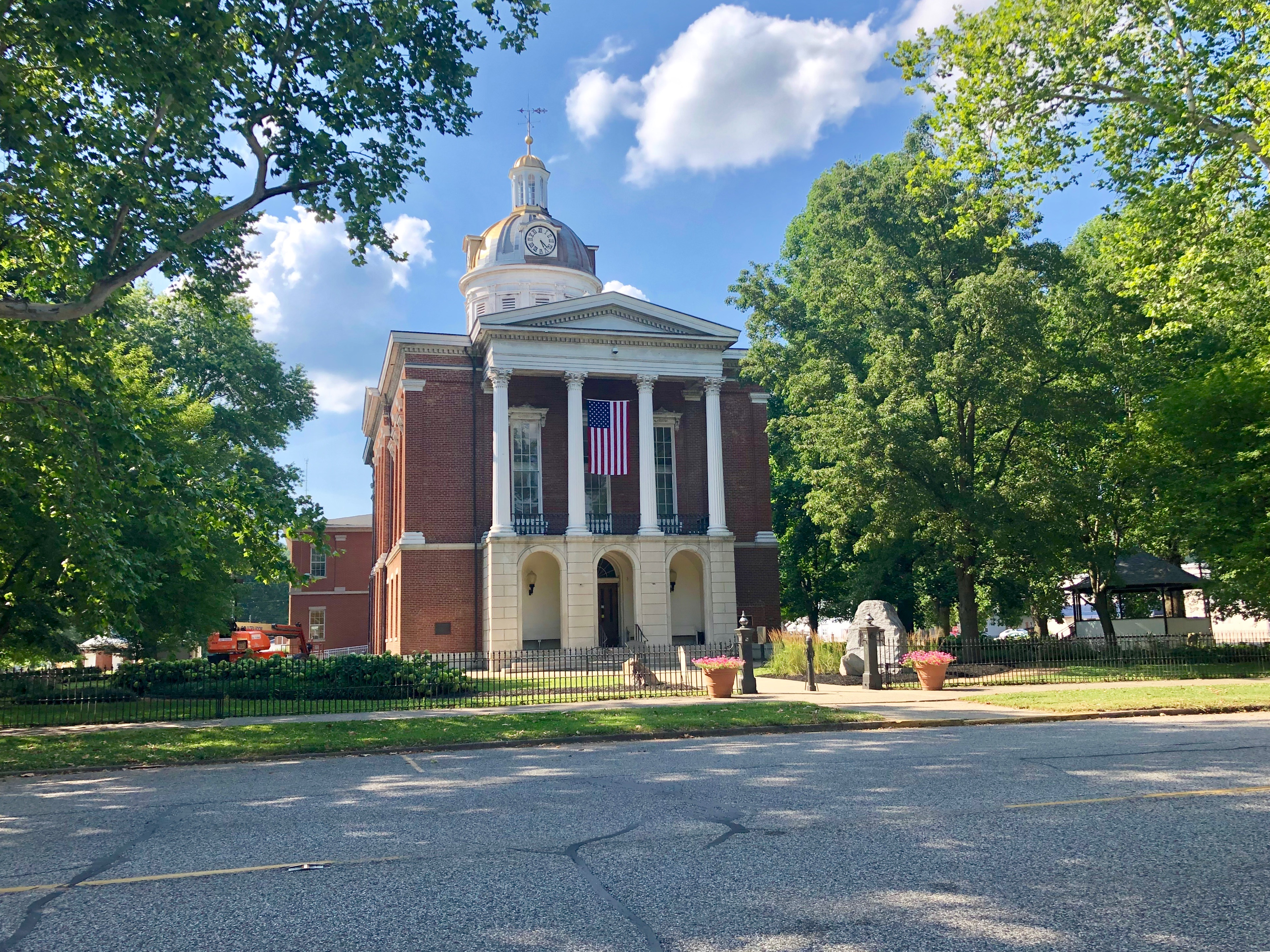
- Switzerland County Courthouse, July 2019

- Location within Indiana Location within the United States
- Location: 212 W. Main St., Vevay, Indiana
- Coordinates: 38°44′49″N 85°4′9″W
- Area: 2 acres (0.81 ha)
- Built: 1862-1864
- Architect: Dubach, David
- Architectural style: Greek Revival
- NRHP reference No.: 09000435
- Added to NRHP: June 17, 2009

Switzerland County Courthouse is a historic courthouse located at Vevay, Indiana. It was built between 1862 and 1864, and is a three-story, rectangular Greek Revival style red brick building with limestone and white painted wood trim. The building measures 52 feet by 96 feet. It features a tall, pedimented tetrastyle portico with fluted Corinthian order columns. The building is topped by a copper clad dome with cupola.

It was listed on the National Register of Historic Places in 2009.
