= Braytown, Indiana =

- Unincorporated community
- Location within Indiana Location within the United States
- Coordinates: 38°43′50″N 85°09′31″W
- Country: United States
- State: Indiana
- County: Switzerland
- Township: Craig
- Elevation: 886 ft (270 m)
- Time zone: UTC-5 (Eastern (EST))
  - Summer (DST): UTC-4 (EDT)
- ZIP code: 47043
- Area codes: 812, 930
- GNIS feature ID: 431461

Braytown is an unincorporated community in Craig Township, Switzerland County, in the U.S. state of Indiana.

== History ==
The community was named after David Bray, a pioneer settler.
