= Benjamin Schenck Mansion =

Historic house in Indiana, United States

- U.S. National Register of Historic Places
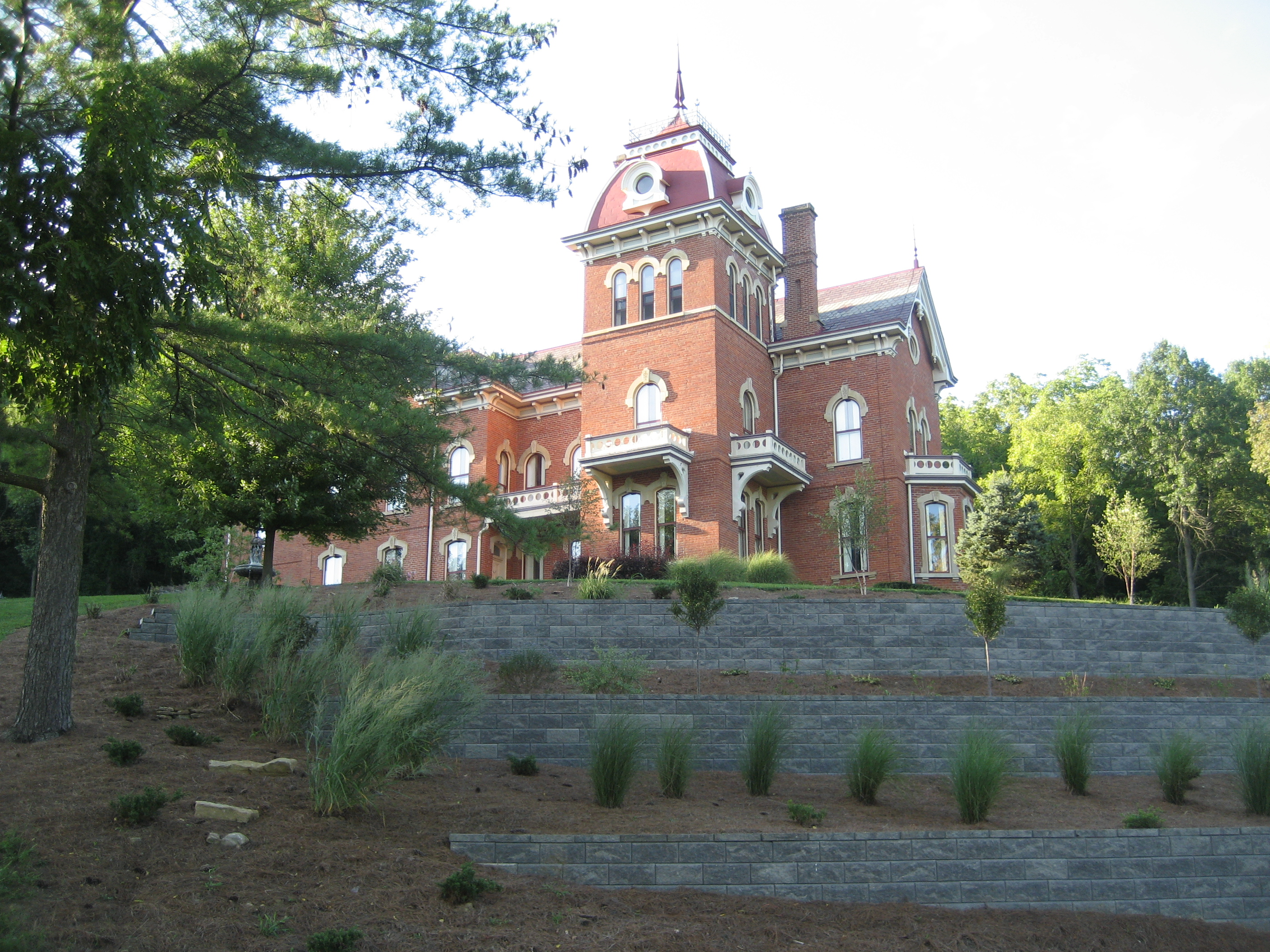
- Benjamin Schenck Mansion, August 2009

- Location within Indiana Location within the United States
- Location: 206 W. Turnpike St., Vevay, Indiana
- Coordinates: 38°45′2″N 85°4′25″W
- Area: less than one acre
- Built: 1874
- Architect: Humprhies, George P.
- Architectural style: Second Empire, Italianate
- NRHP reference No.: 02001174
- Added to NRHP: October 16, 2002

Benjamin Schenck Mansion, also known as Schenck Mansion Bed and Breakfast, is an historic home located at Vevay, Indiana. It was built in 1874, and is a two-story, Italianate / Second Empire style brick mansion on a full basement. The house has over 12,000 square feet of space. It features a four-story tower with a mansard roof measuring 74 feet tall. The house was restored in 2000 and is operated as a bed and breakfast.

It was listed on the National Register of Historic Places in 2002. In 2020, the home was sold to tattoo artist Kat Von D, who announced her plans to move from Los Angeles, California to Indiana and live in the mansion.
