= George Cary Eggleston =

American novelist

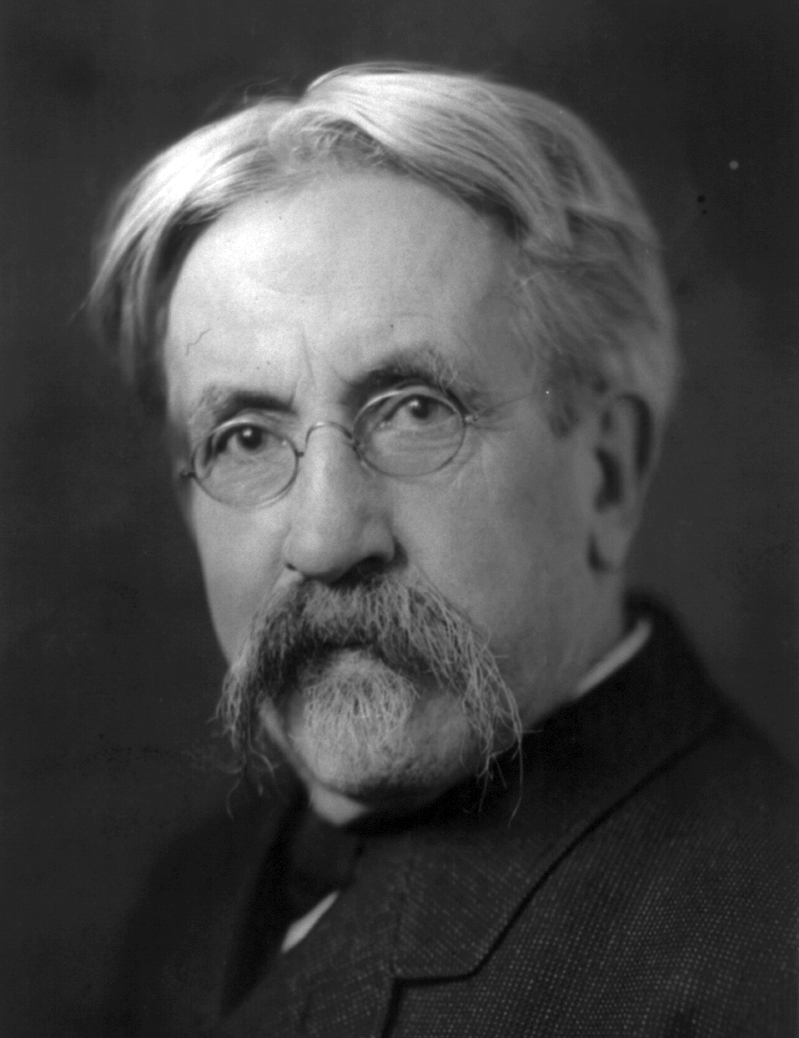
Cary Eggleston

George Cary Eggleston (November 26, 1839 – April 14, 1911) was an American novelist, editor, journalist, and writer. He was the brother of Edward Eggleston (1837–1902) and son of Joseph Cary Eggleston and Mary Jane Craig. He is perhaps best known for his serialized account in The Atlantic Monthly of his time as a Confederate soldier during the American Civil War, later collected and expanded upon under the title A Rebel's Recollections.

== Life ==
Born in Vevay, Indiana, Eggleston attended Indiana Ashbury University (later DePauw University) while still a teenager, but left in 1855 after only one year, becoming briefly a schoolteacher. The following year, in 1856, Eggeleston inherited a plantation in Amelia County, VA, where he "fell in love with the South [...] and considered himself henceforth a loyal Virginian" (though he was against secession).

He enlisted in the Confederate Army during the Civil War, serving in both the cavalry and artillery. After the war, he moved to Illinois, became a lawyer, and married Marion Creggs. Dissatisfied practicing law, however, in 1870 he moved to New York and was hired as a reporter by the Brooklyn Daily Union. He also served as an editor of Hearth and Home magazine in the early 1870s, eventually working under William Cullen Bryant at The Evening Post. From 1889 until his death he worked as an editorial writer at The World.

== Legacy ==
Eggleston coined the term champagne socialist in his 1906 book Blind Alleys in which a character distinguishes the 'beer socialist' who "wants everybody to come down to his low standards of living" and the 'champagne socialist' who "wants everybody to be equal on the higher plane that suits him, utterly ignoring the fact that there is not enough champagne, green turtle and truffles to go round".

His boyhood home in Vevay, known as the Edward and George Cary Eggleston House, was listed on the National Register of Historic Places in 1973.

== Principal works ==
Novels

- A Man of Honor (1873, first serialized in Hearth and Home)
- The Wreck of the Red Bird (1882)
- Juggernaut (1891, with Dolores Bacon)
- Camp Venture, a story of the Virginia mountains (1901)
- A Carolina Cavalier, a Romance of the American Revolution (1902)
- Dorothy South (1902)
- The Master of Warlock; a Virginia War Story (1903)
- Evelyn Byrd (1904)
- Love is the Sum of It All (1907)
- Blind Alleys (1906)
- Irene of the Mountains; a Romance of Old Virginia (1909)
- Westover of Wanalah (1910)

Juvenile Publications

- Big Brother Series (1875–1882)
- Strange Stories from History (1886)

Miscellaneous

- How to Educate Yourself: With or Without Masters (1872)
- A Rebel's Recollections (1874)
- How to Make a Living: Suggestions Upon the Art of Making, Saving, and Using Money (1875)
- Red Eagle and the Wars with the Creek Indians of Alabama (1878)
- The First of the Hoosiers: Reminiscences of Edward Eggleston (1903)
- Recollections of a Varied Life (1910)
- The History of the Confederate War (1910)
