= Richard L. Allen =

American writer on agriculture

- Born: Richard Lamb Allen; October 20, 1803; Westfield, Massachusetts
- Died: September 22, 1869 (aged 65); Stockholm, Sweden
- Education: Westfield Academy
- Spouse: Sally Outram Lyman (after 1834)

Richard Lamb Allen (October 20, 1803 – September 22, 1869) was an American writer on agriculture.

== Early life ==
Allen was born on October 20, 1803, near Westfield, Massachusetts. He was the fourth son of Samuel and Ruth (née Falley) Allen.

He received his early education at Westfield Academy and Franklin, Connecticut. He studied law in Baltimore in the office of William Wirt while running a school with a friend. But he found himself obliged to seek a more active life on account of his health.

== Career ==
In 1833, he went to Buffalo, New York, and involved himself in mercantile pursuits. His ambition was, through investments in land, to earn enough to take up a life of study and travel. The Panic of 1837 quashed these plans, and he passed the next seven years on his farm on the Niagara River.

In 1842, he started the American Agriculturist in partnership with his elder brother, Anthony B. Allen, but soon after left for New Orleans on a business venture. In 1847, he rejoined his brother, now in New York City, where he had established an agricultural business in connection with the journal. Richard L. Allen resided on Staten Island with his family. In 1856 American Agriculturist was sold to Orange Judd, and the brothers opened a warehouse for supplying improved agricultural implements.

== Personal life ==
In December 1834, he married Sarah Outram "Sally" Lyman (1812–1892), the daughter of the Hon. Jonathan Huntington Lyman and Sophia Hinckley Lyman. Together, they were the parents of:

- Richard Hinckley Allen (1838–1908), an amateur naturalist who married Mary Campbell Wallace.
- Mary Isabel Allen (1840–1908), who died unmarried in Northampton, Massachusetts.
- Huntington Lyman Allen (1843–1844), who died in infancy.
- Arthur Huntington Allen (1851–1923), a Presbyterian minister who married Agnes Crosby (1858–1891), daughter of the Rev. Dr. Howard Crosby, Chancellor of New York University.

In 1866, three members of Allen's family sailed for Europe. Allen was not able to join them until 1868, and died in Sweden in 1869.

Allen was a Presbyterian Church elder.

== Works ==
- A Brief Compend of American Agriculture, covering crops, animals and equipment (1847)
- History and Description of Domestic Animals, a revision of the portion of Compend on animals (New York, 1848)
- The American Farm Book, a revision of the portion of Compend on crops and equipment with illustrations (1849)
- The Diseases of Domestic Animals (1848)
- American Agriculture
- American Farmer's Muck-Book
- New American Farm Book, an update of the entire Compend (1869, another edition appeared in 1883, edited by Lewis F. Allen, Richard's brother)
- Domestic Animals. (1865) subtitled History and Description of the Horse, Mule, Cattle, Sheep, Swine, Poultry and Farm Dogs. With direction for their Management, Breeding, Crossing, Rearing, Feeding and Preparation for a Profitable Market; also their Diseases and Remedies together with Full Directions for the Management of the Dairy (1865) New-York: Orange Judd.
