= The Hoosier Schoolmaster (1935 film) =

1935 film

- Directed by: Lewis D. Collins
- Written by: Charles Logue
- Based on: The Hoosier Schoolmaster by Edward Eggleston
- Produced by: Paul Malvern
- Starring: Norman Foster; Charlotte Henry; Otis Harlan
- Cinematography: Harry Neumann
- Edited by: Carl Pierson
- Music by: Mischa Bakaleinikoff
- Production company: Paul Malvern Productions
- Distributed by: Monogram Pictures
- Release date: May 15, 1935
- Running time: 75 minutes
- Country: United States
- Language: English

The Hoosier Schoolmaster is a 1935 American historical drama film directed by Lewis D. Collins and starring Norman Foster, Charlotte Henry and Otis Harlan. It was distributed by the independent studio Monogram Pictures. It is an adaptation of the 1871 novel The Hoosier Schoolmaster by Edward Eggleston, which had previously been made into two silent films.

== Plot ==
In the wake of the American Civil War, a former Union soldier settles in southern Indiana to become a schoolmaster. As this is largely butternut country, he receives a great deal of hostility from locals who had supported the Confederates.

== Cast ==
- Norman Foster as Ralph Hartsook
- Charlotte Henry as Hannah
- Dorothy Libaire as Martha Means
- Tommy Bupp as Shocky
- Otis Harlan as Squire Hawkins
- Fred Kohler Jr. as Bud Larkin
- William V. Mong as Jake Means
- Russell Simpson as Doc Small
- Joseph E. Bernard as Randall
- Wallace Reid Jr. as Hank
- George 'Gabby' Hayes as Pearson
- Sarah Padden as Sarah

== Bibliography ==
- Considine, David M. The Cinema of Adolescence. McFarland, 1985.
- Fetrow, Alan G. Sound films, 1927-1939: a United States Filmography. McFarland, 1992.
- Goble, Alan. The Complete Index to Literary Sources in Film. Walter de Gruyter, 1999.
