= Thiebaud Farmstead =

Historic site in Indiana, United States

- U.S. National Register of Historic Places
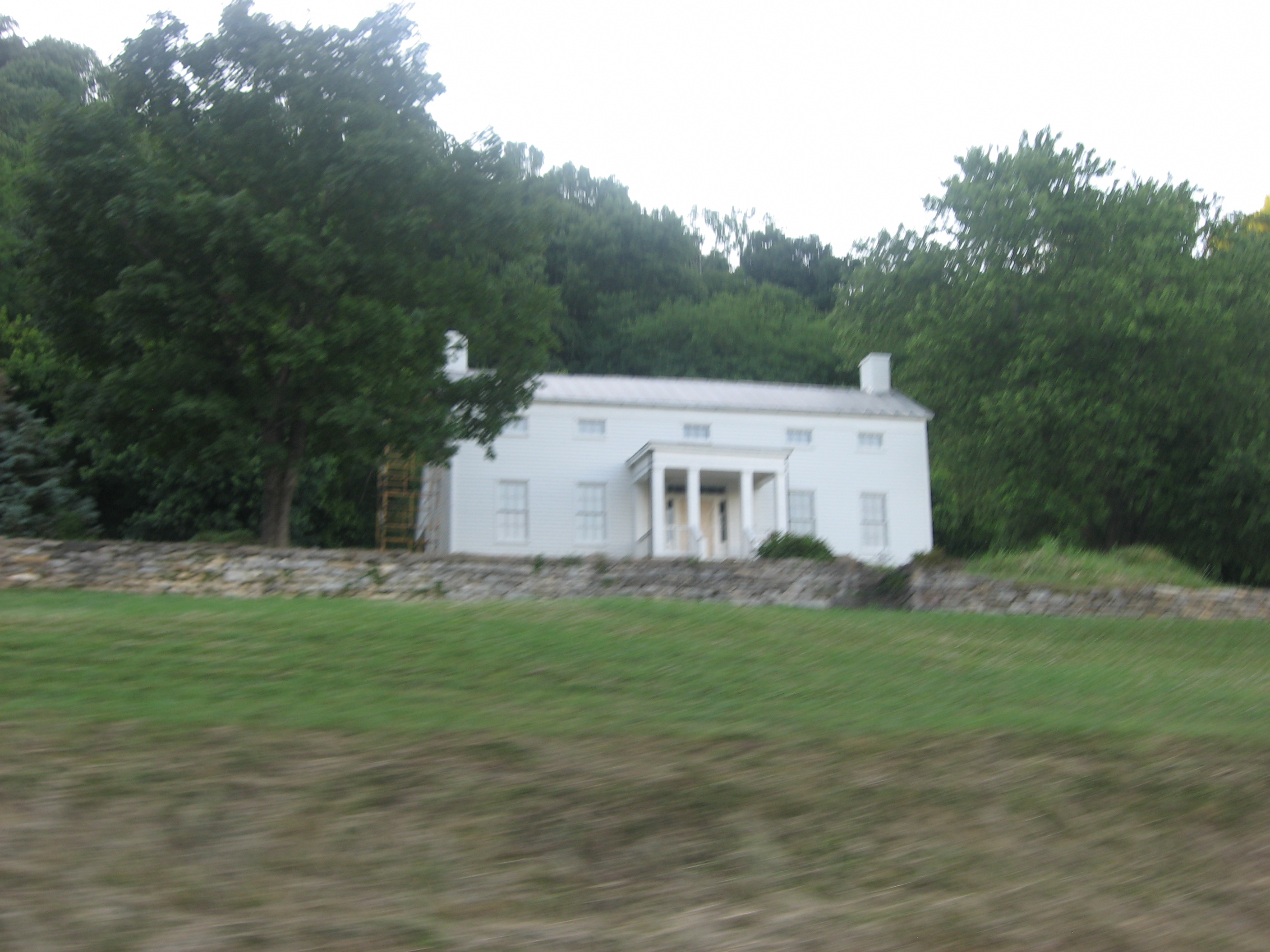
- Thiebaud's Greek Revival style house
- Location: 5147 IN-56, Vevay, Indiana 47043
- Coordinates: 38°42′57″N 85°07′00″W
- Website: switzcomuseums.org/thiebaud-farmstead/
- NRHP reference No.: 04000629

Thiebaud Farmstead is a historic farmstead located outside of Vevay, Indiana.

== History ==
Frederick and Harriet Thiebaud emigrated from Switzerland with their eight children in 1817 and became a part of the first group to settle in Switzerland County. Once there, they began cultivating vineyards. They were a part of the local community that established a successful vineyard and winery, producing up to 12,000 gallons per year.

Their youngest son Justi had taken over the farmstead by 1847. He built the farmstead's two-story Greek Revival house overlooking the Ohio River in the 1850s.

Around the same time the house was being constructed the Thiebauds also built a hay barn. Thiebaud was a noted participant in hay local hay production for urban stables who had no access to pastures. That hay barn housed a hay press that was likely a model that would later become knows as the "Mormon Press," one of the most successful hay press styles of the era. The three-story tall machine used horsepower to turn a large iron screw and pulleys to drop a wooden block into a hay-filled box, resulting in large compressed hay bales. The hay press device saved valuable space in shipping and allowed for twice as much hay to be loaded for transport.

The counties bordering the Ohio River prospered from the 1840s to the 1870s thanks to a system of cultivating, pressing, and exporting hay, specifically Timothy hay, via waterways to satisfy the increasing needs of urban horse populations. The Thiebaud family was just one of many that took part in hay production and a dock facility was likely located at the farm to enable the tons of hay produced there to be loaded onto riverboats. The hay press saw production peak around the 1870s. The Thiebaud farmstead was estimated to have produced six tons of hay in 1850, 39 tons in 1860, and 80 tons in 1870.

== Historic site and museum ==
In the early 2000s, the project to turn the farmstead into a living history and agriculture museum began. In 2004, the Thiebaud Farmstead was listed in the National Register of Historic Places.

This historic site is cared for and operated by the Switzerland County Historical Society. Many of the farm's original buildings remained when the historical society took proprietorship, including the barn. In 2016, the Society acquired a hay press from another property to replace the original one which was gone. Carpenters and volunteers reconstructed it in the Thiebaud barn as part of a push to showcase local technology.

In 2022, the Indiana Historical Bureau, Switzerland County Historical Society, and Switzerland County Tourism office erected a state historic marker commemorating the history of Swiss immigrants in the area and the contributions of the Thiebaud family in the 19th-century.
