= Vevay, Indiana =

- Town
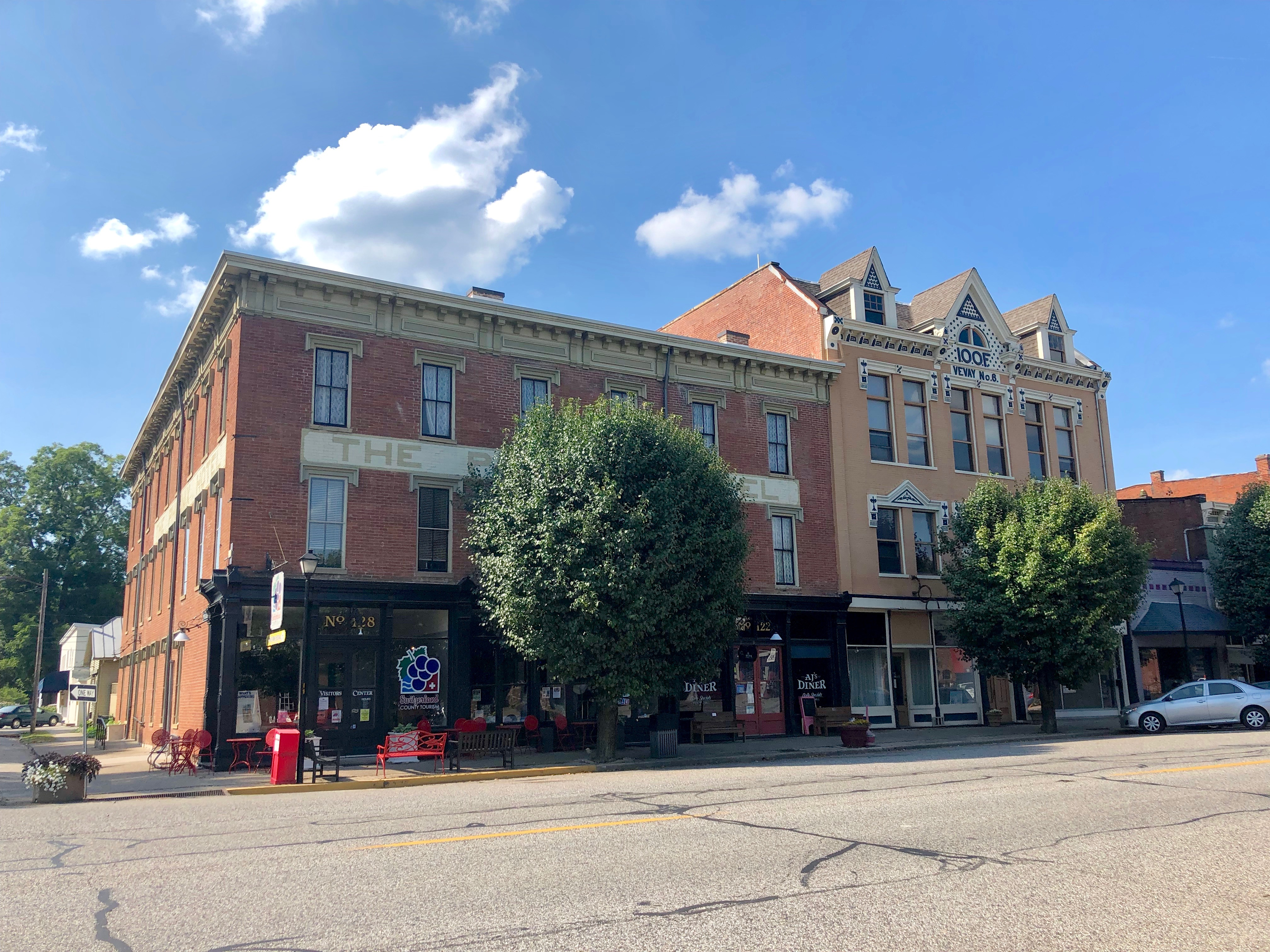
- Main Street in Downtown Vevay

- Location of Vevay in Switzerland County, Indiana.

- Location within Indiana Location within the United States
- Coordinates: 38°44′45″N 85°04′16″W
- Country: United States
- State: Indiana
- County: Switzerland
- Township: Jefferson

Area
  - Total: 1.55 sq mi (4.01 km^{2})
  - Land: 1.45 sq mi (3.76 km^{2})
  - Water: 0.10 sq mi (0.26 km^{2})
- Elevation: 482 ft (147 m)

Population (2020)
  - Total: 1,741
  - Density: 1,200.1/sq mi (463.37/km^{2})
- Time zone: UTC-5 (Eastern (EST))
  - Summer (DST): UTC-4 (EDT)
- ZIP code: 47043
- Area code: 812
- FIPS code: 18-79010
- GNIS feature ID: 2397716
- Website: vevay.in.gov

Vevay (/ˈviːviː/ VEE-vee) is a town located in Jefferson Township and the county seat of Switzerland County, Indiana, United States, along the Ohio River. The population was 1,741 at the 2020 census.

== History ==
The first settlers who arrived in 1802 were Swiss immigrants intending on cultivating grapes and producing wine. It was named after the Swiss town of Vevey. The town was platted in 1813. When Switzerland County was formed in 1814, Vevay was made the county seat. The Indiana town was spelled differently from the Swiss one in a failed attempt to have other Hoosiers pronounce the name the way the Swiss one was pronounced. (Note: See pronunciation of Vevey. See also pronunciation of Indiana cities Versailles and Vincennes as motivation for the attempt.)

The Vevay post office has been in operation since 1816. The community was incorporated as a town in 1836. Vevay collected a reputation of being home to the first commercial winery in the United States. However, the first certified commercial winery was established in Nicholasville, Kentucky, in 1799 by Swiss immigrant John Dufour. The Edward and George Cary Eggleston House, Old Hoosier Theatre, Benjamin Schenck Mansion, and Switzerland County Courthouse are listed on the National Register of Historic Places.

== Geography ==
Vevay is located along the Ohio River and Indiana State Road 56/156.

According to the 2010 census, Vevay has a total area of 1.547 square miles (4.01 km^{2}), of which 1.45 square miles (3.76 km^{2}) (or 93.73%) is land and 0.097 square miles (0.25 km^{2}) (or 6.27%) is water.

=== Climate ===
The climate in this area is characterized by hot, humid summers and generally mild to cool winters. According to the Köppen Climate Classification system, Vevay has a humid subtropical climate, abbreviated "Cfa" on climate maps.

Climate data for Vevay, Indiana (1991–2020)
Month	Jan	Feb	Mar	Apr	May	Jun	Jul	Aug	Sep	Oct	Nov	Dec	Year
Mean daily maximum °F (°C)	41.3 (5.2)	46.1 (7.8)	56.6 (13.7)	69.1 (20.6)	77.8 (25.4)	84.6 (29.2)	88.5 (31.4)	87.6 (30.9)	81.4 (27.4)	69.4 (20.8)	55.9 (13.3)	44.9 (7.2)	66.9 (19.4)
Daily mean °F (°C)	33.4 (0.8)	36.9 (2.7)	45.8 (7.7)	56.8 (13.8)	66.4 (19.1)	73.8 (23.2)	77.8 (25.4)	76.7 (24.8)	70.0 (21.1)	58.0 (14.4)	46.1 (7.8)	37.4 (3.0)	56.6 (13.7)
Mean daily minimum °F (°C)	25.4 (−3.7)	27.7 (−2.4)	35.0 (1.7)	44.5 (6.9)	55.1 (12.8)	63.1 (17.3)	67.1 (19.5)	65.8 (18.8)	58.6 (14.8)	46.6 (8.1)	36.3 (2.4)	29.9 (−1.2)	46.3 (7.9)
Average precipitation inches (mm)	3.61 (92)	3.01 (76)	4.42 (112)	4.54 (115)	4.94 (125)	5.18 (132)	4.21 (107)	3.79 (96)	3.31 (84)	3.42 (87)	3.85 (98)	4.20 (107)	48.48 (1,231)
Average snowfall inches (cm)	6.1 (15)	4.4 (11)	2.7 (6.9)	0.3 (0.76)	0.0 (0.0)	0.0 (0.0)	0.0 (0.0)	0.0 (0.0)	0.0 (0.0)	0.5 (1.3)	0.7 (1.8)	5.9 (15)	20.6 (51.76)
Source: NOAA

== Demographics ==
Historical population
Census	Pop.	Note	%±
1840	1,200		—
1860	1,198		—
1880	1,884		—
1890	1,663		−11.7%
1900	1,588		−4.5%
1910	1,256		−20.9%
1920	1,175		−6.4%
1930	1,183		0.7%
1940	1,209		2.2%
1950	1,309		8.3%
1960	1,503		14.8%
1970	1,463		−2.7%
1980	1,343		−8.2%
1990	1,393		3.7%
2000	1,735		24.6%
2010	1,683		−3.0%
2020	1,741		3.4%
U.S. Decennial Census

=== 2020 census ===
As of the 2020 census, Vevay had a population of 1,741. The median age was 43.3 years. 18.5% of residents were under the age of 18 and 19.3% of residents were 65 years of age or older. For every 100 females there were 100.1 males, and for every 100 females age 18 and over there were 94.7 males age 18 and over.

0.0% of residents lived in urban areas, while 100.0% lived in rural areas.

There were 771 households in Vevay, of which 25.7% had children under the age of 18 living in them. Of all households, 33.2% were married-couple households, 24.3% were households with a male householder and no spouse or partner present, and 34.4% were households with a female householder and no spouse or partner present. About 42.0% of all households were made up of individuals and 18.6% had someone living alone who was 65 years of age or older.

There were 883 housing units, of which 12.7% were vacant. The homeowner vacancy rate was 4.5% and the rental vacancy rate was 7.7%.

Racial composition as of the 2020 census
Race	Number	Percent
White	1,645	94.5%
Black or African American	9	0.5%
American Indian and Alaska Native	2	0.1%
Asian	10	0.6%
Native Hawaiian and Other Pacific Islander	0	0.0%
Some other race	8	0.5%
Two or more races	67	3.8%
Hispanic or Latino (of any race)	17	1.0%

=== 2010 census ===
As of the census of 2010, there were 1,683 people, 725 households, and 393 families living in the town. The population density was 1,160.7 inhabitants per square mile (448.1/km^{2}). There were 826 housing units at an average density of 569.7 per square mile (220.0/km^{2}). The racial makeup of the town was 97.1% White, 0.5% African American, 0.5% Asian, 0.7% from other races, and 1.2% from two or more races. Hispanic or Latino of any race were 1.1% of the population.

There were 725 households, of which 27.6% had children under the age of 18 living with them, 36.3% were married couples living together, 14.2% had a female householder with no husband present, 3.7% had a male householder with no wife present, and 45.8% were non-families. 39.9% of all households were made up of individuals, and 15.3% had someone living alone who was 65 years of age or older. The average household size was 2.18 and the average family size was 2.89.

The median age in the town was 40.8 years. 20.3% of residents were under the age of 18; 9.2% were between the ages of 18 and 24; 25.7% were from 25 to 44; 27.2% were from 45 to 64; and 17.6% were 65 years of age or older. The gender makeup of the town was 48.8% male and 51.2% female.

=== 2000 census ===
As of the census of 2000, there were 1735 people, 719 households, and 437 families living in the town. The population density was 1,171.3 inhabitants per square mile (452.2/km^{2}). There were 795 housing units at an average density of 536.7 per square mile (207.2/km^{2}). The racial makeup of the town was 98.67% White, 0.23% African American, 0.17% Native American, 0.12% Asian, 0.69% from other races, and 0.12% from two or more races. Hispanic or Latino of any race were 1.44% of the population.

There were 719 households, out of which 29.3% had children under the age of 18 living with them, 40.2% were married couples living together, 16.6% had a female householder with no husband present, and 39.1% were non-families. 33.8% of all households were made up of individuals, and 15.9% had someone living alone who was 65 years of age or older. The average household size was 2.29 and the average family size was 2.92.

In the town, the population was spread out, with 24.4% under the age of 18, 9.1% from 18 to 24, 25.2% from 25 to 44, 22.0% from 45 to 64, and 19.2% who were 65 years of age or older. The median age was 38 years. For every 100 females, there were 82.6 males. For every 100 females age 18 and over, there were 77.2 males.

The median income for a household in the town was $27,448, and the median income for a family was $32,857. Males had a median income of $28,068 versus $20,167 for females. The per capita income for the town was $15,477. About 11.4% of families and 15.1% of the population were below the poverty line, including 15.2% of those under age 18 and 11.8% of those age 65 or over.

== Education ==
=== Elementary schools ===
- Jeff-Craig Elementary School
- Switzerland County Elementary School

=== Middle schools ===
- Switzerland Middle School

=== High schools ===
- Switzerland County Senior High School

=== Others ===
The town has a lending library, the Switzerland County Public Library.

== Arts and culture ==
=== The Swiss Wine Festival ===
Vevay holds an annual celebration called the Swiss Wine Festival. It is usually held on the last weekend in August, as well as the preceding Thursday and Friday. This festival was first celebrated in the 1970s and soon became the most adored tradition of the locals. The festival originates from the Fête des Vignerons (The Winegrowers' Festival) celebrated in Vevey.

=== Points of interest ===
- "Life on the Ohio" River History Museum reflects Vevay's and Switzerland County's heritage on the Ohio River.
- Switzerland County Historical Museum is located in an old Presbyterian church, built in 1860.
- The first Switzerland County Courthouse was built in 1822 and is listed on the National Register of Historic Places. It was replaced by the one that stands today in 1865, built by contractor John Haley.
- The Benjamin Franklin Schenck Mansion is a 35-room mansion, built in 1874 by Benjamin Franklin Schenck
- The U.P. Schenck House was built in 1846 for Ulysses P. Schenck, a Swiss riverboat captain who owned a fleet of flat bottom river boats.
- The Armstrong Tavern is a two-story log house built in 1816 by Thomas Armstrong.
- The Hoosier Theatre was built in 1837 and is listed on the National Register of Historic Places.

== Notable people ==
- Lydia Moss Bradley, philanthropist and founder of Bradley University
- Ebenezer Dumont, Civil War general and U.S. Congressman
- Julia Louisa Dumont (1794–1857), educator and writer
- Edward Eggleston, Methodist minister and author
- George Cary Eggleston, author, editor, Civil War Historian, and brother to Edward Eggleston.
- Bertha Fry, supercentenarian, born in Vevay in 1893, died in 2007 at age 113 years, 11 months, 13 days
- Ken Maynard, actor and stuntman
- Kermit Maynard, actor and stuntman, played for Indiana University Football 1920s.
- Will Henry Stevens, artist
- E. S. L. Thompson (1848–1944), writer
- Kat Von D

== See also ==
- List of cities and towns along the Ohio River
