= Allensville =

Allensville may refer to:

== Places ==
Canada

- Allensville, Ontario

United States

- Allensville, Indiana
- Allensville, Kentucky
- Allensville, Ohio
- Allensville, Pennsylvania
- Allensville, West Virginia
- East Enterprise, Indiana

== See also ==
- Allenville (disambiguation)
