= Chase Van Dyne =

American football player (1901–1962)

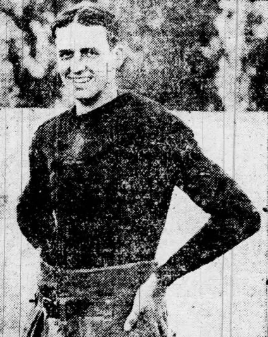
- Van Dyne, circa 1923

No. 15
- Position: Tackle

Personal information
- Born: February 12, 1901; Jacksonville, Indiana, U.S.
- Died: September 22, 1962 (aged 61); Kansas City, Missouri, U.S.
- Listed height: 6 ft 1 in (1.85 m)
- Listed weight: 194 lb (88 kg)

Career information
- High school: Smith-Cotton (Sedalia, Missouri)
- College: Missouri

Career history
- Buffalo Bisons (1925)
- Stats at Pro Football Reference

Charles Moorman Pleasant "Chase" Van Dyne (February 12, 1901 – September 22, 1962) was an American football player. He played college football for the Missouri Tigers and professionally for the Buffalo Bisons of the National Football League (NFL).

== Early life ==
Charles Moorman Pleasant Van Dyne was born on February 12, 1901, in Jacksonville, Indiana. He attended Smith-Cotton High School in Sedalia, Missouri.

== College career ==
Van Dyne enrolled at the University of Missouri to play college football for the Tigers. He was on the frosh team from 1920 to 1921. He was a three-year varsity letterman from 1922 to 1924.

== Professional career ==
Van Dyne played in seven or eight games, starting six, for the Buffalo Bisons of the National Football League (NFL) during the 1925 season. On November 25, 1925, it was reported that Van Dyne had said "professional football [was] too mechanical to hold the public interest".

== Personal life ==
Van Dyne died on September 22, 1962, at St. Luke's Hospital in Kansas City, Missouri. At the time of his death, he was vice president and general manager of Adco, Inc. He was also previously president of the Sedalia Chamber of Commerce.
