= Merit–Tandy Farmstead =

Historic house in Indiana, United States

- U.S. National Register of Historic Places
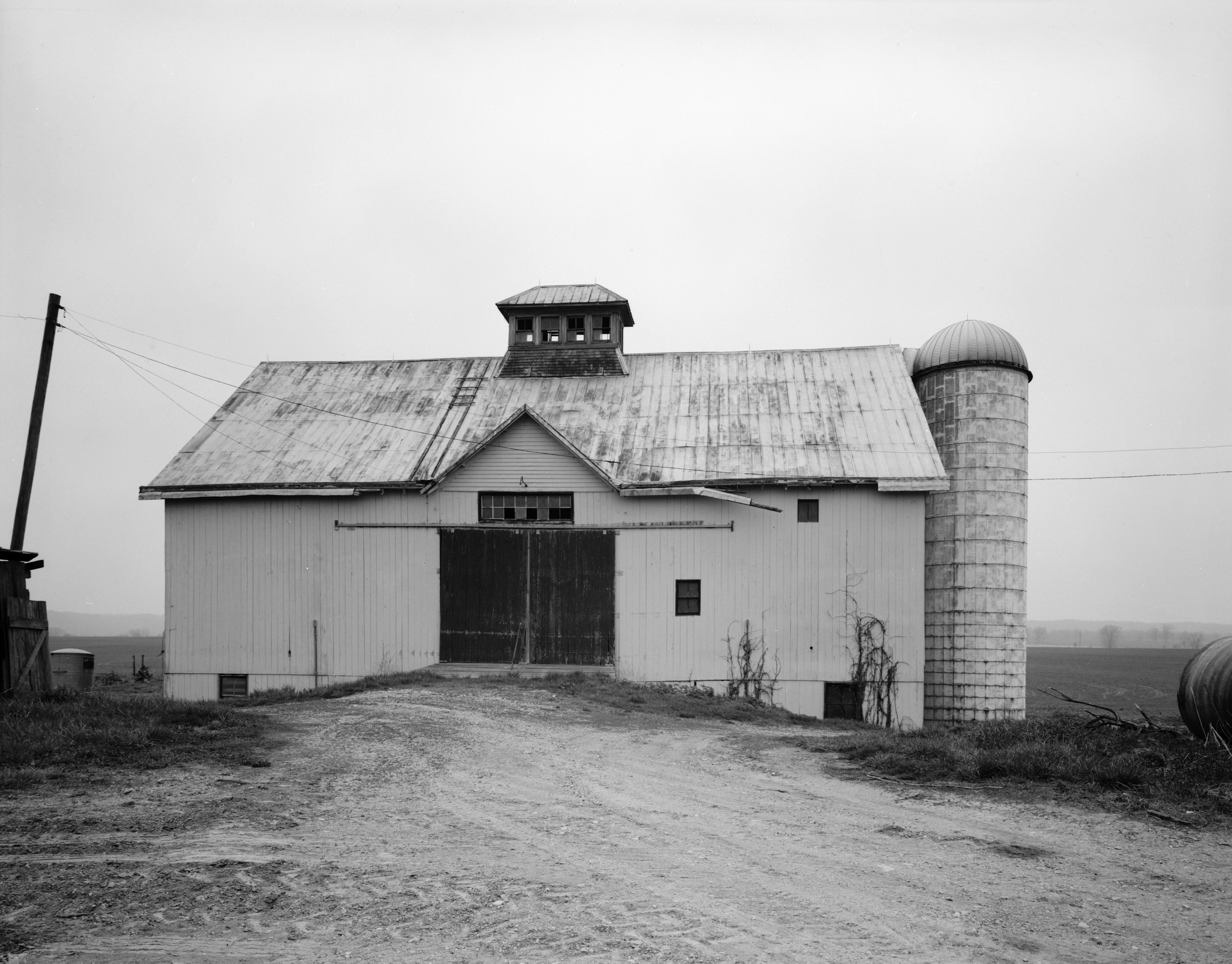
- Merit–Tandy Farmstead, HABS photo, 1982

- Location within Indiana Location within the United States
- Location: Northeast of Patriot on State Road 156, Posey Township, Switzerland County, Indiana
- Coordinates: 38°52′05″N 84°47′35″W
- Area: 4 acres (1.6 ha)
- Built: c. 1845
- Architectural style: Federal, Influence
- NRHP reference No.: 77000021
- Added to NRHP: April 29, 1977

Merit–Tandy Farmstead, also known as the Tandy-Tillotson House, is a historic home and farm located in Posey Township, Switzerland County, Indiana. The house is situated on a hill overlooking the Ohio River. It was built about 1845, and is a one-story, five-bay, Federal style square brick dwelling. Also on the property are the contributing ice house (c. 1845), a large wooden barn, and well house.

It was listed on the National Register of Historic Places in 1977.
