= Jefferson Township, Switzerland County, Indiana =

Jefferson Township
- Township
- Location in Switzerland County
- Coordinates: 38°47′47″N 85°03′08″W
- Country: United States
- State: Indiana
- County: Switzerland

Government
  - Type: Indiana township

Area
  - Total: 37.2 sq mi (96 km^{2})
  - Land: 36.96 sq mi (95.7 km^{2})
  - Water: 0.24 sq mi (0.62 km^{2}) 0.65%
- Elevation: 719 ft (219 m)

Population (2020)
  - Total: 3,203
  - Density: 86.66/sq mi (33.46/km^{2})
- ZIP codes: 47011, 47020, 47043
- GNIS feature ID: 453499

Jefferson Township is one of six townships in Switzerland County, Indiana, United States. As of the 2020 census, its population was 3,203 and it contained 1,549 housing units.

Historical population
Census	Pop.	Note	%±
1890	3,491		—
1900	3,350		−4.0%
1910	2,713		−19.0%
1920	2,516		−7.3%
1930	2,401		−4.6%
1940	2,441		1.7%
1950	2,542		4.1%
1960	2,532		−0.4%
1970	2,365		−6.6%
1980	2,487		5.2%
1990	2,657		6.8%
2000	3,111		17.1%
2010	3,167		1.8%
2020	3,203		1.1%
Source: US Decennial Census

== Geography ==
According to the 2010 census, the township has a total area of 37.2 square miles (96 km^{2}), of which 36.96 square miles (95.7 km^{2}) (or 99.35%) is land and 0.24 square miles (0.62 km^{2}) (or 0.65%) is water.

=== Cities, towns, villages ===
- Vevay

=== Unincorporated towns ===
- Center Square at 38.83645°N 85.03134°W
- Jacksonville at 38.82895°N 85.04884°W
- Mount Sterling at 38.795895°N 85.073840°W

(This list is based on USGS data and may include former settlements.)

=== Adjacent townships ===
- Cotton Township (northeast)
- York Township (east)
- Craig Township (southwest)
- Pleasant Township (northwest)

=== Major highways ===
- Indiana State Road 56

=== Rivers ===
- Ohio River

== School districts ==
- Switzerland County School Corporation

== Political districts ==
- Indiana's 9th congressional district
- State House District 68
- State Senate District 45
