= Moorefield =

Moorefield may refer to:

== Places ==
=== United States ===
- Moorefield, Arkansas
- Moorefield, Indiana
- Moorefield, Kentucky
- Moorefield, Nebraska
- Moorefield, Ohio
- Moorefield, West Virginia
  - Battle of Moorefield, on August 7, 1864 in the American Civil War

=== Republic of Ireland ===
- Moorefield, area of Newbridge, County Kildare
  - Moorefield GAA, GAA club in Kildare

=== Canada ===
- Moorefield, a former local service district now part of the city of Miramichi, New Brunswick
- Moorefield, Ontario

== Other uses ==
- Moorefield (system on chip), code name for an Intel Atom system on chip platform
- Olive Moorefield (born 1932), American singer and actress
- Virgil Moorefield (born 1956), drummer, composer and former student of Paul Lansky
