= Pleasant Township, Switzerland County, Indiana =

Pleasant Township
- Township
- Location in Switzerland County
- Coordinates: 38°51′33″N 85°09′12″W
- Country: United States
- State: Indiana
- County: Switzerland

Government
  - Type: Indiana township

Area
  - Total: 45.58 sq mi (118.1 km^{2})
  - Land: 45.51 sq mi (117.9 km^{2})
  - Water: 0.07 sq mi (0.18 km^{2}) 0.15%
- Elevation: 869 ft (265 m)

Population (2020)
  - Total: 1,312
  - Density: 28.83/sq mi (11.13/km^{2})
- ZIP codes: 47011, 47043, 47224, 47250
- GNIS feature ID: 453750

Pleasant Township is one of six townships in Switzerland County, Indiana, United States. As of the 2020 census, its population was 1,312 and it contained 528 housing units.

Historical population
Census	Pop.	Note	%±
1890	1,784		—
1900	1,762		−1.2%
1910	1,568		−11.0%
1920	1,474		−6.0%
1930	1,284		−12.9%
1940	1,183		−7.9%
1950	1,046		−11.6%
1960	982		−6.1%
1970	819		−16.6%
1980	1,039		26.9%
1990	1,076		3.6%
2000	1,260		17.1%
2010	1,521		20.7%
2020	1,312		−13.7%
Source: US Decennial Census

== Geography ==
According to the 2010 census, the township has a total area of 45.58 square miles (118.1 km^{2}), of which 45.51 square miles (117.9 km^{2}) (or 99.85%) is land and 0.07 square miles (0.18 km^{2}) (or 0.15%) is water.

=== Unincorporated towns ===
- Aaron at 38.883115°N 85.125787°W
- Avonburg at 38.886444°N 85.172177°W
- Bennington at 38.858948°N 85.140509°W
- Moorefield at 38.805616°N 85.170231°W
- Pleasant at 38.870892°N 85.183844°W

(This list is based on USGS data and may include former settlements.)

=== Adjacent townships ===
- Pike Township, Ohio County (northeast)
- Cotton Township (east)
- Jefferson Township (southeast)
- Craig Township (south)
- Milton Township, Jefferson County (southwest)
- Shelby Township, Jefferson County (west)
- Brown Township, Ripley County (northwest)

=== Cemeteries ===
The township contains these four cemeteries: Bear Creek, Pleasant Grove, Slawson and Union.

== School districts ==
- Switzerland County School Corporation

== Political districts ==
- Indiana's 9th congressional district
- State House District 68
- State Senate District 45
