= Posey Township, Switzerland County, Indiana =

Posey Township
- Township
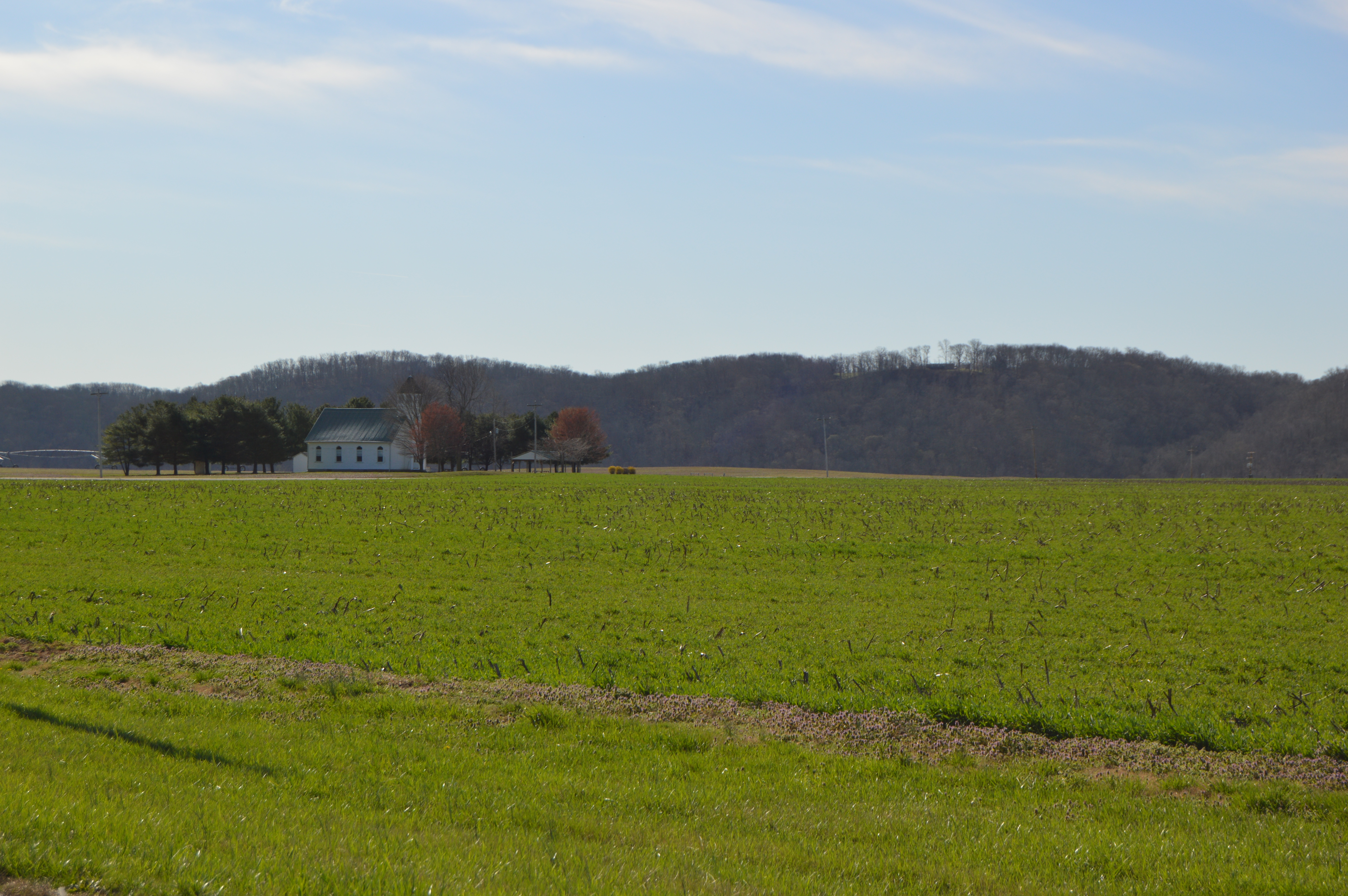
- Fields in Egypt Bottom along State Road 156

- Location in Switzerland County
- Coordinates: 38°51′18″N 84°52′16″W
- Country: United States
- State: Indiana
- County: Switzerland

Government
  - Type: Indiana township

Area
  - Total: 40.82 sq mi (105.7 km^{2})
  - Land: 39.18 sq mi (101.5 km^{2})
  - Water: 1.64 sq mi (4.2 km^{2}) 4.02%
- Elevation: 791 ft (241 m)

Population (2020)
  - Total: 1,576
  - Density: 40.22/sq mi (15.53/km^{2})
- ZIP code: 47038
- GNIS feature ID: 453766

Posey Township is one of six townships in Switzerland County, Indiana, United States. As of the 2020 census, its population was 1,576 and it contained 653 housing units.

Historical population
Census	Pop.	Note	%±
1890	2,253		—
1900	1,953		−13.3%
1910	1,633		−16.4%
1920	1,462		−10.5%
1930	1,379		−5.7%
1940	1,419		2.9%
1950	1,300		−8.4%
1960	1,201		−7.6%
1970	921		−23.3%
1980	1,149		24.8%
1990	1,323		15.1%
2000	1,504		13.7%
2010	1,779		18.3%
2020	1,576		−11.4%
Source: US Decennial Census

== History ==
The Merit-Tandy Farmstead was listed on the National Register of Historic Places in 1977.

== Geography ==
According to the 2010 census, the township has a total area of 40.82 square miles (105.7 km^{2}), of which 39.18 square miles (101.5 km^{2}) (or 95.98%) is land and 1.64 square miles (4.2 km^{2}) (or 4.02%) is water.

=== Cities, towns, villages ===
- Patriot

=== Unincorporated towns ===
- Gurley Corner at 38.859229°N 84.858282°W
- Quercus Grove at 38.853395°N 84.922727°W
- Searcy Crossroads at 38.846729°N 84.858004°W

(This list is based on USGS data and may include former settlements.)

=== Adjacent townships ===
- Randolph Township, Ohio County (north)
- York Township (southwest)
- Cotton Township (west)

=== Cemeteries ===
The township contains these ten cemeteries: Antioch, Bark Works, Concord, Eastview, Grant Brothers, Jack, McNutt, Mead, Munger and Wigal.

== School districts ==
- Switzerland County School Corporation

== Political districts ==
- Indiana's 9th congressional district
- State House District 68
- State Senate District 45
