= Center Square =

Center Square may refer to:

- Centre Square, the area on which Philadelphia City Hall is built, in Pennsylvania
  - Dilworth Park, the western side of the original Centre Square
- Centre Square (building), an office complex in Philadelphia
- Center Square, Indiana, an unincorporated place
- Center Square, Albany, New York, a neighborhood
- The Center Square, an American web news site

== See also ==
- Centre Square Mall
