= John Shaw Billings =

Librarian, building designer and surgeon

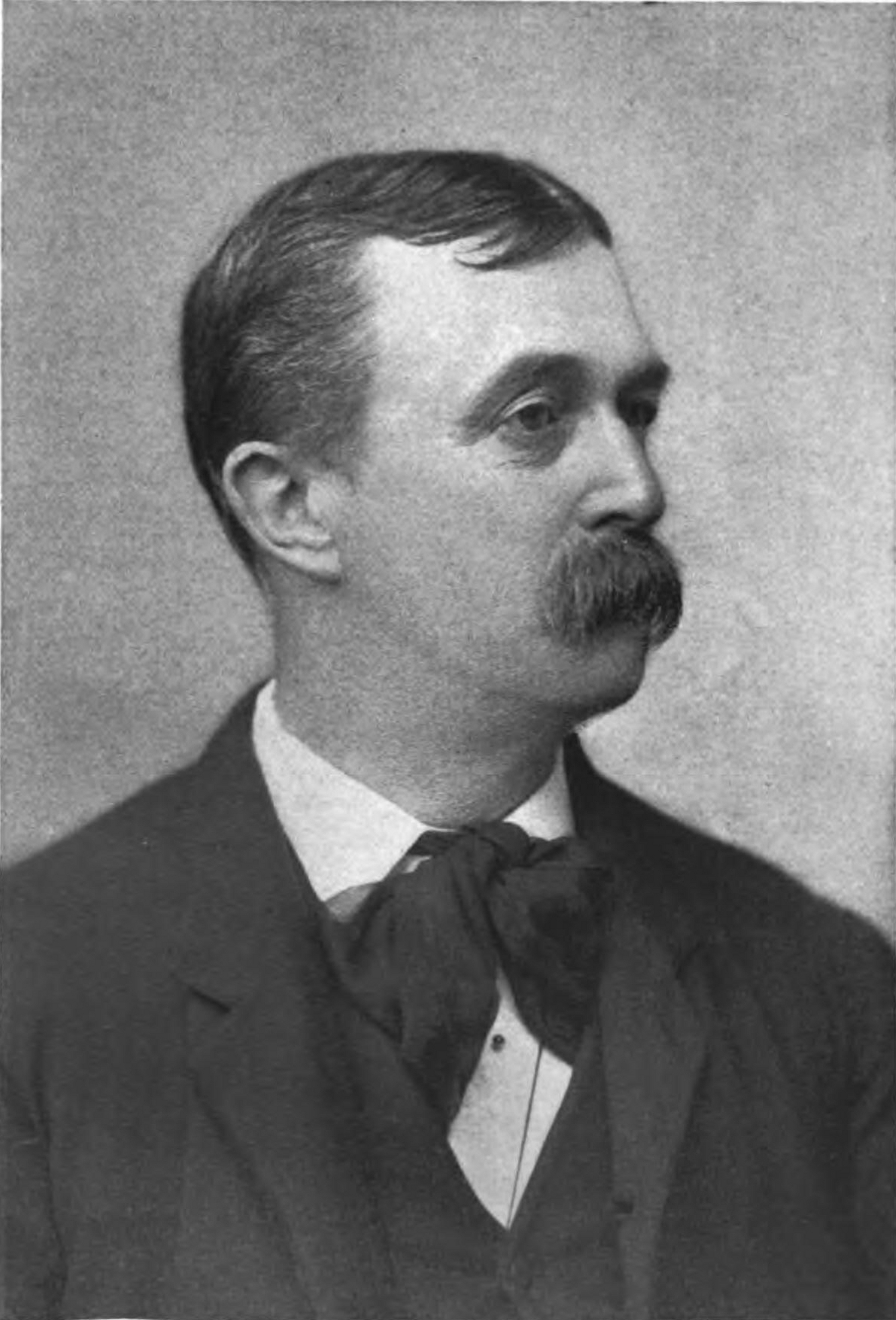
- Billings, c. 1896

President of the American Library Association
- In office 1901–1902
- Preceded by: Henry James Carr
- Succeeded by: James Kendall Hosmer

Personal details
- Born: April 12, 1838 Allensville, Indiana, U.S.
- Died: March 11, 1913 (aged 74) New York City, U.S.
- Resting place: Arlington National Cemetery (Arlington County, Virginia)
- Spouse: Kate M. Stevens (m. 1862; died 1912)
- Children: 5
- Education: Miami University; Medical College of Ohio
- Occupation: Librarian; surgeon

Military service
- Allegiance: United States
- Branch/service: Union Army
- Rank: First lieutenant
- Unit: Army of the Potomac
- Battles/wars: American Civil War

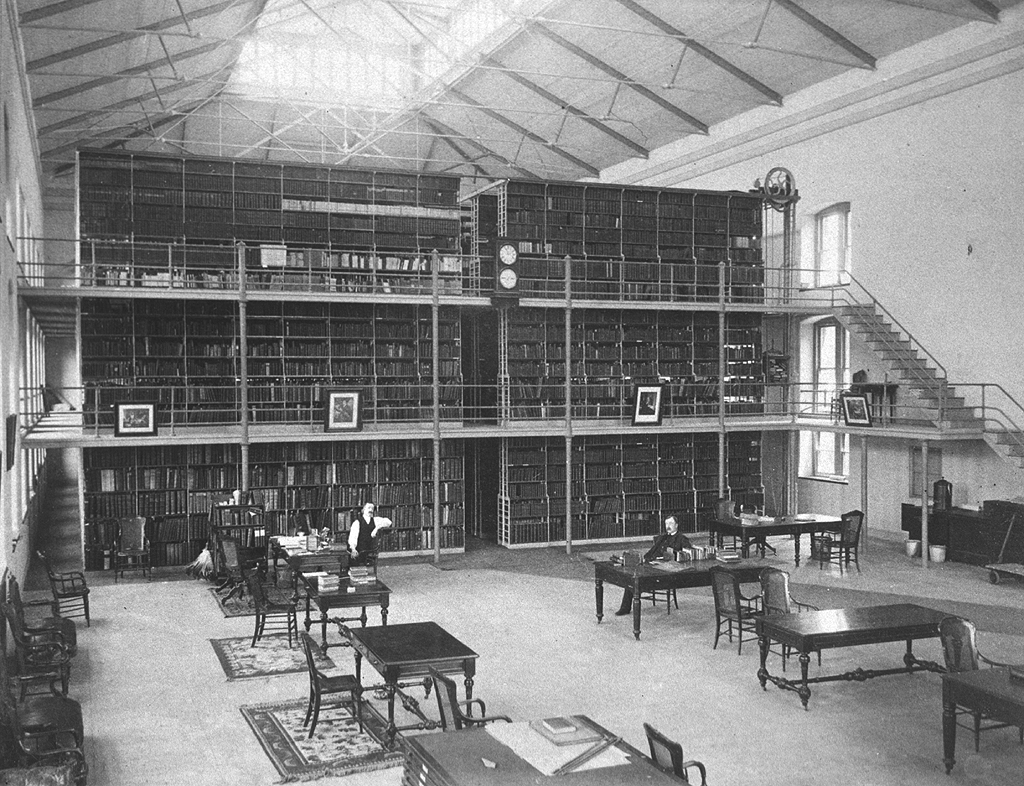
Surgeon General's Library developed by John Shaw Billings

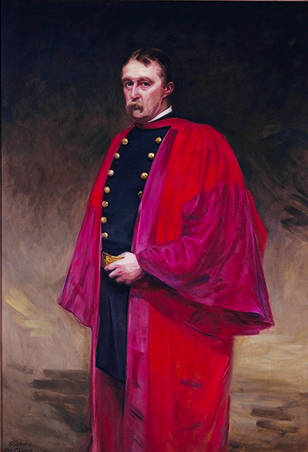
Portrait in the National Library of Medicine by Cecilia Beaux 1895

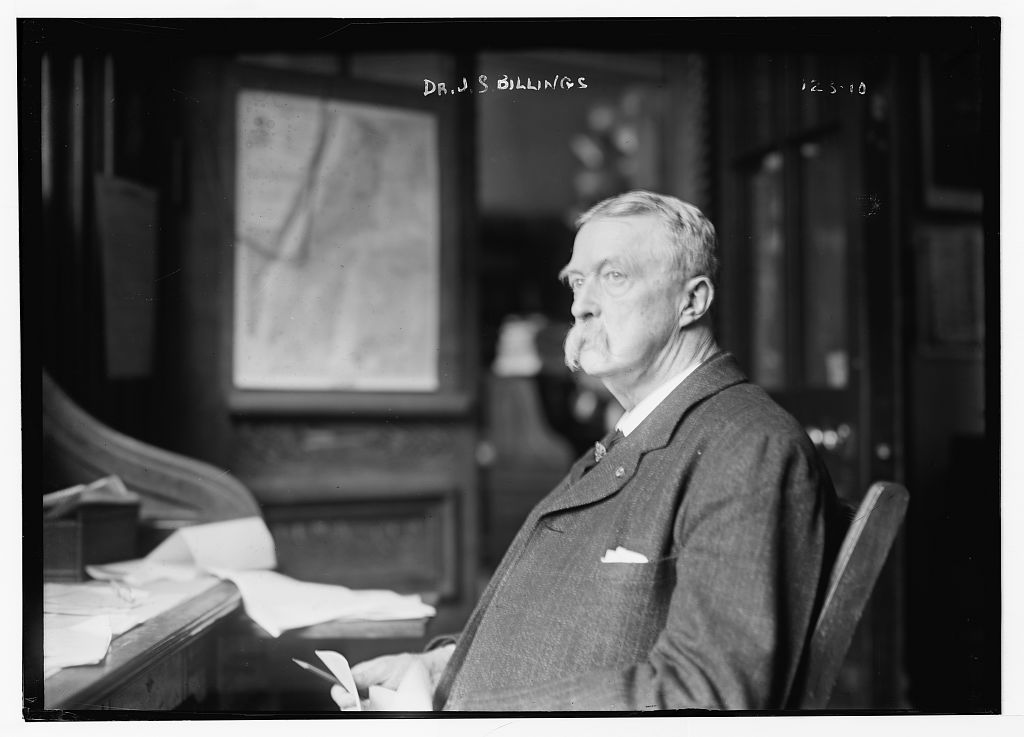
Dr. J.S. Billings, at his desk

John Shaw Billings (April 12, 1838 – March 11, 1913) was an American librarian, building designer, and surgeon who modernized the Library of the Surgeon General's Office in the United States Army. His work with Andrew Carnegie led to the development and his service as the first director of the New York Public Library. Billings oversaw the building of the Surgeon General's Library, which was the nation's first comprehensive library for medicine.

Because of his approach to improving public health and hospitals, Billings was asked to head the U.S. Census Bureau's Vital Statistics division, where he oversaw statistical compilation of censuses. With Robert Fletcher, Billings developed Index Medicus, a monthly guide to contemporary medicine that was published for sixteen months until Billings' retirement from the Medical Museum and Library.

Billings aided the U.S. Secretary of the Treasury in adjusting the organization of the military hospitals. With his growing credibility in the medical field, Billings oversaw work done to aid those struggling with yellow fever. He also served as medical advisor to Johns Hopkins Hospital in Baltimore, and authored reports regarding criteria for medical and nursing curricula and hospital design. Billings made notable contributions to Johns Hopkins Hospital's architecture, infrastructure, and curriculum for the Johns Hopkins School of Medicine.

== Early life and education ==
Billings was born on April 12, 1838, in Allensville, Indiana. In the century before, his father's family moved to Syracuse, New York, after leaving England in 1654. His father was born in Saratoga, New York, and was kin of William Billings. Billings' mother, Abby Shaw Billings, was born in Raynham, Massachusetts. In 1843, Billings' family moved to Rhode Island, but in 1848 returned to Allensville, Indiana due to his father's relocation as a postmaster.

During his childhood, Billings received education in both Providence, Rhode Island and Indiana. He inherited his mother's love for reading and learned Latin and Greek. Due to his love for learning and education, he agreed to renounce any inheritance if his father allowed him to attend college. In 1852, at the age of fourteen, Billings entered Miami University in Oxford, Ohio. Through his five years at the university, he spent most of his time reading in the library. In 1857, Billings graduated from Miami University second in his class and was admitted a year later to Cincinnati's Medical College of Ohio, today the University of Cincinnati College of Medicine. Billings received his medical degree in 1860. His thesis, The Surgical Treatment of Epilepsy, drew attention from the faculty as an accurate description of the operations implemented at the time.

== Career ==
Billings relocated to Cincinnati, where he began a surgical practice. Hoping to improve hospital service on the battlefield, he became the anatomy demonstrator at the Cincinnati's Medical College. However, in 1861, he declined an offer to become a surgeon assistant. Instead in 1861, Billings went in for an examination for the regular army, becoming first of his class. However, no vacant spots were available in the regular corps, so he was appointed to be an assistant surgeon in Union Hospital in Georgetown in Washington, D.C. The year after, on April 16, Billings was commissioned first lieutenant, and then took charge of Cliffburne Hospital's development in Georgetown after Union Hospital's operations relocated to Cliffburne. In August of that year, he was transferred to Satterlee General Hospital, a new hospital in West Philadelphia.

After serving as the executive officer at the hospital for several months, he was directed to the Army of the Potomac in March 1863 and was assigned to Sykes' Division of Meade's Corps in the 11th Infantry Regiment.

After the Civil War, Billings assumed direction of the Army Surgeon General's library from about 1867 to 1895. During this time, Billings expanded the library from 2,300 to 124,000 volumes, making it the largest medical library in the Americas. When Billings inherited the library, its contents were listed primarily by author and secondarily by subject. Billings redesigned the catalog with author and subject indexes. However, his catalog could not meet the demands of increased publications, so he created a separate indexing system for medical periodicals, which became known as the Index Medicus.

Billings supervised the collection and tabulation of vital statistics for the 1880 and 1890 censuses and worked with the compilation of statistics. He played an important role as he introduced the punch-card system of calculating vital statistics with electro-mechanical methods, which was then implemented into the 1890 census; indeed, it was his idea that led to Herman Hollerith designing the initial punch-card tabulator that is often credited with inaugurating the development of modern computers.

After he left the Surgeon General's Office, he united the libraries in New York City between 1896 and 1913 to form the New York Public Library. The punch-card system he introduced in the U.S. censuses was further used in the New York Public Library construction. Billings inspired Andrew Carnegie to provide $5 million for the construction of sixty-five branch libraries throughout New York City and 2,509 libraries in cities and towns across North America and Great Britain. During the library's construction, Billings directed the re-cataloging of the works from the Lenox, Tilden, and Astor Foundations, which were used to form the Library in 1895. Billings also recruited a young man named Harry Miller Lydenberg to work as his personal assistant and head of reference. Lydenberg expanded upon the collection practices of Billings, and eventually served as Director of NYPL from 1934 to 1941.

Billings was the senior editor of books reporting the work of the Committee of Fifty to Investigate the Liquor Problem in the early 1900s. The committee researched the activities and publications of the Department of Scientific Temperance Instruction of the Woman's Christian Temperance Union (WCTU).

== Johns Hopkins University ==
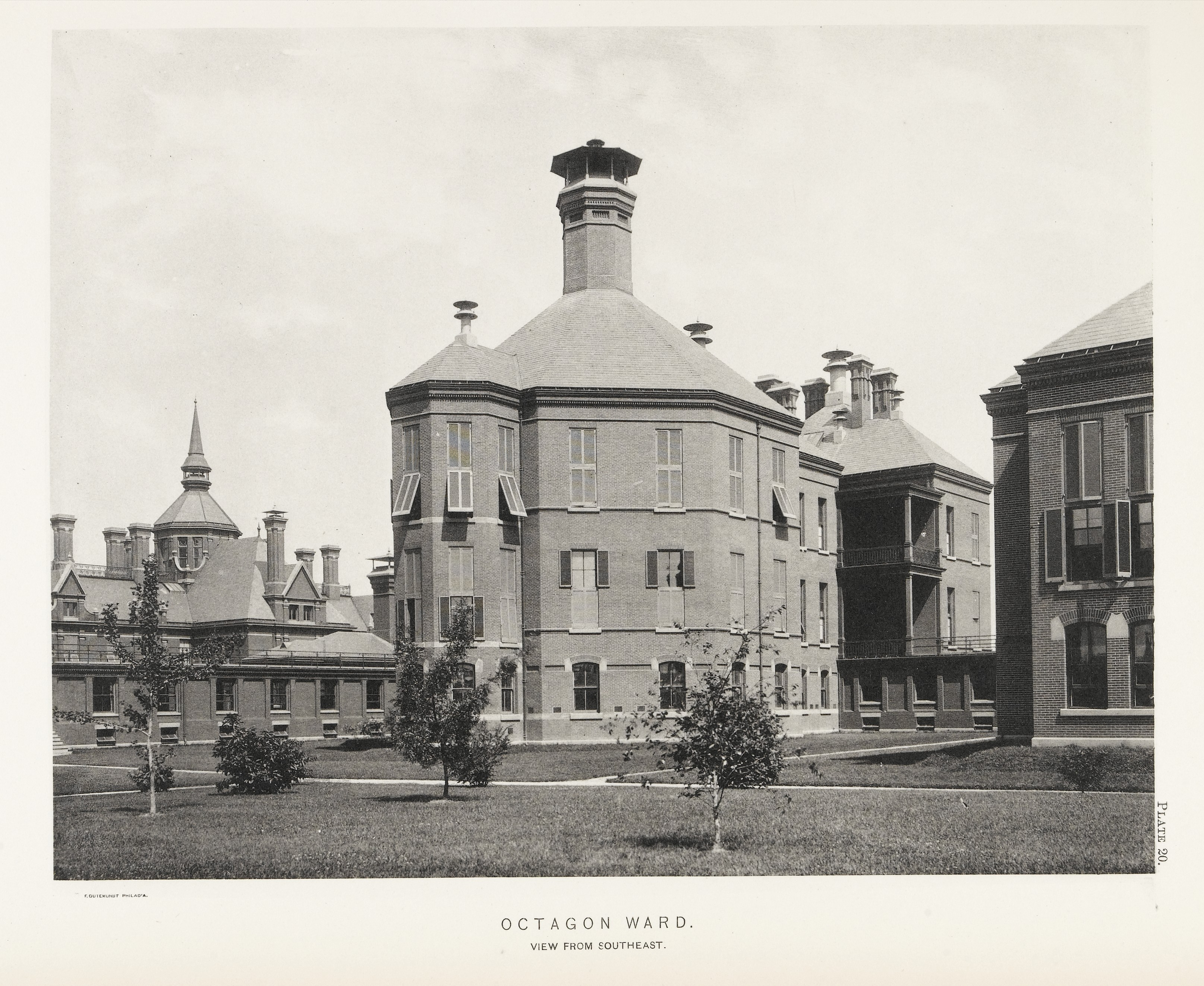
An exterior view of the Octagon Ward at Johns Hopkins Hospital in Baltimore, which became one of Billings' premier designs of the hospital.

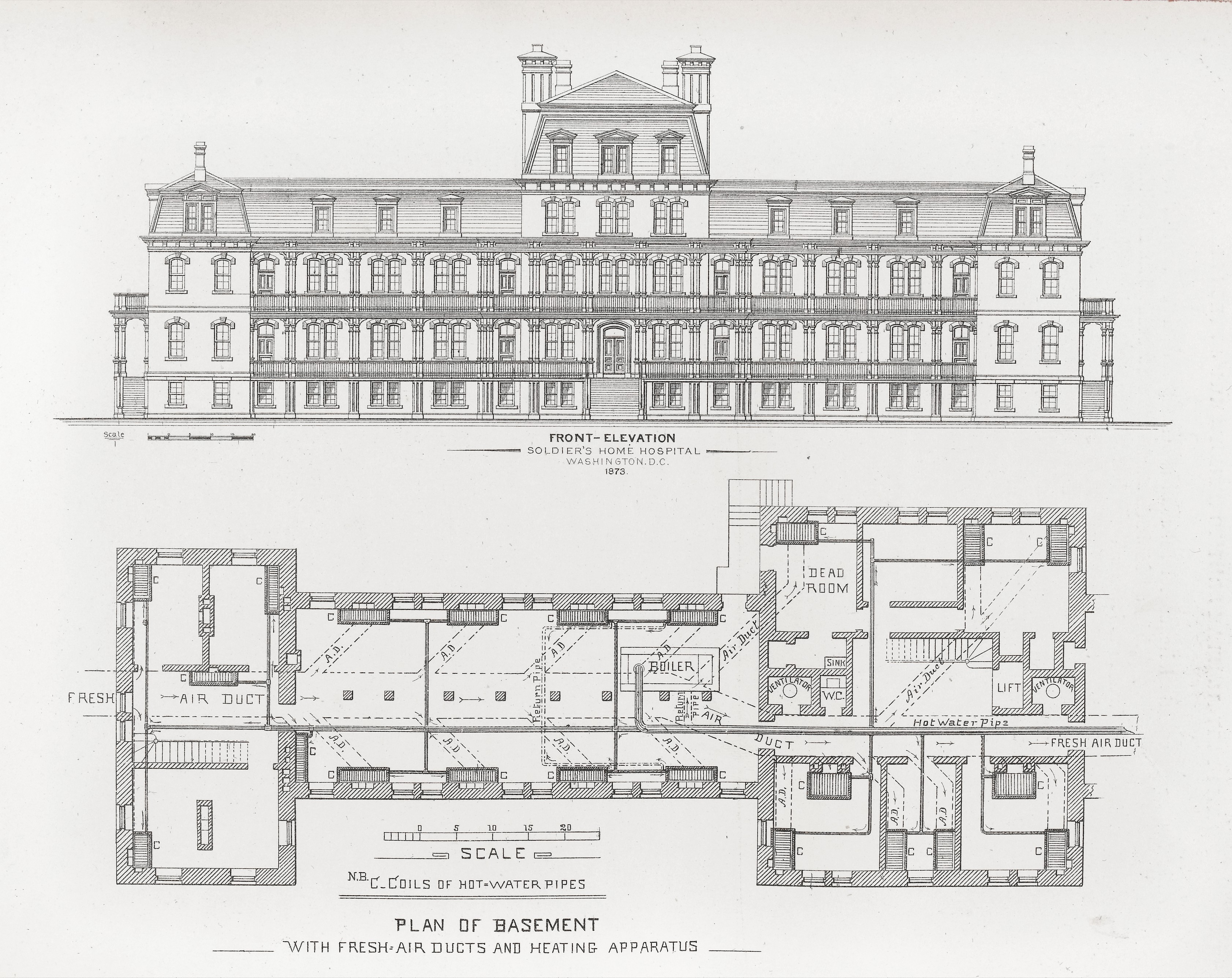
John Shaw Billings' architectural plans for Soldier's Home Hospital in Washington, D.C., which utilized a basement with fresh air ducts and a heating apparatus and was incorporated in Billings' designs of Johns Hopkins Hospital.

Billings' involvement with Johns Hopkins University in Baltimore began in the late 1870s with the initiation of his plans for the hospital and ended in 1889 with his rejection of the position of hospital superintendent.

Billings is renowned for his work of planning the construction of Johns Hopkins Hospital. He is credited with designing the original buildings of Johns Hopkins Hospital, which opened in 1889, as well as conducting the national and international search for the initial faculty for Johns Hopkins University. He drafted organization and construction plans for the hospital in 1873 and also recommended the construction pavilion plan, which soon became a plan utilized across the nation.

The design of the hospital was inspired by Billings' trips to several hospitals throughout Europe, where he learned the importance of cleanliness. He took European ideas of ventilation and applied them in the context of the hospital's environment, which was a crucial factor to consider in light of Baltimore's varying weather. In addition, Billings' intentionally included electrical wiring in his plans, at a time where electricity was not fully accessible by the hospital, highlighting his capacities in design. It is due to his contributions that the building with the hospital's trademark dome was subsequently named for Billings.

Billings was involved in the hospital's infrastructure, as he wrote numerous reports regarding the training of hospital staff and the organization of the hospital administration. He understood the importance of choosing who works in the hospital. By hiring the right people, Billings believed a lot of medical errors could be avoided, thus improving the efficacy of the hospital. One of such people was William Henry Welch, whom he recommended to President Daniel Coit Gilman for hiring.

Billings served as the primary advisor to Gilman, in charge of engineering and implementing the initial educational infrastructure of Johns Hopkins School of Medicine. During a time when masses of students were trained to become doctors, Billings made decisions to ensure the quality of the students who entered and graduated the School of Medicine. To achieve this, Billings harshened entrance requirements by requiring a bachelor's degree. Furthermore, he proposed that the curriculum be a four-year program consisting of small-sized classes.

Billings' proposed medical curricula and partitioning of faculty into departments based on specialties laid the foundation for the resurgence of modern medical schools in the United States. Department chairs of the medical school were jointly the heads of services at the Hopkins hospital, allowing both organizations to benefit from their expertise. Billings also played a significant role in the determination of the philosophy, structure, organization, and faculty of the Johns Hopkins Medical School.

Billings emphasized Hopkins' Medical School's unique location in Baltimore as something to be taken fully advantage of, knowing its potential for research about illnesses as well as the capacity to treat them effectively. Billings' therefore pressed for clinical laboratories at the School of Medicine, an idea inspired by other prestigious institutions such as Harvard and schools in Michigan and Pennsylvania.

== Scientific contributions ==
Between 1869 and 1874, Billings was asked by the Secretary of the Treasury to inspect and report upon the hygienic conditions of the Marine Hospital Service. With this appointment, Billings was required to travel across the United States in order to inspect and provide recommendations for improving the sanitations policies of the hospitals. In accordance to Billings' recommendations, the Secretary of the Treasury acknowledged Billings' contributions to improving the hospitals by saying, "The condition of the marine hospitals has been improved during the past year. This result is largely due to Dr. J. S. Billings, of the Surgeon-General's Office, who has visited nearly all of them, and through whose advice many important changes have been made." His main contribution to the hospital service was take the organization methods out of political hands and affiliate it with those with military methods of organization. This became known as the Public Health Service, which is the branch of government that works with the medical personnel of the Army and Navy to further preventive medicine.

== Yellow fever ==
In 1879, Billings with Dr. Charles F. Folsom, Colonel George E. Waring Jr., and other members of the National Board of Health surveyed citizens of Memphis, Tennessee, in order to gather data regarding the outbreak of yellow fever in the city. His recommendations to the city board members regarding the sanitation policies were described as a "miracle tonic" by local newspapers as yellow fever cases dropped following his visit. Billings details his findings about the disease in his article found in the International Review in January, 1880. In his article, he outlines the cause of the disease to be "a minute organism somewhat like the yeast plant, or it may be the product of such an organism, like alcohol". In addition to detailing the probable cause of the disease, Billings also wrote about observations he saw regarding the patients. These observations included where they had contracted they illness, physical symptoms, and possible transmission. He elaborates on the transmission process by saying in his article, "yellow fever can't go anywhere unless yer tote it", which served as the early theory for spread of yellow fever by mosquitoes.

== National Library of Medicine ==
A senior surgeon in the war, Billings built the Library of the Surgeon General's Office, which is now the National Library of Medicine and is the centerpiece of modern medical information systems. Billings figured out how to analyze medical and demographic data mechanically by turning it into numbers and punching onto cardboard cards as developed by his assistant at the Census Office, Herman Hollerith. This was the origin of the computer punch card system that dominated statistical data manipulation until the 1970s. The punch cards were first used when Billings acted as a supervisor for the eleventh (1890) census, and were quickly adapted by census bureaus, insurance companies and large corporations around the world. He came up with the idea for the library when working on his doctoral thesis when he discovered that there was not one library that had the resources needed for his research. To fix this, John Shaw Billings built a collection and also created Index-catalogues. By the time Billings retired from the army, he had already collected 116,847 books and 191,598 pamphlets. This collection made up the National Library of Medicine and it has grown ever since.

== Billings' Building ==
Billings was known for his expertise in hospital construction since the American Civil War. He played a significant role in designing the Johns Hopkins Hospital in Baltimore, making the plans and perfecting the layout perfect for teaching. Billings also helped plan the building of six other institutions, including another hospital. He is recognized for the contributions he made to the U.S. Army. His successful organization of army hospitals set him up for a continuing career in hospital planning. Despite many changes since opening in 1889, the main entrance of Johns Hopkins Hospital remains the same and is known as the Billing's Building.

== Awards and honors ==
- Member of the United States National Academy of Sciences in 1883.
- Honorary fellowship from the Royal College of Surgeons in Ireland in 1892.
- Member of the American Antiquarian Society in 1899.
- Trustee of the Carnegie Institution from 1902 to 1913.
- Associate fellow at the American Academy of Arts and Sciences in 1912.
- Member of the American Philosophical Society in 1913.

== Personal life ==
Billings married Kate M. Stevens on September 3, 1862, in St. John's Church, in Georgetown. They had five children. His wife died on August 19, 1912, which was a tremendous blow to Billings.

During the last several years of his life, he developed a cancer of the lip in 1890 and was diagnosed with biliary calculus, causing him to undergo operation for his cancer and for the removal of his gallbladder.

== Death ==
Billings died of pneumonia on March 11, 1913, following an operation for urinary calculus at the age of 74 in New York City. He was buried at Arlington National Cemetery with military honors.

His portrait, painted by Cecilia Beaux, hangs in the Main Reading Room of the U.S. National Library of Medicine, where several collections of his papers are located.

== Works ==
Among his publications are:

- "House-Drainage from Various Points of View" . Popular Science Monthly. Vol. 34. January 1889. ISSN 0161-7370 – via Wikisource.
- Billings, John (1884). The principles of ventilation and heating, and their practical application (PDF). New York: The Sanitary engineer. OL 20621328M. (NLM) 63110980R.
- Mortality and Vital Statistics of the United States (1885)
- Medical Museums (1888) Online at Google Books
- National Medical Dictionary (Two volumes, 1889)
- Billings, John (1890). Description of the Johns Hopkins Hospital. Baltimore: [Press of I. Friedenwald]. (NLM) 68110400R.
- Social Statistics of Cities (Six volumes, for the eleventh census)
- Billings, John (June 17, 1902). Some Library Problems of To-Morrow. American Library Association.
- Physiological Aspects of the Liquor Problem (1903)

== Notes ==
Non-profit organization positions
Preceded by Henry James Carr	President of the American Library Association; 1901–1902	Succeeded by James Kendall Hosmer
