= Allenville =

Allenville may refer to:

== Places ==
United States

- Allenville, Michigan
- Allenville, Missouri
- Allenville, Illinois
- Allenville, Wisconsin

== See also ==
- Allensville (disambiguation)
