= Quercus Grove, Indiana =

- Unincorporated community
- Location within Indiana Location within the United States
- Coordinates: 38°51′12″N 84°55′22″W
- Country: United States
- State: Indiana
- County: Switzerland
- Township: Posey
- Elevation: 876 ft (267 m)
- Time zone: UTC-5 (Eastern (EST))
  - Summer (DST): UTC-4 (EDT)
- ZIP code: 47040
- Area codes: 812, 930
- GNIS feature ID: 441694

Quercus Grove is an unincorporated community in Posey Township, Switzerland County, in the U.S. state of Indiana.

== History ==
Quercus Grove was platted in 1816. An old variant name of the community was called Bark Works.

A post office was established at Quercus Grove in 1822, and remained in operation until it was discontinued in 1905.
