= Pleasant, Indiana =

- Unincorporated community
- Location within Indiana Location within the United States
- Coordinates: 38°52′15″N 85°11′02″W
- Country: United States
- State: Indiana
- County: Switzerland
- Township: Pleasant
- Elevation: 951 ft (290 m)
- Time zone: UTC-5 (Eastern (EST))
  - Summer (DST): UTC-4 (EDT)
- ZIP code: 47043
- Area codes: 812, 930
- GNIS feature ID: 441232

Pleasant is an unincorporated community in Pleasant Township, Switzerland County, Indiana, United States.

== History ==
A post office was established at Pleasant in 1829, and remained in operation until it was discontinued in 1917.

== Geography ==
Pleasant is located at the intersection of State Roads 250 and 129.
