= Bennington, Indiana =

- Unincorporated community
- Location within Indiana Location within the United States
- Coordinates: 38°51′32″N 85°8′26″W
- Country: United States
- State: Indiana
- County: Switzerland
- Township: Pleasant
- Elevation: 892 ft (272 m)
- Time zone: UTC-5 (Eastern (EST))
  - Summer (DST): UTC-4 (EDT)
- ZIP code: 47011
- Area codes: 812, 930
- GNIS feature ID: 430820

Bennington is an unincorporated community in central Pleasant Township, Switzerland County, in the U.S. state of Indiana. Although Bennington is unincorporated, it has a post office, with the ZIP code of 47011.

== History ==
An old variant name of the community was called Slawson. A post office was established under this name in 1838 and was renamed to Bennington in 1848. The post office closed in 2009.

== Geography ==
The community lies along the Bennington Pike north of the town of Vevay, the county seat of Switzerland County.

== Notable people ==
- Culla Johnson Vayhinger (1867–1924), temperance reformer, educator, religious and political leader
