= Aaron, Indiana =

- Unincorporated community
- Location within Indiana Location within the United States
- Coordinates: 38°52′59″N 85°07′33″W
- Country: United States
- State: Indiana
- County: Switzerland
- Township: Pleasant
- Elevation: 902 ft (275 m)
- Time zone: UTC-5 (Eastern (EST))
  - Summer (DST): UTC-4 (EDT)
- ZIP code: 47043
- Area codes: 812, 930
- GNIS feature ID: 429980

Aaron is an unincorporated community in Pleasant Township, Switzerland County, in the U.S. state of Indiana.

== History ==
A post office was established at Aaron in 1871, and remained in operation until it was discontinued in 1907.

In 1890, the population was 25 residents. In 1900, the population was 27. By 1920, the population was 60.

== See also ==
- Markland, Indiana
