= Elwood Mead =

American professor, government official and engineer

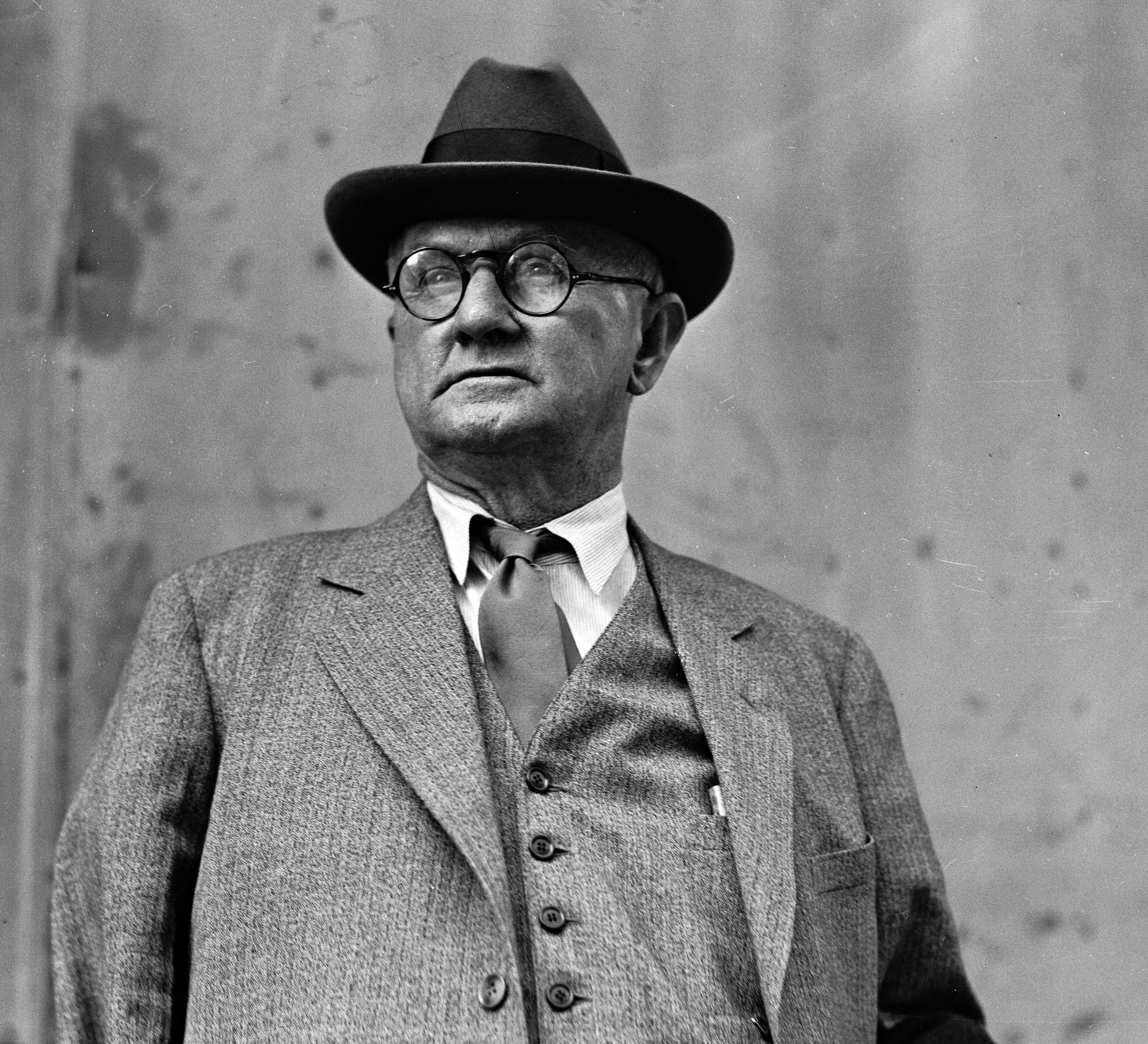

Commissioner of the United States Bureau of Reclamation
- In office 1924 – January 26, 1936
- President: Calvin Coolidge
- Preceded by: David W. Davis
- Succeeded by: Mae A. Schnurr

Personal details
- Born: January 16, 1858; Patriot, Indiana, U.S.
- Died: January 26, 1936 (aged 78); Washington, D.C., U.S.
- Education: Purdue University (BS)

Elwood Mead (January 16, 1858 – January 26, 1936) was an American professor, government official, and engineer known for heading the United States Bureau of Reclamation (USBR) from 1924 until his death in 1936. During his tenure, he oversaw some of the most complex projects the Bureau of Reclamation has undertaken. These included the Hoover, Grand Coulee and Owyhee dams.

== Early life and career ==
Mead was born in Patriot, Indiana, and graduated from Purdue University with a Bachelor of Science in 1882. He worked for the United States Army Corps of Engineers in Indianapolis for seven months and departed for Fort Collins, Colorado, by the end of the year.

== Career ==
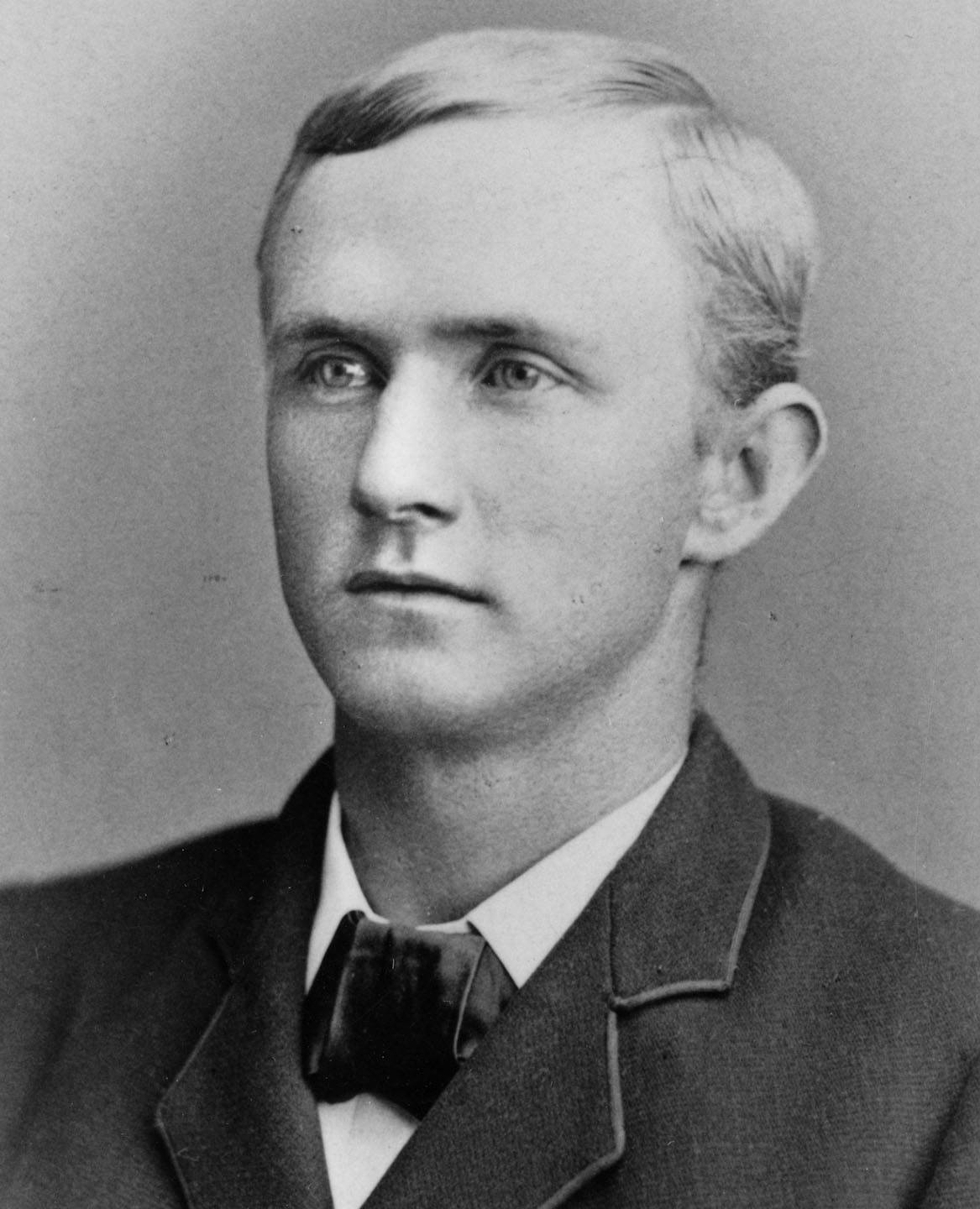
Mead while at Colorado State University

There he started work as a professor by teaching mathematics at Colorado Agricultural College from 1883 until 1884, and again from 1886 to 1888. He developed and taught the first class on irrigation engineering in the United States. Mead also worked for the Colorado State engineer's Office.

=== Public service ===
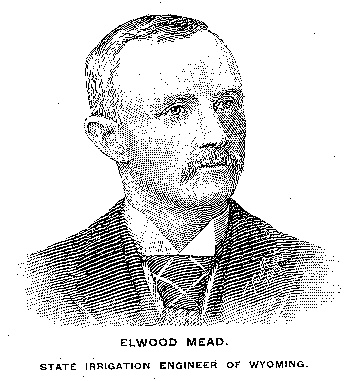
Portrait

In 1888, Mead became the territorial and state engineer of Wyoming. From 1888 until 1899, he was key in drafting the water laws for Wyoming. He was also a prominent supporter of the Cody Canal, one of the nation's first Carey Act projects undertaken by a group of investors, including William F. Cody.

In 1899, Mead was appointed head of irrigation investigations for the United States Department of Agriculture, based out of Cheyenne. There, he had an important role of directing irrigation studies across the west.

In 1907, Mead was appointed chairman of the State Rivers and Water Supply Commission of Victoria, Australia. He served there for four years, though the Australian records show that he continued to work there until May 1915.

In 1911, he returned to the United States to become the professor of rural institutions at the University of California, and chairman of the California Land Settlement Board. His ideas about developing efficient rural communities would later influence what would become the Resettlement Administration communities of the New Deal.

He continued to serve in California until 1924, when he was appointed commissioner of the United States Bureau of Reclamation (USBR) in President Calvin Coolidge's administration. In 1923 and again in 1927, he went to Palestine to help the Zionists develop irrigation and development plans. At the USBR, Mead oversaw the planning and execution of construction of major water control and irrigation projects in the West: the Hoover, Grand Coulee and Owyhee dams.

== Death ==
Mead died on January 26, 1936, at the age of 78 in Washington, D.C., from thrombosis, just four months after the completion of Boulder Dam. Originally interred at Abbey Mausoleum, he was reburied at National Memorial Park in Falls Church, Virginia, in 2001 after the former crypt closed and was demolished.

== Legacy and honors ==
Lake Mead, formed by the construction of the Hoover Dam on the Colorado River, was named after Mead. He is also the namesake to the SS Elwood Mead, a Liberty ship which was launched in 1944.

== See also ==
- National Irrigation Congress
