= Gurley Corner, Indiana =

- Unincorporated community
- Location within Indiana Location within the United States
- Coordinates: 38°51′33″N 84°51′30″W
- Country: United States
- State: Indiana
- County: Switzerland
- Township: Posey
- Elevation: 873 ft (266 m)
- Time zone: UTC-5 (Eastern (EST))
  - Summer (DST): UTC-4 (EDT)
- ZIP code: 47038
- Area codes: 812, 930
- GNIS feature ID: 435560

Gurley Corner is an unincorporated community in Posey Township, Switzerland County, in the U.S. state of Indiana.
