= Mount Sterling, Indiana =

- Unincorporated community
- Location within Indiana Location within the United States
- Coordinates: 38°47′45″N 85°04′26″W
- Country: United States
- State: Indiana
- County: Switzerland
- Township: Jefferson
- Elevation: 797 ft (243 m)
- Time zone: UTC-5 (Eastern (EST))
  - Summer (DST): UTC-4 (EDT)
- ZIP code: 47043
- Area codes: 812, 930
- GNIS feature ID: 439699

Mount Sterling is an unincorporated community in Jefferson Township, Switzerland County, Indiana, United States.

== History ==
A post office was established at Mount Sterling in 1819, and remained in operation until it was discontinued in 1907.
