= Deborah Knox Livingston =

Scottish-born American suffragist; temperance activist (1876–1923)

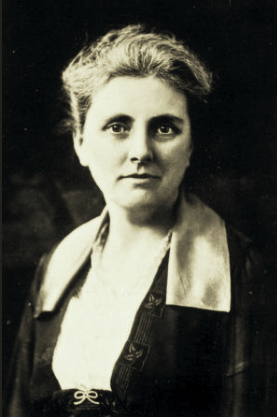
- Born: Deborah King Knox; 1874/76; Glasgow, Scotland
- Died: August 5, 1923; Osterville, Massachusetts, U.S.
- Occupations: Lecturer; temperance activist; suffragist
- Organization: Woman's Christian Temperance Union
- Notable work: Studies in Government
- Spouse: Benjamin Thomson Livingston (m. 1897)

Deborah Knox Livingston (née, Knox; 1876–1923) was a Scottish-born American lecturer associated with temperance and suffrage movements. She spent much of her life in service to the National and World's Woman's Christian Temperance Union (WCTU), as well as the Young Women's Christian Association (YWCA), Federation of Women's Clubs, League of Women Voters, and World League Against Alcoholism (WLAA). In Maine, she served as the chair of the state's Suffrage Campaign Committee, while in Rhode Island, she was President of the state's WCTU. In addition to the textbook, Studies in Government (1921), Livingston was the author of several treatises and articles.

== Early life and education ==
Deborah King Knox was born in Glasgow, Scotland, 1874/76. (Note: Various sources record different dates of birth: September 10, 1874; September 15, 1874; and September 10, 1876.) Her parents were James and Helen (Reid) Knox. Deborah had two older brothers, James V. and Thomas J.

At the age of ten, she left Scotland with her parents, and the family settled in the U.S.

She was educated in the public schools of Glasgow and of Pawtucket, Rhode Island. She graduated from St. Xavier's Academy, Providence, Rhode Island, 1892, and from the New York Missionary Training School (now, Alliance University, 1895.

She became interested in temperance at an early age, having joined a Band of Hope at the age of six.

== Career ==
At the age of 18, she joined the WCTU, and a year later, became president of the local Pawtucket union. Afterward, she was elected president of the First district WCTU of Rhode Island.

She taught school for a short while in southern Rhode Island. During this period, she was introduced to what was to be her life's work by Frances Willard, then President of the National WCTU.

On August 25, 1897, in Pawtucket, she married the Rev. Benjamin Thomson Livingston (1869–1948), a Baptist minister who also emigrated from Scotland, and who became the general secretary of the Evangelistic Association of New England. After marriage, they located in Boston, and during her three years residence there, Livingston was secretary of the city's WCTU.

On her return to Rhode Island, she became president of the WCTU of that State (1904–13), where her zeal and ability for leadership in organization brought her to the attention of the National WCTU.

In 1912, she was called into the service of the National organization as Superintendent of the Department of the Franchise, and in 1913, as Superintendent of Suffrage. In this work, she traveled throughout the U.S., pleading from platform, in legislative halls, on street corners, and in parlor meetings that her gender be given the full privileges of the ballot. By her manner and argument, she won over many audiences opposed to woman suffrage. She was responsible to a large extent in carrying to success the movement that resulted in the Eighteenth Amendment, and helped, also, to create the sentiment that wrote into the Federal Constitution the Nineteenth Amendment.

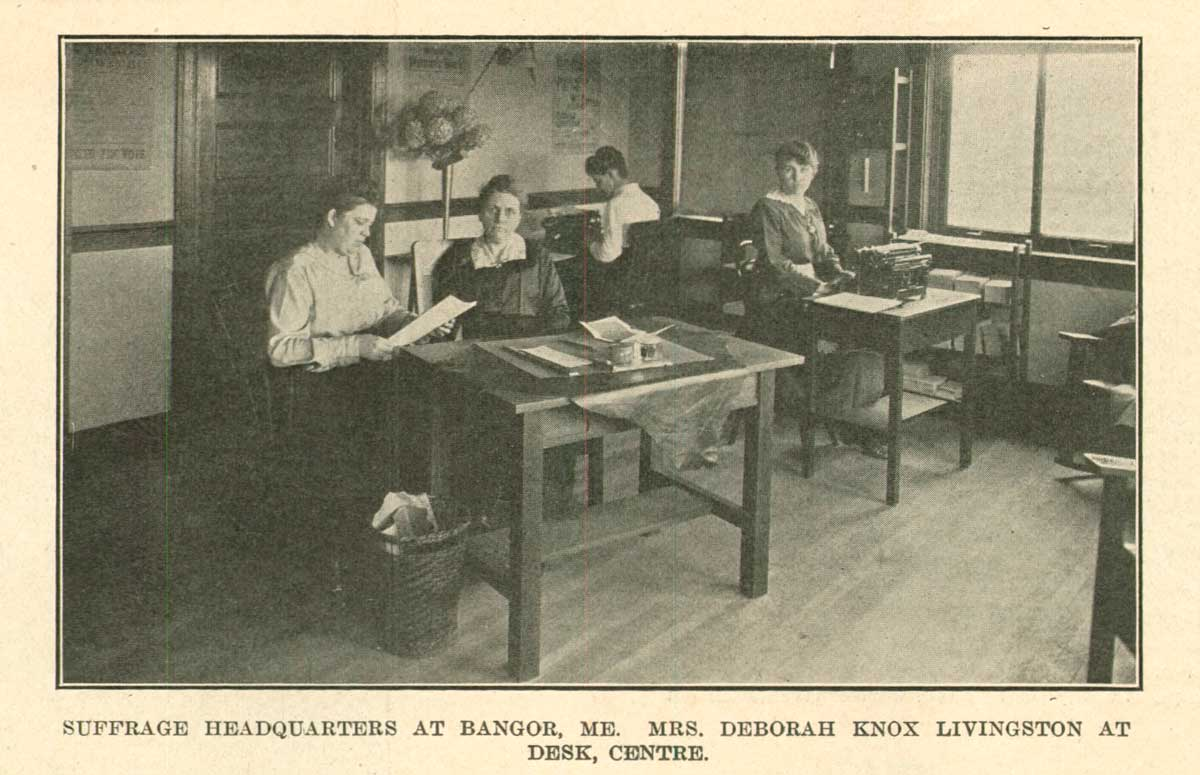
Livingston at center desk, Bangor, Maine, 1917

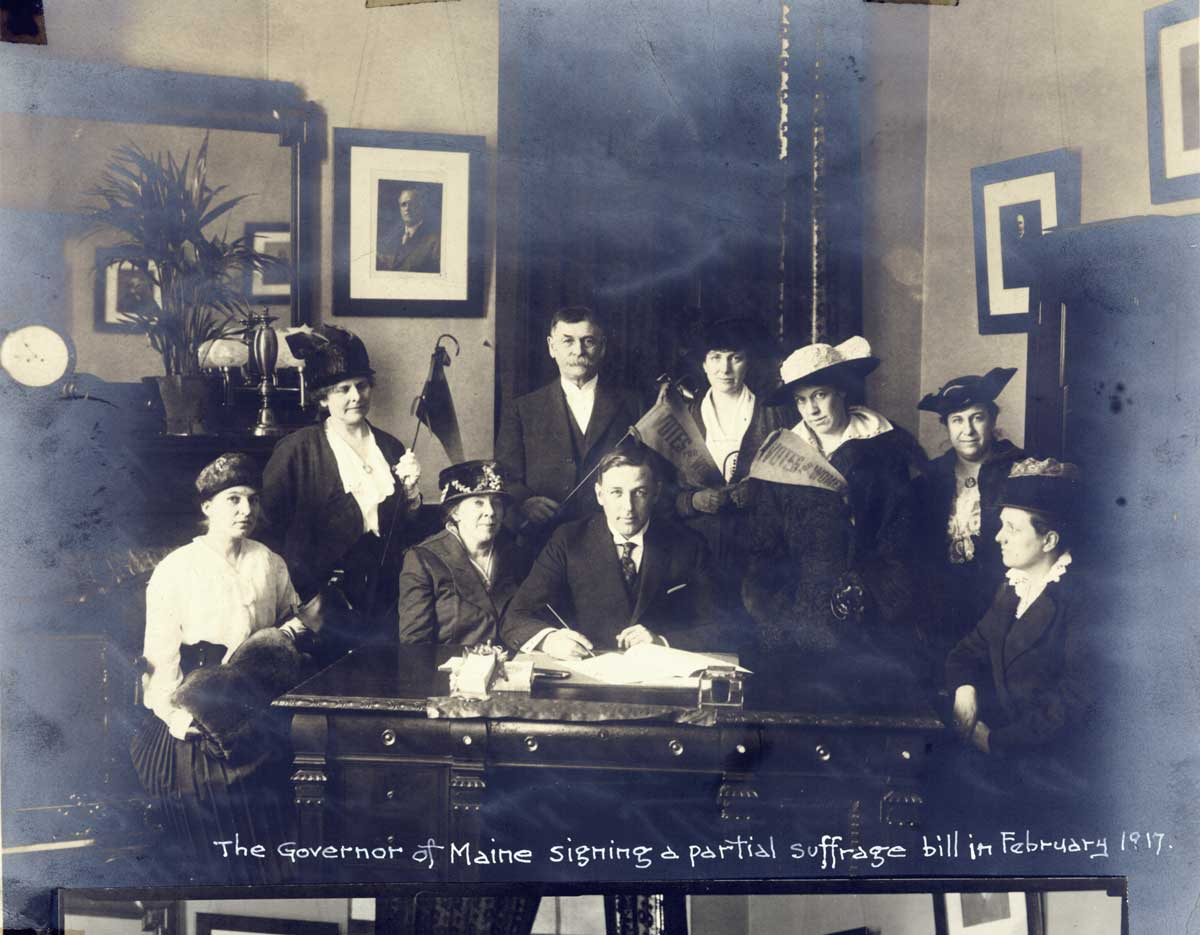
Maine governor, Carl Milliken, signing a partial suffrage bill, February 23, 1917. Livingston is seated, far right.

By 1914, Livingston made her home in Bangor, Maine, where she served as President of the city's YWCA, 1914–15.

=== War years ===
During World War I, Livingston was appointed National superintendent of Women in Industry, and was in demand as a speaker to arouse the women to a realization of their duty in the war. She spent much time among the women workers in the munition factories and helped to keep up their enthusiasm and morale. She made a survey of women in industry in the U.S. and was able to bring about improvements in health and sanitary conditions in the factories at this time.

=== Post-war period ===
In 1919, as the National WCTU's superintendent of the Suffrage department, Livingston conducted a symposium of suffrage. with an introductory statement as to the present status of suffrage before introducing the WCTU presidents of the states that had won suffrage campaigns since the last National WCTU convention. In the same year, the National WCTU's department of Temperance and Labor was changed to Women in Industry, and placed under a committee of three, consisting of Livingston, Culla Johnson Vayhinger, and Lenna Lowe Yost.

In 1920, Livingston was a delegate to the World's WCTU Convention in London, and at that time, made a survey of women in industry in the British Isles and the Continental countries. In the same year, when the complete enfranchisement of women in the U.S. occurred, the National WCTU's Suffrage department was then merged into that of Christian Citizenship, with Livingston as the leader. Through this special work in the National WCTU, she wielded a far-reaching influence. With a finely organized staff of State, county, and local workers, Livingston formed study-classes in every State. She prepared a textbook on Christian Citizenship, Studies in Government (1921) that was later used by thousands of White Ribboners, and was popular with the Young People's Branch.

By 1922, Livingston was a resident of Newton Highlands, Massachusetts. In that year, she became Superintendent of the Department of Citizenship for the World's WCTU. Livingston's notability as a maker of sentiment for Prohibition brought invitations from other countries. When her native Scotland engaged in a no-license campaign, she went there on invitation to tell the story of "Prohibition in America". In the same year, in response to an urgent appeal from the WCTU of South Africa, she made a three-month tour of that country, speaking in universities and preaching in many of the large churches of Cape Town, Johannesburg, and Stellenbosch. In Durban, 1,100 Zulu men came to hear her speak. She received ovations from officials, educators and temperance workers. As one journalist said, "Mrs. Livingston told the truth and pricked the bubble of the evils from prohibition very effectively." Her strong, sane, thought-compelling messages gave a remarkable impetus to the anti-alcohol movement in South Africa.

Although the South Africa trip was undertaken primarily in the interest of the WCTU, Livingston did effective service in representing the WLAA in various conferences that were held, and in making surveys of conditions in South Africa, which were helpful to the Executive Department of the WLAA in the U.S. Livingston also worked on behalf of the WLAA in other countries, such as Scotland and England. Wherever she went, on her missions for the WCTU, she also became a representative of the WLAA in counsel and cooperation.

She was in California in February 1923 in her capacity as National WCTU and World WCTU's Director of Citizenship, lecturing before a dozen citizenship educational conferences in as many cities. In the same year, she was made Director of Suffrage for the World's WCTU.

Livingston was a member of the executive committee of the WLAA and was a delegate to various International Congresses of the League. In addition, for many years, she was closely associated with the Federation of Women's Clubs and League of Women Voters, often speaking for these organizations.

In addition to Livingston's Studies in Government, she wrote short treatises on a number of subjects, including: "Politics and Public Health", "Politics and Public Education", "Politics and Public Charities", and a "Brief Course in Civics for Busy Women".

== Personal life ==
The Livingston's had one child, a son, David (b. 1907).

In religion, she was a Baptist.

After suffering a nervous collapse in the spring of 1923, Livingston was brought to her summer home in Osterville, Massachusetts, where she grew steadily weaker, and died August 5, 1923.

== Selected works ==
=== Textbooks ===
- Studies in Government (1921; 2nd edition, 1934)

=== Treatises ===
- "Politics and Public Health"
- "Politics and Public Education"
- "Politics and Public Charities"
- "Brief Course in Civics for Busy Women"

=== Articles ===
- "Why Maine Women Need the Suffrage"
