= SS Elwood Mead =

World War II Liberty ship of the United States

History

United States
- Name: Elwood Mead
- Namesake: Elwood Mead
- Owner: War Shipping Administration
- Operator: Interocean Steamship Company
- Builder: Oregon Shipbuilding Corporation, Portland, Oregon
- Yard number: 2579
- Laid down: 18 December 1943
- Launched: 5 January 1944
- Sponsored by: Mrs. Elwood Mead
- Christened: 5 January 1944
- Completed: 15 January 1944
- Out of service: November 1968
- Renamed: SS Ioannis P. Goulandris, Goulandris Bros, Piraeus- Greek flag – 1947
- Fate: Scrapped Itozaki, Japan – 1968.

General characteristics
- Class & type: Type EC2-S-C1 Liberty ship
- Propulsion: Single screw

The SS Elwood Mead was a Liberty ship built for service during World War II.

== Namesake ==
The ship was named for Elwood Mead, a professor, politician and engineer, known for heading the United States Bureau of Reclamation (USBR) from 1924 until his death in 1936. During his tenure, he oversaw some of the most complex projects the Bureau of Reclamation has undertaken. These included the Hoover, Grand Coulee and Owyhee dams. Lake Mead is named in his honor.

== Construction ==
The vessel was built by the Oregon Shipbuilding Corporation, Portland, Oregon. It was laid down on 18 December 1943, and launched on 5 January 1944.

== Sponsor ==
The sponsor of the ship was Mrs. Elwood Mead. Her flower girl was her granddaughter, Becky Kaiser, 7, daughter of Mr. and Mrs. Edgar T. Kaiser. Mrs. Frank A. Banks, Grand Coulee, Washington, was a matron of honor at the Oregon Shipbuilding Corporation's launching.

== Service ==
She was operated by the operator Interocean Steamship Company of San Francisco. During the 1944 battle for the Philippines, "The Elwood Mead reported 83 general alarms in the 30-day period following her arrival at Leyte on November 19, but reported no other action."

== Post-war ==
In 1947, SS Elwood Mead was sold to Goulandris Bros, Piraeus, Greece, as part of the vast sale of shipping which constituted much of the Greek-flagged fleet in the post-war years. It was renamed SS Ioannis P. Goulandris, taking the name of an 1897 freighter (operating under the name since 1910) that was lost 12 March 1942 after a collision.

== Fate ==
Retired from service in November 1968, she was scrapped that year at Itozaki, Japan.
