= Switzerland County, Indiana =

County in Indiana, United States

- County
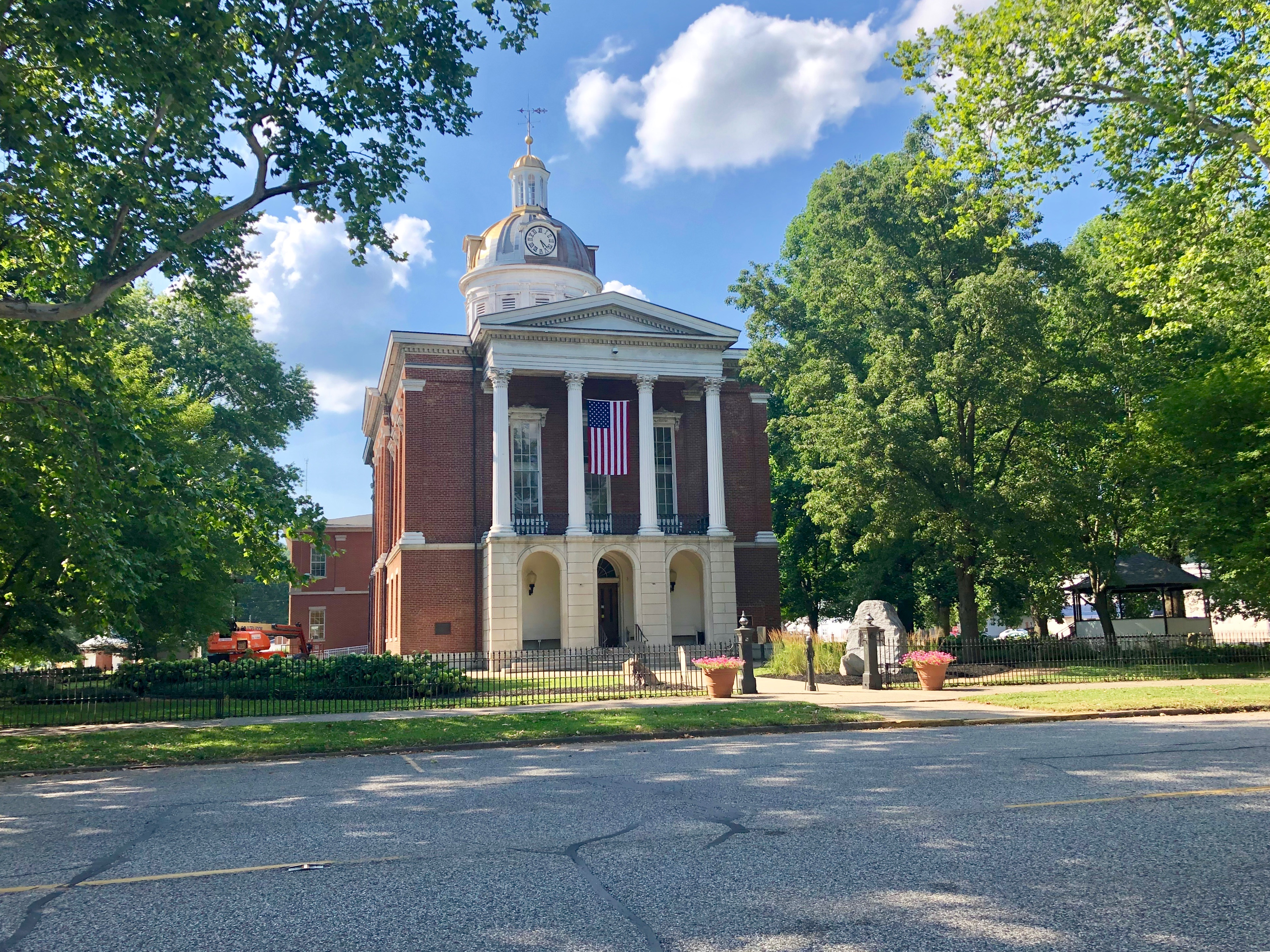
- Switzerland County Courthouse in Vevay

- Location within the U.S. state of Indiana
- Coordinates: 38°49′N 85°02′W
- Country: United States
- State: Indiana
- Founded: 1814
- Named for: Switzerland
- Seat: Vevay
- Largest town: Vevay

Area
  - Total: 223.44 sq mi (578.7 km^{2})
  - Land: 220.63 sq mi (571.4 km^{2})
  - Water: 2.81 sq mi (7.3 km^{2}) 1.26%

Population (2020)
  - Total: 9,737
  - Estimate (2025): 10,037 ▲
  - Density: 45.5/sq mi (17.6/km^{2})
- Time zone: UTC−5 (Eastern)
  - Summer (DST): UTC−4 (EDT)
- Congressional district: 9th
- Website: www.in.gov/counties/switzerland/
- Indiana county number 78

Switzerland County is a county in the southeast corner of the U.S. state of Indiana. As of the 2020 United States census, the population was 9,737. The county seat is Vevay, one of two incorporated towns in the county, the other being Patriot, IN, which is one of the smallest incorporated towns in the state.

== History ==
In 1787, the fledgling United States defined the Northwest Territory, which included the area of present-day Indiana. In 1800, Congress separated Ohio from the Northwest Territory, designating the rest of the land as the Indiana Territory. President Thomas Jefferson chose William Henry Harrison as the territory's first governor, and Vincennes was established as the territorial capital. After the Michigan Territory was separated and the Illinois Territory was formed, Indiana was reduced to its current size and geography. By December 1816 the Indiana Territory was admitted to the Union as a state.

Starting in 1794, Native American titles to Indiana lands were extinguished by usurpation, purchase, or war and treaty. The United States acquired land from the Native Americans in the 1809 treaty of Fort Wayne, and by the treaty of St. Mary's in 1818, the SE portion of Indiana Territory was acquired for settlement.

The area included in present-day Switzerland County was first placed in Knox County, formed in 1790. Parts of that extremely large county were partitioned off in 1803 to form Dearborn County and in 1810 to form Jefferson County. Settlers had been pouring into the extreme SE part of the Indiana Territory starting in 1795, and by 1814 there was sufficient population to form a local governing body. Accordingly, the state legislature authorized Switzerland County effective October 1, 1814, partitioning portions of Dearborn and Jefferson counties to make the creation. Four fledgling settlements were considered as the seat of government (Vevay, Little York [present-day Florence], Troy [present-day Patriot], and Center Square). Center Square was nearest the geographic center and was the presumed site, but Vevay carried the day.

Several early settlers were originally from Switzerland. The first was probably Heathcoat Pickett, in 1795. He was followed by John James Dufour (1796), and the Dickason, Cotton, and Rayl families in 1798. Pickett also made the area's first flatboats; he floated them (loaded with goods for sale) to New Orleans and sold the entire package, then walked back to Switzerland County. He made 20 such trips. Early county residents noted the passage of the first steamboat on the Ohio River in 1811; this form of transport quickly transformed the river into a conduit for commerce and travel. Although Indiana was criss-crossed with railroad tracks during the nineteenth century, none was laid to Switzerland County. This hindered its growth after the decline of steamboat travel.

Industrial wine grape production in Switzerland County earned the area the title "The Rhineland of America".

== Geography ==
Switzerland County lies at the SE tip of Indiana, with its southeastern border defined by the Ohio River; the state of Kentucky abuts on the opposite shore. Its rolling hills were originally completely wooded. Its more flat areas have been cleared for agricultural or urban use, but its many drainages are still wooded. Its highest elevation (981 feet/299 meters ASL) is a hill in its NW quadrant, 0.7 miles (1.1 km) west of Avonburg.

According to the 2010 census, the county has a total area of 223.44 square miles (578.7 km^{2}), of which 220.63 square miles (571.4 km^{2}) (or 98.74%) is land and 2.81 square miles (7.3 km^{2}) (or 1.26%) is water.

=== Adjacent counties ===
- Ohio County - north
- Boone County, Kentucky - northeast
- Gallatin County, Kentucky - east
- Carroll County, Kentucky - south
- Jefferson County - west
- Ripley County - northwest

=== Incorporated towns ===
- Patriot
- Vevay (county seat)

=== Unincorporated towns ===
- Aaron
- Allensville
- Avonburg
- Bennington
- Braytown
- Center Square
- East Enterprise (census-designated place)
- Fairview
- Florence (census-designated place)
- Gurley Corner
- Jacksonville
- Lamb
- Markland
- Moorefield
- Mount Sterling
- Pleasant
- Quercus Grove
- Searcy Crossroads

=== Townships ===
- Cotton
- Craig
- Jefferson
- Pleasant
- Posey
- York

=== Highways ===
- Indiana State Road 56
- Indiana State Road 101
- Indiana State Road 129
- Indiana State Road 156
- Indiana State Road 250

== Climate and weather ==
Vevay, Indiana

Climate chart (precipitation, max. and min. temperature)
J	F	M	A	M	J	J	A	S	O	N	D
3.2 40 23	3 46 26	4.1 56 35	4.2 67 43	4.7 77 53	4.6 85 62	3.9 88 67	4 86 65	3.1 80 58	3.1 68 46	3.7 55 37	3.7 44 28
- █ Average max. and min. temperatures in °F
- █ Precipitation totals in inches
- Source: The Weather Channel
Metric conversion
J	F	M	A	M	J	J	A	S	O	N	D
81 4 −5	76 8 −3	103 13 2	107 19 6	120 25 12	116 29 17	98 31 19	102 30 18	79 27 14	78 20 8	93 13 3	94 7 −2
- █ Average max. and min. temperatures in °C
- █ Precipitation totals in mm

In recent years, average temperatures in Vevay have ranged from a low of 23 °F (−5 °C) in January to a high of 88 °F (31 °C) in July, although a record low of −24 °F (−31 °C) was recorded in January 1977 and a record high of 106 °F (41 °C) was recorded in July 1999. Average monthly precipitation ranged from 3.00 inches (76 mm) in February to 4.72 inches (120 mm) in May.

== Demographics ==
Historical population
Census	Pop.	Note	%±
1820	3,934		—
1830	7,028		78.6%
1840	9,920		41.1%
1850	12,932		30.4%
1860	12,698		−1.8%
1870	12,134		−4.4%
1880	13,336		9.9%
1890	12,514		−6.2%
1900	11,840		−5.4%
1910	9,914		−16.3%
1920	9,311		−6.1%
1930	8,432		−9.4%
1940	8,167		−3.1%
1950	7,599		−7.0%
1960	7,092		−6.7%
1970	6,306		−11.1%
1980	7,153		13.4%
1990	7,738		8.2%
2000	9,065		17.1%
2010	10,613		17.1%
2020	9,737		−8.3%
2025 (est.)	10,037	▲	3.1%

=== Racial and ethnic composition ===
Switzerland County, Indiana – Racial and ethnic composition Note: the US Census treats Hispanic/Latino as an ethnic category. This table excludes Latinos from the racial categories and assigns them to a separate category. Hispanics/Latinos may be of any race.
Race / Ethnicity (NH = Non-Hispanic)	Pop 1980	Pop 1990	Pop 2000	Pop 2010	Pop 2020	% 1980	% 1990	% 2000	% 2010	% 2020
White alone (NH)	7,056	7,675	8,908	10,318	9,262	98.64%	99.19%	98.27%	97.22%	95.12%
Black or African American alone (NH)	14	15	21	31	14	0.20%	0.19%	0.23%	0.29%	0.14%
Native American or Alaska Native alone (NH)	10	16	11	16	26	0.14%	0.21%	0.12%	0.15%	0.27%
Asian alone (NH)	12	10	7	18	20	0.17%	0.13%	0.08%	0.17%	0.21%
Native Hawaiian or Pacific Islander alone (NH)	x	x	1	2	0	x	x	0.01%	0.02%	0.00%
Other race alone (NH)	2	0	4	12	11	0.03%	0.00%	0.04%	0.11%	0.11%
Mixed race or Multiracial (NH)	x	x	35	69	290	x	x	0.39%	0.65%	2.98%
Hispanic or Latino (any race)	59	22	78	147	114	0.82%	0.28%	0.86%	1.39%	1.17%
Total	7,153	7,738	9,065	10,613	9,737	100.00%	100.00%	100.00%	100.00%	100.00%

=== 2020 census ===
As of the 2020 census, the county had a population of 9,737. The median age was 40.9 years. 24.5% of residents were under the age of 18 and 17.8% of residents were 65 years of age or older. For every 100 females there were 104.3 males, and for every 100 females age 18 and over there were 102.5 males age 18 and over.

The racial makeup of the county was 95.5% White, 0.2% Black or African American, 0.3% American Indian and Alaska Native, 0.2% Asian, <0.1% Native Hawaiian and Pacific Islander, 0.4% from some other race, and 3.4% from two or more races. Hispanic or Latino residents of any race comprised 1.2% of the population.

<0.1% of residents lived in urban areas, while 100.0% lived in rural areas.

There were 3,788 households in the county, of which 31.9% had children under the age of 18 living in them. Of all households, 50.5% were married-couple households, 19.4% were households with a male householder and no spouse or partner present, and 20.2% were households with a female householder and no spouse or partner present. About 27.0% of all households were made up of individuals and 13.1% had someone living alone who was 65 years of age or older.

There were 4,290 housing units, of which 11.7% were vacant. Among occupied housing units, 74.7% were owner-occupied and 25.3% were renter-occupied. The homeowner vacancy rate was 1.7% and the rental vacancy rate was 7.2%.

=== 2010 census ===
As of the 2010 United States census, there were 10,613 people, 4,034 households, and 2,847 families in the county. The population density was 48.1 inhabitants per square mile (18.6/km^{2}). There were 4,969 housing units at an average density of 22.5 per square mile (8.7/km^{2}). The racial makeup of the county was 97.8% white, 0.3% black or African American, 0.2% Asian, 0.2% American Indian, 0.7% from other races, and 0.8% from two or more races. Those of Hispanic or Latino origin made up 1.4% of the population. In terms of ancestry, 25.4% were German, 16.1% were American, 13.2% were Irish, and 10.1% were English.

Of the 4,034 households, 33.5% had children under the age of 18 living with them, 54.2% were married couples living together, 10.0% had a female householder with no husband present, 29.4% were non-families, and 24.3% of all households were made up of individuals. The average household size was 2.60 and the average family size was 3.07. The median age was 39.1 years.

The median income for a household in the county was $47,697 and the median income for a family was $51,769. Males had a median income of $39,167 versus $30,814 for females. The per capita income for the county was $21,214. About 11.0% of families and 14.4% of the population were below the poverty line, including 19.2% of those under age 18 and 7.5% of those age 65 or over.

== Government ==
The county government is a constitutional body, and is granted specific powers by the Constitution of Indiana, and by the Indiana Code.

County Council: The legislative branch of the county government; controls spending and revenue collection in the county. Representatives are elected to four-year terms from county districts. They set salaries, the annual budget, and special spending. The council has limited authority to impose local taxes, in the form of an income and property tax that is subject to state level approval, excise taxes, and service taxes.

Board of Commissioners: The executive body of the county; commissioners are elected county-wide to staggered four-year terms. One commissioner serves as president. The commissioners execute acts legislated by the council, collect revenue, and manage the county government.

Court: The county maintains a circuit court which was established January 1, 2009. The first Judge of the Switzerland Circuit Court is W. Gregory Coy. The Judge is elected to a term of six years. The Court is a general jurisdiction court, meaning it handles all types of cases. The Judge must be a licensed attorney. All decisions of the Court are appealable to the Indiana Court of Appeals or the Indiana Supreme Court.

County Officials: The county has other elected offices, including sheriff, coroner, auditor, treasurer, recorder, surveyor, and circuit court clerk. They are elected to four-year terms. Members elected to county government positions are required to declare party affiliations and to be residents of the county.

Switzerland County is part of Indiana's 9th congressional district.

United States presidential election results for Switzerland County, Indiana
Year	Republican		Democratic		Third party(ies)	
Year	No.	%	No.	%	No.	%
1888	1,560	47.87%	1,637	50.23%	62	1.90%
1892	1,497	47.42%	1,589	50.33%	71	2.25%
1896	1,637	48.27%	1,742	51.37%	12	0.35%
1900	1,631	48.50%	1,713	50.94%	19	0.56%
1904	1,461	47.48%	1,554	50.50%	62	2.01%
1908	1,444	47.27%	1,537	50.31%	74	2.42%
1912	882	32.81%	1,342	49.93%	464	17.26%
1916	1,214	44.05%	1,446	52.47%	96	3.48%
1920	2,525	50.12%	2,412	47.88%	101	2.00%
1924	2,346	48.29%	2,414	49.69%	98	2.02%
1928	2,617	58.62%	1,805	40.43%	42	0.94%
1932	1,953	38.79%	2,981	59.21%	101	2.01%
1936	2,212	43.66%	2,840	56.06%	14	0.28%
1940	2,285	46.01%	2,659	53.54%	22	0.44%
1944	2,019	47.32%	2,191	51.35%	57	1.34%
1948	1,839	43.30%	2,375	55.92%	33	0.78%
1952	2,070	48.42%	2,167	50.69%	38	0.89%
1956	2,074	49.28%	2,114	50.23%	21	0.50%
1960	1,929	49.40%	1,955	50.06%	21	0.54%
1964	1,390	38.19%	2,231	61.29%	19	0.52%
1968	1,515	44.07%	1,466	42.64%	457	13.29%
1972	1,872	53.53%	1,612	46.10%	13	0.37%
1976	1,329	38.07%	2,150	61.59%	12	0.34%
1980	1,584	47.14%	1,704	50.71%	72	2.14%
1984	1,857	55.48%	1,484	44.34%	6	0.18%
1988	1,572	51.39%	1,479	48.35%	8	0.26%
1992	1,211	35.74%	1,535	45.31%	642	18.95%
1996	1,266	39.72%	1,496	46.94%	425	13.34%
2000	1,831	56.53%	1,336	41.25%	72	2.22%
2004	2,161	58.87%	1,479	40.29%	31	0.84%
2008	1,940	53.30%	1,638	45.00%	62	1.70%
2012	1,872	55.11%	1,437	42.30%	88	2.59%
2016	2,558	68.97%	930	25.07%	221	5.96%
2020	3,133	75.33%	964	23.18%	62	1.49%
2024	3,319	77.95%	873	20.50%	66	1.55%

== See also ==
- Switzerland County Senior High School
- National Register of Historic Places listings in Switzerland County, Indiana
