= Fairview, Switzerland County, Indiana =

Fairview
- Unincorporated community
- Location within Indiana Location within the United States
- Coordinates: 38°52′24″N 85°04′51″W
- Country: United States
- State: Indiana
- County: Switzerland
- Township: Cotton
- Elevation: 889 ft (271 m)
- Time zone: UTC-5 (Eastern (EST))
  - Summer (DST): UTC-4 (EDT)
- ZIP code: 47011
- Area code: 812
- GNIS feature ID: 449654

Fairview is an unincorporated community in Cotton Township, Switzerland County, in the U.S. state of Indiana.

== History ==
An old variant name of the community was called Sugar Branch. A post office was established under this name in 1835, was renamed to Fairview in 1911, and operated until it was discontinued in 1935.
