= Henry James Carr =

American librarian

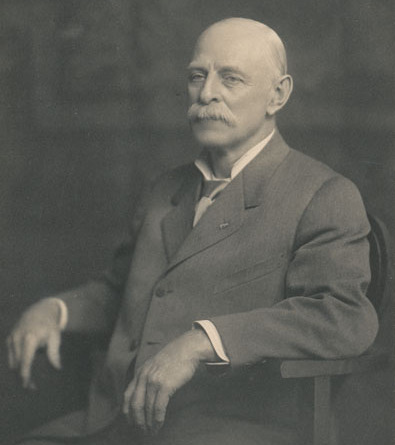
- Henry James Carr in November 1913

President of the American Library Association
- In office 1900–1901
- Preceded by: Reuben Gold Thwaites
- Succeeded by: John Shaw Billings

Personal details
- Born: August 16, 1849 Pembroke, New Hampshire, US
- Died: May 21, 1929 (aged 79) Scranton, Pennsylvania, US
- Education: University of Michigan
- Occupation: Librarian

Henry James Carr (August 16, 1849 – May 21, 1929) was an American librarian.

Carr was raised in New Hampshire and Grand Rapids, Michigan. He worked as an accountant and cashier in railway offices from 1867 to 1886. During that time, he studied law at the University of Michigan, gaining admission to the bar in 1879, but he never practiced law. In 1886, Carr was named librarian for the Grand Rapids Public Library, where he worked until 1890 when he was recruited to create a new public library for the residents of Saint Joseph, Missouri. In 1891 he moved to Scranton, Pennsylvania, to assist them in establishing their public library.

Carr served as the president of the American Library Association from 1900 to 1901. He also served as the association's secretary from 1898 to 1900 and its treasurer from 1886 to 1893.

Carr was married to Edith Wallbridge, first State Librarian of Illinois, who was also the unofficial statistician and antiquarian of the American Library Association. The American Library Association Archives has characterized them as "ALA’s Golden Couple."

Carr served as Librarian in Scranton until his death in 1929.

== See also ==
- Albright Memorial Building

Non-profit organization positions
Preceded by Reuben Gold Thwaites	President of the American Library Association; 1900–1901	Succeeded by John Shaw Billings
