= Reuben Gold Thwaites =

American librarian and author (1853-1913)

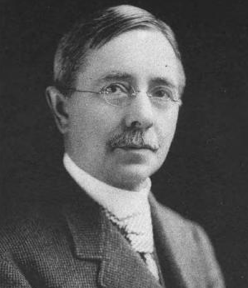

President of the American Library Association
- In office 1899–1900
- Preceded by: William Coolidge Lane
- Succeeded by: Henry James Carr

Personal details
- Born: May 15, 1853 Dorchester, Massachusetts, U.S.
- Died: October 22, 1913 (aged 60) Madison, Wisconsin, U.S.
- Parents: William George Thwaites; Sarah Bibbs
- Occupation: Journalist, librarian, historian

Reuben Gold Thwaites (/θweɪts/ May 15, 1853 – October 22, 1913) was an American librarian and historical writer.

== Biography ==
Thwaites was born in 1853 in Dorchester, Massachusetts. His parents were William George and Sarah Bibbs Thwaites, who had moved to Dorchester in 1850 from Yorkshire, England. The family moved to Omro, Wisconsin, in 1866, where Reuben worked on the farm, studied college-level coursework and reported for the Oshkosh Times. In 1874–1875 he studied English literature, economic history and international law at Yale University. Thwaites studied at Yale as a special student, and beyond that never formally studied at the collegiate level, although later in his life he was awarded an LLD from the University of Wisconsin.

From 1876 to 1886, Thwaites was managing editor of the Wisconsin State Journal, at Madison. In 1885 he became assistant corresponding secretary of the State Historical Society of Wisconsin, and when Lyman Draper retired as secretary 1887, Thwaites was appointed to succeed him. While leading the historical society he edited volumes XI-XIX of the Wisconsin Historical Collections, The Jesuit Relations, Early Western Travels, 1748–1846, and Original Journals of Lewis and Clark. He also authored a number of papers and monographs including a biography of Daniel Boone, a biography of Jacques Marquette, and a history of colonial North America.

Thwaites is credited with raising the scholarship surrounding the Lewis and Clark Expedition to a new level. Previous to the editions that were published under his leadership, general knowledge as well as serious scholarship were for the most part hampered by legend. Thwaites discovered and uncovered various additional original sources, including the journal of Charles Floyd, the only member of the Corps of Discovery to die on the expedition. By including these disparate sources and tying them together in a cohesive set of volumes, the nature and importance of the expedition became more generally recognized.

In 1892 Thwaites was elected a member of the American Antiquarian Society, in 1899 he was president of the American Library Association, and in 1910 he was named president of the Mississippi Valley Historical Association.

Thwaites was well known for not being a mere academic, but rather as a historian who attempted to understand history by experiencing those aspects that he could, and bringing those experiences to life. In 1888 he took canoe trips on the Wisconsin, Fox and Rock rivers. In 1892 he undertook a bicycle tour of England, and in 1894 rowed the length of the Ohio River.

Thwaites' approach and work has been questioned, to some degree by his contemporaries but more so in modern times, especially by historian Donald Jackson, who called for a more thorough work of Lewis & Clark's manuscripts. His summaries include phraseology such as "[Europeans] left the most luxurious country in Europe to seek shelter in the foul and unwelcome huts of one of the most wretched races of man." When editing the Jesuit Relations, he included background information that is generally credible and thorough with respect to events and Europe, but is far less thorough in regard to the disruptions from disease and other sources that the indigenous people themselves were facing. In other words, the criticism is that the original works were insensitive, and Thwaites failed to fully account for the prejudicial and inaccurate reporting in the Relations. However, Thwaites is also recognized as being the pioneer in an approach to using the Relations that is continuing to be enriched by modern scholarship, and so in a sense he started a process by which his very work could be corrected and improved as historians learn more about the periods in question.

Thwaites died in 1913 of heart failure after a short hospitalization. He was survived by his wife Jessie, whom he married in 1882, and son Fredrik (1883-1961), renowned glacial geologist and geomorphologist.

== Publications ==
Other publications not already cited in the references include:

- Thwaites, Reuben Gold (1903). How George Rogers Clark won the Northwest, and other essays in western history. Chicago: A.C. McClurg & Co.
- Thwaites, Reuben Gold (1904). A brief history of Rocky Mountain exploration. New York: D. Appleton & Company.
- Thwaites, Reuben Gold (1905). France in America, 1497–1763. New York: Harper & Brothers.
- Wisconsin (1909)
- School History of the United States (1912)
- Thwaites, Reuben Gold, ed. The Jesuit Relations and Allied Documents : Travels and explorations of the Jesuit missionaries in New France, 1610–1791, Cleveland: Burrows Bros. Co., 1896–1901.
- Withers, Alexander Scott, Chronicles of Border Warfare, or a History of the Settlement by the Whites, of North-Western Virginia, and of the Indian Wars and Massacres in that section of the State; with Reflections, Anecdotes, &c., Edited and annotated by Reuben Gold Thwaites, with several notes by Lyman Copeland Draper. (Cincinnati: The Robert Clarke Company, or Steward and Kidd Publishers, 1895). Reprinted in 1958 by McClain Publishing Company, Parsons, W.Va., ISBN 0-8063-4509-8.

Non-profit organization positions
Preceded by William Coolidge Lane	President of the American Library Association; 1899–1900	Succeeded by Henry James Carr
