= Donald Dean Jackson =

American journalist and historian (1919–1987)

- Born: June 10, 1919; Glenwood, Iowa, U.S.
- Died: December 9, 1987 (aged 68); Colorado Springs, Colorado, U.S.
- Resting place: Glenwood Cemetery, Glenwood, Mills County, Iowa, US
- Occupations: Journalist, historian, professor of history
- Spouse: Mary Catherine Mayberry Jackson
- Children: Robert and Mark Jackson

Signature
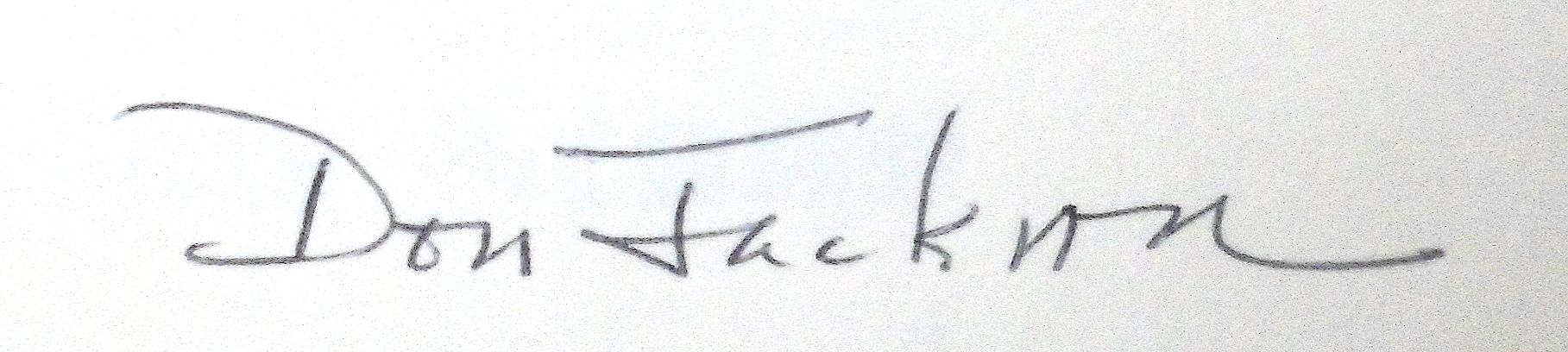

Donald Dean Jackson (June 10, 1919 – December 9, 1987) was an American journalist, historian, and professor of American history involving early America and the Civil War mostly. He was the founding editor of the University of Virginia's George Washington Papers project. Apart from his editing and publishing of those papers, Jackson was also noted for his consulting and editorship in the Lewis and Clark project, gathering and compiling related manuscripts into one comprehensive study. Jackson was also considered an expert historian of the American West and its exploration and authored many books and journals in that area of study.

== Life ==
=== Early life ===
Jackson was born on June 10, 1919, in Glenwood, Iowa. He earned a Bachelor of Science from Iowa State University in 1942, with a degree in technical journalism, after which he became a reporter for the Des Moines Register, and then a radio news editor for WOI in Ames, Iowa. In 1946 he earned his master's degree in English from the University of Iowa, after which he authored a work about Johann Amerbach, a Renaissance printer from Germany who lived in the 16th century.

=== Career ===
Jackson then became interested in American history, returning to school to receive a Master of Arts from the University of Iowa in 1946 and a Doctorate in Philosophy from the same school in 1948. Pursuing a career in the field, he soon established himself as noted historian of the American West and its discovery. During his career as a writer and historian, Jackson became a member of the American Historical Association, the Organization of American Historians, the Society for the History of Discoveries and the American Antiquarian Society. Jackson was the editor at the University of Illinois Press from 1948 to 1966. In 1968, Jackson entered the University of Virginia as a professor of history and became the editor of The Papers of George Washington. In 1976, the Virginia Bicentennial Commission published Jackson's George Washington and the War of Independence.

=== Later life ===
In 1978, Jackson retired and took up residence in Colorado Springs, Colorado, where he rebuilt a cabin and turned it into an upscale home, where he lived until his death on December 9, 1987. Jackson died of cancer in Colorado Springs at the age of 68 and was buried in Glenwood Cemetery, Glenwood, Mills County, Iowa. He had two sons, Robert Woods Jackson of Charlottesville, Virginia, and Mark Richard Jackson of San Francisco, California.

== Works ==
Jackson once defined his role as a historian as a "polisher of others' words and thoughts", and acted in this capacity as a long time editor while working at the University of Illinois Press, and that of the University of Virginia. Although Jackson wrote a number of his own works, he was largely committed to the editing process, guiding many scholarly works from the draft stages to finished works for publication. Among Jackson's most notable works are the six-volume Papers of George Washington (Note: Assisted by historian Dorothy Twohig) and George Washington and the War of Independence. He also did extensive research into the Lewis & Clark Expedition and authored several works on the subject. In 1985 Jackson published Voyages of the Steamboat Yellow Stone, a narrative about, "The Life and Times of an Early-American Steamboat as It Pioneered on the Upper Missouri River and Played a Major Role in the War for Texas Independence". A number of his works were published after his death in 1987.

=== Papers of George Washington project ===
The Papers of George Washington documentary editing project was founded at the University of Virginia in 1968 under Donald Jackson, who was its editor-in-chief.

William J. Van Schreeven, the Virginia state archivist, and Edgar J. Shannon, Jr., University of Virginia president, also played critical (sometimes overlooked) roles in the founding The Washington Papers project. In January 1967, Shannon put together a committee to explore the possibilities for such a project. William W. Abbot, then the James Madison Professor of History at University of Virginia, was chosen as chairman, while seven others were chosen from the university community to serve as members, including Dumas Malone, the renown Thomas Jefferson biographer. On October 18, 1966, after coordinating with the members, Shreeven proposed that a complete and comprehensive edition of the papers of George Washington be published. In the Spring of 1958, the committee's endorsement lead to a search, where they approached Donald Jackson to take the initiative and begin work assembling and organizing George Washington's papers for publication.

When originally asked to take on the editing job, Jackson hesitated as he felt he did not possess the proper background and familiarity with all the details of Washington's life. After the search committee explained they were not necessarily looking for a Washington scholar, but someone who had experience managing an editing office and dealing with volumes of manuscripts, he was finally persuaded to accept their offer. Jackson oversaw the extensive worldwide search for letters and documents from and to Washington, an effort which eventually procured some 140,000 items. Washington's diaries were subsequently published by the Virginia Bicentennial Commission in six volumes from 1976 to 1979. In 1983, the project published Washington's general correspondence in a multiple series.

=== Lewis and Clark project ===
Jackson held that few documents have endured as much as the journals of the Lewis and Clark Expedition. The expedition party, besides with Meriwether Lewis and William Clark, consisted of writers, naturalists, mapmakers, and artists; Jackson considered them "the writingest explorers of their time".

In 1967, Jackson formally declared a need for a more thorough journal covering the documents of Lewis and Clark relating to their expedition in 1804–1806, citing the incompleteness of the journals authored by Reuben Gold Thwaites in 1904–1905, among others. In his address to the Centennial Conference of the Missouri Historical Society in March of that year, Jackson brought attention to the situation, stating that using the myriad and different journals to assess the expedition's history proved to be very involved and time-consuming and that "some kind of standard edition" was badly needed. However, his call to undertake such an involved and lengthy effort was largely ignored by the academic and historical community for almost a decade.

The Center for Great Plains Studies researched the scope of undertaking such an involved project. Serving as a project consultant, Donald Jackson procured the cooperation of historical institutions that held Lewis and Clark's original materials and ascertained the financial support available. Jackson's efforts proved to be a major success. All the historical institutions in possession of Lewis and Clark materials agreed to share their manuscripts and journals with Jackson and the project. Moreover, the American Philosophical Society, the principal holder of Lewis and Clark's autograph manuscripts, agreed to co–sponsor the project. Jackson authored the first draft of the Lewis and Clark historical account and presented it to the National Endowment for the Humanities, which became the basis for the final proposal granted by the NEH in 1980.

=== Publications ===
- Johann Amerbach
- Letters of the Lewis and Clark Expedition: With Related Documents, 1783-1854, Two volumes, (1962)
- The Journals of Zebulon Montgomery Pike, with letters and related documents, (1966)
- George Washington and the War of Independence, Williamsburg: Virginia Independence Bicentennial Commission, (1976)
- Custer's Gold: The United States Cavalry Expedition of 1874, (1972)
- The Expeditions of John Charles Frémont: Supplementary Proceedings of the Court-Martial, four volumes in two parts
- Valley Men: A Speculative Account of the Arkansas Expedition of 1807, (1983
- Voyages of the Steamboat Yellow Stone, (1985)
- Among the Sleeping Giants: Occasional Pieces on Lewis and Clark, (1987)
- Great American Bridges and Damns, (1988)
- A Year at Monticello, 1795, (1989)
- Thomas Jefferson & the Stony Mountains: Exploring the West from Monticello, (1993)
- Building the Ultimate Dam: John S. Eastwood and the Control of Water in the West, (2005)

=== Journal articles ===
Jackson had written numerous journalistic articles on the exploration of the American West, with an emphasis on the Lewis and Clark Expedition and President Jefferson's involvement. Selected articles that reflect this forte are listed below. (Note: All works listed in this section cited by Jackson, 1989, unless otherwise noted. Various works listed here also have corroborating citations.)

- "Jefferson, Meriwether Lewis, and the Reduction of the United States Army", Proceedings of the American Philosophical Society, Vol. 124, No. 2 (April 29, 1980), pp. 91–96
- Zebulon M. Pike 'Tours' Mexico, American West, 1966, pp. 69–71, 89–93
- The Public Image of Lewis and Clark", Pacific Northwest Quarterly, Jan. 1966, Vol. 57, No. 1, pp. 1–7
- Thomas Jefferson and the Pacific Northwest", 1974
- How Lost Was Zebulon Pike?" American Heritage, February 1965, Vol. 16, No. 2, pp. 10–15
- George Washington's Beautiful Nelly", American Heritage, February 1977, Vol. 28, No. 2
- Jefferson, Meriwether Lewis, and the Reduction of the United States Army

== See also ==
- Bibliography of George Washington
- Timeline of the American Old West
- Reuben Gold Thwaites, a historian who also worked with Lewis and Clark's records.
