= Culla Johnson Vayhinger =

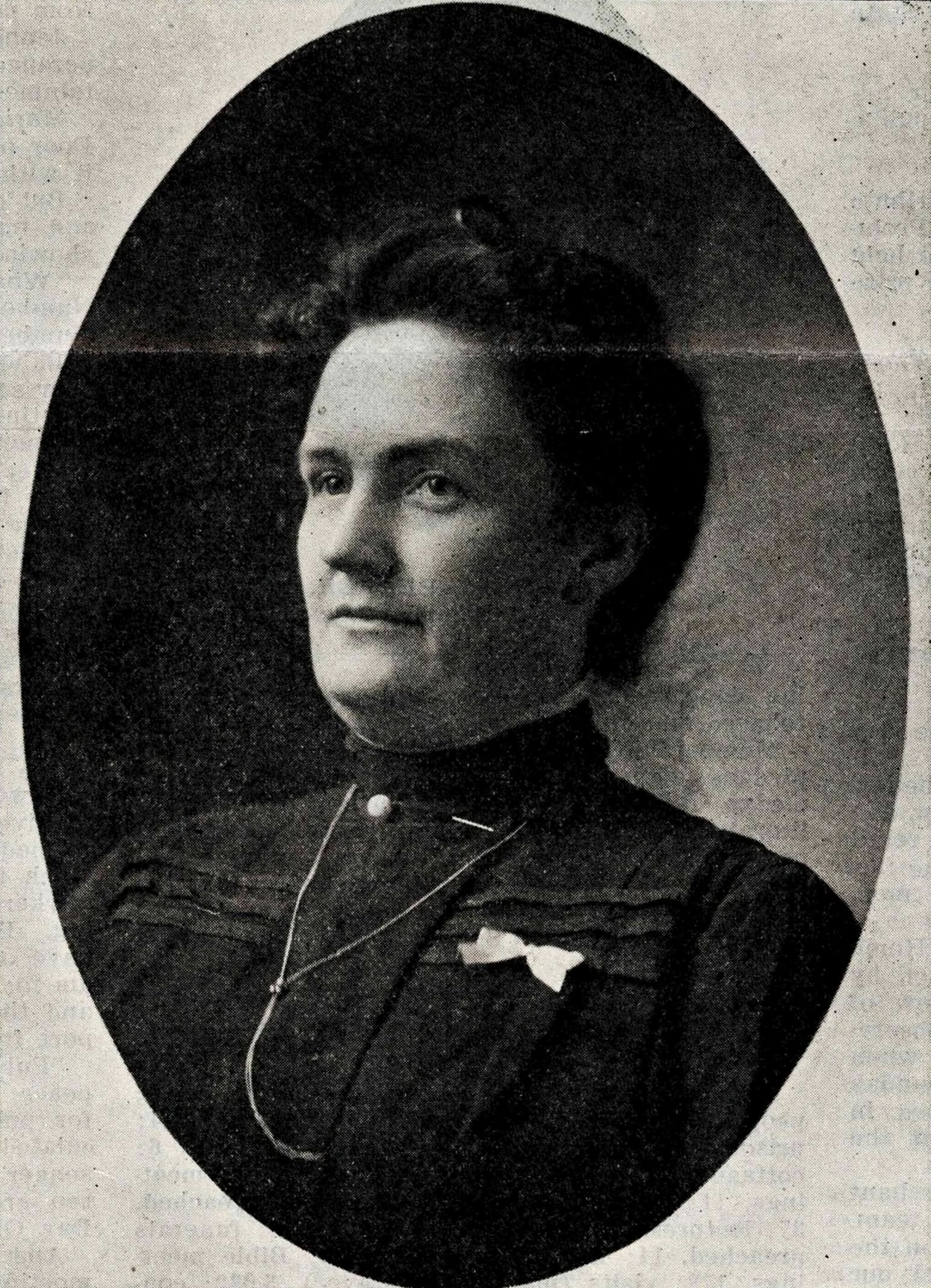
- Vayhinger in a 1907 publication.
- Born: Flora Columbia Johnson; September 25, 1867; Bennington, Indiana, U.S.
- Died: August 15, 1924 (aged 56); Upland, Indiana
- Education: Moore's Hill College (now University of Evansville)
- Occupations: temperance reformer; educator; religious and political leader
- Organization: Woman's Christian Temperance Union (WCTU)
- Known for: President of the Indiana WCTU
- Spouse: Monroe Vayhinger (m. 1889)
- Children: 3

Culla Johnson Vayhinger (September 25, 1867 – August 15, 1924) was an American temperance reformer, educator, religious and political leader in Indiana. She served as President of the Woman's Christian Temperance Union (WCTU) of Indiana.

== Early life and education ==
Flora Columbia Johnson (nickname, "Culla") was born in Bennington, Indiana, September 25, 1867. Her parents were Charles and Matilda (Wainscott) Johnson.

She was educated at Moore's Hill College (now University of Evansville) (BS, 1888), and in 1914, she received from her alma mater the degree of Master of Arts pro honore.

== Career ==
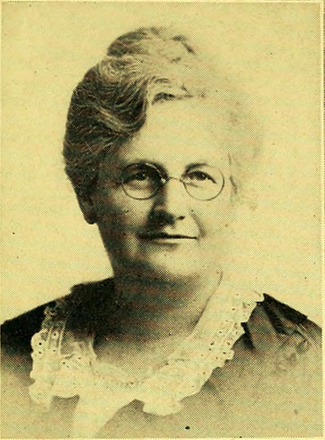
Vayhinger in 1924

In 1889, she was part of the management team of the Moore's Hill public schools. In February of the same year, after the Young People's Methodist Alliance was organized, Vayhinger became one of its directors.

Vayhinger was active throughout her life in temperance reform. At the age of seventeen, she became affiliated with the WCTU. After serving in various official positions in the local, county, and State Unions, in 1903 she was made president of the Indiana WCTU, and directed that organization for seventeen years. During this period, she was also active in platform work, and a leader in the Legislative Council of Indiana Women.

She was a member of the middle division of the Flying Squadron which toured the country in the interest of Prohibition in 1914. She was one of the two women on the squadron, the other being Ella A. Boole.

In 1919, the National WCTU's department of Temperance and Labor was changed to Women in Industry, and placed under a committee of three, consisting of Vayhinger, Deborah Knox Livingston, and Lenna Lowe Yost.

In 1920, she became director of Americanization work for the National WCTU, which position she continued to hold to the time of her death. In the same year, Vayhinger was the Prohibition Party candidate for United States Senator from Indiana.

Vayhinger served as president of the Evansville College Alumni Association.

== Personal life ==
In 1889, in Moores Hill, Indiana, she married Prof. Rev. Monroe Vayhinger, a Methodist minister who served as president of Taylor University, in Upland, Indiana, during the period of 1908–21. They had three children: Harold Dale, Paul Johnson, Lois Miriam.

In religion, she was Methodist.

Vayhinger favored woman suffrage.

Culla Johnson Vayhinger died in Upland, Indiana, on August 15, 1924. Interment was in Crown Hill Cemetery.
