= Allensville, Indiana =

- Unincorporated community
- Location within Indiana Location within the United States
- Coordinates: 38°52′23″N 85°01′13″W
- Country: United States
- State: Indiana
- County: Switzerland
- Township: Cotton
- Elevation: 873 ft (266 m)
- Time zone: UTC-5 (Eastern (EST))
  - Summer (DST): UTC-4 (EDT)
- ZIP code: 47043
- Area codes: 812, 930
- GNIS feature ID: 430098

Allensville is an unincorporated community in Cotton Township, Switzerland County, in the U.S. state of Indiana.

The community is located on Indiana State Road 250 just west of East Enterprise.

== History ==
A post office was established at Allensville in 1823, and remained in operation until it was discontinued in 1908.
