= Patriot, Indiana =

- Town
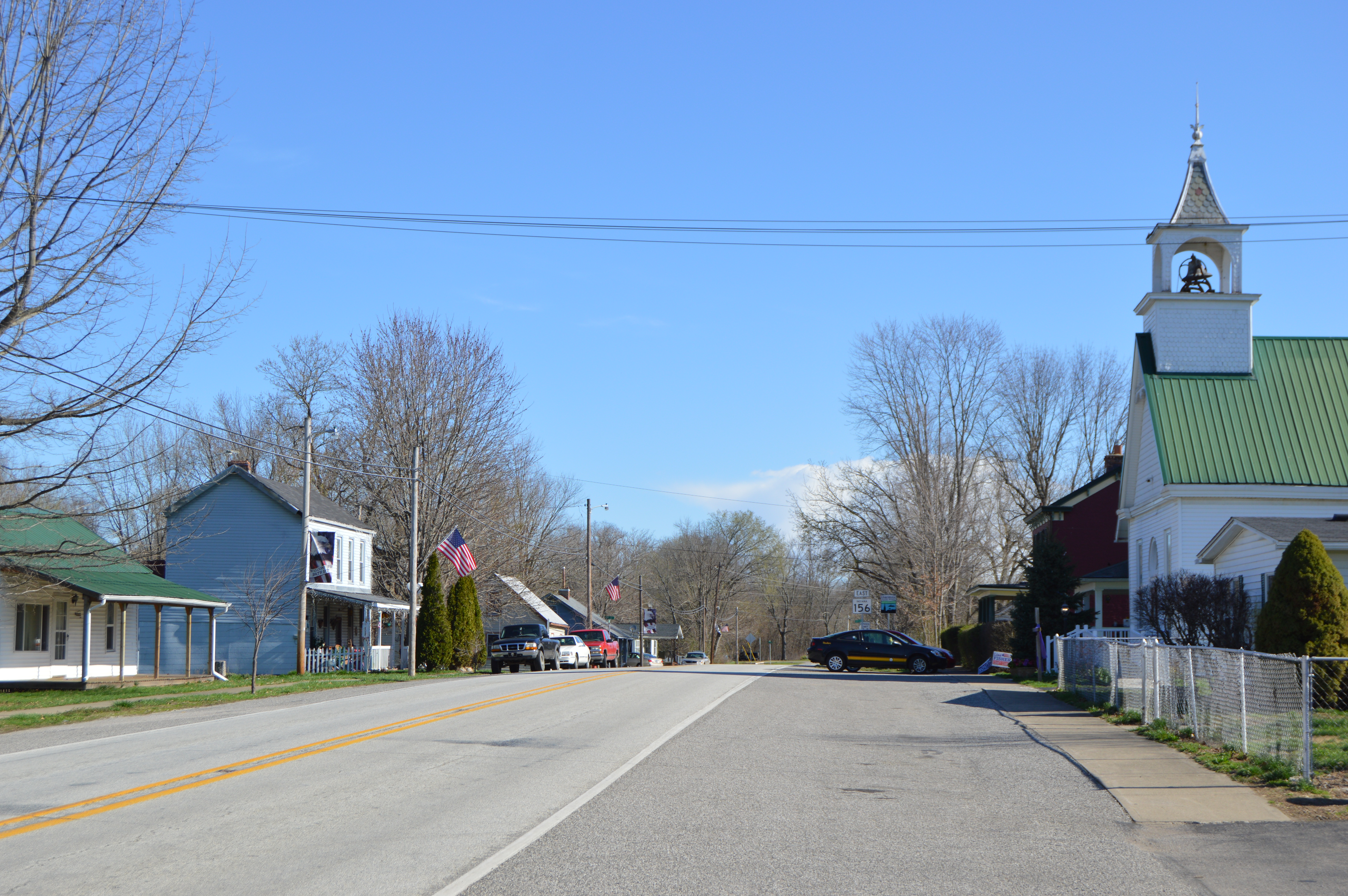
- Downtown Patriot

- Location of Patriot in Switzerland County, Indiana.
- Coordinates: 38°50′07″N 84°49′48″W
- Country: United States
- State: Indiana
- County: Switzerland
- Township: Posey

Area
  - Total: 0.32 sq mi (0.84 km^{2})
  - Land: 0.28 sq mi (0.73 km^{2})
  - Water: 0.039 sq mi (0.10 km^{2})
- Elevation: 463 ft (141 m)

Population (2020)
  - Total: 201
  - Density: 711.4/sq mi (274.67/km^{2})
- Time zone: UTC-5 (Eastern (EST))
  - Summer (DST): UTC-4 (EDT)
- ZIP code: 47038
- Area code: 812
- FIPS code: 18-58392
- GNIS feature ID: 2396851

Patriot is a town in Posey Township, Switzerland County, in the U.S. state of Indiana, along the Ohio River. As of the 2020 census, Patriot had a population of 201.

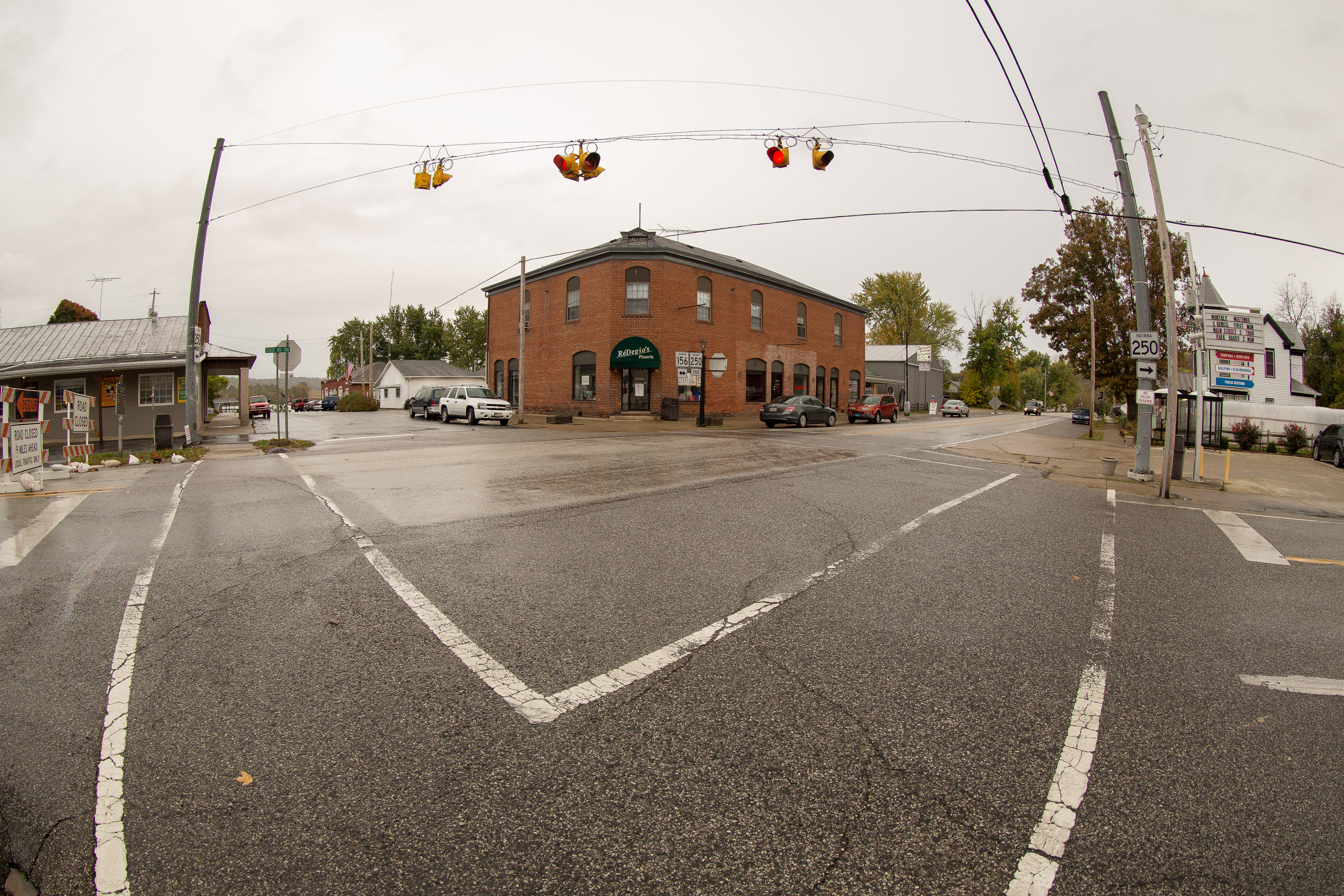
Photo from Small Town Indiana photo survey.

== Geography ==
Patriot is the easternmost settlement in Indiana.

According to the 2010 census, Patriot has a total area of 0.26 square miles (0.67 km^{2}), of which 0.22 square miles (0.57 km^{2}) (or 84.62%) is land and 0.04 square miles (0.10 km^{2}) (or 15.38%) is water.

== History ==
Patriot was originally called Troy, and under the latter name was platted in 1812. The Patriot post office has been in operation since 1827.

Patriot has suffered several calamities in its history. A 1924 fire destroyed a large portion of its downtown. The town was again devastated in the Ohio River flood of 1937.

== Demographics ==
Historical population
Census	Pop.	Note	%±
1880	467		—
1890	434		−7.1%
1900	408		−6.0%
1910	340		−16.7%
1920	289		−15.0%
1930	288		−0.3%
1940	257		−10.8%
1950	315		22.6%
1960	277		−12.1%
1970	216		−22.0%
1980	265		22.7%
1990	190		−28.3%
2000	202		6.3%
2010	209		3.5%
2020	201		−3.8%
U.S. Decennial Census

=== 2010 census ===
As of the census of 2010, there were 209 people, 76 households, and 59 families residing in the town. The population density was 950.0 inhabitants per square mile (366.8/km^{2}). There were 93 housing units at an average density of 422.7 per square mile (163.2/km^{2}). The racial makeup of the town was 98.1% White, 0.5% Native American, 0.5% Asian, 0.5% from other races, and 0.5% from two or more races. Hispanic or Latino of any race were 1.4% of the population.

There were 76 households, of which 27.6% had children under the age of 18 living with them, 57.9% were married couples living together, 11.8% had a female householder with no husband present, 7.9% had a male householder with no wife present, and 22.4% were non-families. 17.1% of all households were made up of individuals, and 2.6% had someone living alone who was 65 years of age or older. The average household size was 2.75 and the average family size was 2.97.

The median age in the town was 42.1 years. 23% of residents were under the age of 18; 5.1% were between the ages of 18 and 24; 26.3% were from 25 to 44; 34% were from 45 to 64; and 11.5% were 65 years of age or older. The gender makeup of the town was 54.1% male and 45.9% female.

=== 2000 census ===
As of the census of 2000, there were 202 people, 73 households, and 60 families residing in the town. The population density was 906.7 inhabitants per square mile (350.1/km^{2}). There were 108 housing units at an average density of 484.8 per square mile (187.2/km^{2}). The racial makeup of the town was 98.02% White, 0.50% African American, 0.50% Native American, and 0.99% from two or more races. Hispanic of any race were 0.99% of the population.

There were 73 households, out of which 38.4% had children under the age of 18 living with them, 63.0% were married couples living together, 13.7% had a female householder with no husband present, and 17.8% were non-families. 13.7% of all households were made up of individuals, and 2.7% had someone living alone who was 65 years of age or older. The average household size was 2.77 and the average family size was 3.00.

In the town, the population was spread out, with 27.2% under the age of 18, 8.9% from 18 to 24, 29.7% from 25 to 44, 26.2% from 45 to 64, and 7.9% who were 65 years of age or older. The median age was 36 years. For every 100 females, there were 114.9 males. For every 100 females age 18 and over, there were 113.0 males.

The median income for a household in the town was $37,500, and the median income for a family was $38,438. Males had a median income of $29,135 versus $26,071 for females. The per capita income for the town was $16,866. About 6.0% of families and 10.4% of the population were below the poverty line, including 17.6% of those under the age of eighteen and none of those 65 or over.

== Notable people ==
- M. Catherine Allen – Shaker; member of the Central Shaker Ministry and historian
- Lydia Moss Bradley – Philanthropist and founder of Bradley University
- Elwood Mead – head of the United States Bureau of Reclamation from 1924 to 1936
- Augusta Stevenson – author of children's literature

== See also ==
- List of cities and towns along the Ohio River
