= Moorefield, Indiana =

- Unincorporated community
- Location within Indiana Location within the United States
- Coordinates: 38°48′20″N 85°10′13″W
- Country: United States
- State: Indiana
- County: Switzerland
- Township: Pleasant
- Elevation: 906 ft (276 m)
- Time zone: UTC-5 (Eastern (EST))
  - Summer (DST): UTC-4 (EDT)
- ZIP code: 47043
- Area codes: 812, 930
- GNIS feature ID: 439407

Moorefield is an unincorporated community in Pleasant Township, Switzerland County, in the U.S. state of Indiana.

== History ==
Moorefield was platted in 1834. A post office was established at Moorefield in 1838, and remained in operation until it was discontinued in 1916.
