= Jacksonville, Indiana =

- Unincorporated community
- Location within Indiana Location within the United States
- Coordinates: 38°49′44″N 85°02′56″W
- Country: United States
- State: Indiana
- County: Switzerland
- Township: Jefferson
- Elevation: 866 ft (264 m)
- Time zone: UTC-5 (Eastern (EST))
  - Summer (DST): UTC-4 (EDT)
- ZIP code: 47842
- Area codes: 812, 930
- GNIS feature ID: 436905

Jacksonville is an unincorporated community in Jefferson Township, Switzerland County, in the U.S. state of Indiana.

== History ==
Jacksonville was platted in 1815. A post office was established at Jacksonville in 1841, and remained in operation until it was discontinued in 1867.
