= Center Square, Indiana =

- Unincorporated community
- Location within Indiana Location within the United States
- Coordinates: 38°50′11″N 85°01′53″W
- Country: United States
- State: Indiana
- County: Switzerland
- Township: Jefferson
- Elevation: 889 ft (271 m)
- Time zone: UTC-5 (Eastern (EST))
  - Summer (DST): UTC-4 (EDT)
- ZIP code: 47043
- Area codes: 812, 930
- FIPS code: 18-11764
- GNIS feature ID: 449635

Center Square is an unincorporated community in Jefferson Township, Switzerland County, in the U.S. state of Indiana.

== History ==
A post office was established at Center Square in 1867, and remained in operation until it was discontinued in 1907.
