= East Enterprise, Indiana =

- Census-designated place
- Location of East Enterprise in Switzerland County, Indiana.
- Coordinates: 38°52′22″N 84°59′22″W
- Country: United States
- State: Indiana
- County: Switzerland
- Township: Cotton

Area
  - Total: 0.52 sq mi (1.34 km^{2})
  - Land: 0.52 sq mi (1.34 km^{2})
  - Water: 0 sq mi (0.00 km^{2})
- Elevation: 889 ft (271 m)

Population (2020)
  - Total: 145
  - Density: 279.4/sq mi (107.89/km^{2})
- Time zone: UTC-5 (Eastern (EST))
  - Summer (DST): UTC-4 (EDT)
- ZIP code: 47019
- Area codes: 812, 930
- GNIS feature ID: 2587017

East Enterprise is an unincorporated census-designated place in central Cotton Township, Switzerland County, in the U.S. state of Indiana. Although East Enterprise is unincorporated, it has a post office, with the ZIP code of 47019. As of the 2020 census, East Enterprise had a population of 145.

== History ==
The post office at East Enterprise has been in operation since 1864, which established the current name of the community. Old variant names of the community include Allensville and Clapboard Corner.

== Geography ==
The community lies at the intersection of State Roads 56 and 250 northeast of the town of Vevay, the county seat of Switzerland County.

== Demographics ==
Historical population
Census	Pop.	Note	%±
2020	145		—
U.S. Decennial Census

According to the 2012-2016 American Community Survey, there are 155 housing units with a median housing value of $111,100 and a median housing income of $32,633. The male median income is $31,328 while the female median income is $25,694. Concurrently, 55.7% of the population lives in poverty, 75.1% have obtained a high school education, and 12.8% do not have health care. 1 military veteran resides within the community.
