= Cotton Township, Switzerland County, Indiana =

Cotton Township
- Township
- Location in Switzerland County
- Coordinates: 38°52′17″N 85°00′58″W
- Country: United States
- State: Indiana
- County: Switzerland

Government
  - Type: Indiana township

Area
  - Total: 36.04 sq mi (93.3 km^{2})
  - Land: 35.99 sq mi (93.2 km^{2})
  - Water: 0.06 sq mi (0.16 km^{2}) 0.17%
- Elevation: 883 ft (269 m)

Population (2020)
  - Total: 1,808
  - Density: 50.24/sq mi (19.40/km^{2})
- ZIP codes: 47011, 47019, 47020, 47038, 47043
- GNIS feature ID: 453248

Cotton Township is one of six townships in Switzerland County, Indiana, United States. As of the 2020 census, its population was 1,808 and it contained 717 housing units.

Historical population
Census	Pop.	Note	%±
1890	1,401		—
1900	1,345		−4.0%
1910	1,259		−6.4%
1920	1,172		−6.9%
1930	1,050		−10.4%
1940	1,034		−1.5%
1950	931		−10.0%
1960	879		−5.6%
1970	869		−1.1%
1980	1,009		16.1%
1990	1,214		20.3%
2000	1,476		21.6%
2010	2,040		38.2%
2020	1,808		−11.4%
Source: US Decennial Census

== Geography ==
According to the 2010 census, the township has a total area of 36.04 square miles (93.3 km^{2}), of which 35.99 square miles (93.2 km^{2}) (or 99.86%) is land and 0.06 square miles (0.16 km^{2}) (or 0.17%) is water.

=== Unincorporated towns ===
- Allensville at 38.873116°N 85.020229°W
- East Enterprise at 38.872838°N 84.988006°W
- Fairview at 38.873393°N 85.080786°W

(This list is based on USGS data and may include former settlements.)

=== Cemeteries ===
The township contains these four cemeteries: Allensville, Bovard, Pelser and Stow.

=== Major highways ===
- Indiana State Road 56
- Indiana State Road 250

== School districts ==
- Switzerland County School Corporation

== Political districts ==
- Indiana's 9th congressional district
- State House District 68
- State Senate District 45
