= National Register of Historic Places listings in Gallatin County, Kentucky =

Location of Gallatin County in Kentucky

This is a list of the National Register of Historic Places listings in Gallatin County, Kentucky.

It is intended to be a complete list of the properties on the National Register of Historic Places in Gallatin County, Kentucky, United States. The locations of National Register properties for which the latitude and longitude coordinates are included below, may be seen in a map.

There are 4 properties listed on the National Register in the county.

This National Park Service list is complete through NPS recent listings posted December 12, 2025.

== Current listings ==
	Name on the Register	Image	Date listed	Location	City or town	Description
1	Dr. Lucy Dupuy Montz House	Dr. Lucy Dupuy Montz House	March 30, 1978 (#78001333)	200 W. High St. 38°47′00″N 84°54′17″W	Warsaw	
2	Henry C. Peak House	Henry C. Peak House	April 10, 1980 (#80001530)	Sparta Pike; 38°46′54″N 84°54′05″W	Warsaw	
3	Benjamin F. Turley House	Benjamin F. Turley House	March 7, 1979 (#79000989)	2.5 miles (4 km) north of Sparta on Kentucky Route 35; 38°41′56″N 84°54′43″W	Sparta	
4	Warsaw Historic District	Warsaw Historic District	July 29, 1982 (#82002699)	Roughly bounded by W. High, E. Franklin, Washington, Market, Main, 3rd, 4th, and Cross Sts. 38°46′55″N 84°54′02″W	Warsaw	

== See also ==
- List of National Historic Landmarks in Kentucky
- National Register of Historic Places listings in Kentucky
