= Indiana State Road 156 =

State highway in Indiana, United States

State Road 156
- SR 156 highlighted in red

Route information
- Maintained by INDOT
- Length: 27.233 mi (43.827 km)

Major junctions
- West end: SR 56 at Vevay
- East end: SR 56 near Rising Sun

Location
- Country: United States
- State: Indiana
- Counties: Ohio, Switzerland

Highway system
- Indiana State Highway System; Interstate; US; State; Scenic
| ← SR 154 | → SR 157 |

State Road 156 (SR 156) is a part of the Indiana State Road that runs between Vevay and Rising Sun, passing through Florence, in US state of Indiana. The 27.15 miles (43.69 km) of SR 156 that lie within Indiana serve as a minor highway. None of the highway is listed on the National Highway System. SR 156 is mostly a rural two-lane highway, passing through farmland and residential properties. SR 156 was first designated as a state road in 1931. The highway replaced the original State Road 58 designation of the highway which dated back to 1927. SR 58 ran from Vevay through Florence to Patriot and ended in Rising Sun.

== Route description ==
SR 156 begins at an intersection with SR 56 in Vevay and it heads northeast. The highway passes through residential properties before leaving Vevay. After leaving Vevay the route enters rural farmland, with some woodlands, as a two-lane highway. The road has an intersection with SR 101 and passes by the Markland Dam. The dam carries SR 101 across the Ohio River and into Kentucky. After passing the dam SR 156 passes through Florence, parallel to the Ohio River. After passing through Florence the highway curves north, towards Patriot. In Patriot the route has an intersection with SR 250 and the highway begins to curve northeast again. After the Patriot the road curves west-northwest, before entering Ohio County. SR 156 ends at an intersection with SR 56 in rural Ohio County, just south of Rising Sun.

No section of State Road 156 in Indiana is included in the National Highway System (NHS). The NHS is a network of highways that are identified as being most important for the economy, mobility and defense of the nation. The highway is maintained by the Indiana Department of Transportation (INDOT) like all other state roads in the state. The department tracks the traffic volumes along all state roads as a part of its maintenance responsibilities using a metric called average annual daily traffic (AADT). This measurement is a calculation of the traffic level along a segment of roadway for any average day of the year. In 2010, INDOT figured that lowest traffic levels were 1,400 vehicles and 100 commercial vehicles used the highway daily between Florence and Patriot. The peak traffic volumes were 6,180 vehicles and 500 commercial vehicles AADT along the section of SR 156 at is within Vevay.

== History ==
SR 156 was planned as SR 58 in 1927 and opened in 1928 as SR 58. SR 58 was changed to its current SR 156 in 1931 and SR 58 was moved to a new road in western Indiana. The route and number has not changed since 1931.

== Major intersections ==
| County | Location | mi | km | Destinations | Notes |
|---|---|---|---|---|---|
| Switzerland | Vevay | 0.000 | 0.000 | SR 56 to SR 262 | Western terminus of SR 156 |
| Switzerland | York Township | 6.195– 6.349 | 9.970– 10.218 | SR 101 south – Warsaw, KY, Ghent, KY | Northern terminus of the southern section of SR 101; To I–71 and US 42 |
| Switzerland | Patriot | 17.560 | 28.260 | SR 250 west – East Enterprise | Eastern terminus of SR 250 |
| Ohio | Randolph Township | 27.233 | 43.827 | SR 56 to SR 129 | Eastern terminus of SR 156 |
1.000 mi = 1.609 km; 1.000 km = 0.621 mi
