= Indiana State Road 101 =

State highway in Indiana, United States

State Road 101
- SR 101 highlighted in red

Route information
- Maintained by INDOT
- Length: 79.291 mi (127.606 km)
- Existed: 1932–present

Southern segment
- Length: 0.560 mi (901 m)
- South end: KY 1039 near Florence
- North end: SR 156 near Florence

South central segment
- Length: 17.477 mi (28.127 km)
- South end: US 50 near Milan
- North end: I-74 near Penntown

North central segment
- Length: 16.271 mi (26.186 km)
- South end: US 52 / SR 1 in Brookville
- North end: US 27 / SR 44 in Liberty

Northern segment
- Length: 44.983 mi (72.393 km)
- South end: SR 124 near Pleasant Mills
- Major intersections: US 33 in Pleasant Mills; US 224 in Rivare; US 30 near Townley; US 24 near Woodburn
- North end: SR 1 / SR 8 near Newville

Location
- Country: United States
- State: Indiana
- Counties: Adams, Allen, DeKalb, Franklin, Ripley, Switzerland, Union

Highway system
- Indiana State Highway System; Interstate; US; State; Scenic
← I-94	→ SR 103

State Road 101 in the U.S. state of Indiana is a north–south state highway in the eastern portion of Indiana that exists in four sections with a combined length of 79.42 miles (127.81 km).

== Route description ==
Only the segment of SR 101 that is concurrent with the U.S. Route 33 (US 33) is listed as a part of the National Highway System (NHS). The NHS is a network of highways that are identified as being most important for the economy, mobility and defense of the nation. The highway is maintained by the Indiana Department of Transportation (INDOT) like all other state roads in Indiana. The department tracks the traffic volumes along all state roads as a part of its maintenance responsibilities, using a metric called average annual daily traffic (AADT). This measurement is a calculation of the traffic level along a segment of roadway for any average day of the year. In 2010, INDOT figured that lowest traffic levels were the 710 vehicles and 60 commercial vehicles used the highway daily between SR 124 and US 33. The peak traffic volumes were 5,740 vehicles and 450 commercial vehicles AADT between Sunman and I–74.

=== Southern section ===
The southernmost portion of the route is 0.48 miles (0.77 km) long and connects SR 156 in Switzerland County with Kentucky Route 1039, which connects to Interstate 71 and U.S. Route 42 near the Kentucky Speedway by crossing the Ohio River on the Markland Dam. Before expansion of the Speedway and extension of KY 1039, the route connected to Kentucky Route 1188, which ended just past the Ohio River at U.S. 42.

=== South central section ===
The second portion of SR 101 is 17.47 miles (28.12 km) long and is within Ripley County. This sections of SR 101 begins at U.S. Route 50 (US 50) and heads north towards Milan. The road passes through rural farmland with a few houses as a two-lane highway. The road turns towards the northeast just south of SR 48. After SR 48 the highway turns back due north. This section ends at an interchange with Interstate 74 (I–74) in Penntown.

=== North central section ===
The third portion of SR 101 is 16.44 miles (26.46 km) long and starts at US 52 and SR 1 in Brookville. SR 101 runs concurrent with SR 1 north and then SR 101 heads northeast, leaving SR 1. The highway curves around Brookville Lake and continues due north towards Liberty. The road crosses into Union County and turns northeast again, ending at an intersection with US 27 and SR 44 in Liberty.

=== Northern section ===
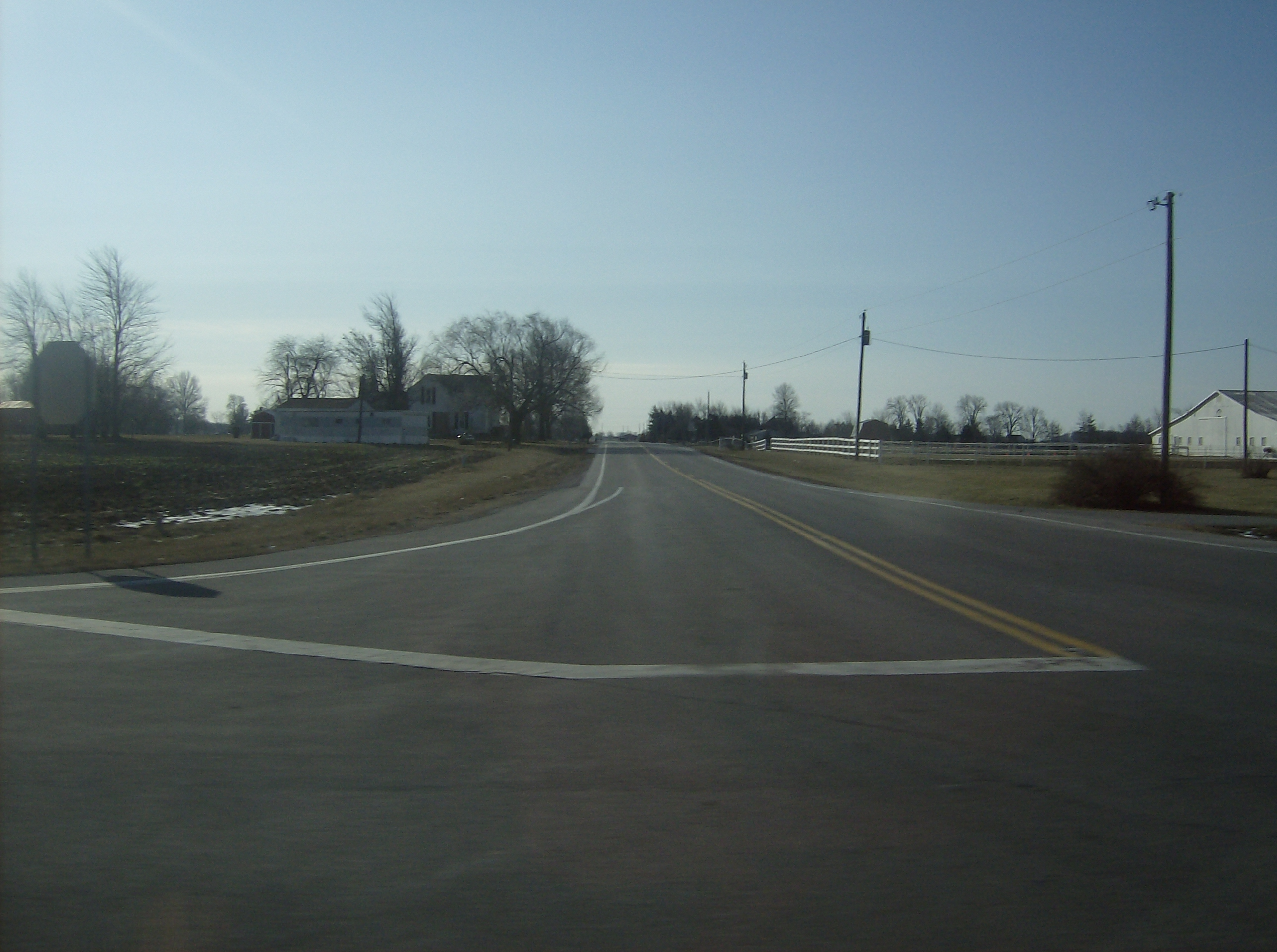
Along State Road 101 at its intersection with U.S. Route 224

The fourth and final portion is 45.03 miles (72.47 km) long and has its southern terminus at SR 124 in southeastern Adams County and heads north passing through farmland. The road enters Pleasant Mills and has a short concurrency with US 33. North of Pleasant Mills, the road crosses over the St. Marys River. After the river, the road enters Rivare and starts a concurrency with US 224. The concurrency heads west leaving Rivare heading towards Decatur. The concurrency ends when SR 101 turns back north and US 224 continues towards the west. SR 101 crosses into Allen County and has an intersection with US 30 near Townley. After US 30, the road has an all-way stop at old SR 14, now known as Dawkins Road. After Dawkins Road the road crosses the Norfolk Southern Railway. Then the road enters Woodburn and makes a sharp curve heading towards the east, followed by another curve back north. North of Woodburn, the highway has an interchange with US 24 and crosses the Maumee River. After the river, the road makes a sharp curve towards the west, followed by a sharp curve back north. North of the curves the route has an intersection with SR 37 and crosses into DeKalb County, within which it crosses the St. Joseph River. The northern terminus of SR 101 at an intersection with SR 8 and SR 1.

== Major intersections ==
County	Location	mi	km	Destinations	Notes
Gallatin	Warsaw	0.000	0.000	KY 1039 south	Southern terminus of SR 101
Ohio River		0.000	0.000	Markland Locks and Dam	
Switzerland	Florence	0.560	0.901	SR 156	Northern terminus of the southern section of SR 101
Switzerland	Gap in route				
Ripley	Washington Township	0.561	0.903	US 50 – Versailles, Dillsboro	Southern terminus of the second section of SR 101
Ripley	Milan	6.394	10.290	SR 350 – Osgood, Aurora	
Ripley	Franklin Township	11.833	19.043	SR 48 – Napoleon, Lawrenceburg	
Ripley	Adams Township	17.432	28.054	SR 46 – Batesville	
Ripley	Adams Township	17.992– 18.037	28.955– 29.028	I-74 – Indianapolis, Cincinnati	Exit number 156 on I-74; northern terminus of the second section of SR 101
Gap in route
Franklin	Brookville			US 52 / SR 1 south to SR 252 – Rushville, Lawrenceburg, Cincinnati	Southern terminus of the third section of SR 101; Southern end of SR 1 concurrency
Franklin	Brookville	18.038	29.029	SR 1 north – Connersville	Northern end of SR 1 concurrency
Union	Liberty	34.308	55.213	US 27 / SR 44 – Connersville, Richmond, Cincinnati	
Gap in route
Adams	Pleasant Mills	34.309	55.215	SR 124 – Monroe, Willshire	Southern terminus of the northern section of SR 101
Adams	Pleasant Mills	36.401	58.582	US 33 south – Willshire, OH	Southern end of US 33 concurrency
Adams	Pleasant Mills	36.574	58.860	US 33 north – Decatur	Northern end of US 33 concurrency
Adams	Rivare	40.927	65.866	US 224 east - Van Wert	Eastern end of US 224 concurrency
Adams	Rivare	41.927	67.475	US 224 west – Decatur	Western end of US 224 concurrency
Allen	Townley	54.195	87.218	US 30 – Fort Wayne, New Haven, Van Wert	
Allen	Townley	54.459	87.643	Lincoln Highway (Old US 30)	
Allen	Woodburn	63.871– 64.062	102.790– 103.098	US 24 – Fort Wayne, Toledo	
Allen	Halls Corners	70.704	113.787	SR 37 – Fort Wayne, Hicksville	
DeKalb	Newville	79.291	127.606	SR 1 / SR 8 – Auburn, Butler, Hicksville	Northern terminus of SR 101
1.000 mi = 1.609 km; 1.000 km = 0.621 mi: Concurrency terminus

== See also ==
- List of Indiana state highways
