= Carroll Lee Cropper Bridge =

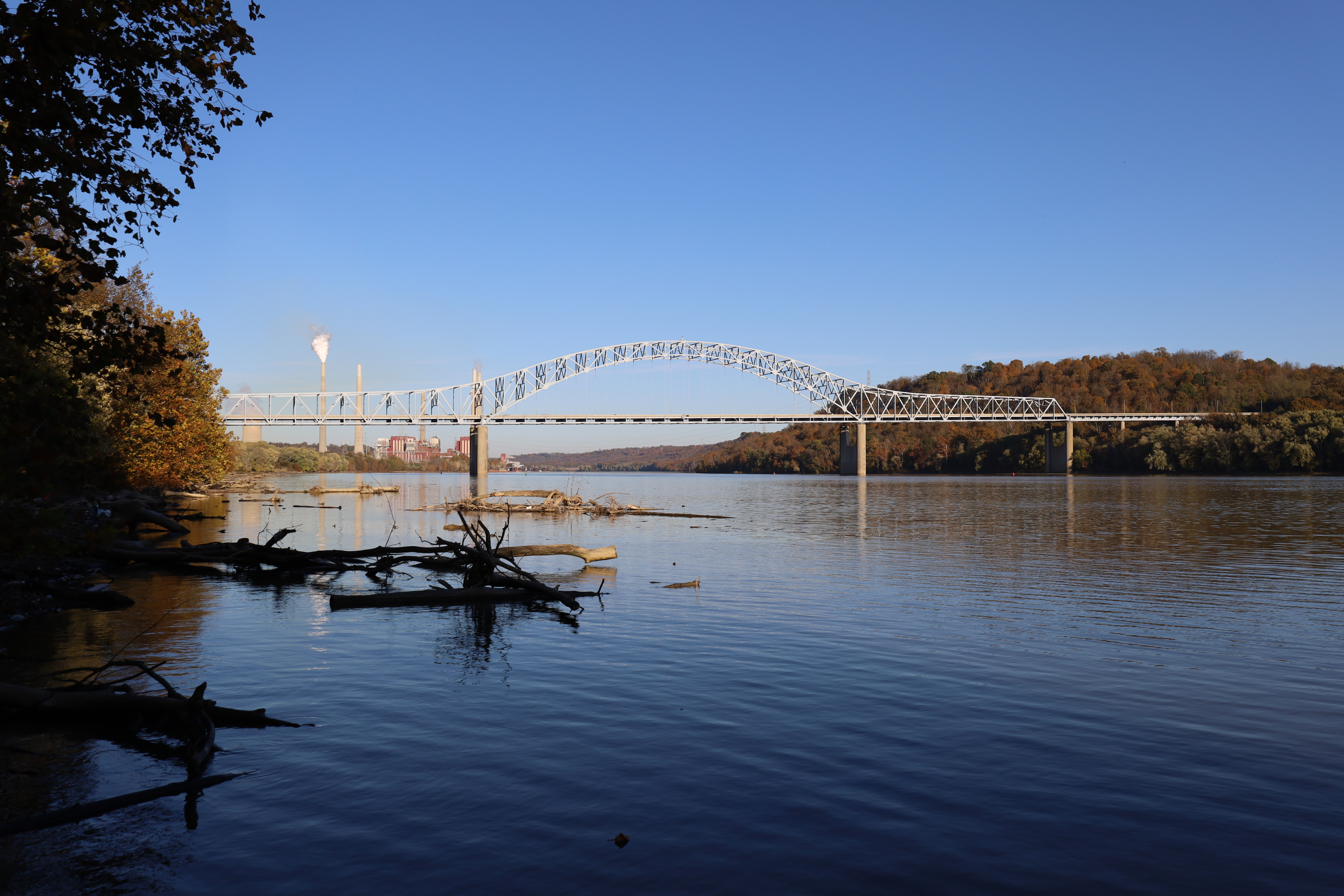
- The bridge in 2021
- Coordinates: 39°06′13″N 84°49′32″W
- Carries: 4 lanes of I-275
- Crosses: Ohio River
- Locale: Kentucky–Indiana near Greendale, Indiana
- Named for: Judge Carroll Lee Cropper
- Maintained by: Kentucky Transportation Cabinet

Characteristics
- Design: Arch-shaped truss bridge
- Material: Steel
- Total length: 1,759 feet (536 m)
- Longest span: 748 feet (228 m)

History
- Opened: 1977

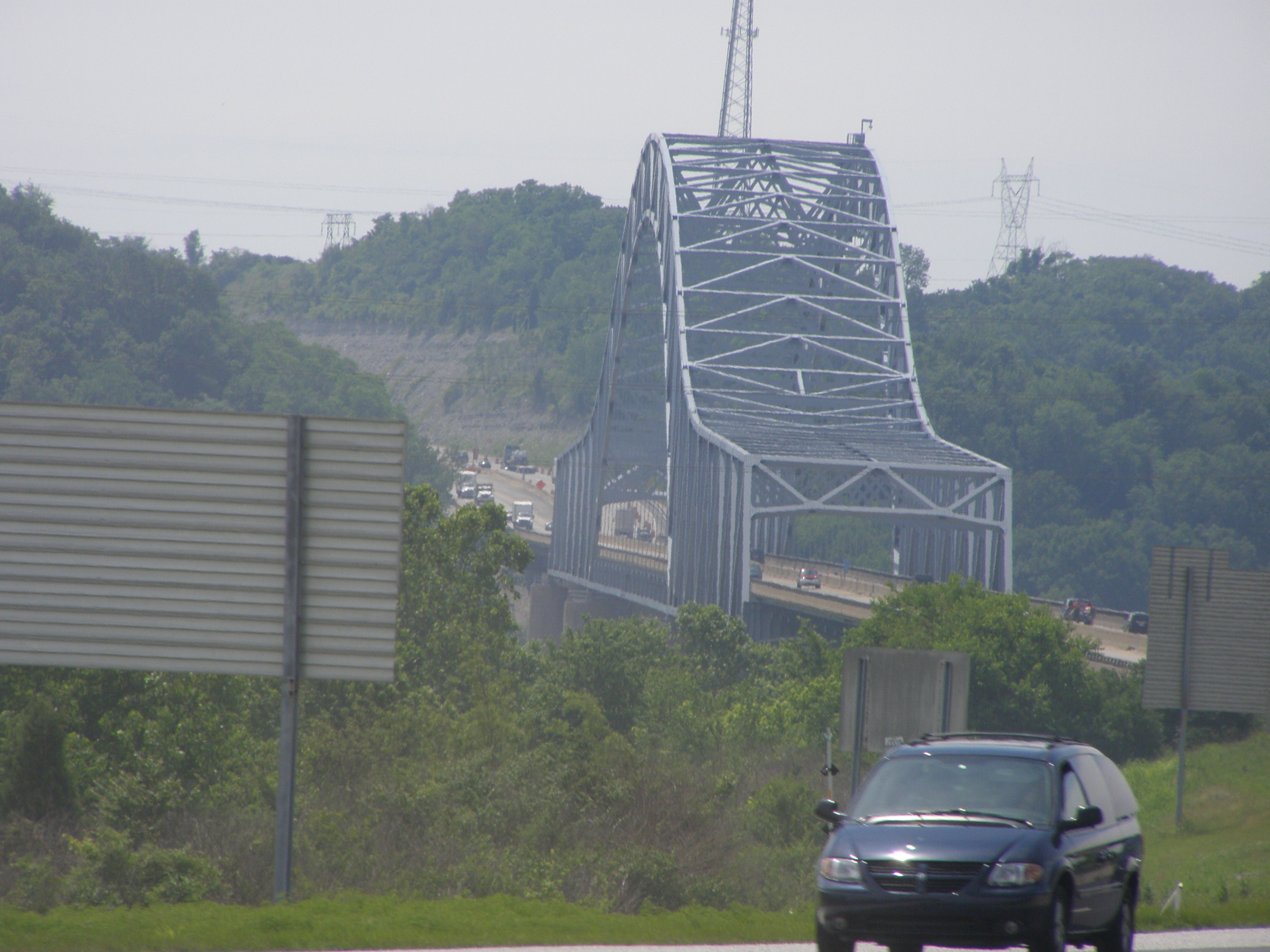
Kentucky approach to the Caroll Lee Cropper Bridge (I-275), around Cincinnati, Ohio, over the Ohio River between Kentucky and Constance, Indiana

The Carroll Lee Cropper Bridge is a continuous steel arch-shaped truss bridge over the Ohio River between Indiana and Kentucky. Built between 1968 and 1977, the four-lane arched truss span provides a western Ohio River crossing for the Interstate 275 beltway around the Cincinnati area. The section of Interstate 275 on the Cropper bridge is the only Interstate highway in the Cincinnati, Ohio area that goes between Indiana and Kentucky.

The bridge is the only highway bridge crossing for 20 miles (32 km) west of the Cincinnati downtown area. The Markland Locks and Dam, which carries Indiana State Road 101 and Kentucky Route 1039, is 40 miles (64 km) south and west of the Cropper Bridge.

== History ==
The bridge is named for Boone County Judge Carroll Lee Cropper.

Cropper became Boone County judge in 1942 and served for the next 20 years. He was born in a farm house near Bullittsburg Baptist Church in 1897 and graduated from Burlington High School in 1916. He served in World War I and after returning settled on his family farm, eventually becoming a cashier at the Boone County Deposit Bank. He served as a state representative for 12 years beginning in 1934. Upon the death of Judge Nathaniel E. Riddell in 1942, Cropper was appointed to finish the unexpired term. The next year he was elected to his first full term. The position Cropper held is the equivalent of today's county judge/executive; prior to voters' approval of the Judicial Reform Amendment to the state constitution in 1975, and its full implementation at the start of 1978, county judges in Kentucky also had judicial powers.

During his terms in office, Cropper witnessed Big Bone Lick becoming a state park, development of the airport now known as Cincinnati/Northern Kentucky International Airport, and the construction of Interstates 71 and 75. It was during Judge Cropper's terms that Boone County began its tremendous population growth. In a Kentucky Post interview in 1974, Cropper said "I'm not against progress, but I actually hate to see farms turn into subdivisions. It spoils the nature of the county. A lot of people are going to want to come here." During his 20 years in office, Judge Cropper saw the county increase in population 250 percent from approximately 10,000 to 25,000.

A Democrat, Cropper served as Boone County campaign manager for Franklin Roosevelt's first campaign for the presidency in 1932. He also served as chair of the Boone County Democratic Party. Upon his retirement in 1962, Cropper became president of the People's Deposit Bank and five years later chairman of the board. He died in 1976, and is buried along with his wife Kathryn in Bullittsburg Baptist Cemetery.

== See also ==
- List of crossings of the Ohio River
