= Kentucky Route 1039 =

State highway in Kentucky, United States

Kentucky Route 1039
- KY 1039 highlighted in red

Route information
- Maintained by KYTC
- Length: 7.113 mi (11.447 km)
- Existed: 2006–present

Major junctions
- South end: KY 465 near Sparta
- I-71 near Sparta; US 42 near Warsaw
- North end: SR 101 at the Indiana state line

Location
- Country: United States
- State: Kentucky
- Counties: Gallatin

Highway system
- Kentucky State Highway System; Interstate; US; State; Parkways
← KY 1038	→ KY 1040

Kentucky Route 1039 is a 7.113-mile state highway in Kentucky that runs from KY 465 northwest of Sparta to SR 101 at the Indiana state line west of Warsaw on the Markland Dam Bridge. KY 1039 meets Interstate 71 less than a mile in length. Drivers wishing to access the Kentucky Speedway using I-71 north must use KY 1039 to and from the speedway until Speedway Boulevard goes to the right toward the speedway. KY 1039 has ramps to US 42 before crossing onto the Markland Dam Bridge.

== Route description ==
KY 1039 begins at an intersection with KY 465 near Sparta in Gallatin County, heading south on a two-lane undivided road. The route makes a hairpin turn to the northwest and comes to a bridge over KY 465 before it comes to an interchange with I-71. Past this interchange, the road continues north through a mix of fields and woods with some development, coming to an intersection with KY 1130 (Speedway Boulevard), which provides access to Kentucky Speedway. KY 1039 continues north through more rural areas and comes to an interchange with US 42 west of Warsaw. Following this, the road crosses over the Ohio River on the Markland Dam Bridge. Here, KY 1039 comes to its northern terminus at the Indiana border, where it continues as SR 101.

== Major intersections ==
County	Location	mi	km	Destinations	Notes
Gallatin	Sparta	0.000	0.000	KY 465 (Boone Road)	
Gallatin	Sparta	0.645	1.038	I-71	I-71 exit 55
Gallatin	Sparta	1.771	2.850	KY 1130 north (Speedway Boulevard)	
Gallatin	Warsaw	6.537	10.520	US 42	Interchange
Ohio River		6.978	11.230	Markland Dam Bridge	
Switzerland	Florence	6.978	11.230	SR 101 north	
1.000 mi = 1.609 km; 1.000 km = 0.621 mi

== History ==
Kentucky Route 1188
- Location: Gallatin County, Kentucky
- Length: 0.8 mi (1,300 m)
- Existed: 2006

Kentucky Route 1188 (KY 1188) was a 0.8-mile (1.3 km) state highway in Kentucky. Before the construction of KY 1039, KY 1188 ran from U.S. Route 42, up the present day ramp from US 42 to KY 1039 north, and across Markland Dam to the Indiana state line. It was decommissioned in 2006.
