= United States and America steamboat disaster =

Collision and sinking of two Ohio river steamboats

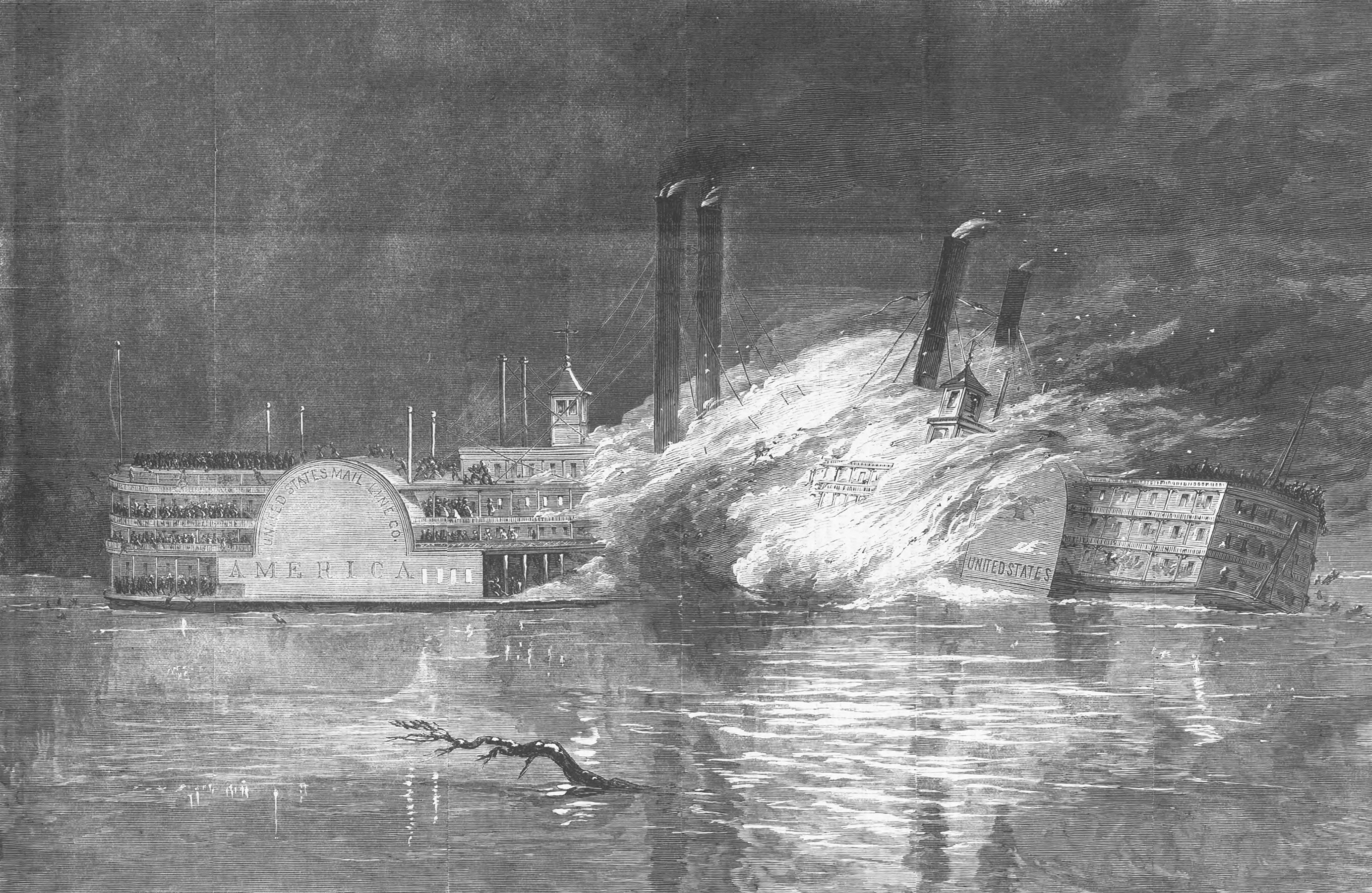
Artist's impression of the collision

The United States and America steamboat disaster was a collision between two US Mail Line Company ships on the Ohio River in 1868. Both ships were sunk and about seventy-four people died. The death toll makes this accident one of the worst Ohio River maritime disasters of all time.

On the night of 4 December 1868, sister ships owned by the US Mail Line Company collided on the Ohio River near Warsaw, Kentucky. Confusion among the pilots with the passing signals was the primary cause. The sidewheeler United States was struck by the sidewheeler America forcing barrels of flammable liquids into United States fireboxes. Both vessels became engulfed in flames and burned to the waterline and sank.

== Collision ==
United States and America were recently built steamships employed in daily passenger, freight and mail delivery between Louisville, Kentucky and Cincinnati, Ohio. Both were of classic double cabin side wheeler design and over 300 feet in length. They were reported to be the fastest packets on the river at the time. Both boats were owned by the US Mail Line Company and would routinely pass one another along the stretch of river near Warsaw Kentucky where a great bend in the river exists. The pilots had a routine of passing with the Cincinnati (upriver) boat would take the Kentucky side for the passage and the down bound boat would pass on the opposite Indiana side.

On the night of the deadly collision, the routine pilot on America had disembarked at Ghent, Kentucky for a family visit. A relief pilot unfamiliar with the routine passing agreement was at the helm. Lookouts on each boat spotted the other at a range of about 1 mile. The closing speed of the two vessels was about one mile every two minutes (30 miles per hour). America's relief pilot, a man named Captain Napoleon Jenkins, decided to signal for a two-whistle pass, meaning that the vessels would pass on the right. This is the opposite of the routine practice for these two vessels. The pilot on United States, unaware of relief pilot on the sister ship and impatient for a signal, preemptively signaled for a one-whistle pass (i.e. to pass on the left, as routine). Apparently, this steam whistle blast drowned out Jenkin's first whistle from America. The second blast was taken on United States as acknowledgment on the one-whistle (port side) pass. As a result, both boats turned for the Indiana side of the river.

The upbound boat, America, rammed the down bound sidewheeler United States just forward of midships. Approximately 75 people were on board each vessel, many who were in their cabins in their night clothes. The impact started a fire on United States when some flammable liquids were spilled and reached the firebox. The fire quickly spread on United States as the two vessels made for the nearby Indiana bank. America came to the aid of United States pulling along aside to provide escape for passengers and crew. The fire then spread to America.

Passengers and crew rushed to abandon the burning vessels and many acts of valor were documented. In the end, about seventy people perished on the United States along with four from America . Survivors were tended to by local farmers and citizens of Kentucky who made their way across on small craft. Both United States and America burned to the water line and sank. United States sank at the Indiana bank near a place called Rayl's landing. The burning America broke loose from shore and drifted downriver a few hundred yards and sank neat the mouth of Bryant's Creek, which enters the Ohio River in Switzerland County Indiana.

The entire event transpired over about 45 minutes from about 11:30 pm to shortly after midnight.

== Aftermath ==
Survivors were cared for by Switzerland County farm families and Gallatin County, Kentucky residents who had witnessed the fires. The U. S. Mail Line Company sent the steamer C. T. DuMont to the scene to return survivors to Cincinnati. The chief clerk sketched a map of the accident area that was published in the Cincinnati Daily. The death toll is uncertain due to the loss of the passenger manifest from United States, but the best estimate is 74 souls. Bodies were recovered for some time and along a great length of the Ohio - as far downriver as Madison Indiana. United States was determined to be salvageable and was raised by the salvage vessel Underwriter in early 1869. Its hull was rebuilt with the rebuilt vessel retaining the name United States. This vessel served the U. S. Mail Line Company for many more years. America was not salvaged and it's hull remains somewhere near the mouth of Bryant's creek. A 1967 barge accident caused the Markland Dam to lower the Ohio river level dramatically and the hull was visible. Markland Dam was built in 1959 and has raised the river level some 37 feet since the time of the accident.

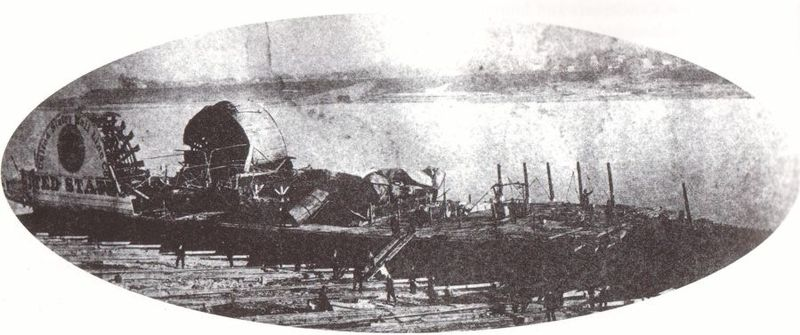
Burnt hulk of United States after salvage and tow to Cincinnati

An inquest was initiated by the Board of Steamboat Inspectors at Cincinnati to investigate the accident. Both pilots were found to be at fault. The board sanctioned Mr. Jacob Remlein, pilot on United States, for signaling before hearing the full signal from the upbound America, and Mr. Napoleon Jenkins, pilot on America, for not stopping at 800 yards distance when the passing signals made were in conflict. Lawsuits against U. S. Mail Line Company were filed in Indiana court, but none were ever fully adjudicated or settled due to confusion over jurisdiction on the Kentucky–Indiana state line. An insurance claim was paid to the company but came far short of the loss of the company's two finest steamers.

The death toll makes this accident one of the worst Ohio River maritime disaster of all time, along with Lucy Walker (1844) and Missouri (1866).
