= St. Marys Township, Adams County, Indiana =

Saint Marys Township
- Township
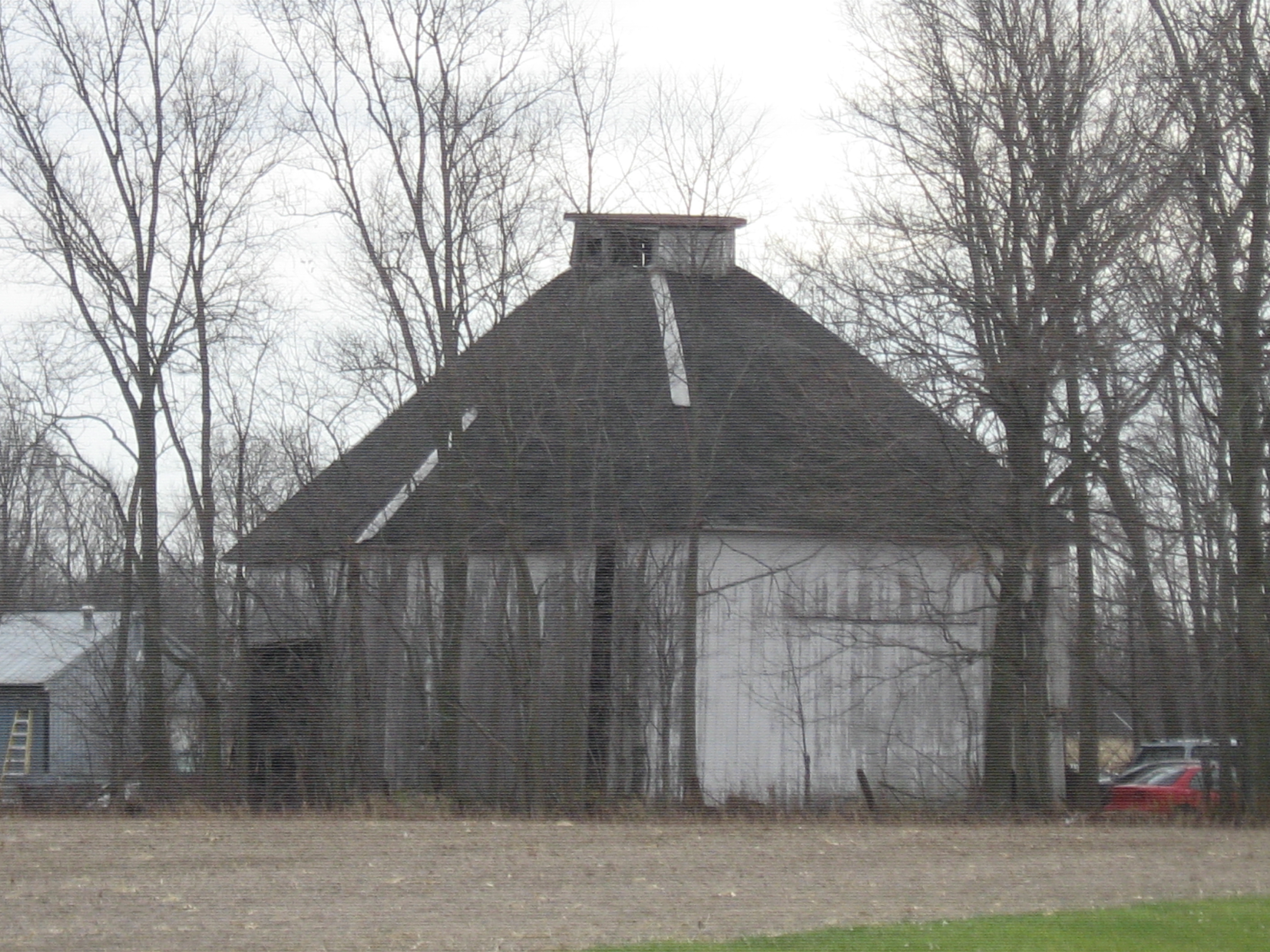
- The Ben Colter Polygonal Barn, a historic site in the township

- Location within Adams County
- Coordinates: 40°47′20″N 84°50′42″W
- Country: United States
- State: Indiana
- County: Adams

Government
  - Type: Indiana township

Area
  - Total: 24.58 sq mi (63.7 km^{2})
  - Land: 24.57 sq mi (63.6 km^{2})
  - Water: 0.01 sq mi (0.026 km^{2}) 0.04%
- Elevation: 784 ft (239 m)

Population (2020)
  - Total: 1,269
  - Density: 53.2/sq mi (20.5/km^{2})
- Time zone: UTC-5 (Eastern (EST))
  - Summer (DST): UTC-4 (EDT)
- ZIP code: 46733
- Area code: 260
- GNIS feature ID: 453821

Saint Marys Township is one of twelve townships in Adams County, Indiana. As of the 2020 census, its population was 1,269, down from 1,308 at the 2010 census.

== Geography ==
According to the 2010 census, the township has a total area of 24.58 square miles (63.7 km^{2}), of which 24.57 square miles (63.6 km^{2}) (or 99.96%) is land and 0.01 square miles (0.026 km^{2}) (or 0.04%) is water.

=== Unincorporated towns ===
- Pleasant Mills
- Rivare

=== Major highways ===
- US 33
- SR 101
- SR 124

=== Rivers ===
- Saint Mary's River

== School districts ==
- Adams Central Community Schools

== Political districts ==
- Indiana's 3rd congressional district
- State House District 79
- State Senate District 19
