= Interstate 275 bridge =

There are two bridges across the Ohio River on Interstate 275 (Ohio–Indiana–Kentucky):

- Carroll Lee Cropper Bridge, between Indiana and Kentucky
- Combs–Hehl Bridge, between Kentucky and Ohio
