= Markland, Indiana =

- Unincorporated community
- Location within Indiana Location within the United States
- Coordinates: 38°46′55″N 84°59′12″W
- Country: United States
- State: Indiana
- County: Switzerland
- Township: York
- Elevation: 469 ft (143 m)
- Time zone: UTC-5 (Eastern (EST))
  - Summer (DST): UTC-4 (EDT)
- ZIP code: 47043
- Area codes: 812, 930
- GNIS feature ID: 438623

Markland is an unincorporated community in York Township, Switzerland County, in the U.S. state of Indiana.

The nearby Markland Locks and Dam on the Ohio River takes its name from the community.

== History ==
Markland was laid out in 1874 by Charles Markland and named for him.

A post office was established at Markland in 1873, and remained in operation until it was discontinued in 1944.
