= Henry C. Peak House =

Historic house in Kentucky, United States

- U.S. National Register of Historic Places
- U.S. Historic district – Contributing property
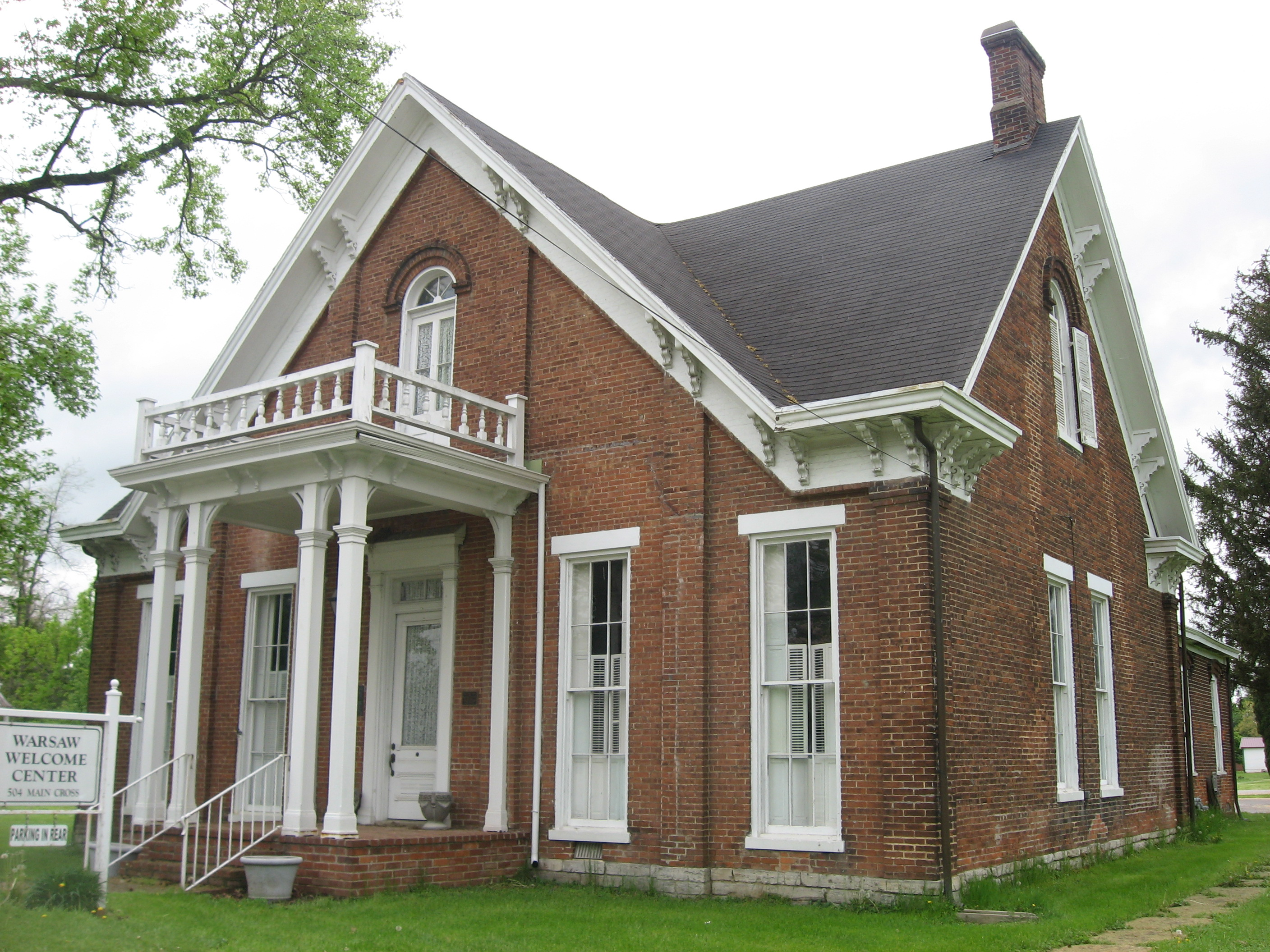

- Location within Kentucky Location within the United States
- Location: Sparta Pike, Warsaw, Kentucky
- Coordinates: 38°46′54″N 84°54′05″W
- Area: less than one acre
- Built: 1869
- Architectural style: Gothic Revival
- Part of: Warsaw Historic District (ID82002699)
- NRHP reference No.: 80001530

Significant dates
- Added to NRHP: April 10, 1980
- Designated CP: July 29, 1982

The Peak-Corkran House, located at Main Cross on Sparta Pike in Warsaw, Kentucky, was listed on the National Register of Historic Places in 1980.

It was built in 1869 by Henry Clay Peak (1832–1913), a Confederate veteran of the Civil War, who was also one of the first druggists in town.

He only lived here until 1881 – when he sold it to Horacio Turpin Chambers, whose wife Sallie Bond Chambers, was President of the Warsaw Women's Club in 1900. Their daughters Willie Chambers Bannister and Louise Chambers Corkran bequeathed the home to the Warsaw Women's Club in 1961. It remained the Warsaw Women's Club until the early 2000s. In 2005, the City of Warsaw signed a lease agreement to use the Peak-Corkran House as the Warsaw Welcome Center.

Currently, the home is now owned by the granddaughter of Harold Brown Weldon, who was also once President of the Warsaw Women's Club.

The Peak-Corkran home is "an example of the Gothic Revival style, embodying the cross-axis plan which appears to be unique to the Gallatin County area....the house exhibits a high degree of craftsmanship that makes it one of the best examples of this design in this region of northern Kentucky. The style combined with the plan (Gothic Revival, cross-axis) appears to be somewhat unusual for the regions outside northern Kentucky, but not uncommon however, in this particular area. The expertise and skill evident in the construction of this building makes it one of the superior examples of this design. The fine brickwork is one of the features of note. Also, the round arched hood molds on the second story windows are uncommonly well laid, with a deep but even profile."
