= Gallatin County High School (Kentucky) =

Coordinates: 38.78568°N 84.88903°W

Location
- 70 Wildcat Circle; Warsaw, Kentucky 41095; United States

Information
- Type: Public secondary
- School district: Gallatin County Schools
- Principal: Angela Lewis
- Teaching staff: 26.50 (FTE)
- Enrollment: 460 (2023–2024)
- Student to teacher ratio: 17.36
- Color
- Mascot: Wildcats
- Website: School website

Gallatin County High School, also known as Gallatin High School, is a public high school located in Warsaw, Kentucky, United States. It is the only high school in the Gallatin County School District. Angela Lewis is the school principal. The school's athletic teams are called the Wildcats.
