= Lucy Montz =

Dentist (1842–1922)

Lucy Montz (December 30, 1842 – March 23, 1922) was the first woman to be licensed to practice as a dentist in Kentucky.

== Early life and education ==
Lucy Ann Dupuy was born on December 30, 1842, in Warsaw, Kentucky, to John T. Dupuy and Henrietta (Ross) Dupuy. In 1860, she married Frank Montz in Louisville, Kentucky, and together they had one daughter who died in infancy. She was widowed at the age 20. Montz moved to Covington where she taught school. While teaching school, she studied at Cincinnati College of Dental Surgery, and graduated with honors in 1889.

== Dental career ==
After graduation, Montz became a member of the faculty of the Cincinnati College of Dental Surgery for several years. In 1893, at the age of 51, she relocated back to her home town of Warsaw and began a dental practice. She was admitted to the Kentucky Dental Association in 1893, and later that year was honored at the World's Columbian Exposition in Chicago as the only woman dentist in Kentucky. She continued to practice dentistry until 1921, when she retired due to illness.

== Death and legacy ==
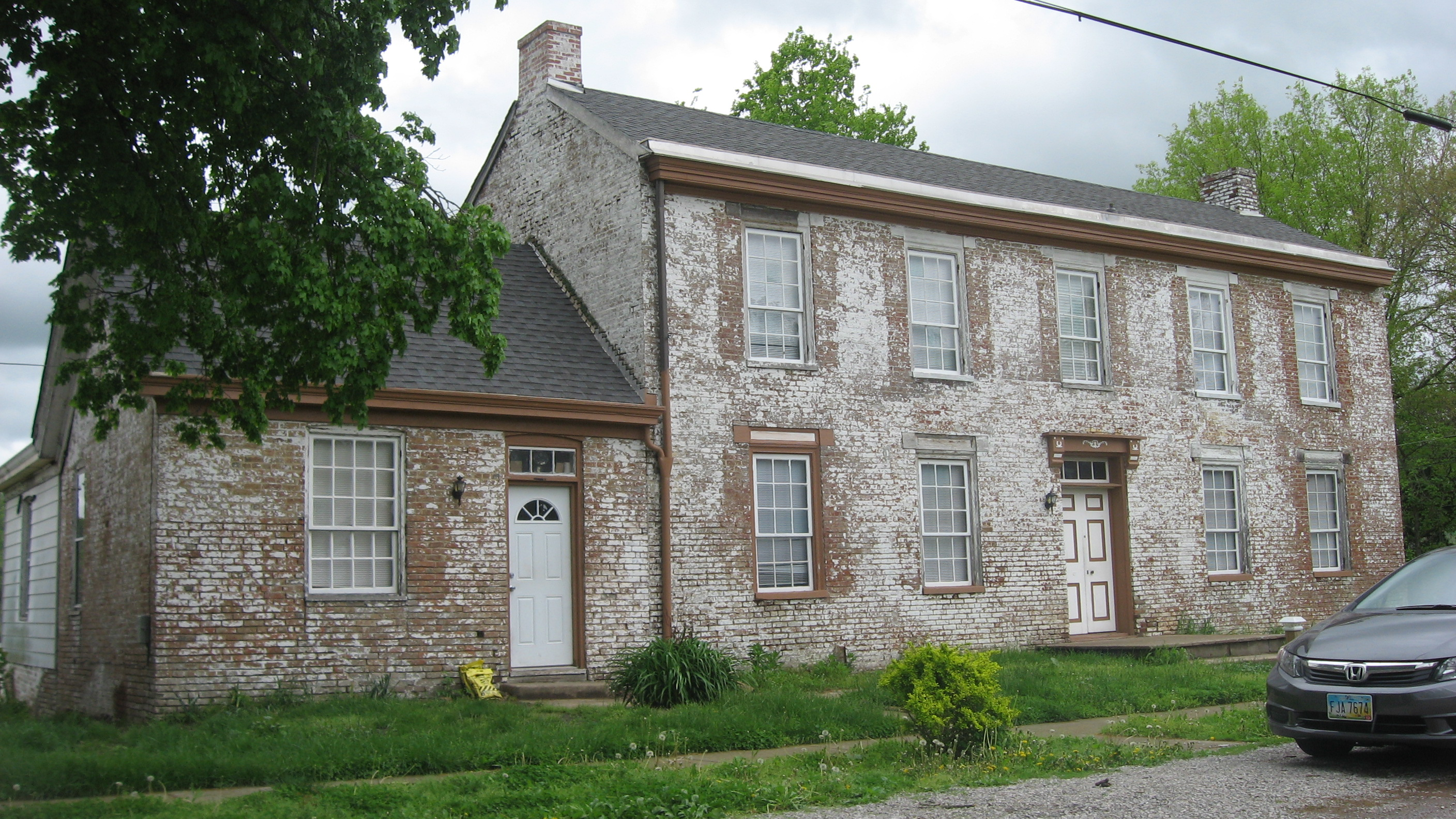
Dr. Lucy Dupuy Montz House, 200 W. High Street in Warsaw, Kentucky

After her retirement, Montz moved to Madison, Indiana, and died on March 23, 1922. She was buried in the family cemetery in Warsaw, Kentucky. The Dr. Lucy Dupuy Montz House in Warsaw is on the National Register of Historic Places.
