= Dr. Lucy Dupuy Montz House =

- U.S. National Register of Historic Places
- U.S. Historic district – Contributing property
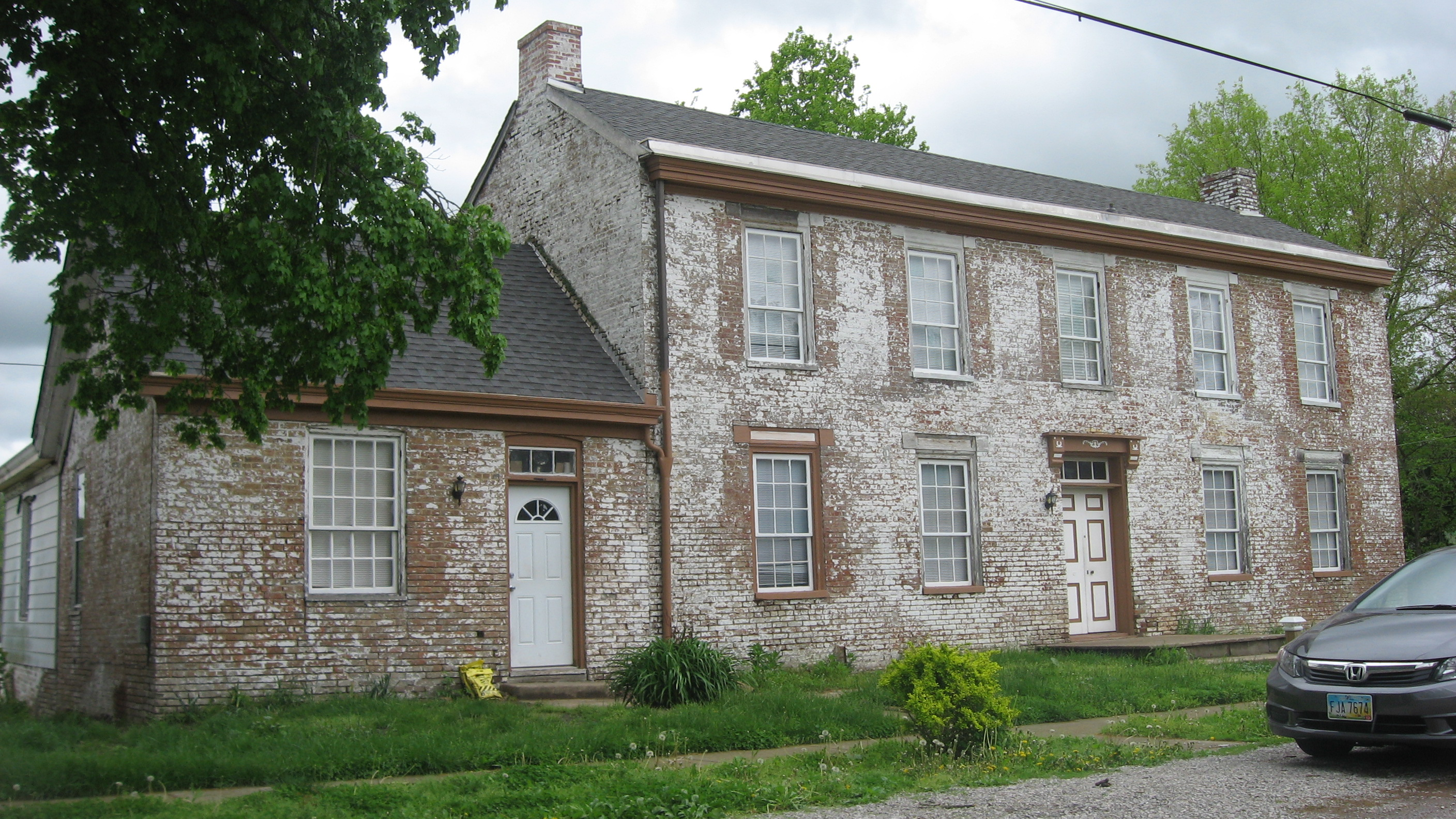
- Location: 200 W. High St., Warsaw, Kentucky
- Area: less than one acre
- Architectural style: Federal
- Part of: Warsaw Historic District (ID82002699)
- NRHP reference No.: 78001333

Significant dates
- Added to NRHP: March 30, 1978
- Designated CP: July 29, 1982

Dr. Lucy Dupuy Montz House is a historical building in Warsaw, Kentucky that was the location of Lucy Dupuy Montz home residence and dental practice. Montz was Kentucky's first woman dentist. In 1978, the building was listed on the National Register of Historic Places.
