= Warsaw Historic District (Warsaw, Kentucky) =

Historic district in Kentucky, United States

- U.S. National Register of Historic Places
- U.S. Historic district
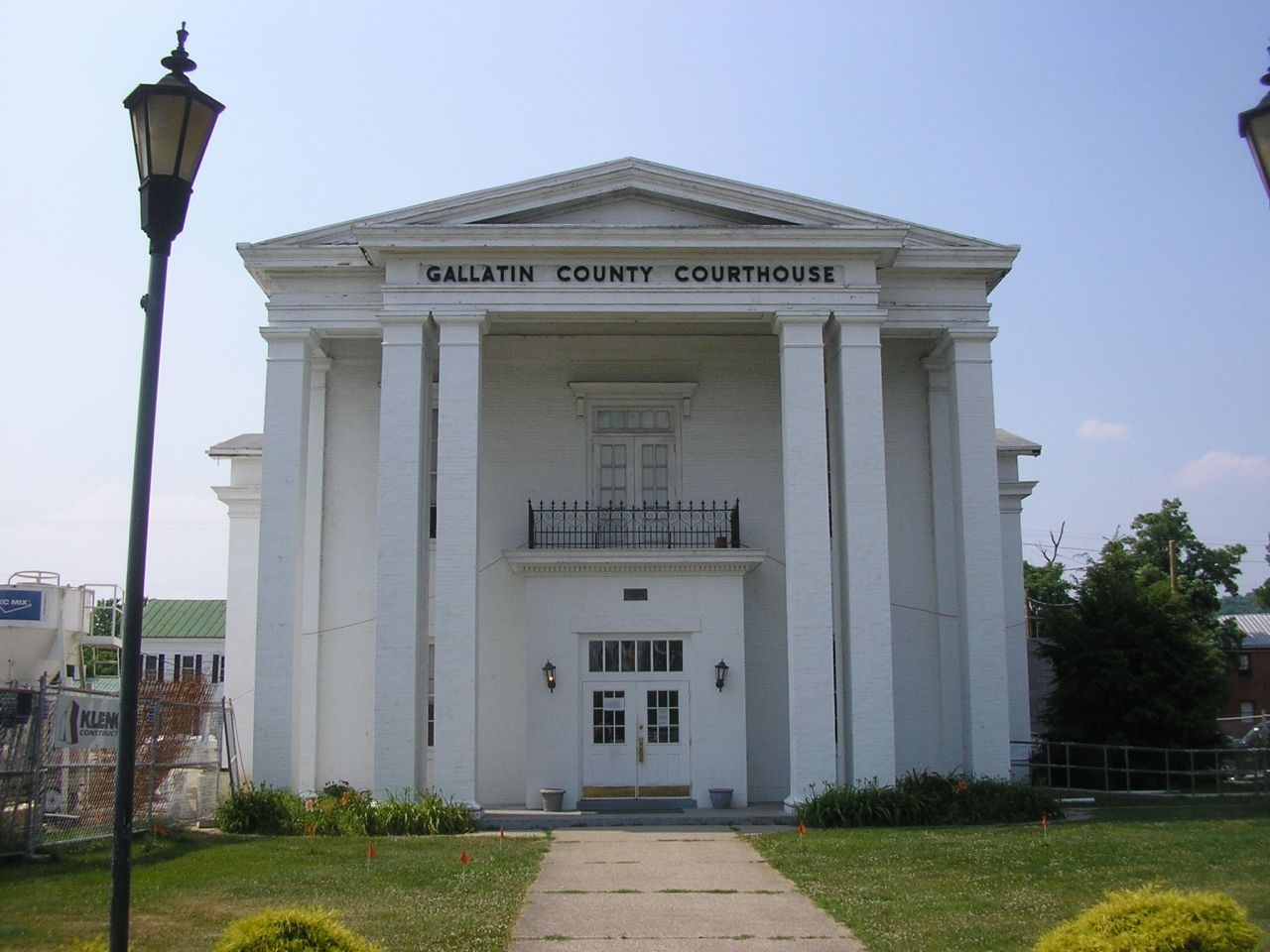
- Gallatin County Courthouse

- Location within Kentucky Location within the United States
- Location: Roughly bounded by W. High, E. Franklin, Washington, Market, Main, 3rd, 4th and Cross Sts., Warsaw, Kentucky
- Coordinates: 38°46′55″N 84°54′02″W
- Area: 65 acres (26 ha)
- Built: 1820
- Architectural style: Italianate, Gothic Revival
- NRHP reference No.: 82002699
- Added to NRHP: July 29, 1982

The Warsaw Historic District, in Warsaw, Kentucky, on the Ohio River, is a 65 acres (26 ha) historic district which was listed on the National Register of Historic Places in 1982. It is roughly bounded by W. High, E. Franklin, Washington, Market, Main, 3rd, 4th and Cross Sts. in Warsaw. The district included 118 contributing buildings.

It includes the Dr. Lucy Dupuy Montz House (at 200 High Street) and the Henry C. Peak House (Sparta Pike) which were listed on the National Register in 1978 and 1980.

The district includes all but eight buildings which were mapped in Warsaw in 1883; a small concentration of buildings on low-lying Locust Street were lost in floods since then.
