= Pleasant Mills, Indiana =

- Unincorporated community and Census-designated place
- Adams County's location in Indiana

- Location in Adams County
- Coordinates: 40°46′36″N 84°50′30″W
- Country: United States
- State: Indiana
- County: Adams
- Township: St. Marys
- Elevation: 797 ft (243 m)
- Time zone: UTC-5 (Eastern (EST))
  - Summer (DST): UTC-4 (EDT)
- ZIP code: 46733
- Area code: 260
- FIPS code: 18-60552
- GNIS feature ID: 2830298

Pleasant Mills is an unincorporated community in St. Marys Township, Adams County, in the U.S. state of Indiana.

== History ==
A post office was established at Pleasant Mills in 1850. Edward G. Coxen was named the Pleasant Mills Postmaster on January 16, 1850. It was named from its tranquil setting near a gristmill.

== Demographics ==
Historical population
Census	Pop.	Note	%±
1850	71		—
1870	80		—
U.S. Decennial Census

Pleasant Mills appeared as a separately-returned community in the U.S. Census twice, both times in the nineteenth century. Its highest officially-recorded population was 80 inhabitants in 1870.

The United States Census Bureau redefined Pittsburg as a census designated place in the 2022 American Community Survey.
