= Rivare, Indiana =

- Unincorporated community
- Adams County's location in Indiana

- Location in Adams County
- Coordinates: 40°48′44″N 84°50′29″W
- Country: United States
- State: Indiana
- County: Adams
- Township: St. Marys
- Named after: Antoine Rivare
- Elevation: 830 ft (250 m)
- Time zone: UTC-5 (Eastern (EST))
  - Summer (DST): UTC-4 (EDT)
- ZIP code: 46733
- Area code: 260
- FIPS code: 18-64692
- GNIS feature ID: 442068

Rivare is an unincorporated community in St. Marys Township, Adams County, in the U.S. state of Indiana.

== History ==
Rivare was named for Antoine Rivare, a Native American settler.
