= Benjamin F. Turley House =

Historic house in Kentucky, United States

- U.S. National Register of Historic Places
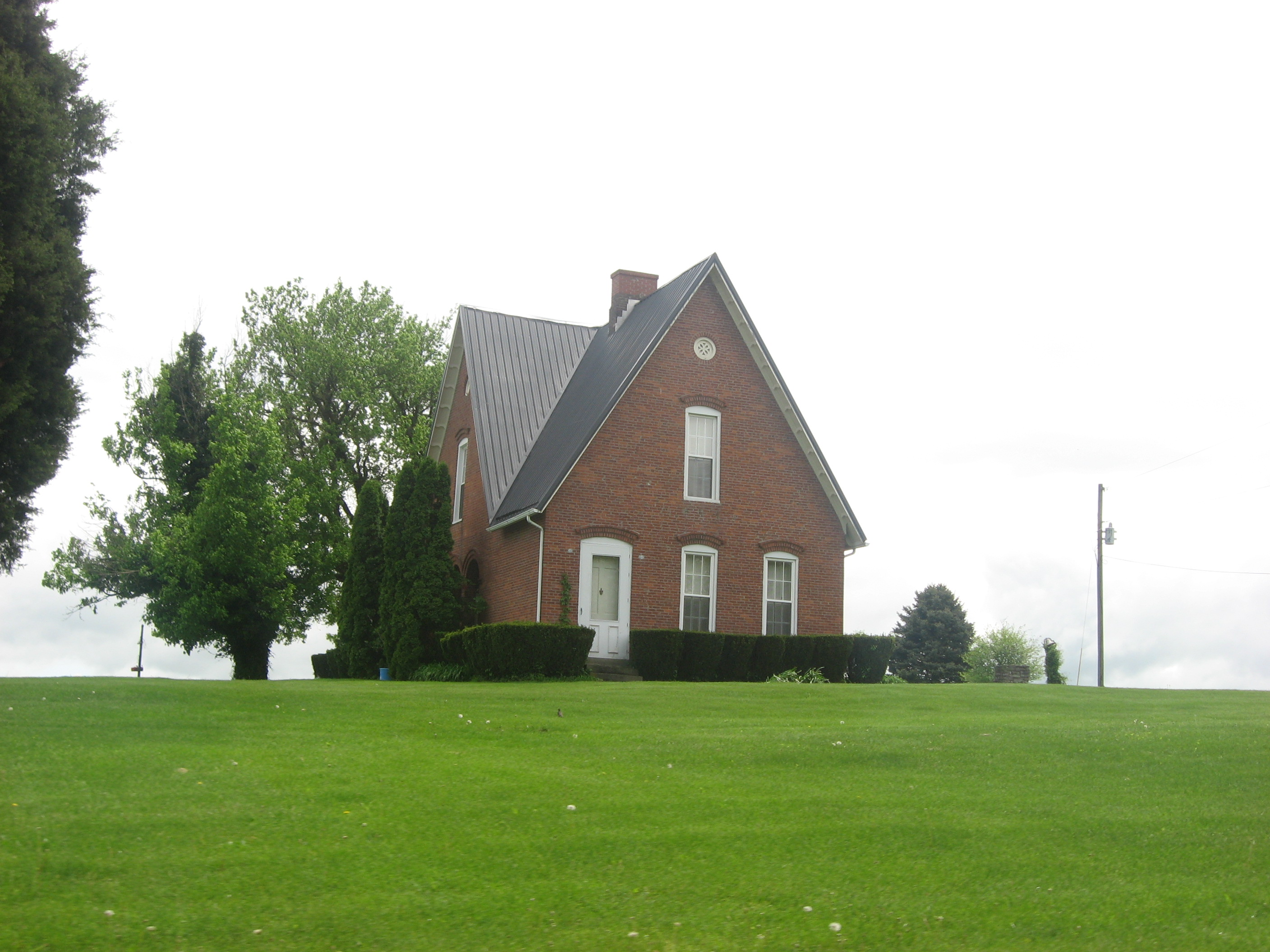
- House in 2013. Arched, enclosed porch is obscured on left side.

- Location within Kentucky Location within the United States
- Location: On Kentucky Route 35 2.5 miles (4.0 km) north of Sparta, Kentucky
- Coordinates: 38°41′56″N 84°54′43″W
- Area: 6 acres (2.4 ha)
- Built: 1865
- Architectural style: Gothic Revival
- NRHP reference No.: 79000989
- Added to NRHP: March 7, 1979

The Benjamin F. Turley House, near Sparta, Kentucky, is a Gothic Revival-style house built in 1865. It was listed on the National Register of Historic Places in 1979. The listing included two contributing buildings and a contributing site.

The house is a two-story brick Gothic Revival building built in 1865, on a fieldstone foundation. It was extended by a one-story addition in 1938. It has a distinctive enclosed porch with three Romanesque style arched openings.
