= Townley, Indiana =

- Unincorporated community
- Location within Indiana Location within the United States
- Coordinates: 41°01′05″N 84°51′50″W
- Country: United States
- State: Indiana
- County: Allen
- Township: Jackson
- Elevation: 771 ft (235 m)
- Time zone: UTC-5 (Eastern (EST))
  - Summer (DST): UTC-4 (EDT)
- ZIP code: 46773
- Area code: 260
- GNIS feature ID: 444836

Townley is an unincorporated community in Jackson Township, Allen County, Indiana, United States.

On Palm Sunday, 1920, Townley was decimated by an F4 tornado. Approximately 100 buildings were destroyed and 4 deaths resulted. Townley never rebuilt.
