= York Township, Switzerland County, Indiana =

York Township
- Township
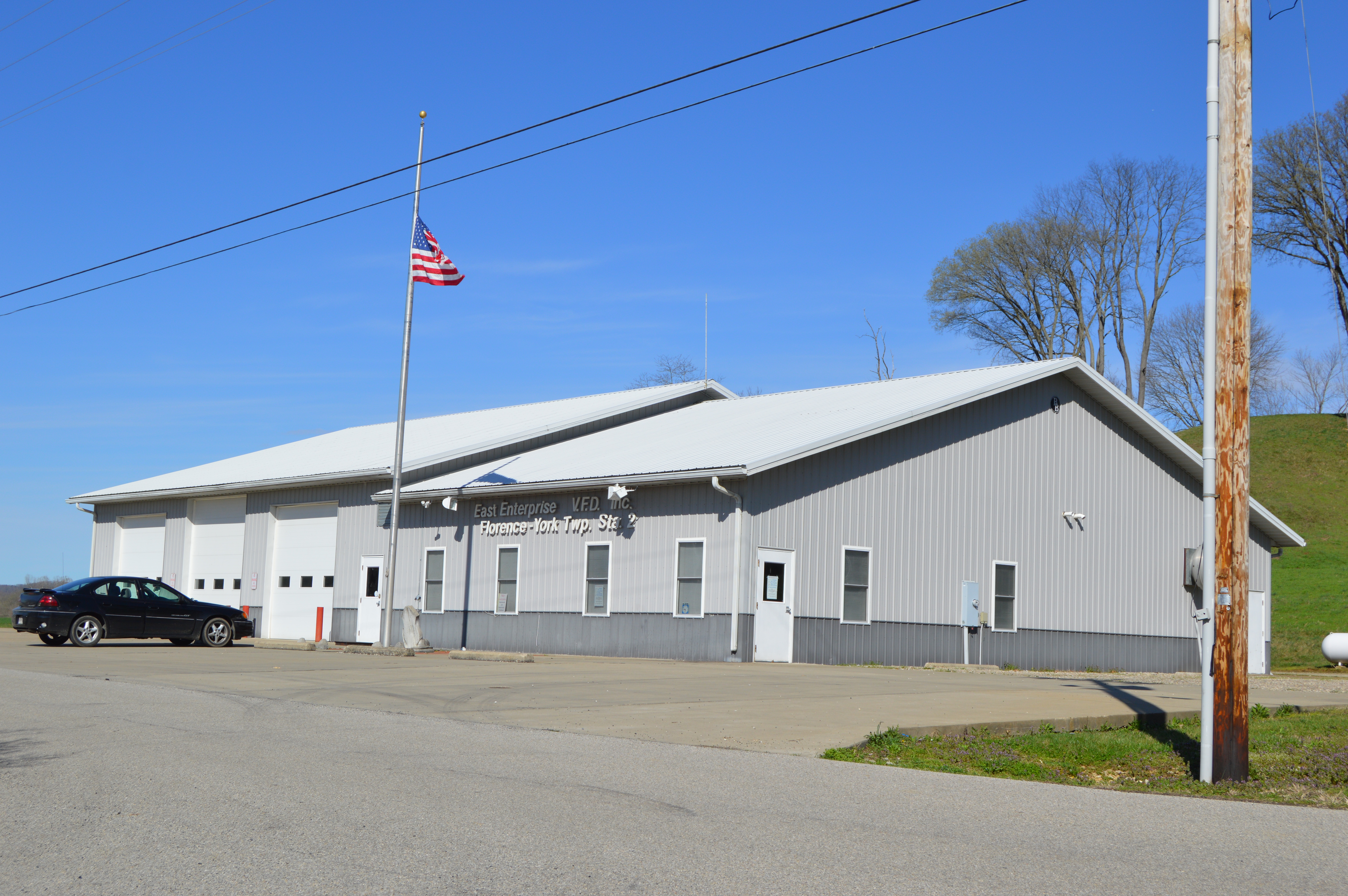
- Township fire department in Florence

- Location in Switzerland County
- Coordinates: 38°48′48″N 84°56′17″W
- Country: United States
- State: Indiana
- County: Switzerland

Government
  - Type: Indiana township

Area
  - Total: 24.23 sq mi (62.8 km^{2})
  - Land: 23.73 sq mi (61.5 km^{2})
  - Water: 0.5 sq mi (1.3 km^{2}) 2.06%
- Elevation: 482 ft (147 m)

Population (2020)
  - Total: 1,072
  - Density: 45.17/sq mi (17.44/km^{2})
- ZIP codes: 47020, 47038, 47043
- GNIS feature ID: 454071

York Township is one of six townships in Switzerland County, Indiana, United States. As of the 2020 census, its population was 1,072 and it contained 450 housing units.

Historical population
Census	Pop.	Note	%±
1890	1,605		—
1900	1,499		−6.6%
1910	1,275		−14.9%
1920	1,212		−4.9%
1930	978		−19.3%
1940	903		−7.7%
1950	763		−15.5%
1960	667		−12.6%
1970	623		−6.6%
1980	708		13.6%
1990	773		9.2%
2000	937		21.2%
2010	1,206		28.7%
2020	1,072		−11.1%
Source: US Decennial Census

== Geography ==
According to the 2010 census, the township has a total area of 24.23 square miles (62.8 km^{2}), of which 23.73 square miles (61.5 km^{2}) (or 97.94%) is land and 0.5 square miles (1.3 km^{2}) (or 2.06%) is water.

=== Unincorporated towns ===
- Florence at 38.78423°N 84.924393°W
- Markland at 38.782007°N 84.986616°W

(This list is based on USGS data and may include former settlements.)

=== Adjacent townships ===
- Posey Township (northeast)
- Jefferson Township (west)
- Cotton Township (northwest)

== School districts ==
- Switzerland County School Corporation

== Political districts ==
- Indiana's 6th congressional district
- State House District 68
- State Senate District 45
