= Florence, Indiana =

- Census-designated place
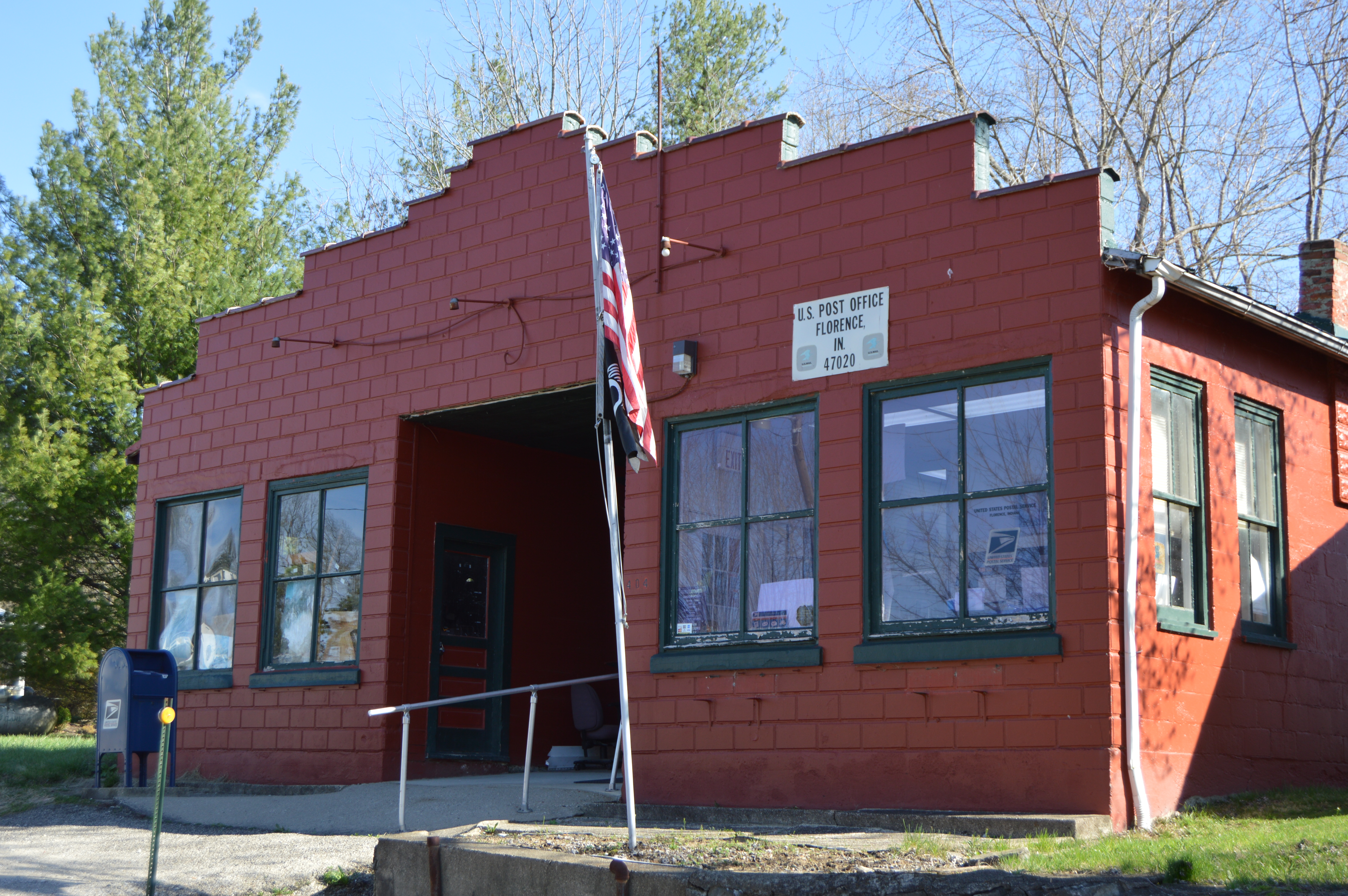
- The post office in Florence

- Location of Florence in Switzerland County, Indiana.
- Coordinates: 38°47′02″N 84°55′25″W
- Country: United States
- State: Indiana
- County: Switzerland
- Township: York

Area
  - Total: 0.15 sq mi (0.39 km^{2})
  - Land: 0.14 sq mi (0.35 km^{2})
  - Water: 0.015 sq mi (0.04 km^{2})
- Elevation: 466 ft (142 m)

Population (2020)
  - Total: 60
  - Density: 444.6/sq mi (171.68/km^{2})
- Time zone: UTC-5 (Eastern (EST))
  - Summer (DST): UTC-4 (EDT)
- ZIP code: 47020
- Area codes: 812, 930
- FIPS code: 18-23728
- GNIS feature ID: 2587018

Florence is an unincorporated census-designated place in York Township, Switzerland County, in the U.S. state of Indiana. As of the 2020 census, Florence had a population of 60.

== History ==
The community was laid out in 1817 under the name New York. A post office was established under this name in 1827, and was renamed to Florence in 1847. The post office is still currently operating.

== Geography ==
=== Climate ===
The climate in this area is characterized by hot, humid summers and generally mild to cool winters. According to the Köppen Climate Classification system, Florence has a humid subtropical climate, abbreviated "Cfa" on climate maps.

== Demographics ==
Historical population
Census	Pop.	Note	%±
2020	60		—
U.S. Decennial Census

== See also ==
- List of cities and towns along the Ohio River
