= Warsaw, Kentucky =

- City
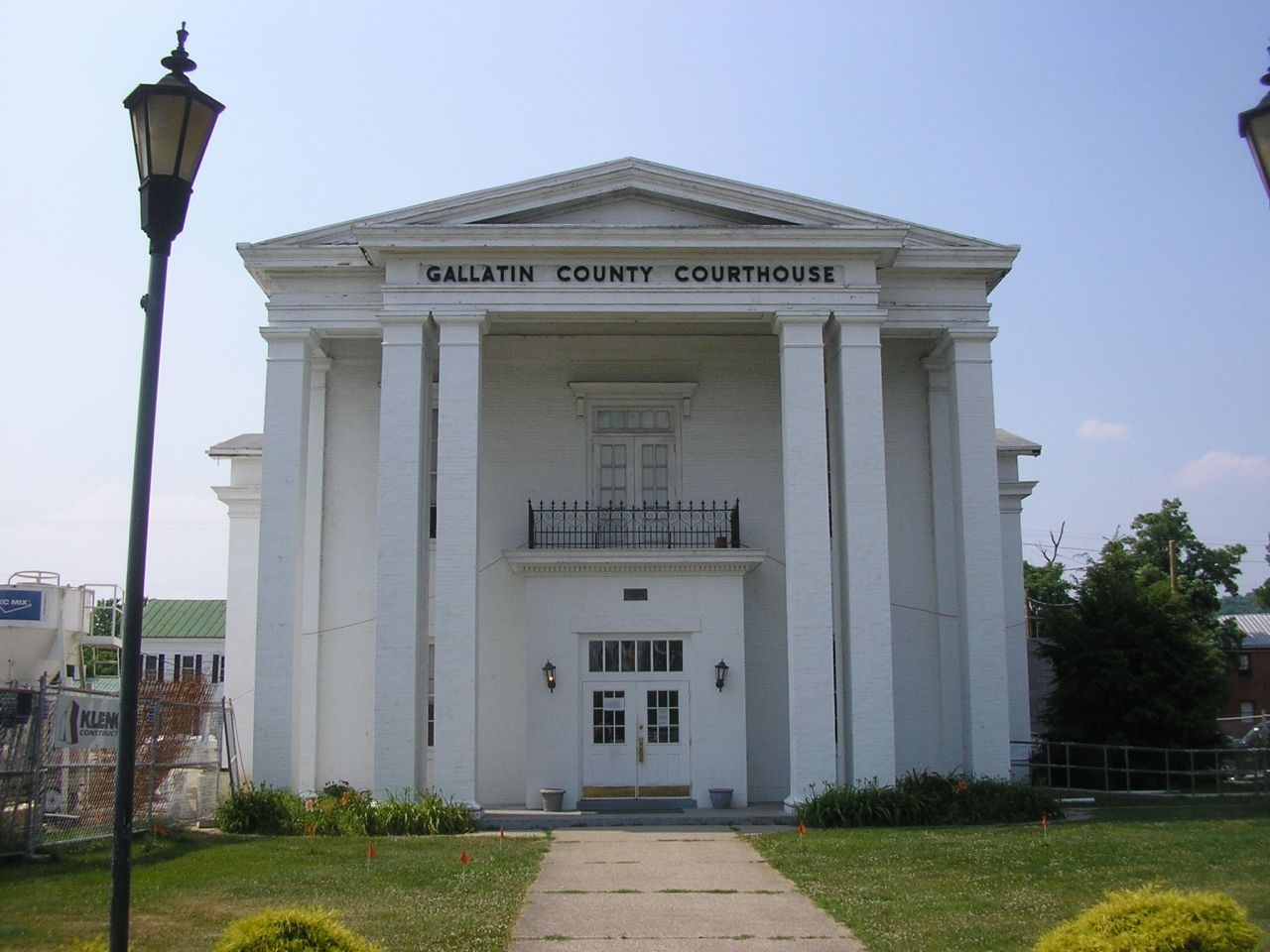
- Gallatin County Courthouse

- Location of Warsaw in Gallatin County, Kentucky.
- Coordinates: 38°46′04″N 84°54′46″W
- Country: United States
- State: Kentucky
- County: Gallatin

Area
  - Total: 1.03 sq mi (2.66 km^{2})
  - Land: 0.96 sq mi (2.49 km^{2})
  - Water: 0.066 sq mi (0.17 km^{2})
- Elevation: 492 ft (150 m)

Population (2020)
  - Total: 1,761
  - Estimate (2022): 1,756
  - Density: 1,831.0/sq mi (706.97/km^{2})
- Time zone: UTC-5 (Eastern (EST))
  - Summer (DST): UTC-4 (EDT)
- ZIP code: 41095
- Area code: 859
- FIPS code: 21-80706
- GNIS feature ID: 2405677
- Website: www.cityofwarsawky.org

Warsaw is a home rule-class city in and the county seat of Gallatin County, Kentucky, United States, located along the Ohio River. The name was suggested by a riverboat captain, who was reading Thaddeus of Warsaw, by Jane Porter, when the city was being founded.

As of the 2020 census, Warsaw had a population of 1,761.

== History ==
Warsaw began as a landing on the Ohio River in 1798 called "Great Landing". In 1805, founder Colonel Robert Johnson surveyed and built a road from this landing to his former home in Scott County, Kentucky. The landing soon became a busy shipping port.

In 1814, Colonel Johnson and Henry Yates purchased 200 acres (81 ha) to establish a river town to be named "Fredericksburg", after Johnson's hometown in Virginia. By 1815, the town plot was complete. The town extended from the river to Market Street and included 172 numbered lots, each 28.5 by 99 feet (8.7 by 30.2 m).

In 1831, the town was renamed as "Warsaw", as the US Postal Service did not want it to have the same name as the Virginia city. The post office was established July 18, 1832, with W.F. Clinton as postmaster. In 1837, the Gallatin County seat was moved from Port William (now Carrollton) to Warsaw. The courthouse is now the oldest operating one in the state. The oldest home in Warsaw is the Henry Yates House, a home built of log construction circa 1809.

On December 4, 1868, 80 people died in the Ohio River steamboat collision of the United States and the America near Warsaw.

The Warsaw Historic District was listed on the National Register of Historic Places in 1982. It is roughly bounded by W. High, E. Franklin, Washington, Market, Main, 3rd, 4th and Cross streets. It features Italianate and Gothic Revival architecture.

== Geography ==
Warsaw is located in north-central Gallatin County, along the south bank of the Ohio River. Across the river is the unincorporated community of Florence, Indiana; the closest river crossing is the Markland Dam Bridge, 3.5 miles (5.6 km) to the west (downstream). U.S. Route 42 passes through the center of town, leading northeast 35 miles (56 km) to Covington and southwest along the Ohio River 17 miles (27 km) to Carrollton. Kentucky Route 35 leads south from Warsaw 6 miles (10 km) to Interstate 71 and the Kentucky Speedway in Sparta.

According to the United States Census Bureau, Warsaw has a total area of 0.69 square miles (1.8 km^{2}), of which 0.66 square miles (1.7 km^{2}) is land and 0.04 square miles (0.1 km^{2}), or 6.47%, is water.

== Demographics ==
Historical population
Census	Pop.	Note	%±
1860	658		—
1870	715		8.7%
1880	666		−6.9%
1890	676		1.5%
1900	785		16.1%
1910	900		14.6%
1920	800		−11.1%
1930	800		0.0%
1940	880		10.0%
1950	829		−5.8%
1960	981		18.3%
1970	1,232		25.6%
1980	1,328		7.8%
1990	1,202		−9.5%
2000	1,811		50.7%
2010	1,615		−10.8%
2020	1,761		9.0%
2022 (est.)	1,756		−0.3%
U.S. Decennial Census

=== 2020 census ===
As of the 2020 census, Warsaw had a population of 1,761. The median age was 39.8 years. 24.4% of residents were under the age of 18 and 20.1% of residents were 65 years of age or older. For every 100 females there were 88.5 males, and for every 100 females age 18 and over there were 86.2 males age 18 and over.

0.0% of residents lived in urban areas, while 100.0% lived in rural areas.

There were 692 households in Warsaw, of which 32.8% had children under the age of 18 living in them. Of all households, 34.7% were married-couple households, 19.2% were households with a male householder and no spouse or partner present, and 34.8% were households with a female householder and no spouse or partner present. About 35.4% of all households were made up of individuals and 14.6% had someone living alone who was 65 years of age or older.

There were 790 housing units, of which 12.4% were vacant. The homeowner vacancy rate was 5.0% and the rental vacancy rate was 8.6%.

Racial composition as of the 2020 census
Race	Number	Percent
White	1,490	84.6%
Black or African American	44	2.5%
American Indian and Alaska Native	5	0.3%
Asian	8	0.5%
Native Hawaiian and Other Pacific Islander	2	0.1%
Some other race	74	4.2%
Two or more races	138	7.8%
Hispanic or Latino (of any race)	165	9.4%

=== 2000 census ===
As of the census of 2000, there were 1,811 people, 737 households, and 451 families residing in the city. The population density was 1,868.3 inhabitants per square mile (721.4/km^{2}). There were 830 housing units at an average density of 856.3 per square mile (330.6/km^{2}). The racial makeup of the city was 92.88% white, 4.86% African American, 0.11% Native American, 0.50% Asian, 0.39% from other races, and 1.27% from two or more races. Hispanic or Latino of any race were 1.27% of the population.

There were 737 households, out of which 30.8% had children under the age of 18 living with them, 40.2% were married couples living together, 14.9% had a female householder with no husband present, and 38.7% were non-families. 33.6% of all households were made up of individuals, and 16.6% had someone living alone who was 65 years of age or older. The average household size was 2.31 and the average family size was 2.93.

In the city, the population was spread out, with 25.1% under the age of 18, 8.4% from 18 to 24, 27.8% from 25 to 44, 19.4% from 45 to 64, and 19.3% who were 65 years of age or older. The median age was 37 years. For every 100 females, there were 92.0 males. For every 100 females age 18 and over, there were 84.0 males.

The median income for a household in the city was $25,179, and the median income for a family was $31,250. Males had a median income of $30,174 versus $18,164 for females. The per capita income for the city was $15,340. About 16.8% of families and 20.3% of the population were below the poverty line, including 23.7% of those under age 18 and 16.6% of those age 65 or over.

== Education ==
Public education in Warsaw is administered by Gallatin County Schools, which operates Gallatin County High School.

Warsaw has a lending library, the Gallatin County Public Library.

== Notable people ==
- Eva Craig Graves Doughty, journalist.
- Lucy Montz was the first woman in Kentucky to practice dentistry.
- Carlotta Thompkins was born in 1844 in Warsaw. She later became one of the most well-known gamblers in the Old West.
- Richard Yates (1815–1873), served as the 13th Governor of Illinois during the American Civil War from 1861 to 1865.

== See also ==
- List of cities and towns along the Ohio River
- Lynchings of Benjamin and Mollie French
