= Markland Locks and Dam =

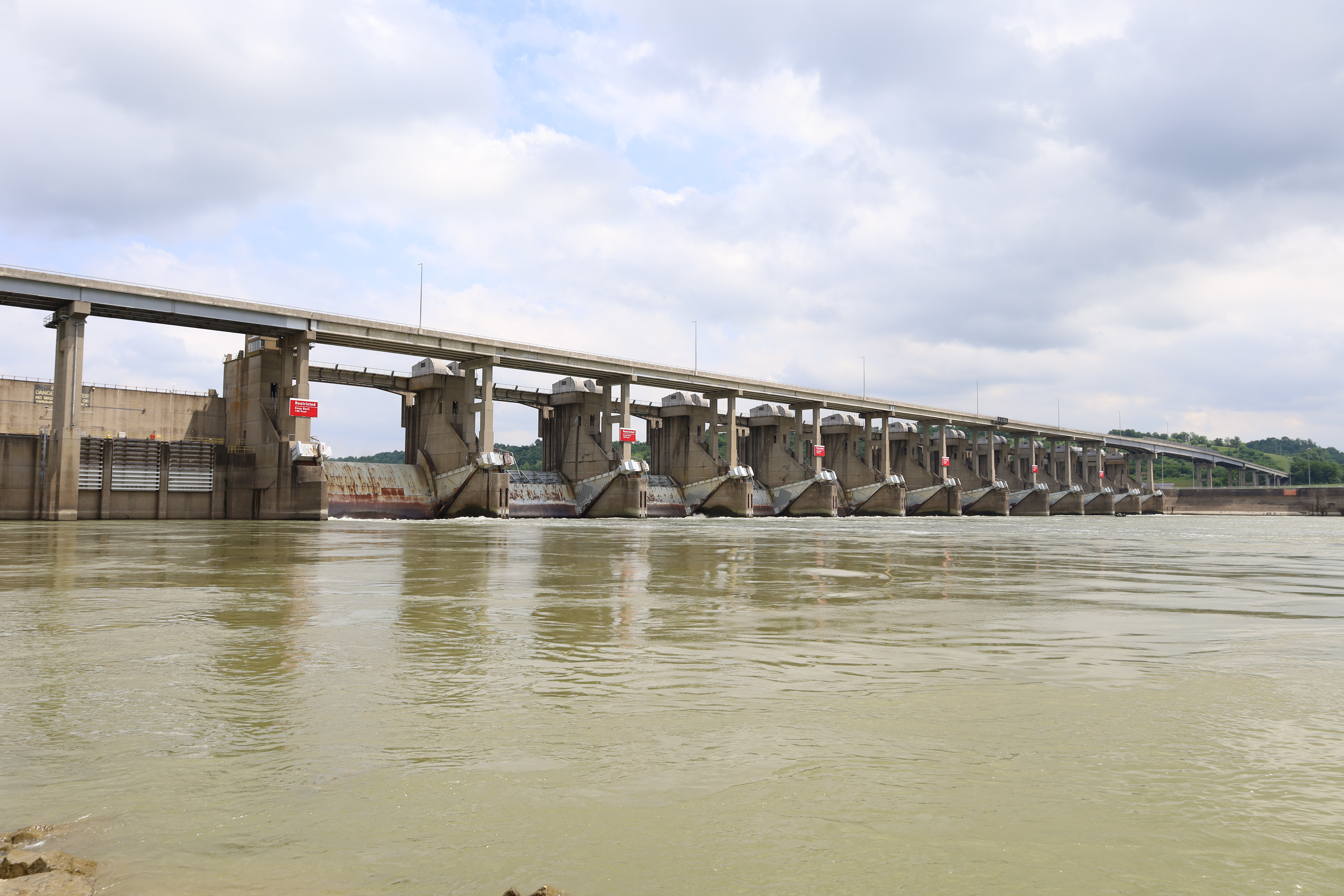
- Markland Locks and Dam in 2024
- Interactive map of Markland Locks and Dam
- Location: Gallatin County, Kentucky / York Township, Switzerland County, Indiana, United States
- Coordinates: 38°46′29″N 84°57′51″W
- Construction began: March 1956
- Opening date: June 1964
- Operators: United States Army Corps of Engineers Louisville District, Duke Energy Indiana

Dam and spillways
- Impounds: Ohio River
- Length: 1395 ft (425.2 m)

Power Station
- Operator: Duke Energy
- Installed capacity: 81 Mva

The Markland Locks and Dam is a concrete dam bridge and locks that span the Ohio River. The dam is 1,395 feet (425.2 m) long, and connects Gallatin County, Kentucky, and Switzerland County, Indiana.

The locks and dam were reviewed by the Board of Engineers for River and Harbours to replace the Ohio River locks and dams numbers 35, 36, 37, 38 and 39. The project was approved by the Secretary of the Army on March 11, 1953. Construction on the locks began in March 1956 and they were placed in operation in May 1959. Dam construction began in April 1959 and was finished in June 1964.

The Federal Power Commission granted a license for Cinergy to operate a hydroelectric power plant at the dam. Cinergy was later bought by Duke Energy. The plant has a capacity of 81,000 kilovolt-amperes.

On September 27, 2009, the lower miter gate failed on the 1,200-foot (370 m) lock due to a solenoid malfunction. The lock chamber remained closed for 155 days, but the 600-foot (180 m) lock continued to lock traffic, albeit with delays. The 1,200-foot lock was repaired and reopened on March 1, 2010.

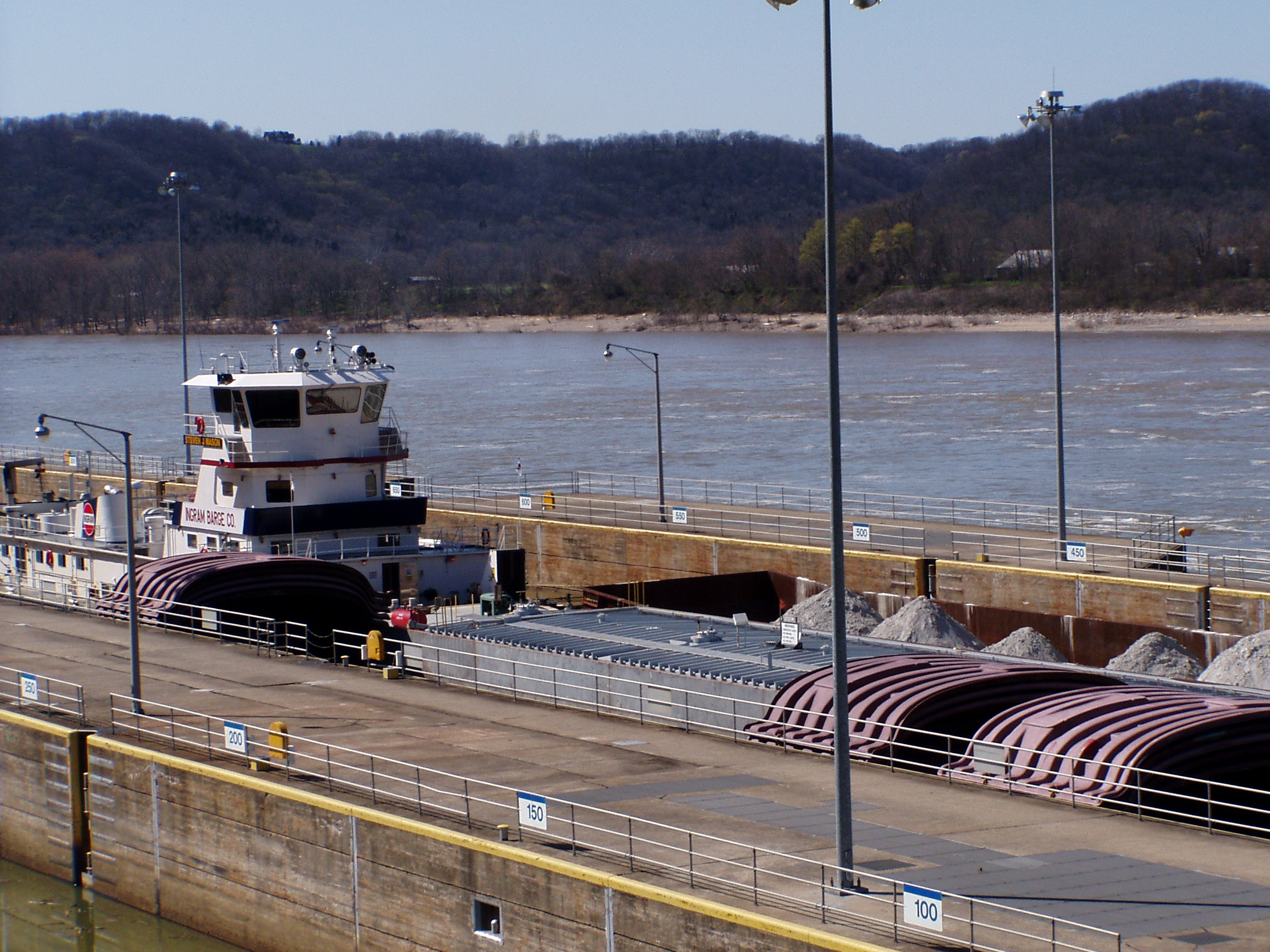
The Steven J. Mason (Ingram Barge Co.) locking through

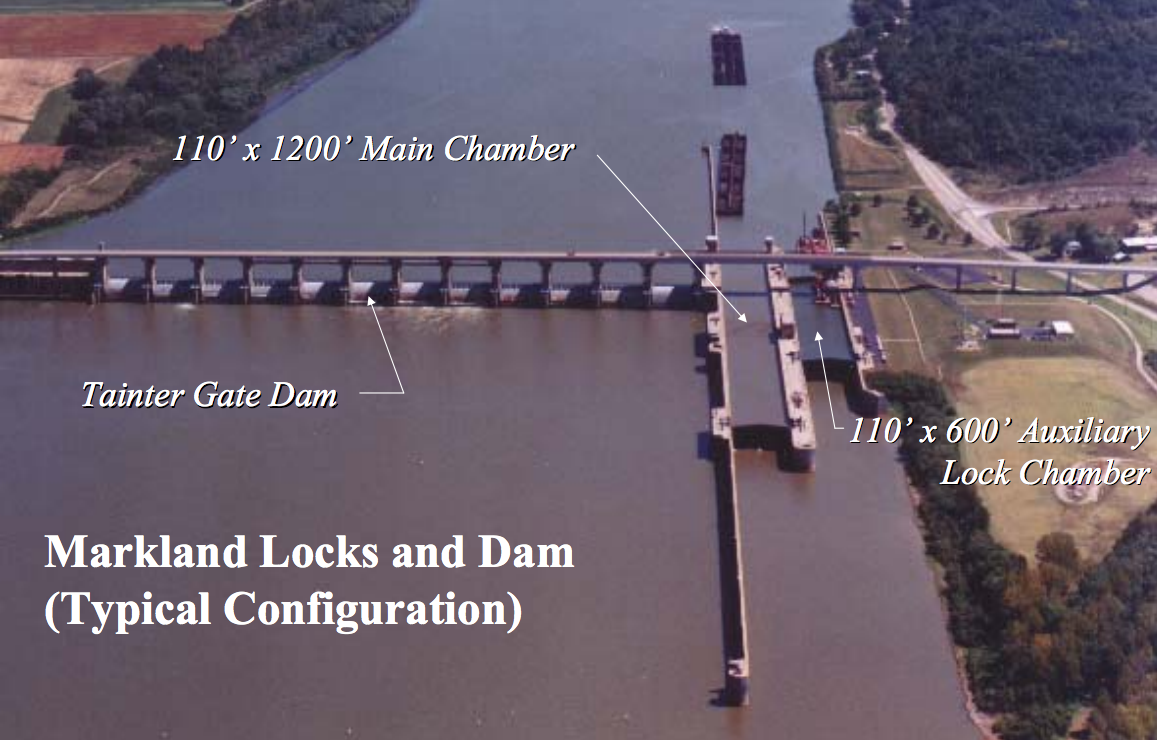
Markland Lock and dam aerial

== See also ==
- List of crossings of the Ohio River
- List of locks and dams of the Ohio River
