= List of properties in Hartford City Courthouse Square Historic District =

This is a list of properties contained within the boundaries of the federal government designated Hartford City Courthouse Square Historic District in Hartford City, Indiana, United States. The District was added to the National Register of Historic Places on June 21, 2006. Over 40 contributing properties, including two buildings that are also in the National Register for their own significance, are included in the list.

Most information was retrieved from two major sources: Historic Landmarks Foundation of Indiana's Blackford County Interim Report (Interim Report) and the National Register of Historic Places Nomination form for the Hartford City Courthouse Square District (National Register). The National Register was the final source to decide which properties contribute to the historic district. There are some instances where the sources disagree. For example, the Interim Report listed all of the monuments on the courthouse lawn as contributing properties, while National Register listed only the World War I monument. Any additional sources, which were used exclusively in the notes column with one exception, are footnoted.

The list contains information on each property, including its common name. If the building doesn't have a common name that can be attributed to a reliable source, then it is described simply as a "Commercial Building". The address is listed for each structure because it provides a general reference point to navigate the properties of the historic district. Some addresses may change slightly over time as storefronts are altered. Where the two major sources disagree on a street address, the current address of the building was used. Four of the categories of information can be sorted. The list's default sort orders the properties alphabetically by street, and then north-to-south or east-to-west. Linked information on each building's major architectural themes is also listed where available. Images and brief notes, where available, are listed in the last section.

== Contributing properties ==
These properties are contributing properties to the Hartford City Courthouse Square Historic District. In general this means that they add to the historic character of the historic district. In the case of this historic district, the property is associated with architecture, commerce, politics, government, or social history.

	Property name	Address	Built	Architecture	Image	Notes
1	Blackford County Courthouse	Courthouse Square	1894	Romanesque Revival Richardsonian Romanesque		Focal point of town. Outstanding historic or architectural significance. Outstanding example of Richardsonian Romanesque architecture. Listed in National Register of Historic Places.
2	World War I Memorial	Courthouse Square	1921	Sculpture		Twenty foot high bronze sculpture created by Ernest Moore Viquesney and known as the Spirit of the American Doughboy. Unveiled September 28, 1921.
3	First Presbyterian Church	220 N. High St.	1893	Romanesque Revival Richardsonian Romanesque		Also uses 117 W. Franklin Street as address. Oldest church building in town. Outstanding example of Richardsonian Romanesque architecture. Listed in National Register of Historic Places. Outstanding stained glass windows and history with city's glass industry.
4	Commercial Building	211 N. High St.	circa 1910			Two-part commercial block listed as 213-215 N. High in National Register, current address for building is 211 N. High, Interim Report lists as 211 N. High. Taller building with mini-van parked in front in photo. Peoples Gas and Oil Company had an office at the 213 North High Street address in 1903.
5	Commercial Building	209 N. High St.	circa 1910			Smaller building to right of white building in left half of photo.
6	Commercial Building	111 N. High St.	circa 1900	Italianate		Listed as 109 N. High in National Register. Building has been torn down.
7	Commercial Building	114 S. High St.	circa 1900			Listed as 118 S. High Street in National Register.
8	Commercial Building	116-120 S. High St.	circa 1900			The Model Steam Laundry operated at the 120 address during the early 1900s.
9	United States Post Office	123 S. High St.	1934	Neoclassical		Outstanding historic or architectural significance. Federal Public Works Number 207 constructed during the Great Depression as a project of the Public Works Administration.
10	Commercial Building	124 S. High St.	circa 1890			National Register identifies this as contributing, while Interim Report says non-contributing. Around 1911, agricultural implements, buggies, and carriages were sold from this address.
11	Cox Building	217 N. Jefferson St.	circa 1915	Craftsman		Original version of building built c. 1895. Photo shows building in 2010. Housed E.E. Cox's newspaper and printing business. Torn down April 26, 2016.
12	Hotel Ingram	118-122 N. Jefferson St.	circa 1900	Romanesque Revival		Notable historic or architectural significance. Hotel had fine dining and the Ingram Bar. Later became known as the Hartford Hotel, and was the home of George Stevens, one of the city's leading citizens and philanthropists.
13	Commercial Building	114-116 N. Jefferson St.	circa 1899	Romanesque Revival		Home Restaurant occupied 114 N. Jefferson, and Abbott & Saxon (saloon) occupied 116 N. Jefferson in the early 1900s.
14	Commercial Building	108-110 N. Jefferson St.	circa 1900			
15	Former Bank Block Building	102-104 N. Jefferson St.	circa 1889			Originally northern part of Bank Block. Southern building (which retains original features) on corner at right of 2010 photo, while Northern building (which has had original features removed) on left. Commercial Italianate features removed by the 1960s.
16	Bank Block	100 N. Jefferson St.	circa 1889	Italianate		Southern portion of original Bank Block. Building is on corner of street, right side of photo taken in 2010. Southern portion retains most of original features.
17	Blackford County Jail	120 E. Main St.	1879	Italianate		Oldest contributing building in district. Outstanding historic or architectural significance.
18	Weiler's Building	104 W. Main St.	1896	Romanesque Revival		Once one of the largest department stores in Indiana.
19	Rosenbush Building	110 W. Main St.	circa 1890	Renaissance Revival		Notable historic or architectural significance. Rosenbush was a tailer that worked at this site during the early 1900s.
20	Patterson Building	112 W. Main St.	1896	Romanesque Revival		Listed in Interim Report simply as "Commercial Building", this building was built by S. R. Patterson. Plans for the building were discussed in 1892, as demand for office space was strong at that time. In 1895, architects were submitting plans for the building, and it was thought that Blackford County Bank would occupy the front of the first floor. W. J. Fulton dry goods and notions sold at this location in the early 1900s.
21	Sage Building	114-116 W. Main St.	1894 or 1895			Building is in center of photo. 1890s office of Dr. John W. Sage, popular physician and Civil War veteran. Sage built on the site of his office and home. The building was near completion by January 1895, and it included twelve office rooms. In the early 1900s, the Mecca saloon was located at this address.
22	W.H. Gable Block	118-122 W. Main St.	1891	Italianate		William H. Gable eventually built on land that was his first real estate investment after two years of participation in the California Gold Rush.
23	Sowers & Gough Drugstore	200 W. Main St.	1940	Art Deco		Originally built c. 1910. Cecil R. Gough ran this drugstore and popular gathering place during the 1930s and 1940s. The store had a soda fountain and seating. It was later run by Merit Tams and then Pat Mehling.
24	Knights of Pythias / Tyner Building	204-210 W. Main St.	1900	Queen Anne		Has mixture of architectural features including Romanesque, Classical, and Renaissance Revival in addition to Queen Anne. Notable historic or architectural significance. The Hartford City Times operated from the 210 W. Main address during the early 1900s. For a brief "turbulent" period during the 1920s, the Ku Klux Klan had an office in this building.
25	Commercial Building	214 W. Main St.	circa 1890			Schisler shoemaker and repair operated here in the early 1900s. Also home office of Byron Snell, a salesman for Mail Pouch Tobacco. Snell married a Schisler, and the B. Snell & Son business was still thriving in Hartford City in the 1980s.
26	Commercial Building	220 W. Main St.	circa 1910			Identified as 218 W. Main in National Register, current address is 220 W. Main and Interim Report identifies as 220 W. Main.
27	Commercial Building	210 E. Washington St.	circa 1940	Art Moderne		Notable historic or architectural significance. Rare (in Hartford City) example of Art Moderne style of architecture.
28	E. Smilack Building	203 E. Washington St.	circa 1910	Craftsman		Elbert Smilack was an immigrant from Russia that prospered in the United States, and owned numerous oil wells. Smilack was also involved in coal, wood, second-hand pipe, old oil wells, and scrap metal.
29	Commercial Building	201 E. Washington St.	circa 1950			
30	Commercial Building	200 E. Washington St.	circa 1920			
31	Commercial Building	125 E. Washington St.	circa 1950			Interim Report describes this building as non-contributing, while National Register map shows as contributing.
32	Scheidler Theater	118 E. Washington St.	1947	Art Deco		Notable historic or architectural significance. "Very elegant and beautifully decorated" theater built by Matt Scheidler.
33	Commercial Building	110 E. Washington St.	circa 1900	Italianate		Building collapsed during March 2023
34	Griffin Building	108 E. Washington St.	circa 1900			Second of side-by-side Griffin buildings. Located on left in photo. Home of Russell Lewis saloon in the early 1900s.
35	Griffin Building	106 E. Washington St.	circa 1890	Renaissance Revival		Located on right in photo. Described in National Register as "built with Romanesque Revival details", but has no arches (see photo). Interim Report describes as Renaissance Revival.
36	Dowell Building	107-109 W. Washington St.	1893	Italianate		Frank P. Dowell maintained an office in rooms 5 and 6 in this building (which looks like two buildings), making loans and insuring property. Frank's father, Jessie H. Dowell, was founder and president of Hartford City Natural Gas and Oil Company.
37	Briscoe Building	113-119 W. Washington St.	1893	Renaissance Revival		Described in National Register as "Romanesque Revival", but has no arches (see photo). Interim Report describes as Renaissance Revival. Longtime home of Hoover-Needler Furniture (known as J.L. Hoover at beginning of 20th century. Also home of Kentucky Liquor Company and Western Union in the early 1900s.
38	Kirshbaum Building	123 W. Washington St.	1893	Romanesque Revival		Outstanding historic or architectural significance. Originally housed the First National Bank.
39	Ervin Building	201-205 W. Washington St.	circa 1890	Queen Anne		Outstanding historic or architectural significance. Originally housed Campbell & Ervin Dry Goods.
40	Commercial Building	208-210 W. Washington St.	circa 1890			Two-part commercial block. This building has been torn down. Identified as 216 W. Washington Street in Interim Report. Hartford City Natural Gas and Oil Company had an office at the 210 West Washington Street address in 1903.
41	Campbell Building	207-211 W. Washington St.	1901	Renaissance Revival		Outstanding historic or architectural significance. Office building housed insurance agents, a dentist, and a physician in the early 1900s.
42	Smith Building	213 W. Washington St.	circa 1890	Renaissance Revival		Office building during the early 1900s that housed attorneys and a dentist.
43	Commercial Building	219 W. Washington St.	circa 1890	Italianate		O. R. Cantwell had one of the city's four pool and billiards parlors at this address in 1902.
