= First Presbyterian Church (Hartford City, Indiana) =

Historic church in Indiana, United States

- U.S. National Register of Historic Places
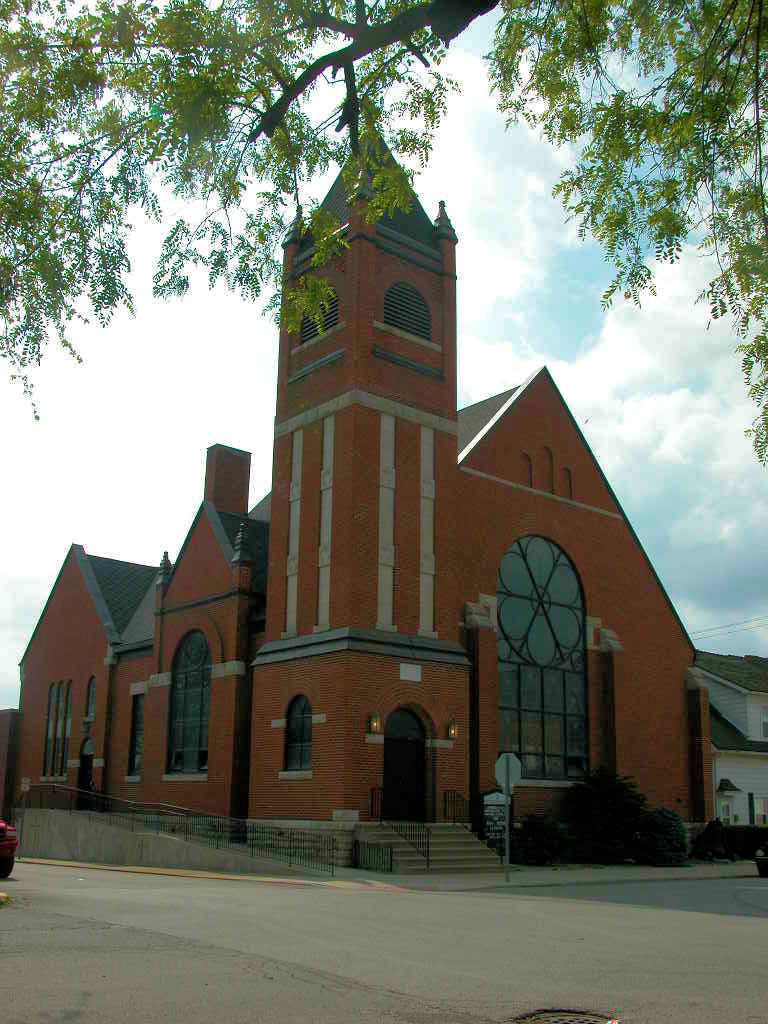
- Hartford City's First Presbyterian Church in 2010

- Location within Blackford County, Indiana Location within Indiana Location within the United States
- Location: Hartford City, Indiana
- Coordinates: 40°27′10″N 85°22′6″W
- Built: 1893
- Architect: Alec Gable
- Architectural style: Romanesque
- NRHP reference No.: 86001263
- Added to NRHP: June 13, 1986

The First Presbyterian Church of Hartford City is a Presbyterian church in Hartford City, Indiana, United States. The edifice is the oldest church building in a small city that at one time was a bustling community with as many as ten glass factories – and over 20 saloons. Located at the corner of High and Franklin Streets, the church is part of the Hartford City Courthouse Square Historic District. The church was added to the National Register of Historic Places in 1986.

Construction of the house of worship began in 1892 and was completed in 1893. The church building is considered one of the city's best examples of the Richardsonian Romanesque style of architecture. One aspect of the building that makes it particularly notable is its windows. The church features massive stained glass windows that were hand-crafted in Belgium and assembled by local glass workers originally from that country.

At the time the church was constructed, the region was undergoing substantial economic growth related to the discovery of natural gas, and this period is known as the Indiana Gas Boom. Most of the city's distinctive buildings within its Courthouse Square Historic District were built during that period, including both buildings listed in the National Register of Historic Places—the Blackford County Courthouse and the First Presbyterian Church.

== Presbyterians in Hartford City ==
In the 1840s, the community that would eventually be named Hartford City was still named Hartford. Methodists had been holding Christian religious services in the area since the 1830s. A second branch of Christianity came to the area on December 18, 1843, when the Presbyterian Church of Hartford was founded by a group of thirteen people and the Reverend Samuel N. Steel. The community's original Presbyterian church building was built on the southeast edge of the village in 1844, and was located on Mulberry Street, between Water and Washington Streets. Hartford was a small, unincorporated farming community at that time, and farm land was only two blocks away from the church. The church was renamed Blackford Presbyterian Church in 1853. That name was short-lived, as the church became known as the Presbyterian Church of Hartford (again) in 1855.

Today, the church's original Mulberry Street location is about two blocks from the current courthouse square of the city of Hartford City. Hartford was renamed Hartford City in the 1850s when it was discovered that a community named Hartford already existed in Indiana. The renamed community grew enough to incorporate as a town in 1857. The Presbyterian congregation was also growing, although the church had yet to keep the same minister for more than three years. Members of the church's congregation included “some of the county's most respected citizens”, with surnames such as Willman, Gable, Reasoner, Fulton, Emshwiller, Woolard, Sanderson, and McEldowney. (The area's first settler was Benjamin Reasoner).

As the house of worship became more crowded, the ladies of the congregation began a fund for a new church. On March 7, 1868, the Presbyterians purchased a lot on the north side of Hartford City at the corner of High and Franklin Streets, not far from the location of a Methodist church used in the 1840s. The lot cost $150. A new wood-frame Presbyterian Church was quickly constructed. Labor for construction was donated by the church members and friends. The new church was larger and better-furnished than the previous church, and was heated with two stoves. However, within the next two decades, overcrowding again became a problem. Members of the congregation were unwilling to go deep into debt for a new structure, but they began to work to acquire the financial resources necessary to achieve their goal of a larger house of worship.

The women of the church's congregation again played a major role in fundraising for a new church building, with various projects and clubs. Among the fundraising groups were the Sewing Circle, the Reading Circle, and the Aftermath Society. In 1883, an additional group was established with the extensive name of "The Woman's Home and Foreign Missionary Society of Hartford City, Muncie Presbytery, Auxiliary to the Northwest Branches of the Presbyterian Church." That organization, which started with 6 members, had as many as 80 members and guests at meetings within the year. Putting 80 people in perspective, the whole town had a population of just 1,470 in 1880.

== Construction ==
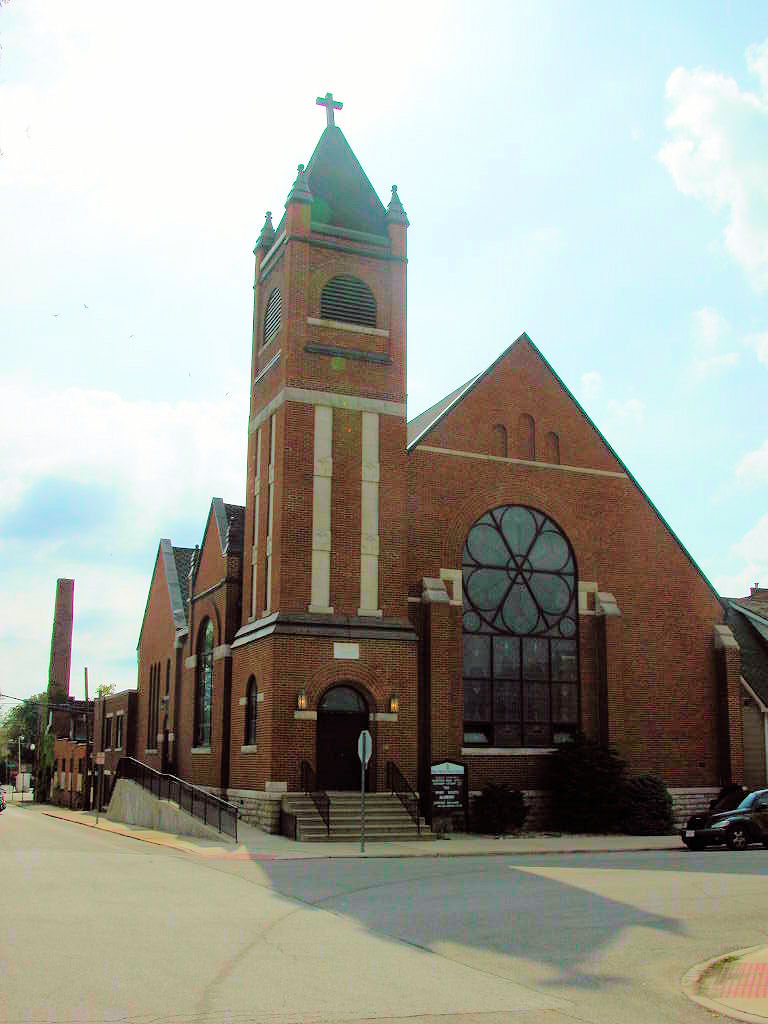
West side (High Street) of Hartford City's First Presbyterian Church in 2010

In 1890, Reverend A. Judson Arrick was installed as the new pastor of Hartford City's Presbyterian Church. At his urging, members worked even harder to raise funds for a new church building. Eventually, plans for the new building were submitted, and a contract was awarded to Alec Gable for the construction of a new brick building. In 1892, the wood-frame Presbyterian Church was moved one block east to Jefferson Street, enabling construction of a new house of worship to begin on the Franklin and High Street site. The cornerstone for the new building was laid during the same year, as construction began. Unfortunately, Reverend Arrick preached his last sermon in Hartford City on September 6, 1892, and was unable to see the completed church. In December, the roof was completed and floor laid, and church members held their first service in the partially completed structure on January 8, 1893. Reverend J. W. Fulton was the new pastor.

By July 1893, the new church building was completed. The well-attended Sunday dedication ceremony (July 9, 1893) included the Reverend Charles H. Payne, a noted New York divine, in addition to visitors from nearby cities and towns. At the crowded dedication, it was announced that $5,000 would be needed to pay off all debt on the building. A total of $4,809 in donations was pledged at that time. Later that evening, additional funds were donated, and the grand total for the day was $5,529. Among the donors were five individuals that pledged $300 each, plus one group (Aftermath Society) also pledged $300. Thus, the church was free of debt. The building was considered expensive for the time, costing over $10,000. However, the congregation's years of planning and generosity were rewarded with a debt-free structure that was considered a grand achievement. The church had two main rooms: the sanctuary on the west side of the building, and an east-side lecture room.

The old wood-frame church was not abandoned. It was rented for a few years and used for storage. Sometime prior to 1895, it was deconstructed again – and moved to the south side of town. The wood-frame building served as the location for a mission Sunday School, and attendance averaged 30 to 40 students each Sunday.

=== Architecture ===
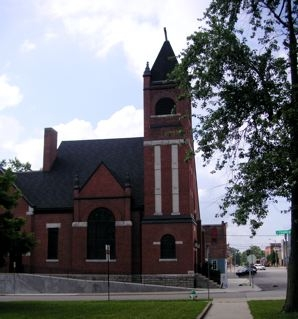
North side (Franklin Street) of Hartford City's First Presbyterian Church in 2006

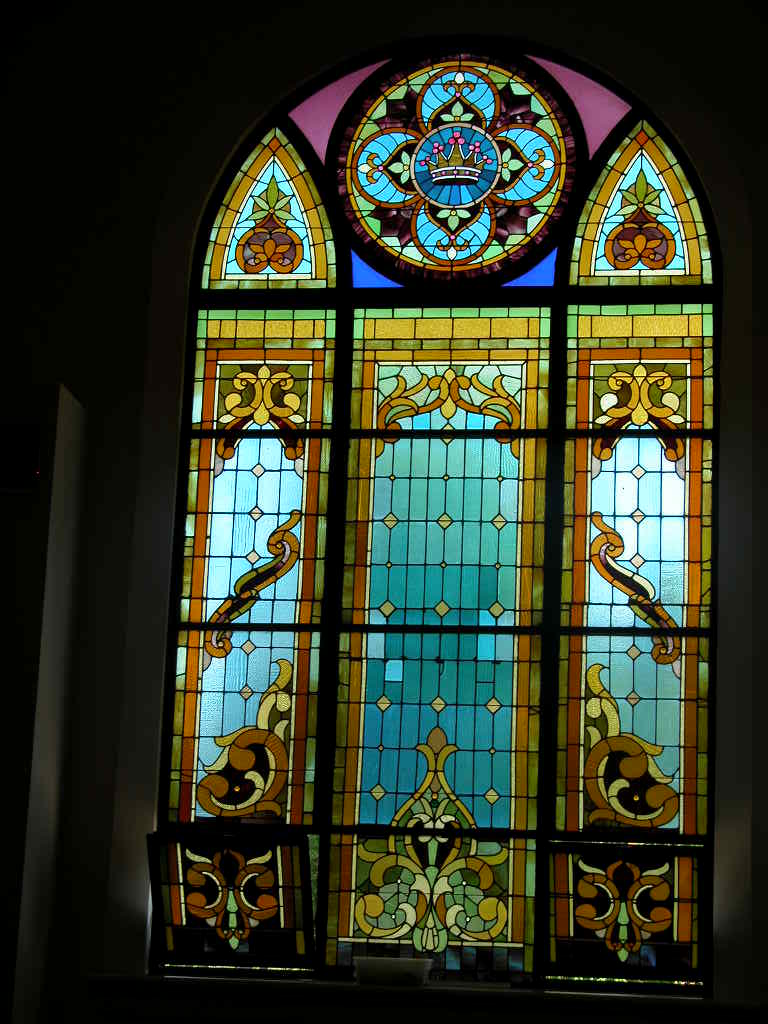
Large stained glass window on Franklin Street side

The citizens of the community were duly impressed with the new church. One of the local newspapers said "The edifice is one that does a credit to the city as well as the congregation...a monument of which they may be justly proud." The church building is considered Hartford City's best example of a form of the Romanesque Revival architectural style known as Richardsonian Romanesque. H. H. Richardson's interpretation of the Romanesque architectural style became popular in America in the late 19th century, especially for churches and public buildings. Typical of his style was a large single tower, round arches above windows and doors, groups of windows, gabled roofs, and contrasting color or texture in exterior stone and brick masonry.

Alec Gable, the architect that designed Hartford City's First Presbyterian Church, incorporated many of these typical Richardson features in the church's blueprint. The building's exterior is brick trimmed with limestone – a mixing of exterior textures typical of the Richardsonian Romanesque architectural style. Indiana is famous for its limestone, which has been used in monuments, universities, and government buildings found throughout the United States. The church's main façade is gabled with a round-arched doorway and a large stained-glass window. A square bell tower, located on the northwest corner, divides the north and west sides of the building. The top of the tower is steep-pitched, pyramid-shaped, and crowned with a Christian cross. These are more characteristics typical of Richardson's designs. The corners of the tower form piers that rise above the base of the roof, and each pier has a circular cap that slopes to a ball-tipped point.

The west side of the structure (see photo herein), which houses the main (High Street) entrance to the sanctuary (located at the base of the bell tower), features an enormous stained glass window surrounded with narrow brick buttresses topped with limestone. Additional buttresses, similar in appearance but slightly lower in height, are located on both sides of the southwest corner of the building. The circular window, known as a rose window, is similar to the style of the circular windows found in European cathedrals. The Cathedral Basilica of St Denis and the Chartres Cathedral are examples of the rose window in Europe.

The original north (Franklin Street) side of the building (see photo herein) has two gabled sections. The section located next to the bell tower contains a large stained glass window exceeded in size only by the enormous window on the west side. Both of the large (west side and north side) windows are visible from inside the church's sanctuary. Another gabled section on the north side, further to the east from the tower, is the location for the Franklin Street entrance to the building – and more stained glass windows.

=== Stained glass ===
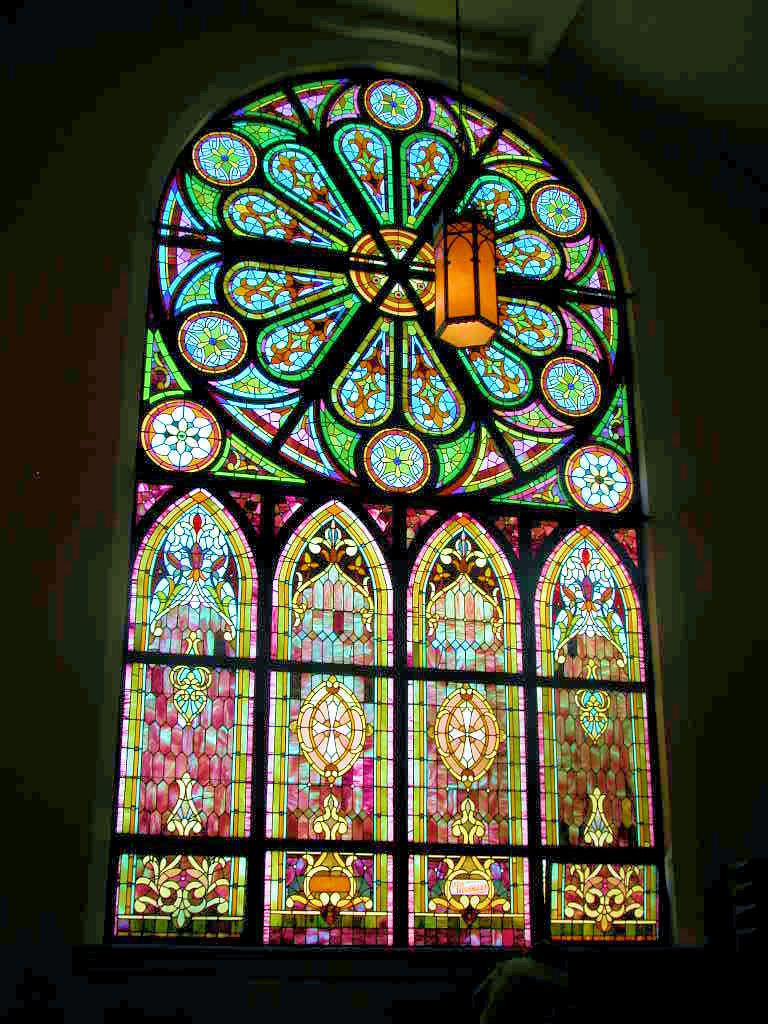
Large stained glass window on High Street side

One of the main features of the 1893 version of the church building was (and still is) a huge stained glass window on the High Street (west) side of the sanctuary. Over fifty years after the window's installation, it was still believed to be the largest window enclosed in one frame in the state of Indiana. The stained glass window was paid for by Mrs. George Gable as a memorial to her mother (Lydia Taughinbaugh), who was one of the charter members of the church. The glass was handmade in Belgium, and installed by local glass workers originally from that country. Ironically, most of Hartford City's Belgian-immigrant glass workers were Catholics living on the other (south) side of the city. Although Hartford City had numerous local glass factories by the next decade, Hartford City Glass Company was the only glass factory in town in 1892. Therefore, it can safely be assumed that the Belgian glass workers were employees of that glass factory. Old-timers may remember Belgian glass workers as employees of American Window Glass Company, which purchased Hartford City Glass just before 1900.

Smaller stained glass windows:

- A simple nativity of Jesus scene including the Star of Bethlehem.
- A crown of thorns with a broken cross symbolizing the crucifixion of Jesus.
- The traditional Holy Grail symbolizing communion.
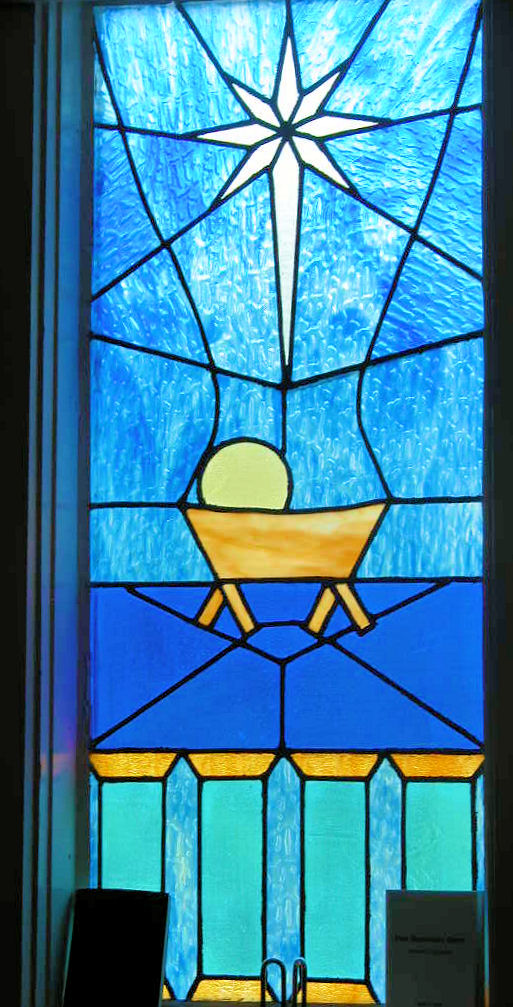
Nativity scene

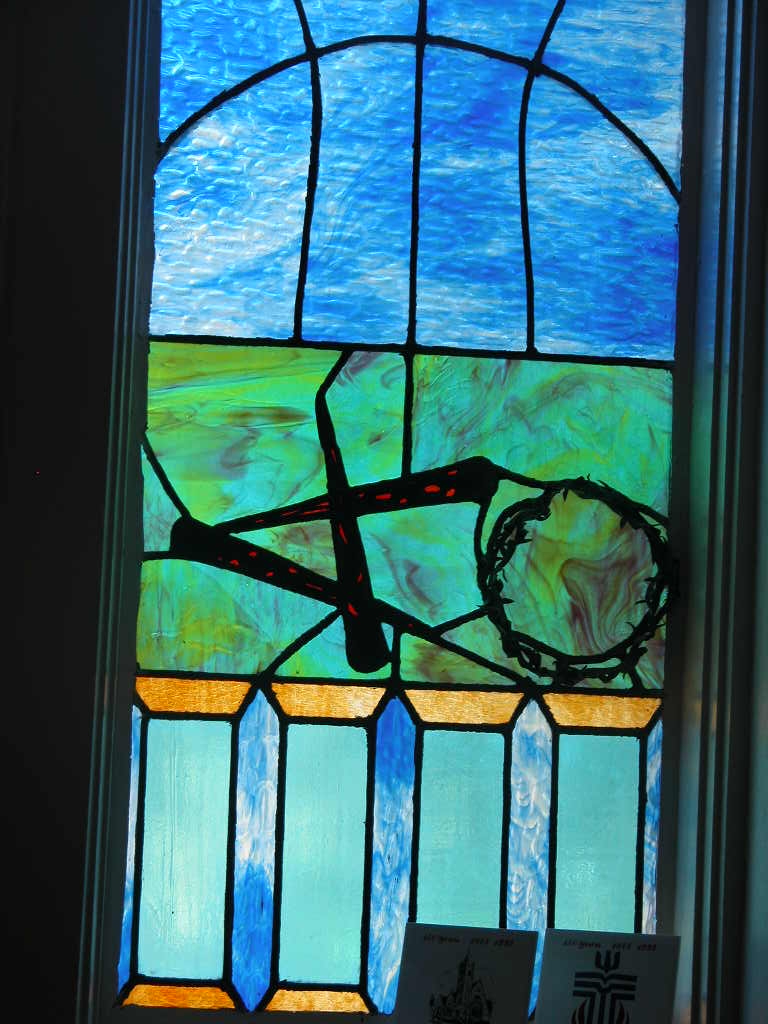
Crucifixion

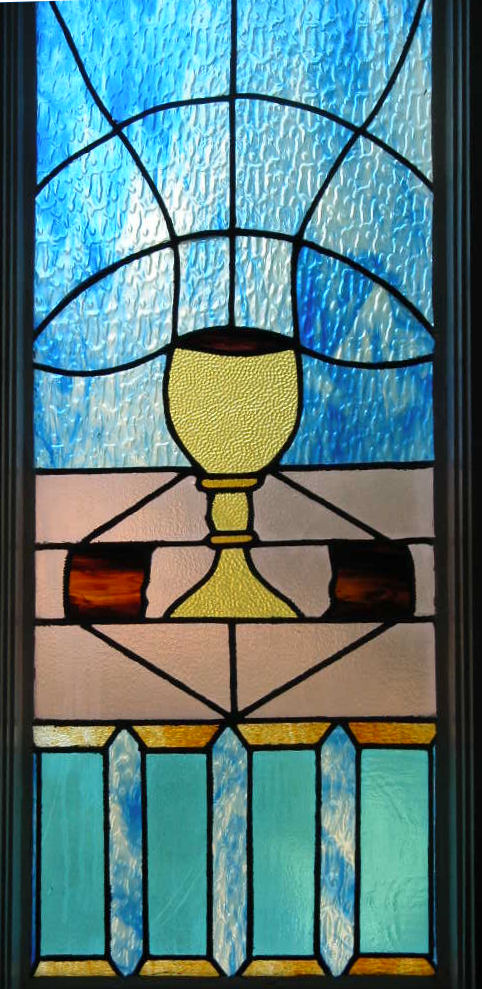
Holy Grail

== Additions and enhancements ==
First Presbyterian Church (Hartford City, Indiana) Pipe Organ and choir
Recorded live circa late 1960s (892 kb / 58 seconds)

The new building renewed interest in the Presbyterian Church. Membership in 1895 grew to 253, and Sunday school enrollment was over 300. Over the first one hundred years, minor changes were made to the church, including moving doorways and modifications to the sanctuary. For example, notice the door on the south side of the west wall on the right side of the pre-1910 picture herein (Construction section). A picture of the church from a publication dated 1895 also shows the south door. The door no longer exists, as can be seen in the west wall (High Street side) picture from 2010 (Architecture section). The door must have been removed early in “life” of the building, since a postcard of the church dated circa 1910 also does not have the south door on the west wall.

One of the first modifications to the interior of the church was the enlargement of the pulpit and choir platform. This was done to accommodate a larger choir. The platform was enlarged again in 1912, when the church purchased a pipe organ.

During the 1920s, Sunday School attendance peaked at 500. Because of the larger number of attendees of the Sunday School classes, it was proposed to add a building to the east end of the church's property. However, concerns about debt caused that plan to be abandoned, and replaced with a lower-cost plan. The plan involved closing off the east lecture room, and was implemented in the early 1930s. The result was a balcony on the east side of the sanctuary and six class rooms. A few years later, in 1936, the sanctuary was completely redecorated.

The 1930s and 1940s marked some of the peak years of the church's attendance. Newer generations of the city's prominent names from the church's 19th century membership, such as Emshwiller, Fulton, Gable and Willman, continued to be part of the church's congregation. The congregation was also well represented in the city's important glass industry, with surnames such as Crimmel (Sneath Glass Company) and Fulton (Fulton Glass Company). Membership during the 1940s was as high as 438. The last major change to the church structure was made in 1959, when construction began for an east wing. Currently, the bell (see photo herein) from the bell tower rests on the ground on the south side of the building. The bell was removed from the tower because of safety concerns and to reduce strain on the tower structure.

=== Pipe organ ===
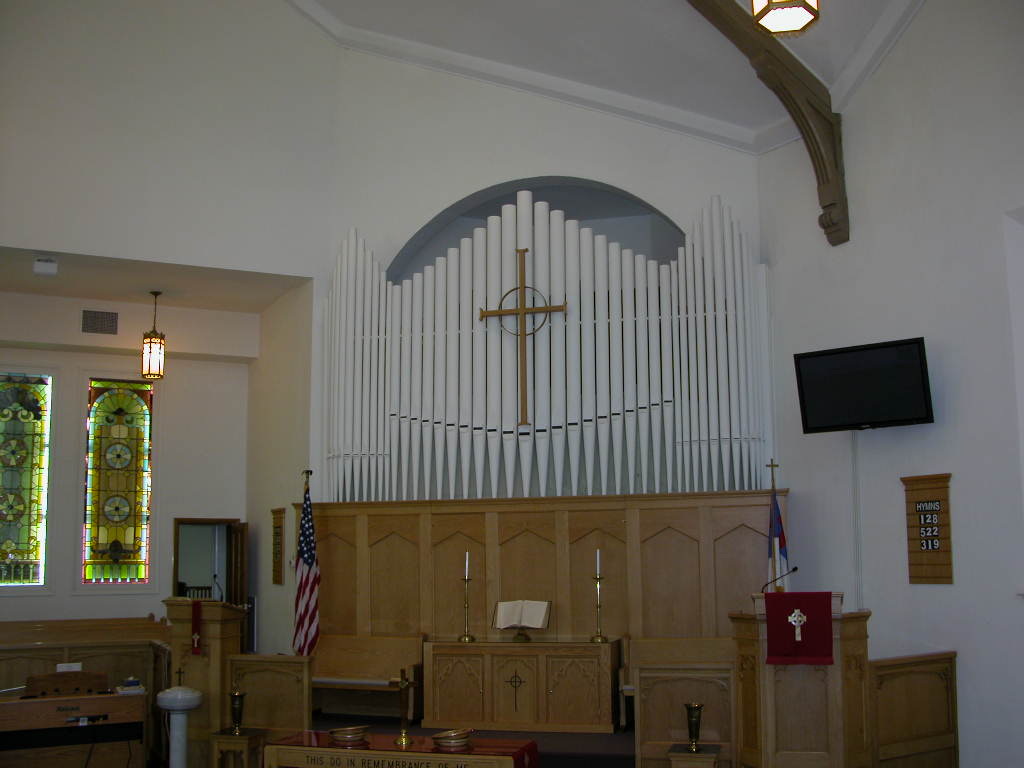
Pulpit and pipe organ in 2010

In 1908 the church received a new pastor, the Reverend George Sheldon. After a couple of years, Reverend Sheldon urged the congregation to secure a pipe organ. The various organizations of the church began raising funds. In addition, $1,000 was donated by Andrew Carnegie, who had retired from his many business enterprises and become a nationally known philanthropist. The new pipe organ cost over $2,000, and was installed in 1912 after the platform for the choir and pulpit was enlarged to accommodate the magnificent new instrument. The dedication recital was played by Professor Isaac Norris of DePauw University. The first regular organist was Professor Carl Bilby of Muncie, Indiana. The pipe organ is thought to be the city's first, and is still used today. The photo herein, from 2010, shows the church's pulpit and “pipe” portion of the pipe organ. “Smaller” stained glass windows can be seen to the left near the choir loft. These windows were part of the eastern wall of the church before the addition of the East Wing.

=== East wing ===
A two-story flat-roofed structure was added to the east side of the church in 1960. The addition was named Westminster Fellowship Hall, and its purpose was for fellowship and Christian education. Planning and fund-raising began in the spring of 1958. This was the only large-scale expansion of the church, and construction began with a groundbreaking ceremony in August 1959. Dr. John W. Halsey, pastor of the church, and other members of the congregation took turns with a symbolic shoveling of the earth. The total cost of the expansion was approximately $85,000.

== Present congregation ==
As of 2008, the church's congregation had 122 members. The Reverend David Smith is the current (2010) pastor. While the recent membership total reflects a decline from the pre-World War II peak years, it represents a small increase from earlier in the decade. The city's population has declined since the 1970s, as the region has suffered from the effects of a troubled American auto industry. However, Hartford City's First Presbyterian Church is still “a monument of which they [the community] may be justly proud.” The church conducts services in the city's historic district, in a historic building, located on land purchased in 1868. Situated at the corner of Franklin and High Streets, much of the church building looks the same as the outstanding structure constructed in 1892 and 1893. The edifice has existed in three different centuries – may it continue into a fourth.

== See also ==
- Presbyterian Church (U.S.A.)
