= Van Cleve Opera House =

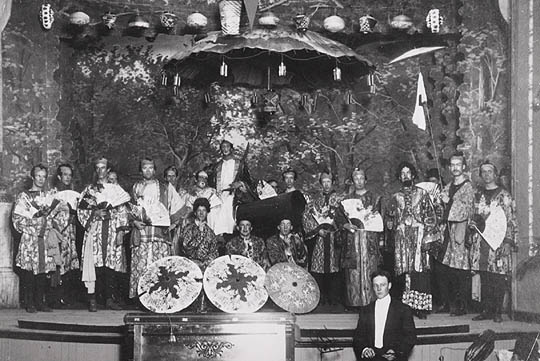
Performers at the Van Cleve Opera House in Hartford City, Indiana, circa 1895.

The Van Cleve Opera House was an opera house located in Hartford City, Indiana in the United States. It opened in 1882. As of 1884 it was claimed to be able to seat 700 people, but in 1902 it was seating 450 patrons. The opera house featured minstrel works, including around 1902, when "Mr. Mikado" by Frank Dumont was performed. The opera house also hosted academic lectures.
