= National Register of Historic Places listings in Blackford County, Indiana =

Location of Blackford County in Indiana

This is a list of the National Register of Historic Places listings in Blackford County, Indiana.

This is intended to be a complete list of the properties and districts on the National Register of Historic Places in Blackford County, Indiana, United States. Latitude and longitude coordinates are provided for many National Register properties and districts; these locations may be seen together in a map.

There are four properties and districts listed on the National Register in the county.

Properties and districts located in incorporated areas display the name of the municipality, while properties and districts in unincorporated areas display the name of their civil township. Properties and districts split between multiple jurisdictions display the names of all jurisdictions.

This National Park Service list is complete through NPS recent listings posted August 22, 2025.

== Current listings ==
	Name on the Register	Image	Date listed	Location	City or town	Description
1	Blackford County Courthouse	Blackford County Courthouse	August 11, 1980 (#80000053)	Off State Road 3; 40°27′06″N 85°22′05″W	Hartford City	Built mostly during 1894, the courthouse is an outstanding example of the Richardsonian Romanesque style of architecture, and still retains its original appearance. The courthouse is the center of the Hartford City Courthouse Square Historic District.
2	First Presbyterian Church	First Presbyterian Church	June 13, 1986 (#86001263)	220 N. High St. 40°27′10″N 85°22′06″W	Hartford City	Oldest church building in Blackford County; built in 1893 (during the Indiana Gas Boom) in the Richardsonian Romanesque style of architecture. Features huge stained-glass windows.
3	Hartford City Courthouse Square Historic District	Hartford City Courthouse Square Historic District	June 21, 2006 (#06000522)	Roughly bounded by Franklin, Walnut, Water, and Monroe Sts. 40°27′05″N 85°22′05″W	Hartford City	District was commercial, social, and governmental center of the city. Includes more than forty properties, most of which were constructed during the Indiana Gas Boom.
4	Montpelier Carnegie Library	Montpelier Carnegie Library	June 22, 2007 (#07000560)	301 S. Main St. 40°33′10″N 85°16′41″W	Montpelier	

== See also ==
- List of National Historic Landmarks in Indiana
- National Register of Historic Places listings in Indiana
- Listings in neighboring counties: Delaware, Grant, Jay, Wells
- List of Indiana state historical markers in Blackford County
