= Blackford County Courthouse =

- U.S. National Register of Historic Places
- U.S. Historic district – Contributing property
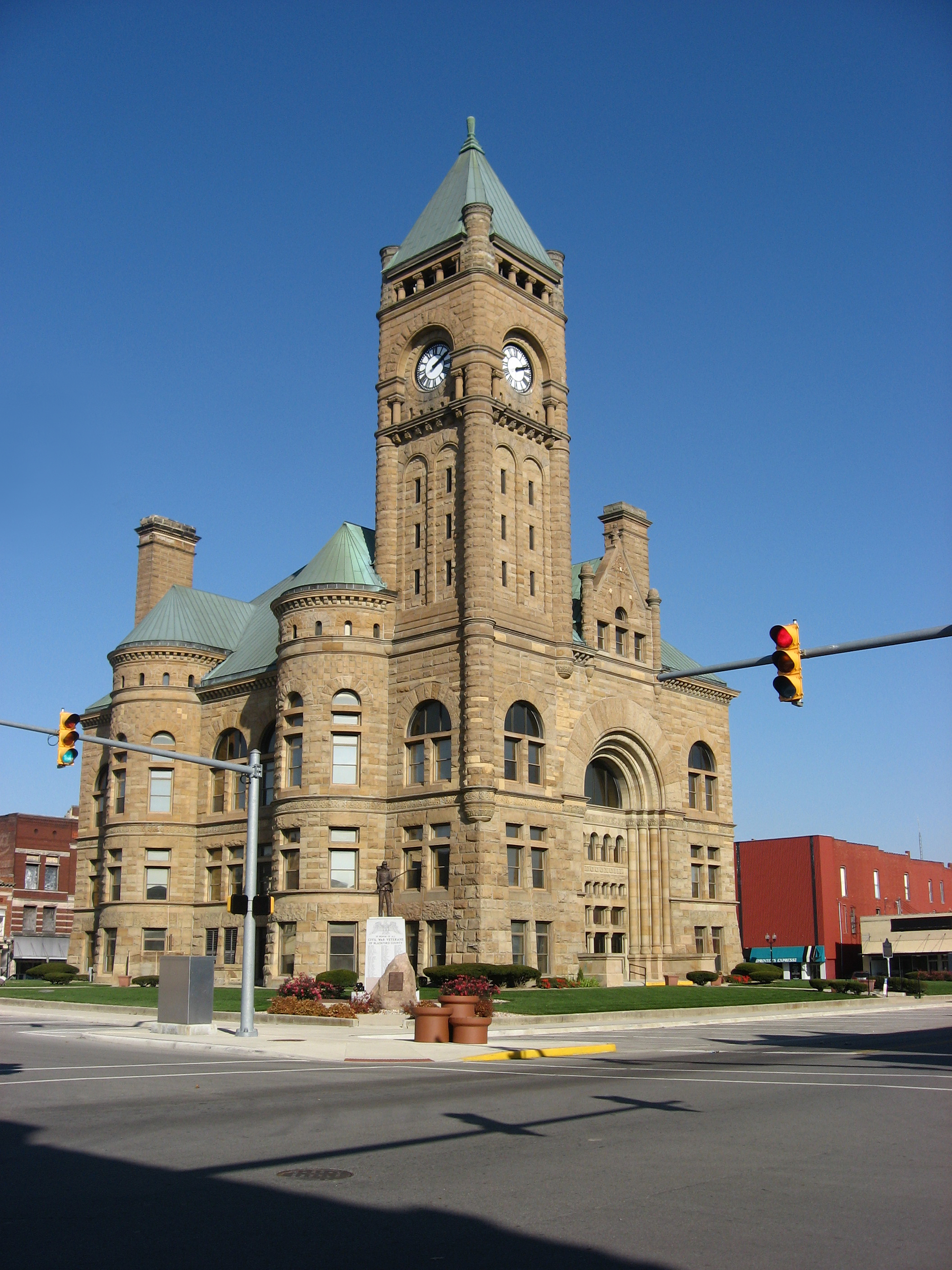
- Southwest corner of Blackford County Courthouse

- Location within Blackford County, Indiana
- Location: Off IN 3, Hartford City, Indiana
- Coordinates: 40°27′6″N 85°22′5″W
- Area: 1.5 acres (0.6 ha)
- Built: 1894
- Architect: LaBelle & French
- Architectural style: Romanesque, Richardsonian Romanesque
- Part of: Hartford City Courthouse Square Historic District (ID06000522)
- NRHP reference No.: 80000053

Significant dates
- Added to NRHP: August 11, 1980
- Designated CP: June 21, 2006

The Blackford County Courthouse is a historic building located in Hartford City, Indiana, the county seat of Blackford County. The building stands on a public square in the city's downtown commercial district. Built during the Indiana Gas Boom, most of the construction work was completed in 1894. The current courthouse was preceded by another courthouse building on the same site, which was declared inadequate by a judge in 1893, and was torn down. Following the condemnation of the original courthouse, the county's judicial activities were temporarily located in a building across the street.

The current courthouse was designed by architects Arthur LaBelle and Burt L. French, who were from nearby Marion, Indiana. The building's architectural style is Richardsonian Romanesque, which was popular during the second half of the 19th century. The large corner tower of the building is the tallest structure in the downtown commercial district. Considered "the county's most outstanding landmark", the structure is often pictured on web sites associated with the area, and continues to house local government over 100 years after its construction. (Note: Web sites (December 2011) that use pictures of the courthouse include the Hartford City web site, a page on the Blackford County Historical Society web site, the Blackford County web site, and the digital version of the (Hartford City newspaper) News-Times.)

In addition to the courthouse building, the buildings around the courthouse square are also historic in nature and considered contributing properties to the Hartford City Courthouse Square Historic District. The courthouse was added to the National Register of Historic Places in 1980 and was included as a contributing property to the historic district in 2006. Most of the buildings in the Courthouse Square Historic District continue to have facades that look similar to their original design. Although the interior has been remodeled, the exterior of the courthouse also retains its original appearance.

== History ==
The small cluster of log cabins called Hartford was designated the county seat of Blackford County in 1837, when legislation to create the county was proposed. Despite being created in 1838, no county government was organized until 1839, and there was some dissent over the location of the county seat. During June 1939, Indiana Governor David Wallace appointed Nicholas Friend as the new county's sheriff, and elections were held soon thereafter. The log cabin homes of county officials served as county government buildings during the first year of the county's organized existence. County affairs were first handled at the log cabin home of Andrew Boggs, which was located just north of Little Lick Creek in Licking Township. This cabin was, in effect, the capitol of Blackford County for about three months.

=== Site ===
Among the first orders made by the new county government was a survey of 40 acres (16 ha) of wilderness located to the north of Boggs’ cabin, parts of which had been donated for the purpose of housing the seat of government. A public square was to be located on 1 acre (0.4 ha) of land, on which the seat of justice was to be located. It was also ordered that the seat of justice was to be named Hartford. (Note: The original cluster of log cabins called Hartford was located by a creek near the southwest side of today’s Hartford City. Thus, "Hartford" was moved from a small group of log cabins to a wilderness area about 1-mile north. County officials designated an area to the north of the log cabins as the location of the county seat, and named it Hartford. Later, it was discovered that another Hartford already existed in Indiana’s Ohio County. To eliminate confusion, Blackford County’s Hartford was renamed Hartford City, and appears as Hartford City in an 1855 Post Office directory.) The 40 acres (16 ha) were owned by three individuals living in an adjacent county. The owners donated every other lot to the county as part of a plan to ensure that the county seat was located there—and increase the value of their property. Despite the county government's orders and plans, no action was taken on constructing a courthouse. In September 1839, the county commissioners began conducting business in the home of Jacob Emshwiller. For a few months, the Emshwiller home was the new capitol of Blackford County.

Montpelier, Indiana, is located in the northeastern portion of Blackford County, in Harrison Township. In late 1839, the location of the county seat was formally contested, as the citizens of Montpelier believed their community would be a better location. Montpelier had been platted in 1837, while the "town" of Hartford was still wilderness north of a cluster of log cabins. However, Licking Township, where Hartford was located, contained more of the county's population. Licking township did not have a platted community like Montpelier, but had attracted farmers because the land near Lick Creek had acceptable drainage.

The board of commissioners ruled against Montpelier in a January 1840, session. In November 1840, the board ordered the construction of a courthouse—which was to be located in Hartford. The plan was for a 25-foot -square (8 m), two-story, "hewed-log" courthouse. The commissioners went into considerable detail describing the building. However, the courthouse was not constructed because of continuing controversy over the location (Hartford or Montpelier) of the county seat.

In 1841, the commissioners again settled on Hartford as the location for the county seat, and planning for Blackford County's original courthouse began. On September 11, 1841, the Blackford County board of commissioners ordered that written proposals should be received to build a courthouse on the public square in the town of Hartford. The building was to be 40 feet (12 m) square, 25 feet (8 m) high, and built of brick on a stone foundation. The courthouse grounds occupied 1.5 acres (0.6 ha) instead of the 1 acre (0.4 ha) proposed in 1839. (Note: Shinn did not mention the size of the courthouse grounds in his Blackford County history. It is known that the second courthouse grounds occupies 1.5 acres (0.6 ha), and the second courthouse was constructed on the original courthouse property.)

=== Original courthouse ===
The contract for Blackford County's first courthouse was let on December 7, 1841, and construction was supervised by Charles and William F. Jones. The proposed cost for the courthouse was $5,600 (equivalent to $174,774 in 2025). Until the courthouse was ready, rooms were rented from various members of the community for conducting county government. By May 1845, an arrangement was made for the upper floor to be used for court proceedings until the entire building was completed. Finally, in a special session held October 31, 1845, the board of commissioners found that the courthouse had been completed according to contract. (Note: Shinn uses an 1845 completion date for Blackford County's original courthouse. A second source says construction was "completed in 1843". A third source agrees that court was held in a not-quite completed building beginning May 1845, but states the building was not completed until 1846.) The total cost for the courthouse building was $5,750.

The small community grew to a population of 250 by 1850, and it took 30 more years to get close to a population of 1,500. Early during that period, "Hartford" became known as "Hartford City" because another Hartford existed elsewhere in the state. In 1887, Hartford City Gas and Oil Company drilled Hartford City's first natural gas well, and Hartford City's participation in the Indiana Gas Boom began. The area experienced a period of economic growth and prosperity as manufacturers moved to the region to utilize the low-cost energy.

An 1887 description of the courthouse called it "a plain building…its architecture characteristic of the pioneer times". It also said the building "is still good enough were it only in better repair." On January 19, 1893, Judge Joseph L. Custer declared the "courtroom to be an inadequate place for the transaction of the business of this court", and that court business "be held elsewhere in some suitable place in the county seat."

=== Current courthouse ===
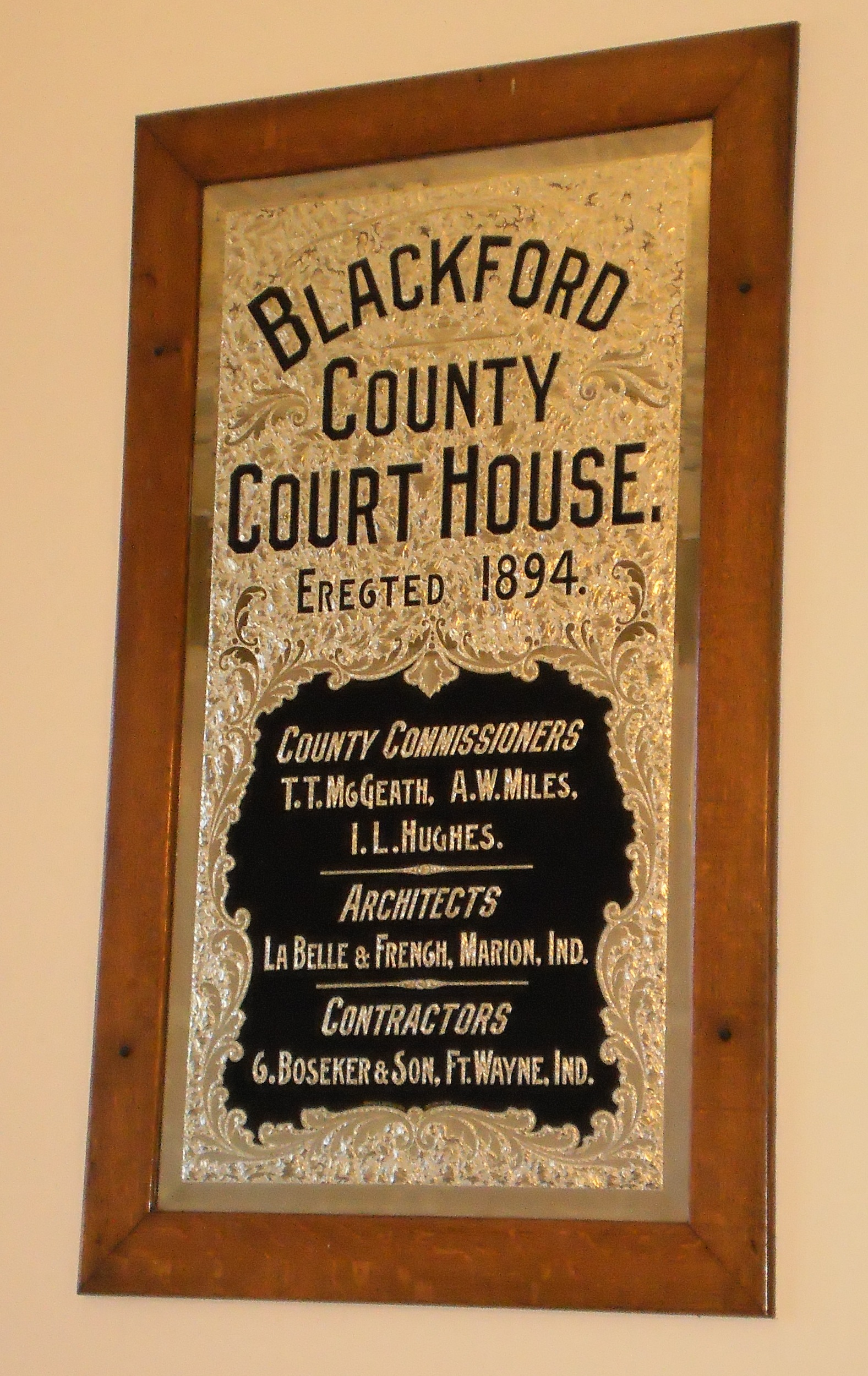
Commemorative plaque inside Blackford County Courthouse

The county commissioners responded in March 1893, to the Judge's declaration that the (original) courthouse was inadequate. The three commissioners, T. T. McGeath, I. L. Hughs, and A. W. Miles, ordered that a new courthouse was necessary. A week later, they engaged the Marion firm of LaBelle and French as architects for the new courthouse. Since the original courthouse was condemned, and Judge Custer (of the 48th Circuit Court of Indiana) refused to use it, arrangements were made to use the nearby opera house for courtroom proceedings until a new courthouse was available. On May 20, 1893, the old courthouse building was sold for $20, and removed from the grounds to enable construction of the new structure. In October, it was decided that the opera house was not suitable for courtroom proceedings because of possible theatrical conflicts, so rooms were rented at the newly built Briscoe Block building located on the south side of the courthouse square. Two rooms, with gas heat included, were rented for a total of $400 per year. One room would be for the circuit court, while the other was for the county clerk's office.

On June 8, 1893, LaBelle and French provided the county commissioners with a complete plan for the new courthouse. The architects designed a monumental stone courthouse in the Richardsonian Romanesque architectural style that was popular in the United States at that time. The four-story building measured 71 by 126 feet (22 by 38 m). It featured enormous arches on the northern and southern facades, semicircular towers on the east and west sides, and a 165-foot (50 m) clock tower on the southwest corner.

Although the community planned to build the courthouse as a monument to the city's (Gas Boom-related) prosperity, the commissioners were still concerned with costs. In late July 1893, the commissioners awarded the courthouse construction contract to the Fort Wayne firm of Boseker & Son. The price was cut to $97,000 by altering some of the architect's specifications. The stone chosen for the building was Amherst Blue from quarry number 9 in Amherst, Ohio. Work on the foundation was conducted in August, and the foundation stones were brought to town from Montpelier quarries located on the other side of the county.

On November 1, 1893, the city held a ceremony for the laying of the courthouse cornerstone. The local Free and Accepted Masons Lodge Number 106 ran the program. The ceremony included a parade, a welcome by prosecutor J. A. Hindman, a Masonic ceremony, an address by Mason Past Grand Master Martin H. Rice, and an address by historian Benjamin G. Shinn. (Note: Shinn is described as "a Civil War veteran, historian, patriot, and a minister".)

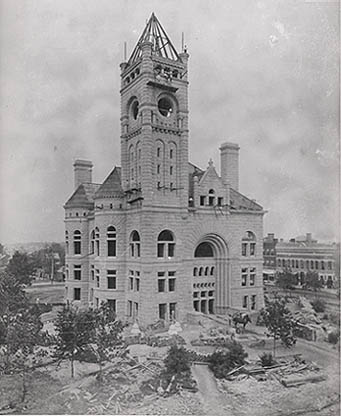
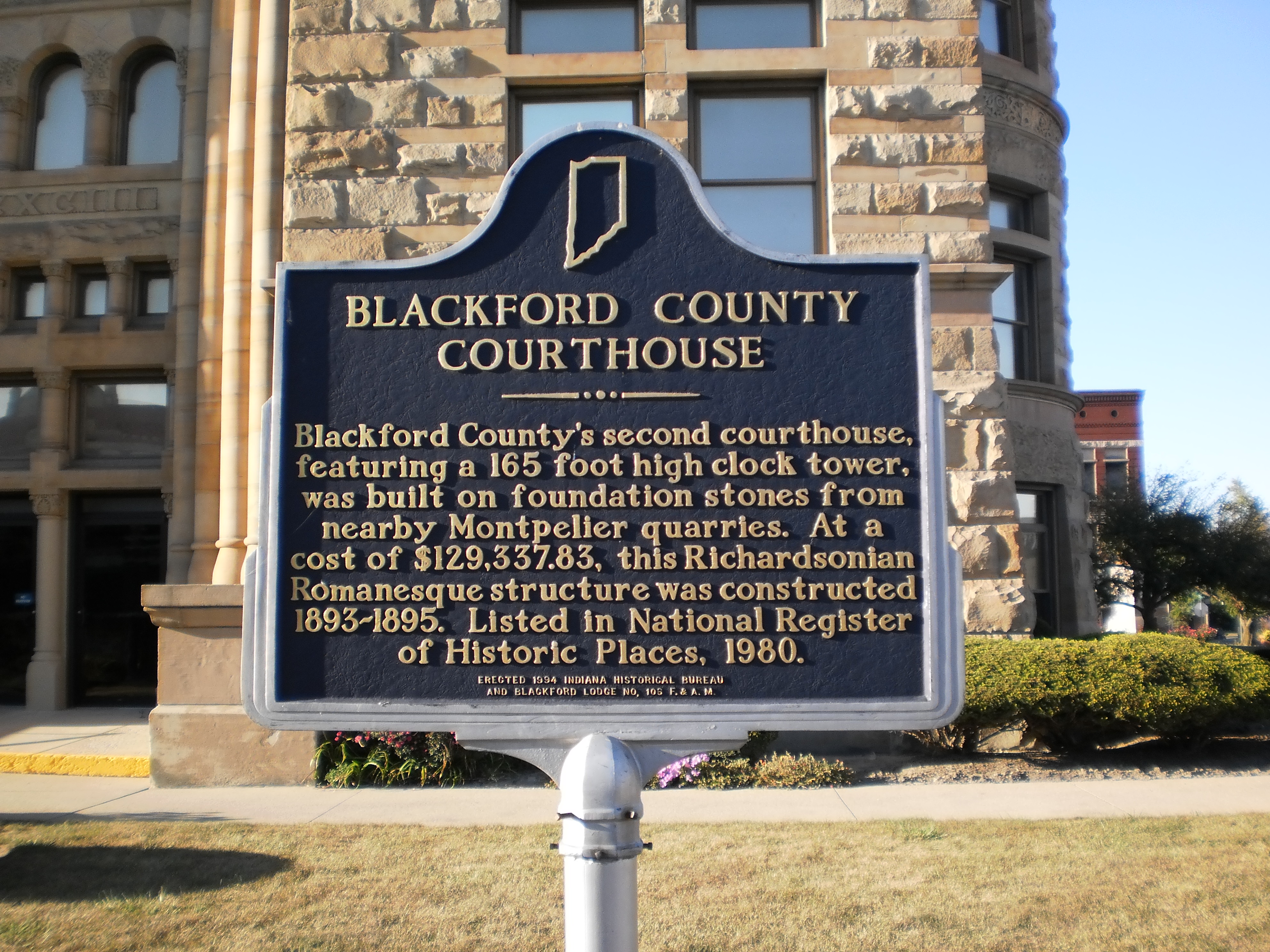
Courthouse under construction in 1894 (left) and current Historic marker

==== Construction ====
Although a harsh winter sometimes made work difficult, construction of the courthouse progressed far enough that work on the large (3 stories high) arch on the southern façade began during February 1894. Around the same time, work to carve the frieze above the second story was sublet to Gustave Steuber. Much of the carving work around the building's entrances was conducted under Mr. Steuber's direction. The building's cornice was finished in April, and nearly all of the structure's stone was cut by that time. By June, work was started on the clock tower, and almost all of the roof was completed in August. The tower's 4,000-pound (2,000 kg) clock arrived by rail in August from New Haven, Connecticut—although the tower was not ready to accommodate the timepiece until October. Installation of the clock was completed in November. By February 1895, the courthouse contractor considered the courthouse finished. (Note: A historical marker placed on the south lawn of the courthouse correctly lists the construction period as 1893–1895. Because most of the construction was completed during 1894, that year is sometimes cited as the construction date. For example, a plaque in the hallway of the courthouse (see September 2010 photo) says the building was "erected 1894".)

==== Construction completed ====
On February 27, 1895, county officials began moving into the new courthouse. Total cost for the new courthouse was $129,337 (equivalent to $4,812,829 in 2025). Most of that expense was paid to the contractor, Boseker and Son. Among other expenses included in the total were $2,000 paid to the E. Howard Clock Company of Boston, $7,000 for furniture paid to the H. Ohmer and Sons Company, and $6,158 for architecture.

After the courthouse was completed, it was discovered that some modifications were needed for its plumbing and heating system. Outside of the courthouse, steps were also taken to beautify the surrounding grounds. Sidewalks were added, and eventually hitching racks for horses. A war memorial was added to the northeast corner of the courthouse grounds in 1921, and this was the first of the major war memorials that occupy the corners of the courthouse lawn. A total of nine memorials, monuments and commemorative plaques have been added to the grounds within the courthouse square.

==== Today's courthouse ====
Today, the courthouse is still used by local government, and has a mailing address of 110 West Washington Street, Hartford City, Indiana. Hartford City's ZIP code is 47348. Courtroom facilities on the second floor of courthouse are used by the Blackford County Circuit Court and Blackford County Superior Court. The Blackford County Prosecutor also maintains an office in the building. The Blackford County commissioners meet on the first floor of the courthouse, and the county Clerk's office is also located on that floor. Additional office space is provided in the Blackford County Courthouse Annex, which is located across the street on the west side of the courthouse. The annex has an address of 121 North High Street. Among the offices housed in the annex building are the Blackford County Community Foundation, the Blackford County Emergency Operations Center, and the Blackford County Economic Development Corporation (including the County Assessor).

During December 2023, it was announced that the courthouse would undergo renovations. Renovations will be made to the clock tower, the clock in the tower, the roof, and windows. The work is expected to take over two years. Recent changes to security protocols mean that the public can enter the courthouse only from the North side. Both the North and South entrances will have temporary "roof"s added to protect the public from possible injury caused by falling debris.

== Architecture ==
Designed by the firm known as LaBelle and French of Marion, Indiana, the Blackford County Courthouse is considered an excellent example of Richardsonian Romanesque architecture, which was popular at the time. LaBelle and French also designed the White County courthouse in Monticello, Indiana; the Trumbull County courthouse in Warren, Ohio; and other buildings in the region. Listed December 31, 1974, the Trumbull County courthouse is also part of the National Register of Historic Places. Unfortunately, the White County courthouse was severely damaged by a "direct hit" from a tornado (rated as "F4" using the Fujita scale) during the 1974 Super Outbreak, and therefore demolished. LaBelle and French also designed one of Hartford City's hotels, and one of the city's many glass factories.

=== Exterior ===
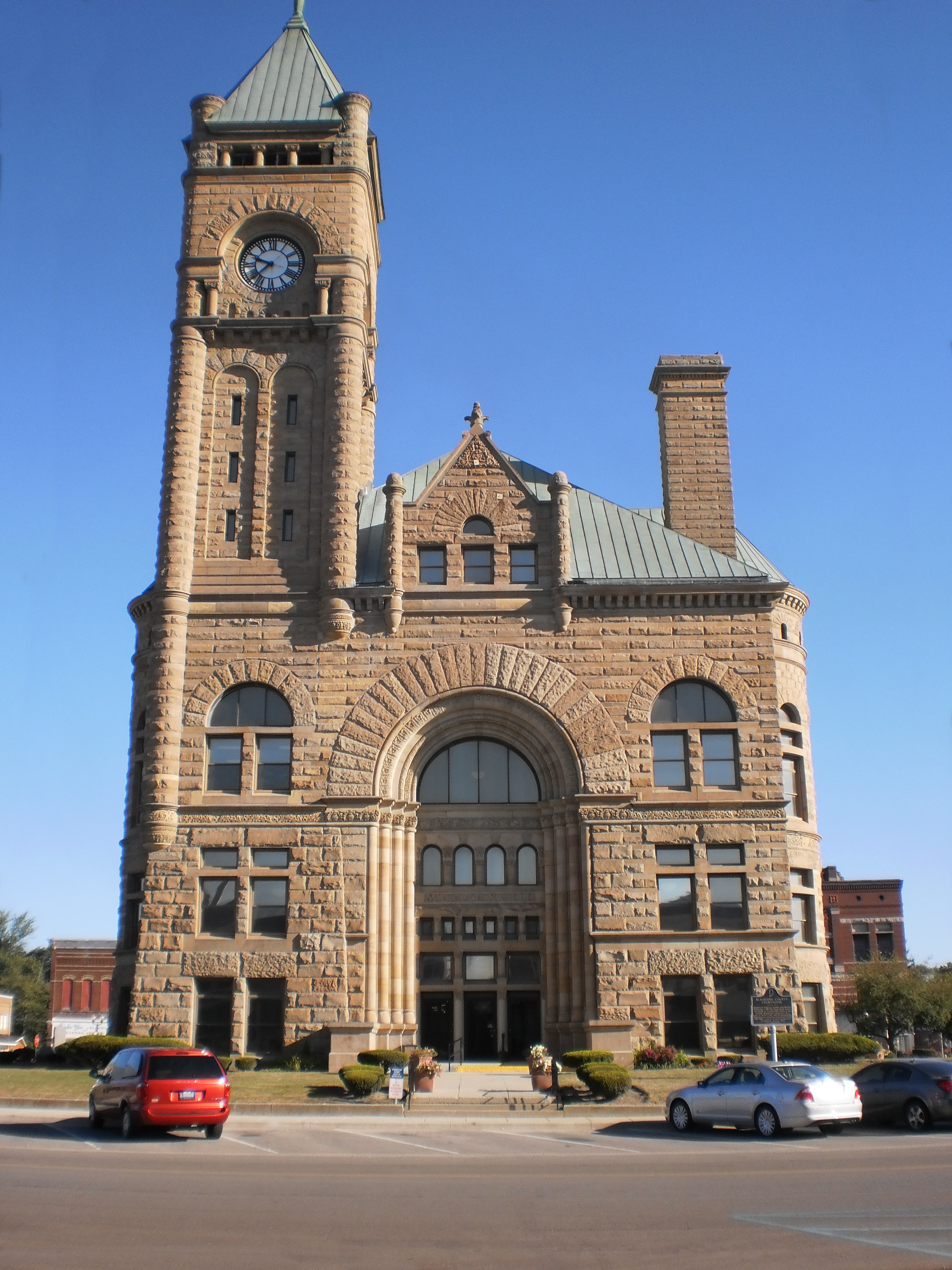
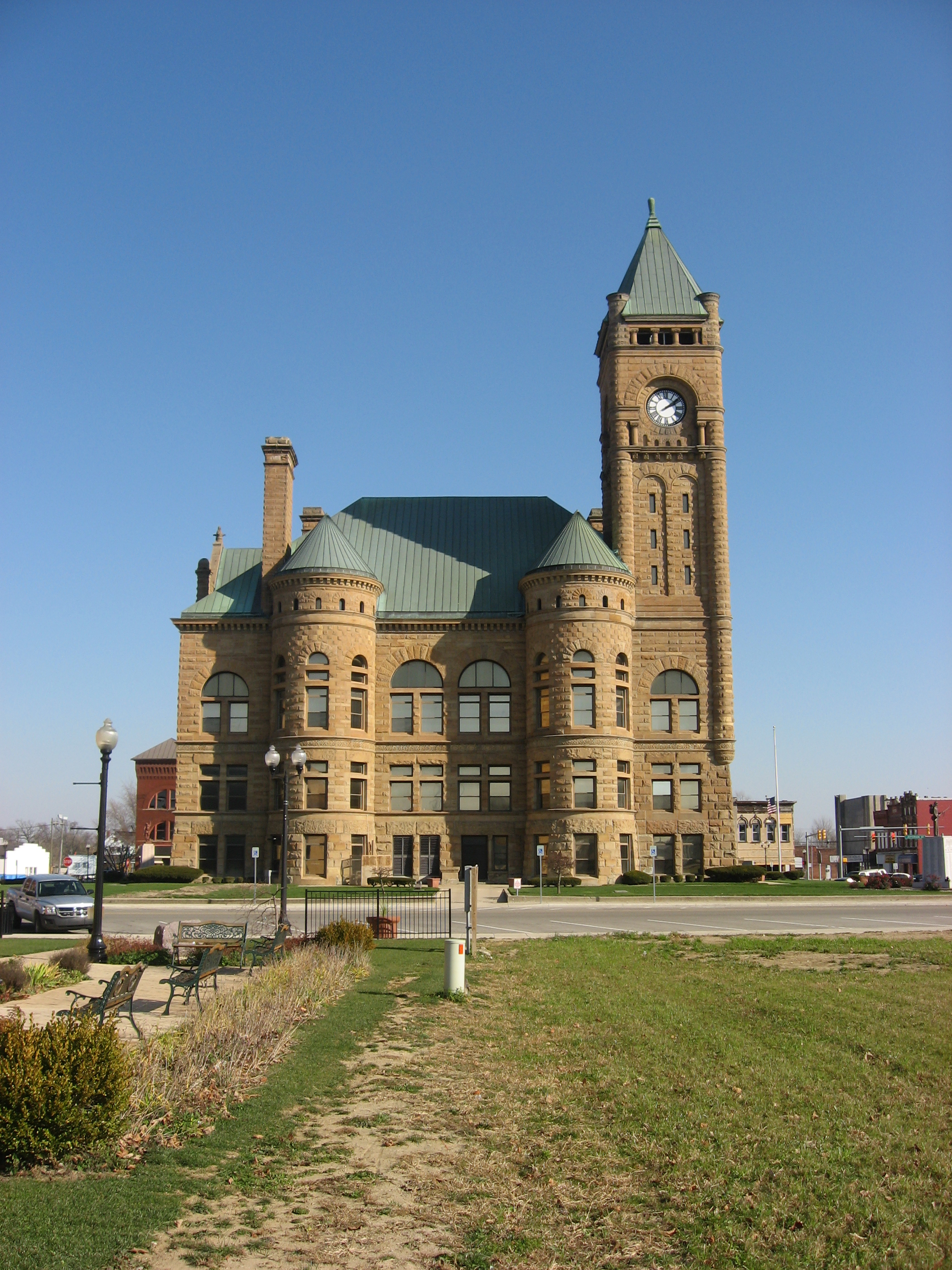
The southern facade (left) and western side (right) of the Blackford County Courthouse

The courthouse was built using Henry Hobson Richardson's variation of the Romanesque Revival style of architecture—which later became known as Richardsonian Romanesque. Constructed mostly during 1894, the four–story building features a 165-foot clock tower located on the southwest corner, and is the tallest structure in the area. (Note: The historical marker on the south side of the courthouse lawn describes the clock tower as 165 feet high—see photo. The tower is much taller than adjacent buildings, and can be compared to nearby structures using satellite photos or published photos such as the aerial view in the Blackford County Interim Report.) The roof is a high pitched hip roof, and exterior walls are made from stone.

The northern and southern facades of the structure are similar—each consisting of three bays. The central bay is occupied by a massive round-arched portal with enriched archivolts and a fan window. From the ground-floor doorway to the top of the large central bay arch measures about three stories high. A gabled dormer rises above the central arch. The dormer has three double-hung windows, and a central arched window resides above the middle. Each of the side bays has a set of windows for each floor, and the third floor windows are crowned with arched windows.

The huge clock tower is the main difference between the north and south facades. Located on the southwest corner of the courthouse, it is topped by a steeply pitched roof with round corner piers. Blind arcading is used on the upper portion of the tower between the clock faces and the roof of the main portion of the building. Three rows of slit windows are utilized within the blind arcading. A clock face can be seen on all four sides of the tower. An arch supported by Corinthian pilasters houses each face of the clock.

The east and west sides of the courthouse are identical up to the roofline. The west side also has the corner clock tower, which appears on the right when viewing toward the east. Both east and west sides have six bays. The first, third, fourth, and sixth bays have dual windows on each floor. A fan window crowns the dual windows on the third floor. The second and fifth bays are occupied by semicircular towers that rise above the bottom of the main roofline. The towers have three main windows on each floor, and the third floor windows are crowned with transoms that are crowned with fan windows. Above the towers’ third floor fan windows, near the top of the tower, are small arched windows resting above belt courses.

As time has passed, renovations and updates have been made to the courthouse and surrounding grounds. However, the courthouse exterior has retained its original form. Many of the nearby buildings, which were also built in the 1890s, also retain much of their original form. In 1940, the hitching racks around the courthouse square were removed, as automobiles had replaced horses as the preferred mode of transportation. Parking meters were added to the square in 1952. The building's stone exterior was refreshed by a sandblasting treatment in 1963. Exterior spotlights were added during the 1980s. The latest project to refurbish the courthouse moved forward during 2010. On December 6, 2010, the county commissioners decided to proceed with a courthouse preservation project that was estimated to cost in excess of $325,000.

=== Interior ===
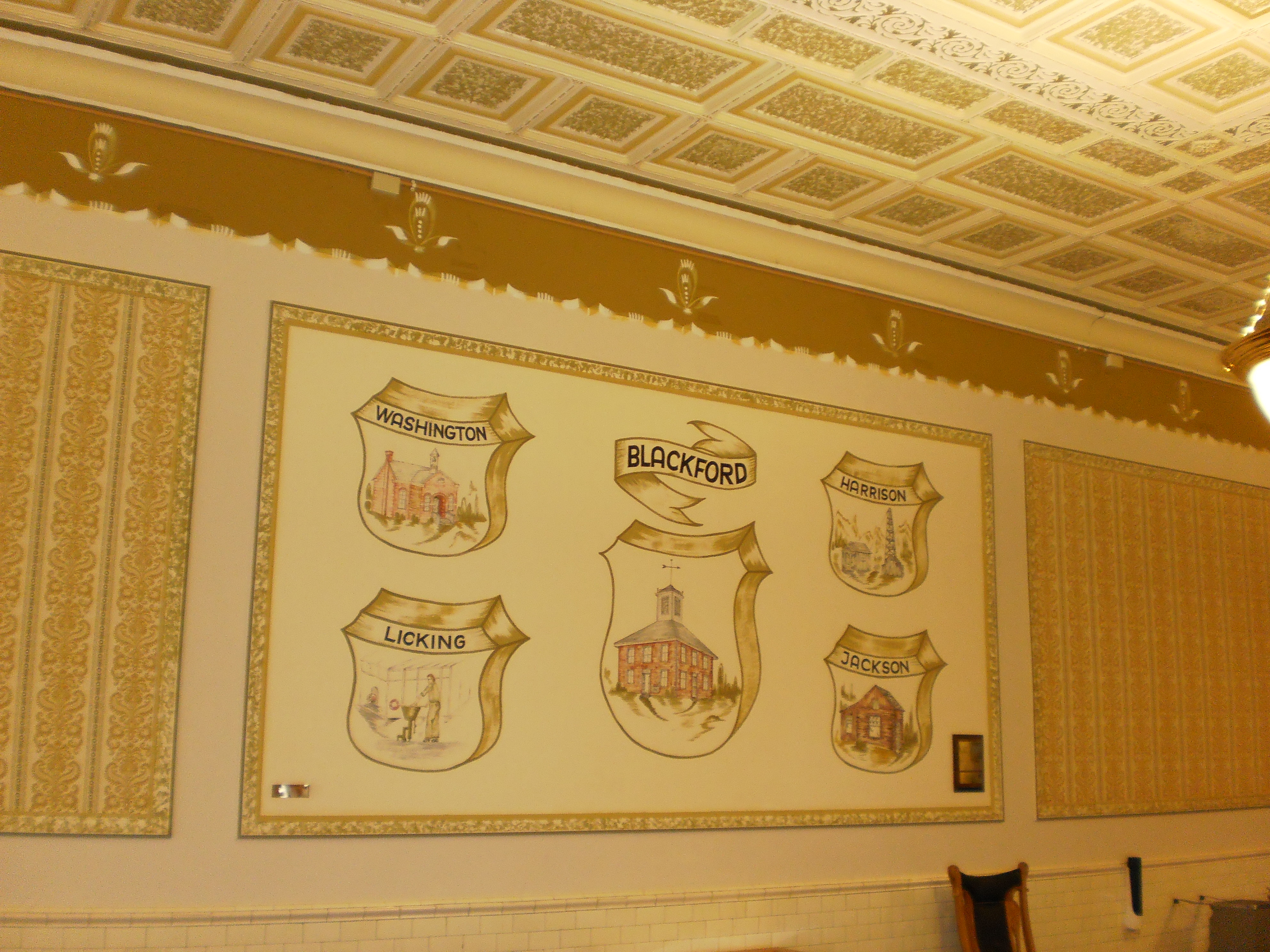
Wall, artwork, and ceiling in first floor hallway of the Blackford County Courthouse

The interior of the Blackford County courthouse has a twenty-two feet wide main hallway that runs between the northern and southern facades. The original floors were tiled, and the walls were wainscoted with marble. Stairways to the second floor are located on both the north and south sides. The south side stairway continues from the second floor to the third floor. The north side of the third floor is occupied by the courtroom, and this room accounts for about half of the floor. The space adjacent to the north–south hallway on all three floors is used for offices with the exception of the third-floor courtroom and a small library. The fourth floor is unfinished and used for storage. From the fourth floor, one can ascend a narrow stairway to the top of the bell tower.

The three finished interior floors have been renovated, modernized, and updated since the original construction. One step in modernization occurred in 1965, when an elevator was installed in the building. Among various renovations, the second and third floors were updated around 1980. Currently, the first floor has carpeting, fluorescent lighting, and acoustic ceiling tiles. The north and south facades now have modern glass doors that form vestibules at the entrances. The hallway ceilings have been molded with stenciling. Some painted scenes, which are not original to the building, can be found in the main hallway. One such scene includes a painting of the original courthouse surrounded by paintings of tablets representing each of the county's four townships, each with local scenes.

== Other features ==
The public square where the Blackford County Courthouse stands is the heart of the Hartford City Courthouse Square Historic District. In addition to the courthouse in the center of the square, each corner of the square is the site of a war memorial, including one that is considered a contributing property to the Hartford City Courthouse Square Historic District. Additional memorials are also located on the grounds.

=== Revolutionary War memorial ===
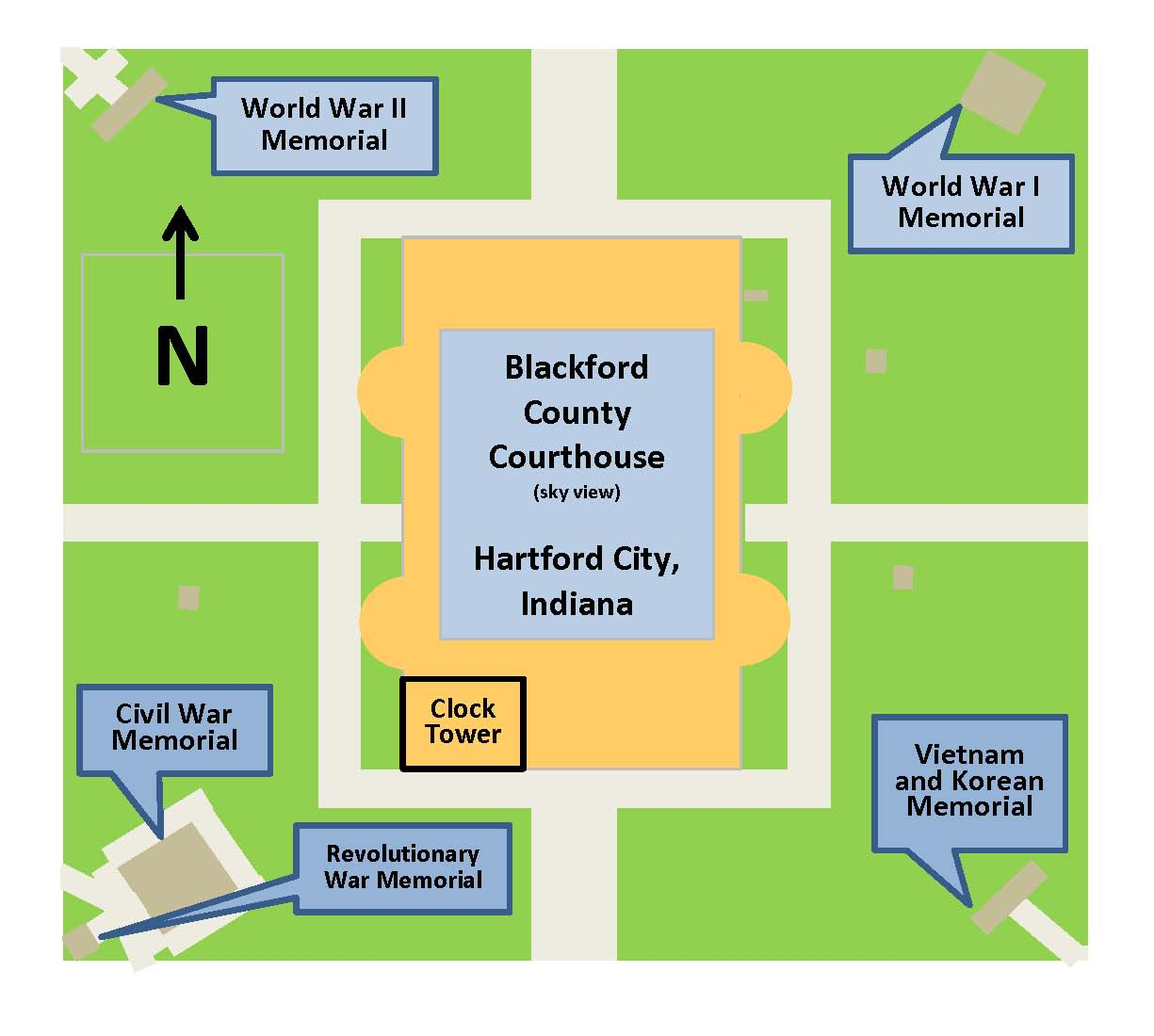
A diagram of the Blackford County Courthouse grounds

On the southwest corner of the courthouse stands the county's Revolutionary War memorial. Consisting of a commemorative plaque on a large stone, the memorial was placed in honor of Blackford County's five Revolutionary War veterans buried within the county. A dedication ceremony was conducted on June 17, 1933, by the Nancy Knight Chapter of the Daughters of the American Revolution. The dedicatory address was given by the Reverend H. C. Cornuelle, pastor of the local First Presbyterian Church. The stone was from the Twin Hills gravel pit in nearby Jay County.

=== World War I memorial ===
Blackford County's World War I memorial was unveiled on the northeast corner of the courthouse square on September 28, 1921, in a dedication ceremony with James Taylor, president of Taylor University as the speaker. The memorial is a reproduction of a sculpture known as the "Spirit of the American Doughboy", which was created by Ernest Moore Viquesney. Beneath the Doughboy sculpture is a list of Blackford County residents that served in World War I. The monument was partially funded by a contribution from the ladies of the Service Star Legion.

=== World War II memorial ===
Blackford County's World War II memorial is located on the northwest corner of the courthouse square. Its dedication ceremony was held on May 30, 1950. City attorney Robert Bonham gave the dedication address. The monument lists over 1,880 names of veterans associated with Blackford County.

=== Korea and Vietnam War memorial ===
Blackford County's monument to veterans of the Korean and Vietnam wars is located on the southeast corner of the courthouse square. Congressman David Dennis spoke at the 1973 dedication of this monument. The monument, originally contained a list of the county's war dead from the two wars. It was expanded in 1987 to include all of the county's veterans of the two wars. A tablet on the left of the monument lists veterans of the Korean War, while a tablet on the right side lists veterans of the Vietnam War.

=== Monument to Veterans of the Civil War ===
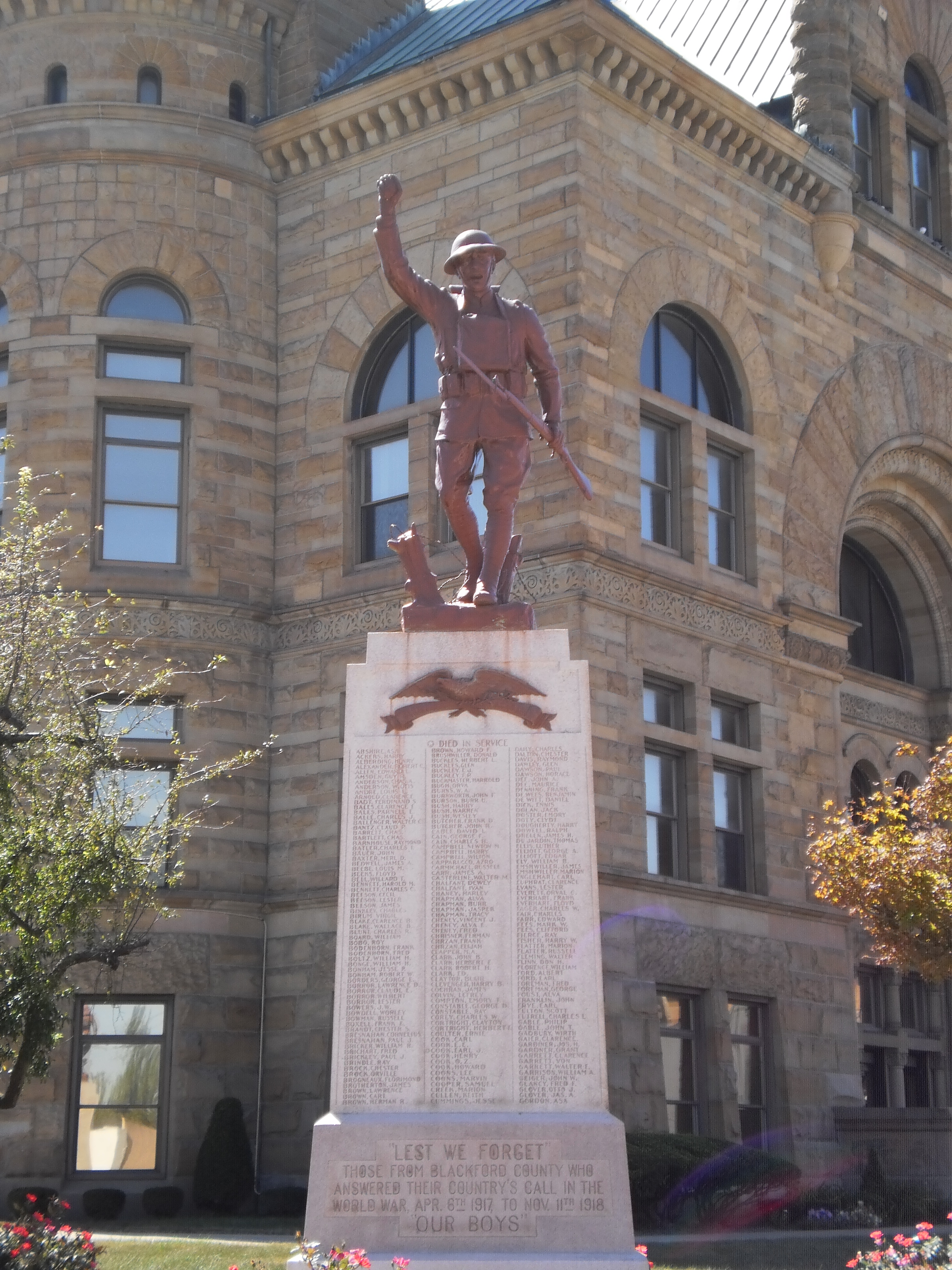
World War I monument on northeast corner of courthouse grounds

Blackford County's Civil War monument is located on the southwest corner of the courthouse square. The Blackford County Civil War Re-enactment Club is responsible for the monument. The project began with a Memorial fund in 1997, and progressed for about 10 years to completion of the project. Construction of the monument began in 2004 with a granite base, pedestal, and walkway. A dedication for that portion of the monument was held on October 9, 2004. The sculpture of the civil war soldier was added a few years later. Stacks of black granite cannonballs were added to each corner of the monument in 2007. The monument recognizes all soldiers associated with Blackford County: soldiers who lived in the county at the start of the war, soldiers who enlisted in the county, soldiers buried in the county, and veterans who moved to the county after the war.

=== Other monuments and commemorative plaques ===
The Blackford County Courthouse lawn is also the site of some smaller commemorative plaques. An early addition was the Orville Whitacre Memorial Marker, which was added in 1922. The H. C. Cornuelle Memorial Marker was added in 1936. The Reverend Herbert C. Cornuelle served in World War I as a chaplain in the United States Army. After the war, the American Legion named him chaplain for the state of Indiana. He also became the minister of Hartford City's First Presbyterian Church—serving from 1928 until 1936. During Work War I, Cornuelle suffered permanent injury from a gas attack, and his injury contributed to his death from pneumonia on April 21, 1936. A second plaque, the Bicentennial Capsule Marker, was also added in 1936. Many years later, a Blackford County Courthouse Cornerstone Rededication Marker was added in a ceremony on November 13, 1993. The Free and Accepted Masons conducted the ceremony, and a time capsule was presented by the presidents of the Blackford County Historical Society and the Montpelier Historical Society. A Blackford County Courthouse Historical Marker was placed on October 1, 1994, by the Indiana Historical Bureau and the Blackford Lodge Number 106 of the Free and Accepted Masons.

== Significance ==
The Blackford County Courthouse was added to National Register of Historic Places on August 11, 1980. On June 21, 2006, its historic importance was reasserted when it was included as a contributing property in the Hartford City Courthouse Square Historic District's listing on the National Register. On its original National Register nomination form, the building was cited as significant in the areas of "architecture" and "politics/government." The courthouse has been "the focus of governmental, political and civic affairs," and "its size and architecture dominate" downtown Hartford City. In addition, the war memorials on the courthouse grounds contribute to the sense of time and place that the Hartford City Courthouse Historic District conveys.

== See also ==
- List of properties in Hartford City Courthouse Square Historic District
- National Register of Historic Places listings in Blackford County, Indiana

== Notes and references ==
=== Cited works ===
- Beeson, Cecil E. Blackford County History. Hartford City, Indiana: Blackford County Historical Society. OCLC 247154715.
- Beeson, Cecil E.; Bonham, John A. (1974). '76 and Blackford County, Indiana. Fort Wayne, Indiana: Fort Wayne Public Library. OCLC 3402347.
- Beetem, Debra (January 1980). "Blackford County Courthouse" (PDF). National Register of Historic Places Inventory—Nomination Form. National Park Service. Archived from the original (PDF) on October 14, 2012.
- Blackford County Historical Society (Ind.) (1986). A History of Blackford County, Indiana : with historical accounts of the county, 1838–1986 [and] histories of families who have lived in the county. Hartford City, Indiana: Blackford County Historical Society. OCLC 15144953.
- Blackford County Historical Society (Ind.) (1995). Gas Belt Review. Hartford City, Indiana: Blackford County Historical Society. OCLC 34018626.
- Chamberlain, E. (1850). Indiana gazetteer: or, Topical dictionary of the state of Indiana. Indianapolis: Chapmans & Spann's Power Press. OCLC 7376375.
- Esarey, Logan (1918). A History of Indiana from 1850 to the Present (Vol. II). Indianapolis: B. F. Bowen and Company. OCLC 1355506.
- Free & Accepted Masons Blackford Lodge #106 (1993). "Blackford County Courthouse Cornerstone Centennial Celebration". Schedule of Events. Free & Accepted Masons Blackford Lodge 106.
- Hamilton, Kristi; Abraham, Kent; Lankford, Susan (2005). "National Register of Historic Places Nomination: Hartford City Courthouse Square District" (PDF). National Register of Historic Places. National Park Service. Archived from the original (PDF) on October 10, 2012.
- Historic Landmarks Foundation of Indiana (2005). Blackford County: Interim Report, Indiana Historic Sites and Structures Inventory. Historic Landmarks Foundation of Indiana. ISBN 978-1-889235-20-2. OCLC 62513317.
- Historical Committee (1943). "The First 100 Years". Centennial Brochure. First Presbyterian Church of Hartford City, Indiana.
- Indiana Historical Bureau; Free & Accepted Masons Blackford Lodge #106 (1994). "Dedication of Blackford County Courthouse Historical Marker". Invitation. Indiana Historical Bureau.
- Leech, D.D.T., ed. (1855). "List of Post Offices in the United States and the Names of Postmasters, on the 1st of July, 1855..." List of the Post-Offices in the United States; with counties in which they are situated, and their distances from Washington City. Washington, D.C.: United States Post Office. OCLC 8692809.
- Shinn, Benjamin Granville (1900). Biographical memoirs of Blackford County, Ind: to which is appended a comprehensive compendium of national biography ... embellished with portraits of many well known residents of Blackford County, Indiana. Chicago: The Bowen Publishing Company. OCLC 3554406.
- Shockley, E. V. (1914). "County Seats and County Seat Wars of Indiana". Indiana Magazine of History. X (1). Bloomington, Indiana: Indiana University Department of History. OCLC 2371402.
- Unlisted (Biographical and historical record...) (1887). Biographical and historical record of Jay and Blackford Counties, Indiana: Containing ... portraits and biographies of some of the prominent men of the state : engravings of prominent citizens in Jay and Blackford Counties, with personal histories of many of the leading families and a concise history of Jay and Blackford Counties and their cities and villages. Chicago: The Lewis Publishing Company. OCLC 15560416. Archived from the original on August 7, 2011.
