= Hartford City, Indiana =

- City
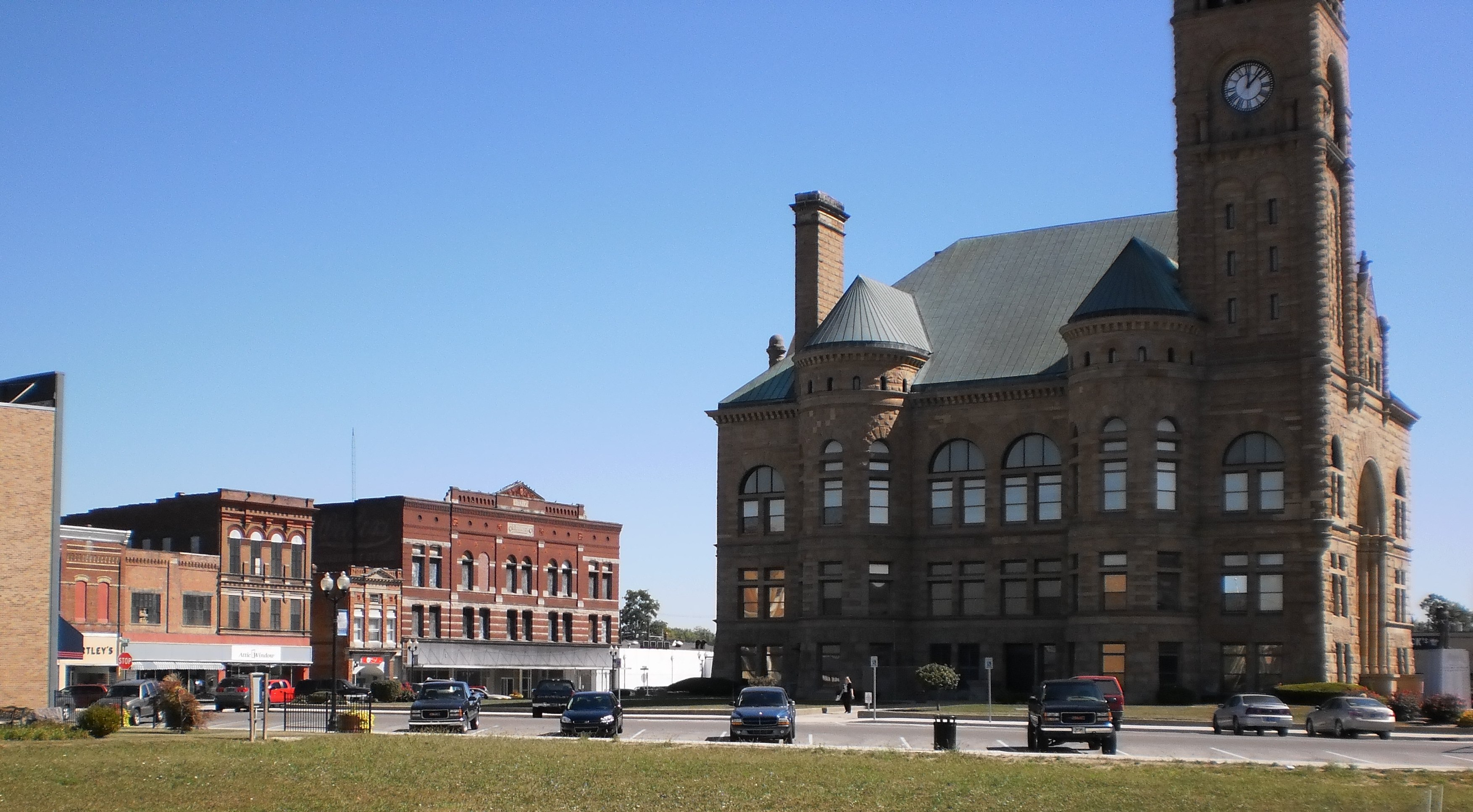
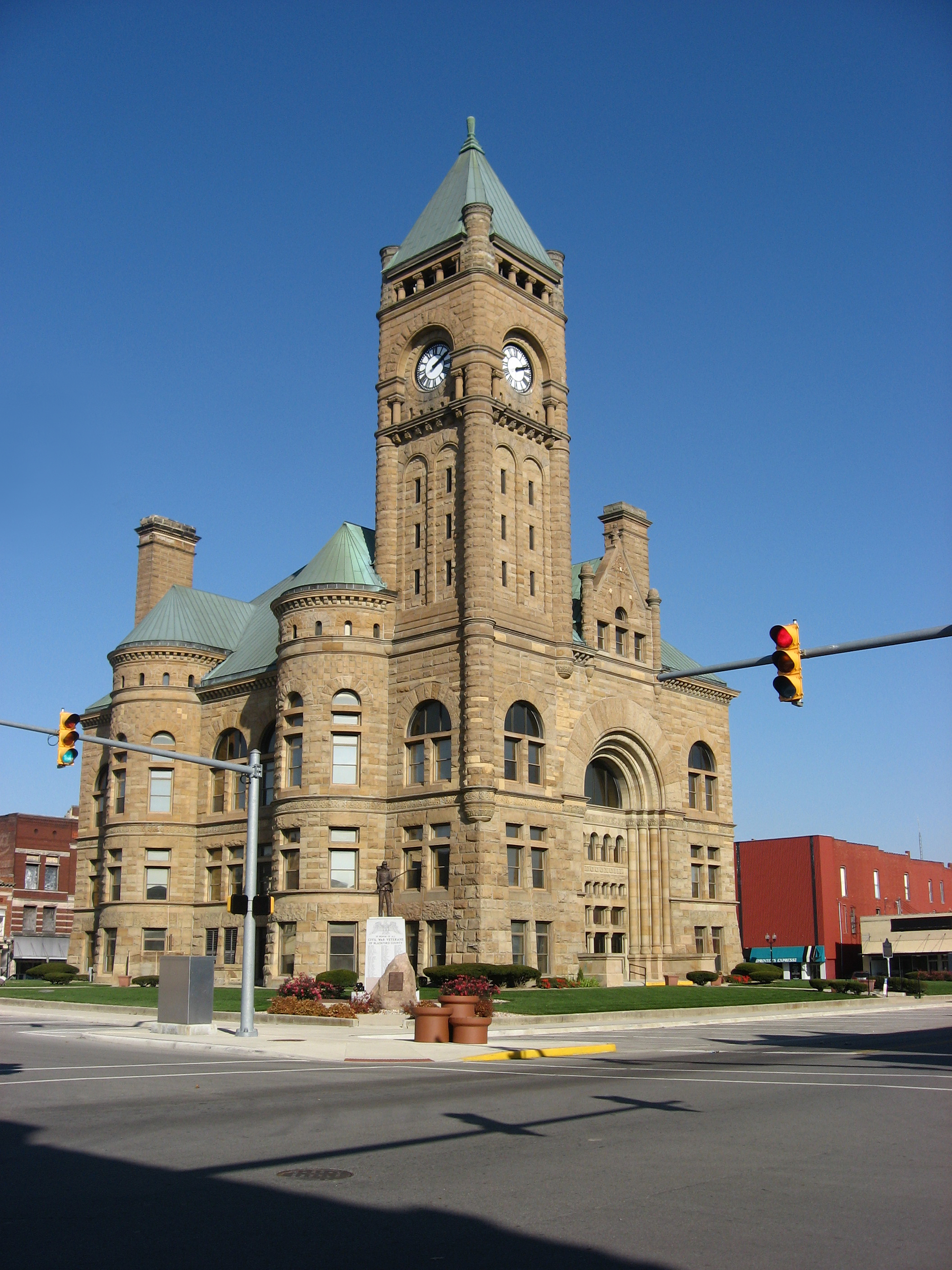
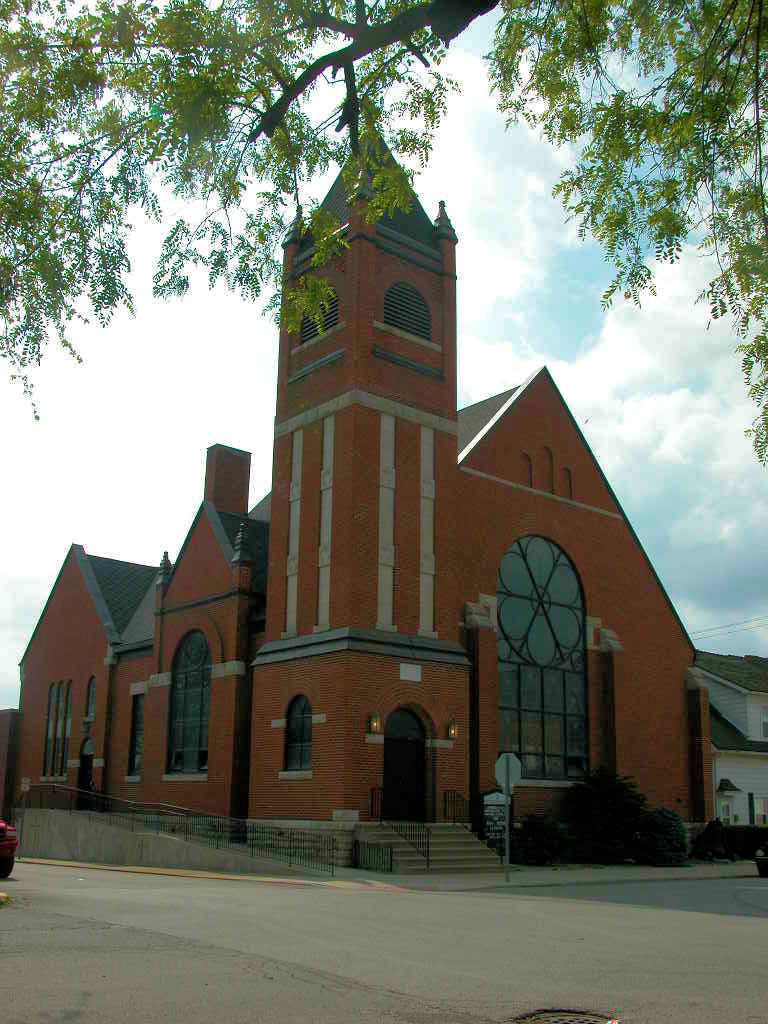
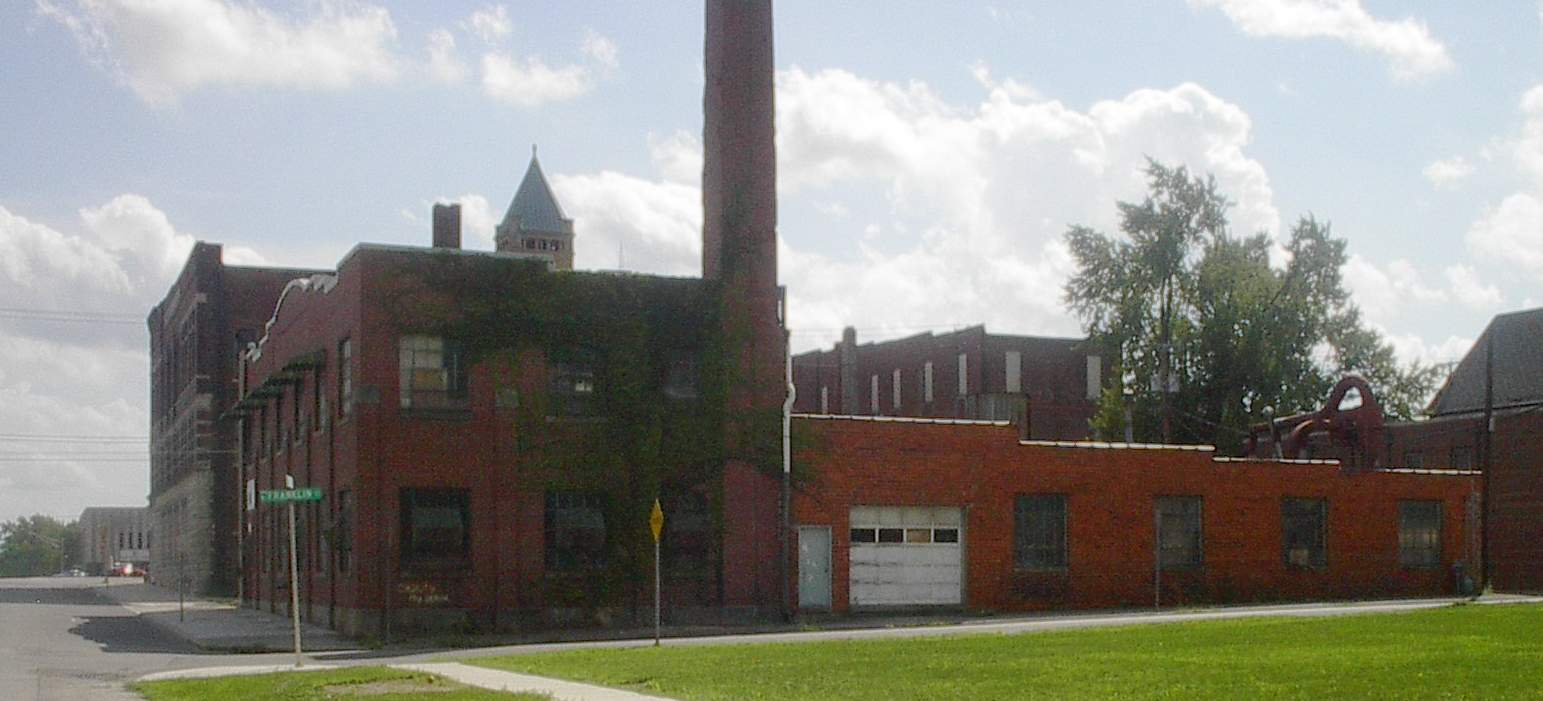
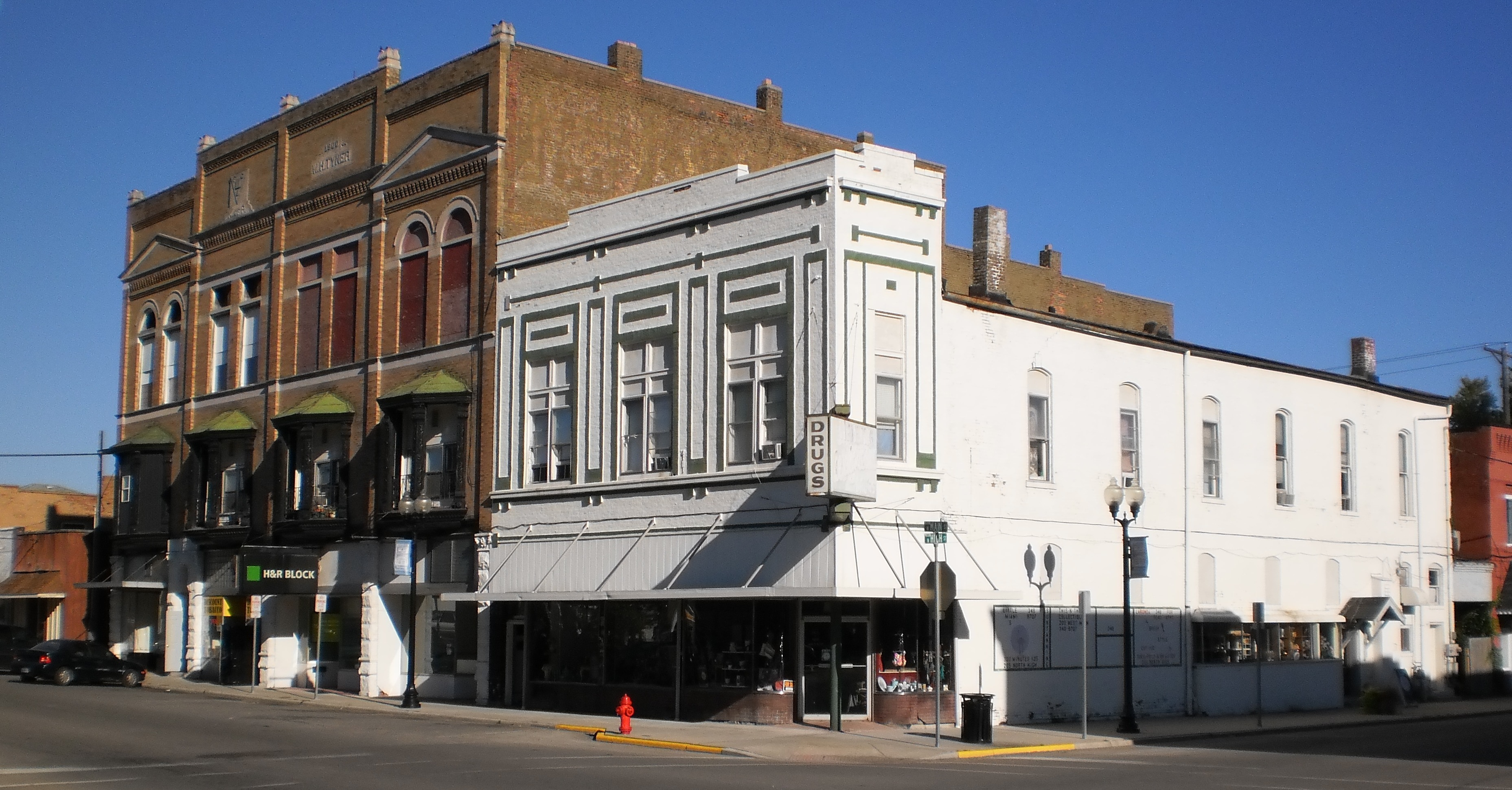
- Downtown Hartford City Blackford County Courthouse First Presbyterian Church Cox Building Tyner and Gough Buildings

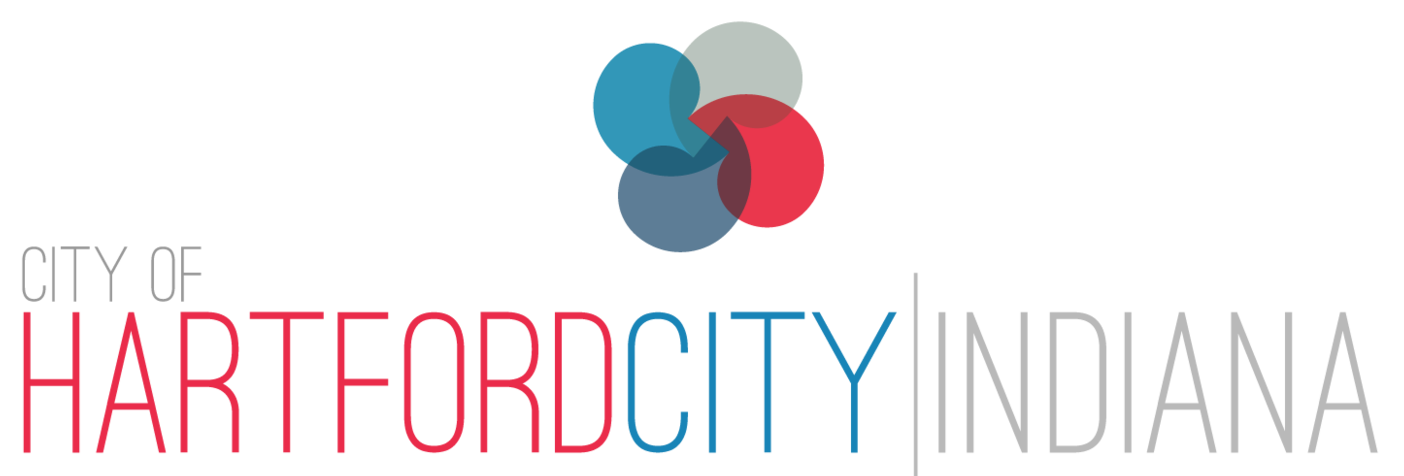
- Flag Seal Logo
- Motto: "The One And Only"
- Location of Hartford City in Blackford County, Indiana.
- Coordinates: 40°27′16″N 85°22′44″W
- Country: United States
- State: Indiana
- County: Blackford
- Township: Licking
- Officially named: 1839
- Incorporated (town): 1857
- Incorporated (city): 1894

Government
  - Type: Mayor-council government
  - Body: Hartford City Council
  - Mayor: Dan Eckstein (R)

Area
  - Total: 3.90 sq mi (10.10 km^{2})
  - Land: 3.88 sq mi (10.05 km^{2})
  - Water: 0.019 sq mi (0.05 km^{2})
- Elevation: 919 ft (280 m)

Population (2020)
  - Total: 6,086
  - Estimate (2025): 5,944 ▼
  - Density: 1,567.8/sq mi (605.34/km^{2})
- Time zone: UTC-5 (Eastern)
  - Summer (DST): UTC-4 (Eastern)
- ZIP code: 47348
- Area code: 765
- FIPS code: 18-32242
- GNIS feature ID: 2394309
- Website: www.hartfordcity.net

Hartford City is a city in the U.S. state of Indiana, and the county seat of Blackford County. Located in the northeast central portion of the state, the small farming community underwent a dramatic 15-year economic boom beginning in the late 1880s. The Indiana Gas Boom resulted from the discovery and exploitation of natural gas in the area. The rural economy was transformed to one that included manufacturing. The boom attracted workers and residents, retail establishments, and craftspeople. The increased population was a catalyst for the construction of roads, schools, and churches. After the boom came a long period of growth and stability. Agriculture (and agricultural trade) remained as the basis for the economy.

From the 1920s through the 1970s, Hartford City continued to thrive. Agricultural automation and consolidation of small farms into industrial-size farms resulted in a decline in the population; the small farmer became unable to compete and fewer laborers were needed. Some workers turned to the manufacturing and construction sectors for employment in nearby cities. However, manufacturing hubs such as Muncie and Marion suffered the collapse of their economies during industrial restructuring when large factories closed. Despite the decline, Hartford City was able to retain the paper company, 3M.

The city government has concentrated on bringing manufacturing to Hartford City and has had some success in securing state funding for businesses that use recycled or agricultural materials in the manufacturing process. Younger people leave to attend college and pursue professional careers outside the scope of those available in Hartford City. Community college, private colleges, and a university are within commuting distance; however, Hartford City lacks rental housing appropriate to college students or young adults. The town's population was 6,086 in the 2020 United States census, down from 6,220 in the 2010 United States census.

== History ==
=== Etymology ===
Hartford City, Indiana began in the late 1830s as a few log cabins clustered near a creek. Folklore taught in local elementary schools suggests that Hartford City was originally known as "Hart's ford," a place to cross Lick Creek. The name evolved to Hartford, and eventually to Hartford City. (This was to avoid confusion with another Hartford in the state.)

=== Early history ===
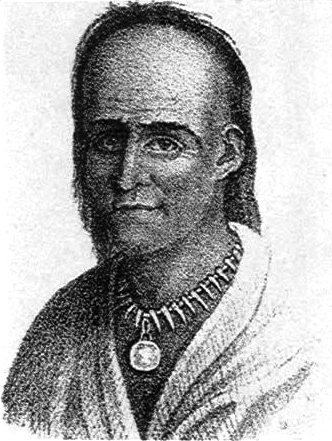
Little Turtle, a Miami Indian Chief

Prior to European-American settlement, the area that became Hartford City was frequented by several Native American tribes, including the Miami, Delaware Lenape, and Potawatomi. While no permanent Native settlements are known to have existed at the future city site, Miami and Delaware peoples lived nearby on the Godfroy Reserve in northeastern Blackford County until increasing white settlement prompted their removal westward around 1839.

The first known non-Native settler in the area was Benjamin Reasoner, who arrived in 1831 and returned the following year with his family to establish a homestead in what later became Licking Township. Additional settlers arrived throughout the 1830s, including Andrew Boggs, John Grimes, George and Joseph Atkinson, Jacob Slater, and Robert Stewart. As settlement increased, the Indiana General Assembly created Blackford County in 1837, and the county was formally organized in June 1839. Named for Isaac Newton Blackford, the county held its first election in a settler's log cabin in the village of Hartford after Governor David Wallace appointed Nicolas Friend as acting sheriff. The newly elected county commissioners soon designated Hartford as the county seat and began planning infrastructure projects, including a road connecting the community with Portland, Indiana. Located near Lick Creek, Hartford initially consisted of only a handful of log cabins but quickly emerged as the county's governmental and commercial center. By the early 1840s, it was home to seven pioneer families and served as the focal point of settlement in the county.

As Hartford continued to grow, residents sought municipal self-government. A census conducted in May 1857 recorded 311 residents in 51 families, and voters approved incorporation as a town on September 28, 1857, by a vote of 35 to 18. The Blackford County commissioners formally incorporated Hartford on December 7, 1857, establishing a local government headed by an elected clerk-treasurer and town council.

The community was designated as the county seat of Blackford County when that county was created in 1837, and it was incorporated in 1867. During the last half of the 19th century, East Central Indiana consisted mostly of rural farming communities, including Hartford City. The town's population did not exceed 2,000 until after 1887, when the region began to grow because of the Indiana Gas Boom.

=== Gas Boom and industrial growth ===
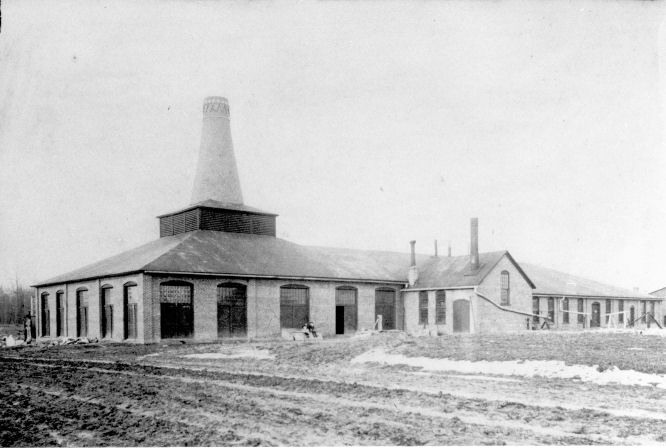
Hartford City's Sneath Glass factory in 1895

The arrival of railroads in the late nineteenth century connected Hartford City to regional markets and contributed to its economic development. By the 1880s, the city was served by multiple rail lines, improving transportation for passengers and freight and making the community more attractive to industry.

The discovery of natural gas in east-central Indiana transformed Hartford City from a small county-seat town into a regional industrial center. Following the discovery of natural gas in Blackford County in 1887, the city became part of the Indiana Gas Boom. Abundant supplies of inexpensive fuel attracted manufacturers to the area, resulting in a period of rapid economic and population growth. Numerous companies established operations in the city during the following decade, including the Hartford City Glass Company, Sneath Glass Company, Hartford City Paper Company, Utility Paper Company, and Congress Cycle Company. The city's population increased from 2,287 in 1890 to 5,912 in 1900.

Glass manufacturing became the city's dominant industry. The Hartford City Glass Company, founded in 1890, was among the three largest window glass manufacturers in the United States and employed as many as 600 workers. By 1902, Hartford City was home to eight glass factories, including Hartford City Glass, Sneath Glass, Johnston Glass, and several bottle and tableware manufacturers. The industry also attracted skilled immigrant workers, particularly from Belgium, who formed a significant portion of the city's population during the 1890s.

The rapid growth of the Gas Boom era resulted in significant civic and commercial development. The Blackford County Courthouse was completed in 1894, replacing the county's earlier courthouse, while a municipal waterworks system and other public improvements were constructed to accommodate the city's expanding population. By 1901, state inspectors recorded fifteen manufacturing establishments in Hartford City employing more than 1,000 workers, with glass factories accounting for the largest share of industrial employment. Although local natural gas supplies declined during the early twentieth century, several major industries remained in operation after the boom ended, allowing Hartford City to retain an important manufacturing base.

=== After the Gas Boom ===
Although the decline of local natural gas supplies ended Hartford City's period of rapid growth, the city retained much of its industrial base. Unlike many smaller communities that emerged during the Indiana Gas Boom, Hartford City remained a regional manufacturing center after the depletion of local gas reserves. Many of the major employers created by the boom, continued operations well into the 1950s and beyond, while many residents found employment in nearby manufacturing centers such as Muncie, Marion, and Anderson.

During the 1920s, the Overhead Door Corporation relocated its headquarters and manufacturing operations to Hartford City, becoming one of the city's largest employers, and in 1955 3M acquired the former Hartford City Paper plant and established a manufacturing facility in the city. Manufacturing remained the foundation of the local economy even after WWll.

Like many communities in the Rust Belt, Hartford City experienced economic challenges during the late twentieth century as manufacturing employment declined. Overhead Door moved its headquarters to Texas in 1965 and later completely left Hartford City by 2000, while broader industrial restructuring contributed to population decline. Despite these challenges, Hartford City has remained the county seat and principal commercial center of Blackford County.

== Geography ==
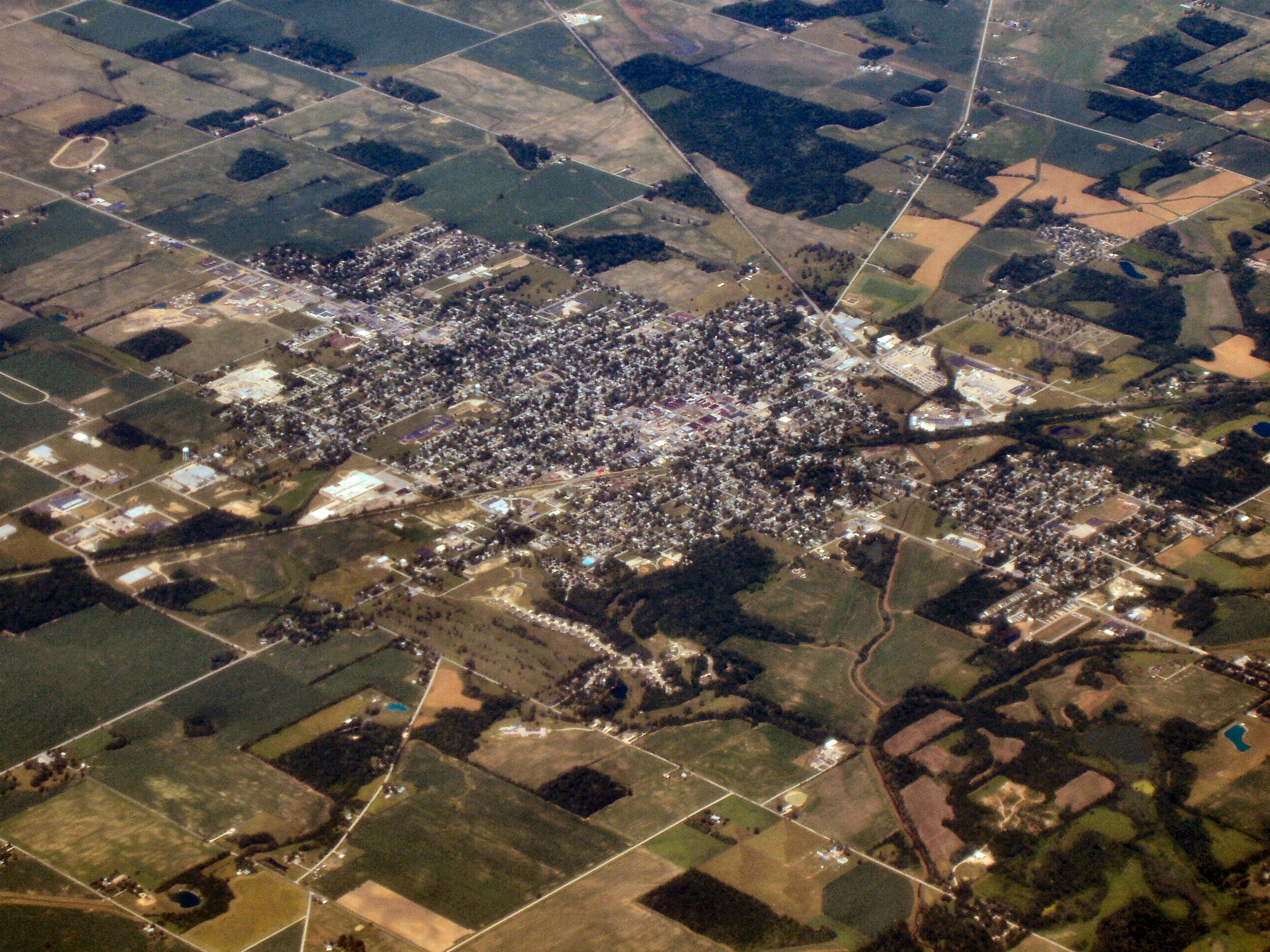
Hartford City from the air, looking northeast.

Hartford City sits on top of former natural gas fields. The area also has limestone formed from silt and mud deposits of an ancient sea. The land is flat from the effect of a prehistoric glacier, and the soil is excellent for farming. According to the 2010 census, Hartford City has a total area of 3.901 square miles (10.10 km^{2}), of which 3.88 square miles (10.05 km^{2}) (or 99.46%) is land and 0.021 square miles (0.05 km^{2}) (or 0.54%) is water.

=== Major highways ===
- Indiana State Road 3
- Indiana State Road 26
- Interstate 69 (less than 10 miles (16 km) west of city)

=== Adjacent cities ===
- Upland − about 8 highway miles west
- Montpelier − about 12 highway miles northeast
- Dunkirk − about 14 highway miles southeast
- Muncie − about 19 highway miles south
- Marion − about 23 highway miles northwest

=== Climate ===
Hartford City has a typical Midwestern humid continental seasonal climate. There are four distinct seasons, with winters being cold with moderate snowfall, while summers can be warm and humid. The highest average temperature is in July at 84 °F (29 °C), while the lowest average temperature is in January at 18 °F (−8 °C). However, summer temperatures can top 90 °F (32 °C), and winter temperatures can drop below 0 °F (−18 °C). Average monthly precipitation ranges from about 2 to 4 inches (5.1 to 10.2 centimetres), with the heaviest occurring during June, July, and August. The highest recorded temperature was 104 °F (40 °C) on June 29, 2012, and the lowest recorded temperature was −26.0 °F (−32.2 °C) on January 19, 1994.

Climate data for Hartford City, Indiana (1991–2020 normals, extremes 1959–present)
Month	Jan	Feb	Mar	Apr	May	Jun	Jul	Aug	Sep	Oct	Nov	Dec	Year
Record high °F (°C)	65 (18)	73 (23)	85 (29)	87 (31)	94 (34)	104 (40)	102 (39)	98 (37)	97 (36)	91 (33)	79 (26)	71 (22)	104 (40)
Mean maximum °F (°C)	56.1 (13.4)	59.4 (15.2)	70.9 (21.6)	80.1 (26.7)	87.3 (30.7)	91.7 (33.2)	92.6 (33.7)	90.8 (32.7)	89.3 (31.8)	83.0 (28.3)	69.6 (20.9)	59.1 (15.1)	93.8 (34.3)
Mean daily maximum °F (°C)	33.1 (0.6)	37.1 (2.8)	47.9 (8.8)	61.4 (16.3)	71.9 (22.2)	80.4 (26.9)	83.2 (28.4)	81.5 (27.5)	76.3 (24.6)	64.4 (18.0)	50.0 (10.0)	38.1 (3.4)	60.4 (15.8)
Daily mean °F (°C)	26.0 (−3.3)	29.2 (−1.6)	39.0 (3.9)	51.0 (10.6)	61.9 (16.6)	70.9 (21.6)	73.6 (23.1)	71.7 (22.1)	65.5 (18.6)	54.2 (12.3)	41.8 (5.4)	31.3 (−0.4)	51.3 (10.7)
Mean daily minimum °F (°C)	18.9 (−7.3)	21.3 (−5.9)	30.2 (−1.0)	40.7 (4.8)	51.9 (11.1)	61.4 (16.3)	64.0 (17.8)	61.9 (16.6)	54.7 (12.6)	43.9 (6.6)	33.6 (0.9)	24.5 (−4.2)	42.2 (5.7)
Mean minimum °F (°C)	−4.6 (−20.3)	−0.2 (−17.9)	11.6 (−11.3)	24.9 (−3.9)	36.2 (2.3)	47.4 (8.6)	52.7 (11.5)	50.3 (10.2)	40.5 (4.7)	29.1 (−1.6)	18.2 (−7.7)	5.1 (−14.9)	−7.0 (−21.7)
Record low °F (°C)	−26 (−32)	−17 (−27)	−10 (−23)	8 (−13)	26 (−3)	37 (3)	45 (7)	35 (2)	29 (−2)	19 (−7)	3 (−16)	−22 (−30)	−26 (−32)
Average precipitation inches (mm)	2.67 (68)	2.35 (60)	3.31 (84)	3.89 (99)	4.24 (108)	4.43 (113)	4.20 (107)	4.33 (110)	3.48 (88)	2.89 (73)	3.28 (83)	2.67 (68)	41.74 (1,060)
Average snowfall inches (cm)	9.0 (23)	8.2 (21)	5.0 (13)	0.6 (1.5)	0.0 (0.0)	0.0 (0.0)	0.0 (0.0)	0.0 (0.0)	0.0 (0.0)	0.2 (0.51)	2.0 (5.1)	7.2 (18)	32.2 (82)
Average precipitation days (≥ 0.01 in)	12.6	10.5	11.5	11.7	12.8	11.8	9.6	9.2	7.9	9.7	10.5	12.3	129.5
Average snowy days (≥ 0.1 in)	9.3	7.9	3.9	0.8	0.0	0.0	0.0	0.0	0.0	0.1	1.8	7.0	30.8
Source: NOAA

== Demographics ==
Historical population
Census	Pop.	Note	%±
1850	250		—
1860	618	(Note: No separately-returned population figure was recorded for Hartford City in 1860.)	147.2%
1870	878		42.1%
1880	1,470		67.4%
1890	2,287		55.6%
1900	5,912		158.5%
1910	6,187		4.7%
1920	6,183		−0.1%
1930	6,613		7.0%
1940	6,946		5.0%
1950	7,253		4.4%
1960	8,053		11.0%
1970	8,207		1.9%
1980	7,622		−7.1%
1990	6,960		−8.7%
2000	6,928		−0.5%
2010	6,220		−10.2%
2020	6,086		−2.2%
2025 (est.)	5,944		−2.3%
US Decennial Census

=== 2020 census ===
As of the 2020 census, Hartford City had a population of 6,086. The median age was 41.8 years. 23.3% of residents were under the age of 18 and 20.4% of residents were 65 years of age or older. For every 100 females there were 93.8 males, and for every 100 females age 18 and over there were 90.6 males age 18 and over.

100.0% of residents lived in urban areas, while 0.0% lived in rural areas.

There were 2,652 households in Hartford City, of which 27.6% had children under the age of 18 living in them. Of all households, 39.6% were married-couple households, 20.7% were households with a male householder and no spouse or partner present, and 32.0% were households with a female householder and no spouse or partner present. About 36.3% of all households were made up of individuals and 18.1% had someone living alone who was 65 years of age or older.

There were 3,038 housing units, of which 12.7% were vacant. The homeowner vacancy rate was 3.5% and the rental vacancy rate was 9.9%.

Racial composition as of the 2020 census
Race	Number	Percent
White	5,638	92.6%
Black or African American	40	0.7%
American Indian and Alaska Native	25	0.4%
Asian	6	0.1%
Native Hawaiian and Other Pacific Islander	0	0.0%
Some other race	76	1.2%
Two or more races	301	4.9%
Hispanic or Latino (of any race)	154	2.5%

=== 2010 census ===
As of the 2010 United States census, there were 6,220 people, 2,666 households, and 1,691 families in the city. The population density was 1,603.1 inhabitants per square mile (619.0/km^{2}). There were 3,158 housing units at an average density of 813.9 per square mile (314.2/km^{2}). The racial makeup of the city was 97.3% White, 0.3% African American, 0.2% Native American, 0.1% Asian, 0.1% Pacific Islander, 0.4% from other races, and 1.7% from two or more races. Hispanic or Latino of any race were 1.2% of the population.

There were 2,666 households, of which 30.3% had children under the age of 18 living with them, 44.7% were married couples living together, 12.3% had a female householder with no husband present, 6.4% had a male householder with no wife present, and 36.6% were non-families. 32.0% of all households were made up of individuals, and 15.4% had someone living alone who was 65 years of age or older. The average household size was 2.32 and the average family size was 2.86.

The median age in the city was 41.3 years. 23.1% of residents were under the age of 18; 8.4% were between the ages of 18 and 24; 23.4% were from 25 to 44; 26.7% were from 45 to 64; and 18.4% were 65 years of age or older. The gender makeup of the city was 47.6% male and 52.4% female.

=== 2000 census ===
As of the 2000 United States census, there were 6,928 people, 2,918 households, and 1,943 families in the city. The population density was 1,861.7 inhabitants per square mile (718.8/km^{2}). There were 3,156 housing units at an average density of 848.1 per square mile (327.5/km^{2}). The racial makeup of the city was 98.34% White, 0.09% African American, 0.38% Native American, 0.20% Asian, 0.22% from other races, and 0.78% from two or more races. Hispanic or Latino of any race were 0.61% of the population.

There were 2,918 households, out of which 30.5% had children under the age of 18 living with them, 50.8% were married couples living together, 12.1% had a female householder with no husband present, and 33.4% were non-families. 29.7% of all households were made up of individuals, and 13.9% had someone living alone who was 65 years of age or older. The average household size was 2.36 and the average family size was 2.89.

The city population contained 25.0% under the age of 18, 7.5% from 18 to 24, 27.7% from 25 to 44, 22.6% from 45 to 64, and 17.2% who were 65 years of age or older. The median age was 38 years. For every 100 females, there were 89.5 males. For every 100 females age 18 and over, there were 85.4 males.

The median income for a household in the city was $31,531, and the median income for a family was $39,654. Males had a median income of $29,257 versus $20,600 for females. The per capita income for the city was $15,596. About 7.3% of families and 10.4% of the population were below the poverty line, including 15.8% of those under age 18 and 7.7% of those age 65 or over.

== Economy ==
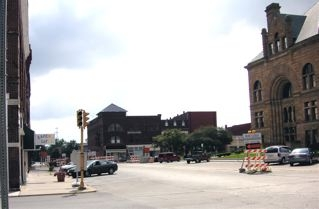
Downtown Hartford City

About 11 percent of Hartford City's male workers, and 9 percent of female workers, are employed in the transportation equipment industry. This makes the transportation equipment industry the most important provider of jobs for the city, although there are no auto parts plants located in the county. The decline of the auto industry has forced Hartford City to be less of a "bedroom community" reliant on jobs relating to automobile parts manufacturing in nearby cities, and more focused on developing businesses within the city. Currently, there are six businesses located in Hartford City that employ between 100 and 350 people, and none with more than 350 employees. Those six companies (in descending order of employees) are 3M Company, Petoskey Plastic, BRC Rubber Group, Inc., Blackford Community Hospital, and New Indy Paper Mill. In addition, there are nearly twenty more local entities with 25 to 100 employees. Agriculture also influences the town. Although they do not live in the city limits, farm families are involved with the local schools, parks, and social activities – and are consumers of the products of local merchants.

== Culture ==
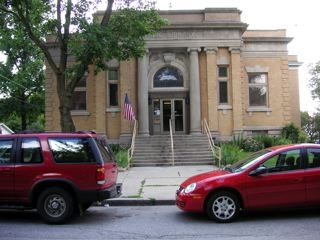
Hartford City's Carnegie Library

The 2009 official web site of Hartford City shows three main pictures: Civil War re-enactors, a basketball player, and the courthouse, illustrating what is important to the city and its culture. Hartford City's town square is a "living museum", and is listed on the National Register of Historic Places as the Hartford City Courthouse Square Historic District. Many of the buildings were built during the gas boom in the late 19th century, and are examples of architectural styles used at that time, including Romanesque Revival, Commercial Italianate, Renaissance Revival, and Queen Anne. The Blackford County Courthouse and First Presbyterian Church are also listed on the National Register of Historic Places.

Adding to the historical atmosphere, the courthouse lawn contains war monuments on each corner. The town has a small museum and library housed in the Blackford County Historical Society building. The city's main public library, the Hartford City Public Library, is a Carnegie library that began with funding from Andrew Carnegie in 1903.

=== Recreation ===
Sports and recreation are important to the community. The city Parks Department maintains four parks and a public swimming pool. There are four golf courses within ten miles (16 km) from Hartford City, and ten more are within 20 miles (32 km). The city has some small lakes and reservoirs available for fishing, such as Lake Placid and the lakes of the nearby Shamrock Lakes area. A larger lake (over 2,600 acres (11 km^{2})) is Salamonie Lake, with boating, fishing, and swimming, is located 29 miles (47 km) northwest of Hartford City. State Parks nearby include Ouabache, Mounds, and Summit Lake. For those willing to drive north for about 90 minutes, Pokagon State Park is located on Lake James and Snow Lake. This park features campgrounds, hiking trails, a beach, the Potawatomi Inn, and a toboggan track.

Hartford City sports leagues include baseball, softball, soccer, and football. Indiana is known for its high school basketball, and Hartford City high schools have had their share of success in the state basketball tournament. Hartford City High School won 14 sectional and 3 regional tournaments in about 60 years of action. Hartford City High was consolidated into Blackford High School in 1969, and Blackford has won 10 sectionals. The Blackford High School gym seats 4,000 for a town with a population of less than 7,000. Hartford City's Blackford High School football team has also had some tournament success, winning the Indiana state 2A football championship in 1974-75 and 1979-80 – both teams were undefeated.

=== Agriculture ===
Agriculture has a strong influence on Hartford City's culture. The main crops in the area are soybeans and corn. Some wheat and hay are also grown. The Indiana Farm Bureau office for Blackford County is located in Hartford City. 4-H, a youth organization associated with the U.S. Department of Agriculture has a strong presence. The annual county 4-H fair is held in June, and features a rodeo, horse show, dog show, livestock, and carnival. The week-long event includes a mile-long parade with a marching band.

== Government ==
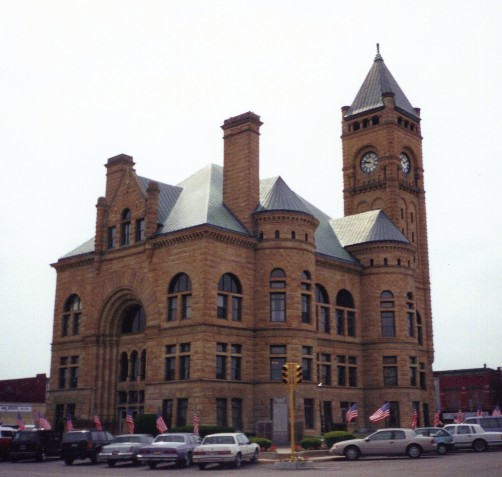
The Blackford County courthouse is at the center of Hartford City's town square.

The government consists of a mayor and a city council. The mayor is elected in citywide vote. The city council consists of five members with four elected from individual districts and one elected at-large. The current members of city council are:

- Tony Scaggs (R, AL)
- Michael Wolfe (R, 1st)
- Dustin George (R, 2nd)
- Ron Parrott (R, 3rd)
- Ron Dudelston (R, 4th)

== Religion ==
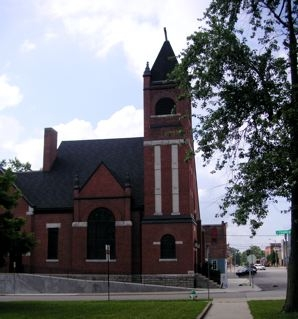
Hartford City's Presbyterian Church

The United Methodist Church is the city's largest congregation; other churches include Catholic, Church of the Nazarene, Christian, Lutheran, Wesleyan, Baptist, and Presbyterian. The Methodists, and then the Presbyterians, were the first to build churches in town. The First Presbyterian Church and the Christian Church buildings were built during the Gas Boom in the 1890s.

== Media ==
The local daily (except Sunday) newspaper is the News Times, and it is also available from its web site. Hartford City has a history of difficulty supporting two newspapers, and the News Times can trace its lineage back to the Hartford City News and the Hartford City Times. During the Gas Boom, the town had two weekly and two daily newspapers: Hartford City Telegram, The Hartford City Times, Hartford City Evening News, and The Daily Times.

There are at least fourteen radio stations that send moderate to very strong signals to the Hartford City area. These stations are typically located nearby, or they have an exceptional signal, such as Fort Wayne's 50,000 watt WOWO AM station. The two local radio stations are WMXQ and WHCI, both FM stations.

Indianapolis television stations such as WTTV, WRTV, WISH-TV, WTHR, and others, reach the antennas of households in Hartford City. Stations located near Hartford City include Tipton's WJSJ-CD, Marion's WSOT-LD, and Muncie's WIPB.

== Education ==
The state of Indiana has many college options available, including well-known universities such as Ball State University, Indiana University, Purdue, and Notre Dame. The state also has one of the largest private boarding high schools, the Culver Academies.

=== Higher education ===
Hartford City has at least four universities located within 21 miles (34 km) of town. Ball State University is the largest and most well known, and is about 18 miles (29 km) away in Muncie, Indiana. (Ball State is named for the Ball brothers, who made much of their fortune with the Ball Corporation in the same Indiana Gas Boom that boosted Hartford City.) Muncie is also home to Ivy Tech State College-East Central. Private school Indiana Wesleyan University is about 21 miles (34 km) away, in Marion, Indiana. Another private school, Taylor University, is about 7 miles (11 km) away in Upland. Its location in Upland dates from 1893, attributed to the population boom in the area at the time, and is another example of the impact of the Indiana Gas Boom.

=== Primary and secondary schools ===
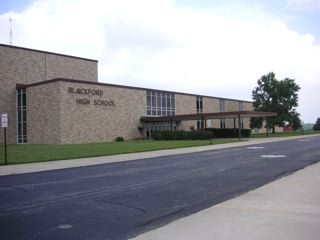
Hartford City's Blackford High School

Blackford High School is located on the north side of Hartford City, and it has served the entire county since 1969. Enrollment for the 2008–2009 school year is 702 students, and 41 teachers are listed on the school roster. Hartford City High School was the town's high school prior to the 1969 consolidation of Montpelier High School.

Hartford City Middle School is located on the town's west side, within easy walking distance from Sigma Phi Gamma Park. Students from grades 6 through 8 attend the middle school, and 23 teachers are listed on the roster. Students for grades 3 through 5 attend Northside Elementary School, and grades K through 4 attend Southside Elementary School. Hartford City also has a private school – Saint John's Riedman Memorial School is a private Catholic elementary school with approximately 60 students.

== Transportation ==
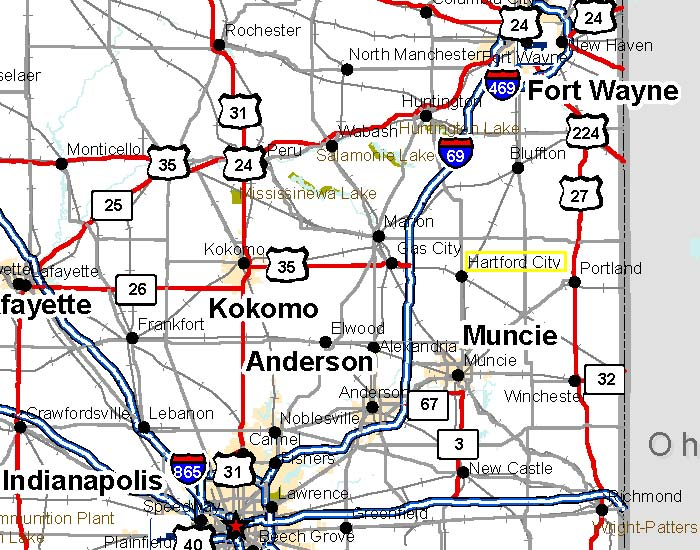
East Central Indiana

Hartford City's early transportation advantage came from the two railroad lines that crossed in the city, running north–south and east–west. The east–west line is now out of service as of 2008, but the north–south line is still in service. Both are operated by Norfolk Southern. Hartford City also has a good highway system. Indiana State Road 3 runs north–south through the city, known as Walnut Street. Indiana State Road 26 runs east–west through the city, known as Washington Street. Indiana State Road 22 used to run concurrently with State Road 26 through Hartford City, but that segment was decommissioned in the 1970s.

Although Interstate 69 does not run through Hartford City or Blackford County, it is less than 10 miles (16 km) away and a convenient way to drive to Fort Wayne or Indianapolis. From Hartford City, drive west on State Road 26 to reach Interstate 69. Driving north from Indianapolis, the State Road 26 exit is number 255. The Interstate's northbound exit 259, at Upland, is an easy route to travel to the north side of Hartford City. Some small airports are located near Hartford City, and larger airports in Fort Wayne and Indianapolis offer commercial flights.

== Notable people ==
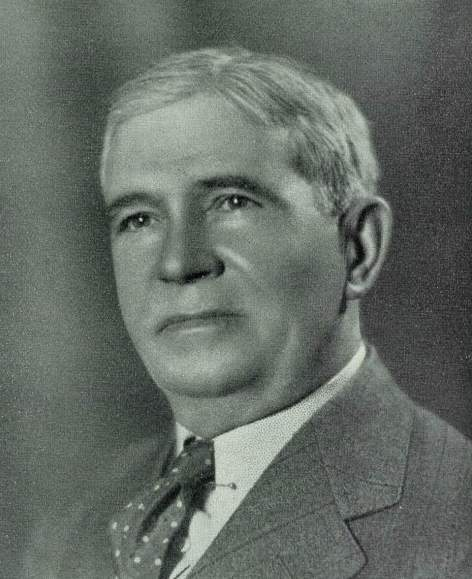
Edward Everett Cox, founder of Hartford City's first newspaper.

- Edward Everett Cox, newspaper publisher
- Henry Crimmel, glassmaker
- David C. Ford, lawyer and member of the Indiana Senate
- Edwin H. Ford, founder of the Ford Meter Box Company and inventor of the meter box.
- Kevin A. Ford, retired United States Air Force Colonel and NASA astronaut.
- Larry Monroe, radio personality
- Jay H. Neff, newspaper publisher and Mayor of Kansas City, Missouri from 1904 - 1906.
- George Washington Steele, U.S. representative from Indiana.
- Maurice Clifford Townsend, Indiana governor
- Wayne Townsend, member of the Indiana Senate.
- Cheryl Willman, cancer researcher and executive director of Mayo Clinic Cancer Programs at the Mayo Clinic Comprehensive Cancer Center.

== See also ==
- Van Cleve Opera House, a former opera house in Hartford City
- National Register of Historic Places listings in Blackford County, Indiana
