= Timeline of Blackford County, Indiana =

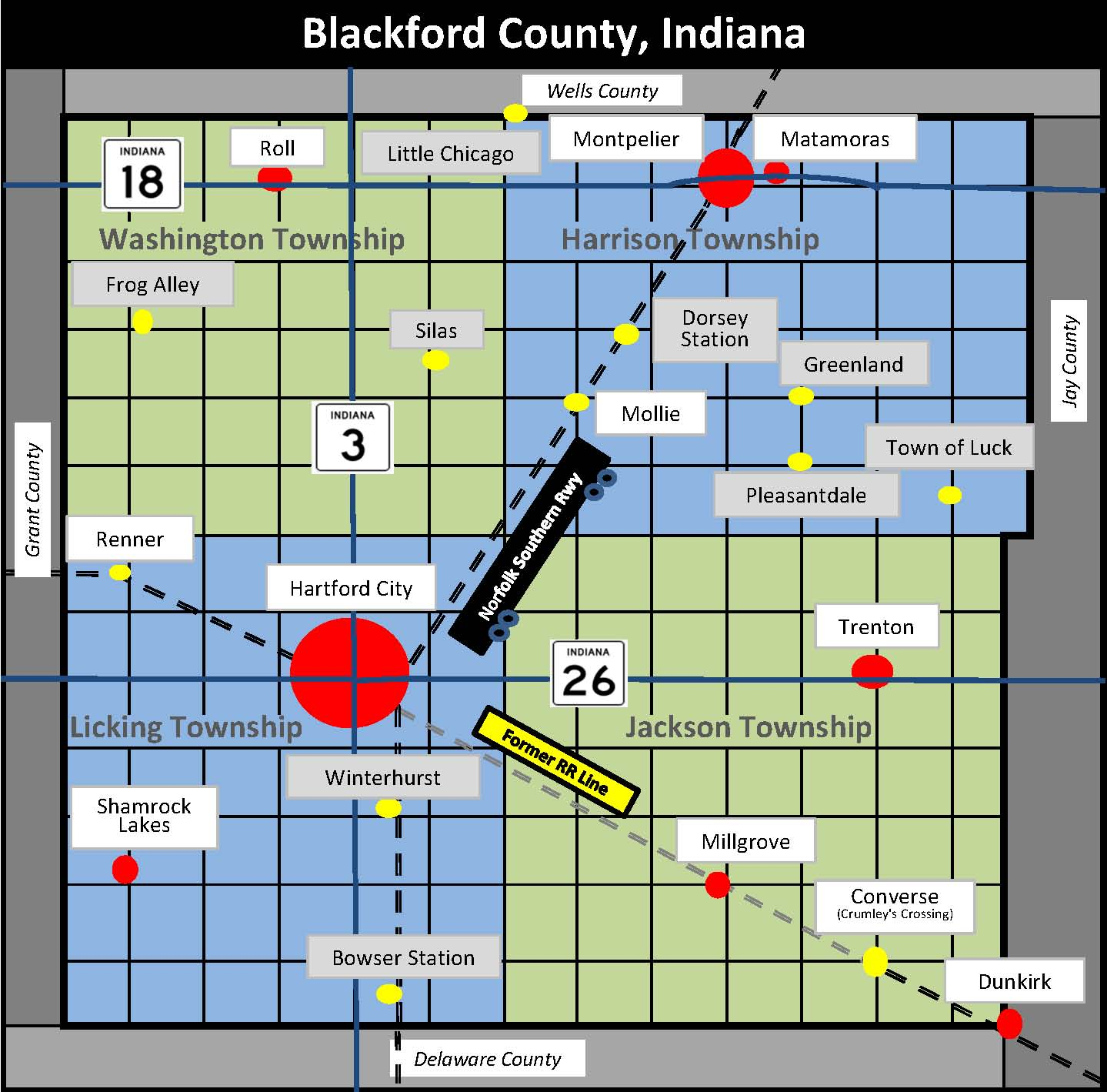
Image map of Blackford County and communities that either existed or still exist. Each feature or white label is linked to its article.

This is a timeline and interactive map of Blackford County, Indiana. The timeline (below) lists important events in Blackford County history. An adjacent (right) interactive map contains links to various locations around the county.

The county was creating by splitting off the western section of Jay County, and is named after Judge Isaac Blackford. Its county seat is Hartford City, Indiana, which was briefly a boomtown because of the discovery of natural gas. Because of the natural gas and oil fields elsewhere in the county, the glassmaking industry thrived for about 30 years. Later in the 20th century, Hartford City was the national headquarters for Overhead Door Corporation for about 40 years.

== 19th century ==
=== 1800s ===
- 1800 July 4 – Indiana Territory created from lands of Northwest Territory.

=== 1810s ===
- 1816 December 11 – Indiana is admitted to United States as the 19th U.S. state.
- 1818 October 6 – Treaty of St. Mary's gives land along Salamonie River (in future Jay and Blackford Counties) to Miami Indian Chief François Godfroy (Palaanswa), and tribal members on this reservation are considered first settlers in future Blackford County.
- 1819 December – Vacant land that would become Jay, Blackford, Wells, Adams, and Allen counties attached to Randolph County for judicial purposes.

=== 1820s ===
- 1820 August – Randolph County commissioners give name of Wayne Township to land that would become Jay, Blackford, Wells, Adams, and Allen counties.

=== 1830s ===
- 1831 July 9 – Benjamin Reasoner Sr. enters future Blackford County in the southwest corner of what would become Licking Township, near Lick Creek, and starts farm.
- 1832 – John Blount settles in the northeast corner of future Blackford County. Blackford County's oldest community, Matamoras, would begin on the Blount property along the Salamonie River.
- 1833 January 4 – Mary Reasoner, first non-native child of Anglo heritage born in future Blackford County, born on this day. She was the third child of Peter Reasoner.
- 1835 January 5 – Randolph County commissioners assign name of Salamonie Township to land that would become Jay and Blackford counties.
- 1835 February 7 –Indiana General Assembly passes act that lays out 14 counties, including Jay County (which contained the future Blackford County at that time).
- 1836 January 30 – Indiana General Assembly passes act that, effective March 1, "the county of Jay shall enjoy all the rights and jurisdiction which, to separate and independent counties, do or may properly belong." At that time, future Blackford County was part of Jay County.
- 1836 August – Jay County holds elections. Future Blackford County portion of Jay County called Lick Creek Township.
- 1836–37 – Settlers from Vermont, led by Abel Baldwin, establish community along Salamonie River in what would become Blackford County's Harrison Township. Community is named Montpelier in honor of the capital of their native state.
- 1837 September 5 – Community of Montpelier platted.
- 1838 February 15 – An "act for the formation of the county of Blackford" approved, and commissioners named to decide location of county seat.
- 1838 April 2 – Effective date of act that formed Blackford County.
- 1839 January 29 – Second act approved for the creation of Blackford County, effective on the same (January 29) day, and new set of commissioners named to decide location of county seat.
- 1839 June – Blackford County finally organized after Governor David Wallace appoints a sheriff. Elections for county officers were held at the log cabin home of Andrew Boggs.

=== 1840s ===
- 1840 February 12 – Blackford County's first Post Office established in Montpelier.
- 1840 February 24 – Legislature appoints a third set of commissioners to locate Blackford County's county seat.
- 1841 February 4 – Legislature appoints a fourth set of commissioners to locate Blackford County's county seat.
- 1841 – After considerable debate, Blackford County commissioners determine that Hartford (City) will be county seat, and construction begins on a courthouse. (Hartford City was originally called "Hartford", but later changed to Hartford City when it was discovered that another Hartford already existed in Indiana.)
- 1847 January – Community of Trenton "laid out" at a crossroads that include eventual Indiana State Road 26, one of the county's a major east–west highways.
- 1849 January 15 – First projected railroad in Blackford County, the Fort Wayne and Southern, chartered by state legislature. Because of financial difficulties, this railroad was the second to operate in the county.

=== 1850s ===
- 1854 August 4 – First postmaster appointed in Dundee. Because another Dundee existed in Henry County, the community eventually became known as Roll.
- 1857 December 7 – Hartford City incorporates as town.

=== 1860s ===
- 1865 – Trenton's Post Office established using name "Priam" because another Trenton existed in Indiana at that time.
- 1867 – The Union & Logansport Railway completed to Hartford. This is the first railroad to operate in Blackford County, running approximately east–west through the southern half of the county. In less than twenty years, this railroad became known as the Pittsburg, Cincinnati & St. Louis Railroad, and eventually became part of the Pennsylvania Railroad system.
- 1867 – Millgrove laid out along railroad tracks of Union & Logansport Railway in Jackson Township.

=== 1870s ===
- 1870 – Montpelier incorporates as a town.
- 1870 September 12 – Fort Wayne, Cincinnati & Louisville Railroad runs first train from Fort Wayne to Muncie, running north–south through Montpelier and Hartford City in Blackford County. Although this was Blackford County's first proposed railroad, it was the second railroad to operate in the county.
- 1877 April 13 – Land donated for Independence Rural School in Washington Township's Frog Alley. The area became known as Frog Alley because of the swampy condition around the school.

=== 1880s ===
- 1887 Spring – Hartford City Gas and Oil Company drills successful natural gas well in Hartford City. This begins Blackford County's participation in the Indiana Gas Boom, as the Trenton Gas Field includes most of Blackford County.
- 1888 – Community of Mollie, a railroad stop in Harrison Township, opens Mollie Post Office. Located near oil fields, Mollie thrives during the Indiana Gas Boom.

=== 1890s ===
- 1890 – Blackford County's first successful oil well, located on the south side of Montpelier, begins producing. Oil is found throughout most of Harrison Township, and portions of Washington Township.
- 1891 – Hartford City Glass Company, the first glass factory in Blackford County, begins manufacturing window glass. The company would be purchased by American Window Glass Company in 1899.
- 1893 July 9 – First Presbyterian Church dedicated in Hartford City. This building would eventually be added to the National Register of Historic Places.
- 1894 January 9 – Hotel Ingram opens for business in Hartford City. This hotel building still stands, and is now part of the Hartford City Courthouse Square Historic District.
- 1894 April – Hartford City voters approve a city charter, and town incorporates as a city in May.
- 1894 August 8 – Hartford City's economic boom continued as workers were finishing the roof on the new courthouse. At least three hundred men were expected to be necessary to construct the new street railway, waterworks, Sneath Glass plant, and the belt railway. Improvements to the streets were also being considered.
- 1894 – Magnificent new Blackford County Courthouse built in Hartford City during peak of Gas Boom. This building would eventually be added to the National Register of Historic Places.

== 20th century ==
=== 1900s ===
- 1901 – Gas Boom companies American Window Glass and Sneath Glass Company are biggest manufacturers in county, accounting for over 600 jobs.
- 1903 October 31 – Community of Silas is "grieving" over the loss of its general store (once owned by Silas Rayl), believing that Silas "will be no more".
- 1905 – Hartford City builds a brick high school in response to need and difficulties with fires. The school was used for over 60 years.
- 1907 – Mollie's Post Office discontinued.
- 1907 – Trenton's Priam Post Office discontinued.
- 1908 – New technology causes numerous skilled glass workers in Hartford City to lose their jobs producing window glass.
- 1908 – New public library built in Montpelier with the help of a donation from Andrew Carnegie. This building would eventually be added to the National Register of Historic Places.

=== 1910s ===
- 1911 – Millgrove's glass factory closed – "a severe blow to Millgrove".
- 1913 March 25 – Flooding along Salamonie River caused city of Montpelier to be without electricity, and the river swelled to over one mile wide.
- 1917 – New two-story high school constructed in Roll.

=== 1920s ===
- 1923 – Overhead Door Corporation moves headquarters to Hartford City, and establishes garage door manufacturing facility that will become a major employer for the community – employing as many as 515 people.

=== 1930s ===
- 1933 August 4 – John Dillinger gang robs First National Bank of Montpelier.
- 1938 – Gymnasium added to Roll High School.

=== 1940s ===
- 1945 July 8 –Sigma Phi Gamma Park dedicated in Hartford City's west side. This park is large enough to have a baseball diamond, football field, tennis court, and playground.

=== 1950s ===
- 1952 – Sneath Glass Company closed. This company was once one of Hartford City's largest employers in manufacturing.
- 1955 –3M Company purchases the Hartford City Paper Mill, and becomes a major employer in Hartford City.

=== 1960s ===
- 1962 – Last class graduates from Roll High School. School system becomes part of Montpelier Community Schools.
- 1965 – Overhead Door Corporation moves headquarters from Hartford City to Dallas, Texas.

=== 1970s ===
- 1970 October 25 – Blackford High School dedicated. New high school opened for 1969–1970 school year, consolidating Montpelier and Hartford City High Schools.
- 1973 May 21 – Shamrock Lakes incorporates as a town in Licking Township.
- 1974 Fall – Undefeated Blackford High School wins state high school AA football championship.
- 1978 January 26 – Great Blizzard of 1978 covers Blackford County in deep snow.
- 1979 Fall – Blackford High School wins its second state high school AA football championship.

=== 1980s ===
- 1985 May 21 – Overhead Door Corporation cuts back operations at their original manufacturing plant in Hartford City. The plant would be closed in 2000.

=== 1990s ===
- 1993 – Hartford City and Indiana University golfer Erika Wicoff is Big Ten Freshman of the Year and Player of the Year. Wicoff eventually becomes a professional golfer.

== 21st century ==
=== 2000s ===
- 2008 June 21 – Surface Transportation Board rules that Norfolk Southern Railway Company can abandon an 8.6-mile section of railroad line in Blackford County.
- 2009 August 28 – Space Shuttle Discovery blasts off with Blackford High School graduate Kevin A. Ford as pilot.
