= History of Hartford City, Indiana =

Hartford City, Indiana
- City
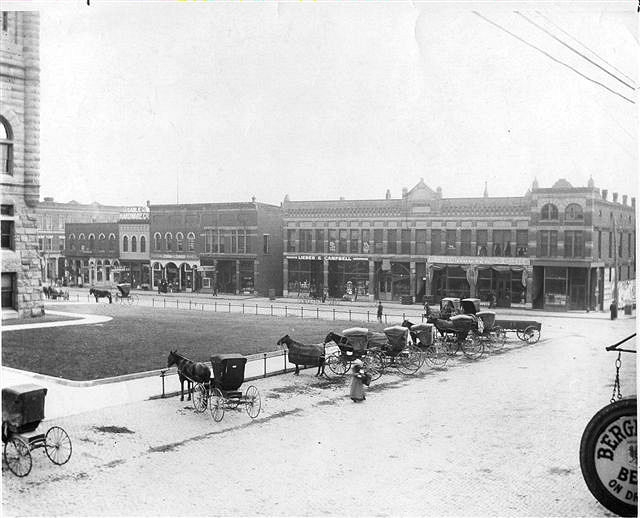
- Hartford City courthouse square in 1908

- Location in the state of Indiana
- Coordinates: 40°27′09″N 85°22′10″W
- Country: United States
- State: Indiana
- County: Blackford
- Officially named: 1839
- Incorporated (town): 1857
- Incorporated (city): 1894
- Website: (Historical Society) http://www.bchs-in.org/

Hartford City, Indiana, began in the late 1830s as a few log cabins clustered near a creek. The community became the county seat of Blackford County. Located in the north east-central portion of the state, the small farming community experienced a 15-year "boom" beginning in the late 1880s caused by the discovery of natural gas. The Indiana Gas Boom caused the community to transition from an agricultural economy to one that also included manufacturing. During the 1890s, Hartford City was the home of the nation's largest window glass company (Hartford City Glass Company) and the nation's largest producer of lantern globes (Sneath Glass Company).

The phenomenal growth ended after the boom, but the city was able to retain much of its workforce, as some of the glass factories and paper mills continued operations within the city. Jobs relating to the new automobile industry also became available in nearby cities. In the first half of the 20th century, Hartford City was able to attract several new manufacturers that became cornerstones for employment within the town, including Overhead Door and 3M. The town's population declined in the 1970s and 1980s as the fortunes of the auto industry declined. Cutbacks at the Overhead Door plant, and later its closing, also contributed to the population decline.

As a reminder of the Gas Boom, the National Park Service of the United States Department of the Interior added the Hartford City Courthouse Square Historic District to the National Register of Historic Places on June 21, 2006—meaning the buildings and objects that contribute to the continuity of the district are worthy of preservation because of their historical and architectural significance. Individual buildings in Hartford City also recognized by the National Register of Historic Places include the Blackford County Courthouse and the First Presbyterian Church.

== Pre-Settlement ==
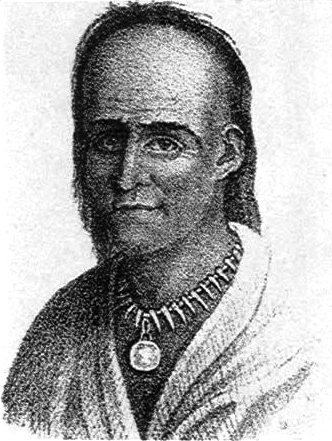
Little Turtle, a Miami Indian Chief

In the early 19th century, much of what would become the state of Indiana was still frequented by native Indian tribes. At least three tribes are almost certain to have visited the future Hartford City area during the 40 years before the town was settled, although there were no known permanent settlements in the immediate area. The three tribes are the Miami, Delaware, and Potawatomi. A fourth tribe, the Kickapoo, may have lived in the area before the 19th Century, and Hartford City has a Kickapoo Street named in that tribe's honor.

In the early 19th century, a settlement of the Munsee clan of the Delaware Indians was located about 19 miles south of the future Hartford City along the White River. Eventually, the future county to the south of Blackford County, Delaware County, was named after the Delaware Indians that lived there, and the city of Muncie derived its name from the Munsee clan.

The Miami tribe was the most powerful group of Indians in the region around the future Hartford City. Little Turtle (see picture) was the last great Miami warrior, dying in 1812. Francois Godfroy (he was half French) was one of the leaders of the area Miami Indians in the east central Indiana region after Indiana became a state, and he maintained a residence in what became northern Blackford County. The Miami and Delaware Indians are credited as being the first settlers of the Blackford County area, living about 9 miles (12 current highway miles) from the future Hartford City on the Godfroy Reserve after an 1818 treaty. The site is located in Blackford County's Harrison Township. Although the Godfroy Reserve was allotted to Miami Indian Chief Francois (a.k.a. Francis) Godfroy, Delaware Indians were also allowed to stay at the Reserve.

Members of the Potawatomi tribe may have occasionally strayed into the (future Hartford City) area during the early 19th century, but they were supposed to stay north of the Wabash River, which is about 30 miles north of present-day Hartford City. Around 1830, members of the Potawatomi tribe began visiting the area south of the Wabash River a bit too often, and were eventually fought by Miami warriors in what is now Upland, Indiana – which is about 8 miles from Hartford City. This fight, with knives and clubs as the main weapons, had no fatalities, and the result was the Potawatomi tribesmen returning to their lands north of the Wabash River.

== First settlements ==
Blackford County and Hartford City

The Indiana Territory was created in 1800, and a portion of that territory was used to grant Indiana statehood in 1816. In 1831, Benjamin Reasoner was the first known non-native to visit what would become Blackford County. He returned to the area in 1832 with his wife Mary and five of their children (plus son Peter's family), settling in what would become Blackford County's Licking Township. Peter Reasoner's third child, a daughter also named Mary, was the first non-native born in the county. Settlers began arriving in the future Blackford County shortly after the Reasoners during the 1830s. Other early settlers in the future Licking Township included Andrew Boggs, John Grimes, George and Joseph Atkinson, Jacob Slater, and Robert Stewart. John Grimes built the county's first water-powered grist mill on Big Lick Creek. Jay County was created in 1835, and a portion of that county was later split away to form Blackford County. Although Blackford County was created by the State Legislature in 1837, the county was not organized until 1839. The county is named after Judge Isaac Newton Blackford, a state Supreme Court judge from 1817 until 1855. Blackford County now consists of four townships, and Hartford City is located in Licking Township. As the county became organized and more settlers began arriving, the Godfroy Reservation tribe became more annoyed with the "white man", and moved west around 1839.

== Hartford ==
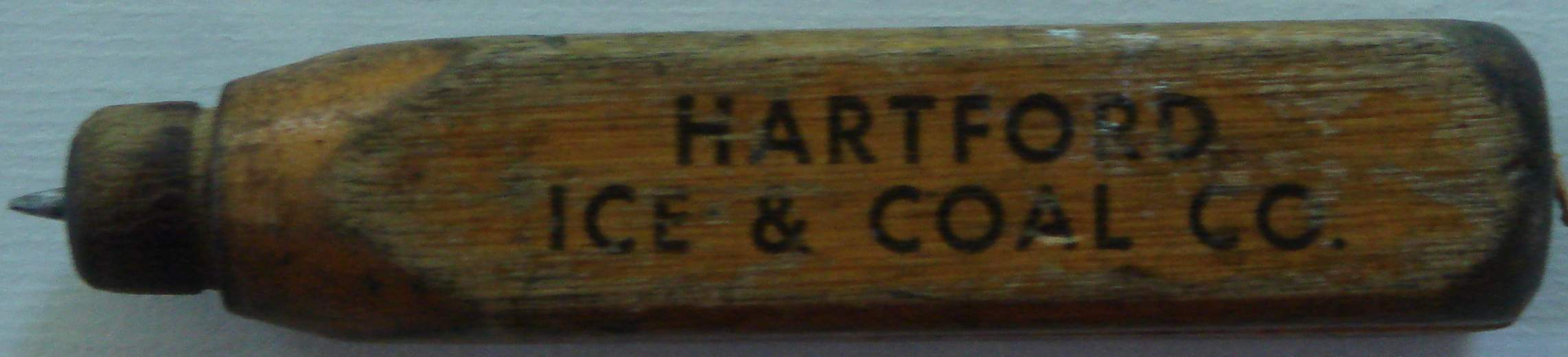

Originally, Hartford City was named Hartford. The site for the Blackford County seat was designated as Hartford in 1837, before the community had an official name and before the county was organized. The citizens of nearby Montpelier objected to this designation, but efforts to change the county seat were unsuccessful. Although the Montpelier community had existed longer, Licking Township (which contained the future Hartford City) had a slightly higher population. Some land donated to the county for the purpose of public buildings may have also influenced the decision. The county finally became organized in 1839, and the village became officially named Hartford. The community was located in the southwest part of the present day Hartford City, close to Lick Creek. The settlers found deer and wolves, but no Indians in the immediate vicinity of the community – although Indians had been living in the northeastern part of the county on the Godfroy Reserve, and were still living in adjacent Grant County.

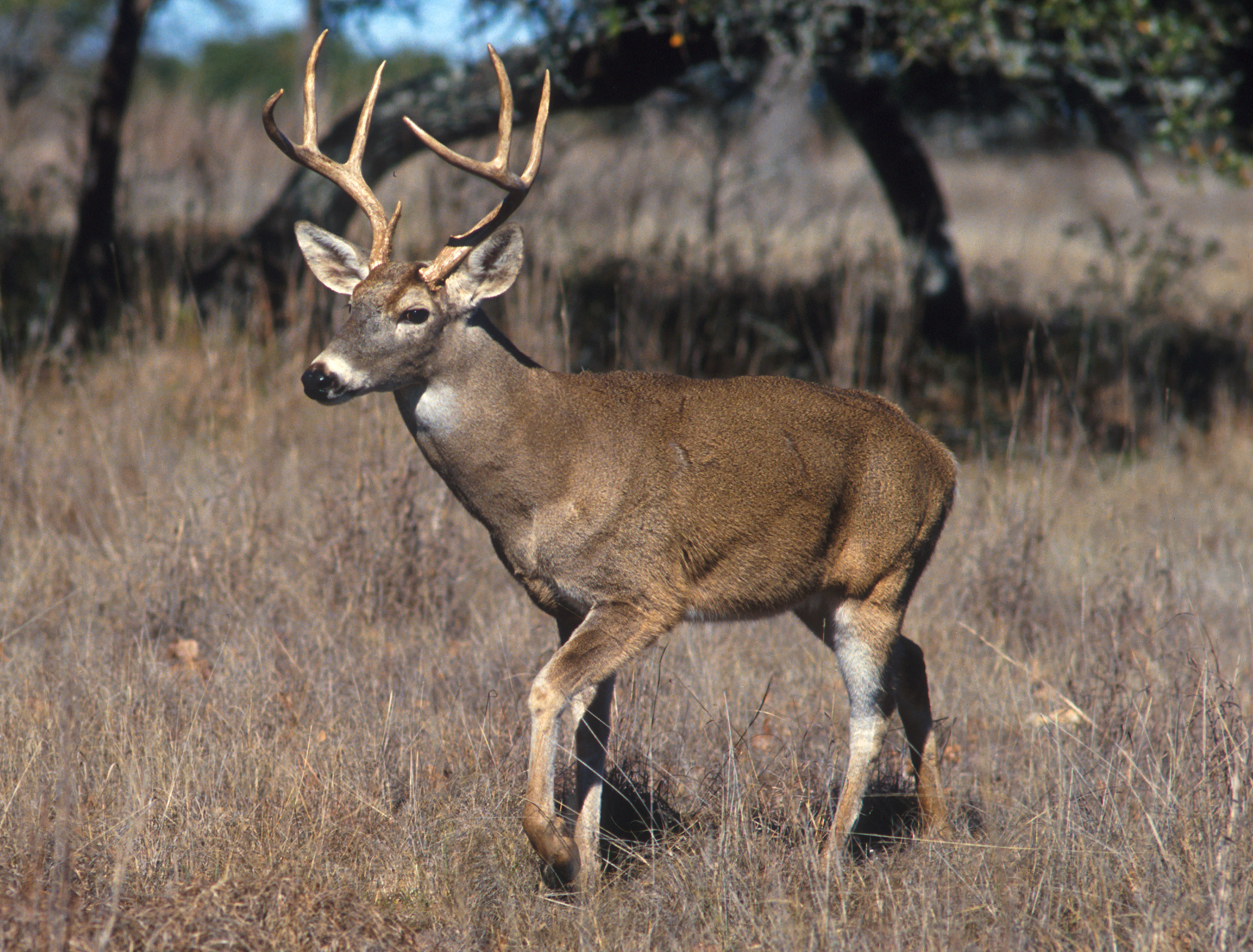
A hart or stag.

Folklore later taught in local elementary schools suggested that Hartford was originally a place to ford (or cross) Lick Creek. It was known as "Hart’s ford" or "Hart ford", where the "Hart" came either from a farmer named Jacob Hart or the old English word for stag – "hart". This evolved to Hartford. There was already another Hartford in Indiana, so eventually Blackford County's Hartford was changed to Hartford City to avoid confusion. By 1842, the community of Hartford consisted of seven families in log cabins. The family surnames were Branson, Brough, Graham, Marley, Payton, Shelton, and Turner. The Paytons and Graham were merchants. John Marley was the town's first blacksmith. Hartford grew to a population of 250 by 1850, and was said to have about 40 houses. The town had a post office, and a national Post Office directory for 1855 lists the town as Hartford City. Hartford City became incorporated as a town in 1857.

== Government ==
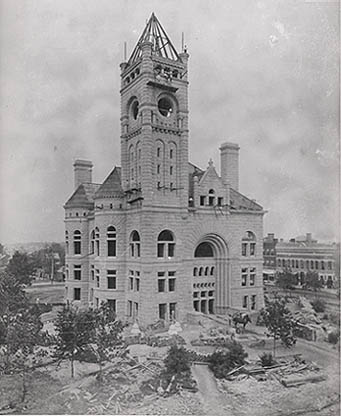
Blackford County courthouse under construction in 1894 in Hartford City

The village of Hartford was originally an unincorporated community governed by the county. Blackford County became organized in June 1839, when Indiana Governor David Wallace appointed Nicolas Friend acting sheriff. Mr. Friend was instructed to hold an election for county officers. The election was held at the log cabin home of one of the settlers in the village that would become Hartford. County officers elected were: Jacob Brugh, clerk-auditor-recorder; Jacob Emshwiller, treasurer; Frederick Bell, sheriff; and three county commissioners – Josephus Streeter, Jacob Schroyer, and Eli Rigdon. Among the board of county commissioners’ early projects were two items of particular interest for the future. First, the commissioners worked on a petition for a road that would run along the nearby Lick Creek toward the city of Portland in adjacent Jay County. Second, it was ordered that the Blackford County seat be called Hartford. (Later, "City" was added to the Hartford name because it was discovered that there was already another Hartford in Indiana.)

In 1857, work began on incorporating the community of Hartford as a town. Based on a May 1857 census, the community had 51 families totaling to 311 residents. On September 28, 1857, eligible voters approved a petition to incorporate as a town by a vote of 35 in favor and 18 against. As a result, the county commissioners declared the town incorporated on December 7, 1857. As a town, Hartford City was governed by a clerk-treasurer and town council, which were elected officials. The president of the town council was considered the town's executive.

In Indiana, towns with populations greater than 2,000 can convert to cities. Helped by the railroads and then the Gas Boom, Hartford City's population exceeded 2,000 by 1890. In February 1894, a petition was circulated that asked the town council to call a vote concerning changing the town to a city. The petition was successful, and in April 1894, voters in Hartford City decided in favor of a city charter. The voting was 606 for, and 114 against, the change. Shortly thereafter, both the Democrats and Republicans held conventions to nominate candidates for city offices. Positions in the new government were mayor, clerk, treasurer, marshal, and councilmen for four wards. In May 1894, Hartford City changed from governmental control by a town council to a government by a mayor and common council. The first mayor was Republican John A. Bonham.

== Early Transportation ==
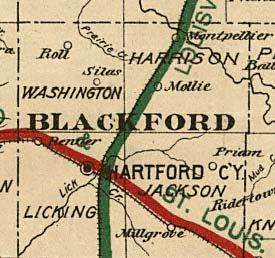
Railroad map of Blackford County in 1890s.

When the state of Indiana was formed, waterways were the best mode of transportation. Location on a river was vital to a community, and state planners viewed canals as a way to connect the state's navigable rivers. By the late 1840s and 1850s, planners realized that railroads would be a vital mode of transportation for Indiana, more so than constructing canals and "pikes". Railroads began a phenomenal growth in the state. Barely 200 miles of rail were in operation within the state in 1850, yet by 1860, more than 2,000 miles of track were in operation. By 1873, over 3,700 miles of main line were in service in Indiana.

Blackford County's first proposed railroad, which would run north–south, was the Fort Wayne & Southern Company, which was to be constructed southward from Fort Wayne through Bluffton and Hartford City to Muncie, where it would connect with some line that would enable it to run to Louisville, Kentucky. This rail line was proposed in 1849, and construction began in 1853. After some ownership changes, this line reached Hartford City in 1869. The first train from Fort Wayne all the way to Muncie ran in 1870. By that time, the railroad was named the Fort Wayne, Cincinnati and Louisville Railroad. In the next 130 years this rail line changed ownership (and name) often. Among other names this line was eventually called were the Lake Erie and Western Railroad, the Nickel Plate Road, and Norfolk & Western Railway.

The county's second proposed railroad was the first to operate in Hartford City, and it was the Pittsburgh, Cincinnati & Saint Louis, which was proposed around 1862. That line was completed to Hartford City in 1867. The line eventually became controlled by the Pennsylvania Railroad. (Many years later, a merger caused the line to be part of Penn Central, and then Conrail after a bankruptcy in 1970 and government reorganization.) After 1870, Hartford City had railroad service from two lines (see map), one moving north–south, and the other moving east–west. The north–south line is still in service, but as of 2008, the east–west line is no longer in service.

By the 1880s, Hartford City was also proud to have gravel roads in addition to its fine railroad facilities. One gravel road (also known as a pike) ran north–south through town and the entire county. In addition, another gravel road crossed town east–west, and it had several branches, including one as long as eight miles. In the mid-1890s, the town was believed to have more paved streets (made from cedar blocks) than any town of its size in the state of Indiana. During June 1896, work was begun on Hartford City's first brick street.

== 1880s and the Gas Boom ==
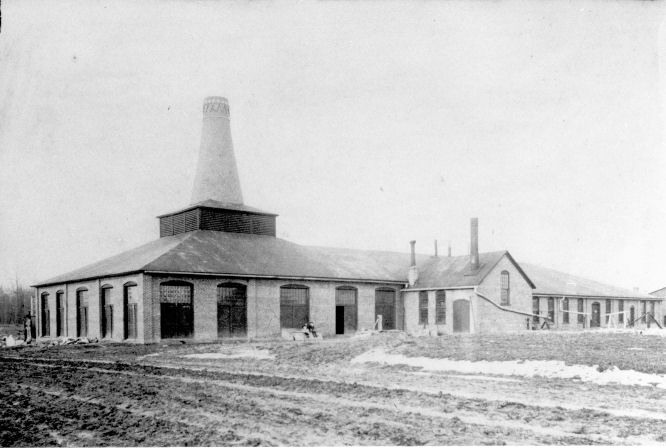
Hartford City’s Sneath Glass factory in 1895

In the early 1880s, Hartford City had about 1,800 residents, including 10 registered physicians. The city had three churches, a school, two hotels, a bank, and at least two newspapers. Manufacturing included two saw mills, a hub and spoke factory, a brick and tile factory, a flour mill, and more. Railroad service was available, with connections to the major cities of the day. The town also had two good gravel roads running east–west and north–south through the city.

During the late 1880s, the discovery of natural gas in east central Indiana led to a gas boom in east central Indiana. Some oil was also found in the area. The region of natural gas included Hartford City, and the town could add natural gas to its excellent transportation facilities as an incentive for manufacturers to locate there. Jesse H. Dowell organized the Hartford City National Gas and Oil Company, and this company drilled the city's first gas well in 1887. By 1894, the Gas Boom enabled the town to have the financial resources to build a new courthouse and its own public water supply. By 1895, Hartford City had 10 natural gas companies. As an indication that Hartford City had become a boom town, an 1895 directory lists 24 saloons and 13 law firms.

Numerous manufacturing companies moved to the "Gas Belt" area, lured by promises of free or low-cost natural gas and the excellent transportation service. Some of the companies that began manufacturing in Hartford City during the boom are: Hartford City Glass Company, Sneath Glass Company, Hartford City Paper Company, Utility Paper Company, Congress Cycle Company, Willman Lumber Company, A.A. Bowman & Company (a manufacturer of buggies and light vehicles), and Winklebeck & Winning (hoops and lumber). Hartford City Glass Company was acquired by American Window Glass Company just before 1900. Hartford City's population increased from 1,470 in 1880 to 5,912 in 1900. During 1901, Indiana state inspectors visited 15 manufacturing facilities in Hartford City, which employed 1,077 people. This was a huge increase in manufacturing employment considering the entire county had only 171 people working in manufacturing in June 1880. American Window Glass Company was the largest employer of the manufacturers inspected, with two plants employing a total of 508 people. The Sneath Glass Company was the second-largest employer, with 130 employees. The third and fourth largest employers were also glass-related businesses, making bottles. The lumber, tile, and foundry & machine works industries were also represented.

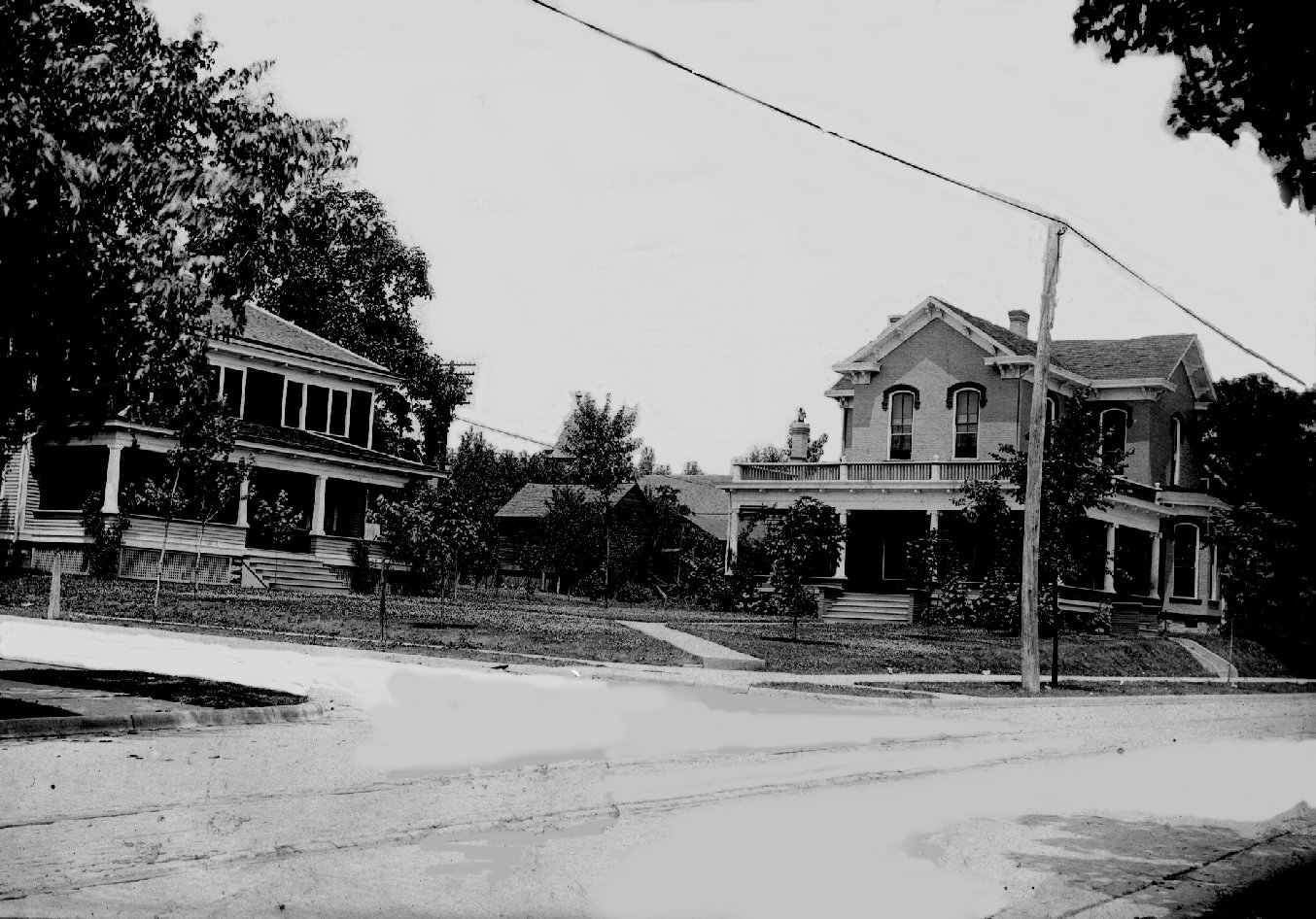
Two early 1900s homes in Hartford City with the Interurban line in front.

The brief boom transformed much of east central Indiana from an agriculture-oriented economy to an economy that also included manufacturing. Blackford County and adjacent Delaware, and Grant counties all had their population double in the twenty years from 1880 to 1900. Hartford City became even more connected to the larger cities in the state, such as Indianapolis and Fort Wayne, by the interurban rail line that began running in 1905 on Jefferson Street through the middle of town. By 1905, the gas boom was mostly over, as much of the natural gas was wasted or mismanaged. However, Hartford City was permanently changed. Manufacturing became important in addition to agriculture, and the town had a skilled workforce. The town had grown large enough to incorporate as a city. The city's prosperity enabled it to have a good quality infrastructure: a water works, two railroads plus the interurban system, and brick roads. Many of the buildings built around the town square at that time are still in use over 100 years later – including the courthouse, library, and some of the churches.

New technology had also come to town. An 1895 directory lists two telephone companies within the city in addition to a telegraph company. Hartford City had at least one automobile by 1900, as Mr. Ed Cooley took delivery of an electric runabout. The 1,700-pound vehicle could run 30 miles on one charge at speeds of at least 16 miles per hour. In 1908, talking pictures were seen in Hartford City for the first time. The three pictures, shown at the Star Theatre, featured Black Patti, the Heidelberg Quartette, and the Johnson Cake Walkers.

== After the Gas Boom ==
Historical population
Census	Pop.	Note	%±
1850	250		—
1860	618		147.2%
1870	878		42.1%
1880	1,470		67.4%
1890	2,287		55.6%
1900	5,912		158.5%
1910	6,187		4.7%
1920	6,183		−0.1%
1930	6,613		7.0%
1940	6,946		5.0%
1950	7,253		4.4%
1960	8,053		11.0%
1970	8,207		1.9%
1980	7,622		−7.1%
1990	6,960		−8.7%
2000	6,928		−0.5%
2010	6,220		−10.2%
2020	6,086		−2.2%

After the gas boom, some of the towns that had fewer businesses became ghost towns. However, most of the manufacturers did not immediately move from the area because there was no gas boom elsewhere. Many of Hartford City's skilled workers remained living in town. The two largest employers, American Window Glass and Sneath Glass, continued operations. The American Window Glass plant lasted until the Great Depression, as its manufacturing process gradually became obsolete. Sneath Glass lasted until the 1950s, when the new plastics industry made many of its products obsolete. Another company from the boom era, Willman Lumber, was still operating in the 1970s. While Blackford County’s post-boom population declined, Hartford City's remained stable. Some of the local workforce became employed in nearby cities such as Muncie, Marion, and Anderson, where jobs related to the new automobile industry were available.

In the 1920s, city leaders convinced Overhead Door Company to move its headquarters and manufacturing to Hartford City. Overhead Door grew and became a major employer in town for the next 40 years. Gas Boom companies Hartford City Paper, American Window Glass, and Sneath Glass were still operating plants in the city. Another paper mill that would have a long future in town was the Fort Wayne Corrugated Paper Company, which built a plant in the city in 1921. By the 1930s, major town business establishments included Hartford Ice Company, Overhead Door, multiple glass factories, and paper mills.

=== George D. Stevens ===
George D. Stevens, a former executive at Hartford City's Fort Wayne Corrugated Paper Company, shocked the city after his death. Stevens moved to Hartford City in 1911. He was a quiet, distinguished-looking, widower that lived alone at the Hotel Hartford. He had natural mechanical skills, and rose to an executive engineering position at the city's Fort Wayne Corrugated paper mill. Stevens became one of the wealthiest men in town, and was chauffeured to and from work. He received a patent in 1931, and perhaps this was a hint of additional sources of income that helped him accumulate his wealth. Stevens was known as a philanthropist within the community, and also started the Akron Foundation in his original home town of Akron, Ohio. He became one of Hartford City's leading citizens, and joined the town's Rotary Club, Elks Lodge, and Masonic Lodge. His quiet social life often involved simply sitting in the lobby of the Hotel Hartford, and chatting with those that approached him. He died in Hartford City of chronic myocarditis at the age of 80 on April 8, 1940. His death was front-page news in the local newspapers, and the paper mill shut down for a half day. Some of the citizens of Hartford City attended Stevens’ funeral 260 miles away in Akron – and were surprised to learn that Stevens was a black man that had been living as a white man in an all-white town. Given the Ku Klux Klan activities in Hartford City during the 1920s (all other blacks left town during that time), perhaps Stevens felt his masquerade was necessary. Black or white, Hartford City was fortunate to have George Stevens as a member of the community.

=== Post War ===
Manufacturing in Hartford City was different after World War II and the Korean War. The glass factories of the area were no longer the most important employers, as most of them had shut down. The community was fortunate to have Overhead Door and Fort Wayne Corrugated as major employers in addition to the auto parts manufacturers in nearby towns. Soon, another company came to town and joined Overhead Door as an important employer. In 1955, 3M (Minnesota Mining and Manufacturing), purchased the former (boom company) Hartford City Paper plant in Hartford City, and became one of the city's major employers. Although the products have changed through the years, 3M still employs over 200 people at the Hartford City plant, which is currently (2009) a tape manufacturing facility. Not far from the 3M plant, the Fort Wayne Corrugated Paper Company plant closed in 1959. However, the plant was purchased by St. Joe Paper Company and continued operations.

By 1964, Overhead Door's growth enabled the company's stock to be listed in the American Stock Exchange, and it had multiple manufacturing facilities including the Hartford City plant. The company simply outgrew Hartford City. In 1965, it relocated its headquarters to Dallas, Texas. The Overhead Door manufacturing plant in Hartford City continued production, but it eventually cut back its operations in 1985. In 2000, the plant was closed.

During the 1980s, the economic decline of the "Rust Belt" region of the United States (and cutbacks at Overhead Door) coincided with the decline in Hartford City's population. The recent economic difficulties for the automobile industry have also been unfortunate for the economy of Hartford City, but the town continues to work to attract new businesses.

== Newspapers ==
The Hartford City Times, which began in 1852, is considered by most sources as the community's first newspaper. It was published by Dr. John E. Moler. However, this newspaper was used mostly for advertising, and therefore some may consider it more of an advertiser than a newspaper. The Blackford County News was started later in 1852, and is considered by at least one source as the city's first newspaper. The town's (and county's) first daily newspaper, the Evening News, was started in 1894 by Edward Everett Cox. The Evening News was eventually renamed the Hartford City News.

Hartford City had numerous newspaper companies from 1852 until the end of the 19th century. Many of those companies went out of business shortly after a new newspaper was started, although the town was able to support multiple newspapers during the Gas Boom period.

By the 20th century (and after the Gas Boom), the Hartford City newspaper business became more stable. The Hartford City News and the Hartford City Times were major newspapers from the previous century that were still publishing. The Times was the voice of the Republican Party, and the News was the voice of the Democratic Party.

The Blackford County Gazette began in 1901, and it had a column written in French to attract the French-speaking Belgian glass workers living mostly in the south side of the city. In 1905, the Hartford City Times and Blackford County Gazette were merged, and the new weekly became known as the Times-Gazette. The Times-Gazette and the daily Hartford City News became the leading newspapers in town. E. E. Cox, considered one of the most influential figures in journalism in Blackford County, ran the Hartford City News for about 40 years before he died in 1931. The Cox family sold the Hartford City News to the owners of the Times-Gazette in 1937, and the combined entity became the Hartford City News-Times. The Hartford City News-Times, changing ownership over the years, continued operations through the 20th century. Beginning 2007, the Hartford City News-Times began using the name News-Times on its web site (without Hartford City), and calls itself "Blackford County’s only daily newspaper".

== City Borders ==
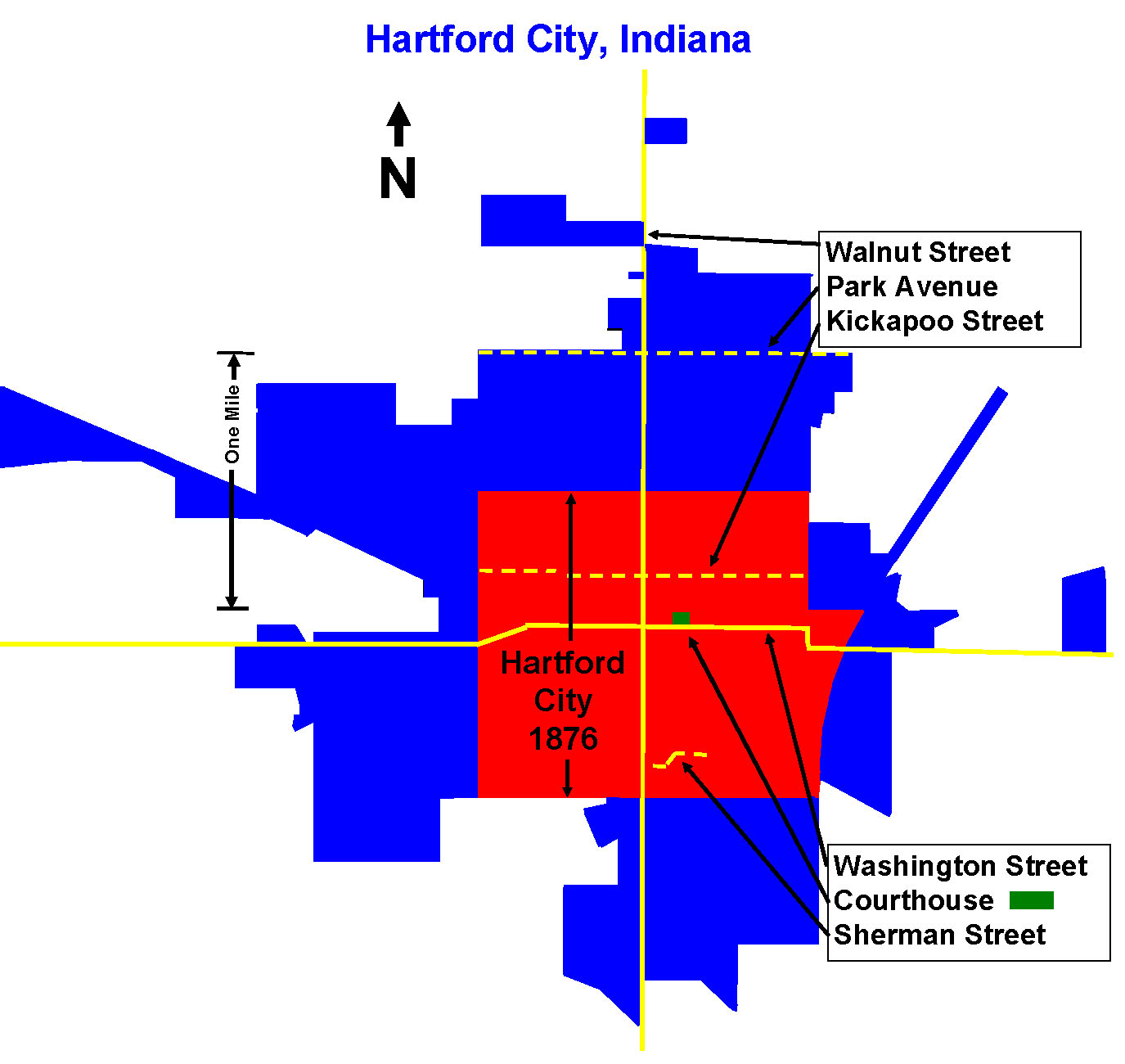
Hartford City town borders in 1876 (red) and 2009 (blue)

In the late 1830s, the community of Hartford was just a few log cabins along Lick Creek. There were no "streets", only paths that had been cleared between the cabins. The future town was eventually "platted" mostly north of Lick Creek using the Public Land Survey System typical of Northwest Ordinance communities. A map of Hartford in 1847 shows the original courthouse in the area where today's courthouse is located. One could not travel in any direction from the courthouse for more than two blocks without arriving at a farm. Walnut Street was on the west side of the community, and it was the road to take north to travel from Hartford to Dundee.

The adjacent map shows the borders of Hartford City as a town in 1876 in red, and the borders of the city in 2009 in blue. In 1876, the town of Hartford City would still have not experienced the Gas Boom that caused much of its growth. Walnut Street, which would eventually become part of Indiana State Road 3, was the one road that ran from the town's northern border to the town's southern border and beyond. Washington Street, which eventually became part of Indiana State Road 26 crossed the town at its eastern and western borders and beyond. Kickapoo Street was the northernmost street running east–west that ran completely from the western border to the eastern border. A portion of the land north of Kickapoo within the town's corporate limits had no streets. On the south side, Sherman Street was the southernmost street on the east side of town, and is not far from Lick Creek. As can be seen, much (but not all) of Hartford City's expansion was to the north and west. The area north of Park Avenue was all farm land until the 1950s.

== Schools ==
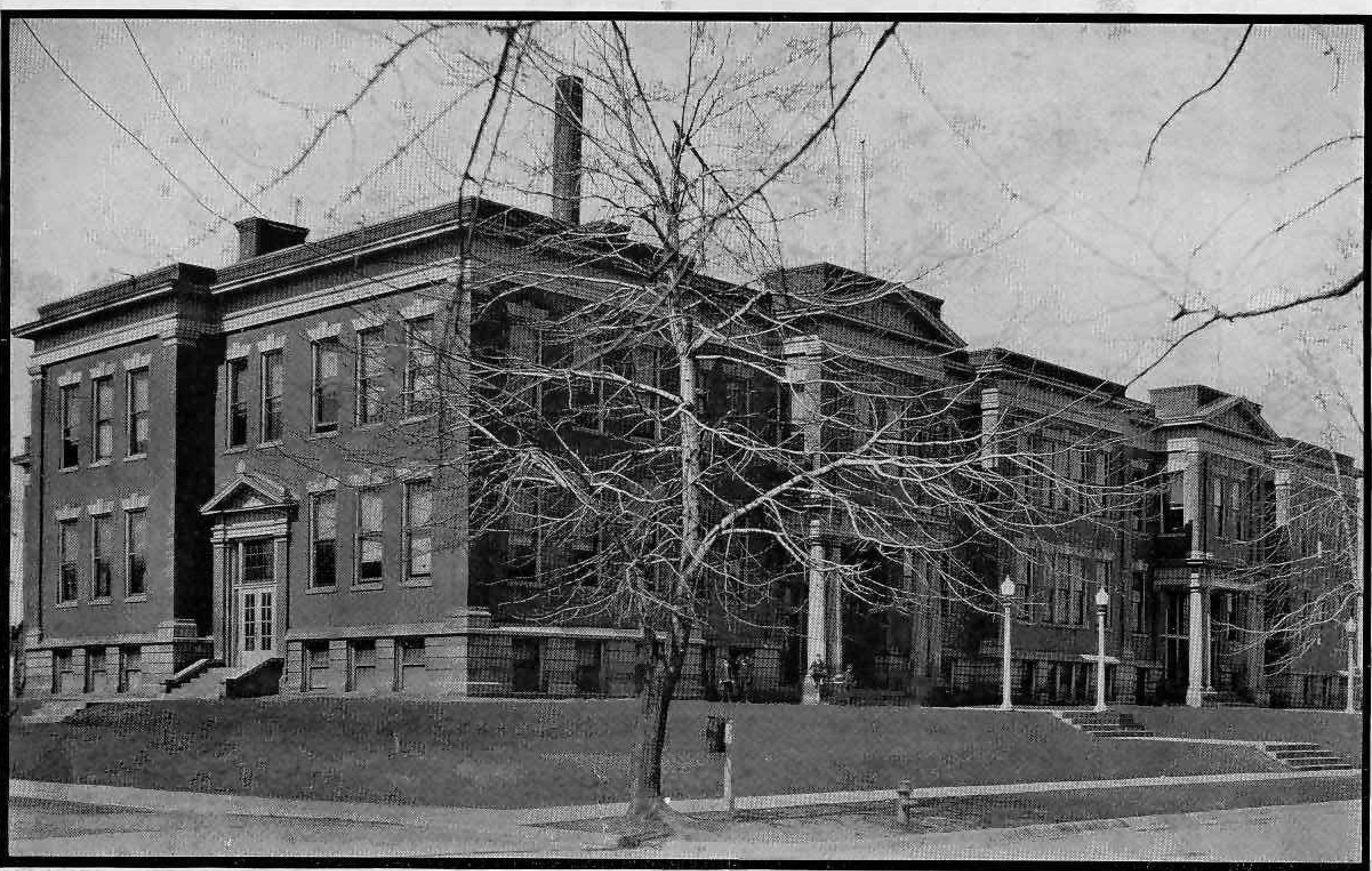
Hartford City High School circa 1922

Hartford City, known as Hartford at the time, had a private school established by missionaries around 1838. In general, schools in the surrounding Blackford County area began being organized around 1840. Like other buildings at that time, the school buildings were log cabins. Teachers were paid by the local community. Frame buildings began being used throughout the county by the 1860s. Educational emphasis in the classroom was originally placed on "the three Rs": reading, writing, and arithmetic.

Hartford City first organized a public school in 1853, before the community was incorporated. The school was administered by the township trustee until Hartford City incorporated as a town in 1857. The brick school structure had two rooms. Additional small buildings were utilized in Hartford City as demands for classroom space increased following the Civil War. By 1886, the entire county had 47 school "houses", and employed 56 teachers. Hartford City's participation in the Indiana Gas Boom caused even more demand for classroom space during the 1890s. The city responded by building a two-story schoolhouse on the north edge of town. The building, known as the "North Building", was located on North High Street, and it was ready for students in January, 1892.

In the 1890s and earlier, only a few of the town's students graduated from high school. For example, in 1896, Hartford City High School's 15th graduating class consisted of a total of seven students: five girls and two boys. The town had a problem with eighth grade students deciding to not continue their education into high school. This was especially a problem for boys, who may have been lured by work available in a city enjoying a "boom" because of the abundant natural gas. In the 1890s and the following decade, Hartford City had numerous glass works – nine glass factories are listed in a 1906 city directory. Glass factories were notorious for employing underage children. Some of the area companies were fined by the state for employing underage children. Complicating the matter, the North Building that housed high school and other students was destroyed by fire in January 1897. A second building, in the same location, burned down in 1903. The city built two school buildings on the same north site in 1905 — and those brick buildings did not burn. The two buildings would serve the community for more than 60 years. One of the buildings was an elementary school known as North Ward, and the other was Hartford City High School. Both buildings had two stories plus a basement, and the high school had an assembly room and gym.

Major Hartford City High school courses around 1900 were Latin, mathematics, science, history, and English. In 1906, the town added to its high school curriculum not only to improve the quality of education available to the students, but also as an effort to attract and retain older students. The English-Latin course of study was retained, but scientific and commercial courses were added. Some of these new classes included bookkeeping, cooking, drafting, sewing, typewriting, and woodworking. The upgrade was popular with parents and students, as high school enrollment increased 50 percent in two years. The new high school may have also been an enticement for students, and additions were made to the structure in 1915. The photo herein shows Hartford City High School around 1922, before a larger gym was added. The larger gym enabled Hartford City to host sectional basketball tournaments, and the original gym eventually became a room for the band. Hartford City High School was replaced by Blackford High School in the Fall 1969 school year. The new high school also included students from Montpelier High School.

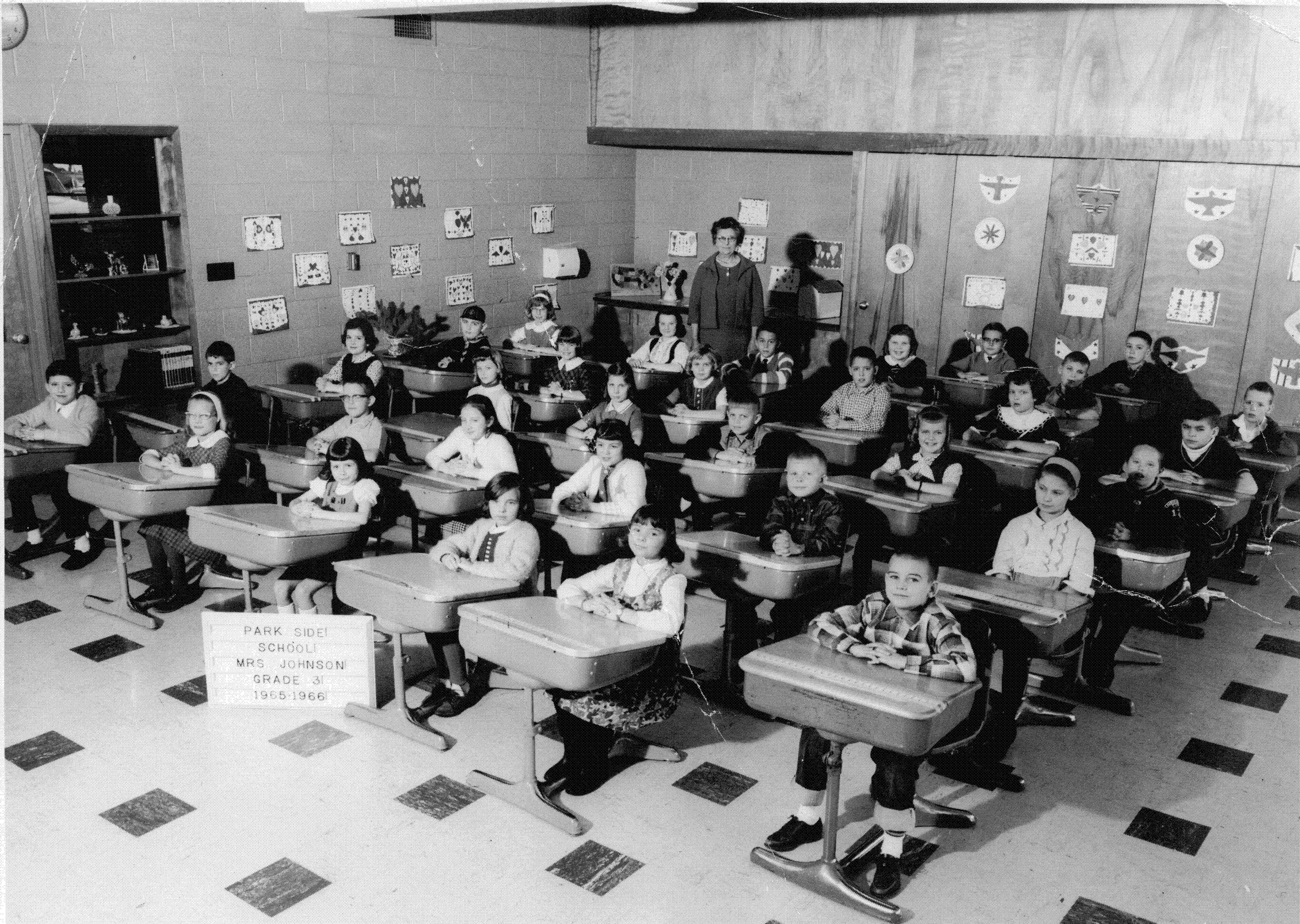
A 1965 classroom in Parkside Elementary

As the city grew, it became necessary to have an elementary school in each quadrant of town. Some of these original elementary schools were outgrown and replaced. Parkside Elementary School was built on the west side of town adjacent to Sigma Phi Gamma park. It replaced an old west side school and the elementary portion of the North Ward school. Construction began in August 1954, and part of the school was ready for students at the beginning of the 1955–1956 school year. The building was the first electrically heated school in the entire region north of the Ohio River and east of the Rocky Mountains. By 1959, the school had capacity for a kindergarten and two classes each for grades one through six. The school also had a cafeteria that saw additional use as a gym.

Hartford City Junior High School was built in 1962 next to Parkside Elementary, and students moved from the North Ward and Hartford City High School to the junior high in January 1963. Elementary schools that fed into the junior high in the 1960s included Parkside, Southside, Northside, and William Reed Elementary. (William Reed was named after a Hartford City school superintendent that served near the end of the 19th century.) In addition, students from two rural elementary schools, located in the county's Licking Township and Jackson Township, also attended. At this time, the junior high school building is now (2009) a middle school serving the entire county.

== Sports ==
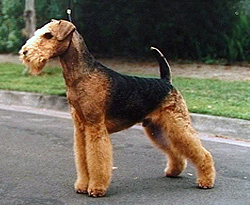
An Airedale

Sports are important to small towns, and are sometimes the major form of entertainment. Hartford City has had its share of individual athletes that excelled in their high school sport and continued to play at the collegiate level. A basketball example is Harry Ayers, captain of the 1902-03 Indiana University basketball team. Another example is Erika Wicoff, three-time Big Ten golf champion for Indiana University.

In Hartford City, high school basketball, baseball and (American) football enjoyed popularity. The state of Indiana is well known for its "Hoosier Hysteria" over high school basketball. Currently (2009), Hartford City's Blackford High School gym seats 4,000 for basketball, which means over half the town could sit in the high school's gym.

Hartford City High School sports teams began in 1908 with a coachless basketball team. A football program started in 1923, but was abandoned three years later. There was no team nickname until 1923, when the football team became known as the Copperheads. That year's basketball team was called the Scarlet Scourge. A year or two later, the team became permanently known as the Airedales. The story behind the Airedale nickname involved Albert Cox, who also happened to be the son of one of the local newspaper publishers, E.E. Cox. Albert was the school's "yell leader", and he had a pet Airedale. (See 1923 basketball team picture below. Cox is holding the basketball.) The dog liked to follow its owner to team practices, and became the school mascot. Thus, the Hartford City High School teams became known as the Airedales. Albert Cox eventually served in World War II, and is listed on Hartford City's monument to World War II veterans. However, the dog achieved more fame than its owner.

=== Basketball ===
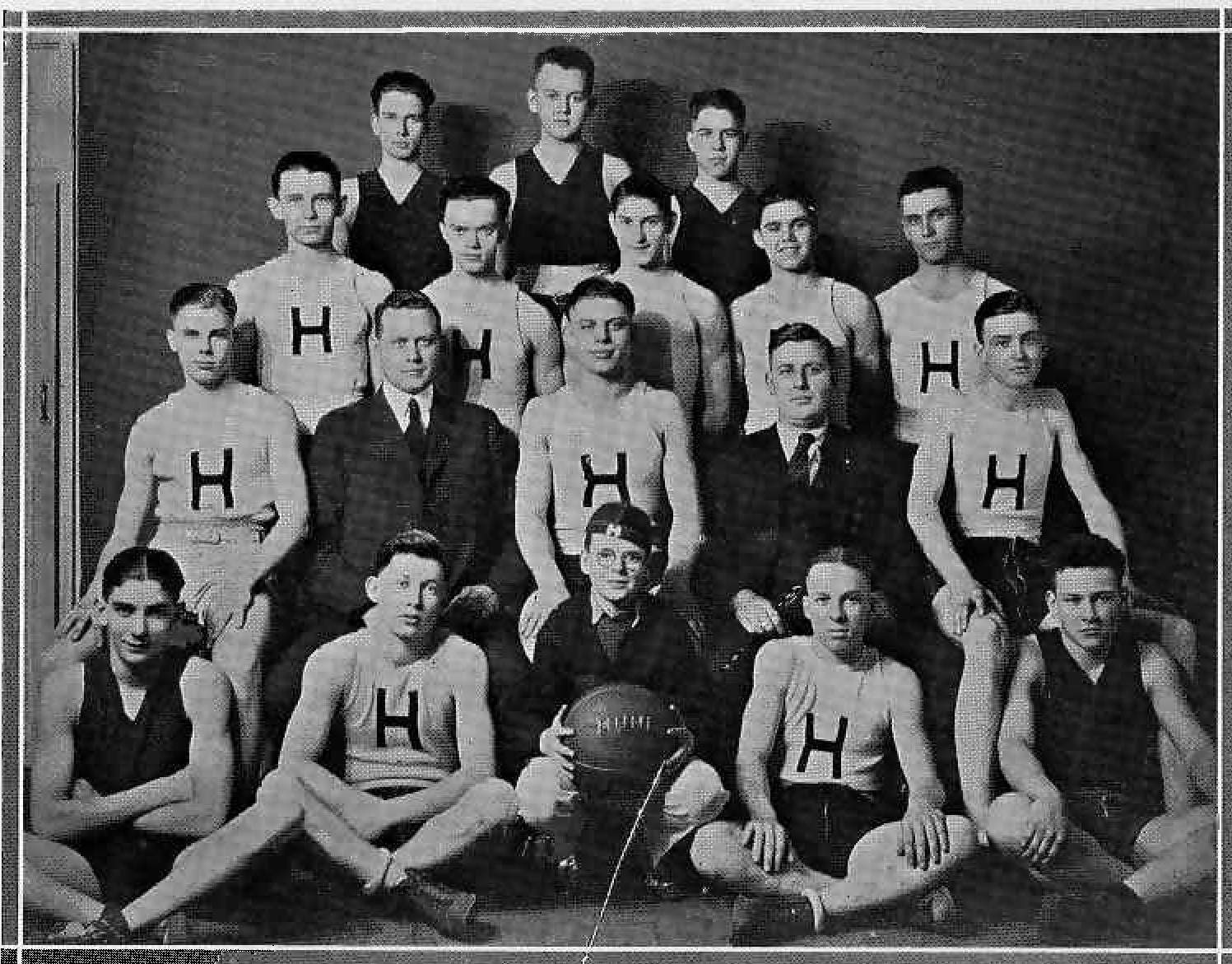
Hartford City High School’s 1923 sectional champion basketball team

In the early years of the 20th century, the only varsity sport at Hartford City High School was basketball. Hartford City's greatest success in high school basketball was the 1919–1920 season, which took place before the state tournament had "Regionals" and "Semifinals". Hartford City was coached by Homer Stonebraker, a former semi-professional basketball player who is now considered one of the state's all-time greatest high school basketball players. As a high school basketball player elsewhere in Indiana, Mr. Stonebraker once scored 74 points in a regular season game, and led two state championship teams. The Stonebraker-coached Hartford City 1919–1920 team finished the season with a 26-win and 5-loss record, reaching the final four in the Indiana state basketball tournament before being eliminated in a 21 to 16 loss. Earlier in the season, Hartford City defeated Roll High School by a score of 164 to 6.

Hartford City basketball teams had several other famous coaches. Former Purdue basketball player Blair Gullion coached the team (basketball and football) during the mid-1920s, and later became head coach at Earlham, Tennessee, Cornell, Connecticut and Washington University in St. Louis. He also authored three books on the theories of coaching basketball. Coach J.B. Good won six sectional championships during the 1930s. A coach during the 1960s, Dave McCracken, is the son of Branch McCracken, Indiana University's coach for the university's 1940 and 1953 national championships.

The most unexpected basketball tournament success came in 1953, when the "oft-beaten" Hartford City Airedales advanced to the final eight teams in the state tournament by winning against undefeated and once-defeated teams in the Marion Regional. The regional championship game was won by Hartford City in overtime with a final score of 67 to 64. The game had been tied at 64 with 95 seconds to play, and a basket by the Airedales’ Tom Smith plus a free throw by Don McDermott accounted for the margin of victory. The speedy Hartford City team won its first game in the state semi-final, but then was beaten by a tall Richmond team that featured 6 ft 6 in (198 cm) and 6 ft 5 in (196 cm) big men.

Hartford City High School won 14 sectionals and 3 regionals in about 60 years of boys basketball tournament action. Hartford City High School was consolidated into Blackford High School in 1969, and through 2024 Blackford won 12 sectionals. Former Montpelier High School coach Jon Stroup coached Blackford High School to eight of its sectional championships. Until the 1997–1998 season, the Indiana High School basketball tournament was a single tournament—teams from all sizes of schools played in the same tournament. Hartford City High was considerably smaller than many high schools, and Blackford High School typically has well under 1,000 students. Blackford's most recent basketball success was the 2020–2021 season where they advanced to the state 2A semifinals. They were led by Indiana All-Star Luke Brown, who averaged 31.7 points per game.

=== Football ===
Although Hartford City High School briefly attempted (American) football in during the 1920s, the school football program did not begin permanently until 1945. After some unsuccessful years, the 1950 team coached by John Carbone was undefeated, winning the Central Indiana Conference championship. The football field was located adjacent to the city's Sigma Phi Gamma Park, which was within walking distance of the high school.

Two factors during the 1960s contributed to future football success in Hartford City. First, the city began a Pee Wee Football program for younger players. Second, the 1969 merger of Hartford City High School with Montpelier High School meant that the one high school would have incoming players with experience from two junior high schools instead of just one. The new Blackford High School was the state runner-up in the first Indiana AA Football Championship in 1973. The following year, the Blackford Bruins won their first state AA football championship by the score of 28 to 14. The undefeated Bruins team was coached by former Hartford City High School coach Eldon Leeth, and averaged over 400 yards of offense per game. Bud Brown (3 touchdowns in the championship game) was the leading running back in the high-powered wishbone offense. A second AA championship was won in 1979, when coach Charles Lori's team defeated Noblesville 24 to 22.

=== Baseball ===
Hartford City had baseball teams as early as the 1890s. These teams would travel to nearby cities such as Portland, Indiana, to play exhibition games. In 1905, playing baseball on Sunday became an issue in town. Members of the Christian community believed that baseball games played on Sundays would be contrary to their religious beliefs. A proposed compromise solution to the problem involved guest ministers and pre-game sermons. This compromise was accepted, and baseball was played on Sundays after a sermon at the ball park.

Younger players in town have also enjoyed the baseball tradition. A junior baseball league began in 1932 with support from the local Rotary Club. Eight teams were organized with fifteen players each, ranging in age from 11 to 17 years old. Hartford City has had various baseball leagues for many years since the Rotary Club's league, including Little League, Babe Ruth League, and Men's Slow-Pitch. The town takes pride in having baseball facilities for players of all ages.

Hartford City's current local high school, Blackford High, has won six (boys) regional baseball championships. The 1976–77 and 1977–78 teams finished second in the state tournament. Both of those outstanding teams were coached by Craig Moore. Several players from the 1970s are worth noting. Blackford High School player Brian Lanham was the recipient of the L. V. Phillips Mental Attitude Award for the 1977–78 season. The recipient of this award must excel in mental attitude, scholarship, leadership and athletic ability in baseball. Other Blackford High School players of note include Tim Oberholtzer, who played for Indiana University; Leroy Robbins, who played for the University of Kentucky; and Leroy's brother, Bruce Robbins, who was drafted by a professional team after high school.

== Weather ==
The highest recorded temperature for Hartford City was 103.0 °F (39.0 °C) on June 25, 1988, and the lowest recorded temperature was −26.0 °F (−32.0 °C) on January 19, 1994. June is typically the wettest month, with an average of 4.33 inches of precipitation. Hartford City has endured a few tornadoes, including an F4 (maximum speeds 207 to 260 mph) on Palm Sunday (April 11) in 1965 that crossed Blackford County 7 miles from the center of the city. Two F1 tornadoes crossed the middle of town in November 2002. Hail 4.5 inches in diameter fell in Hartford City on April 9, 2001. In a tie with the city of Cayuga, those hail "stones" are the largest ever recorded in the state of Indiana. The biggest snow storm in recent memory for Hartford City was the Great Blizzard of 1978, which occurred on January 26–27, 1978.
