= Mollie, Indiana =

Mollie
- Extinct village
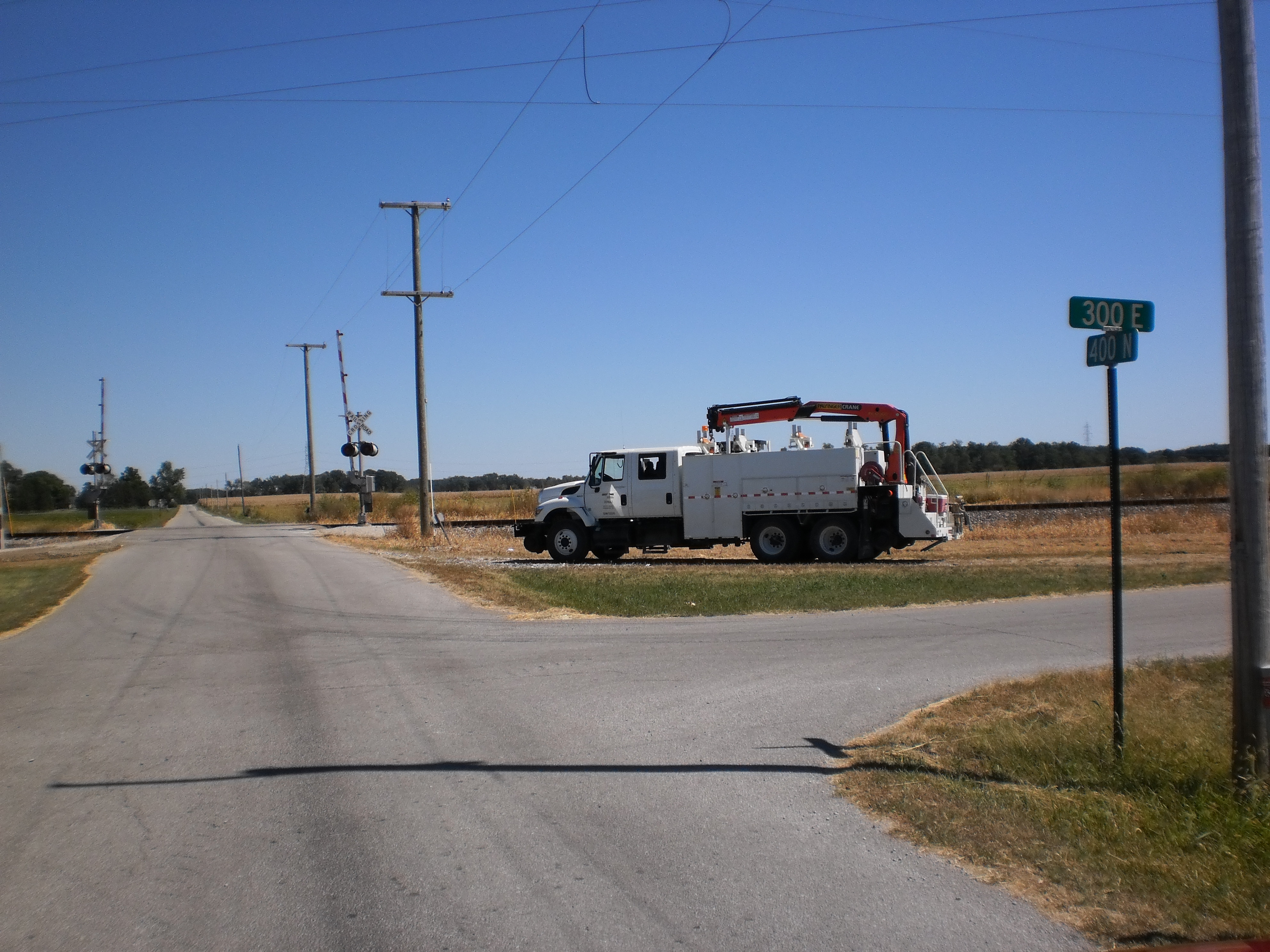
- Location of Mollie

- Location within Indiana
- Coordinates: 40°30′30″N 85°18′54″W
- Country: United States
- State: Indiana
- County: Blackford
- Township: Harrison
- Established: 1880s
- Elevation: 869 ft (265 m)

Population (1980)
  - Total: 5
- Time zone: UTC-5 (EST)
  - Summer (DST): UTC-4 (EDT)
- ZIP code: 47348
- Area code: 765

Mollie is an extinct American village in Blackford County, Indiana, that flourished during the Indiana Gas Boom from the 1880s until the 1920s. The region around Mollie experienced an economic "boom" period because of the discovery of gas and crude oil. Mollie was a stop along the Fort Wayne, Cincinnati, and Louisville Railroad—and happened to be near the region's oil fields, a convenient location for the area's oil workers.

Mollie's location on the railroad line was approximately halfway between the two largest cities in Blackford County: Hartford City and Montpelier. In addition to the oil fields, the area was also fertile farmland. Two county roads intersected at Mollie, making it well-located for area farmers as well as the oil workers. The small community had a feed mill, a grocery, a Post Office, and a livestock station. The sole manufacturing facility was a brick and tile mill. Mollie's significance, in addition to its participation in the Indiana Gas Boom and its railroad station, is that Mollie is thought to be the site of the first aircraft landing in Blackford County.

Most of the small community's growth and demise is linked to the Indiana Gas Boom. Two other factors were minor contributors to Mollie's decline. First, the depletion of the raw material used in the community's tile manufacturing factory meant that Mollie lost its only manufacturer. A second factor was the automobile. Improvements in modern highway systems, automobile reliability, and automobile availability made people less dependent on railroads for transportation—diminishing Mollie's value as a stop along a railroad line.

Today (2011), none of the community's commercial buildings remain. Two houses are located nearby—including one that was built using bricks made from the community's tile mill. Interurban lines declined in popularity in Indiana during the 20th century, and a line serving Mollie was removed in the 1940s. Although the track that was the Mollie railroad spur is gone, freight trains operated by the Norfolk Southern Railway still operate over the adjacent main line.

== History ==
The small East Central Indiana village named Mollie was located in the Harrison Township section of Blackford County, at the intersection of county roads 400 North and 300 East. A railroad line passes very close to the intersection. A former resident, interviewed in 1972, believes the community was named after an early resident named Mollie, but she cannot recall Mollie's surname. The community was essentially a small informal cluster of houses around a train station, and it was never officially platted.

=== Gas boom ===
In 1887, natural gas was discovered in nearby Hartford City, and Blackford County began its participation in the Indiana Gas Boom. More importantly for Mollie, oil was discovered north of Hartford City in Harrison Township. Blackford County's first oil well began producing during 1890 in Harrison Township south of Montpelier, Indiana (which is north of Mollie). By the mid-1890s, about two thirds of Harrison Township (25 square miles) was considered part of an oil-producing region. Nearby Montpelier was thought to be "the very heart of the greatest natural gas and oil field in the world". Mollie's location along Blackford County's north–south railroad line is about 4.5 miles (7.2 km) from Hartford City and 3.6 miles (5.8 km) from Montpelier. During the Indiana Gas Boom, Mollie's location was ideal for men working in nearby oil fields. Thus, Mollie had the fortune during the 1890s of being located between two boomtowns, having an oil field nearby, and having railroad service.

=== Post office ===
Mollie's Post Office was established October 19, 1888. Henry H. Dean was the first postmaster, and this Post Office lasted for about one year before it was discontinued. The Post Office restarted on February 6, 1890, with Anderson Hatfield as the postmaster. It was housed in the front of Jacob Burnworth's grocery store. This Post Office became especially useful for workers in the nearby oil fields because mail could be easily sent and retrieved using the railroad. Although the grocery building burnt to the ground in 1891, the facility was rebuilt. The United States Official Postal Guide lists the Mollie Post Office as one of seven Post Offices in Blackford County during 1895. In addition to the Post Office, the grocery building had a small waiting room for railroad passengers.

Mollie's Post Office was discontinued in February 1907, and area mail began being handled by nearby Hartford City's Post Office. Although the Mollie Post Office was busy during the earlier years when the Blackford County oil field operations were significant, Postmaster Jacob Burnworth felt that decreased business made it a "waste of time" to continue. Despite the closing of the Mollie Post Office, the grocery housed in the same building continued, as did the waiting station for the interurban that was also located in the building. In 1914, burning soot caused the grocery store building to burn to the ground.

=== Aircraft landing ===
Near the end of World War I, an army biplane was forced to land near Mollie because of engine failure. This was exciting news in Blackford County, and people paid to ride the trolley (interurban line) to Mollie to see the aircraft. A county historian believes this was one of the first, if not the first, aircraft to land in Blackford County.

== Geography ==
Mollie is considered part of East Central Indiana and Northern Indiana. It is located about 44 miles (71 km) south of Fort Wayne, Indiana, and about 71 miles (114 km) northeast of Indianapolis.

Beneath the soil of Mollie lies the Trenton Oil and Gas Field responsible for the Indiana Gas Boom. Oil production from the Trenton Field, which affected Mollie more than the production of natural gas, peaked around 1904.

Future Northern Indiana, including what became Harrison Township and Mollie, was flattened by two glaciers millions of years ago. These glaciers are also responsible for the rich Blackford County farmland, which includes the land surrounding Mollie. "Standard cereals, wool and live stock" were the products of the area farms during Mollie's more prosperous years in the 1890s. One hundred years later, the region is still agriculture-oriented. Soybeans and corn are the most popular crops grown in Blackford County, and over 65,000 acres (260 km^{2}) (60%) are devoted to these two crops according to a survey from the 1990s. Additional crops and livestock are also grown in Blackford County.

== Demographics ==
Milestone years in Mollie's history are 1870, when the railroad line was completed; 1878, when leading-citizen Jacob Burnworth moved to Blackford County; 1888, when the Mollie Post Office opened; 1890, when the first oil well was successfully drilled between Montpelier and Mollie; and 1907, when the Mollie Post Office closed because of the end of the Gas (and oil) Boom. These events outline the rise, and the beginning of the decline, of the community. Population patterns can be expected to follow this outline.

Census information is not directly available for Mollie. Residents of Mollie were counted as part of Blackford County's Harrison Township, and the "Name of incorporated city, town, or village, within the above named division" heading on the census page was left blank. The population in 1890 for the entire Harrison Township less the city of Montpelier was 1,900. This would include farms, Mollie, and other small villages similar to Mollie. For the year 1900, the census lists the population for Harrison Township less the city of Montpelier as 1,867. Based on entries in a county directory, Mollie was populated by at least 15 households in 1902. Using the Mollie households listed in the county directory, and census counts for each matching Harrison Township household, Mollie's unofficial population must have exceeded 55 in 1900. The 1900 Census is probably the census that is closest to Mollie's peak year for population. The oil part of the Indiana Gas Boom was just beginning in 1890, and the boom was already over by 1910—as evidenced by the closing of the Mollie Post Office in 1907. Mollie's population has been estimated to have a peaked around 25 during the 1920s, less than half of the probable population in 1900. Over the next 50 years the population continued to decline, and by the 1970s, Mollie consisted of just two houses. Mollie's population in 1972 was 4—increasing to 5 people in 1980.

== Economy ==
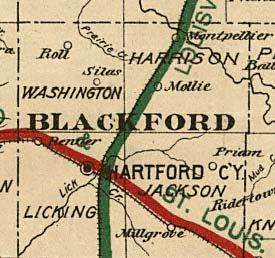
Mollie in Blackford County portion of 1890s railroad map.

Mollie's economy was centered on its railroad stop and agriculture. Mollie had a grain elevator, and grain and hay raised by area farmers were shipped out via the railroad. Mollie's railroad facility, and the Mollie stockyard, were used by area farmers to ship livestock. Farmers on horseback, and on foot, would drive cattle or hogs down the county roads to Mollie's stockyard. Livestock were typically shipped to stockyards in New York or Chicago. Some livestock, such as lambs from the west, also came into Mollie by rail.

Mollie's only manufacturing facility was a tile mill. Drainage tiles were important in Blackford County during the 19th century because of the original swampy condition of the land. The tile mill manufactured drain tile, building blocks, and bricks. At least one of the two houses still standing in the Mollie was built by using bricks from the local tile factory. Tile mill products could easily be shipped on the nearby railroad.

Other businesses in Mollie included the general store, a cider mill, and a blacksmith shop. These businesses had extra demand for their services during the Indiana Gas Boom, when numerous oil field workers worked nearby.

== Infrastructure ==
Mollie is located at the intersection of county roads 400 North and 300 East. A railroad passes very close to the intersection. During the late 19th Century and early 20th Century, passenger and freight trains stopped in the small community. A grain elevator and stockyard were located nearby, serving the area farmers. Livestock was transported to and from the area. Other buildings in Mollie included the tile factory, grocery store, cider mill, and a blacksmith shop. In later years, the grocery store was described as a “general store”. A community as small as Mollie could not justify having a hospital. However, Mollie had at least one registered physician, Doctor H. B. Reed.

=== Railroad ===
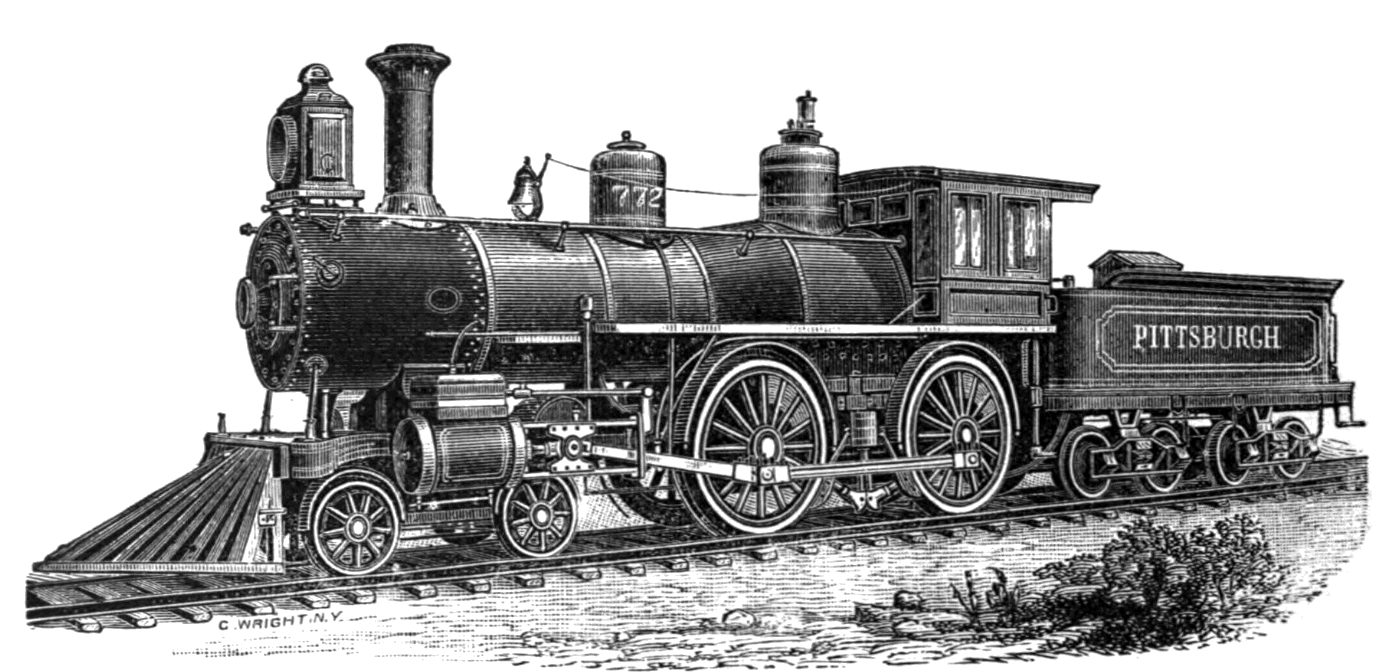
An 1890s locomotive.

Located in Mollie next to the intersection of the two county roads is a railroad line. This line was authorized in 1849, and connects the Indiana cities of Fort Wayne and Muncie—running through the Blackford County communities of Montpelier, Mollie, and Hartford City (see railroad map). Although work constructing the railroad line began in the 1850s, it was not completed (by connecting Fort Wayne to Muncie) until 1870. The original company was named Fort Wayne & Southern Railroad Company, but by the time the railroad began operations, it was named Fort Wayne, Cincinnati & Louisville Railroad. (Most of the "Louisville" part of the name can be seen on the railroad map herein.) The Lake Erie and Western Railroad acquired the Fort Wayne, Cincinnati & Louisville Railroad in 1890, and both names were used to describe the railroad during Mollie's more prosperous years. A short piece of railroad track branched off from the main line to enable the loading and unloading of railcars in Mollie. The Mollie "loading track" was listed in 1895 as having a length of 361 feet (110 m). Another short branch line, the 800-foot (240 m) Manhattan Oil spur, was located nearby. Although these branch lines have been removed, trains still operate over the main line.

Around 1905, an interurban line began running parallel to the railroad. The interurban, called the trolley by the locals, connected with Montpelier to the north and Hartford City to the south. Automobiles gradually replaced interurbans as the popular choice for passenger transportation. Blackford County's interurban was removed in the early 1940s.

== Notable people ==
Mollie's leading resident during the Indiana Gas Boom era was Jacob Burnworth, who moved to Blackford County in 1878. Burnworth also owned Mollie's two major enterprises: the grocery store and the tile factory. The building that housed the grocery also had additional purposes. The Mollie store also housed a small waiting station for the interurban and a post office. Burnworth served as the Mollie post master, and he was also a Justice of the Peace for Harrison Township. He died in 1917 at the age of 76.

== Decline ==
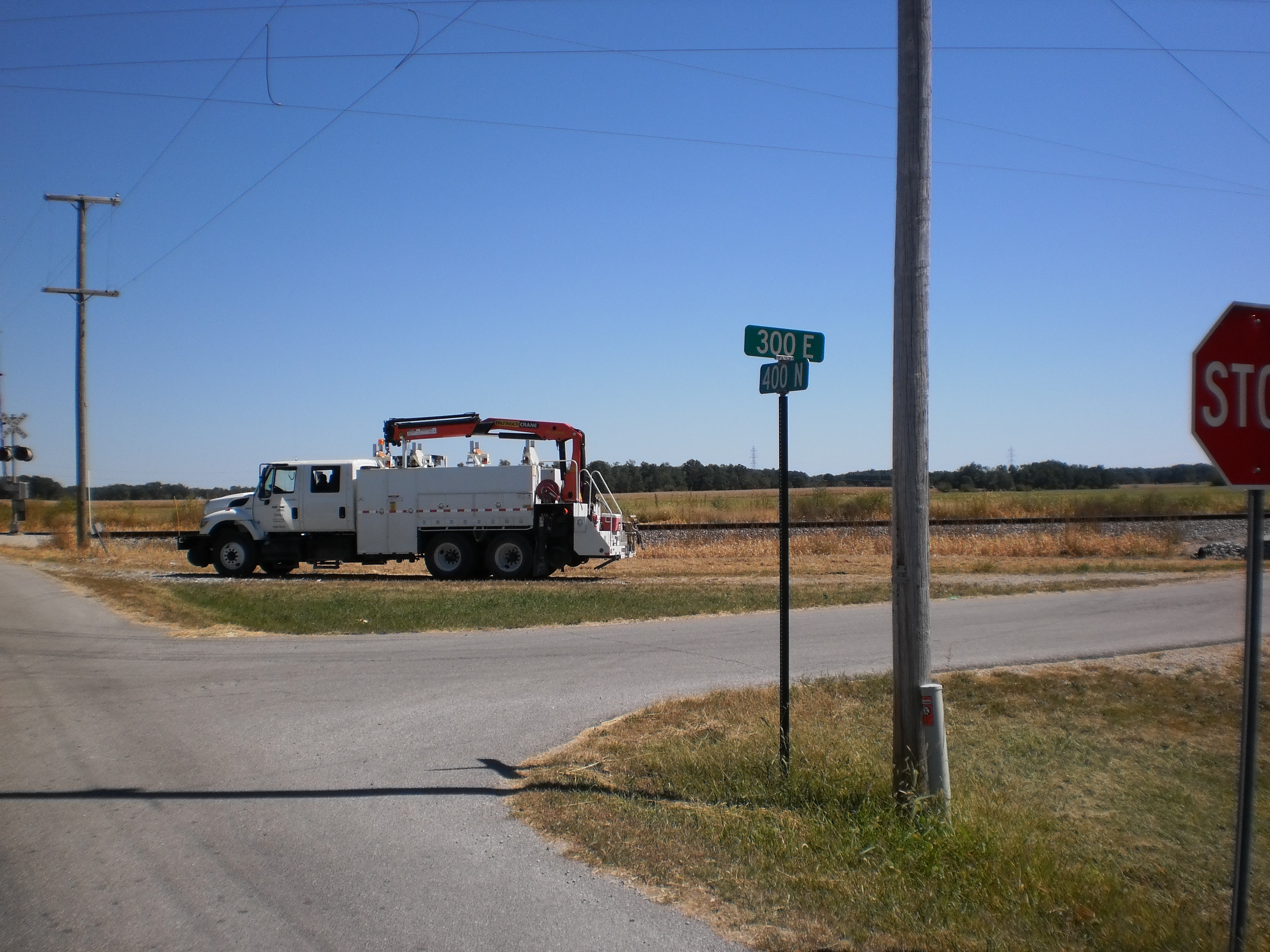
Site of extinct village named Mollie

At the beginning of the 20th century, the Indiana Gas Boom gradually came to an end. The end of the Gas Boom was difficult for many small communities, and it was a major cause of Mollie's decline. Unlike some communities, Mollie did not have manufacturers that were dependent upon the low-cost energy provided by the abundant natural gas. However, the loss of the oil workers in the nearby Harrison Township oil fields meant that consumer demand in Mollie was significantly diminished. By 1907, Mollie's Post Office was discontinued because of lack of demand—the oil workers had moved away. Elsewhere in the county, the gas and oil workers left, some of the manufacturers moved, and some of the service industries were forced to close or cut back. According to the United States Census, Blackford County's population peaked at 17,123 in 1900, and it still has not returned to that zenith 100 years later. Mollie was still listed on maps during the 1920s, but its decline was already two decades old.

Other contributors to Mollie's demise concerned Jacob Burnworth and his tile factory. Burnworth was Mollie's leading citizen and entrepreneur. He owned the town's general store (which also contained the interurban station), and tile factory. The clay used by the tile factory became depleted, and the tile factory was moved to Hartford City. Burnworth died August 12, 1917, at the age of 76.

A smaller factor to affect Mollie was the automobile. During the 20th Century, the quality of automobiles and roads improved—resulting in the decline of interurban lines and passenger service on the railroads. The last interurban train ran on January 18, 1941. Passenger service on the Lake Erie and Western Railroad line (owned by the Nickel Plate Road by that time) had already been discontinued in 1931. Many small towns, including Mollie, had started as stops on railroad lines. The automobile contributed to the decline of the railroad as a major provider of passenger transportation. It also changed “business and shopping patterns at the expense of the small-town merchant”.

In 1972, Mollie's population was down to 4 people, and the community consisted of two houses. A "Welcome to Mollie, pop. 4" sign was kept nearby for the amusement of passing motorists.

=== Remains of the site ===
The land once occupied by the Mollie community, located at the intersection of Blackford County roads 400 North and 300 East, is now farmland and owned privately. All commercial buildings have been demolished. Although the interurban line is gone, the railroad line is still in service. Norfolk Southern Railway owns and operates the railroad line, which still connects the cities of Montpelier and Hartford City with each other and points throughout North America. (See photo—the track was undergoing maintenance work at the time the picture was taken.)
