= Montpelier Carnegie Library =

- U.S. National Register of Historic Places
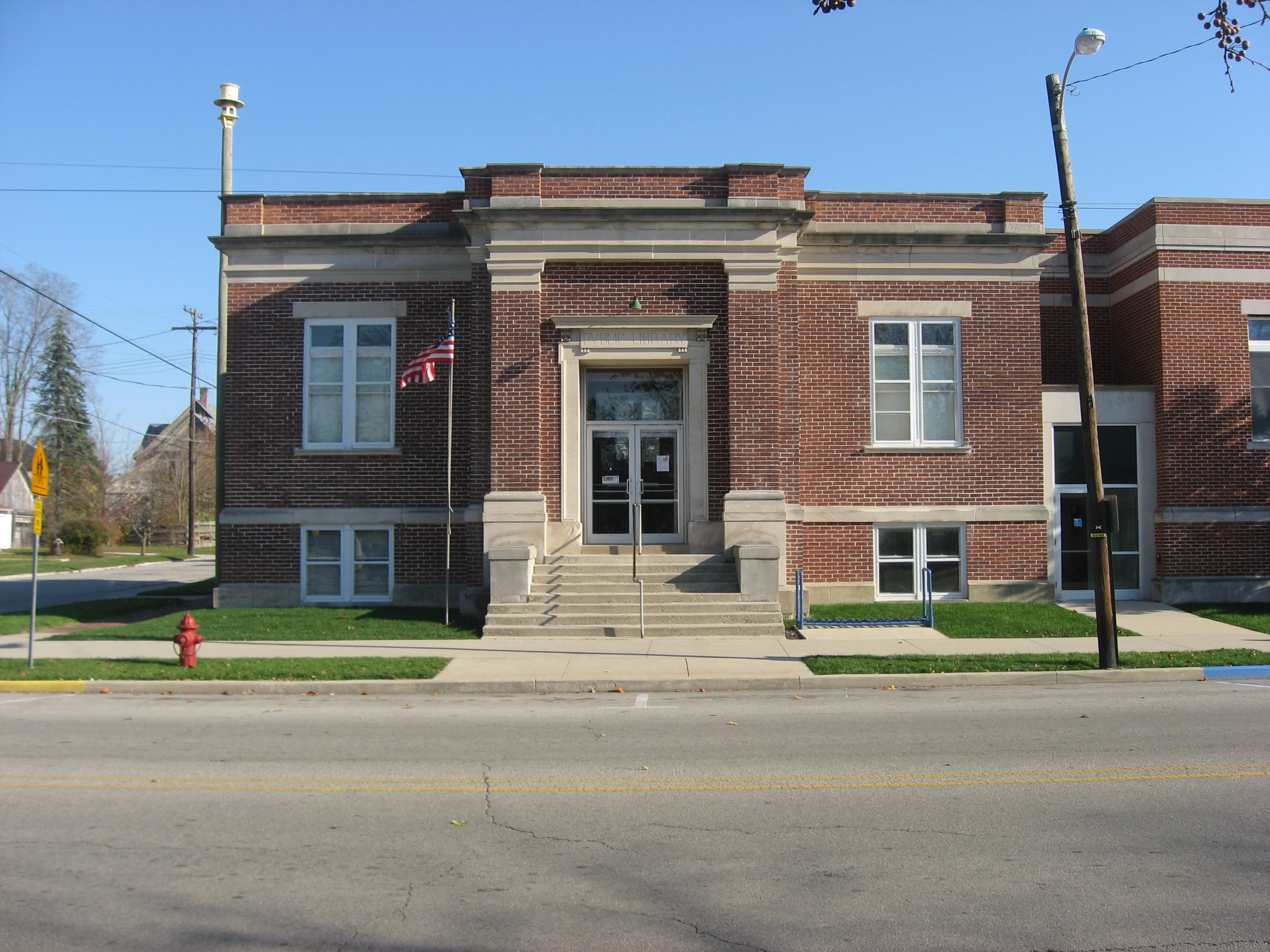

- Location within Blackford County, Indiana Location within Indiana Location within the United States
- Location: 301 S. Main St., Montpelier, Indiana
- Coordinates: 40°33′10″N 85°16′41″W
- Area: 0 acres (0 ha)
- Built: 1908, 1992
- Architect: Kibele, Cuno
- NRHP reference No.: 07000560
- Added to NRHP: June 22, 2007

Montpelier Carnegie Library, also known as the Public Library of Montpelier and Harrison Township, is a historic Carnegie library located at Montpelier, Indiana. It was built in 1908, and is a one-story, rectangular, brick and limestone building. A brick addition was erected in 1992. Its construction was funded with $10,000 from Andrew Carnegie.

It was listed on the National Register of Historic Places in 2007.

The public library is still in operation under the name Montpelier Harrison Township Public Library.
