= Lick (stream) =

Type of watercourse

A lick is a small watercourse or an ephemeral stream. It ranks hydrologically between a rill and a stream. "Lick" is primarily used in the Southern United States, including Big Bone Lick, in Kentucky.

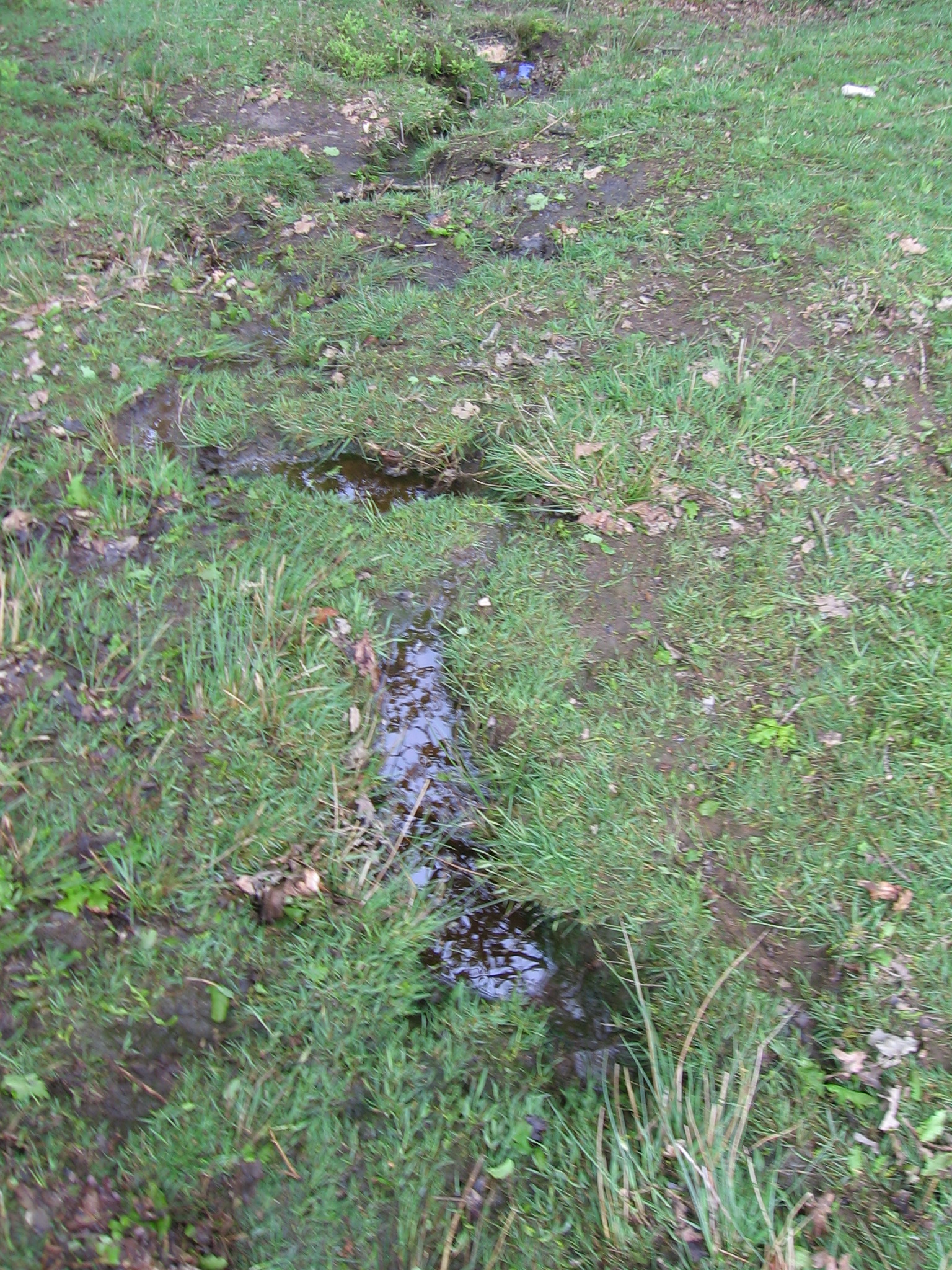
Picture of a rill in Holford Combe.

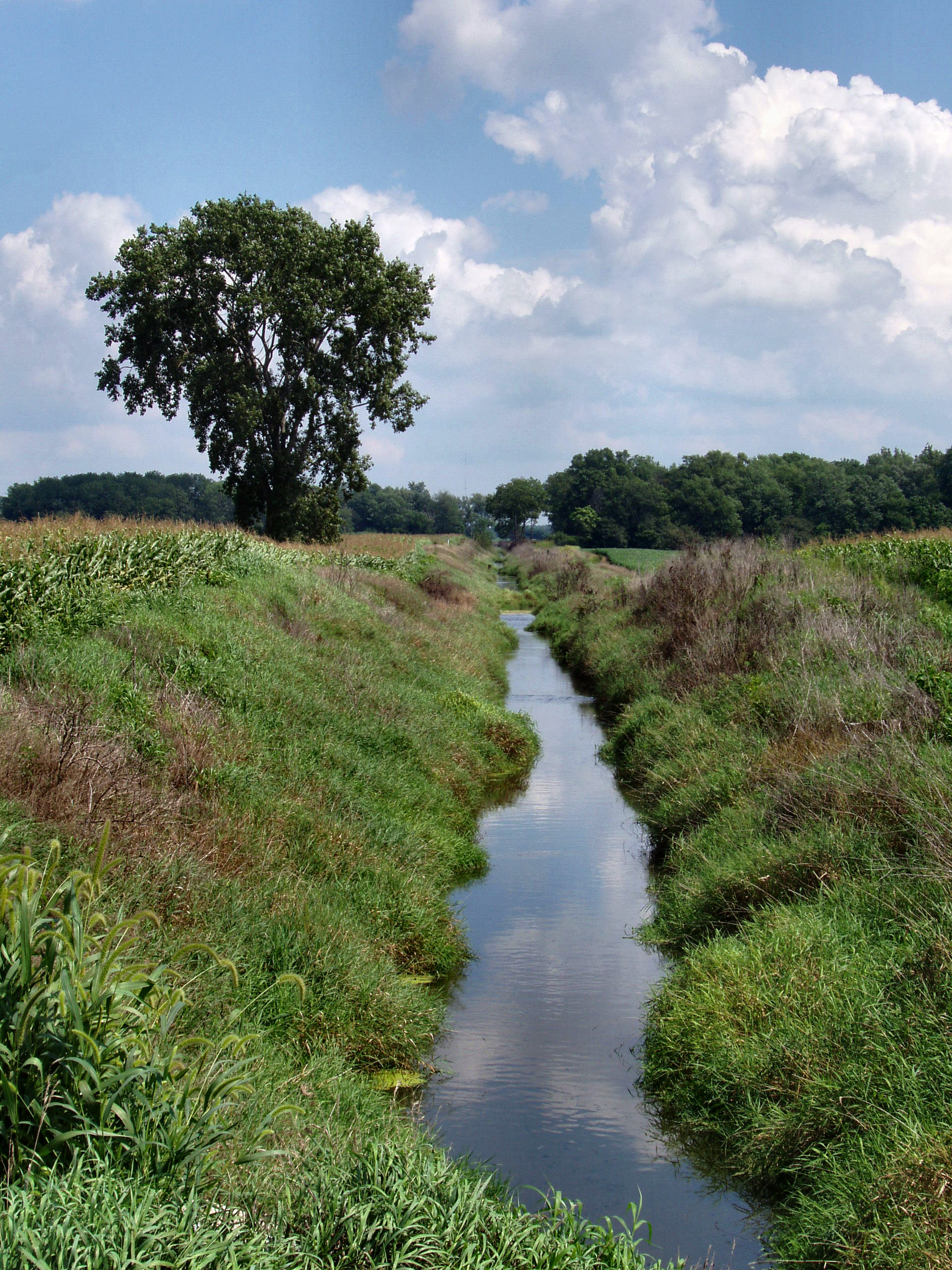
Yellow River in rural Indiana, USA. Rivers and streams of this size are often referred to as "creeks".

== See also ==
- Lick Branch
