= Matamoras, Indiana =

- Unincorporated community
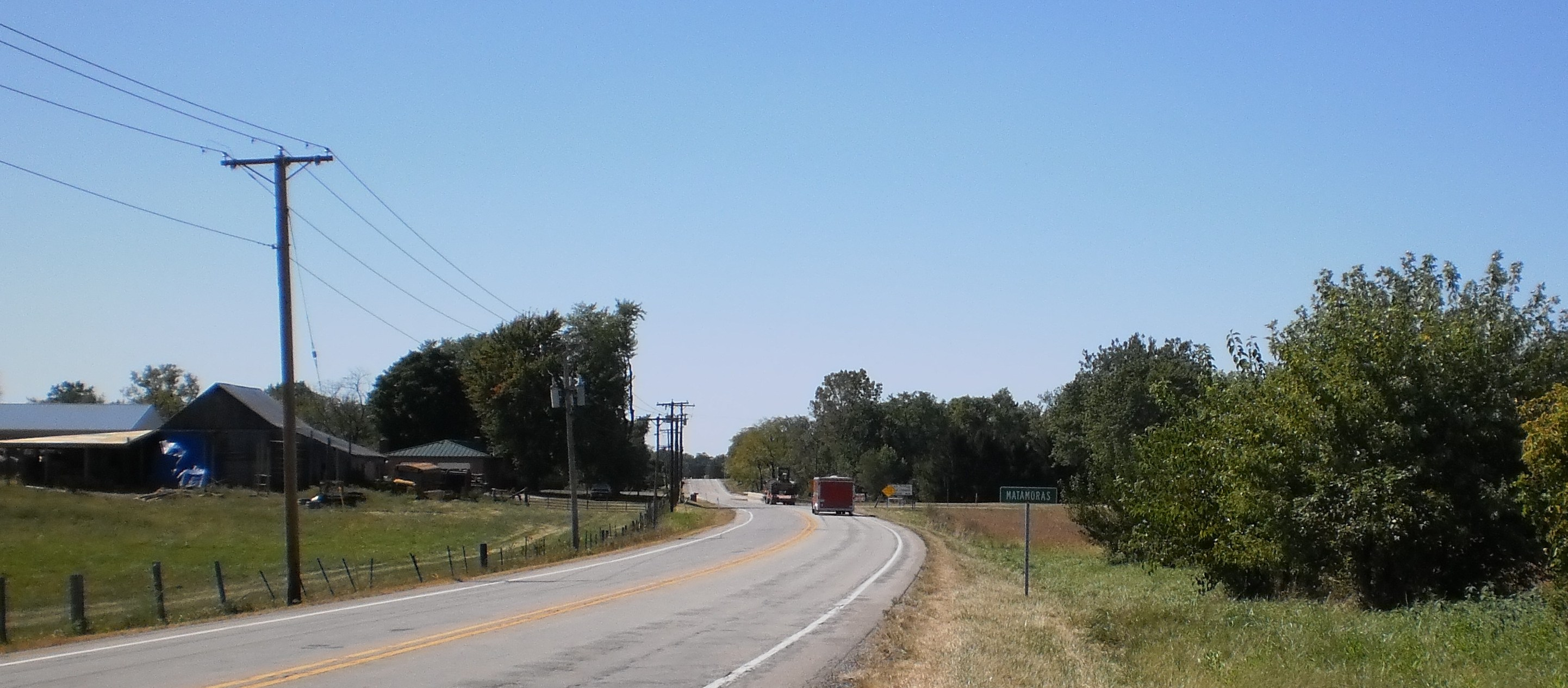
- West entrance of Matamoras, Indiana

- Blackford County's location in Indiana

- Location in Blackford County
- Coordinates: 40°33′15″N 85°15′47″W
- Country: United States
- State: Indiana
- County: Blackford
- Township: Harrison
- Established: circa 1833
- Elevation: 869 ft (265 m)
- Time zone: UTC-5 (Eastern (EST))
  - Summer (DST): UTC-4 (EDT)
- ZIP code: 47359
- Area code: 765
- FIPS code: 18-47550
- GNIS feature ID: 438709

Matamoras is an unincorporated community in the northeast portion of Harrison Township, Blackford County, in the U.S. state of Indiana. Matamoras is Blackford County's oldest community, although it was not the first to be platted.

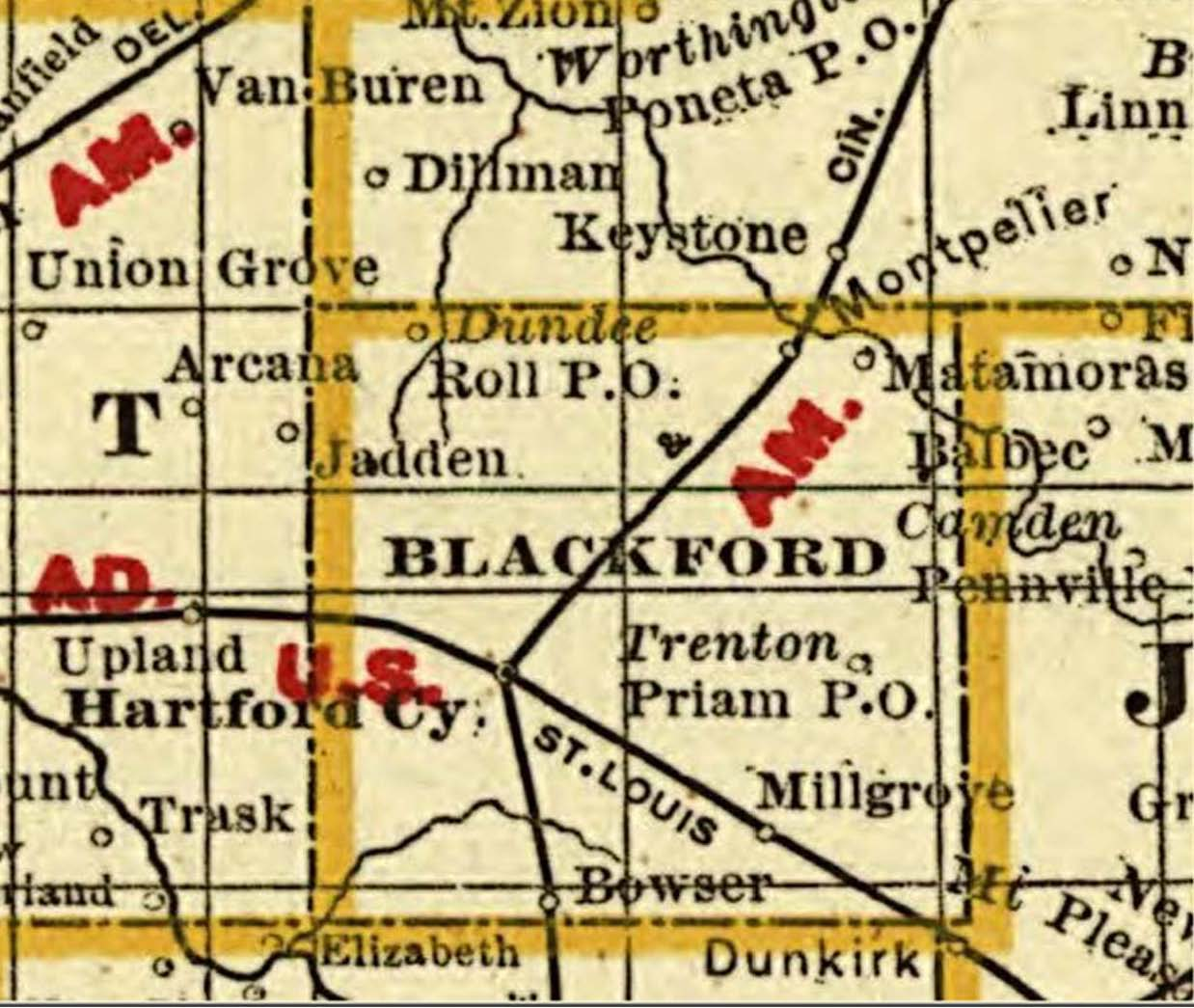
Blackford County, Indiana 1888

== Geography ==
Matamoras is located on the Salamonie River, less than one mile east of Montpelier.

== History ==
It was likely named after Matamoros, Mexico, a battleground in the Mexican–American War.
