= Harrison Township, Blackford County, Indiana =

Harrison Township
- Township
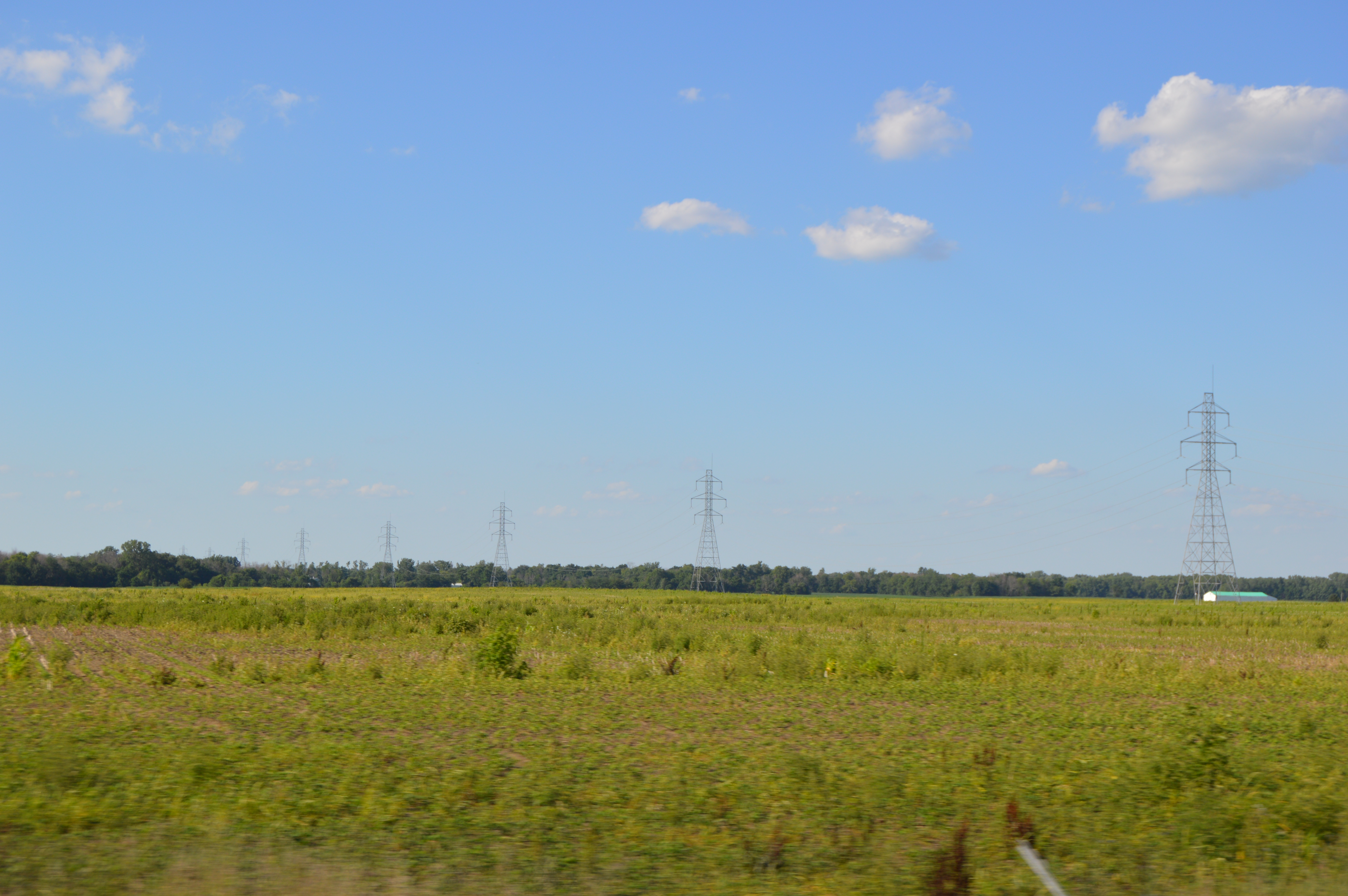
- Along State Road 18 west of Montpelier

- Location of Harrison Township in Blackford County
- Coordinates: 40°31′49″N 85°16′07″W
- Country: United States
- State: Indiana
- County: Blackford

Government
  - Type: Indiana township

Area
  - Total: 42.23 sq mi (109.4 km^{2})
  - Land: 42.13 sq mi (109.1 km^{2})
  - Water: 0.1 sq mi (0.26 km^{2})
- Elevation: 879 ft (268 m)

Population (2020)
  - Total: 2,353
  - Density: 55.85/sq mi (21.56/km^{2})
- FIPS code: 18-31630
- GNIS feature ID: 453378

Harrison Township is one of four townships in Blackford County, Indiana. As of the 2020 census, its population was 2,353 (down from 2,640 at 2010) and it contained 1,155 housing units. The township was named after William Henry Harrison, hero of the Battle of Tippecanoe, former governor of the Indiana Territory, and ninth President of the United States.

== Geography ==
According to the 2010 census, the township has a total area of 42.23 square miles (109.4 km^{2}), of which 42.13 square miles (109.1 km^{2}) (or 99.76%) is land and 0.1 square miles (0.26 km^{2}) (or 0.24%) is water. Lake Blue Water and the Godfrey Reserve are in this township. The Salamonie River runs through the township's northeast corner.

Map of Harrison Township

=== Cities and towns ===
- Montpelier

=== Unincorporated towns ===
- Dorsey's Station (ghost town)
- Matamoras
- Mollie (ghost town)
- Pleasantdale (ghost town)

=== Major highways ===
- SR 18

=== Cemeteries ===
The township contains at least eight cemeteries: Brookside, Independent Order of Odd Fellows, North Twibell, Penrod, Pleasantdale, South Twibell, St Margaret's Roman Catholic, and Woodlawn.
