= Montpelier, Indiana =

- City
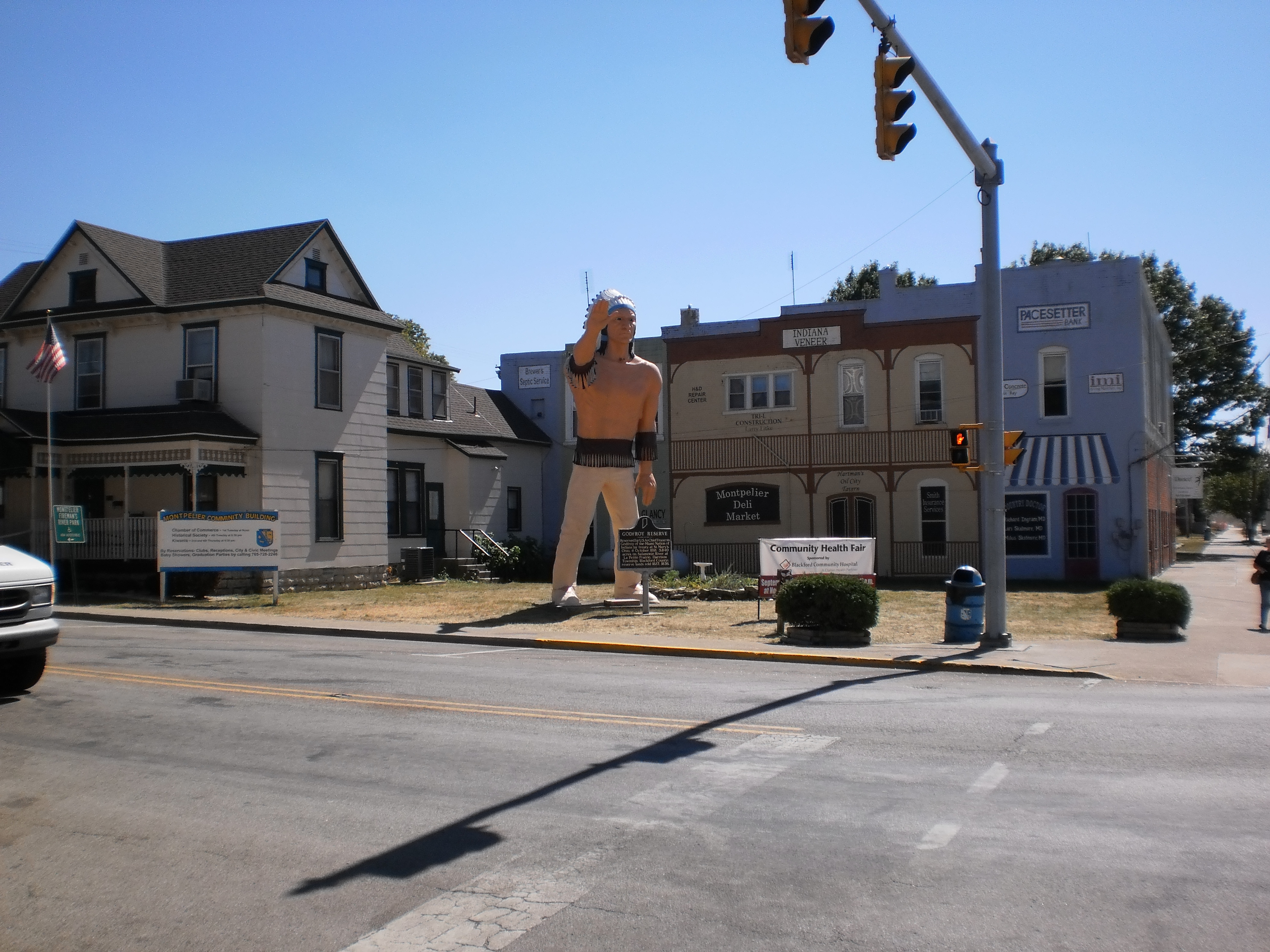
- Montpelier, Indiana

- Flag Logo
- Nickname: Oil City
- Motto: "A Great Place to Call Home"
- Location of Montpelier in Blackford County, Indiana.
- Coordinates: 40°32′59″N 85°17′13″W
- Country: United States
- State: Indiana
- County: Blackford
- Township: Harrison
- Settled: 1836
- Incorporated (town): 1870
- Incorporated (city): 1895

Government
  - Mayor: Bradley Neff

Area
  - Total: 1.49 sq mi (3.87 km^{2})
  - Land: 1.49 sq mi (3.87 km^{2})
  - Water: 0 sq mi (0.00 km^{2}) 0%
- Elevation: 879 ft (268 m)

Population (2020)
  - Total: 1,540
  - Estimate (2025): 1,506 ▼
  - Density: 1,029.7/sq mi (397.57/km^{2})
- Time zone: UTC-5 (EST)
  - Summer (DST): UTC-4 (EDT)
- ZIP code: 47359
- Area code: 765
- FIPS code: 18-50796
- GNIS feature ID: 2395388
- Website: montpeliercity.org

Montpelier /mɒntˈpiːliər/ is a city in Harrison Township, Blackford County, in the U.S. state of Indiana. This small rural community, the county's first to be platted, was established by settlers from Vermont, and is named after Vermont's capital city of Montpelier.

Montpelier was a central participant in the Indiana Gas Boom, as natural gas was discovered near the community in 1887. More importantly, the county's first successful oil well was drilled on the south side of Montpelier in 1890. Its population quickly grew from 808 in 1890 to about 6,500 by 1896. The Gas Boom, mostly an oil boom for Montpelier, gradually ended during the first decade of the 20th century.

Like many boom towns, the city's population has never matched that of the boom years. As of the 2020 census, Montpelier had a population of 1,540. However, the city's population stabilized many decades ago, and the community has multiple industries and an active community association. Montpelier is located near the former Godfroy Indian Reservation, and a statue of an Indian is featured prominently in the downtown district.

== History ==
In 1836 and 1837, several groups of settlers from Vermont moved to East Central Indiana, and settled on the high ground on the south side of the Salamonie River. Abel Baldwin, a veteran of the War of 1812, was the leader of this group of Vermont natives. They named their community Montpelier, after the capital of their original home state. Baldwin and his son-in-law, civil engineer John Cook, surveyed the area in 1836, and it was platted on September 5, 1837. The original plat had 16 blocks with a total of 154 lots.

At the time Montpelier was settled, it was part of Jay County. The western portion of Jay County was split away in 1838 to form Blackford County. Montpelier was not the first community in what would become Blackford County – a village named Matamoras existed earlier. However, Montpelier was platted first, and Matamoras was essentially a ghost town after the 1880s.

Beginning in September 1870, the Fort Wayne, Cincinnati & Louisville Railroad connected Fort Wayne with Muncie, Indiana, and Montpelier was (and still is) on this line. With dramatically improved transportation for the community, Montpelier became incorporated as a town at the end of 1870. By that time, the town had grown to a population of 231.

=== Gas Boom ===
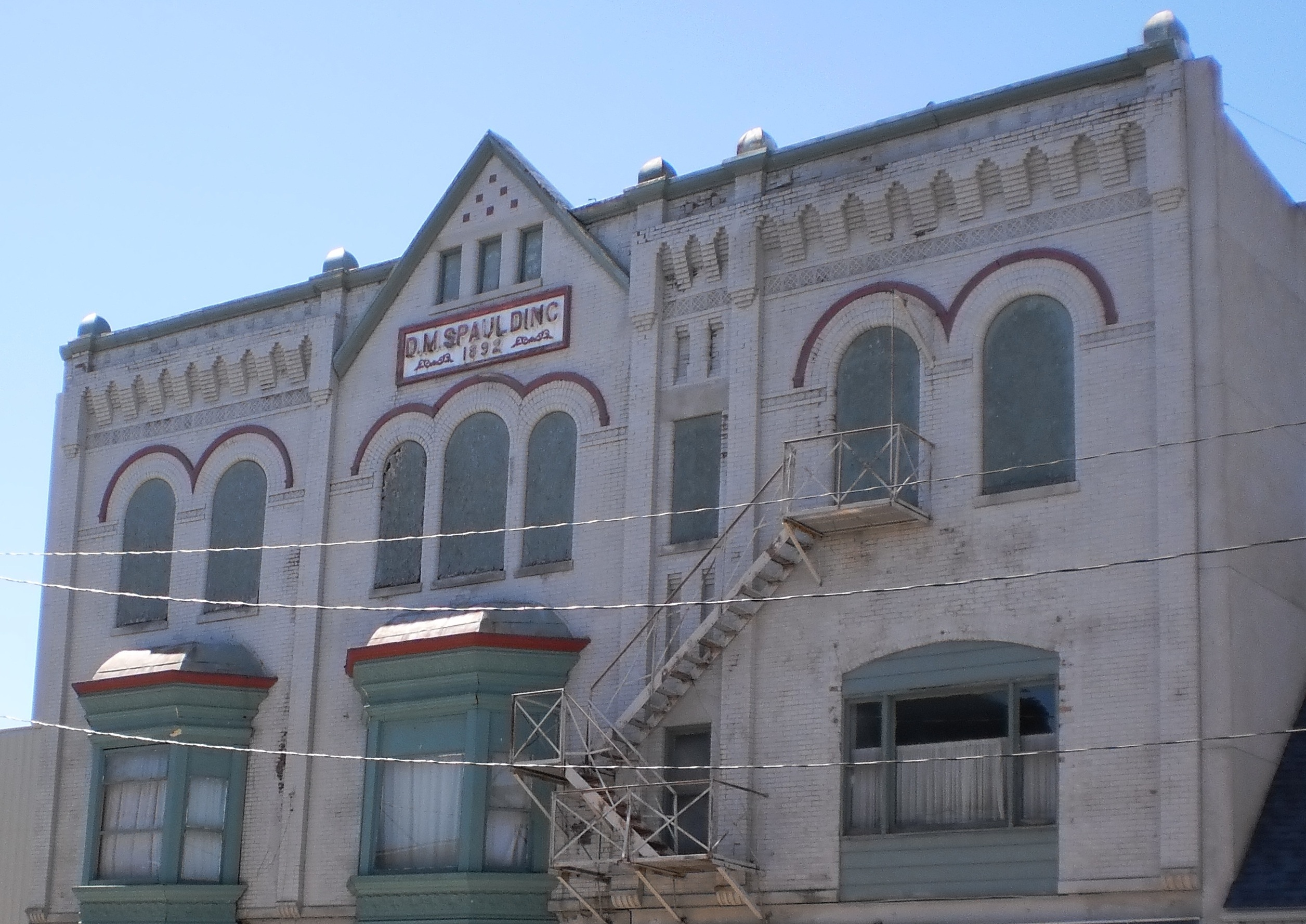
Spaulding building built during the Gas Boom

In 1887, natural gas was discovered in Blackford County, and the area began its participation in the Indiana Gas Boom. While natural gas was found throughout Blackford County, crude oil was found mostly in the county's Harrison Township, which includes Montpelier. Blackford County's first successful oil well, located just south of Montpelier, began producing during 1890. Montpelier was thought to be "the very heart of the greatest natural gas and oil field in the world". By the mid-1890s, about two-thirds of Harrison Township (25 square miles) was considered part of an oil-producing region. Montpelier became a city where “money and whiskey flowed frequently”, and numerous other “recreational activities” were available. Oil production from the Trenton Gas and Oil Field surrounding Montpelier began decreasing during the first decade of the 20th century, and the Gas Boom (or Montpelier's oil boom) gradually came to an end. Montpelier began a return to normalcy and its population (like many boom towns) has never exceeded its Gas Boom peak.

=== Dillinger ===
The Montpelier National Bank was robbed by three men on the afternoon of August 4, 1933. The robbery lasted about ten minutes, and no shooting was involved. The robbers quietly left town, driving east on Indiana State Road 18, without being followed. It was later determined, by the Federal Bureau of Investigation, that the robbers were John Dillinger and the Dillinger Gang.

== Geography ==
Montpelier is part of East Central Indiana and Northern Indiana. Future Northern Indiana, including what became Harrison Township and Montpelier, was flattened by two glaciers millions of years ago. These glaciers are also responsible for the rich Blackford County farmland, which includes the land surrounding Montpelier.

Located in the Harrison Township portion of Blackford County, Indiana, Montpelier is adjacent to the Salamonie River. It is located 40 miles (64 km) south of Fort Wayne, Indiana, and 75 miles (121 km) northeast of Indianapolis.

According to the 2010 census, Montpelier has a total area of 1.54 square miles (3.99 km^{2}), all land.

=== Nearby cities ===
- Bluffton (about 20 highway miles north)
- Hartford City (about 12 highway miles southwest)
- Marion (about 20 highway miles west)
- Portland (about 24 highway miles southeast)
- Upland (about 18 highway miles southwest)
- Dunkirk (about 15 highway miles southeast)

=== Climate ===
Montpelier has a typical Midwestern humid continental seasonal climate. There are four distinct seasons, with winters being cold with moderate snowfall, while summers can be hot and humid. The highest average temperature is in July at 84 °F (29 °C), while the lowest average temperature is in January at 18 °F (−8 °C). However, summer temperatures can top 90 °F (32 °C), and winter temperatures can drop below 0 °F (−17 °C). Average monthly precipitation ranges from about 2 to 4 inches (5 to 10 cm), with the heaviest occurring during June, July, and August. The highest recorded temperature was 103.0 °F (39.0 °C) on June 26, 1988, and the lowest recorded temperature was −26.0 °F (−32.0 °C) on January 19, 1994.

Climate data for Montpelier, Indiana
Month	Jan	Feb	Mar	Apr	May	Jun	Jul	Aug	Sep	Oct	Nov	Dec	Year
Mean daily maximum °F (°C)	33 (1)	38 (3)	49 (9)	62 (17)	72 (22)	81 (27)	84 (29)	82 (28)	76 (24)	65 (18)	50 (10)	38 (3)	61 (16)
Mean daily minimum °F (°C)	18 (−8)	22 (−6)	31 (−1)	41 (5)	50 (10)	60 (16)	63 (17)	62 (17)	54 (12)	43 (6)	34 (1)	23 (−5)	42 (5)
Average precipitation inches (mm)	1.96 (50)	1.94 (49)	2.79 (71)	3.37 (86)	3.81 (97)	4.33 (110)	4.28 (109)	4.05 (103)	2.88 (73)	2.48 (63)	3.37 (86)	2.70 (69)	37.96 (966)
Source: The Weather Channel

== Demographics ==
Historical population
Census	Pop.	Note	%±
1870	231		—
1880	618		167.5%
1890	808		30.7%
1900	3,405		321.4%
1910	2,786		−18.2%
1920	2,297		−17.6%
1930	1,859		−19.1%
1940	1,800		−3.2%
1950	1,826		1.4%
1960	1,954		7.0%
1970	2,093		7.1%
1980	1,995		−4.7%
1990	1,880		−5.8%
2000	1,929		2.6%
2010	1,805		−6.4%
2020	1,540		−14.7%
2025 (est.)	1,506		−2.2%
U.S. Decennial Census

Although Montpelier's peak population shown in the adjacent table (source: U.S. Census) is 3,405, the city is thought to have had over 6,500 residents around 1896 during the Indiana Gas Boom.

=== 2020 census ===
As of the 2020 census, Montpelier had a population of 1,540. The median age was 41.1 years. 22.8% of residents were under the age of 18 and 18.6% of residents were 65 years of age or older. For every 100 females there were 94.2 males, and for every 100 females age 18 and over there were 88.1 males age 18 and over.

0.0% of residents lived in urban areas, while 100.0% lived in rural areas.

There were 680 households in Montpelier, of which 27.9% had children under the age of 18 living in them. Of all households, 38.4% were married-couple households, 22.1% were households with a male householder and no spouse or partner present, and 30.0% were households with a female householder and no spouse or partner present. About 33.9% of all households were made up of individuals and 16.2% had someone living alone who was 65 years of age or older.

There were 788 housing units, of which 13.7% were vacant. The homeowner vacancy rate was 3.9% and the rental vacancy rate was 17.3%.

Racial composition as of the 2020 census
Race	Number	Percent
White	1,428	92.7%
Black or African American	10	0.6%
American Indian and Alaska Native	8	0.5%
Asian	3	0.2%
Native Hawaiian and Other Pacific Islander	0	0.0%
Some other race	10	0.6%
Two or more races	81	5.3%
Hispanic or Latino (of any race)	37	2.4%

=== 2010 census ===
At the 2010 census, there were 1,805 people, 708 households and 470 families residing in the city. The population density was 1,172.1 inhabitants per square mile (452.6/km^{2}). There were 823 housing units at an average density of 534.4 per square mile (206.3/km^{2}). The racial makeup of the city was 97.9% White, 0.3% African American, 0.3% Native American, 0.1% Asian, 0.2% from other races, and 1.2% from two or more races. Hispanic or Latino of any race were 0.9% of the population.

There were 708 households, of which 36.7% had children under the age of 18 living with them, 45.3% were married couples living together, 13.0% had a female householder with no husband present, 8.1% had a male householder with no wife present, and 33.6% were non-families. 29.4% of all households were made up of individuals, and 11.3% had someone living alone who was 65 years of age or older. The average household size was 2.55 and the average family size was 3.10.

The median age was 36.3 years. 28.1% of residents were under the age of 18; 8% were between the ages of 18 and 24; 25.2% were from 25 to 44; 25.3% were from 45 to 64; and 13.1% were 65 years of age or older. The sex makeup was 50.1% male and 49.9% female.

=== 2000 census ===
At the 2000 census, there were 1,929 people, 802 households and 539 families residing in the city. The population density was 1,757.9 inhabitants per square mile (678.7/km^{2}). There were 897 housing units at an average density of 817.4 per square mile (315.6/km^{2}). The racial makeup was 97.46% White, 0.10% African American, 0.31% Native American, 0.16% from other races, and 1.97% from two or more races. Hispanic or Latino of any race were 1.04% of the population.

There were 802 households, of which 32.3% had children under the age of 18 living with them, 50.9% were married couples living together, 11.2% had a female householder with no husband present, and 32.7% were non-families. 29.3% of all households were made up of individuals, and 12.7% had someone living alone who was 65 years of age or older. The average household size was 2.41 and the average family size was 2.95.

27.3% of the population were under the age of 18, 8.7% from 18 to 24, 28.6% from 25 to 44, 21.7% from 45 to 64, and 13.7% who were 65 years of age or older. The median age was 35 years. For every 100 females, there were 95.0 males. For every 100 females age 18 and over, there were 93.8 males.

The median household income was $30,175 and the median family income was $38,804. Males had a median income of $29,152 and females $21,402. The per capita income was $15,076. About 6.6% of families and 9.5% of the population were below the poverty line, including 9.0% of those under age 18 and 9.0% of those age 65 or over.

== Economy ==
Montpelier is located in a rural agricultural area, and has its own grain elevator. The city also has some manufacturing establishments, and its major businesses provide employment for over 400 people. These businesses include Emhart-Gripco, Smith Consulting, Indiana Veneer, BRC Rubber & Plastics, Indiana Box, and others. Montpelier also has a 50-acre industrial park.

== Culture ==
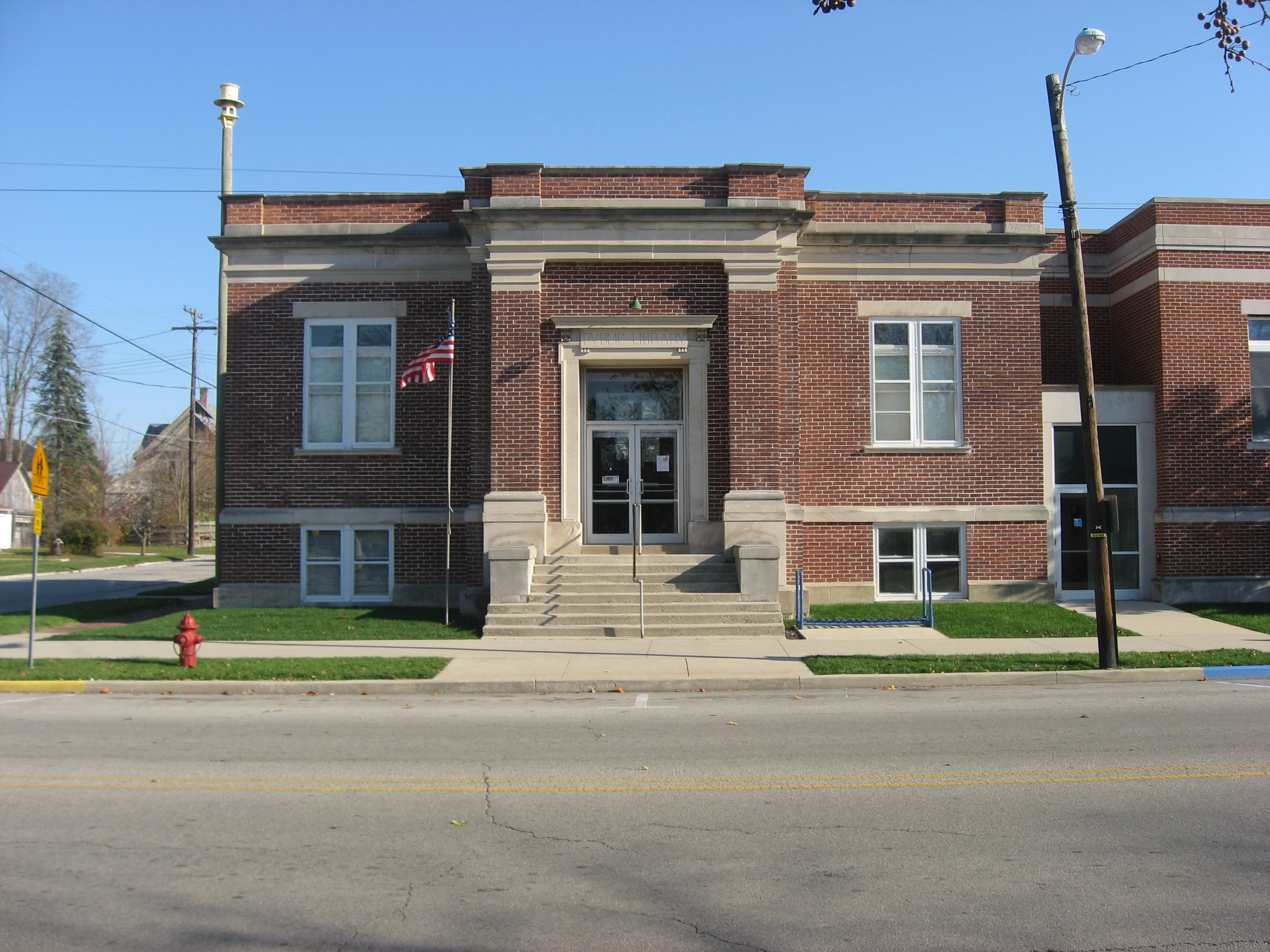
Montpelier's Carnegie Library

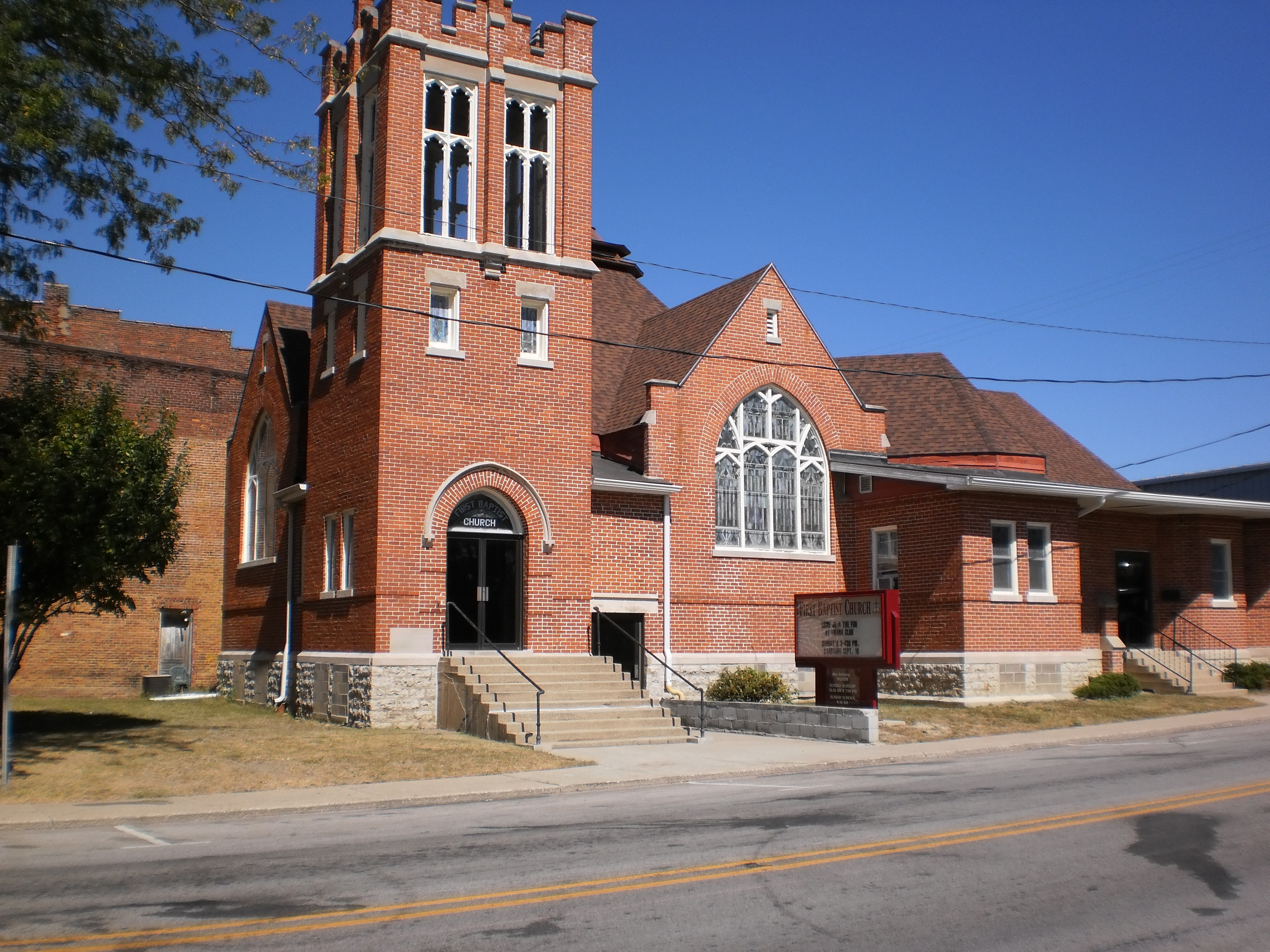
Montpelier's First Baptist Church

Montpelier has a long history of racing. During the 19th century, there were at least two race tracks for horses near Montpelier. Montpelier's own horse track was established in 1903. This track was very popular and drew crowds of 3,000. During the 1920s, a rebuilt track became known as the fastest half mile in Indiana. During the 1950s, the track became a stock car racing track, but reverted to horses in the 1960s. The track closed in 1973, but reopened in 1985 for stock car races and horse racing. Today, Montpelier Raceway features sanctioned stock car racing.

The Public Library of Montpelier and Harrison Township was built in 1907 and 1908. The building was made possible by a donation of $10,000 from philanthropist (and former business magnate) Andrew Carnegie. Built in the Classical Revival style of architecture, this building (under the historical name of Montpelier Carnegie Library) was added to the National Register of Historic Places in 2007. It is one of only three individual buildings in Blackford County listed in the National Register. (The county also has a Historic District.)

Montpelier's First Baptist Church was founded by Franklin Baldwin, brother of the leader of Montpelier's first settlers, Abel Baldwin. The congregation was organized in 1838. The present church building, located in downtown Montpelier, was constructed in 1907 and 1908. The building has been remodeled since that time.

High school basketball is very popular in Indiana, and Montpelier has been a strong participant. Despite its smaller size, Montpelier High School won five sectional basketball tournament championships. After a high school consolidation, Montpelier students began attending Blackford High School – and Blackford has won ten sectional championships. Additional sporting activities in Montpelier include Little League baseball, Tee Ball, and softball. Golfing, camping, and fishing are also available nearby.

The Montpelier Jamboree is an annual celebration that was first held in 1945. This Labor Day weekend celebration features musical acts, a Jamboree Queen contest, and other activities.

=== Miami Indians ===
The former Godfroy Reservation, an Indian reservation for Chief Francis Godfroy and Miami Indians from 1827 until 1836, is located on the Salamonie River near Montpelier. (Francis is the English pronunciation of Godfroy's real name François. The Indian pronunciation of François was Palonzwa.) Godfroy's father was French, and his mother was from the Miami tribe. A big man at six feet tall and 300 pounds, Godfroy was the last war chief of the Miami Nation. A sculpture of a Plains Indian stands in downtown Montpelier, donated by Chief Larry Godfroy. The sculpture was seen in the introductory montage on the television program Parks and Recreation. The “Ice Cream Giant” at the former Point Restaurant north of Montpelier was also featured in this clip.

== Politics ==
United States presidential election results for Montpelier, Indiana
Year	Republican		Democratic		Third party(ies)	
Year	No.	%	No.	%	No.	%
2008	110	40.89%	153	56.88%	6	2.23%
2012	253	45.92%	288	52.27%	10	1.81%
2016	70	66.04%	31	29.25%	5	4.72%
2020	412	71.03%	142	24.48%	26	4.48%
2024	406	73.68%	140	25.41%	5	0.91%

Up until recently, Montpelier was much more Democratic than Blackford County as a whole. It shifted strongly towards the Republican Party in the 2016 United States presidential election.

== Infrastructure ==
Montpelier had its own elementary school (closing in 2022), and high school students attend the county's Blackford High School. Five universities, including Ball State University and Taylor University, are located not more than 30 miles (48 km) from Montpelier.

The Norfolk Southern Railway provides freight railroad service connecting Montpelier to Fort Wayne and Indianapolis. This railroad, known as the Lake Erie and Western Railroad in the 1890s during the Gas Boom, was very important for the growth of Montpelier. Indiana Highway 18 runs through Montpelier, and Interstate 69 is 14 miles (23 km) west. The nearest airport with commercial flights is located 40 miles (64 km) north in Fort Wayne.

=== Major highways ===
- Indiana State Road 18
- Interstate 69 (14 miles (23 km) west of city)

== Notable people ==
- Annetta R. Chipp, temperance leader and prison evangelist
- David C. Ford, lawyer and member of the Indiana Senate
- Kevin A. Ford, NASA astronaut
- Lloyd Harris, Illinois state representative
