= Converse, Blackford County, Indiana =

Converse
- Unincorporated community
- Blackford County's location in Indiana

- Location in Blackford County
- Coordinates: 40°23′22″N 85°14′21″W
- Country: United States
- State: Indiana
- County: Blackford
- Township: Jackson
- Platted: 1867
- Elevation: 922 ft (281 m)
- Time zone: UTC-5 (Eastern (EST))
  - Summer (DST): UTC-4 (EDT)
- ZIP code: 47336
- Area code: 765
- FIPS code: 18-14970
- GNIS feature ID: 432906

Converse is an unincorporated community in Jackson Township, Blackford County, in the U.S. state of Indiana. Although not much of the community remains, the U.S. Geological Survey considers it a populated place. The community existed as a "flag" station along a railroad, and is named after railroad executive Joel N. Converse. Like many communities in Blackford County, this village declined after the end of the Indiana Gas Boom, which ended in the early 20th century.

== History ==
In 1837, Edward Crumley moved to the southeast corner of the Blackford County, and began a farm with his family. The area in this corner of the county would eventually be named Jackson Township. Crumley's farm was located at a crossroads, and the area became known as Crumley's Crossing. The crossroads area grew into a small community with several cabins, a blacksmith shop, and a sawmill. The Union and Logansport Railroad Company reached Blackford County in 1867, and the community became a flag stop on the railroad. The community was platted in 1867, and renamed for railroad executive Joel N. Converse. In addition to a sawmill and blacksmith shop, the community had a store, school, and church. The church was a Methodist church, but later became the Kingsley Full Gospel church. For this reason, the area is sometimes called by a third name, which is "Kingsley". Thus, Crumley's Crossing, Converse, and Kingsley all refer to the same place in Blackford County. Blackford County's Converse should not be confused with the town of Converse, which is located in Grant County.

=== Railroad ===
The railroad line that ran through Converse was named Union and Logansport Railroad Company by the time it entered Blackford County, and it was the county's first railroad. This line was proposed in 1862, and completed to Hartford City in 1867 — running through the Blackford County communities of Dunkirk, Converse, Millgrove, and Hartford City. Eventually, a stop named Renner was also added to the line west of Hartford City. Converse was a flag stop southeast of Millgrove. The railroad was eventually named Pittsburgh, Cincinnati and St. Louis Railroad. Other names for the railroad since that time include the Panhandle division of the Pennsylvania Railroad, Penn Central Transportation Company, Conrail, and Norfolk Southern Railway. The line is now abandoned between Converse and Hartford City.

== Geography ==
Converse is located in East Central Indiana, between Dunkirk and Hartford City. The northern half of Indiana, including what became Jackson Township and Converse, was flattened by two glaciers millions of years ago. These glaciers are also responsible for the rich Blackford County farmland. The region is agriculture-oriented. Soybeans and corn are the most popular crops grown in Blackford County, and over 65,000 acres are devoted to these two crops. Additional crops and livestock are also grown in the county. The Zip Code 47336 includes Dunkirk, Indiana, which is several miles to the east of Converse.

=== Climate ===
Converse/Crumley's Crossing has a typical Midwestern humid continental seasonal climate. There are four distinct seasons, with winters being cold with moderate snowfall, while summers can be warm and humid. The highest average temperature is in July at 74 °F (30 °C), while the lowest average temperature is in January at 26 °F (−8.0 °C). However, summer high temperatures average 86 °F (30 °C) in July, and winter low average temperatures are 18 °F (−8 °C) in January and February. Average monthly precipitation ranges from about 2 to 4 inches (5 to 10 cm), with the heaviest occurring during May, June, and July. The highest recorded temperature was 110.0 °F (43.3 °C) on July 14, 1936, and the lowest recorded temperature was −25.0 °F (−31.7 °C) on January 21, 1985.

Climate data for Dunkirk, Indiana — which is less than 2 miles southeast of Blackford County’s Converse, Indiana
| Month | Jan | Feb | Mar | Apr | May | Jun | Jul | Aug | Sep | Oct | Nov | Dec | Year |
|---|---|---|---|---|---|---|---|---|---|---|---|---|---|
| Mean daily maximum °F (°C) | 34 (1) | 36 (2) | 48 (9) | 61 (16) | 73 (23) | 82 (28) | 86 (30) | 84 (29) | 78 (26) | 65 (18) | 51 (11) | 37 (3) | 61 (16) |
| Mean daily minimum °F (°C) | 18 (−8) | 18 (−8) | 29 (−2) | 39 (4) | 50 (10) | 59 (15) | 63 (17) | 61 (16) | 53 (12) | 41 (5) | 32 (0) | 22 (−6) | 40 (5) |
| Average precipitation inches (mm) | 2.4 (61) | 1.9 (48) | 2.8 (71) | 3.6 (91) | 4.2 (110) | 4.0 (100) | 4.0 (100) | 3.5 (89) | 3.4 (86) | 2.9 (74) | 2.8 (71) | 2.5 (64) | 38 (965) |
Source: Weatherbase
