= Renner, Indiana =

Ghost town in Indiana, United States

- Ghost town
- Blackford County's location in Indiana

- Location in Blackford County
- Coordinates: 40°28′20″N 85°25′53″W
- Country: United States
- State: Indiana
- County: Blackford
- Township: Licking
- Elevation: 919 ft (280 m)
- Time zone: UTC-5 (Eastern (EST))
  - Summer (DST): UTC-4 (EDT)
- ZIP code: 47348
- Area code: 765
- FIPS code: 18-63765
- GNIS feature ID: 441895

Renner is an extinct American village in Indiana's Blackford County. Although Renner has been listed as a “populated place” by the U.S. Geological Survey, this description is misleading. (Note: A satellite view of Renner shows a road intersecting with rail line and one farm—no other housing.) Renner was a railroad stop on the Pittsburgh, Cincinnati and St. Louis Railroad. The land around the railroad stop was originally used to supply timber for railroad crossties, and eventually became a livestock farm. Housing for the families of the employees of the livestock farm was also located nearby. Although it is not known for certain, Renner is thought to have been named for railroad executive John W. Renner. Renner was an executive of the Pittsburgh, Cincinnati and St. Louis Railroad, and later the Pennsylvania Railroad, and retired with over 50 years of railroad experience. Another community, Rennerdale, Pennsylvania, was named in his honor in 1895.

The 530-acre (2.1 km^{2}) farm adjacent to the Renner railroad station was owned by Benjamin Johnson. It became known as the Renner Livestock Farm in the early 1890s, and produced prize-winning Hereford cattle, Hampshire hogs, and horses – including the horse “Poetry of Motion”, a champion show horse. Livestock were shipped from the Renner station, and the railroad made as many as four stops per day. In the early 1900s, the Renner station was considered one of the principal railroad stations in Blackford County.

In 1919, Johnson sold all the farm's livestock, and then sold the farm. The farm was purchased by Fred A. Stimson. Stimson had purchased some of the Renner Stock Farm's cattle, and returned them to the Renner Stock Farm. He successfully continued the farm's tradition of award-winning livestock. Early in 1927, Stimson sold the cattle, and general farming was practiced afterward. In 1937, the farm was sold to the Scripps Foundation in connection with Miami University (Oxford Ohio).

== History ==
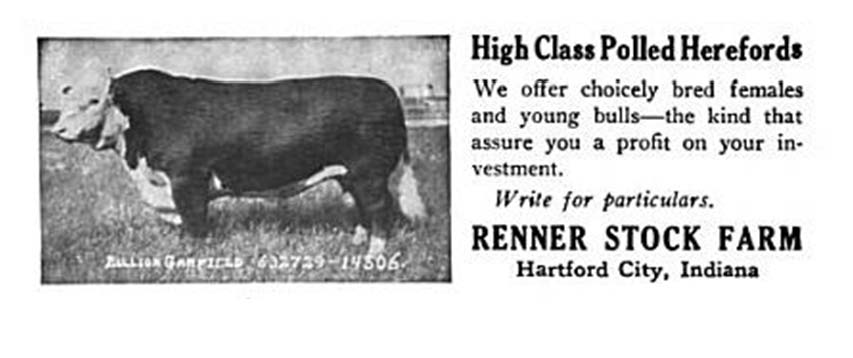
Renner Stock Farm advertisement

The Renner railroad stop was located in Blackford County's Licking Township, northwest of Hartford City. (See railroad map herein.) The Renner railroad station was used by the nearby Renner Stock Farm to ship livestock all over the world. Although the rail line came to Blackford County in 1867, the farm was not started until the early 1890s. The Renner Stock Farm is credited as the originator of the beef cattle breed of Polled Hereford known as the Bullion 4th.

=== Railroad ===
The railroad line that ran through Renner was named Union and Logansport Railroad Company by the time it entered Blackford County in 1867, and it was the county's first railroad. This line was proposed in 1862, and completed to Hartford City in 1867 — running through the Blackford County communities of Dunkirk, Converse, Millgrove, Hartford City, and eventually Renner. The railroad was eventually named Pittsburgh, Cincinnati and St. Louis Railroad. Other names for the railroad since that time include the Panhandle division of the Pennsylvania Railroad, Penn Central Transportation Company, Conrail, and Norfolk Southern Railway. The line is now abandoned east of Hartford City, but still in place west of the city through Renner to Upland, Indiana.

== Geography ==
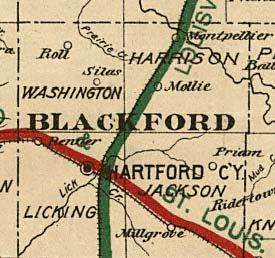
Blackford County railroads 1890s

Renner is in East Central Indiana, northwest of Hartford City. The northern half of Indiana, including what became Licking Township and Renner, was flattened by two glaciers millions of years ago. These glaciers are also responsible for the rich Blackford County farmland. The region is still agriculture-oriented. Soybeans and corn are the most popular crops grown in Blackford County, and over 65,000 acres (260 km^{2}) are devoted to these two crops. Additional crops and livestock are also grown in the county. A farm still exists in the area, and can be seen via satellite, but the railroad station is gone.

=== Major highways ===
- Interstate 69 (approximately 7 miles (11 km) west)

=== Adjacent cities ===
- Upland (about 4 highway miles west)
- Hartford City (about 5 highway miles southeast)
- Gas City (about 10 highway miles west)
- Marion (about 18 highway miles northwest)
- Muncie (about 26 highway miles southeast)
