= Millgrove, Indiana =

- Unincorporated community Census designated place
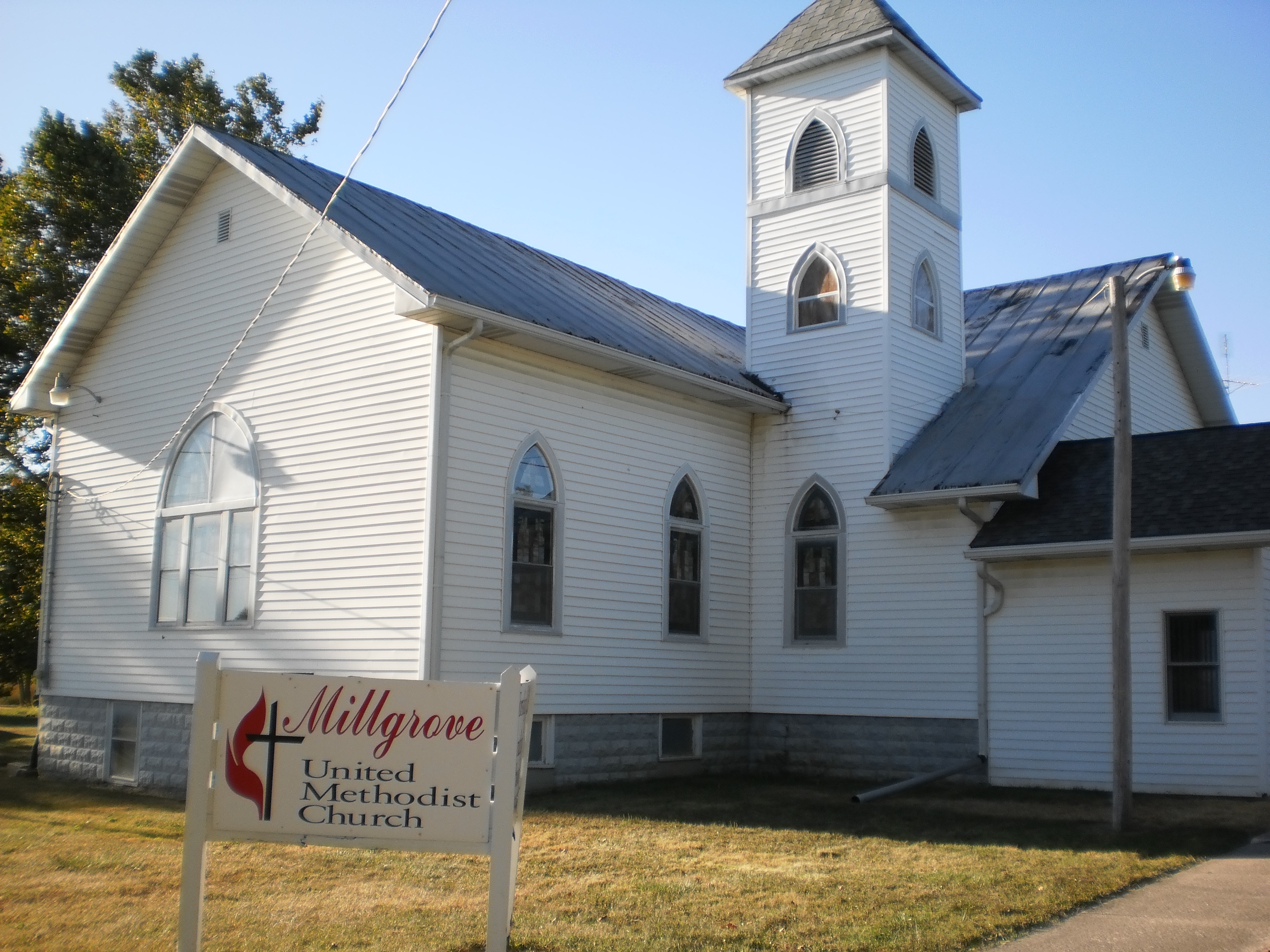
- Historic Methodist Church in Millgrove, Indiana

- Blackford County's location in Indiana

- Location in Blackford County
- Coordinates: 40°24′18″N 85°16′40″W
- Country: United States
- State: Indiana
- County: Blackford
- Township: Jackson
- Established: 1867
- Elevation: 932 ft (284 m)
- Time zone: UTC-5 (Eastern (EST))
  - Summer (DST): UTC-4 (EDT)
- ZIP code: 47348
- Area code: 765
- FIPS code: 18-49626
- GNIS feature ID: 2830320

Millgrove is an unincorporated community in Jackson Township, Blackford County, in the U.S. state of Indiana. Nearly all of the community's businesses have been closed for many years. Although the Blackford County Historical Society lists this community as a ghost town, homes are still maintained in the area.

Like several other communities in the county, Millgrove originally thrived as a stop on a railroad line. Millgrove also participated in the Indiana Gas Boom, and the Millgrove Natural Gas Company was one of Blackford County's many gas companies that existed during the 1890s. The Gas Boom gradually ended during the beginning of the 20th century, and many small communities never recovered. During the next few decades, the quality of automobiles and roads improved—indirectly contributing to the decline of many small communities as consumers drove to larger cities, and railroads declined in importance.

== Demographics ==
The United States Census Bureau defined Millgrove as a census designated place in the 2022 American Community Survey.

== History ==
Millgrove was laid out in 1867 when Blackford County's first railroad came through the southern portion of the county. The community's post office opened February 25, 1868, and continued until March 31, 1955. An 1882 gazetteer, which listed the community as "Mill Grove", called the town "a place of 50 inhabitants". The gazetteer also listed a physician, justice, and railroad agent. During the 1880s, Millgrove had three general stores, a blacksmith shop, a sawmill, and a tile factory.

During the next decade, a glass factory was built. Millgrove's glass factory was one of 15 glass factories that have existed in Blackford County, and most of these factories existed during the Indiana Gas Boom. (There were numerous glass and gas companies in the county at that time.) Eleven more glass factories have existed in nearby Dunkirk, Indiana. The Millgrove Glass Company was incorporated in 1898, and made glass containers. Originally, the company took advantage of the abundant supply of natural gas for a source of fuel. By 1905, the supply of natural gas in the region was diminishing, and the Millgrove Glass Company used gas made from coal in addition to natural gas. The factory closed in 1911, and this was thought to be “a severe blow to Millgrove”. A Blackford County directory from that time lists over 150 people living in Millgrove.

=== Railroad ===
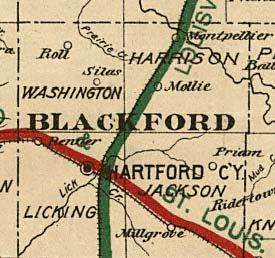
Railroad map of Blackford County 1890s

The railroad line that ran through Millgrove was named Union and Logansport Railroad Company by the time it entered Blackford County, and it was the county's first railroad. This line was proposed in 1862, and completed to Hartford City in 1867—running through the Blackford County communities of Dunkirk, Converse, Millgrove, Hartford City, and Renner The railroad was eventually named Pittsburgh, Cincinnati and St. Louis Railroad. Other names for the railroad since that time include the Panhandle division of the Pennsylvania Railroad, Penn Central Transportation Company, Conrail, and Norfolk Southern Railway. The line is now abandoned between the Blackford County communities of Converse and Hartford City, including the track that ran by Millgrove.

== Geography ==
Located in the Jackson Township portion of Blackford County, Millgrove is situated on a former railroad line. The community is located 60 miles (97 km) south of Fort Wayne and 80 miles (130 km) northeast of Indianapolis.

Millgrove is part of East Central Indiana and Northern Indiana. Future Northern Indiana, including what became Jackson Township and Millgrove, was flattened by two glaciers millions of years ago. These glaciers are also responsible for the rich Blackford County farmland, which includes the land surrounding Millgrove.

=== Nearby cities ===
- Dunkirk (about 6 highway miles southeast)
- Hartford City (about 8 highway miles northwest)
- Eaton (about 8 highway miles southwest)
- Portland (about 20 highway miles west)
- Upland (about 16 highway miles northwest)

=== Climate ===
Millgrove has a typical Midwestern humid continental seasonal climate. There are four distinct seasons, with winters being cold with moderate snowfall, while summers can be warm and humid. The highest average temperature is in July at 84 °F (29 °C), while the lowest average temperature is in January at 15 °F (−9 °C). However, summer temperatures can top 90 °F (32 °C), and winter temperatures can drop below 0 °F (−17 °C). Average monthly precipitation ranges from about 2 to 4 inches (5 to 10 cm), with the heaviest occurring during May, June, and July. The highest recorded temperature was 110.0 °F (43.3 °C) on July 14, 1936, and the lowest recorded temperature was −25.0 °F (−31.7 °C) on January 21, 1985.

Climate data for Millgrove, Indiana
Month	Jan	Feb	Mar	Apr	May	Jun	Jul	Aug	Sep	Oct	Nov	Dec	Year
Mean daily maximum °F (°C)	32 (0)	37 (3)	48 (9)	60 (16)	71 (22)	80 (27)	84 (29)	82 (28)	76 (24)	64 (18)	50 (10)	38 (3)	60 (16)
Mean daily minimum °F (°C)	15 (−9)	18 (−8)	28 (−2)	38 (3)	49 (9)	58 (14)	62 (17)	59 (15)	50 (10)	39 (4)	31 (−1)	21 (−6)	39 (4)
Average precipitation inches (mm)	1.89 (48)	1.84 (47)	2.69 (68)	3.50 (89)	4.06 (103)	4.42 (112)	4.40 (112)	3.65 (93)	3.02 (77)	2.62 (67)	3.23 (82)	2.58 (66)	37.9 (964)
Source: The Weather Channel
