= Indiana State Road 167 =

State highway in Indiana, United States

State Road 167
- SR 167 highlighted in red

Route information
- Maintained by INDOT
- Length: 10.371 mi (16.691 km)
- Existed: 1931–present

Major junctions
- South end: SR 67 at Albany
- North end: SR 26 near Hartford City

Location
- Country: United States
- State: Indiana
- Counties: Blackford, Delaware, Jay

Highway system
- Indiana State Highway System; Interstate; US; State; Scenic
← SR 166	→ SR 168

State Road 167 (SR 167) is a State Road in the eastern section of the state of Indiana. Running for 10.371 miles (16.691 km) in a general north–south direction, connecting the cities of Albany and Dunkirk with SR 26. The entire route is rural two-lane highway that passes through farmland and residential properties. SR 167 was originally introduced in the 1931 routed along its modern routing. The entire was paved by the mid-1960s.

== Route description ==
SR 167 begins at an intersection between Walnut Street (SR 67) and Mississinewa Avenue, in the city of Albany in Delaware County. From there the road continues northeast on Mississinewa Avenue through a mix of residential neighborhoods and farmland for about one mile (1.6 km) before leaving the city of Albany. After leaving Albany SR 167 enters unincorporated Delaware County, passing through rural farmland as a two-lane highway. The road enters Dunkirk following Main Street, passing through the downtown of the city. The street crosses a Norfolk Southern Railway track, before leaving downtown Dunkirk. North of downtown Main Street curves due north near the West Jay County Middle School and forms the border between Blackford and Jay Counties. The SR 167 designation ends at an intersection with SR 26 east of Hartford City, but the roadway continues north as a county road.

No segment of State Road 167 in Indiana is included in the National Highway System (NHS). The NHS is a network of highways that are identified as being most important for the economy, mobility and defense of the nation. The highway is maintained by the Indiana Department of Transportation (INDOT) like all other state roads in the state. The department tracks the traffic volumes along all state roads as a part of its maintenance responsibilities using a metric called average annual daily traffic (AADT). This measurement is a calculation of the traffic level along a segment of roadway for any average day of the year. In 2013, the department's traffic surveys showed that on average, 4324 vehicles used the highway daily along Main Street on the south end of Dunkirk and 784 vehicles did so each day near the northern end of SR 167, the highest and lowest counts along the highway, respectively.

== History ==
SR 167 was first designated in 1931. The original routing started in Albany and ran north through Dunkirk to SR 26 much as it does today. The entire road was either gravel or stone surface, until 1940 when the state highway commissioned desired to paved the road south of Dunkirk. This paving was completed by 1942. The segment of road north of Dunkirk was paved between 1962 and 1963.

== Major intersections ==
County	Location	mi	km	Destinations	Notes
Delaware	Albany	0.000	0.000	SR 67 / Truck SR 28 – Redkey, Muncie	Southern terminus of SR 167; roadway continues south as Truck SR 28
Blackford–Jay county line	Jackson–Knox township line	10.371	16.691	SR 26 – Hartford City	Northern terminus of SR 167; roadway continues north as 875 East/1200 West
1.000 mi = 1.609 km; 1.000 km = 0.621 mi
