= Hoover Park, Indiana =

Hoover Park
- Blackford County's location in Indiana
- Coordinates: 40°27′15″N 85°21′40″W
- Country: United States
- State: Indiana
- County: Blackford
- Township: Licking
- Elevation: 919 ft (280 m)
- Time zone: UTC-5 (Eastern (EST))
  - Summer (DST): UTC-4 (EDT)
- ZIP code: 47348
- Area code: 765
- GNIS feature ID: 452053

Hoover Park is a playground on the east side of Hartford City, Indiana. Hartford City is the county seat of Blackford County, Indiana. The park celebrated its 100th anniversary in 2016.

== Geography ==
Hoover Park is located at an elevation of 919 feet (280 m) above sea level. The park is located on Mill Street between Grant and Elm Streets, in Hartford City, Indiana.
