= Trenton, Indiana =

- Unincorporated town
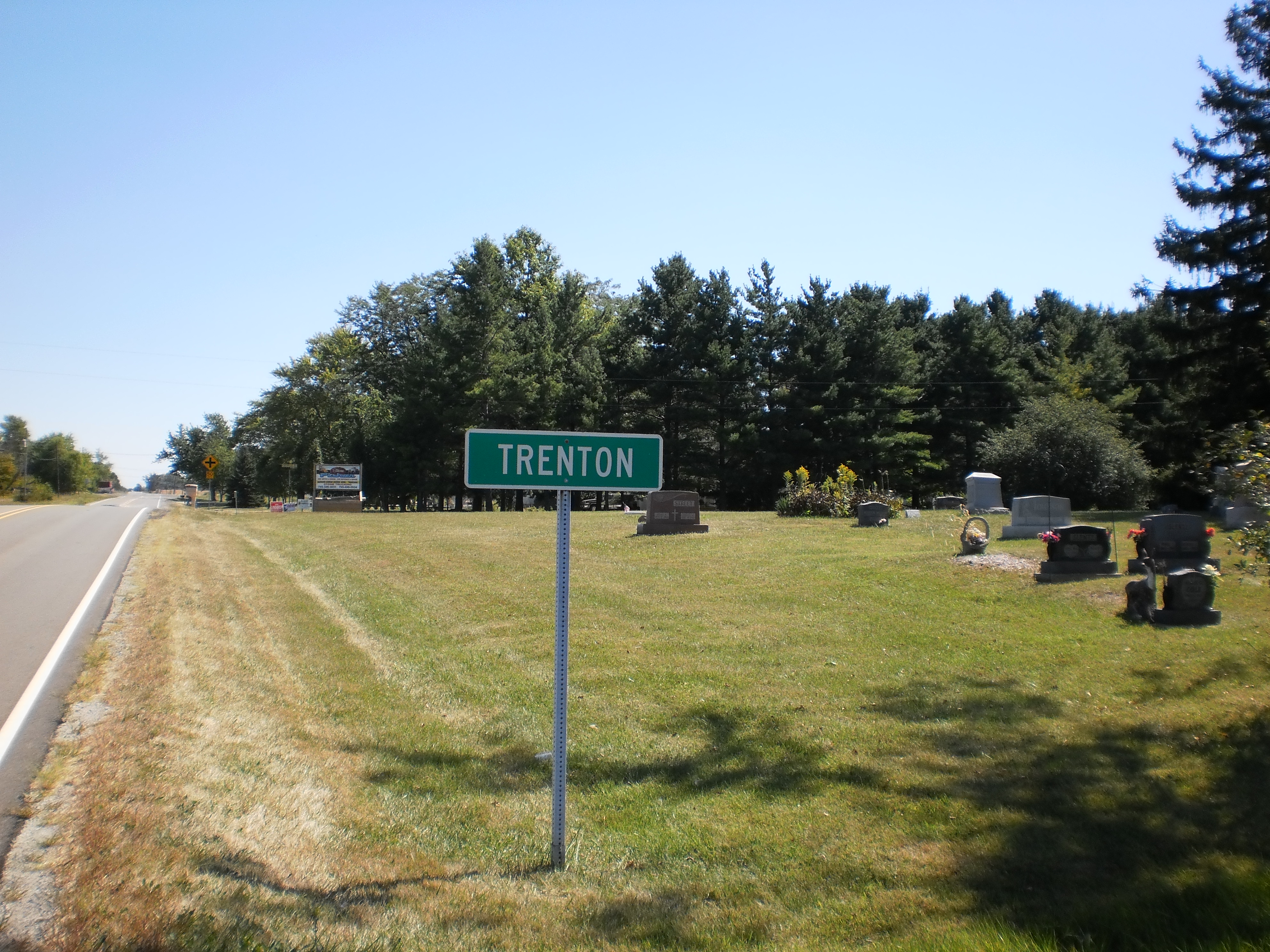
- Trenton, Indiana

- Blackford County's location in Indiana

- Location in Blackford County
- Coordinates: 40°27′00″N 85°14′20″W
- Country: United States
- State: Indiana
- County: Blackford
- Township: Jackson
- Established: 1847
- Elevation: 899 ft (274 m)
- Time zone: UTC-5 (Eastern (EST))
  - Summer (DST): UTC-4 (EDT)
- ZIP code: 47348
- Area code: 765
- FIPS code: 18-76436
- GNIS feature ID: 444871

Trenton is an unincorporated town in Jackson Township, Blackford County, in the U.S. state of Indiana. Nearly all of the community's businesses have been closed for many years. Although the Blackford County Historical Society lists this community as a ghost town, homes are still maintained in the area.

Trenton is located east of Hartford City on Indiana State Road 26. Platted in 1845, it is one of the older communities in Blackford County. The community had its own Post Office from 1856 until 1907. Because there was another Trenton in Randolph County during the 19th century, Blackford County's Trenton post office used the name Priam. Therefore, many older maps show the community as "Priam" instead of Trenton.

Trenton participated in the Indiana Gas Boom, and had two of Blackford County's many gas companies (Marion Creek Natural Gas Company and Trenton Natural Gas Company) that existed during the 1890s. The Gas Boom gradually ended during the beginning of the 20th century, and many small communities never recovered. During the next few decades, the quality of automobiles and roads improved—indirectly contributing to the decline of many small communities as consumers drove to larger cities.

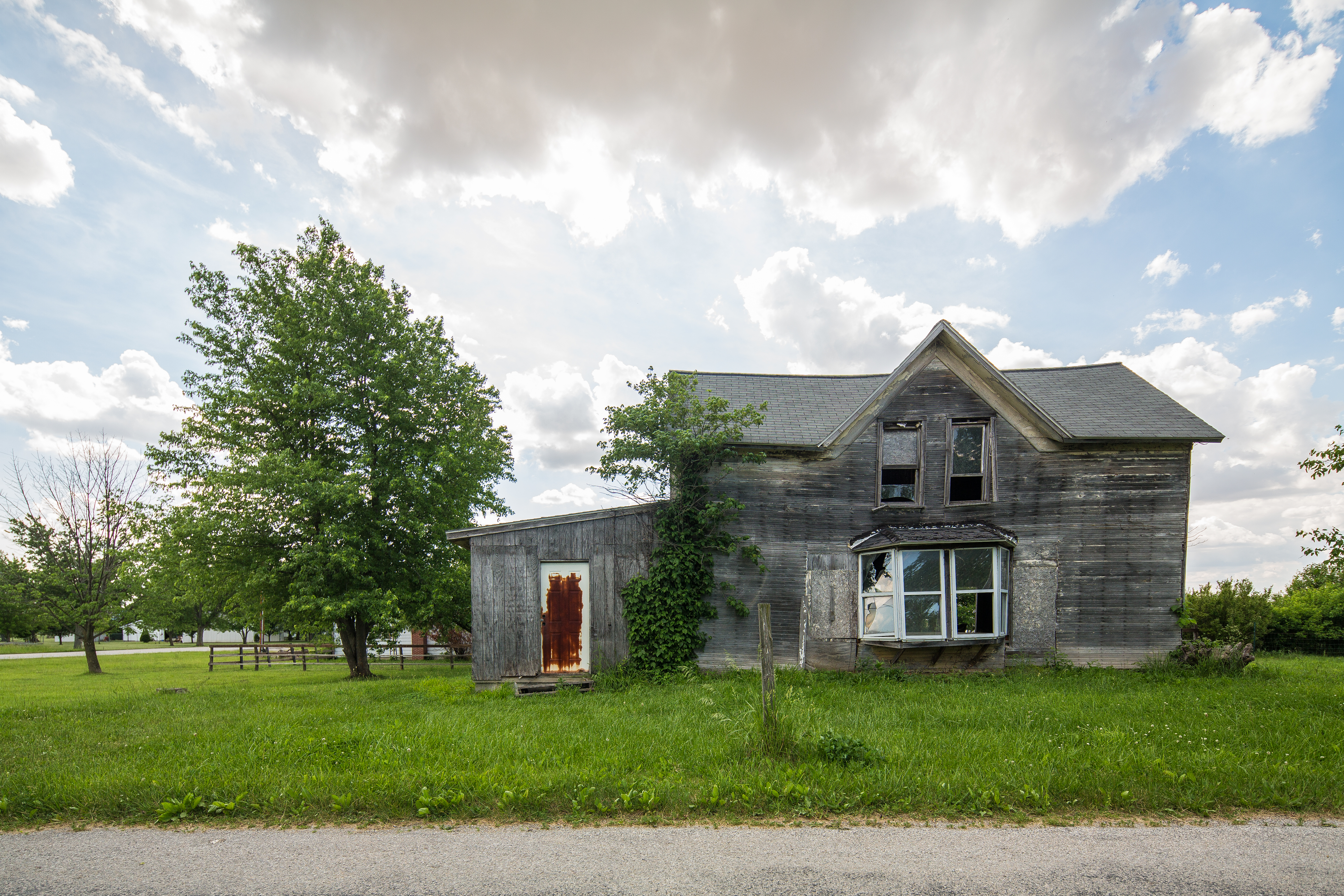
Trenton, Indiana

== History ==
Trenton is located in Jackson Township in Blackford County. Jackson Township's population was only 154 in 1840, as there was no rail connection and the land suffered from poor drainage. Trenton was platted on January 20, 1845, by Robert H. Laning, Ezekiel Laning, Basel Anderson and William Cortright. Cortright was the landowner.

When Blackford County's railroads were constructed in the late 1860s, Trenton was bypassed—as the nearest rail line was four miles south of the small town. During the 1880s, the community was boosted by the Indiana Gas Boom, and the community had two gas companies of its own. Eventually, the community had as many as 25 residences. In addition to its post office, the village also had a tannery, blacksmith shops, saw and tile mills and its own physicians. It also had two churches, two general stores and a drug store. The Trenton school was constructed in the 1870s, and its last version closed in 1964.

The Gas Boom gradually ended during the beginning of the 20th century, and many small communities never recovered. Improvements to the automobile and highways, which coincided with the end of the Gas Boom, may have also contributed to the decline of the county's smaller communities as consumers became willing to travel to larger cities.

== Geography ==
Located in the Jackson Township portion of Blackford County, Trenton is situated on Indiana State Road 26. The community is located 60 miles (97 km) south of Fort Wayne and 80 miles (130 km) northeast of Indianapolis. Trenton is part of East Central Indiana and Northern Indiana. Future Northern Indiana, including what became Jackson Township and Trenton, was flattened by two glaciers millions of years ago. These glaciers are also responsible for the rich Blackford County farmland, which includes the land surrounding Trenton.

=== Climate and weather ===
Hartford City, Indiana (approximately 7 miles west of Trenton)

Climate chart (precipitation, max. and min. temperature)
J	F	M	A	M	J	J	A	S	O	N	D
2 33 18	1.9 38 22	2.8 49 31	3.4 62 41	3.8 72 50	4.3 81 60	4.3 84 63	4.1 82 62	2.9 76 54	2.5 65 43	3.4 50 34	2.7 38 23
- █ Average max. and min. temperatures in °F
- █ Precipitation totals in inches
- Source: The Weather Channel
Metric conversion
J	F	M	A	M	J	J	A	S	O	N	D
50 1 −8	49 3 −6	71 9 −1	86 17 5	97 22 10	110 27 16	109 29 17	103 28 17	73 24 12	63 18 6	86 10 1	69 3 −5
- █ Average max. and min. temperatures in °C
- █ Precipitation totals in mm

Trenton has a typical Midwestern humid continental seasonal climate. There are four distinct seasons, with winters being cold with moderate snowfall, while summers can be warm and humid. In recent years, average temperatures in nearby county seat Hartford City have ranged from a low of 18 °F (−8 °C) in January to a high of 84 °F (29 °C) in July, although a record low of −26 °F (−32 °C) was recorded in January 1994 and a record high of 103 °F (39 °C) was recorded in June 1988. Average monthly precipitation ranged from 1.94 inches (49 mm) in February to 4.33 inches (110 mm) in June. The biggest snow storm in recent memory was the Great Blizzard of 1978, which occurred on January 26–27, 1978. A federal state of emergency was declared for Indiana at that time.

=== Nearby cities ===
- Dunkirk (about 7 highway miles southeast)
- Hartford City (about 7 highway miles west)
- Eaton (about 16 highway miles southwest)
- Portland (about 15 highway miles east)
- Upland (about 15 highway miles west)
