= Jackson Township, Blackford County, Indiana =

Jackson Township
- Township
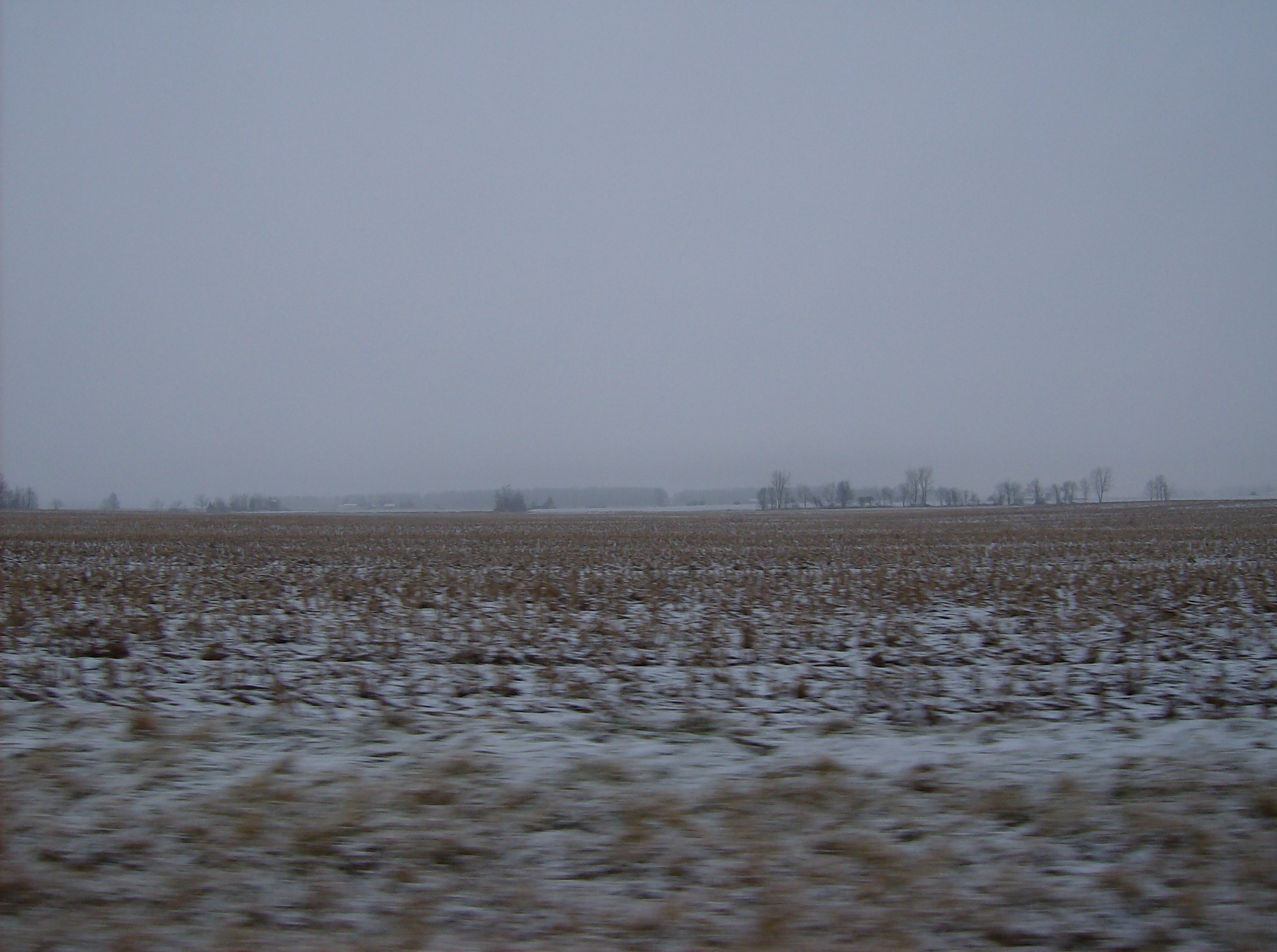
- Snow-covered countryside in Jackson Township

- Location of Jackson Township in Blackford County
- Coordinates: 40°25′50″N 85°16′02″W
- Country: United States
- State: Indiana
- County: Blackford

Government
  - Type: Indiana township

Area
  - Total: 45.67 sq mi (118.3 km^{2})
  - Land: 45.56 sq mi (118.0 km^{2})
  - Water: 0.11 sq mi (0.28 km^{2})
- Elevation: 920 ft (280 m)

Population (2020)
  - Total: 1,233
  - Density: 27.06/sq mi (10.45/km^{2})
- Time zone: UTC-5 (Eastern (EST))
  - Summer (DST): UTC-4 (EDT)
- Area code: 765
- FIPS code: 18-36774
- GNIS feature ID: 453431

Jackson Township is one of four townships in Blackford County, Indiana. As of the 2020 census, its population was 1,233 (down from 1,354 at 2010) and it contained 554 housing units. The township was named after Andrew Jackson, the Brevet Major General of the Battle of New Orleans and the seventh President of the United States.

== Geography ==
According to the 2010 census, the township has a total area of 45.67 square miles (118.3 km^{2}), of which 45.56 square miles (118.0 km^{2}) (or 99.76%) is land and 0.11 square miles (0.28 km^{2}) (or 0.24%) is water. Lake Placid is in this township. Lick Creek runs through the township.

Map of Jackson Township

=== Cities and towns ===
- Dunkirk (southeast edge)

=== Unincorporated towns ===
- Converse (originally called Crumley's Crossing)
- Millgrove
- Trenton (Post Office called Priam)

=== Major highways ===
- SR 26
- SR 167

=== Cemeteries ===
The township contains at least seven cemeteries: Buckles, Goghnauer, Mount Tabor, Reeves, South Trenton, Wayman and West Trenton.
