= Licking Township, Blackford County, Indiana =

Licking Township
- Township
- Location of Licking Township in Blackford County
- Coordinates: 40°26′00″N 85°23′14″W
- Country: United States
- State: Indiana
- County: Blackford

Government
  - Type: Indiana township

Area
  - Total: 41.46 sq mi (107.4 km^{2})
  - Land: 41.18 sq mi (106.7 km^{2})
  - Water: 0.28 sq mi (0.73 km^{2})
- Elevation: 873 ft (266 m)

Population (2020)
  - Total: 7,723
  - Density: 187.5/sq mi (72.41/km^{2})
- FIPS code: 18-43650
- GNIS feature ID: 453568

Licking Township is one of four townships in Blackford County, Indiana. As of the 2020 census, its population was 7,723 (down from 7,899 at 2010) and it contained 3,784 housing units. The township was named after Lick Creek and a salt lick in the area. The first settlers in what became Blackford County arrived in the Lick Creek area in 1831.

== Geography ==
According to the 2010 census, the township has a total area of 41.46 square miles (107.4 km^{2}), of which 41.18 square miles (106.7 km^{2}) (or 99.32%) is land and 0.28 square miles (0.73 km^{2}) (or 0.68%) is water. Cains Lake and Lake Mohee are in this township. Lick Creek flows through the township.

Map of Licking Township

=== Cities and towns ===
- Hartford City
- Shamrock Lakes

=== Unincorporated towns ===
- Hoover Park
- Renner

=== Major highways ===
- SR 3
- SR 26

=== Cemeteries ===
The township contains at least seven cemeteries: Cunningham, Greenlawn, Independent Order of Odd Fellows, Lion, Sprague, Stewart, and Willman (a.k.a. Hartford City Cemetery).
