= Shamrock Lakes, Indiana =

- Town
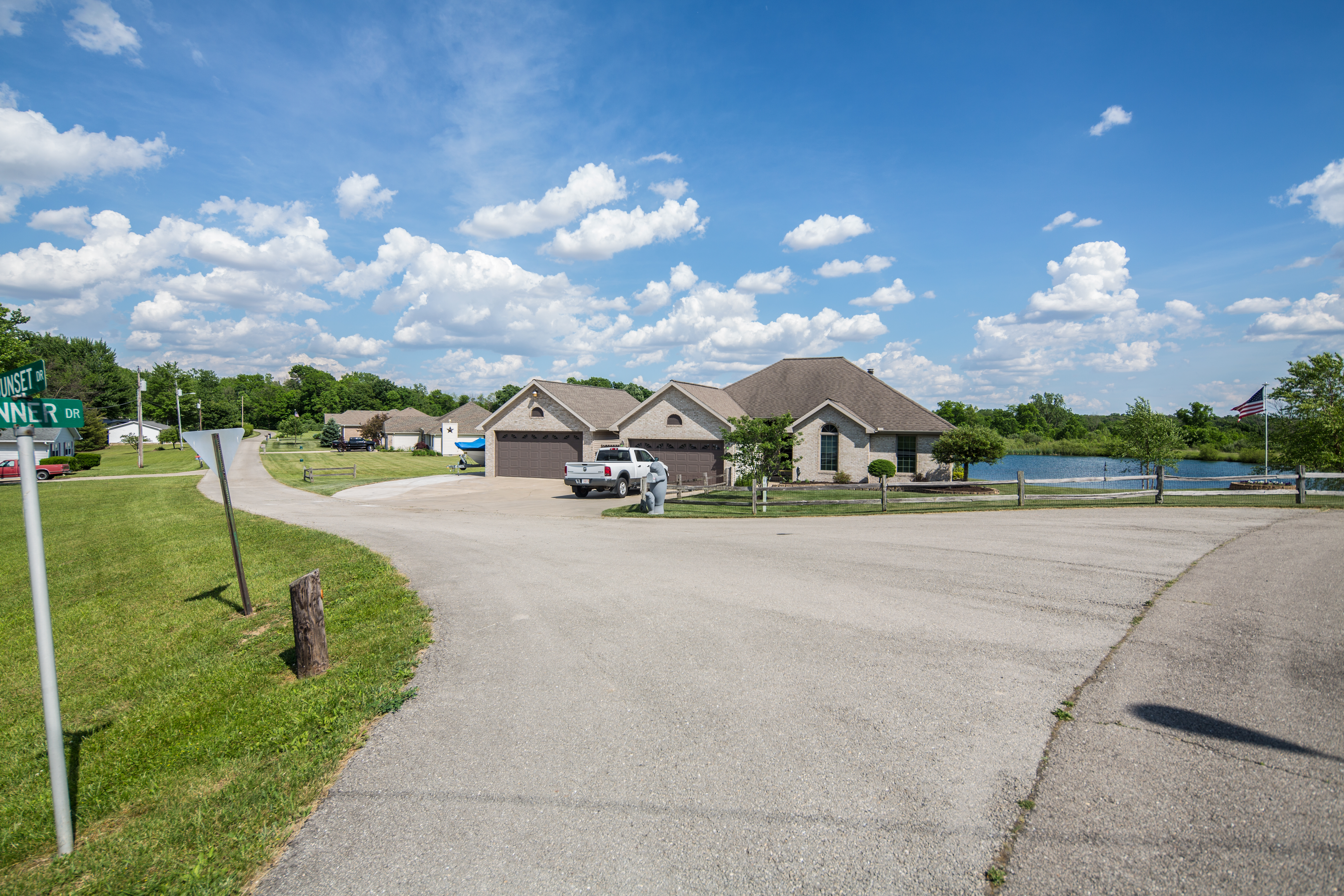
- Nickname: Shamrock Lake Estates
- Location of Shamrock Lakes in Blackford County, Indiana.
- Coordinates: 40°24′42″N 85°25′34″W
- Country: United States
- State: Indiana
- County: Blackford
- Township: Licking
- Incorporated: May 21, 1973

Government
  - Type: Town board

Area
  - Total: 0.32 sq mi (0.83 km^{2})
  - Land: 0.26 sq mi (0.68 km^{2})
  - Water: 0.054 sq mi (0.14 km^{2})
- Elevation: 892 ft (272 m)

Population (2020)
  - Total: 222
  - Estimate (2025): 216 ▼
  - Density: 843.8/sq mi (325.78/km^{2})
- Time zone: UTC-5 (Eastern (EST))
  - Summer (DST): UTC-4 (EDT)
- ZIP code: 47348
- Area code: 765
- FIPS code: 18-68976
- GNIS feature ID: 2397652
- Website: townofshamrocklakes.net

Shamrock Lakes is a town in Licking Township, Blackford County, Indiana, United States. As of the 2020 census, Shamrock Lakes had a population of 222. It was incorporated on May 21, 1973—and was the first community in Indiana to do so in 50 years. The small town consists of a group of six lakes that were created between 1960 and 1965, and the first lake was originally intended to be a water supply for a farmer's cattle. The community was listed on the front page of USA Today as one of only five places in the United States named after Ireland's clover emblem, the shamrock.

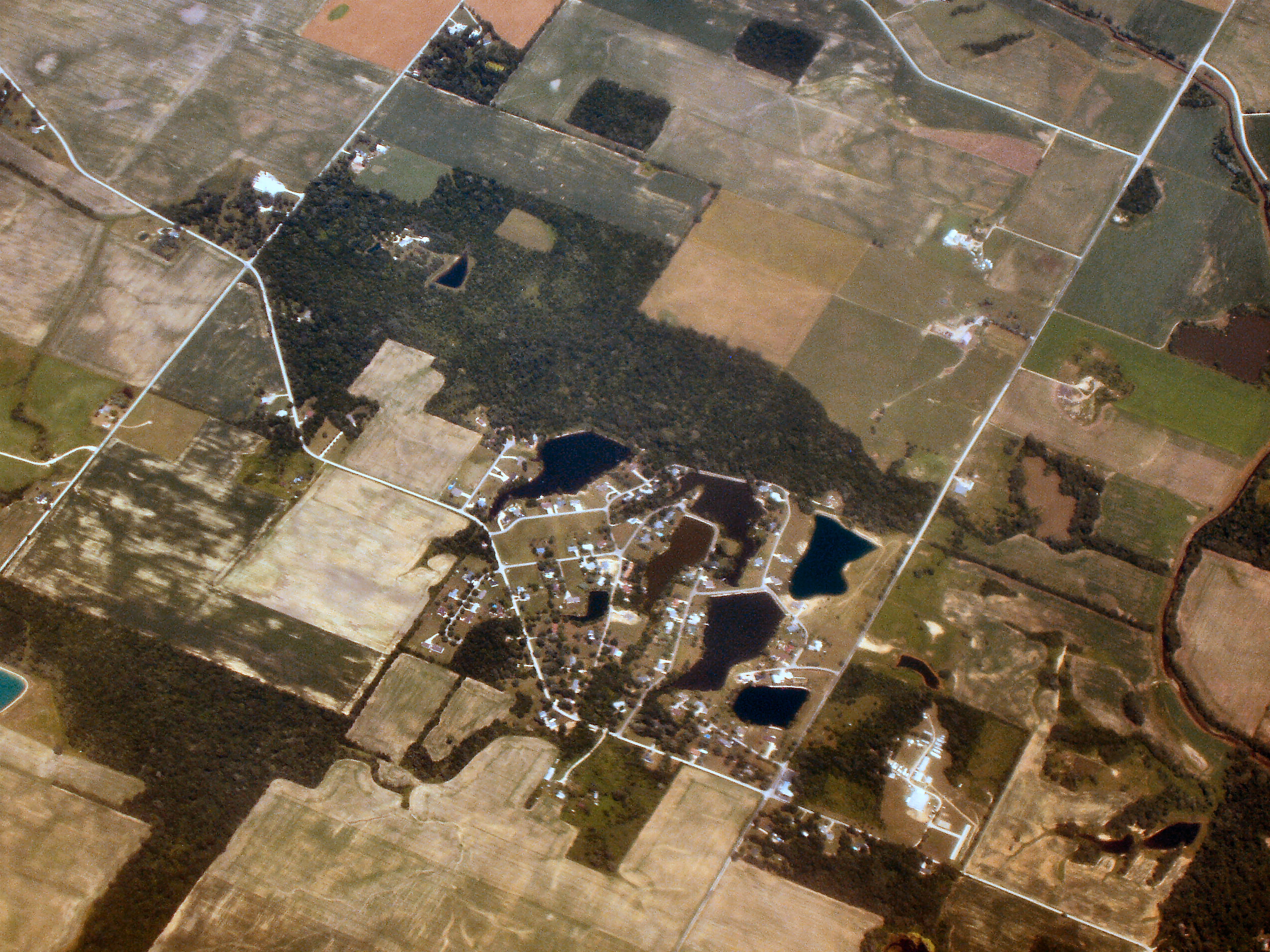
Shamrock Lakes from the air, looking northeast.

== Geography ==
According to the 2010 census, Shamrock Lakes has a total area of 0.316 square miles (0.82 km^{2}), of which 0.26 square miles (0.67 km^{2}) (or 82.28%) is land and 0.056 square miles (0.15 km^{2}) (or 17.72%) is water.

== Demographics ==
Historical population
Census	Pop.	Note	%±
1980	206		—
1990	207		0.5%
2000	168		−18.8%
2010	231		37.5%
2020	222		−3.9%
2025 (est.)	216	▼	−2.7%
U.S. Decennial Census

=== 2010 census ===
As of the census of 2010, there were 231 people, 94 households, and 74 families residing in the town. The population density was 888.5 inhabitants per square mile (343.1/km^{2}). There were 101 housing units at an average density of 388.5 per square mile (150.0/km^{2}). The racial makeup of the town was 98.7% White and 1.3% Asian.

There were 94 households, of which 27.7% had children under the age of 18 living with them, 69.1% were married couples living together, 8.5% had a female householder with no husband present, 1.1% had a male householder with no wife present, and 21.3% were non-families. 19.1% of all households were made up of individuals, and 6.4% had someone living alone who was 65 years of age or older. The average household size was 2.46 and the average family size was 2.78.

The median age in the town was 48.8 years. 20.8% of residents were under the age of 18; 3.9% were between the ages of 18 and 24; 20.8% were from 25 to 44; 39.4% were from 45 to 64; and 15.2% were 65 years of age or older. The gender makeup of the town was 48.5% male and 51.5% female.

=== 2000 census ===
As of the census of 2000, there were 168 people, 66 households, and 57 families residing in the town. The population density was 626.3 inhabitants per square mile (241.8/km^{2}). There were 69 housing units at an average density of 257.2 per square mile (99.3/km^{2}). The racial makeup of the town was 99.40% White and 0.60% Native American.

There were 66 households, out of which 31.8% had children under the age of 18 living with them, 80.3% were married couples living together, 4.5% had a female householder with no husband present, and 13.6% were non-families. 9.1% of all households were made up of individuals, and 3.0% had someone living alone who was 65 years of age or older. The average household size was 2.55 and the average family size was 2.74.

In the town, the population was spread out, with 20.2% under the age of 18, 7.7% from 18 to 24, 18.5% from 25 to 44, 43.5% from 45 to 64, and 10.1% who were 65 years of age or older. The median age was 46 years. For every 100 females, there were 110.0 males. For every 100 females age 18 and over, there were 106.2 males.

The median income for a household in the town was $61,875, and the median income for a family was $65,250. Males had a median income of $46,250 versus $19,219 for females. The per capita income for the town was $21,088. None of the families and 2.6% of the population were living below the poverty line, including no under eighteens and 20.0% of those over 64.
