= Blackford County, Indiana =

County in Indiana, United States

- County
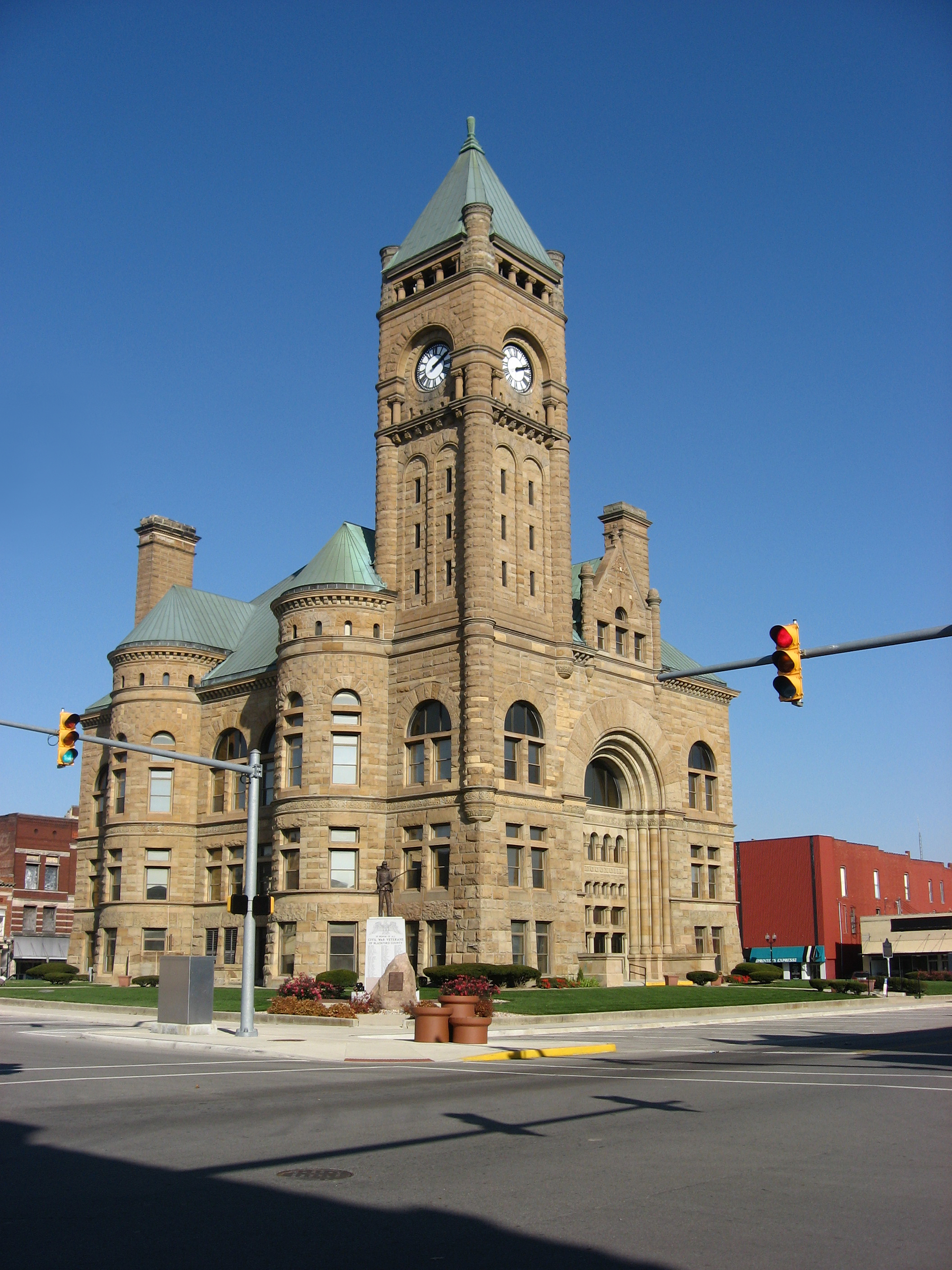
- Blackford County Courthouse in Hartford City

- Logo
- Motto: "Growing Together"
- Location within the U.S. state of Indiana
- Coordinates: 40°28′N 85°19′W
- Country: United States
- State: Indiana
- Founded: April 2, 1838
- Named for: Isaac Blackford
- Seat: Hartford City
- Largest city: Hartford City

Area
  - Total: 165.58 sq mi (428.9 km^{2})
  - Land: 165.08 sq mi (427.6 km^{2})
  - Water: 0.50 sq mi (1.3 km^{2}) 0.30%

Population (2020)
  - Total: 12,112
  - Estimate (2025): 11,730 ▼
  - Density: 77.3/sq mi (29.86/km^{2})
- Time zone: UTC−5 (Eastern)
  - Summer (DST): UTC−4 (EDT)
- Congressional districts: 3rd, 5th
- Website: www.blackfordcounty.com
- Indiana county number 5 FIPS Code 009

Blackford County is located in the east central portion of the U.S. state of Indiana. The county is named for Judge Isaac Blackford, who was the first speaker of the Indiana General Assembly and a long-time chief justice of the Indiana Supreme Court. Created in 1838, Blackford County is divided into four townships, and its county seat is Hartford City. Two incorporated cities and one incorporated town are located within the county. The county is also the site of numerous unincorporated communities and ghost towns. Occupying only 165.58 square miles (428.9 km^{2}), Blackford County is the fourth smallest county in Indiana. As of the 2020 census, the county's population was 12,112. Based on population, the county is the 8th smallest county of the 92 in Indiana. Although no interstate highways are located in Blackford County, three Indiana state roads cross the county, and an additional state road is located along the county's southeast border. The county has two railroad lines. A north–south route crosses the county, and intersects with a second railroad line that connects Hartford City with communities to the west.

Before the arrival of European-American settlers during the 1830s, the northeastern portion of the future Blackford County was briefly the site of an Indian reservation for Chief Francois Godfroy of the Miami tribe. The first European-American pioneers were typically farmers who settled on arable land near rivers. Originally, the county was mostly swampland, but more land became available for farming as the marshes were cleared and drained. Over the next 30 years, small communities developed throughout the county. When the county's rail lines were constructed in the 1860s and 1870s, additional communities evolved around railroad stops.

Beginning in the late 1880s, the discovery of natural gas and crude oil in the county (and surrounding region) caused the area to undergo an economic boom period known as the Indiana Gas Boom. Manufacturers relocated to the area to take advantage of the low-cost energy and railroad facilities. The boom period lasted about 15 years, and is reflected in Blackford County's population, which peaked in 1900 at 17,213. The construction associated with the additional prosperity of the boom period caused a significant upgrade in the county's appearance, as wooden buildings were replaced with masonry structures. Much of the infrastructure built during that time remains today—including Montpelier's historic Carnegie Library and many of Hartford City's buildings in the Courthouse Square Historic District.

Agriculture continues to be important to the county, and became even more important after the loss of several large manufacturers during the 20th century. (Note: The American Window Glass plant closed near the beginning of the Great Depression as fewer factories were needed because of a new window making process using machines that was much more productive than the more labor-intensive process used earlier. Sneath Glass Company closed during the 1950s after plastics replaced many of the company's products. The Overhead Door Company moved its headquarters to a larger city (Dallas, Texas) in 1964, and the Hartford City plant was closed in 2000 after cutbacks during the 1980s.) As of 2010, 72 percent of Blackford County is covered by either corn or soybean fields; additional crops, such as wheat and hay, are also grown. (Note: In 2010, 34 thousand acres of corn, and 42.4 thousand acres of soybeans, were planted in Blackford County. Total acreage for those two crops is 76,400. Blackford County's total area is 165.4 square miles or 105,856 acres, so over 72 percent of the county is devoted to those two crops.)

== History ==
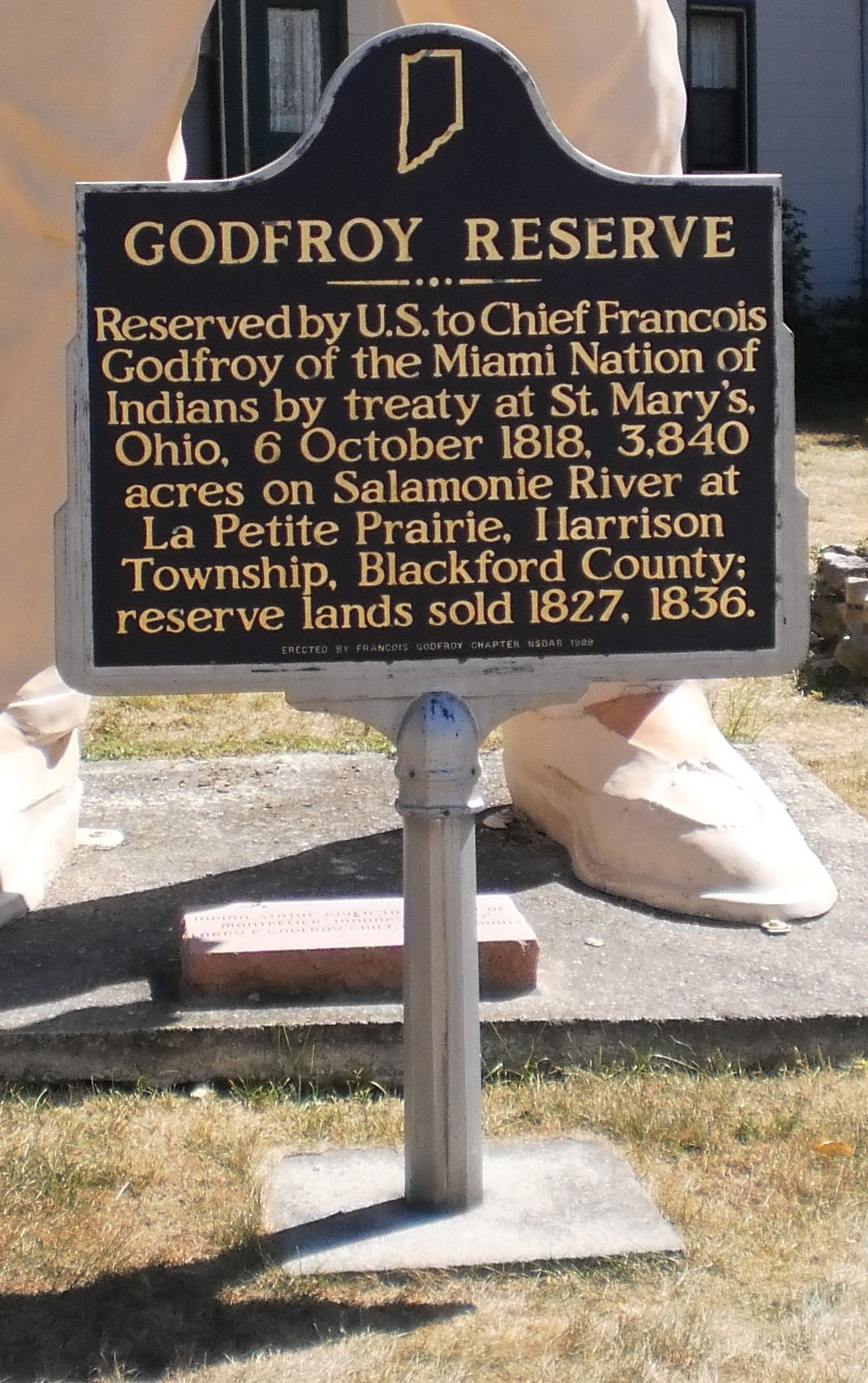
Historic Marker in Montpelier, Indiana

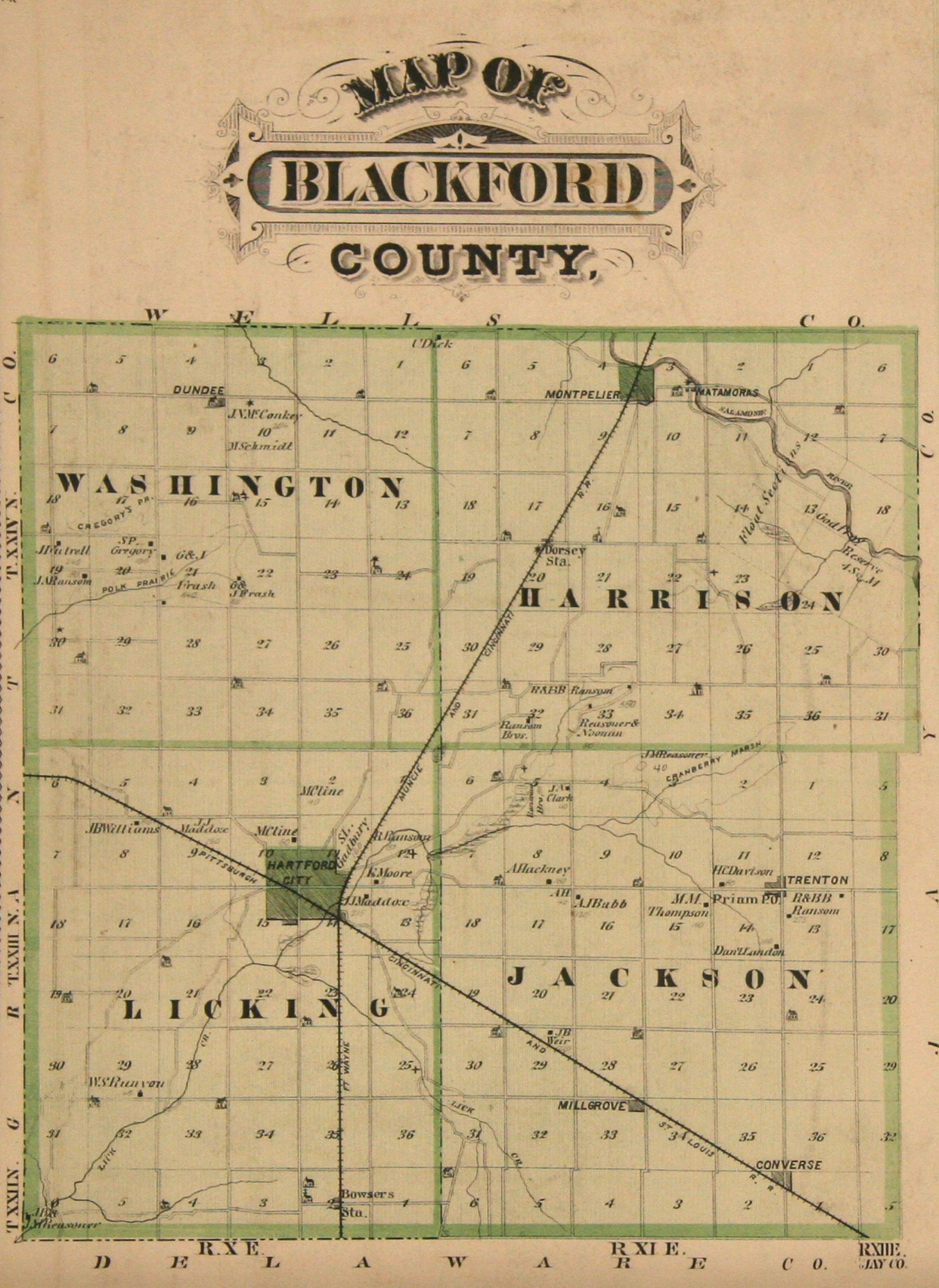
1876 map of Blackford County

Following thousands of years of varying cultures of indigenous peoples, the historic Miami and Delaware Indians (a.k.a. Lenape) are the first-recorded permanent settlers in the Blackford County area, living on the Godfroy Reserve after an 1818 treaty. The site is located in Blackford County's Harrison Township, east of Montpelier. Although the Godfroy Reserve was allotted to Miami Native Chief Francois (a.k.a. Francis) Godfroy, Delaware Indians were also allowed to stay there. The Miami tribe was the most powerful group of Natives in the region, and Francois Godfroy (who was half French) was one of their chiefs. By 1839, Godfroy had sold the reserve, and the Natives had migrated west. Benjamin Reasoner was the first European–American to enter future Blackford County, and its first land owner. He entered the area on July 9, 1831. Reasoner and his sons built the county's first mill, on their farm.

The land that would become Blackford County was originally the western part of Jay County. A January 30, 1836, act of the Indiana General Assembly created Jay County, effective March 1, 1836. In December 1836, a motion was made in the Indiana House of Representatives to review dividing Jay County, but that resolution was not adopted. Two Blackford County communities, Matamoras and Montpelier, originally existed as part of Jay County. They lie along the Salamonie River in what became the northeast portion of Blackford County. John Blount founded Matamoras, arriving in 1833. (Note: "Blount" may have also been spelled "Blunt". In Bureau of Land Management records for the area that would become Blackford County, "John Blunt" is listed as a land purchaser in 1835. (Benjamin Reasoner is listed as the first land purchaser.)) This village is Blackford County's oldest community, and is the site of the county's largest water mill. The mill, constructed around 1843, was considered one of the finest in the state. Blackford County's other former Jay County community is Montpelier, west of Matamoras on the Salamonie River. Led by Abel Baldwin, the community was started in 1836 by groups of migrant settlers from Vermont. They named the settlement after the capital of their previous home state. Blackford County's Montpelier was platted in 1837 (before Matamoras), and is the county's oldest platted community.

Several sources list the creation year for Blackford County as 1837. (Note: At least three sources incorrectly say Blackford County began in 1837: Biographical and historical record of Jay and Blackford Counties..., Montgomery and Jay, and Shinn.) However, the law was not finalized until 1838. Indiana bill of the House No. 152 was originally for the creation of a county named Windsor. The name "Windsor" was replaced with the name "Blackford" by the House of Representatives in January 1838. An "act for the formation of the county of Blackford" was approved on February 15, 1838. This act intended that the county would be "open for business" on the first Monday in April 1838, which was April 2. However, the county was not organized. Finally, on January 29, 1839, the original February 15 act was amended, stating that Blackford County shall "enjoy the rights and privileges" of an independent county. The act also appointed commissioners, and corrected a misprint that defined the southeast corner of the new county. (Note: Multiple dates are designated as the time Blackford County was “created” or “founded”. February 15, 1838, is the date Blackford County was created by legislation, and this date is used by at least one source as the county’s creation date. The original legislation expected the county to be organized on April 2, 1838. An additional act clarified the county’s status on January 29, 1839, and the county was finally organized later that year.)

Over the next two years, a political struggle continued to determine the location of the county seat. The tiny community of Hartford was repeatedly selected by the commissioners, but those decisions were challenged by individuals favoring Montpelier. While Licking Township (where Hartford lay) was the most populous township in the county, Montpelier was the county's oldest platted community. After a third and fourth act of the Indiana General Assembly, Hartford was finalized as the location of the county seat—and construction of a courthouse began. When it was noted that another Indiana community was also named Hartford, Blackford County's Hartford was renamed Hartford City.

During the next 25 years, the county grew slowly. Plans were made for roads and railroads, and swampland was drained. The first railroad line was authorized in 1849. The plan was for the Fort Wayne & Southern Railroad Company to connect the Indiana cities of Fort Wayne and Muncie—running north–south through the Blackford County communities of Montpelier and Hartford City. Although construction began in the 1850s, it was not completed (by connecting Fort Wayne to Muncie) until 1870, and this delay caused it to be the second railroad to operate in Blackford County. By the time the railroad began operations, it was named Fort Wayne, Cincinnati & Louisville Railroad. The Lake Erie and Western Railroad acquired this railroad in 1890. (Note: The railroad changed ownership and names more than once, and was also known as the Lake Erie and Western Railroad, the Nickel Plate Road, and the Norfolk and Western Railway. The line is currently owned by the Norfolk Southern Railway.)

The first railroad to operate in Blackford County crossed somewhat east–west through the county's southern half. The railroad was named Union and Logansport Railroad Company by the time it entered Blackford County. This line was proposed in 1862, and completed to Hartford City in 1867—running through the Blackford County communities of Dunkirk, Crumley's Crossing, and Hartford City. The small community of Crumley's Crossing was renamed Converse, and two other communities (Millgrove and Renner) became established on this line. The railroad was eventually named Pittsburgh, Cincinnati and St. Louis Railroad. Other names for the railroad since that time include the Panhandle division of the Pennsylvania Railroad, Penn Central Transportation Company, Conrail, and Norfolk Southern Railway. A portion of this line is now abandoned, and the track has been removed between Converse and Hartford City, south of State Road 26.

=== Gas boom ===
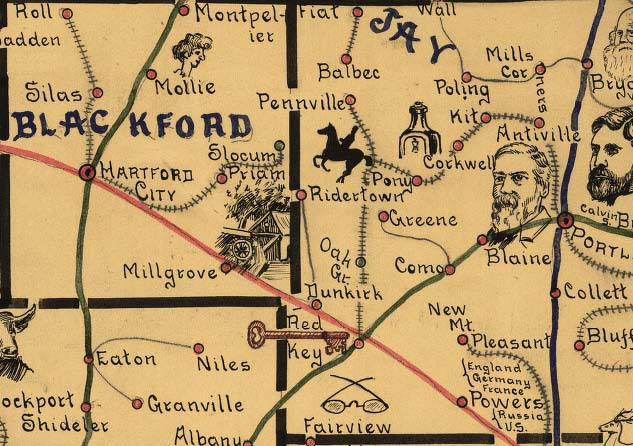
Blackford County in 1887 with western portion of Jay County (east of Blackford) and northeast corner of Delaware County (south of Blackford).

In 1886, natural gas was discovered in two counties adjacent to Blackford County. The discoveries were in the small community of Eaton (south of Hartford City along railroad line) in Delaware County, and in the city of Portland in Jay County (east of Hartford City and Millgrove). The Hartford City Gas & Oil Company was formed in early 1887, and successfully drilled a natural gas well later in the year. The Montpelier Gas & Oil Mining company was organized in 1887. While natural gas was found throughout Blackford County, crude oil was found mostly in the county's Harrison Township (between Montpelier and Mollie). Blackford County's first successful oil well, located south of Montpelier, began producing in 1890. Montpelier was thought to be "the very heart of the greatest natural gas and oil field in the world". Oil was also found in parts of Washington Township, including a well that was thought to be "the most phenomenal well ever drilled in America". By 1896, Blackford County had 18 natural gas companies, headquartered in all four of the county's townships, including the communities of Hartford City, Montpelier, Roll, Dunkirk, Trenton (Priam Post Office), and Millgrove.

In June 1880, only 171 people held manufacturing jobs in Blackford County. The Indiana Gas Boom transformed the region, as manufacturers moved to the area to utilize the natural gas and railroad system. During 1901, Indiana state inspectors visited 21 manufacturing facilities in Blackford County, and these companies employed 1,346 people (compare to 171 two decades earlier). Since these inspections were in Hartford City and Montpelier only, additional manufacturing employees from the county's small communities (such as Millgrove's glass factory) could be added to the count of 1,346. The county's two largest employers were glass factories: American Window Glass plant number 3 and Sneath Glass Company. Hartford City's resources (low–cost energy, two railroads, and skilled workforce) were especially favored by glass factories, and a 1904 directory lists 10 of them. (Note: Hartford City's workforce became an attraction for glass companies. The city had a community of skilled glass workers from Belgium.) In addition to an economic transformation, another byproduct of the gas boom was an upgrade of Blackford County's appearance. Many of the county's landmark buildings were constructed during the gas boom, including the current courthouse and surrounding buildings in Hartford City's Courthouse Square Historic District. The city's water supply system was also built during that period. Additional buildings include the Carnegie Library, and the historic Presbyterian Church. Many of Montpelier's Downtown Historic District structures were built during the gas boom. Montpelier's historic Baptist Church and Montpelier's Carnegie Library were constructed in the early 1900s – near the end of the gas boom.

=== Post-gas boom ===
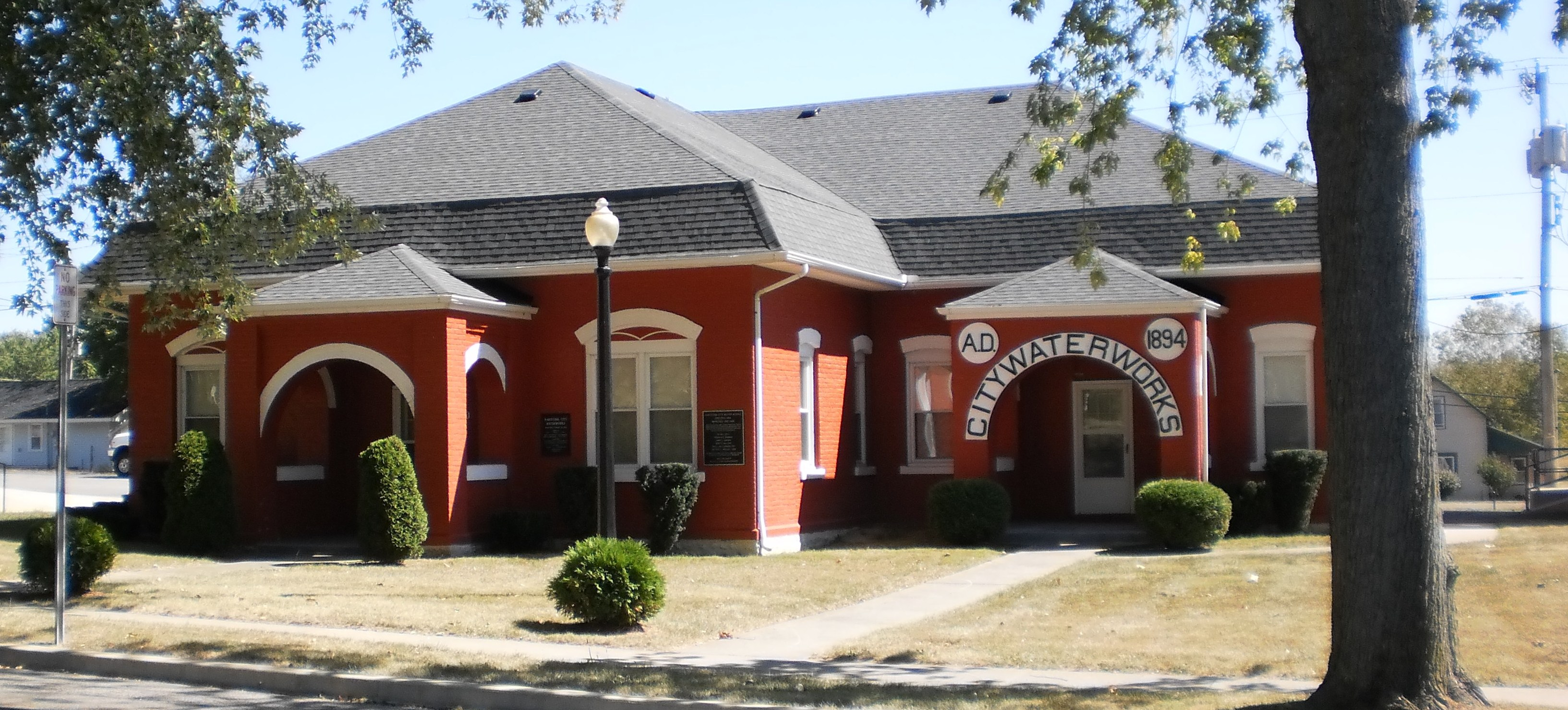
Hartford City's waterworks, built in 1894

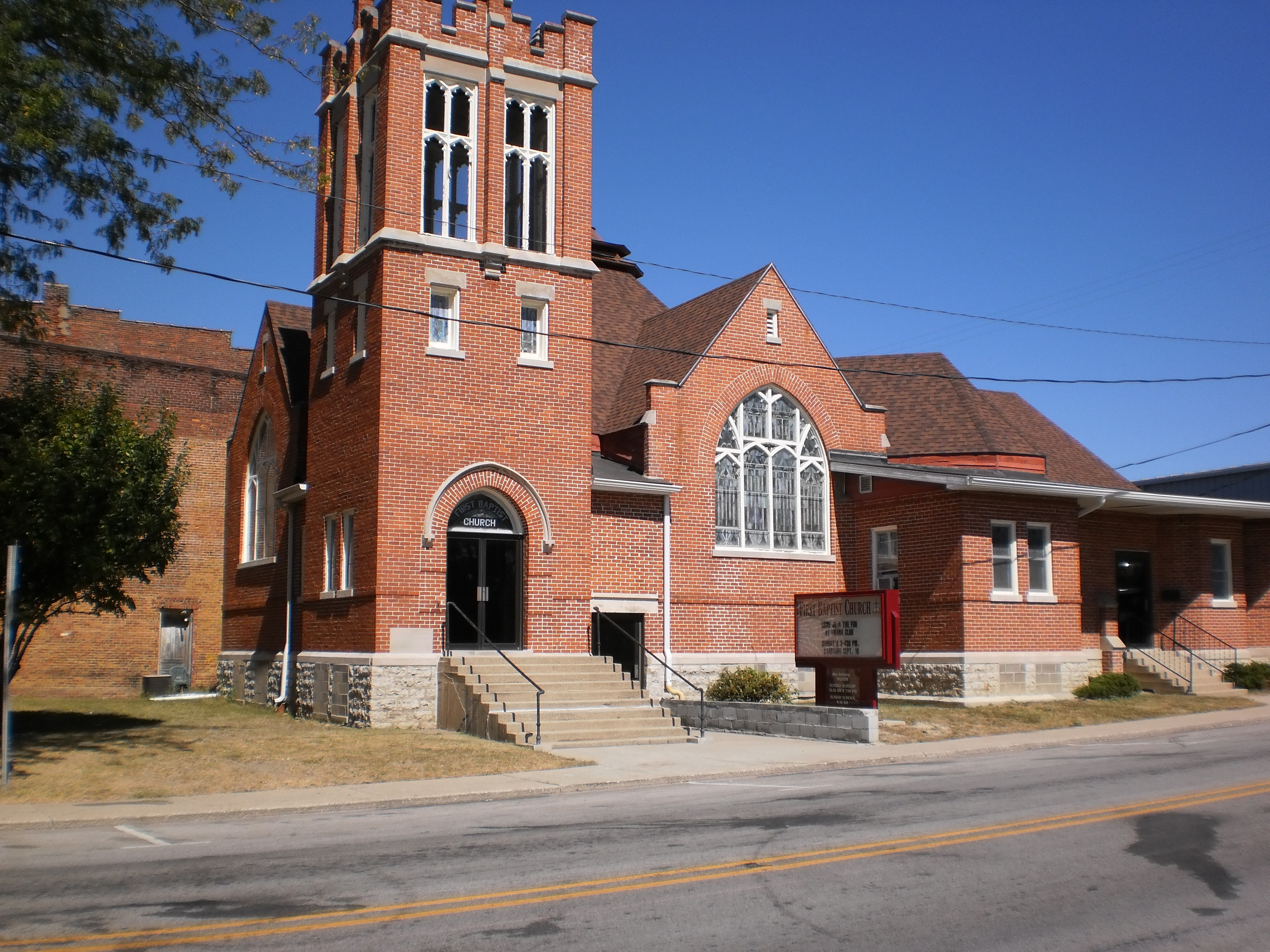
Montpelier's historic Baptist Church, built during Montpelier's Oil Boom

The Indiana Gas Boom ended during the first decade of the 20th century, reducing the county's economy. Gas and oil workers left, some manufacturers moved, and service industries were forced to cut back operations. Adding to the county's problems, machines made the labor–intensive method originally used for producing window glass obsolete, causing many of the county's skilled glass workers at the large American Window Glass plant to lose their jobs. By 1932, the window glass plant of the county's former largest employer was closed. (Note: A second source says the American Window Glass plant closed in 1929 instead of 1932.) According to the United States Census, Blackford County's population peaked at 17,123 in 1900, and it still has not returned to that zenith over 100 years later.

The end of the gas boom was especially difficult for the smaller communities in the county, since the loss of a single business has more of an impact on small communities. In the case of Millgrove, the community's major manufacturer (a glass factory) closed. For other communities, such as Mollie, the loss of the gas and oil workers meant that the local post office was a "waste of time", and consumer demand at the general store was significantly diminished.

Improvements to the automobile and highways, which coincided with the end of the gas boom, also contributed to the decline of the county's smaller communities. The automobile changed "business and shopping patterns at the expense of the small-town merchant". Small–town residents began to drive to larger communities to purchase goods, because of the wider selection. The improved quality of automobiles and roads competed with passenger service on the railroads (and interurban lines), causing a decline in passenger traffic on the rails. Small towns associated with railroad stations suffered from the loss in traffic. In Blackford County, passenger service on the Lake Erie and Western Railroad line (owned by the Nickel Plate Road by that time) was discontinued in 1931, and the last interurban train ran on January 18, 1941.

Although many workers left the area after the gas and oil bust, Montpelier's population eventually stabilized—and Hartford City's grew. Some manufacturers remained because of a lack of better alternatives. Hartford City's Sneath Glass Company, a major employer, continued operations until the 1950s. Hartford City leaders attracted businesses such as Overhead Door (1923) and 3M (1955) to replace the former companies. Overhead Door was a major employer in Hartford City for over 60 years. In the 1960s, Overhead Door moved its headquarters from Hartford City to Dallas, Texas, although its Hartford City manufacturing plant continued until the 1980s as a major manufacturer, when it began reducing its local presence. It ceased the Indiana operation in 2000. (Note: Grant's Overhead Door article in volume 70 of the International Directory of Company Histories has been reproduced on a web page.) The county lost another 200 jobs in 2011 when Hartford City's Key Plastics plant closed.

Agriculture continues to be an important factor in the county's economy. Over 70 percent of Blackford County's land is occupied by soybean or corn fields. Additional crops and livestock are also raised. Good returns in agriculture are not always reflected in the economy of nearby towns, as industrial agriculture has reduced the number of workers it needs, and family farms have declined. Many small towns in the "Corn Belt", such as the communities in Blackford County, continue to decline in size and affluence.

== Geography ==
According to the 2010 census, Blackford County has a total area of 165.58 square miles (428.9 km^{2}), of which 165.08 square miles (427.6 km^{2}) (or 99.70%) is land and 0.50 square miles (1.3 km^{2}) (or 0.30%) is water, making it the fourth smallest county in the state. The county is located in East Central Indiana, about 55 miles (89 km) south of Fort Wayne, Indiana, and about 78 miles (126 km) northeast of Indianapolis. (Note: Mileages from Blackford County to Fort Wayne and Indianapolis are based on highway miles using county seat Hartford City for Blackford County.)

=== Adjacent counties ===
- Wells County (north)
- Jay County (east)
- Delaware County (south)
- Grant County (west)

The terrain of Blackford County shows the influence of glacial passage in the distant past. These glaciers were responsible for the rich farmland that became available after the county was cleared and drained. During the early 20th century, the Renner Stock Farm, in Licking Township, was known statewide for its quality cattle, hogs, and horses. (Note: A portion of Shinn's description of the Renner Stock Farm has been reproduced on a web page (scroll down).)

=== Waterways ===
The county has some small streams, and several man-made lakes. The Salamonie River, flowing out of Jay County (Indiana) from the east, crosses the northeast corner of Blackford County. Big and Little Lick Creek flow westward in Licking and Jackson townships in the southern half of the county. Early settlers were attracted to Lick Creek, and then the Salamonie River, because the nearby land had suitable drainage for farming. The county's lakes include Lake Blue Water in Harrison Township; Cain's Lake, Shamrock Lakes and Lake Mohee in Licking Township; and Lake Placid in Jackson Township. Lake Blue Water is a spring-fed former stone quarry located one mile (1.6 km) east of Montpelier. The Shamrock Lakes (a group of six lakes) were created between 1960 and 1965, and the first lake was originally intended to be a water supply for a farmer's cattle.

=== Townships ===
- Harrison
- Jackson Township (thought to be named after President Andrew Jackson; created by County Commission September 22, 1839.
- Licking
- Washington Township (named after President George Washington; created by County Commission June 29, 1839.

=== Communities ===
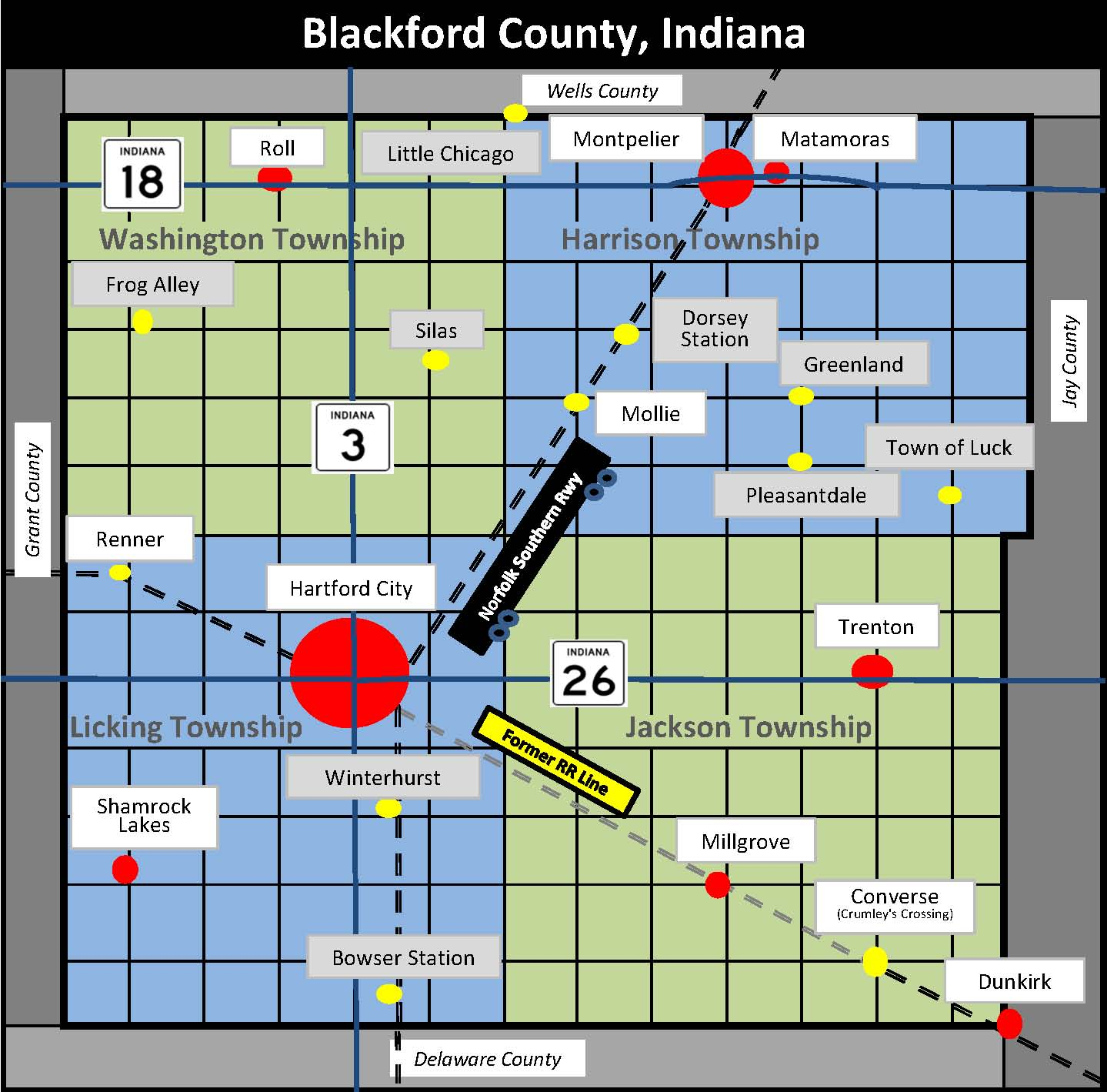
Image map of Blackford County and communities that either existed (yellow dot) or still exist (red dot). Community names with white backgrounds have links.

=== Cities ===
- Hartford City (county seat)
- Montpelier
- Dunkirk (mostly located in adjacent Jay County)

=== Towns ===
- Shamrock Lakes (incorporated May 21, 1973)

=== Unincorporated communities ===
- Converse (formerly named Crumley's Crossing)
- Matamoras
- Millgrove
- Roll (formerly named Dundee)
- Trenton (former post office named Priam)

These communities are sometimes listed as ghost towns, most businesses in these communities have closed. (Note: All five of Blackford County’s unincorporated communities are shown in UniversalMAP’s Northern Indiana road map (2009), and Indiana's digital state transportation map for 2009–2010.) However, residences are still maintained in these communities, and they are listed as populated places by the U.S. Geological Survey. Millgrove, Roll, and Trenton all had post offices during the 19th or 20th century.

==== Extinct settlements ====
Blackford County has over 10 communities that do not exist anymore. In some cases, a church, farm or single residence remains at the extinct community's location. Among these former communities, Bowser Station, Dorsey Station, Mollie, Silas, and Slocum all had post offices during the 19th century. Mollie's post office lasted until 1907.

- Bowser Station—This community was a railroad stop in southern Licking Township, and had a post office during the 1870s. (Note: An 1876 Blackford County map in the David Rumsey Map Collection shows both Dorsey Station and Bowser Station.)
- Dorsey Station—This Harrison Township community was a railroad stop, and had a post office during the 1870s.
- Frog Alley—This Washington Township community had a church and school. "Frog Alley" arose because of the swampy condition of the area. The school, which began in 1863, lasted until 1923.
- Greenland—Located in Harrison Township at 400 North and 600 East.
- Little Chicago—Located in northwest corner of Harrison Township, and in Wells County.
- Mollie—This community thrived in the 1890s as a railroad stop with a grain elevator, post office, and general store. The Harrison Township oil fields were located nearby.
- Pleasantdale—Located in Harrison Township, at 300 North and 600 East.
- Renner (Licking Township) - a railroad stop at the Renner Stock Farm. Housing for the farm's employees was also located there. It thrived from the 1890s until the 1920s. Renner is still listed as a populated place by the U.S. Geological Survey, but its "population" is a farm.
- Silas— (Washington Township) - the land was purchased in 1848, and the owner established a church and school. By 1880, a general store was established at that location, and its owner was community namesake Silas Rayl. During the first decade of the 20th century, the Silas general store closed, contributing to the demise of the community.
- Slocum (southeastern Harrison Township, exact location not known) - had a post office 1886–1902.
- Luck (Harrison Township at 250 North and 800 East)
- Winterhurst (Licking Township, at 200 South and 0.5 miles (0.80 km) East)

== Demographics ==
=== Racial and ethnic composition ===
Blackford County, Indiana – Racial and ethnic composition Note: the US Census treats Hispanic/Latino as an ethnic category. This table excludes Latinos from the racial categories and assigns them to a separate category. Hispanics/Latinos may be of any race.
Race / Ethnicity (NH = Non-Hispanic)	Pop 1980	Pop 1990	Pop 2000	Pop 2010	Pop 2020	% 1980	% 1990	% 2000	% 2010	% 2020
White alone (NH)	15,463	13,911	13,773	12,403	11,278	99.31%	98.89%	98.04%	97.16%	93.11%
Black or African American alone (NH)	4	6	16	48	54	0.03%	0.04%	0.11%	0.38%	0.45%
Native American or Alaska Native alone (NH)	21	43	41	22	38	0.13%	0.31%	0.29%	0.17%	0.31%
Asian alone (NH)	6	16	22	19	24	0.04%	0.11%	0.16%	0.15%	0.20%
Native Hawaiian or Pacific Islander alone (NH)	x	x	0	4	0	x	x	0.00%	0.03%	0.00%
Other race alone (NH)	2	1	5	9	30	0.01%	0.01%	0.04%	0.07%	0.25%
Mixed race or Multiracial (NH)	x	x	108	144	436	x	x	0.77%	1.13%	3.60%
Hispanic or Latino (any race)	74	90	83	117	252	0.48%	0.64%	0.59%	0.92%	2.08%
Total	15,570	14,067	14,048	12,766	12,112	100.00%	100.00%	100.00%	100.00%	100.00%

=== 2020 census ===
Historical population
Census	Pop.	Note	%±
1840	1,226		—
1850	2,860		133.3%
1860	4,122		44.1%
1870	6,272		52.2%
1880	8,020		27.9%
1890	10,461		30.4%
1900	17,213		64.5%
1910	15,820		−8.1%
1920	14,084		−11.0%
1930	13,617		−3.3%
1940	13,783		1.2%
1950	14,026		1.8%
1960	14,792		5.5%
1970	15,888		7.4%
1980	15,570		−2.0%
1990	14,067		−9.7%
2000	14,048		−0.1%
2010	12,766		−9.1%
2020	12,112		−5.1%
2025 (est.)	11,730	▼	−3.2%
U.S. Decennial Census; 1790-1960 1900-1990; 1990-2000 2010-2013

As of the 2020 census, the county had a population of 12,112. The median age was 44.9 years. 21.3% of residents were under the age of 18 and 21.7% of residents were 65 years of age or older. For every 100 females there were 98.4 males, and for every 100 females age 18 and over there were 96.3 males age 18 and over.

The racial makeup of the county was 94.0% White, 0.5% Black or African American, 0.3% American Indian and Alaska Native, 0.2% Asian, <0.1% Native Hawaiian and Pacific Islander, 0.8% from some other race, and 4.2% from two or more races. Hispanic or Latino residents of any race comprised 2.1% of the population.

50.7% of residents lived in urban areas, while 49.3% lived in rural areas.

There were 5,179 households in the county, of which 26.8% had children under the age of 18 living in them. Of all households, 46.5% were married-couple households, 20.1% were households with a male householder and no spouse or partner present, and 26.0% were households with a female householder and no spouse or partner present. About 31.5% of all households were made up of individuals and 15.3% had someone living alone who was 65 years of age or older.

There were 5,857 housing units, of which 11.6% were vacant. Among occupied housing units, 74.4% were owner-occupied and 25.6% were renter-occupied. The homeowner vacancy rate was 2.4% and the rental vacancy rate was 10.9%.

=== 2010 census ===
As of the 2010 United States census, Blackford County's population density was 77.3 inhabitants per square mile (29.8/km^{2}), well below the average for Indiana, which was 180.8 inhabitants per square mile (69.8/km^{2}). Blackford County had 12,766 people, 5,236 households, and 3,567 families residing within its borders. The racial makeup of the county was 97.7 percent white, 0.4 percent black or African American, 0.2 percent Native American, 0.1 percent Asian, 0.3 percent from other races, and 1.3 percent from two or more races. Those of Hispanic or Latino origin made up 0.9 percent of the population.

The average household size was 2.41, and the average family size was 2.88. Families accounted for 68.1 percent of the county's 5,236 households, and 75.5 percent of these families included a husband and wife living together. Children under the age of 18 were living in 38.9 percent of the family households. Non-family households accounted for 31.9 percent of total households, and 86.8 percent of them were occupied by someone living alone. People 65 years and older, living alone, accounted for 40.1 percent of non-family households—or 12.8 percent of all types of households.

In terms of age distribution, 22.8 percent of the population were under the age of 18, and 21.6 percent were 62 years of age or older. The median age was 42.4 years. For every 100 females, there were 97.2 males. For every 100 females age 18 and over, there were 93.7 males.

=== 2000 census ===
As of the 2000 United States census, the median income for a household in the county was $34,760, and the median income for a family was $41,758. Males had a median income of $30,172 versus $21,386 for females. The per capita income for the county was $16,543. About 6.0 percent of families and 8.7 percent of the population were below the poverty line, including 12.3 percent of those under age 18 and 8.6 percent of those age 65 or over. In terms of ancestry, 16.7 percent were German, 15.5 percent were American, 9.3 percent were Irish and 7.8 percent were English.

== Government ==
United States presidential election results for Blackford County, Indiana
Year	Republican		Democratic		Third party(ies)	
Year	No.	%	No.	%	No.	%
1888	1,141	46.57%	1,232	50.29%	77	3.14%
1892	1,203	40.99%	1,340	45.66%	392	13.36%
1896	2,154	47.86%	2,272	50.48%	75	1.67%
1900	2,121	47.25%	2,191	48.81%	177	3.94%
1904	2,521	51.39%	2,058	41.95%	327	6.67%
1908	1,835	43.10%	2,214	52.00%	209	4.91%
1912	399	11.04%	1,651	45.67%	1,565	43.29%
1916	1,595	43.04%	1,867	50.38%	244	6.58%
1920	3,145	51.79%	2,555	42.07%	373	6.14%
1924	3,553	51.10%	3,094	44.50%	306	4.40%
1928	3,882	59.35%	2,576	39.38%	83	1.27%
1932	2,890	40.53%	4,088	57.34%	152	2.13%
1936	2,845	39.82%	4,217	59.02%	83	1.16%
1940	3,352	44.52%	4,095	54.38%	83	1.10%
1944	3,079	47.82%	3,207	49.81%	153	2.38%
1948	2,840	42.76%	3,611	54.37%	190	2.86%
1952	3,759	53.20%	3,144	44.49%	163	2.31%
1956	3,855	54.52%	3,152	44.58%	64	0.91%
1960	3,738	53.33%	3,228	46.06%	43	0.61%
1964	2,552	37.37%	4,210	61.65%	67	0.98%
1968	3,052	46.92%	2,898	44.56%	554	8.52%
1972	3,876	62.33%	2,311	37.16%	32	0.51%
1976	2,886	47.16%	3,174	51.86%	60	0.98%
1980	3,168	53.14%	2,431	40.77%	363	6.09%
1984	3,787	60.79%	2,395	38.44%	48	0.77%
1988	3,336	59.49%	2,253	40.17%	19	0.34%
1992	2,347	40.62%	2,088	36.14%	1,343	23.24%
1996	2,070	40.35%	2,335	45.52%	725	14.13%
2000	2,699	55.16%	2,103	42.98%	91	1.86%
2004	3,447	64.07%	1,903	35.37%	30	0.56%
2008	2,690	49.36%	2,677	49.12%	83	1.52%
2012	2,711	56.95%	1,927	40.48%	122	2.56%
2016	3,350	68.63%	1,243	25.47%	288	5.90%
2020	3,841	71.69%	1,376	25.68%	141	2.63%
2024	3,811	74.20%	1,227	23.89%	98	1.91%

The county government is a constitutional body granted specific powers by the Constitution of Indiana and the Indiana Code. The county council is the legislative branch of the county government and controls all spending and revenue collection. Representatives are elected from county districts. The council members serve four-year terms and are responsible for setting salaries, the annual budget and special spending. The council also has limited authority to impose local taxes, in the form of an income and property tax that is subject to state level approval, excise taxes and service taxes. In 2010, the county budgeted approximately $3.95 million for the district's schools and $3.18 million for other county operations and services, for a total annual budget of approximately $7.1 million.

The executive body of the county is a board of commissioners. They are elected county-wide, in staggered four–year terms. One commissioner serves as president. The commissioners are charged with executing the acts legislated by the council, collecting revenue and managing day-to-day functions of the county government.

The county maintains a small claims court that can handle some civil cases. The judge on the court is elected to a term of four years and must be a member of the Indiana Bar Association. The judge is assisted by a constable who is elected to a four-year term. In some cases, court decisions can be appealed to the state level circuit court.

The county has several other elected offices, including sheriff, coroner, auditor, treasurer, recorder, surveyor and circuit court clerk. Each serves a four–year term and oversees a different part of county government. Members elected to county government positions are required to declare party affiliations and be residents of the county.

Each township has a trustee who administers rural fire protection and ambulance service, provides poor relief and manages cemetery care, among other duties. The trustee is assisted in these duties by a three-member township board. The trustees and board members are elected to four-year terms.

== Climate and weather ==
Hartford City, Indiana

Climate chart (precipitation, max. and min. temperature)
J	F	M	A	M	J	J	A	S	O	N	D
2 33 18	1.9 38 22	2.8 49 31	3.4 62 41	3.8 72 50	4.3 81 60	4.3 84 63	4.1 82 62	2.9 76 54	2.5 65 43	3.4 50 34	2.7 38 23
- █ Average max. and min. temperatures in °F
- █ Precipitation totals in inches
- Source: The Weather Channel
Metric conversion
J	F	M	A	M	J	J	A	S	O	N	D
50 1 −8	49 3 −6	71 9 −1	86 17 5	97 22 10	110 27 16	109 29 17	103 28 17	73 24 12	63 18 6	86 10 1	69 3 −5
- █ Average max. and min. temperatures in °C
- █ Precipitation totals in mm

Blackford County has a typical Midwestern humid continental seasonal climate, and its Köppen climate classification is Dfa. There are four distinct seasons, with winters being cold with moderate snowfall, while summers can be warm and humid. In recent years, average temperatures in county seat Hartford City have ranged from a low of 18 °F (−8 °C) in January to a high of 84 °F (29 °C) in July, although a record low of −26 °F (−32 °C) was recorded in January 1994 and a record high of 103 °F (39 °C) was recorded in June 1988. Average monthly precipitation ranged from 1.94 inches (49 mm) in February to 4.33 inches (110 mm) in June.

March and April are considered tornado season in Indiana. Blackford County endured an F4 storm on Palm Sunday (April 11) in 1965. This storm was one of many tornadoes that occurred in the Midwest on that day. F4 tornadoes have maximum speeds of 207 to 260 miles per hour (333 to 418 km/h), and this one crossed Blackford County farmland east of Roll. Although there were no fatalities in Blackford County from this tornado, two people were killed in neighboring Wells County. The county has recorded at least five other tornadoes. The most recent tornadoes occurred in Hartford City in 2002. However, those Hartford City tornadoes were rated F1 on the Fujita scale—much less dangerous than an F4 tornado.

Blackford County has a record for hail. Hailstones 4.5 inches (110 mm) in diameter fell in Hartford City on April 9, 2001. In a tie with the city of Cayuga, those hailstones are the largest ever recorded in the state of Indiana.

The biggest recorded snowstorm was the Great Blizzard of 1978, which occurred on January 26–27, 1978. A federal state of emergency was declared for Indiana at that time. Indiana governor Otis R. Bowen authorized the use of National Guard equipment, facilities, and personnel throughout the state. Low temperatures, high winds, and deep snow caused Hartford City to appear vacant, as schools and businesses closed. Wind gusts to 45 miles per hour (72 km/h) caused snowdrifts 5 feet (1.5 m) high, making travel almost impossible. Snowmobiles were the only viable means of transportation, and volunteers from Hartford City's Snowmobile Club provided emergency assistance.

== Economy ==
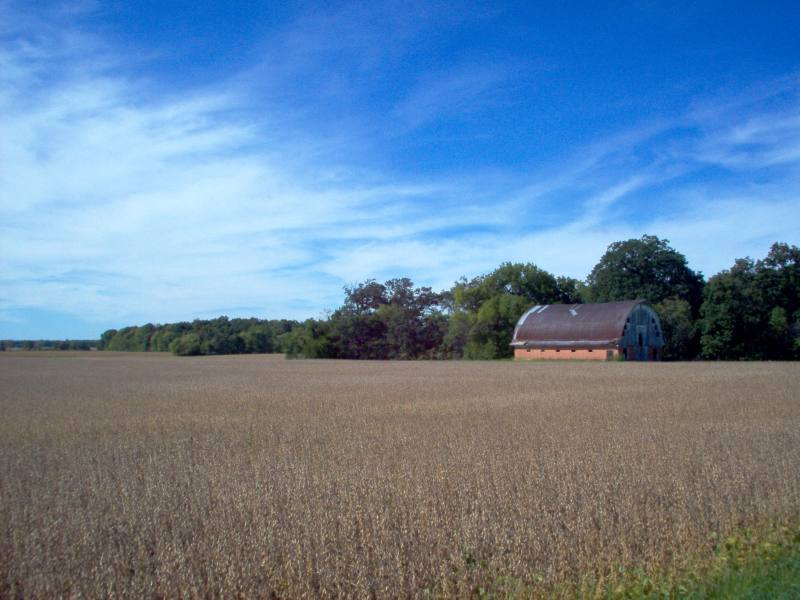
Autumn Soybean fields awaiting harvest in Blackford County

Blackford County's economy is supported by a labor force of approximately 5,900 workers with an unemployment rate for June 2013 of 9.8 percent. There are industrial parks in Montpelier and Hartford City, and both cities are served by railroad line owned by Norfolk Southern. Over 30 employers of varying size are located in the county. The Blackford County School System has the most employees, with locations in both Hartford City and Montpelier. 3M Company is currently the largest manufacturer in the county, and has been located in Hartford City since its purchase of the Hartford City Paper Mill in 1955. Another business employing more than 100 people is Blackford County Community Hospital, located in Hartford City. Emhart Gripco is Montpelier's leading employer, with over 100 employees.

Four categories account for over half the county's employment: manufacturing, government, retail trade, and health care. The largest category is manufacturing, with about 19 percent of the county's workforce. In addition to local Blackford County businesses, larger local economies in the more populous counties to the south and west offer employment and commerce, particularly in the city of Muncie in Delaware County, and the city of Marion in Grant County. Both counties employ more workers than their local workforce can provide. Agriculture has a significant impact on the county, although farm workers account for only about 5 percent of the county's workers. In 2007, the county had 250 farms occupying 84,626 acres (34,247 ha), so four-fifths of Blackford County is farmland. Nearly 72,000 acres (29,000 ha) are devoted to soybeans and corn. Wheat, hay, and oats are also grown. Livestock include over 24,000 hogs and pigs.

== Transportation ==
Map of Blackford County

There are no interstate highways in Blackford County, although Interstate 69 passes near the county's western border.

State Road 3 enters the county from Delaware County on the south. It runs north through Hartford City and enters Wells County near Roll. State Road 18 runs west–east through the north end of the county, on its way from Marion to the Ohio border; it passes through Montpelier and Matamoras.

State Road 26 also runs from west to east, entering from Upland in Grant County and crossing Hartford City at State Road 3. It continues through Trenton to Jay County.

State Road 167 runs along the eastern border of the county for about 5 miles (8.0 km) as it goes north from Dunkirk; it terminates when it reaches State Road 26.

A Norfolk Southern Railway railroad line enters the county from the south after leaving Eaton; it runs about a mile to the east of State Road 3 until it reaches Hartford City where it veers to the northeast and passes through Montpelier. It continues into Wells County to the north. Norfolk Southern also owns Blackford County's east–west line in southern Blackford county. An 8-mile (13 km) section of this line, between Converse and Hartford City, was abandoned during the last decade, and track has been removed. The line is still in service north of State Road 26, between Hartford City and Upland in Grant County. In October 2009, Central Railroad Company of Indianapolis pursued a leasing agreement to operate the east–west line with Norfolk Southern Railway in Blackford County. However, the line currently does not appear on the Central Railroad Company of Indianapolis system map.

== Education and health care ==
The county's five public schools are administered by the Blackford County School Corporation. During the 2010–11 school year, a total of 1,943 students attended these schools. The county school system was reorganized in 1963, after a county-wide vote favored a single school system for the entire county. As a result, Hartford City and Montpelier High Schools graduated their last classes in 1969, and a new high school serving the entire county was constructed in time for the 1969–1970 school year. Like the county, the new high school was named after Isaac Newton Blackford, and is called Blackford High School. The school is located a few miles north of Hartford City, near the center of the county. The school was designed for 1,200 students, and initial enrollment totaled to 1,150 students, serving grades 9 through 12. Current high school enrollment is less than 650. All students in grades 7 and 8 attend Blackford Junior High School. Although the county was served by eight elementary schools during the 1980s, consolidations have decreased the number of elementary schools to three. Montpelier Elementary School serves kindergarten through grade 6. In Hartford City, Southside Elementary School serves kindergarten through grade 3; students in grades 4–6 attend Northside Elementary School.

Four universities are near to Blackford County:

- Ball State University (Muncie)
- Ivy Tech State College-East Central (Muncie)
- Indiana Wesleyan University (a private school in Marion)
- Taylor University (a private school in Upland)

Montpelier and Hartford City both have public libraries. The Public Library of Montpelier and Harrison Township was built in 1907 and 1908. The building is known as the Montpelier Carnegie Library because it was made possible by a grant from philanthropist (and former business magnate) Andrew Carnegie. The library was added to the National Register of Historic Places in 2007. Hartford City's Public library, built in 1903, was also funded by a grant from Carnegie. The Carnegie Fund required local towns to do fundraising to match the grants, and to commit to operating the libraries after their construction. In many localities, women's groups were instrumental in organizing and doing fundraising for the libraries, both at the time of construction and since. Another library located in Hartford City belongs to the Blackford County Historical Society, and a museum is housed in the same building.

The Blackford County Health Department is located in Hartford City. The county's hospital is Indiana University Health Blackford Hospital, a 15-bed facility in Hartford City. It opened January 2005.

== Media ==
The first newspaper in Blackford County was The Hartford City Times, started by Dr. John Moler in 1852. Moler ran a drug store and print shop, and the Times was mostly an advertiser. At least one source considers The Blackford County News, which was started later in 1852, as the county's first newspaper—possibly because the Times was mostly for advertising. The Montpelier Examiner was first published in 1879, and that newspaper is the predecessor of The Montpelier Herald. The county's first daily newspaper, the Evening News, was started in 1894 by Edward Everett Cox in Hartford City. It was later renamed Hartford City News. After Cox's death in the 1930s, his family sold the Hartford City News to the owners of Hartford City's Times-Gazette, and the combined entity became the Hartford City News-Times. It continued through the years under several owners. In the twenty-first century, the newspaper titled itself News-Times, and calls itself "Blackford County’s only daily newspaper".

The two major television markets that reach Blackford County are Indianapolis and Fort Wayne. Although a few lower-powered stations are located closer to Blackford County in cities such as Muncie, Marion, and Kokomo, these stations typically do not have a broadcast range that covers all of Blackford County. There are no AM radio stations based in Blackford County, although several adjacent AM signals are available, including from Indianapolis, Fort Wayne, Muncie, and Marion. Several adjacent FM radio signals are also available; there are also FM stations in Hartford City and Montpelier. Hartford City, Montpelier, and portions of the county's rural areas have internet access available.

== Notable people ==
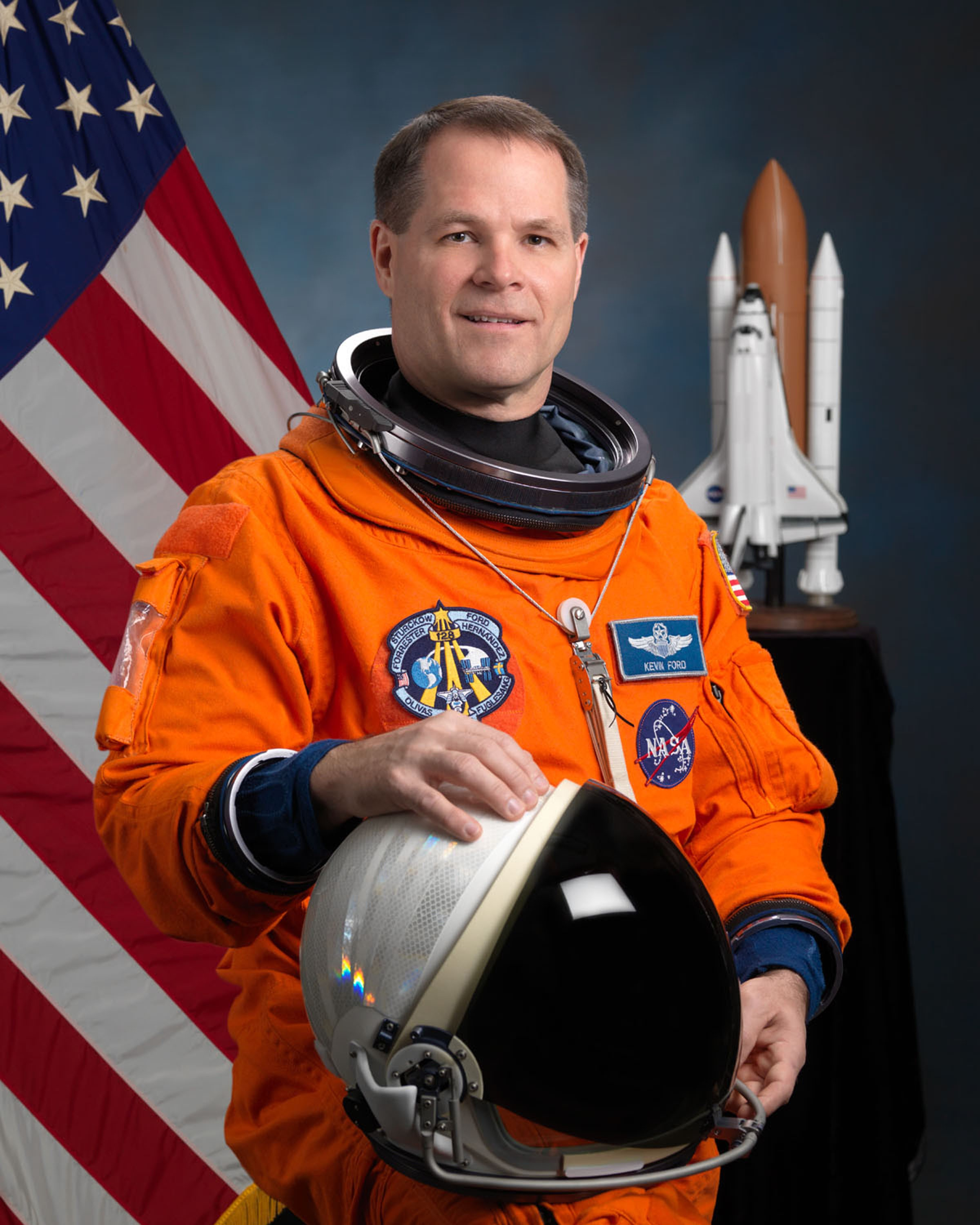
Astronaut Kevin A. Ford (Left)

Astronaut Kevin A. Ford lived in Montpelier, Indiana, for several years and graduated from Blackford High School in 1978. He was born in Portland, Indiana, in 1960. Holding four academic degrees, Ford retired from active duty as a colonel in the United States Air Force in 2008. He was the pilot for the Space Shuttle Discovery during its August 2009 flight, and has logged over 332 hours in outer space. On October 23, 2012, Ford returned to the International Space Station aboard a Russian spacecraft.

Radio DJ Larry Monroe was born in Hartford City, Indiana, on August 29, 1942. He graduated from Hartford City High School in 1960. From 1981 until his death in 2014 he was one of the most popular radio personalities in Austin, Texas. His shows are rebroadcast every Monday evening on KDRP-LP.

Clarence G. Johnson, who lived in Hartford City from 1923 until he died in 1935, was the first president of Overhead Door Corporation. He was a pioneer in the development of garage doors, and holds numerous patents. (Note: Examples of Johnson's patents are United States Patent No. 1,784,292, United States Patent No. 1,824,212, and United States Patent No. 2,026,091.) One of Johnson's more notable inventions is the first "electric operator for sectional upward-acting doors". Johnson's Overhead Door Corporation was a major employer in Blackford County for over 60 years, employing as many as 515 people during its peak years.

Former Indiana governor Maurice Clifford Townsend was born August 11, 1884, in Blackford County's Licking Township. After graduating from college in Marion, Indiana, Townsend served as superintendent of Blackford County schools, superintendent of Grant County schools, and as a representative of the Blackford-Grant District in the Indiana General Assembly. He was elected as Indiana's lieutenant governor in 1932. He won the 1936 election for governor, and served the single four-year term allowed by law. After his service in his home state, Townsend worked in the federal administration of President Franklin D. Roosevelt, in agriculture–related assignments. One memorable achievement: he directed school buses be painted yellow for safety and identification purposes, an idea that spread nationwide.

Golfer Erika Wicoff, a native of Hartford City, is one of the most decorated female athletes in Indiana University history, earning three Big Ten Player of the Year awards. She was the Big Ten women's golf champion in 1994, 1995 and 1996. She later competed in the Ladies Professional Golf Association. Wicoff was inducted into the Indiana Athletics Hall of Fame in 2006.

== See also ==
- National Register of Historic Places listings in Blackford County, Indiana

== Notes and references ==
=== Cited works ===
- Beetem, Debra (1980). "National Register of Historic Places Nomination: Blackford County Courthouse" (PDF). National Register of Historic Places. National Park Service. Archived from the original (PDF) on October 14, 2012.
- Beeson, Cecil E. Blackford County History. Blackford County Historical Society. OCLC 247154715.
- Beeson, Cecil E.; Bonham, John A. (1974). '76 and Blackford County IN. Fort Wayne, Indiana: Fort Wayne Public Library. OCLC 3402347.
- Blackford County Historical Society (Ind.). Ghost Towns in Blackford County, Indiana. Blackford County Historical Society.
- Blackford County Historical Society (Ind.) (1986). A History of Blackford County, Indiana : with historical accounts of the county, 1838–1986 [and] histories of families who have lived in the county. Hartford City, Indiana: Blackford County Historical Society. OCLC 15144953.
- Blatchley, W. S. (1896). "Twentieth Annual Report - 1895". Indiana Department of Geology and Natural Resources Annual Report. 20. Indiana Department of Geology and Natural Resources. OCLC 7536715.
- Blatchley, W. S. (1897). "Twenty-First Annual Report - 1896". Indiana Department of Geology and Natural Resources Annual Report. 21. Indiana Department of Geology and Natural Resources. OCLC 7536715.
- Dale, George R. (1902). Directory of Hartford City, Indiana, Together with a Complete Gazetteer of Blackford County Land Owners. Troy, Ohio: George R. Dale. ISBN 978-1-153-46853-4.
- Forstall, Richard L., ed. (1996). Population of states and counties of the United States: 1790 to 1990 from the twenty-one decennial censuses. United States Department of Commerce, Bureau of the Census, Population Division. ISBN 0-934213-48-8. OCLC 34927951.
- Garrigus, Andrew (1990). Engineering Soils Map of Blackford County, Indiana. West Lafayette, Indiana: Joint Highway Research Project, Indiana Department of Transportation and Purdue University. OCLC 23770990.
- Glass, James A.; Kohrman, David (2005). The Gas Boom of East Central Indiana. Image of America. Charleston SC: Arcadia. ISBN 978-0-7385-3963-8. OCLC 61885891.
- Goltra, W. F. (1895). Characteristics of the Lake Erie & Western Railroad System. Indianapolis: Press of Levey Bros. & Co. OCLC 7147894.
- Grant, Tina (2005). International directory of company histories, Vol. 70. Chicago: St. James Press. ISBN 978-1-55862-545-7. OCLC 224417874.
- Hamilton, Kristi; Abraham, Kent; Lankford, Susan (2005). "National Register of Historic Places Nomination: Hartford City Courthouse Square District" (PDF). National Register of Historic Places. National Park Service. Archived from the original (PDF) on October 10, 2012.
- Hammel, Bob; Klingelhoffer, Kit (1999). The Glory of Old IU: Indiana University. Champaign, Illinois: Sports Pub. ISBN 978-1-58261-068-9. OCLC 42939082.
- Historic Landmarks Foundation of Indiana (2005). Blackford County: Interim Report, Indiana Historic Sites and Structures Inventory. Historic Landmarks Foundation of Indiana. ISBN 978-1-889235-20-2. OCLC 62513317.
- Indiana General Assembly (1839). "Laws of the state of Indiana, passed at the ... session of the General Assembly". Laws of the State of Indiana. 23rd session. Indianapolis: J.P. Chapman. OCLC 8733001.
- Indiana State Board of Health (1907). "Twenty-Sixth Annual Report of the State Board of Health of Indiana". Annual Report of the State Board of Health of Indiana. 26. Indianapolis: Indiana State Board of Health. OCLC 7567509.
- Indiana State House of Representatives (1836). "Journal of the House of Representatives of the State of Indiana during the Twenty-First Session of the General Assembly". Laws of the State of Indiana. Indianapolis: M. M. Henkle.
- Indiana State House of Representatives (1837). "Journal of the House of Representatives of the State of Indiana during the Twenty-Second Session of the General Assembly". Laws of the State of Indiana. Indianapolis: Bolton and Livingston. OCLC 561680396.
- Kane, Joseph Nathan; Aiken, Charles Curry (2005). The American counties : origins of county names, dates of creation and population data, 1950–2000. Lanham MD: Scarecrow Press. p. 413. ISBN 978-0-8108-5036-1. OCLC 260010945. "Blackford."
- Leonard, Craig; Walker, Amy (2005). "National Register of Historic Places Nomination: Montpelier Carnegie Library" (PDF). National Register of Historic Places. National Park Service. Archived from the original (PDF) on October 14, 2012.
- McAbee, Daniel (1902). "Fifth Annual Report of the Department of Inspection - 1901". Annual Report of the Department of Inspection of Manufacturing and Mercantile Establishments, Laundries, Bakeries, Quarries, Printing Offices and Public Buildings. 5. State of Indiana. OCLC 13018369.
- McIlwraith, Thomas F.; Muller, Edward K. (2001). North America: the Historical Geography of a Changing Continent. Lanham MD: Rowman & Littlefield Publishers. ISBN 978-0-7425-0018-1. OCLC 248646178.
- Monks, Leander John; Esarey, Logan; Shockley, Ernest V. (1916). Courts and Lawyers of Indiana. Indianapolis: Federal Publishing Co. p. 564. OCLC 4158945. "Blackford was cut off from Jay county."
- Montgomery, M. W.; Jay, Milton T. (1922). History of Jay County, Indiana : including its World War record and incorporating the Montgomery history. Indianapolis: Historical Publishing Co. OCLC 5976187.
- Shinn, Benjamin Granville (1900). Biographical memoirs of Blackford County, Ind: to which is appended a comprehensive compendium of national biography ... embellished with portraits of many well known residents of Blackford County, Indiana. Chicago: The Bowen Publishing Co. OCLC 3554406.
- Shinn, Benjamin Granville (1914). Blackford and Grant Counties, Indiana: A Chronicle of Their People Past and Present with Family Lineage and Personal Memoirs: Vol. I. Chicago & New York: The Lewis Publishing Co. ISBN 978-1-178-13953-2.
- Shockley, E. V. (1914). "County Seats and County Seat Wars of Indiana". Indiana Magazine of History. X (1). Bloomington IN: Indiana University Department of History. OCLC 2371402.
- Unlisted (Biographical and historical record...) (1887). Biographical and historical record of Jay and Blackford Counties, Indiana: Containing ... portraits and biographies of some of the prominent men of the state : engravings of prominent citizens in Jay and Blackford Counties, with personal histories of many of the leading families and a concise history of Jay and Blackford Counties and their cities and villages. Chicago: The Lewis Publishing Co. OCLC 15560416.
