= Dunkirk, Indiana =

- City
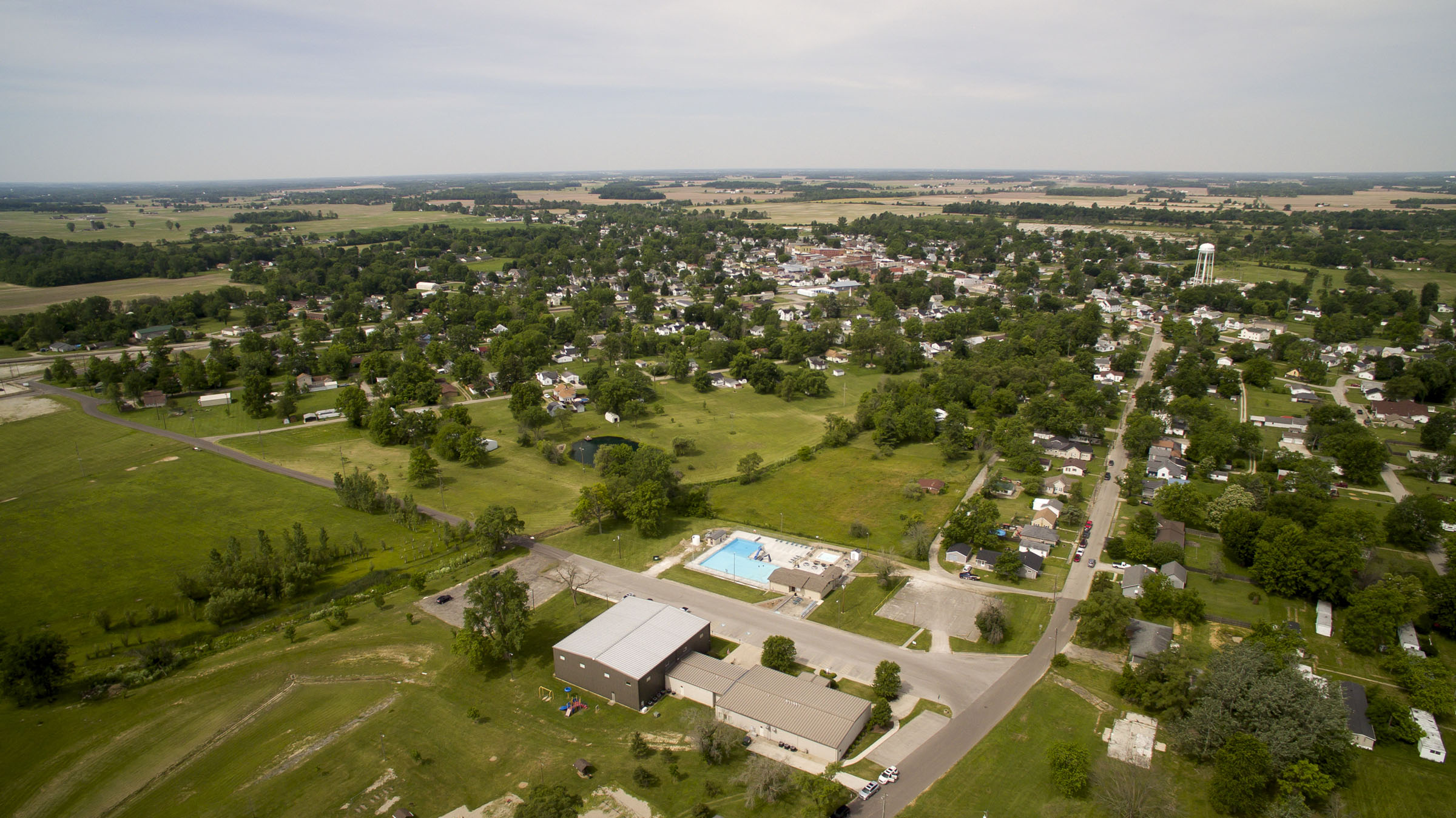
- Aerial view of Dunkirk, Indiana
- Nickname: Glass capitol of Indiana
- Location of Dunkirk in Blackford County and Jay County, Indiana.
- Coordinates: 40°22′34″N 85°12′24″W
- Country: United States
- State: Indiana
- Counties: Jay, Blackford
- Townships: Richland, Jackson

Government
  - Mayor: Jack Robbins (D)

Area
  - Total: 1.19 sq mi (3.07 km^{2})
  - Land: 1.17 sq mi (3.04 km^{2})
  - Water: 0.012 sq mi (0.03 km^{2})
- Elevation: 951 ft (290 m)

Population (2020)
  - Total: 2,164
  - Estimate (2025): 2,068 ▼
  - Density: 1,841.8/sq mi (711.12/km^{2})
- Time zone: UTC-5 (EST)
  - Summer (DST): UTC-4 (EDT)
- ZIP code: 47336
- Area code: 765
- FIPS code: 18-19054
- GNIS feature ID: 2394576
- Website: dunkirkin.gov

Dunkirk is a city in Blackford and Jay counties in the U.S. state of Indiana. The population was 2,164 at the 2020 census.

== History ==
Dunkirk was originally called Quincy, and under the latter name was platted in 1853. When the first post office was established there, it was discovered there was already a Quincy, Indiana, and so the town was renamed Dunkirk to avoid repetition.

The Dunkirk Post Office contains a mural, Preparations for Autumn Festival, Dunkirk, painted in 1941 by Frances Foy. Murals were produced from 1934 to 1943 in the United States through the Section of Painting and Sculpture, later called the Section of Fine Arts, of the Treasury Department.

Dunkirk, referred as the Glass Capitol of Indiana, was once home to 23 glass factories, some no larger than a house. With the closure of Indiana Glass Company, only one glass factory remains. It produces approximately 2,500,000 beer bottles per day for Budweiser. The factory is an ultra-computerized modern facility employing 400 employees. Dunkirk also houses an extensive Glass Museum with glass manufactured worldwide. An annual Feel The Warmth downtown city event and a Mainstreet USA Festival. It also has a large 4 July Fireworks Display and Annual Event held at the large City Park.

Dunkirk is also home to one of the largest city parks in Jay County as well as a downtown Depot Park with Summer Concerts and Weekend Farmer Markets. The large Municipal provides 2 baseball fields, 1 large enclosed shelter house and a small open shelter building, various children related playground equipment, a basketball court, a large modern community center and a community swimming pool.

== Geography ==
Dunkirk is primarily in Jay County, though the northwestern portion of the town (west of Main Street and north of Blackford Avenue) lies in neighboring Blackford County. The southwestern portion of town also abuts Delaware County.

According to the 2010 census, Dunkirk has a total area of 1.26 square miles (3.26 km^{2}), all land.

=== Climate ===
Dunkirk has a typical Midwestern humid continental seasonal climate. There are four distinct seasons, with winters being cold with moderate snowfall, while summers can be warm and humid. The highest average temperature is in July at 84 °F (29 °C), while the lowest average temperature is in January at 15 °F (−9.0 °C). However, summer temperatures can top 90 °F (32 °C), and winter temperatures can drop below 0 °F (−17 °C). Average monthly precipitation ranges from about 2 to 4 inches (5 to 10 cm), with the heaviest occurring during May, June, and July. The highest recorded temperature was 110.0 °F (43.3 °C) on July 14, 1936, and the lowest recorded temperature was −40.0 °F (−31.7 °C) on January 21, 1985.

Climate data for Dunkirk, Indiana
Month	Jan	Feb	Mar	Apr	May	Jun	Jul	Aug	Sep	Oct	Nov	Dec	Year
Mean daily maximum °F (°C)	32 (0)	37 (3)	48 (9)	60 (16)	71 (22)	80 (27)	84 (29)	82 (28)	76 (24)	64 (18)	50 (10)	38 (3)	60 (16)
Mean daily minimum °F (°C)	15 (−9)	18 (−8)	28 (−2)	38 (3)	49 (9)	58 (14)	62 (17)	59 (15)	50 (10)	39 (4)	31 (−1)	21 (−6)	39 (4)
Average precipitation inches (mm)	1.89 (48)	1.84 (47)	2.69 (68)	3.50 (89)	4.06 (103)	4.42 (112)	4.40 (112)	3.65 (93)	3.02 (77)	2.62 (67)	3.23 (82)	2.58 (66)	37.9 (964)
Source: The Weather Channel

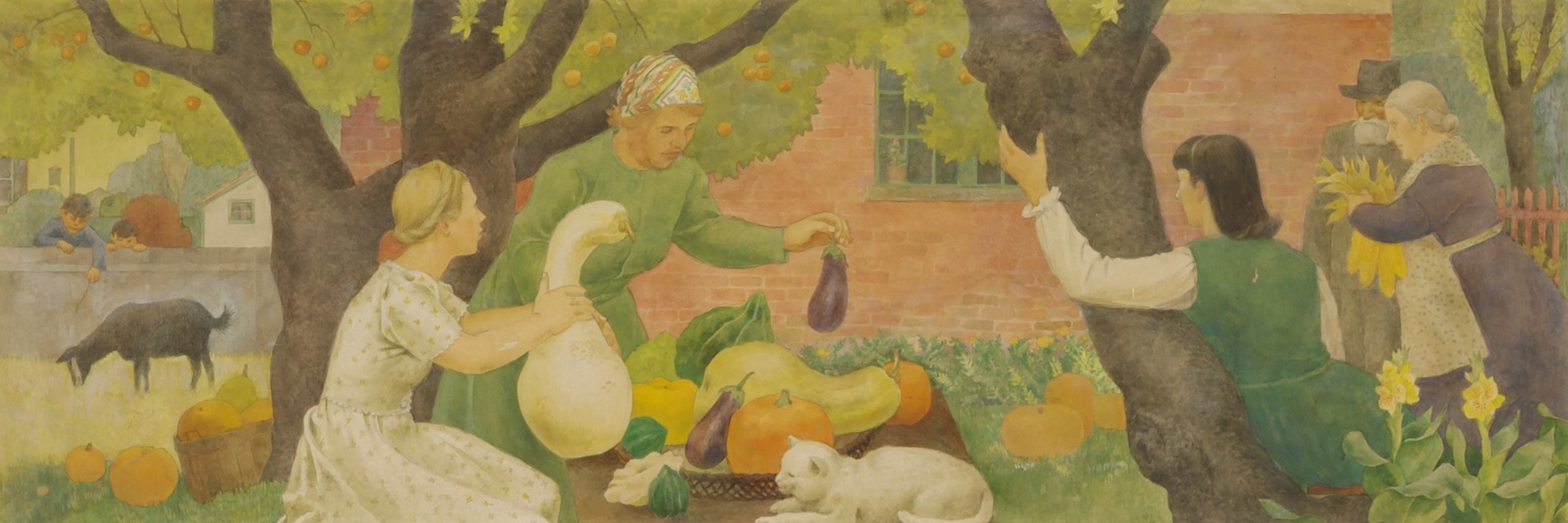
Preparations for Autumn Festival, Dunkirk (1941), study by Frances Foy for the Dunkirk post office mural

== Demographics ==
Historical population
Census	Pop.	Note	%±
1880	662		—
1890	1,024		54.7%
1900	3,187		211.2%
1910	3,031		−4.9%
1920	2,532		−16.5%
1930	2,583		2.0%
1940	2,942		13.9%
1950	3,048		3.6%
1960	3,117		2.3%
1970	3,465		11.2%
1980	3,180		−8.2%
1990	2,739		−13.9%
2000	2,646		−3.4%
2010	2,362		−10.7%
2020	2,164		−8.4%
2025 (est.)	2,068		−4.4%
U.S. Decennial Census

=== 2020 census ===
As of the 2020 census, Dunkirk had a population of 2,164. The median age was 40.8 years. 23.0% of residents were under the age of 18 and 18.8% of residents were 65 years of age or older. For every 100 females there were 99.3 males, and for every 100 females age 18 and over there were 97.9 males age 18 and over.

0.0% of residents lived in urban areas, while 100.0% lived in rural areas.

There were 892 households in Dunkirk, of which 28.9% had children under the age of 18 living in them. Of all households, 40.0% were married-couple households, 22.1% were households with a male householder and no spouse or partner present, and 28.6% were households with a female householder and no spouse or partner present. About 31.4% of all households were made up of individuals and 14.4% had someone living alone who was 65 years of age or older.

There were 1,083 housing units, of which 17.6% were vacant. The homeowner vacancy rate was 5.3% and the rental vacancy rate was 16.0%.

Racial composition as of the 2020 census
Race	Number	Percent
White	2,048	94.6%
Black or African American	11	0.5%
American Indian and Alaska Native	3	0.1%
Asian	2	0.1%
Native Hawaiian and Other Pacific Islander	0	0.0%
Some other race	0	0.0%
Two or more races	100	4.6%
Hispanic or Latino (of any race)	39	1.8%

=== 2010 census ===
As of the census of 2010, there were 2,362 people, 960 households, and 619 families living in the city. The population density was 1,874.6 inhabitants per square mile (723.8/km^{2}). There were 1,171 housing units at an average density of 929.4 per square mile (358.8/km^{2}). The racial makeup of the city was 98.6% White, 0.3% African American, 0.1% Native American, 0.4% from other races, and 0.6% from two or more races. Hispanic or Latino of any race were 1.2% of the population.

There were 960 households, of which 32.0% had children under the age of 18 living with them, 42.6% were married couples living together, 15.4% had a female householder with no husband present, 6.5% had a male householder with no wife present, and 35.5% were non-families. 31.1% of all households were made up of individuals, and 12.4% had someone living alone who was 65 years of age or older. The average household size was 2.46 and the average family size was 3.03.

The median age in the city was 37.2 years. 26.3% of residents were under the age of 18; 8.9% were between the ages of 18 and 24; 24.9% were from 25 to 44; 25.6% were from 45 to 64; and 14.2% were 65 years of age or older. The gender makeup of the city was 48.6% male and 51.4% female.

=== 2000 census ===
As of the census of 2000, there were 2,646 people, 1,093 households, and 746 families living in the city. The population density was 2,351.4 inhabitants per square mile (907.9/km^{2}). There were 1,214 housing units at an average density of 1,078.8 per square mile (416.5/km^{2}). The racial makeup of the city was 98.34% White, 0.30% African American, 0.15% Native American, 0.26% Asian, 0.08% Pacific Islander, 0.11% from other races, and 0.76% from two or more races. Hispanic or Latino of any race were 0.64% of the population.

There were 1,093 households, out of which 30.9% had children under the age of 18 living with them, 51.9% were married couples living together, 12.3% had a female householder with no husband present, and 31.7% were non-families. 27.5% of all households were made up of individuals, and 15.3% had someone living alone who was 65 years of age or older. The average household size was 2.42 and the average family size was 2.91.

In the city the population was spread out, with 24.6% under the age of 18, 9.2% from 18 to 24, 26.6% from 25 to 44, 23.7% from 45 to 64, and 15.9% who were 65 years of age or older. The median age was 38 years. For every 100 females, there were 92.0 males. For every 100 females age 18 and over, there were 85.3 males.

The median income for a household in the city was $33,750, and the median income for a family was $38,220. Males had a median income of $32,684 versus $20,517 for females. The per capita income for the city was $15,128. About 7.1% of families and 10.5% of the population were below the poverty line, including 10.7% of those under age 18 and 9.8% of those age 65 or over.

== Education ==
The town has a lending library, the Dunkirk Public Library. The town also has an Elementary School, Westlawn Elementary and a Middle school, West Jay Middle School (stated to be closed in 2020 and middle school students sent to the High School, and the elementary students sent to the Middle School). They are both located in the city limits and are a part of Jay County School Corporation.
